= Politics of Apulia =

Regional Italian politics

The politics of Apulia, a region of Italy, takes place in the framework of an "anomalous presidential" representative democracy or prime-ministerial system with an executive presidency, whereby the President of the Region is the head of government, and of a pluriform multi-party system. Legislative power is vested in the Regional Council of Apulia, while executive power is exercised by the Regional Government led by the President, who is directly elected by the people. The current Statute, which regulates the functioning of the regional institutions, has been in force since 2004.

Prior to the rise of Fascism, most of the deputies elected in Apulia were part of the liberal establishment (see Historical Right, Historical Left and Liberals), which governed Italy for decades. At the 1924 general election, which opened the way to the Fascist authoritarian rule, Apulia was one of the regions where the National Fascist Party (PNF) obtained more than 50% of the vote.

After World War II, Apulia became a stronghold of the Christian Democracy (DC), which was especially strong in rural areas. The region is now considered a stronghold of the "centre-left coalition" led by the Democratic Party (PD), having been governed by such alliance since 2005.

Between 2005 and 2015 the region was headed by Nichi Vendola, the first openly LGBTQ head of a regional government in Italy.

== Executive branch ==
Palazzo del Provveditorato in Bari is the seat of the Regional Government.

The Regional Government (Giunta Regionale) is presided by the President of the Region (Presidente della Regione), who is elected for a five-year term, and is currently composed by 10 members: the President and 9 regional ministers or assessors (Assessori), including a Vice President (Vice Presidente).

The current President is Antonio Decaro (PD), who took office on 7 January 2026.

=== Current composition ===
The current Regional Government was sworn in on 16 January 2026.

Party		Members
Democratic Party	PD	President and 4 ministers
Five Star Movement	M5S	1 minister
Greens and Left Alliance	AVS	1 minister
Independent	Ind	3 ministers

Minister	Party	Delegate for
Cristian Casili (vice president)	M5S	Welfare, social and youth policies and sport
Debora Ciliento	PD	Environment and climate change
Francesco Paolicelli	PD	Agriculture
Donato Pentassuglia	PD	Healthcare
Raffaele Piemontese	PD	Infrastructures and sustainable mobility
Eugenio Di Sciascio	Ind	Economic development and labour policies
Sebastiano Leo	Ind	Budget and finances
Silvia Miglietta	Ind	Culture
Marina Leuzzi	AVS	Urban development and public housing

=== List of presidents ===
The current President of Apulia is Michele Emiliano, who is serving his second term after winning the 2020 regional election.

Presidents elected by the Regional Council (1970–1995)

N.	Name	Term of office		Political party	Legislature
1	Gennaro Trisorio Liuzzi	8 June 1970	16 June 1975	DC	I (1970)
2	Nicola Rotolo	16 June 1975	23 December 1978	DC	II (1975)
3	Nicola Quarta	23 December 1978	9 June 1980	DC	II (1975)
3	Nicola Quarta	9 June 1980	4 July 1983	DC	III (1980)
–	Angelo Monfredi (acting)	4 July 1983	23 September 1983	DC	III (1980)
(1)	Gennaro Trisorio Liuzzi	23 September 1983	13 May 1985	DC	III (1980)
4	Salvatore Fitto	13 May 1985	29 August 1988	DC	IV (1985)
–	Franco Borgia (acting)	29 August 1988	23 November 1988	PSI	IV (1985)
5	Giuseppe Colasanto	23 November 1988	6 May 1990	DC	IV (1985)
6	Michele Bellomo	6 May 1990	23 October 1992	DC	V (1990)
7	Cosimo Convertino	23 October 1992	4 December 1992	PSI	V (1990)
8	Giovanni Copertino	4 December 1992	3 September 1993	DC	V (1990)
9	Vito Savino	3 September 1993	1 March 1994	DC	V (1990)
10	Giuseppe Martellotta	1 March 1994	27 June 1995	PPI	V (1990)

Directly-elected presidents (since 1995)

N.	Portrait	President	Term of office		Tenure (Years and days)	Party	Composition	Legislature
11		Salvatore Distaso (1937–2008)	27 June 1995	19 May 2000	4 years, 327 days	FI	FI–AN–CDC	VI (1995)
12		Raffaele Fitto (b. 1969)	19 May 2000	27 April 2005	4 years, 343 days	FI	FI–AN–CDC–CDU	VII (2000)
13		Nichi Vendola (b. 1958)	27 April 2005	26 April 2010	10 years, 60 days	PRC / SEL	DS–DL–PRC–SDI– UDEUR–PdCI−IdV–FdV	VIII (2005)
13		Nichi Vendola (b. 1958)	26 April 2010	26 June 2015	10 years, 60 days	PRC / SEL	PD–SEL–IdV	IX (2010)
14		Michele Emiliano (b. 1959)	26 June 2015	24 November 2020	10 years, 195 days	PD	PD–SEL–IdV–SC–UdC	X (2015)
14		Michele Emiliano (b. 1959)	24 November 2020	7 January 2026	10 years, 195 days	PD	PD–CE–PcE–M5S	XI (2020)
15		Antonio Decaro (b. 1970)	7 January 2026	Incumbent	290 days	PD	PD–M5S	XII (2025)

== Legislative branch ==
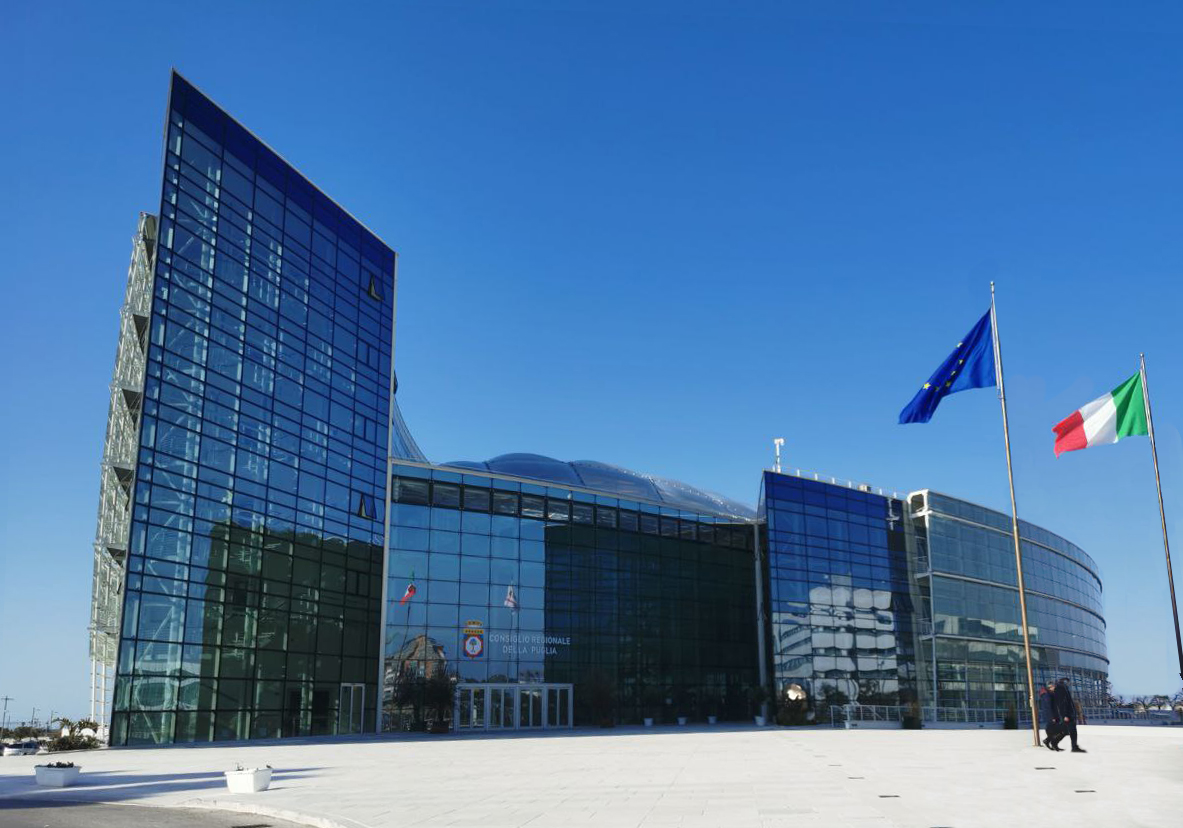
Palazzo della Regione in Bari is the seat of the Regional Council.

The Regional Council of Apulia (Consiglio Regionale della Puglia) is composed of 51 members, 50 councillors and the President. 23 councillors are elected in provincial constituencies by proportional representation using the largest remainder method with a Droop quota and open lists, while 27 councillors (elected in a general ticket) come from a "regional list", including the President-elect. One seat is reserved for the candidate who comes second.

The Council is elected for a five-year term, but, if the President suffers a vote of no confidence, resigns or dies, under the simul stabunt, simul cadent clause introduced in 1999 (literally they will stand together or they will fall together), also the Council is dissolved and a snap election is called.

=== Current composition ===
The Regional Council of Apulia is currently composed of the following political groups:

Party	Seats	Status
Democratic Party (PD)	15 / 51	In government
Brothers of Italy (FdI)	11 / 51	In opposition
Decaro for President	7 / 51	In government
Forza Italia (FI)	5 / 51	In opposition
For Apulia (PP)	4 / 51	In government
Five Star Movement (M5S)	4 / 51	In government
Lega	4 / 51	In opposition
Mixed group	1 / 51	In opposition

By coalition:

Party	Seats	Status
Centre-left coalition	30 / 51	Government
Centre-right coalition	21 / 51	Opposition

== Local government ==
=== Provinces ===
Provinces of Apulia

Apulia is divided into five provinces and one metropolitan city.

After the 2014 reform of local authorities the Province of Bari was replaced by the new Metropolitan City of Bari. Since 2014 the president of the province is no more elected directly by citizens, but is chosen by mayors and councilors of the municipalities of the province.

Province / Metropolitan City	Inhabitants	President	Party	Election
Metropolitan City of Bari	1,261,954	Vito Leccese (metropolitan mayor)	PD	2024
Barletta-Andria-Trani	384,293	Bernardo Lodispoto	PD	2023
Brindisi	401,652	Elio Ciccarese	PD	2026
Foggia	627,102	Giuseppe Nobiletti	PD	2023
Lecce	802,807	Fabio Tarantino	Ind.	2026
Taranto	581,092	Gianfranco Palmisano	PD	2025

=== Municipalities ===
Apulia is also divided into 258 comuni (municipalities), which have even more history, having been established in the Middle Ages when they were the main places of government. There are eight provincial capital cities in Apulia, as the Province of Barletta-Andria-Trani is the only province in Italy with three capital cities.

There are 258 communes in Apulia (as of January 2019):

- 41 in the Metropolitan City of Bari
- 10 in the Province of Barletta-Andria-Trani
- 20 in the Province of Brindisi
- 61 in the Province of Foggia
- 97 in the Province of Lecce
- 29 in the Province of Taranto

Provincial capitals

Municipality	Inhabitants	Mayor	Party	Election
Andria	100,357	Giovanna Bruno	PD	2026
Bari	311,997	Vito Leccese	PD	2024
Barletta	94,664	Cosimo Cannito	Ind.	2022
Brindisi	88,482	Giuseppe Marchionna	Ind.	2023
Foggia	152,700	Maria Aida Episcopo	Ind.	2023
Lecce	89,902	Adriana Poli Bortone	Ind.	2024
Taranto	198,083	Piero Bitetti	PD	2025
Trani	55,808	Marco Galiano	PD	2026

Other municipalities

Cities with more than 50,000 inhabitants.

Municipality	Inhabitants	Mayor	Party	Election
Altamura	70,789	Vitantonio Petronella	Ind.	2023
Molfetta	60,272	Tommaso Minervini	PD	2022
Cerignola	57,007	Francesco Bonito	PD	2021
Manfredonia	56,318	Domenico La Marca	Ind.	2024
Bitonto	56,304	Francesco Paolo Ricci	PD	2022
San Severo	55,297	vacant		
Bisceglie	54,847	Angelantonio Angarano	Ind.	2023

== Parties and elections ==
=== Latest regional election ===
In the latest regional election, which took place on 23–24 November 2025, Antonio Decaro of the Democratic Party was elected President by a landslide 64.0% of the vote.

23–24 November 2025 Apulian regional election results
Candidates	Votes	%	Seats	Parties	Votes	%	Seats
Antonio Decaro	919,753	63.98	1				
Antonio Decaro	919,753	63.98	1	Democratic Party	344,229	25.91	14
Antonio Decaro	919,753	63.98	1	Decaro for President	168,944	12.72	7
Antonio Decaro	919,753	63.98	1	For Apulia	113,515	8.54	4
Antonio Decaro	919,753	63.98	1	Five Star Movement	95,963	7.22	4
Antonio Decaro	919,753	63.98	1	Greens and Left Alliance	54,358	4.09	0
Antonio Decaro	919,753	63.98	1	Forward Populars with Decaro	54,306	4.09	0
Antonio Decaro	919,753	63.98	1	Total	831.315	62.57	29
Luigi Lobuono	505,146	35.14	1				
Luigi Lobuono	505,146	35.14	1	Brothers of Italy	248,905	18.73	11
Luigi Lobuono	505,146	35.14	1	Forza Italia	121,014	9.11	5
Luigi Lobuono	505,146	35.14	1	League	106,852	8.04	4
Luigi Lobuono	505,146	35.14	1	Us Moderates	10,997	0.83	0
Luigi Lobuono	505,146	35.14	1	Apulia With Us	1,127	0.08	0
Luigi Lobuono	505,146	35.14	1	Total	488,895	36.80	20
Ada Donno	10,070	0.70	0	Pacifist and Popular Apulia	6,734	0.51	0
Sabino Mangano	2,642	0.18	0	Civic Alliance for Apulia	1,683	0.13	0
Blank and invalid votes	37,826	2.56					
Total candidates	1,437,611	100.0	2	Total parties	1,328,628	100.0	49
Registered voters/turnout	1,475,437	41.83					
Source: Apulia Region – Results
