= Elections in Apulia =

Italian regional elections

This page gathers the results of elections in Apulia.

== Regional elections ==
=== Latest regional election ===
In the latest regional election, which took place on 23–24 November 2025, Antonio Decaro of the Democratic Party was elected President by a landslide 64.0% of the vote.

23–24 November 2025 Apulian regional election results
Candidates	Votes	%	Seats	Parties	Votes	%	Seats
Antonio Decaro	919,665	63.97	1				
Antonio Decaro	919,665	63.97	1	Democratic Party	344,228	25.94	14
Antonio Decaro	919,665	63.97	1	Decaro for President	168,945	12.72	7
Antonio Decaro	919,665	63.97	1	For Apulia	113,515	8.54	4
Antonio Decaro	919,665	63.97	1	Five Star Movement	95,963	7.22	4
Antonio Decaro	919,665	63.97	1	Greens and Left Alliance	54,358	4.09	0
Antonio Decaro	919,665	63.97	1	Forward Populars with Decaro	54,306	4.09	0
Antonio Decaro	919,665	63.97	1	Total	831.315	62.57	29
Luigi Lobuono	505,055	35.13	1				
Luigi Lobuono	505,055	35.13	1	Brothers of Italy	248,904	18.73	11
Luigi Lobuono	505,055	35.13	1	Forza Italia	121,015	9.11	5
Luigi Lobuono	505,055	35.13	1	League	106,853	8.04	4
Luigi Lobuono	505,055	35.13	1	Us Moderates	10,997	0.83	0
Luigi Lobuono	505,055	35.13	1	Apulia With Us	1,127	0.08	0
Luigi Lobuono	505,055	35.13	1	Total	488,896	36.80	20
Ada Donno	10,070	0.70	0	Pacifist and Popular Apulia	6,734	0.51	0
Sabino Mangano	2,819	0.20	0	Civic Alliance for Apulia	1,683	0.13	0
Blank and invalid votes	37,828	2.56					
Total candidates	1,437,609	100.0	2	Total parties	1,328,628	100.0	49
Registered voters/turnout	1,475,437	41.83					
Source: Apulia Region – Results

=== List of previous regional elections ===
- 1970 Apulian regional election
- 1975 Apulian regional election
- 1980 Apulian regional election
- 1985 Apulian regional election
- 1990 Apulian regional election
- 1995 Apulian regional election
- 2000 Apulian regional election
- 2005 Apulian regional election
- 2010 Apulian regional election
- 2015 Apulian regional election
- 2020 Apulian regional election
