= List of presidents of Apulia =

This is the list of presidents of Apulia since 1970.

== List ==
Presidents elected by the Regional Council (1970–1995)

N.	Name	Term of office		Political party	Legislature
1	Gennaro Trisorio Liuzzi	8 June 1970	16 June 1975	DC	I (1970)
2	Nicola Rotolo	16 June 1975	23 December 1978	DC	II (1975)
3	Nicola Quarta	23 December 1978	9 June 1980	DC	II (1975)
3	Nicola Quarta	9 June 1980	4 July 1983	DC	III (1980)
–	Angelo Monfredi (acting)	4 July 1983	23 September 1983	DC	III (1980)
(1)	Gennaro Trisorio Liuzzi	23 September 1983	13 May 1985	DC	III (1980)
4	Salvatore Fitto	13 May 1985	29 August 1988	DC	IV (1985)
–	Franco Borgia (acting)	29 August 1988	23 November 1988	PSI	IV (1985)
5	Giuseppe Colasanto	23 November 1988	6 May 1990	DC	IV (1985)
6	Michele Bellomo	6 May 1990	23 October 1992	DC	V (1990)
7	Cosimo Convertino	23 October 1992	4 December 1992	PSI	V (1990)
8	Giovanni Copertino	4 December 1992	3 September 1993	DC	V (1990)
9	Vito Savino	3 September 1993	1 March 1994	DC	V (1990)
10	Giuseppe Martellotta	1 March 1994	27 June 1995	PPI	V (1990)

Directly-elected presidents (since 1995)

N.	Portrait	President	Term of office		Tenure (Years and days)	Party	Composition	Legislature
11		Salvatore Distaso (1937–2008)	27 June 1995	19 May 2000	4 years, 327 days	FI	FI–AN–CDC	VI (1995)
12		Raffaele Fitto (b. 1969)	19 May 2000	27 April 2005	4 years, 343 days	FI	FI–AN–CDC–CDU	VII (2000)
13		Nichi Vendola (b. 1958)	27 April 2005	26 April 2010	10 years, 60 days	PRC / SEL	DS–DL–PRC–SDI– UDEUR–PdCI−IdV–FdV	VIII (2005)
13		Nichi Vendola (b. 1958)	26 April 2010	26 June 2015	10 years, 60 days	PRC / SEL	PD–SEL–IdV	IX (2010)
14		Michele Emiliano (b. 1959)	26 June 2015	24 November 2020	10 years, 195 days	PD	PD–SEL–IdV–SC–UdC	X (2015)
14		Michele Emiliano (b. 1959)	24 November 2020	7 January 2026	10 years, 195 days	PD	PD–CE–PcE–M5S	XI (2020)
15		Antonio Decaro (b. 1970)	7 January 2026	Incumbent	248 days	PD	PD–M5S	XII (2025)
