= Regional Council of Apulia =

Legislative organ of Apulia, Italy

- 12th Legislature

Type
- Type: Regional council Unicameral
- Established: 20 July 1970

Leadership
- President: Toni Matarrelli, PD since 2 February 2026

Structure
- Seats: 51
- Political groups: Government (30): PD (15); Decaro List (7); PP (4); M5S (4); Opposition (21): FdI (11); FI (5); Lega (4); Mixed (1)
- Length of term: 5 years

Elections
- Voting system: Party-list semi-proportional representation with majority bonus D'Hondt method
- Last election: 23 November 2025

Meeting place
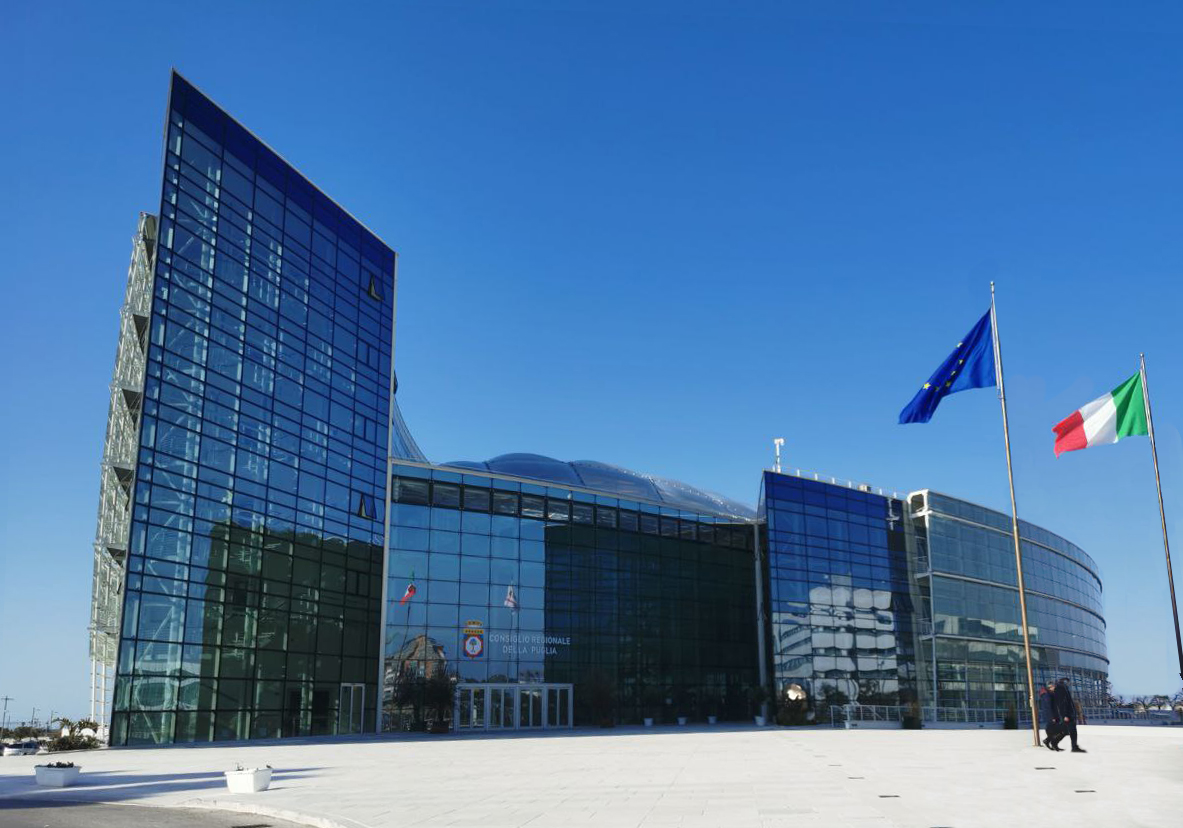
- Palazzo della Regione, Bari

Website
- Official website

The Regional Council of Apulia (Consiglio Regionale della Puglia) is the legislative assembly of Apulia.

It was first elected in 1970, when the ordinary regions were instituted, on the basis of the Constitution of Italy of 1948.

== Composition ==
The Regional Council of Apulia was originally composed of 50 regional councillors. The number of regional councillors increased to 63 in 1995, then reduced to 60 in 2000 and subsequently increased again to 70 in 2005, following a modification of the regional Statute in 2004. In the 2005 regional election the number of councillors further raised to 78, following a further allocation of 8 regional councillors to the center-left winning coalition.

Following the decree-law n. 138 of 13 August 2011 the number of regional councillors returned to 50, with an additional seat reserved for the President of the Region.

=== Political groups (2025–2030) ===
The Regional Council of Apulia is currently composed of the following political groups:

Party	Seats	Status
Democratic Party (PD)	15 / 51	In government
Brothers of Italy (FdI)	11 / 51	In opposition
Decaro for President	7 / 51	In government
Forza Italia (FI)	5 / 51	In opposition
For Apulia (PP)	4 / 51	In government
Five Star Movement (M5S)	4 / 51	In government
Lega	4 / 51	In opposition
Mixed group	1 / 51	In opposition

By coalition:

Party	Seats	Status
Centre-left coalition	30 / 51	Government
Centre-right coalition	21 / 51	Opposition

=== Historical composition ===
Election	DC	PCI	PSI	PLI	PRI	PSDI	MSI	Others	Total
7 June 1970	22	14	5	1	1	-	4	3	50
15 June 1975	21	15	5	1	1	2	5	-	50
8 June 1980	22	13	6	1	1	2	4	1	50
12 May 1985	20	13	8	1	1	2	5	-	50
6 May 1990	22	10	10	1	1	2	3	1	50

Election	Majority	Opposition	Council	President of the Region
23 April 1995	Centre-right (Pole for Freedoms) 38 / 63	Centre-left (The Olive Tree) 25 / 63		Salvatore Distaso (1995–2000)
16 April 2000	Centre-right (House of Freedoms) 38 / 60	Centre-left (The Olive Tree) 22 / 60		Raffaele Fitto (2000–2005)
3 April 2005	Centre-left (The Union) 42 / 70	Centre-right (House of Freedoms) 28 / 70		Nichi Vendola (2005–2015)
28 March 2010	Centre-left 39 / 70	Centre-right 27 / 70 UDC 4 / 70		Nichi Vendola (2005–2015)
31 May 2015	Centre-left 30 / 51	CoR 8 / 51 M5S 8 / 51 Centre-right 5 / 51		Michele Emiliano (2015–2026)
20 September 2020	Centre-left 28 / 51	Centre-right 18 / 51 M5S 5 / 51		Michele Emiliano (2015–2026)
23 November 2025	Centre-left 30 / 51	Centre-right 21 / 51		Antonio Decaro (since 2026)

== Presidents ==
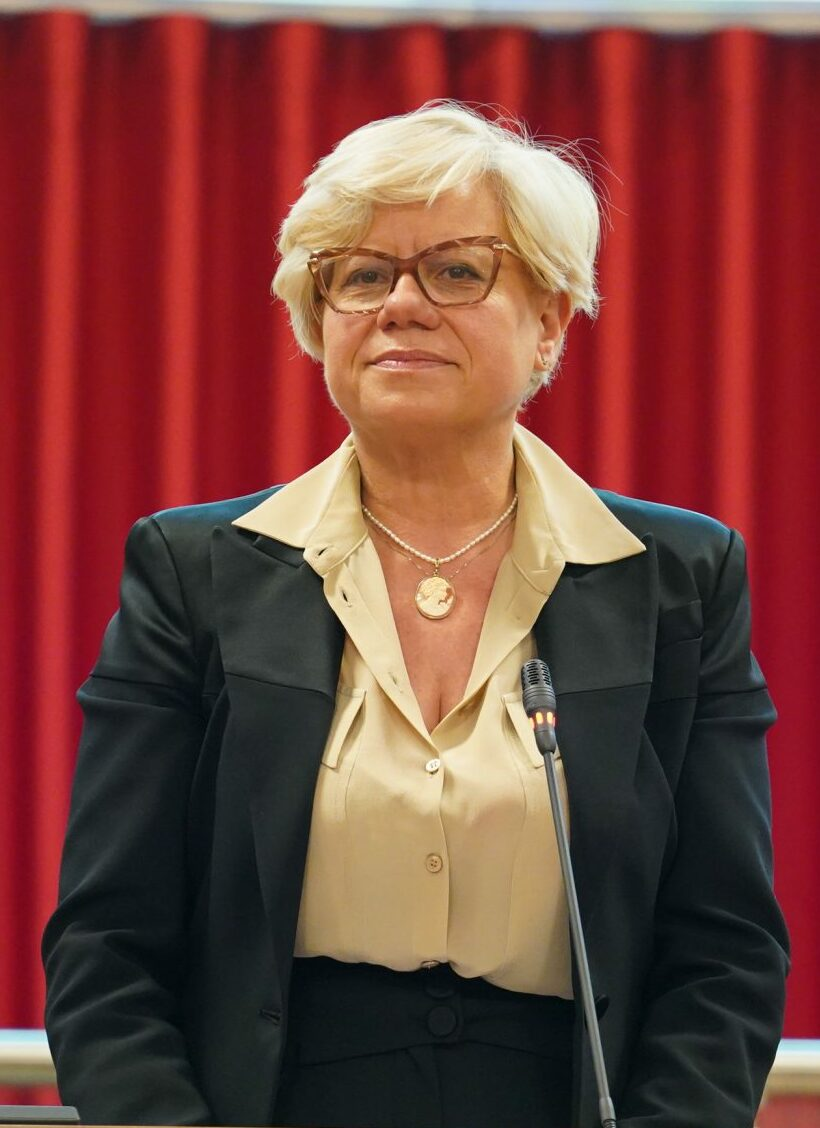
Loredana Capone, president of the Council from 2020 to 2026 and first woman to hold the office.

This is a list of the Presidents of the Regional Council (Italian: Presidenti del Consiglio regionale):

Name	Period		Regional Legislature
Beniamino Finocchiaro (PSI)	20 July 1970	30 July 1975	I (1970)
Luigi Tarricone (PSI)	30 July 1975	8 August 1980	II (1975)
Luigi Tarricone (PSI)	8 August 1980	21 June 1985	III (1980)
Walter Distasio (DC)	21 June 1985	28 October 1985	IV (1985)
Nicola Di Cagno (PLI)	28 October 1985	28 June 1990	IV (1985)
Mario Annese (DC)	28 June 1990	15 December 1992	V (1990)
Cosimo Convertino (PSI)	15 December 1992	20 July 1995	V (1990)
Giovanni Copertino (CCD)	20 July 1995	12 June 2000	VI (1995)
Mario De Cristofaro (AN)	12 June 2000	5 May 2005	VII (2000)
Pietro Pepe (PD)	5 May 2005	27 May 2010	VIII (2005)
Onofrio Introna (SEL)	27 May 2010	22 July 2015	IX (2010)
Mario Loizzo (PD)	22 July 2015	26 November 2020	X (2015)
Loredana Capone (PD)	26 November 2020	2 February 2026	XI (2020)
Toni Matarrelli (PD)	2 February 2026	Incumbent	XII (2025)

== See also ==
- Regional council
- Politics of Apulia
- President of Apulia
