= Giuseppe Martellotta =

Italian politician (1941–2025)

Giuseppe Martellotta (19 November 1941 – 28 June 2025) was an Italian politician.

== Life and career ==
Martellotta was born on 19 November 1941 in Fasano. A member of the Christian Democrats, he was a candidate in the regional elections of 1980 and subsequently in those of 1985 and 1990 in the Brindisi constituency where he obtained 25,107 votes, being elected to the position of councilor; He became president of Apulia in 1994, supported by a center-left coalition, and remained so until the 1995 elections.

Martellotta died in Fasano on 28 June 2025, at the age of 83.
