= Toni Matarrelli =

Italian politician (born 1975)

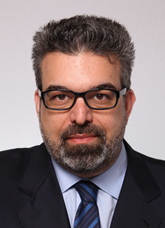
- Matarrelli in 2013

President of the Regional Council of Apulia
- Incumbent
- Assumed office 2 February 2026
- Preceded by: Loredana Capone

President of the Province of Brindisi
- In office 6 March 2022 – 20 October 2025
- Preceded by: Riccardo Rossi
- Succeeded by: Angelo Pomes

Member of the Chamber of Deputies
- In office 15 March 2013 – 22 March 2018
- Constituency: Apulia

Personal details
- Born: 4 February 1975 (age 51) Krefeld, Germany
- Party: PRC (until 2009); SL/SEL (2009–2015); Pos (2015–2017); Art.1 (2017–2019); Ind. (2019–2025); PD (2025–present)

Antonio Matarrelli (born 4 February 1975) is an Italian politician who has served as president of the Regional Council of Apulia since February 2026.

From 2013 to 2018, he was a member of the Chamber of Deputies. He also served as mayor of Mesagne (2019–2025) and president of the Province of Brindisi (2022–2025).

In the 2025 Apulian regional elections, he ran as a Democratic Party candidate in support of centre-left candidate Antonio Decaro and was elected in the Brindisi constituency with 24,499 preference votes.
