= Vito Leccese =

Italian politician

Mayor of Bari
- Incumbent
- Assumed office 9 July 2024
- Preceded by: Antonio Decaro

Member of the Chamber of Deputies
- In office 9 May 1996 – 29 May 2001
- Constituency: Putignano
- In office 23 April 1992 – 14 April 1994
- Constituency: Bari

Personal details
- Born: 2 August 1962 (age 64) Bari, Italy
- Party: Democratic Party (since 2007)
- Other political affiliations: Green Lists (1985-1990); FdV (1990-2001)
- Education: University of Bari
- Occupation: Politician, employee

Vito Leccese (born 2 August 1962) is an Italian politician who serves as Mayor of Bari since 2024.

== Biography ==
In the 1985 local elections, Leccese ran for the city council of Bari with the Federation of Green Lists, and was elected city councillor at just 22 years old. In this capacity, he acted as spokesperson for environmentalist and pacifist demands, for the defence of the city's historic villas and against the construction of the new San Nicola stadium.

In 1986, in Finale Ligure, he signed the founding act of the Federation of Green Lists and the following year he was involved in the victorious referendum campaign on nuclear power.

=== Member of the Chamber ===
In the 1992 elections, Leccese was a candidate for the Chamber of Deputies, among the Green lists in the Bari-Foggia constituency, being elected deputy with over 5,000 preferences, at just 29 years of age. During the 11th legislature he was part of the Culture, Science and Education Commission, of the Antimafia Commission and of the Italian Delegation to the parliamentary assemblies of the Council of Europe and the Western European Union.

After failing re-election in the 1994 elections, Leccese managed to be elected at the Chamber of Deputies in the 1996 elections; he was appointed vice-president of the Foreign and Community Affairs commission, dealing with foreign policy, protection of human rights and democratic guarantees, and carrying out some missions as an "international observer" in conflict zones in Bosnia, Albania, Serbia, Turkey and Iraq.

After the 2001 elections, disappointed by the electoral defeat in his constituency and in contrast with the new leadership of Alfonso Pecoraro Scanio in the Greens, he distanced himself from politics.

From 2007 to 2009 and from 2014 to 2023, Leccese served as the chief of staff to Mayors of Bari Michele Emiliano and Antonio Decaro.

=== Mayor of Bari ===
In the 2024 Italian local elections, Leccese, now a member of the Democratic Party, became the candidate of the centre-left coalition for the office of Mayor of Bari, supported by his party and by Green Europe. After obtaining 48.02% of votes at the first round, Leccese managed to win the run-off with 70.27% of votes, gaining support from the Five Star Movement and Italian Left, being elected Mayor.

== Electoral history ==
Election	House	Constituency	Party	Votes	Result	Notes
1992	Chamber of Deputies	Bari–Foggia	FdV	4,074	Elected	
1994	Chamber of Deputies	Bari – Libertà Marconi	FdV	25,922	Not elected	
1995	Regional Council of Apulia	Bari	FdV	2,770	Elected	
1996	Chamber of Deputies	Putignano	FdV	38,467	Elected	
2001	Chamber of Deputies	Bari – Mola di Bari	FdV	31,560	Not elected	
