= Popular Apulia =

Popular Apulia Puglia Popolare
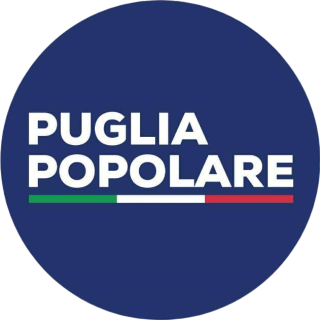
- Leader: Massimo Cassano
- Founded: 21 July 2017
- Split from: Popular Alternative
- Ideology: Christian democracy
- Political position: Centre
- National affiliation: League
- Regional Council of Apulia: 0 / 51

Website
- pugliapopolare.it

Popular Apulia (Puglia Popolare) is a political party active in Apulia, Italy.

== History ==
The party was founded in July 2017 by Massimo Cassano, former undersecretary for Labor and Social Policies in the Renzi and Gentiloni Cabinets (in NCD/AP share). The new party was also joined by the Apulian regional councilors Giovanni Stea and Luigi Morgante (members of the Popular Area group and was initially located in the centre-right coalition. The party then joined the centre-left coalition and on the basis of this alliance, in 2018, Stea was appointed was appointed Assessor for the Environment in the regional government led by Michele Emiliano, while on 7 January 2019 Cassano, was appointed extraordinary commissioner of the Regional agency for active employment policies (ARPAL). Since 2019, the party has participated in the Apulian municipal elections in support of centre-left candidates for mayor, electing several municipal councilors.

Ahead of the 2019 European Parliament election, Cassano reached an agreement with Bruno Tabacci, the national President of More Europe, to include a candidate from Popular Apulia in the party lists for the southern constituency.

At the 2020 Apulian regional election, the party presented its candidates in the "Populars with Emiliano" list, together with exponents of the Democratic Centre and former members of AP and of UDC. The list scored 5.9% of the votes and got seven regional councilors. Furthermore, Stea reconfirmed his role as assessor in the regional government.

In August 2021, there was a political break between Cassano and Stea, which led Popular Apulia to split from the Populars (meanwhile structured as a full-fledged party and led by former senator Salvatore Ruggeri). On February 28, the component headed by Cassano (including Sergio Clemente, member of Popular Apulia) left the group of the Populars in the regional council to join a new group, named "For Apulia", remaining in the majority supporting Michele Emiliano.

On the occasion of the 2022 Italian general election, Popular Apulia joined the Action – Italia Viva list and Cassano was one of its candidates for the Chamber of Deputies in Apulia, without being elected.

In February 2023, Cassano announced the merger of Popular Apulia into the Union of the Centre and his return to the centre-right coalition. In September 2024, however, the affiliation with UdC was broken.

With a view to 2025 Apulian regional election, in August 2025 the party joined the League.
