= Apulia First of All =

Italian political party

Apulia First of All (La Puglia Prima di Tutto, PPT) is a regionalist-centrist political party in Italy active in Apulia, as local branch of Forza Italia.

The party was launched in 2005 as a civic list in support of Raffaele Fitto, the outgoing President of the Region of Forza Italia. In the 2005 regional election PPT gained 9.2% of the vote and 5 seats in the Regional Council, while Fitto was defeated by Nichi Vendola.

The party has since organized on a stable basis and gained some autonomy from Fitto, although it can be considered a sort of sister-party of The People of Freedom, the party in which Fitto and Forza Italia merged in 2009. Since then, PPT has been led by Salvatore Greco, a former deputy of the Union of Christian and Centre Democrats. In the 2010 regional election, the party obtained 7.1% and 4 regional councillors, including Greco.

In the 2012 elections, the party presented itself in alliance with the People of Freedom in all the provincial capitals that voted, obtaining results that varied between 1% in Taranto and 11% in Trani, where one of its members, Luigi Nicola Riserbato, won the centre-right primaries and was elected mayor, thanks to a centre-right coalition.
