= Nicola Rotolo =

Italian politician (1925–2024)

President of Apulia
- In office 16 June 1975 – 23 December 1978
- Preceded by: Gennaro Trisorio Liuzzi
- Succeeded by: Nicola Quarta

Personal details
- Born: 20 July 1925 Castellana Grotte, Italy
- Died: 13 September 2024 (aged 99)
- Party: DC
- Occupation: Lawyer

Nicola Rotolo (20 July 1925 – 13 September 2024) was an Italian lawyer and politician. A member of Christian Democracy, he served as President of Apulia from 1975 to 1978.

Rotolo died on 13 September 2024, at the age of 99.
