= Chiara Gribaudo =

Italian politician (born 1981)

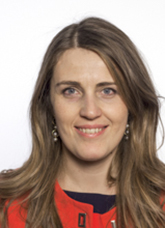
- Gribaudo in 2018

Vice President of the Democratic Party
- Incumbent
- Assumed office 12 March 2023 Serving with Loredana Capone
- President: Stefano Bonaccini
- Preceded by: Debora Serracchiani; Anna Ascani

Member of the Chamber of Deputies
- Incumbent
- Assumed office 15 March 2013
- Constituency: Piedmont 2

Personal details
- Born: 16 May 1981 (age 45) Cuneo, Italy
- Party: Democratic Party
- Education: University of Turin
- Profession: Educator

Chiara Gribaudo (born 16 May 1981) is an Italian politician of the Democratic Party who has served in the Chamber of Deputies since 2013. She was first elected in the 2013 general election, and was re-elected in 2018 and 2022. Since 2023, she has served as vice president of the Democratic Party.

== Biography ==
Gribaudo was born in Cuneo, where she graduated from the Franco ANPI Commercial Institute and served as president of the city’s Youth Council. She joined the National Association of Italian Partisans at a very young age. She is an educator with a degree in Primary Education.

She served as a city councilor in Valdieri (Cuneo) from 2001 to 2006, city councilor in Borgo San Dalmazzo (Cuneo) from 2007 to 2017, and councilor for the environment, information technology, youth, and European policies on the Borgo San Dalmazzo city council led by Gianpaolo Beretta from 2012 to 2014.

In 2012, she supported the candidacy of PD Secretary Pier Luigi Bersani in the center-left primary “Italia. Bene Comune” to select the nomination for presidency of the Council of Ministers (Italy).
