= Anna Ascani =

Italian politician (born 1987)

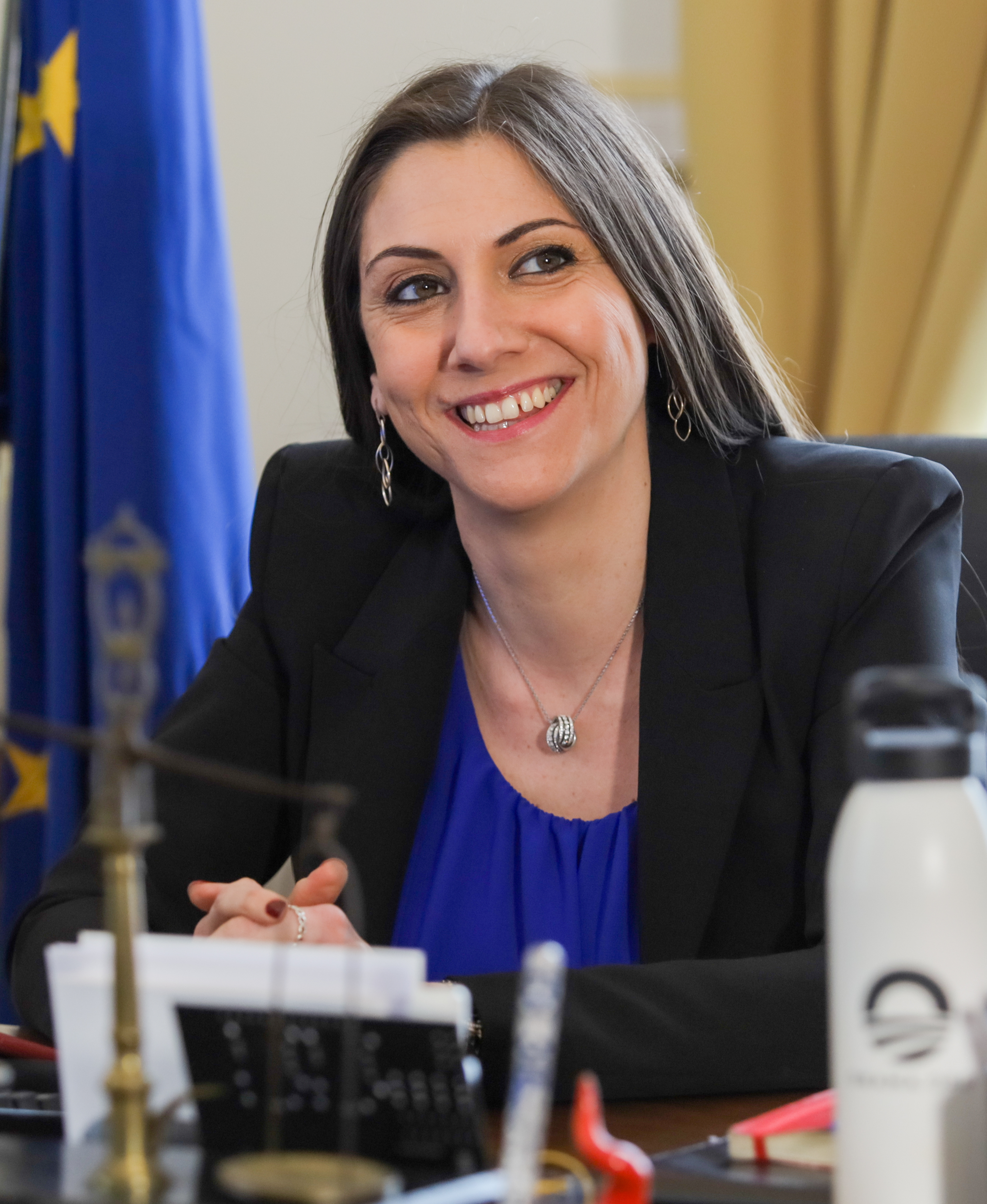

Vice-President of the Chamber of Deputies
- Incumbent
- Assumed office 19 October 2022
- President: Lorenzo Fontana

Vice President of the Democratic Party
- In office 17 March 2019 – 12 March 2023 Serving with Debora Serracchiani
- President: Paolo Gentiloni (2019–20); Valentina Cuppi (since 2020)
- Preceded by: Barbara Pollastrini; Domenico De Santis
- Succeeded by: Loredana Capone; Chiara Gribaudo

Member of the Chamber of Deputies
- Incumbent
- Assumed office 25 March 2013
- Constituency: Umbria

Personal details
- Born: 17 October 1987 (age 38) Città di Castello, Italy
- Party: DL (2006–2007); PD (since 2007)
- Education: University of Perugia; University of Trento
- Occupation: Politician

Anna Ascani (born 17 October 1987) is an Italian politician.

== Biography ==
Ascani obtained a Bachelor in Philosophy in 2009 at the University of Perugia, and a master's degree at the University of Trento in 2012. In 2024 she concluded PhD programme in Politics at the LUISS University.

In 2006, at the age of 18, Ascani ran for a seat in the city council of her birth town Città di Castello in Umbria. The following year, with the birth of the Democratic Party and the 2007 primaries, she supported Enrico Letta.

=== Political career ===
At the 2013 general election, Ascani was elected to the Chamber of Deputies. That same year, during the 2013 primaries, she supported Matteo Renzi, later elected Secretary. She supported Renzi again at the 2017 primaries.

In 2016, Forbes named Ascani as one of the 30 most influential under 30 European politicians.

After having been re-elected to the Chamber of Deputies at the 2018 general election, she ran at the 2019 primaries as the running mate of Roberto Giachetti. They ranked third, but Ascani was appointed, together with Debora Serracchiani, vice president of the Democratic Party.
