= Simeone Di Cagno Abbrescia =

Italian politician (1944–2024)

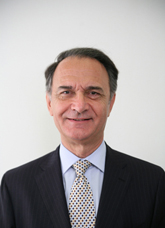

Mayor of Bari
- In office 22 June 1995 – 14 June 2004
- Preceded by: Giovanni Memola
- Succeeded by: Michele Emiliano

Member of the Chamber of Deputies
- In office 28 April 2006 – 14 March 2013
- Constituency: Apulia

Personal details
- Born: 1 April 1944 Palo del Colle, Italy
- Died: 29 March 2024 (aged 79) Bari, Italy
- Party: Forza Italia (1994–2009); PdL (2009–2013)
- Occupation: Entrepreneur, politician

Simeone Di Cagno Abbrescia (1 April 1944 – 29 March 2024) was an Italian politician who served as mayor of Bari.

== Biography ==
Simeone Di Cagno Abbrescia was born on 1 April 1944. He graduated in Law at the University of Bari and, as an entrepreneur, worked in the real estate and tourism sectors.

Di Cagno Abbrescia joined Forza Italia at its foundation. He has been elected mayor of Bari in 1995, and was reconfirmed in 1999, holding the position until 2004. After the 2006 elections, he was elected for the Chamber of Deputies with Forza Italia, where he was reconfirmed in the 2008 elections with The People of Freedom.

In 2009 he was again the mayoral candidate of Bari, supported by the centre-right coalition, being defeated by the incumbent mayor Michele Emiliano.

On 20 March 2018, the Apulian Regional Council renewed the board of Apulian Aqueduct, appointing Di Cagno Abbrescia as new president.

Di Cagno Abbrescia died in Bari on 29 March 2024, three days before his 80th birthday.
