= 2025 Apulian regional election =

Italian regional election

- 23–24 November 2025

All 51 seats to the Regional Council of Apulia
- Opinion polls
- Registered: 3,527,187
- Turnout: 41.83% (▼14.60pp)
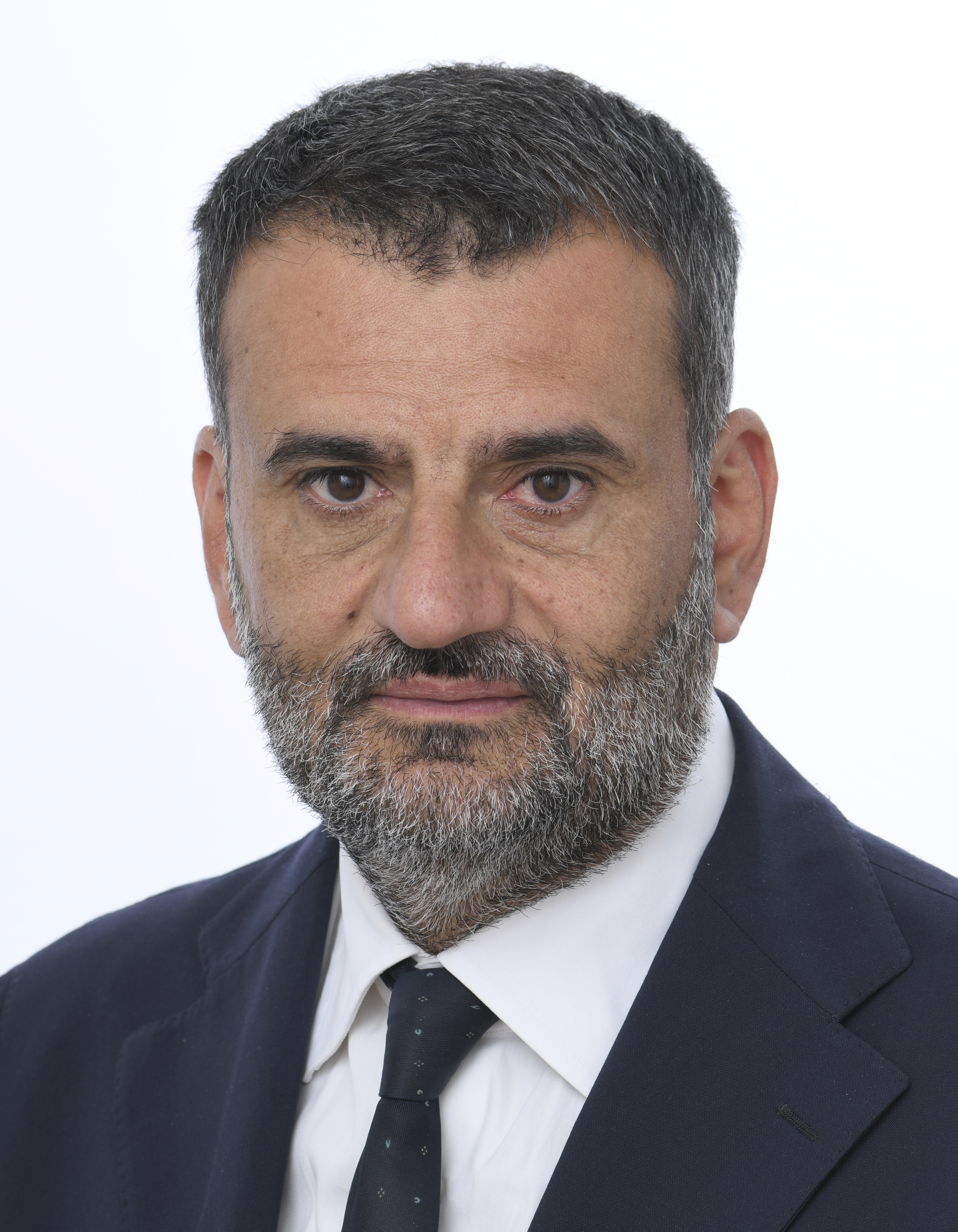

	Majority party	Minority party
Leader	Antonio Decaro	Luigi Lobuono
Party	PD	Independent
Alliance	Centre-left	Centre-right
Seats won	30	21
Seat change	▼3 (Note: This is compared to the total of Michele Emiliano (Centre-left coalition) and Antonella Laricchia (M5S) in 2020.)	▲3
Popular vote	919,665	505,055
Percentage	63.97%	35.13%
Swing	▲6.07pp	▼3.80pp
- Map of the election result
President before election
Michele Emiliano
PD
Elected President
Antonio Decaro
PD

The 2025 Apulian regional election was held in Apulia, Italy, from 23 to 24 November 2025.

== Electoral system ==
The Regional Council of Apulia is made up of 51 seats, in which, one is reserved for the President and the second place candidate, per the electorate law. The first 23 seats are divided at the district level and the remaining 27 at the level of the single regional constituency. The law provides for a single round, with list voting, the possibility of expressing two preferences of different gender within the chosen list, and voting for the candidate for president, on a single ballot.

It is possible to vote for a slate and a candidate for the chair that are not connected to each other (split vote).

Seat distribution of the Regional Council of Apulia
Provinces	Seats
Bari	16
Brindisi	5
Foggia	8
Lecce	8
Taranto	7
BAT	6
President	1
Total	51

The candidate who obtains the majority (even only relative) of the votes is elected President of the Region. The lists linked to the elected president are eventually assigned a majority bonus in the following measure:

- At least 29 seats if the elected president has obtained a percentage of preferences higher than 40%
- At least 28 seats if the elected president has obtained a percentage of preferences between 35% and 40%.
- If it falls below 35%, at least 27 councilors would be assigned.

The law provides for a threshold of 8% for coalitions and lists that run on their own and 4% for lists that present themselves in a coalition.

== Parties and candidates ==
=== Presidential candidate ===
Candidate	Experience	Alliance
Antonio Decaro	Member of the European Parliament for Southern Italy (2024–present); Mayor of Bari (2014–2024); Member of the Chamber of Deputies (2013–2014)	Centre-left coalition
Luigi Lobuono	President of the Fiera del Levante (2001–2006); Candidate for Mayor of Bari (2004)	Centre-right coalition

=== Parties and coalitions ===
Political party or alliance	Constituent lists	Previous result		Candidate
Political party or alliance	Constituent lists	Votes (%)	Seats	Candidate
Centre-left coalition	Democratic Party (incl. +Eu)	17.3	16	Antonio Decaro
Centre-left coalition	Five Star Movement (incl. PRC)	9.9	5	Antonio Decaro
Centre-left coalition	Greens and Left Alliance (incl. Pos and MET)	3.8	–	Antonio Decaro
Centre-left coalition	Decaro for President (incl. PSI)	—N/a	—N/a	Antonio Decaro
Centre-left coalition	For Apulia (incl. Con)	—N/a	—N/a	Antonio Decaro
Centre-left coalition	Forward Populars with Decaro (incl. Az and DemoS)	—N/a	—N/a	Antonio Decaro
Centre-right coalition	Brothers of Italy (incl. ScN and PdF)	12.6	6	Luigi Lobuono
Centre-right coalition	League – NPSI – UDC (inc. PP)	11.5	4	Luigi Lobuono
Centre-right coalition	Forza Italia	8.9	4	Luigi Lobuono
Centre-right coalition	Us Moderates – Civics for Lobuono	—N/a	—N/a	Luigi Lobuono
Centre-right coalition	Apulia With Us (incl. DC, CDL)	—N/a	—N/a	Luigi Lobuono
Pacifist and Popular Apulia (incl. PaP, PCI and RS)		0.4	–	Ada Donno
Civic Alliance for Apulia		—N/a	—N/a	Sabino Mangano

== Opinion polls ==
=== Presidential candidates ===
Date	Polling firm	Client	Sample size	Margin of error	Decaro	Lobuono	Donno	Mangano	Others	Lead
5 November 2025	Ipsos	Corriere della Sera	800	±3.5	63.8	33.1	2.2	0.9		30.7
5 November 2025	Noto	Porta a Porta	-	-	65.0	33.0	2.0			32
7 November 2025	Tecnè srl	Agenzia Dire	1000	±3.1	62–66	32–36	1–3			30
7 November 2025	Only Numbers	Gazzetta del Mezzogiorno	800	±3.5	59.8–64.0	34.0–38.2	0.7–1.7	0.4–1.2		25.8

=== Electoral lists ===
Publication date	Institute	Client	Sample	Margin of error	PD	M5S	AVS	A-Pop	Dec-P	PlP	FdI	Lega–UDC–NPSI	FI	NM	DC–LPCN	PPP	AC	Lead
5 November 2025	Ipsos	Corriere della Sera	800	±3.5	23.5	8.7	5.6	5.9	13.2	6.3	17.3	4.5	9.6	1.6	0.8	2.1	0.9	6.2
7 November 2025	Tecnè	Agenzia Dire	1000	±3.1	22–26	7–11	4–8	23–27			15–12	2–6	8–12	1–5		1–3		7

== Outcome ==
=== Result ===
23–24 November 2025 Apulian regional election results
Candidates	Votes	%	Seats	Parties	Votes	%	Seats
Antonio Decaro	919,753	63.98	1				
Antonio Decaro	919,753	63.98	1	Democratic Party	344,229	25.91	14
Antonio Decaro	919,753	63.98	1	Decaro for President	168,944	12.72	7
Antonio Decaro	919,753	63.98	1	For Apulia	113,515	8.54	4
Antonio Decaro	919,753	63.98	1	Five Star Movement	95,963	7.22	4
Antonio Decaro	919,753	63.98	1	Greens and Left Alliance	54,358	4.09	0
Antonio Decaro	919,753	63.98	1	Forward Populars with Decaro	54,306	4.09	0
Antonio Decaro	919,753	63.98	1	Total	831.315	62.57	29
Luigi Lobuono	505,146	35.14	1				
Luigi Lobuono	505,146	35.14	1	Brothers of Italy	248,905	18.73	11
Luigi Lobuono	505,146	35.14	1	Forza Italia	121,014	9.11	5
Luigi Lobuono	505,146	35.14	1	League	106,852	8.04	4
Luigi Lobuono	505,146	35.14	1	Us Moderates	10,997	0.83	0
Luigi Lobuono	505,146	35.14	1	Apulia With Us	1,127	0.08	0
Luigi Lobuono	505,146	35.14	1	Total	488,895	36.80	20
Ada Donno	10,070	0.70	0	Pacifist and Popular Apulia	6,734	0.51	0
Sabino Mangano	2,642	0.18	0	Civic Alliance for Apulia	1,683	0.13	0
Blank and invalid votes	37,826	2.56					
Total candidates	1,437,611	100.0	2	Total parties	1,328,628	100.0	49
Registered voters/turnout	1,475,437	41.83					
Source: Apulia Region – Results

Popular vote by party
PD	25.91%
FdI	18.73%
Decaro	12.72%
FI	9.11%
PlP	8.54%
Lega	8.04%
M5S	7.22%
AVS	4.09%
AP	4.09%
Others	1.55%

Popular vote by president
Decaro	63.98%
Lobuono	35.14%
Others	0.88%

=== Turnout ===
Voter turnout
Constituency	Sunday, November 23			Monday, November 24	Previous Election	
Constituency	12:00 PM	19:00 PM	23:00 PM	15:00 PM	Previous Election	
Bari	9.00%	23.89%	30.07%	42.30%	56.87%	▼14.56%
Barletta-Andria-Trani	8.52%	22.65%	28.81%	41.22%	59.98%	▼18.76%
Brindisi	8.62%	24.33%	29.58%	41.94%	54.80%	▼12.89%
Foggia	7.18%	20.44%	26.15%	38.61%	52.74%	▼14.13%
Lecce	9.40%	27.33%	32.15%	44.50%	58.12%	▼13.62%
Taranto	7.69%	22.09%	27.90%	40.60%	55.75%	▼15.15%
(Apulia) Total	8.55%	23.75%	29.44%	41.82%	56.43%	▼14.60%

=== Analysis ===
Antonio Decaro won with 64% of the total votes, winning all provinces with at least 53% of the votes. He was the strongest in his former bailiwick, the Metropolitan City of Bari, where he received over 70% of the votes, and also in the Province of Foggia, where he also won more than two-thirds of the vote.

Luigi Lobuono was stronger in the Salento area, especially in the province of Lecce, where he won 45.32% of the vote, but still lost to Decaro by 8.5 points, and in Taranto, where he won nearly 40 percent of the vote, though still lost to Decaro by 20 points.

Decaro swept the region's 26 cities with population over 30,000, with Lobuono winning only one (Nardò), by 15.5 points. Decaro won his hometown Bari by 71.5%, with a 44.5% margin. The only provincial capital where Lobuono received over 40% of the vote was Lecce, albeit barely (40.35%) and still lost to Decaro by 18 points.

Decaro V Lobuono by provinces
Province	Antonio Decaro	Luigi Lobuono	Others
Foggia	137,246 68.62%	61,456 30.73%	1,298 0.65%
Barletta-Andria-Trani	85,405 63.89%	47,424 35.48%	853 0.64%
Bari	322,722 70.37%	131,244 28.62%	4,641 1.01%
Taranto	113,292 59.34%	75,924 39.77%	1,696 0.89%
Brindisi	92,634 65.82%	46,860 33.30%	1,246 0.88%
Lecce	168,366 53.68%	142,147 45.32%	3,155 1.01%

Decaro V Lobuono by major cities
City	Antonio Decaro	Luigi Lobuono	Others
Bari	81,866 71.51%	30,837 26.94%	1,771 1.55%
Taranto	33,283 63.06%	18,908 35.82%	592 1.12%
Foggia	32,925 69.36%	14,055 29.61%	491 1.04%
Andria	22,512 65.02%	11,944 34.50%	169 0.48%
Lecce	20,184 58.34%	13,959 40.35%	454 1.31%
Barletta	22,811 63.52%	12,886 35.88%	216 0.60%
Brindisi	18,204 64.78%	9,672 34.42%	225 0.80%
Altamura	16,609 64.48%	8,976 34.85%	173 0.67%
Molfetta	16,420 80.06%	3,836 18.70%	253 1.23%
Cerignola	8,409 57.50%	6,146 42.02%	70 0.48%
Trani	12,290 62.17%	7,348 37.17%	131 0.67%
Bisceglie	13,488 74.47%	4,462 24.63%	163 0.90%
Manfredonia	12,006 68.44%	5,429 30.95%	108 0.62%
Bitonto	13,300 69.52%	5,698 29.78%	134 0.70%
San Severo	10,098 71.56%	3,941 27.93%	73 0.52%
Monopoli	10,819 62.86%	6,275 36.46%	118 0.69%
Corato	11,210 67.90%	5,142 31.15%	157 0.95%
Martina Franca	11,261 56.62%	8,435 42.41%	191 0.96%
Gravina in Puglia	8,623 59.23%	5,856 40.22%	80 0.55%
Fasano	9,577 68.24%	4,358 31.05%	99 0.71%
Modugno	11,280 81.57%	2,416 17.47%	132 0.95%
Francavilla Fontana	7,075 62.39%	4,174 36.81%	91 0.81%
Massafra	7,168 69.59%	3,096 30.06%	36 0.35%
Nardò	6,103 41.98%	8,353 57.46%	81 0.56%

=== Elected councilors ===
Party / List	Councilor elected	Preference votes	Constituency

== See also ==
- 2025 Italian local elections
