= Loredana Capone =

Italian politician (born 1964)

- Capone in 2024.

Vice President of the Democratic Party
- Incumbent
- Assumed office 12 March 2023 Serving with Chiara Gribaudo
- President: Stefano Bonaccini
- Preceded by: Debora Serracchiani; Anna Ascani

President of the Regional Council of Apulia
- In office 26 November 2020 – 2 February 2026
- Preceded by: Mario Loizzo
- Succeeded by: Toni Matarrelli

Personal details
- Born: 14 February 1964 (age 62) Lecce, Italy
- Party: Democratic Party (since 2007)
- Other political affiliations: PPI (1994-2002); DL (2002-2007)
- Education: University of Bari
- Profession: Lawyer

Loredana Capone (born 14 February 1964) is an Italian politician who served as president of the Regional Council of Apulia from 2020 to 2026. She has served as vice president of the Democratic Party since 2023.

== Biography ==
Born in Lecce, where she currently resides, she earned a law degree and has been a practicing administrative lawyer since 1991. From 1993 to 1996, she taught Law and economics at the Giuseppe Palmieri Classical High School in Lecce. She is married and the mother of four daughters.

From 1994 to 1995, she Magistrate as an honorary judge at the District Court of Lecce.
