= Christian Democrats for Freedom =

Christian Democrats for Freedom Cristiani Democratici per la Libertà
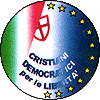
- Leader: Roberto Formigoni
- Founded: 1998
- Dissolved: 2001
- Split from: United Christian Democrats
- Merged into: Forza Italia
- Ideology: Christian democracy
- Political position: Centre

Christian Democrats for Freedom (Italian: Cristiani Democratici per la Libertà, CDL) was a small christian-democratic political party in Italy.

== History ==
The party was founded following a split from the United Christian Democrats of Rocco Buttiglione, who intended to abandon the centre-right alliance to join the Democratic Union for the Republic, conceived by Francesco Cossiga. The political line pursued by Buttiglione, however, was harshly opposed by leading members of the CDU: the Lombard president Roberto Formigoni and the Apulian exponent Raffaele Fitto.

On 4 April 1998 the assembly of centrists was held in Rome, promoted by Fitto and Formigoni. It was on this occasion that Fitto and Formigoni announced the birth of the CdL. Three senators joined the new party: Rosario Giorgio Costa, Tomaso Zanoletti and Ida Maria Dentamaro.

The CdL approached the Christian Democratic Centre of Pier Ferdinando Casini and the two parties made an agreement in view of the administrative elections of 1998. In 2001 CdL merged with Forza Italia.
