= Giuseppe Colasanto =

President of Apulia
- In office 23 November 1988 – 6 May 1990
- Preceded by: Salvatore Fitto
- Succeeded by: Michele Bellomo

Mayor of Andria
- In office 1967–1972
- Preceded by: Francesco Fuzio
- Succeeded by: Luigi Sperone

Personal details
- Born: 23 November 1918 Terlizzi, Province of Bari, Kingdom of Italy
- Died: 13 August 1991 (aged 72) Bari, Apulia, Italy
- Party: Christian Democracy
- Profession: Teacher

Giuseppe Colasanto (23 November 1918 – 13 August 1991) was an Italian teacher and politician of the Christian Democracy party. He served as mayor of Andria from 1967 to 1972, and was elected to the Regional Council of Apulia. Colasanto served as president of Apulia from 1988 to 1990.
