= Giovanni Copertino =

Italian politician (born 1943)

President of the Regional Council of Apulia
- In office 25 July 1995 – 12 June 2000
- Preceded by: Rosario Rinaldi
- Succeeded by: Mario De Cristofaro

President of Apulia
- In office 4 December 1992 – 3 September 1993
- Preceded by: Cosimo Convertino
- Succeeded by: Vito Savino

Member of the Regional Council of Apulia
- In office 20 January 2015 – 2 July 2015
- In office 28 June 1990 – 30 March 2010

President of the Province of Bari
- In office 27 July 1987 – 10 August 1990
- Preceded by: Giuseppe Casone
- Succeeded by: Domenico Ricchiuti

Personal details
- Born: 25 January 1943 Monopoli, Province of Bari, Kingdom of Italy
- Party: Christian Democracy; Christian Democratic Centre; Union of Christian and Centre Democrats; The People of Freedom; Forza Italia
- Profession: Forestry officer

Giovanni Copertino (born 25 January 1943) is an Italian politician and former forestry officer who served as president of Apulia, president of the Regional Council of Apulia and president of the Province of Bari.

== Career ==
A member of Christian Democracy from an early age, he was elected to the municipal council of Monopoli in 1975 and served twice as mayor, from 1977 to 1980 and from 1984 to 1985.

Copertino was elected to the Provincial Council of Bari in 1980 and 1985 and served as provincial assessor for agriculture before becoming president of the Province of Bari in 1987. In 1990 he was elected to the Regional Council of Apulia and served as president of Apulia from December 1992 to September 1993.

Following the dissolution of Christian Democracy, Copertino joined the Christian Democratic Centre and was re-elected to the regional council. He later joined the People of Freedom and then Forza Italia. He served as its president from 1995 to 2000 and remained a regional councillor until 2010. In 2015, he entered the regional council again for few months.
