= 1975 Apulian regional election =

Italian regional election

The Apulian regional election of 1975 took place on 15 June 1975.

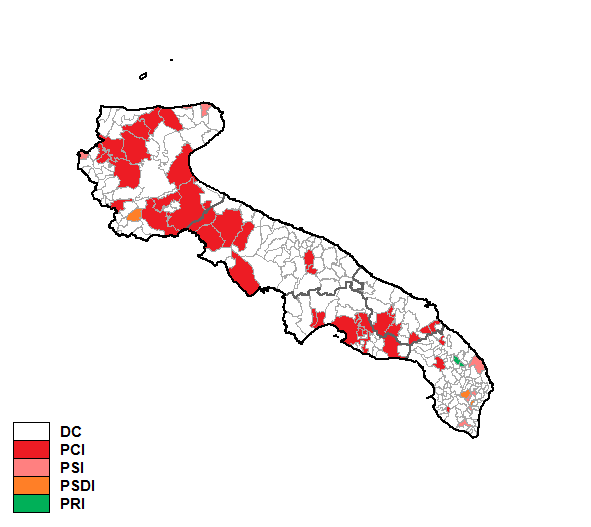
Largest party by municipality

== Events ==
Christian Democracy was by far the largest party, while the Italian Communist Party came distantly second. After the election Christian Democrat Nicola Rotolo was elected President of the Region at the head of a centre-left coalition (Organic Centre-left). In 1978 Rotolo was replaced by fellow Christian Democrat Nicola Quarta.

== Results ==
Parties	votes	votes (%)	seats
Christian Democracy	834,234	39.2	21
Italian Communist Party	607,004	28.6	15
Italian Socialist Party	252,487	11.9	5
Italian Social Movement	228,875	10.8	5
Italian Democratic Socialist Party	99,949	4.7	2
Italian Republican Party	48,860	2.3	1
Italian Liberal Party	35,708	1.7	1
Popular Unity	16,595	0.8	-
Independent	2,068	0.1	-
Total	2,125,780	100.0	50

Source: Ministry of the Interior
