= Antonio Decaro =

Italian politician (born 1970)

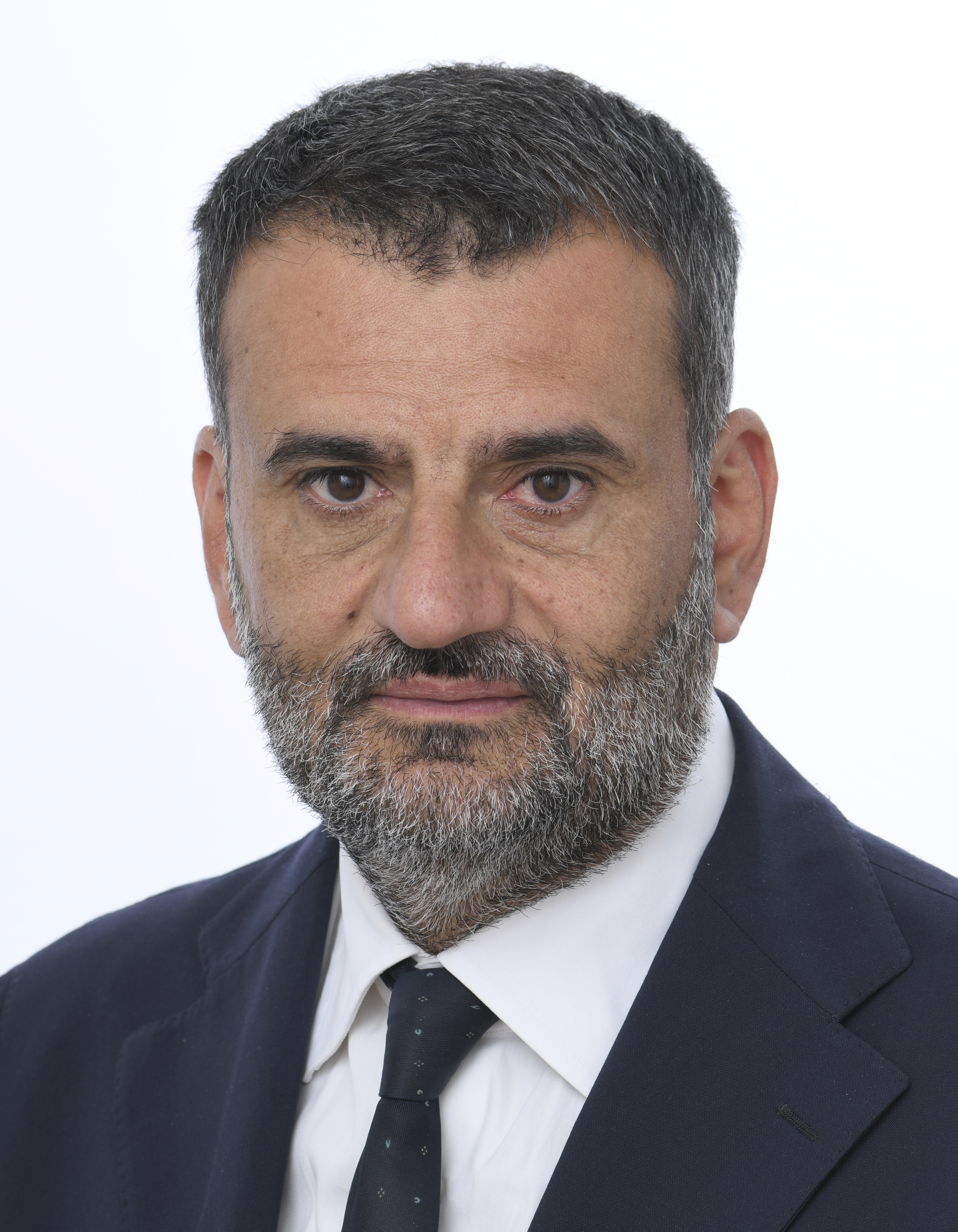

President of Apulia
- Incumbent
- Assumed office 7 January 2026
- Preceded by: Michele Emiliano

Member of the European Parliament
- In office 16 July 2024 – 1 February 2026
- Succeeded by: Georgia Tramacere
- Constituency: Southern Italy

Mayor of Bari
- In office 23 June 2014 – 9 July 2024
- Preceded by: Michele Emiliano
- Succeeded by: Vito Leccese

Member of the Chamber of Deputies
- In office 14 March 2013 – 9 July 2014
- Constituency: Apulia

Personal details
- Born: 17 July 1970 (age 56) Bari, Italy
- Party: Democratic Party
- Education: Polytechnic University of Bari
- Occupation: Engineer, politician

Antonio Decaro (born 17 July 1970) is an Italian politician and former Mayor of Bari. He was elected President of Puglia in the 2025 Apulian regional election. He ran as the candidate of the Centre-left coalition, and won with 63.97% of the vote.

== Biography ==
Decaro graduated in engineering from the Polytechnic University of Bari. In his youth, he was a socialist. But after the collapse of the Italian Socialist Party, he moved closer to the Democratic Party, of which he is now one of the best-known members. After a brief work experience as deputy head of the department of the Apulian Aqueduct, he was employed by ANAS in 2000.

In 2004 he was hired by mayor of Bari Michele Emiliano as Councilor for mobility and traffic, distinguishing himself for his environmentalism: Decaro has contributed to the implementation of initiatives and infrastructures that have marked the change in the mobility and traffic policies in Bari. His goal was to empty the city center of cars and redefine the spaces and lifestyle of citizens and commuters.

In 2010 he was elected regional councilor in Apulia as a member of the Democratic Party and was group leader of the party in the regional assembly from 2010 to 2013, when he was elected Deputy after the 2013 elections.

=== Mayor of Bari ===
In January 2014, he announced on his Facebook page his intention to run for mayor of Bari. In June, he is elected mayor, with the support of his predecessor Michele Emiliano, the Democratic Party, Left Ecology Freedom, Italy of Values and the Democratic Centre.

On 12 October 2016, Decaro was elected President of the National Association of Italian Comunes, the association of all the mayors of the country.

On 26 May 2019, Decaro ran for re-election as mayor of Bari. He won handily with nearly two-thirds of the vote (66.27%) in the first round, thus avoiding a runoff.

In 2020, in the midst of the COVID-19 pandemic, Decaro gained popularity on social media for his posts against citizens breaking stay-at-home rules.

=== Member of the European Parliament ===
In 2024, with his second term as mayor coming to an end, Decaro ran for the European Parliament as number two candidate on the Democratic Party list in the Southern Italy constituency. He received 499,661 preference votes in the constituency, only second after Prime Minister Giorgia Meloni (555,720) and was thus elected. In his hometown of Bari, he received 59,339 preference votes - 40% of all votes cast in the city, and besting Meloni by almost 46,000 votes.

On 23 July of the same year, he was elected Chairman of European Parliament Committee on the Environment, Public Health and Food Safety.

=== 2025 Apulian regional election ===
Ahead of the 2025 regional elections, Decaro is running for president of the Puglia region, backed by a coalition made up of the PD, M5S, Alleanza Verdi e Sinistra, The Italian Socialist Party), Azione. In the election, he was elected president with 63.97% of the vote, defeating the center-right candidate, entrepreneur and former mayoral candidate in 2004, Luigi Lobuono (35.13%). He officially took office on January 7, 2026, almost two months after his election.

In a July 2026 Governance Poll by Il Sole 24 Ore, Decaro was with 66% approval the most popular regional president in Italy.

== Electoral history ==
Election	House	Constituency	Party	Votes	Result
2006	Chamber of Deputies	Apulia	SI	– (Note: Candidate in a closed list proportional representation system.)	Not elected
2010	Regional Council of Apulia	Bari	PD	14,190	Elected
2013	Chamber of Deputies	Apulia	PD	– (Note: Elected in a closed list proportional representation system.)	Elected
2024	European Parliament	Southern Italy	PD	499,661	Elected
