= 2000 Apulian regional election =

Italian regional election

- April 16, 2000

All 60 seats to the Regional Council of Apulia
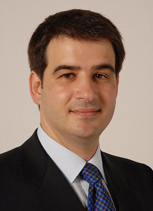

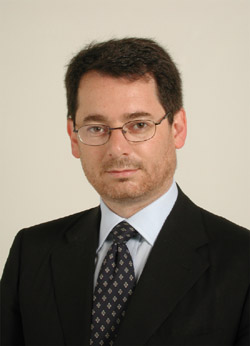
	Majority party	Minority party
Leader	Raffaele Fitto	Giannicola Sinisi
Party	Forza Italia	Democrats
Alliance	Pole for Freedoms	The Olive Tree
Last election	38 seats, 49.8%	25 seats, 45.9%
Seats won	28	22
Seat change	Steady	▼3
Popular vote	1,194,370	986,782
Percentage	54.0%	43.5%
Swing	▲4.2%	▼2.4%
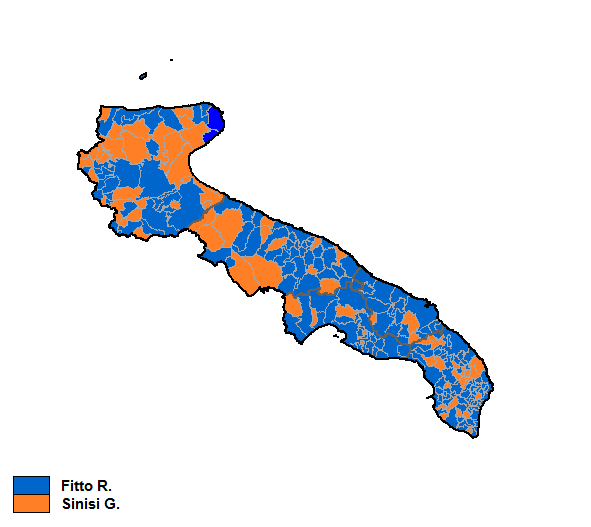
President before election
Salvatore Distaso
Ind.
Elected President
Raffaele Fitto
FI

The Apulian regional election of 2000 took place on 16 April 2000.

Raffaele Fitto (Forza Italia) was elected President, defeating Giannicola Sinisi (Italian People's Party).

== Results ==
16 April 2000 Apulian regional election results
Candidates	Votes	%	Seats	Parties	Votes	%	Seats
Raffaele Fitto	1,194,370	53.97	12				
Raffaele Fitto	1,194,370	53.97	12	Forza Italia	584,147	28.60	15
Raffaele Fitto	1,194,370	53.97	12	National Alliance	315,762	15.46	8
Raffaele Fitto	1,194,370	53.97	12	Christian Democratic Centre	86,734	4.25	2
Raffaele Fitto	1,194,370	53.97	12	United Christian Democrats	41,448	2.03	1
Raffaele Fitto	1,194,370	53.97	12	Christian Democratic Party	23,461	1.15	–
Raffaele Fitto	1,194,370	53.97	12	The Liberals Sgarbi	23,301	1.14	–
Raffaele Fitto	1,194,370	53.97	12	Socialist Party	23,055	1.13	–
Raffaele Fitto	1,194,370	53.97	12	Tricolour Flame	6,689	0.33	–
Raffaele Fitto	1,194,370	53.97	12	The Clover	4,673	0.23	–
Raffaele Fitto	1,194,370	53.97	12	Total	1,109,270	54.30	26
Giannicola Sinisi	961,642	43.45	1				
Giannicola Sinisi	961,642	43.45	1	Democrats of the Left	319,631	15.65	8
Giannicola Sinisi	961,642	43.45	1	Italian People's Party	126,903	6.21	3
Giannicola Sinisi	961,642	43.45	1	The Democrats	124,160	6.08	3
Giannicola Sinisi	961,642	43.45	1	Italian Democratic Socialists	92,194	4.51	2
Giannicola Sinisi	961,642	43.45	1	Communist Refoundation Party	72,689	3.56	1
Giannicola Sinisi	961,642	43.45	1	Union of Democrats for Europe	56,724	2.78	1
Giannicola Sinisi	961,642	43.45	1	Federation of the Greens	36,637	1.79	1
Giannicola Sinisi	961,642	43.45	1	Party of Italian Communists	34,567	1.69	1
Giannicola Sinisi	961,642	43.45	1	Italian Renewal	29,418	1.44	1
Giannicola Sinisi	961,642	43.45	1	Total	892,923	43.71	21
Giancarlo Cito	29,317	1.32	–	Southern Action League	18,839	0.92	–
Danilo Quinto	27,802	1.26	–	Bonino List	21,737	1.06	–
Total candidates	2,213,131	100.00	13	Total parties	2,042,769	100.00	47
Source: Ministry of the Interior – Historical Archive of Elections
