= Nicola Quarta =

Italian politician (1927–2020)

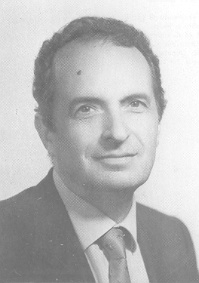

Member of the Chamber of Deputies
- In office 12 July 1983 – 22 April 1992

President of Apulia
- In office 23 December 1978 – 4 July 1983
- Preceded by: Nicola Rotolo
- Succeeded by: Angelo Monfredi

Personal details
- Born: 23 September 1927 Campi Salentina, Italy
- Died: 27 June 2020 (aged 92) Lecce, Italy
- Party: Christian Democracy
- Occupation: Lawyer, politician

Nicola Quarta (23 September 1927 – 27 June 2020) was an Italian politician.

Quarta was born in Campi Salentina on 23 September 1927, and later served as its mayor for two terms. Throughout his political career, Quarta was affiliated with Christian Democracy. He was a prefect until 1970, when he left office to run for the newly established Apulia regional council. Quarta was President of Apulia between 1978 and 1983. He was subsequently elected to two terms as a member of the Chamber of Deputies until 1992. Quarta retired from politics in 1995, and died on 27 June 2020.
