= 2020 Apulian regional election =

Italian regional election

- 20–21 September 2020

All 51 seats to the Regional Council of Apulia
- Turnout: 56.4% (▲5.3%)
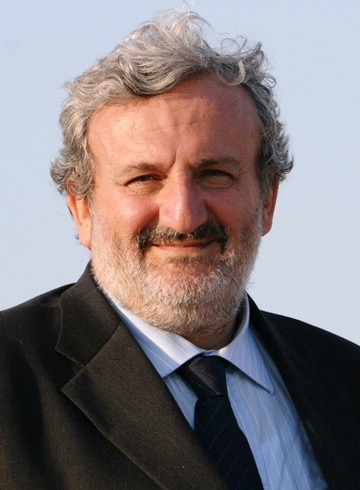

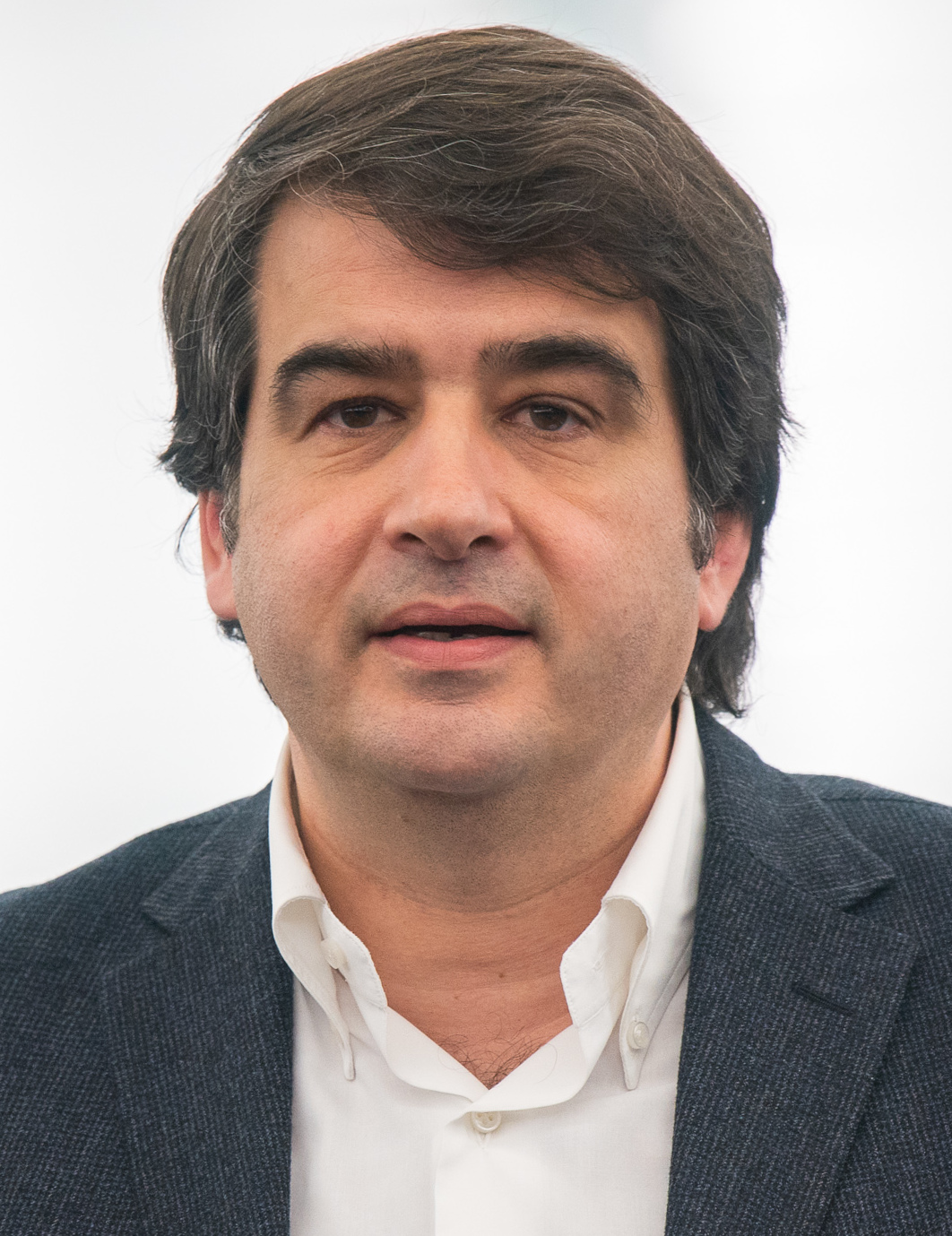
	Majority party	Minority party
Leader	Michele Emiliano	Raffaele Fitto
Party	Independent	Brothers of Italy
Alliance	Centre-left	Centre-right
Seats won	28	18
Seat change	▼2	▲5
Popular vote	871,028	724,928
Percentage	46.8%	38.9%
Swing	▼0.3%	▲6.2%
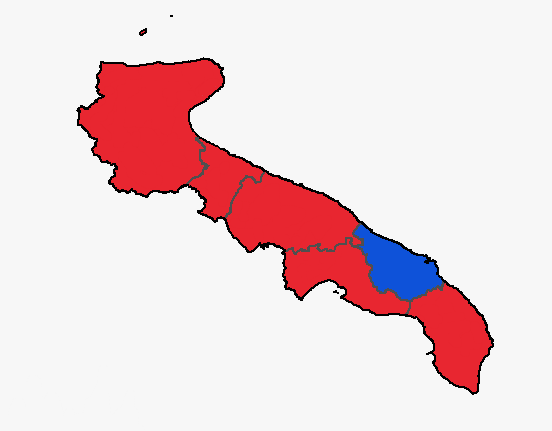
President before election
Michele Emiliano
Democratic Party
President
Michele Emiliano
Independent

The 2020 Apulian regional election took place in Apulia, Italy, on 20 and 21 September. It was originally scheduled to take place on May 31, 2020, but it was delayed due to the COVID-19 pandemic in Italy.

== Electoral system ==
The electoral law is established by the Regional Law n. 7/2015. The regional council is made up of 50 councilors, plus the president; The first 23 seats are divided at the district level and the remaining 27 at the level of the single regional constituency. The law provides for a single round, with list voting, the possibility of expressing two preferences of different gender within the chosen list, and voting for the candidate for president, on a single ballot. It is possible to vote for a slate and a candidate for the chair that are not connected to each other ("split vote").

The candidate who obtains the majority (even only relative) of the votes is elected President of the Region. The lists linked to the elected president are eventually assigned a majority bonus in the following measure: at least 29 seats if the elected president has obtained a percentage of preferences higher than 40%; at least 28 seats if the elected president has obtained a percentage of preferences between 35% and 40%, while if it falls below 35%, at least 27 councilors would be assigned. The law provides for a threshold of 8% for coalitions and lists that run on their own and 4% for lists that present themselves in a coalition.

== Background ==
On January 12, 2020, the Democratic Party (PD) held its primaries in which Governor Michele Emiliano was the winner.

Centre-left coalition Apulian governor primaries
Candidate	Votes	%
Michele Emiliano	56,773	70.42
Fabiano Amati	11,559	14.34
Elena Gentile	9,753	12.10
Leonardo Palmisano	2,532	3.14
Total	80,617	100.0

Following the primaries' victory of Emiliano, considered by Italia Viva (IV) too close to the political positions of the Five Star Movement (M5S), Matteo Renzi announced that his party would run separately from the center-left coalition. Other centrist parties like More Europe and Action welcomed Renzi's call. Action had supported the candidacy of Fabiano Amati in the PD's primaries.

After the pre-electoral agreements between the three parties of the center-right coalition, Brothers of Italy announced that the candidate in the region would be Raffaele Fitto, MEP and former governor of Apulia. However, the decision was opposed by the Salento section of the League, which instead proposed Nuccio Altieri. The final choice would be determined by the outcome of the regional elections in Emilia-Romagna and Calabria which could upset the balance between the center-right forces and therefore lead to a modification of pre-election agreements.

The M5S held the primaries on its electoral platform Rousseau. The candidates were Cristian Casili, Mario Conca, Antonella Laricchia, and Antonio Trevisi.

== Parties and candidates ==
Political party or alliance	Constituent lists	Previous result		Candidate
Political party or alliance	Constituent lists	Votes (%)	Seats	Candidate
Centre-left coalition	Democratic Party (PD)	19.8	13	Michele Emiliano
Centre-left coalition	Emiliano Mayor of Apulia	9.7	6	Michele Emiliano
Centre-left coalition	Populars with Emiliano (incl. CD, Popular Apulia and UDC dissidents)	6.2	3	Michele Emiliano
Centre-left coalition	Pensioners and Disabled	0.4	–	Michele Emiliano
Centre-left coalition	Civic Sense (incl. Art.1 and PRI)	—N/a	—N/a	Michele Emiliano
Centre-left coalition	With Emiliano	—N/a	—N/a	Michele Emiliano
Centre-left coalition	Solidary and Green Apulia (incl. SI, EV, PSI, èViva)	—N/a	—N/a	Michele Emiliano
Centre-left coalition	Italia in Comune (IiC)	—N/a	—N/a	Michele Emiliano
Centre-left coalition	Italian Animalist Party (PAI)	—N/a	—N/a	Michele Emiliano
Centre-left coalition	Party of the South (PdS)	—N/a	—N/a	Michele Emiliano
Centre-left coalition	Independent South	—N/a	—N/a	Michele Emiliano
Centre-left coalition	Christian Democracy (DC)	—N/a	—N/a	Michele Emiliano
Centre-left coalition	Alternative Left (SA)	—N/a	—N/a	Michele Emiliano
Centre-left coalition	Open Society Association – The Liberals	—N/a	—N/a	Michele Emiliano
Centre-left coalition	Thought and Action Party (PPA)	—N/a	—N/a	Michele Emiliano
Centre-right coalition	Forza Italia (FI)	11.4	5	Raffaele Fitto
Centre-right coalition	Brothers of Italy (FdI)	2.5	–	Raffaele Fitto
Centre-right coalition	League (Lega)	2.4	–	Raffaele Fitto
Centre-right coalition	Union of the Centre – New PSI (incl. LAM)	—N/a	—N/a	Raffaele Fitto
Centre-right coalition	Apulia Tomorrow – Fitto for President	—N/a	—N/a	Raffaele Fitto
M5S coalition	Five Star Movement (M5S)	17.2	7	Antonella Laricchia
M5S coalition	Future Apulia (PF)	—N/a	—N/a	Antonella Laricchia
Italia Viva coalition	Italia Viva (IV)	—N/a	—N/a	Ivan Scalfarotto
Italia Viva coalition	Scalfarotto for President – More Europe (incl. A)	—N/a	—N/a	Ivan Scalfarotto
Italia Viva coalition	Green Future (incl. Volt, PLI and ALI)	—N/a	—N/a	Ivan Scalfarotto
Work Environment Constitution (PRC – PCI – RS)		1.6 (Note: 0.9 % of the vote to The Other Apulia (PRC) + 0.7 % of the vote to PCI.)	–	Nicola Cesaria
Apulian Citizens		—N/a	—N/a	Mario Conca
Tricolour Flame (FT)		—N/a	—N/a	Pierfranco Bruni
Reconquer Italy (RI)		—N/a	—N/a	Andrea D'Agosto

== Opinion polls ==
=== Candidates ===
Date	Polling firm/ Client	Sample size	Emiliano	Fitto	Laricchia	Scalfarotto	Others	Undecided	Lead
21 Sep 2020	Opinio (exit poll)	–	39.0–43.0	39.0–43.0	11.0–15.0	1.0–3.0	–	–	Tie
4 Sep 2020	Lab2101	–	30.2	30.9	30.8	—N/a	8.2	—N/a	0.1
29 Aug–1 Sep 2020	BiDiMedia	1,325	40.2	38.9	14.3	3.9	2.7	13.3	1.3
28 Aug–1 Sep 2020	Scenari Politici–Winpoll	1,000	38.2	39.6	15.9	4.7	1.6	—N/a	1.4
28–31 Aug 2020	Ipsos	900	39.4	41.0	15.6	1.6	2.4	—N/a	1.6
28–31 Aug 2020	Quorum–YouTrend	800	39.4	40.2	15.3	3.9	1.2	—N/a	0.8
28 Aug 2020	Tecnè	2,000	36–40	39–43	14–18	2–6	1–3	—N/a	-1–7
27–29 Aug 2020	EMG	1,200	38.5	43.5	12.5	3.0	2.5	—N/a	5.0
24 Aug–2 Sep 2020	Noto	—N/a	36–40	39–43	12–16	—N/a	5–9	—N/a	-1–7
10 Aug 2020	EMG	–	37.5	43.5	12.0	5.0	2.0	—N/a	6.0
8 Aug 2020	Gpf (Note: This poll was commissioned by a political party.)	1,501	42.3	37.9	16.1	2.1	0.3	—N/a	4.4
5–6 Aug 2020	Tecnè	1,000	37.0	42.0	15.0	4.5	1.5	14.9	5.0
3–6 Aug 2020	BiDiMedia	1,353	38.8	38.1	16.7	4.2	2.2	15.5	0.7
9–14 July 2020	Lab21	–	34.5	30.2	31.1	3.1	1.1	—N/a	3.4
5–7 July 2020	Troisi Research	1000	41.1	37.6	16.7	4.2	0.4	—N/a	3.5
3 July 2020	Euromedia Research	–	39.8	37.8	17.1	3.6	1.7	—N/a	2.0
26 Jun 2020	Noto	–	38.0	45.0	11.0	4.0	2.0	—N/a	7.0
21 Jun 2020	Lab21	–	32.0–36.0	32.0–36.0	22.0–26.0	4.0–6.0	2.0–4.0	—N/a	Tie
4 Jun 2020	Noto	–	37.5	45.0	—N/a	—N/a	—N/a	—N/a	7.5
4 Jun 2020	EMG	–	36.5	43.5	—N/a	—N/a	—N/a	—N/a	7.0
19 Feb 2020	Noto	–	32.0	46.0	—N/a	—N/a	—N/a	—N/a	14.0
4–10 Feb 2020	MG Research	600	35.0–39.0	27.5–31.5	27.5–31.5	1.0–3.0 (Note: Ivan Scalfarotto wasn't the official candidate at the time the opinion poll was made)	1.0–3.0	—N/a	4.5–11.5

=== Parties ===
Date	Polling firm	Sample size	Centre-left			M5S	Centre-right				Centre	Others	Undecided	Lead
Date	Polling firm	Sample size	PD	PSV	Other	M5S	FI	Lega	FdI	Other	Centre	Others	Undecided	Lead
4 Sep 2020	Bidimedia	1325	15.3	3.8	19.8	14.2	8.5	11.1	13.7	6.2	3.9	2.9	13.9	1.1
28 Aug–1 Sep 2020	Scenari Politici–Winpoll	1,000	16.7	—N/a	18.6	17.7	7.1	15.1	14.7	4.0	4.3	1.8	—N/a	1.0
28–31 Aug 2020	Ipsos	900	18.0	—N/a	20.4	17.0	7.5	17.5	12.9	4.5	—N/a	2.2	—N/a	0.5
27–29 Aug 2020	EMG	1,200	18.0	2.0	16.0	14.5	8.0	14.0	13.0	9.0	3.0	2.5	24.3	3.5
10 Aug 2020	EMG	1,800	21.5	—N/a	13.0	13.5	10.0	15.0	14.0	6.0	4.0	2.0	—N/a	6.5
3–6 August 2020	BiDiMedia	1,353	15.0	4.0	18.7	16.4	8.4	10.5	14.1	6.1	4.1	2.7	18.5	1.4
9–14 July 2020	Lab21	–	21.3	3.2	10.2	22.7	7.6	17.4	9.3	2.3	4.1	0.6	—N/a	1.4
3 July 2020	Euromedia Research	–	20.1	2.1	16.4	19.2	8.3	18.1	8.5	2.9	3.7	0.7	39.9	2.6
29–May–1 Jun 2020	SWG	–	39.0			—N/a	43.0				—N/a	—N/a	—N/a	4.0
26-28 Feb 2020	Winpoll	–	23.0	2.6	6.6	9.6	7.9	20.4	20.2	0.2	8.3	1.2	20	2.6
19 Feb 2020	Noto	–	20.0	—N/a	—N/a	15.0	—N/a	20.0	12.0	—N/a	6.0–6.5	—N/a	—N/a	Tie
4–10 Feb 2020	MG Research	600	19.0–23.0	6.0–10.0	2.0–6.0	25.0–29.0	5.0–9.0	16.0–20.0	6.0–10.0	—N/a	2.0–6.0	1.0–5.0	—N/a	2.0–10.0

== Results ==
20–21 September 2020 Apulian regional election results
Candidates	Votes	%	Seats	Parties	Votes	%	Seats
Michele Emiliano	871,028	46.78	1	Democratic Party	289,188	17.25	16
Michele Emiliano	871,028	46.78	1	With Emiliano	110,559	6.59	6
Michele Emiliano	871,028	46.78	1	Populars with Emiliano	99,621	5.94	5
Michele Emiliano	871,028	46.78	1	Civic Sense – A New Olive Tree for Apulia	69,780	4.16	–
Michele Emiliano	871,028	46.78	1	Italia in Comune	64,886	3.87	–
Michele Emiliano	871,028	46.78	1	Solidary and Green Apulia	63,725	3.80	–
Michele Emiliano	871,028	46.78	1	Emiliano Mayor of Apulia	43,404	2.59	–
Michele Emiliano	871,028	46.78	1	Animalist Party	5,573	0.33	–
Michele Emiliano	871,028	46.78	1	Alternative Left	4,192	0.25	–
Michele Emiliano	871,028	46.78	1	Pensioners and Disabled	3,119	0.19	–
Michele Emiliano	871,028	46.78	1	Party of the South	1,410	0.08	–
Michele Emiliano	871,028	46.78	1	Thought and Action Party	1,243	0.07	–
Michele Emiliano	871,028	46.78	1	Independent South	1,179	0.07	–
Michele Emiliano	871,028	46.78	1	Christian Democracy	1,047	0.06	–
Michele Emiliano	871,028	46.78	1	Open Society Association – The Liberals	806	0.05	–
Michele Emiliano	871,028	46.78	1	Total	759,732	45.32	27
Raffaele Fitto	724,928	38.93	1	Brothers of Italy	211,693	12.63	6
Raffaele Fitto	724,928	38.93	1	League	160,507	9.57	4
Raffaele Fitto	724,928	38.93	1	Forza Italia	149,399	8.91	4
Raffaele Fitto	724,928	38.93	1	Apulia Tomorrow	141,201	8.42	3
Raffaele Fitto	724,928	38.93	1	Union of the Centre – New PSI	31,736	1.89	–
Raffaele Fitto	724,928	38.93	1	Total	694,536	41.43	17
Antonella Laricchia	207,038	11.12	–	Five Star Movement	165,243	9.86	5
Antonella Laricchia	207,038	11.12	–	Future Apulia	9,897	0.59	–
Antonella Laricchia	207,038	11.12	–	Total	175,140	10.45	5
Ivan Scalfarotto	29,808	1.60	–	Italia Viva	18,025	1.08	–
Ivan Scalfarotto	29,808	1.60	–	Scalfarotto for President	5,062	0.30	–
Ivan Scalfarotto	29,808	1.60	–	Green Future	1,888	0.11	–
Ivan Scalfarotto	29,808	1.60	–	Total	24,975	1.49	–
Mario Conca	16,531	0.89	–	Apulian Citizens	12,162	0.73	–
Nicola Cesaria	7,222	0.39	–	Work Environment Constitution	5,880	0.35	–
Pierfranco Bruni	3,115	0.17	–	Tricolour Flame	2,362	0.14	–
Andrea D'Agosto	2,353	0.13	–	Reconquer Italy	1,712	0.10	–
Blank and invalid votes	149,658	7.44					
Total candidates	1,862,023	100.00	2	Total parties	1,676,499	100.00	49
Registered voters/turnout	3,565,013	56.43					
Source: Ministry of the Interior – Results

Popular vote
PD	17.25%
FdI	12.63%
M5S	9.86%
Lega	9.57%
FI	8.91%
LPD	8.42%
CE	6.59%
Pop.	5.94%
SC	4.16%
IiC	3.87%
PSV	3.80%
ESP	2.59%
UDC–NPSI	1.89%
IV	1.08%
Others	3.44%

President
Emiliano	46.78%
Fitto	38.93%
Laricchia	11.12%
Scalfarotto	1.60%
Others	1.57%

Seats summary
Centre-left	54.90%
Centre-right	35.29%
M5S	6.81%

=== Turnout ===
Region	Time			
Region	20 Sep			21 Sep
Region	12:00	19:00	23:00	15:00
Apulia	12.04%	27.60%	39.89%	56.43%
Province	Time			
Province	20 Sep			21 Sep
Province	12:00	19:00	23:00	15:00
Bari	12.95%	29.20%	40.92%	56.88%
Barletta-Andria-Trani	12.76%	29.72%	42.61%	59.95%
Brindisi	11.53%	26.71%	38.70%	54.79%
Foggia	10.66%	25.07%	36.54%	52.76%
Lecce	12.18%	27.84%	41.05%	58.12%
Taranto	11.23%	25.67%	38.53%	55.75%
Source: Ministry of the Interior – Turnout

== See also ==
- 2020 Italian regional elections
