= 2010 Apulian regional election =

Italian regional election

- 28–29 March 2010

All 70 seats of the Regional Council 36 seats needed for a majority
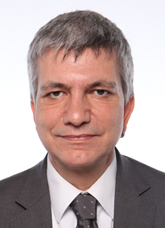

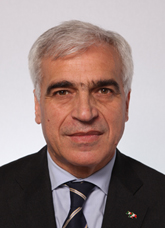
	Majority party	Minority party
Leader	Nichi Vendola	Rocco Palese
Party	Left Ecology Freedom	People of Freedom
Alliance	Centre-left	Centre-right
Last election	42 seats, 49.8%	28 seats, 49.2%
Seats won	39	27
Seat change	▼3	▼1
Popular vote	1,036,683	899,590
Percentage	48.7%	42.3%
Swing	▼1.1%	▼6.9%
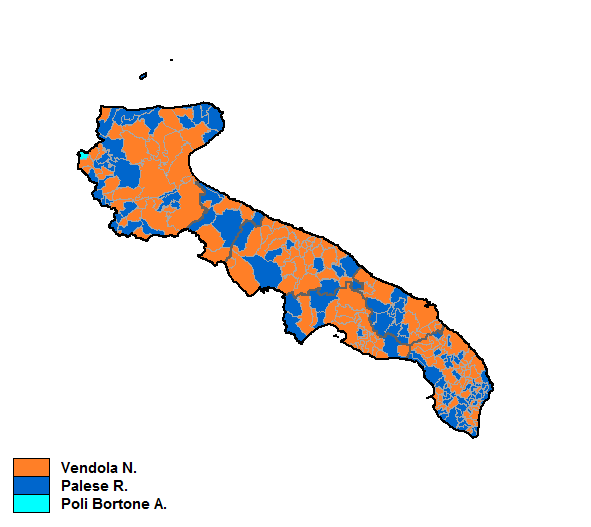
President before election
Nichi Vendola
SEL
Elected President
Nichi Vendola
SEL

The Apulian regional election of 2010 took place in Apulia, Italy, on 28–29 March 2010.

The outgoing President Nichi Vendola (SEL) was elected for a second-consecutive term, after having won a primary election in which he beat a Democrat and having benefited from the split of the centre-right, whose two candidates jointly won 51.0% of the vote.

Vendola's party, SEL, had a strong showing in the Region by coming third with 9.7% of the vote, after The People of Freedom (31.1%) and the Democratic Party (20.8%).

== Background ==
The incumbent left-wing president Nichi Vendola, who in 2005 surprisingly defeated a centrist in the centre-left primary election and then the outgoing President Raffaele Fitto, was under attack by his own coalition. Vendola, a gay communist President in a fairly conservative region, would have found hard to get re-election in a time when the centre-right led by Silvio Berlusconi was ahead of the centre-left both in Apulia and the whole country. Moreover Vendola, after having left the Communist Refoundation Party in early 2009, instead of joining the Democratic Party (PD), the largest party of the centre-left, started a small outfit named Left and Freedom and launched his bid.

The Democrats acknowledge that they needed a larger coalition in order to beat the centre-right and they were thus trying to convince Vendola to give up his bid and to endorse a more centrist candidate that could obtain the support of the Union of Christian and Centre Democrats (UDC) and Adriana Poli Bortone's I the South movement. Michele Emiliano, Mayor of Bari and PD regional leader, had been constantly mentioned as a possible candidate who would have received the support of the UDC. For her part Poli Bortone might have been interested in the race but her right-wing upbringing (she was a member of the Italian Social Movement and of National Alliance) would undoubtedly have stirred the left.

In a succession of events between late December 2009 and January 2010, Emiliano turned against Vendola (whom he supported until then), asked his party's regional assembly to unanimously endorse himself. The assembly of the party was suspended because of clashes between Emiliano and Vendola supporters, then Emiliano accepted to contest a primary election with Vendola and finally withdrew from the race, leaving the PD without a strong candidate.

Finally Vendola was chosen as candidate of the centre-left in a primary election on 25 January 2010.

The People of Freedom (PdL) of Berlusconi and former President Raffaele Fitto subsequently chose Rocco Palese, leader of Forza Italia–PdL group in the Regional Council and former Vice President of Fitto, while the UDC launched Poli Bortone.

== Centre-left primary election ==
After that Emiliano renounced his bid, the PD proposed Francesco Boccia as its candidate and the UDC endorsed him. However, as Vendola did not intend to withdraw from the race, the PD accepted to run a coalition primary election between Vendola and Boccia. This was a re-edition of the 2005 primary election, in which Boccia was narrowly defeated by Vendola.

On 25 January 2010 an unprecedented number of Apulian citizens turned out to vote in the primary and Vendola trounced Boccia in the primary, by winning over 67% of the votes cast.

Candidate	Party	Votes	%
Nichi Vendola	SEL	137,521	67.2
Francesco Boccia	PD	66,991	32.8
Total		204,512	100.0
Source: Nichi Vendola website

== Results ==
The elected Regional Council by coalition: Centre-left (39) Centre-right (27) Centrists (4)

28–29 March 2010 Apulian regional election results
Candidates	Votes	%	Seats	Parties	Votes	%	Seats
Nichi Vendola	1,036,638	48.69	1				
Nichi Vendola	1,036,638	48.69	1	Democratic Party	410,395	20.75	19
Nichi Vendola	1,036,638	48.69	1	Left Ecology Freedom (incl. PSI)	192,604	9.74	9
Nichi Vendola	1,036,638	48.69	1	Italy of Values	127,865	6.47	5
Nichi Vendola	1,036,638	48.69	1	Apulia for Vendola	109,382	5.53	5
Nichi Vendola	1,036,638	48.69	1	Federation of the Left – Greens	64,441	3.26	–
Nichi Vendola	1,036,638	48.69	1	Bonino-Pannella List	6,005	0.30	–
Nichi Vendola	1,036,638	48.69	1	Total	910,692	46.05	38
Rocco Palese	899,590	42.25	1				
Rocco Palese	899,590	42.25	1	The People of Freedom	615,064	31.10	20
Rocco Palese	899,590	42.25	1	Apulia First of All	139,379	7.05	4
Rocco Palese	899,590	42.25	1	Apulians for Rocco Palese	95,070	4.81	2
Rocco Palese	899,590	42.25	1	Alliance of the Centre	11,047	0.56	–
Rocco Palese	899,590	42.25	1	Union of Democrats for Europe	9,125	0.46	–
Rocco Palese	899,590	42.25	1	Pensioners' Party	4,777	0.24	–
Rocco Palese	899,590	42.25	1	Total	874,462	44.22	26
Adriana Poli Bortone	185,370	8.71	–				
Adriana Poli Bortone	185,370	8.71	–	Union of the Centre	128,542	6.50	4
Adriana Poli Bortone	185,370	8.71	–	I the South – MPA	57,901	2.93	–
Adriana Poli Bortone	185,370	8.71	–	Total	186,443	9.43	4
Michele Rizzi	7,376	0.35	–	Communist Alternative Party	5,834	0.30	–
Total candidates	2,128,974	100.00	2	Total parties	1,977,431	100.00	68
Source: Ministry of the Interior
