= 2005 Apulian regional election =

Italian regional election

- 3–4 April 2005

All 70 seats to the Regional Council of Apulia
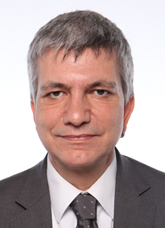

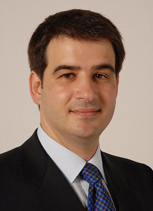
	Majority party	Minority party
Leader	Nichi Vendola	Raffaele Fitto
Party	PRC	Forza Italia
Alliance	The Union	House of Freedoms
Last election	22 seats, 43.5%	38 seats, 54.0%
Seats won	42	28
Seat change	▲20	▼10
Popular vote	1,165,536	1,151,405
Percentage	49.8%	49.2%
Swing	▲6.3%	▼5.8%
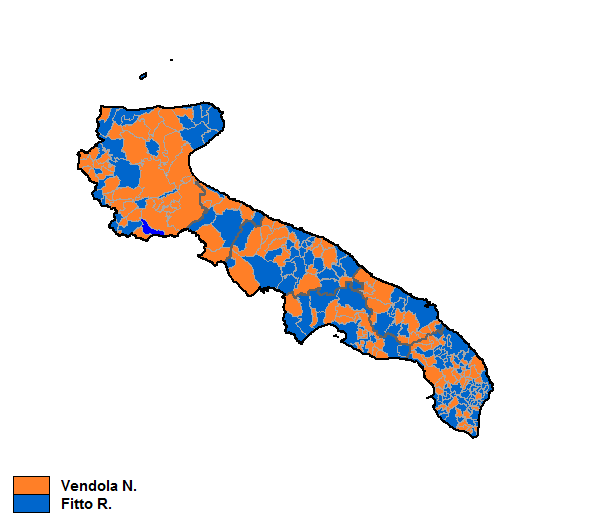
President before election
Raffaele Fitto
FI
Elected President
Nichi Vendola
PRC

The Apulian regional election of 2005 took place on 3–4 April 2005.

Nichi Vendola (Communist Refoundation Party) defeated incumbent Raffaele Fitto (Forza Italia). The success of Vendola came somewhat unexpected. In a Southern Italian Region, expected to be morally conservative, Vendola, a communist and homosexual, defeated Fitto, a conservative Christian democrat. Vendola was the first candidate ever to be appointed by its coalition through a primary election instead of agreements between parties. A defeat of Vendola might have resulted in a cancellation of the primary election of The Union for choosing the candidate for Prime Minister in the 2006 general election.

== Centre-left primary election ==
The centre-left candidate was chosen through primary elections, which were won by surprise by Nichi Vendola.

Candidate	Party	Votes	%
Nichi Vendola	PRC	40,358	50.9
Francesco Boccia	DL	38,676	49.1
Total		79,034	100.0

== Results ==
3–4 April 2005 Apulian regional election results
Candidates	Votes	%	Seats	Parties	Votes	%	Seats
Nichi Vendola	1,165,536	49.84	1				
Nichi Vendola	1,165,536	49.84	1	Democrats of the Left	356,369	16.63	14
Nichi Vendola	1,165,536	49.84	1	Democracy is Freedom – The Daisy	208,806	9.74	8
Nichi Vendola	1,165,536	49.84	1	Communist Refoundation Party	109,146	5.09	4
Nichi Vendola	1,165,536	49.84	1	Italian Democratic Socialists	86,096	4.01	3
Nichi Vendola	1,165,536	49.84	1	Union of Democrats for Europe	70,293	3.28	3
Nichi Vendola	1,165,536	49.84	1	The Apulian Spring	55,335	2.58	3
Nichi Vendola	1,165,536	49.84	1	Party of Italian Communists	48,141	2.24	2
Nichi Vendola	1,165,536	49.84	1	Autonomist Socialists – PSDI – MRE	47,511	2.22	2
Nichi Vendola	1,165,536	49.84	1	Italy of Values	38,120	1.78	1
Nichi Vendola	1,165,536	49.84	1	Federation of the Greens	33,309	1.55	1
Nichi Vendola	1,165,536	49.84	1	United Democratic Christians	8,397	0.39	–
Nichi Vendola	1,165,536	49.84	1	Pensioners' Party	3,959	0.18	–
Nichi Vendola	1,165,536	49.84	1	Total	1,065,752	49.69	41
Raffaele Fitto	1,151,405	49.24	1				
Raffaele Fitto	1,151,405	49.24	1	Forza Italia	381,663	17.80	10
Raffaele Fitto	1,151,405	49.24	1	National Alliance	259,563	12.10	7
Raffaele Fitto	1,151,405	49.24	1	Apulia First of All	196,281	9.15	5
Raffaele Fitto	1,151,405	49.24	1	Union of Christian and Centre Democrats	167,038	7.79	4
Raffaele Fitto	1,151,405	49.24	1	New PSI – PRI	48,109	2.24	1
Raffaele Fitto	1,151,405	49.24	1	Social Idea Movement	10,099	0.47	–
Raffaele Fitto	1,151,405	49.24	1	Total	1.062.753	49.55	27
Gianfelice Galassi	10,973	0.47	–	Social Alternative	9,368	0.44	–
Luca Scalabrini	10,477	0.45	–	Christian Democracy	6,791	0.32	–
Total candidates	2,338,391	100.00	2	Total parties	2,144,664	100.00	68
Source: Ministry of the Interior – Historical Archive of Elections
