= Raffaele Fitto =

Italian politician (born 1969)

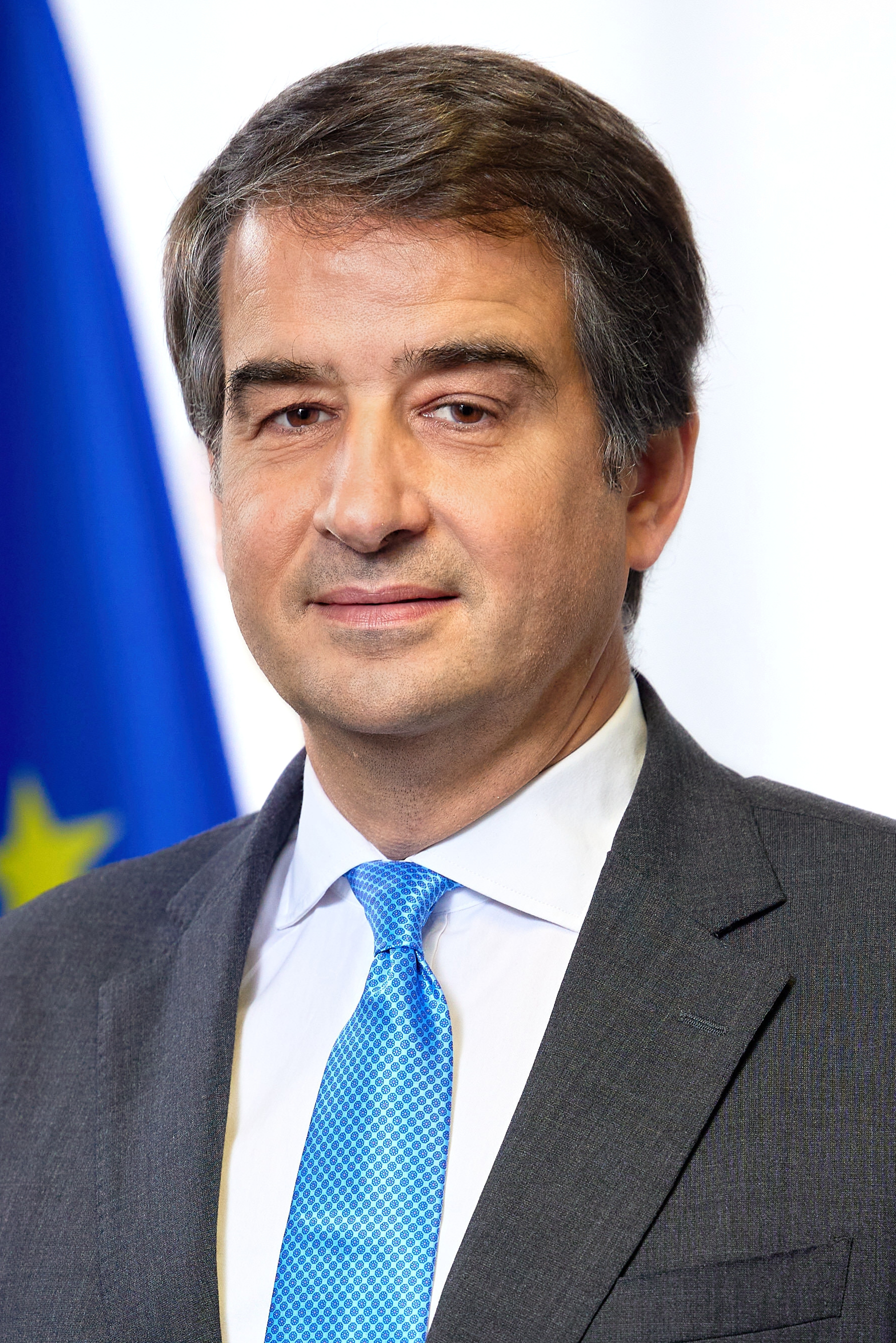
- Official portrait, 2024

Executive Vice-President of the European Commission
- Incumbent
- Assumed office 1 December 2024
- Commission: Von der Leyen II

European Commissioner for Cohesion Policy, Regional Development and Cities
- Incumbent
- Assumed office 1 December 2024
- Commission: Von der Leyen II
- Preceded by: Elisa Ferreira

Minister for European Affairs, the South and Cohesion Policies and the NRRP
- In office 22 October 2022 – 30 November 2024
- Prime Minister: Giorgia Meloni
- Preceded by: Vincenzo Amendola (European Affairs, 2021); Mara Carfagna (South and Cohesion)
- Succeeded by: Tommaso Foti

Co-Chair of the European Conservatives and Reformists
- In office 2 July 2019 – 12 October 2022
- Served alongside: Ryszard Legutko; Jorge Buxadé

Member of the European Parliament for Southern Italy
- In office 1 July 2014 – 12 October 2022
- In office 20 July 1999 – 20 June 2000

Member of the Chamber of Deputies
- In office 13 October 2022 – 30 November 2024
- Constituency: Apulia
- In office 28 April 2006 – 25 June 2014
- Constituency: Apulia

Minister for Regional Affairs and Territorial Cohesion
- In office 8 May 2008 – 16 November 2011
- Prime Minister: Silvio Berlusconi
- Preceded by: Linda Lanzillotta
- Succeeded by: Piero Gnudi (Regional Affairs); Fabrizio Barca (Territorial Cohesion)

President of Apulia
- In office 19 May 2000 – 27 April 2005
- Preceded by: Salvatore Distaso
- Succeeded by: Nichi Vendola

Personal details
- Born: 28 August 1969 (age 57) Maglie, Italy
- Party: FdI (since 2019)
- Other political affiliations: DC (1990–1994); PPI (1994–1995); CDU (1995–1998); CDL (1998–2001); FI (2001–2009); PdL (2009–2013); FI (2013–2015); CoR (2015–2017); DI (2017–2019)
- Spouse: Adriana Panzera
- Children: 3
- Education: University of Bari
- Website: raffaelefitto.it

Raffaele Fitto (Italian pronunciation: [raffaˈɛːle ˈfitto]; born 28 August 1969) is an Italian politician who has served as Executive Vice-President of the European Commission for Cohesion and Reforms since 2024. He previously was Minister for European Affairs and Minister for the South and Cohesion Policies in the government of Prime Minister Giorgia Meloni from 2022 to 2024. A member of Brothers of Italy (FdI), which he joined in 2019, he also served as President of Apulia from 2000 to 2005 and Minister for Regional Affairs and Territorial Cohesion from 2008 to 2011 in Prime Minister Silvio Berlusconi's fourth government.

== Career ==
Born in Maglie, Apulia, Fitto began his political career during the 1990s in Christian Democracy (DC), the ruling party of post-war Italy. When the DC was dissolved and with the birth of the Second Italian Republic, he joined the DC's successor political parties and Christian democratic parties, such as Italian People's Party (PPI), the United Christian Democrats (CDU), and the Christian Democrats for Freedom (CDL).

In 1999, he was elected to the European Parliament on the electoral list of Forza Italia (FI), of which he was a member from 2001 to 2009, when he joined The People of Freedom (PdL), the new party of Silvio Berlusconi. On 17 May 2015, Fitto left the new Forza Italia, which he had joined when it was re-founded in 2013, and the European People's Party Group to join the European Conservatives and Reformists. From 2015 to 2017, Fitto was a member of Conservatives and Reformists (CoR). In 2017, he joined Direction Italy (DI), which he left in 2019 to join the Brothers of Italy party led by Giorgia Meloni. In 2022, he was appointed to Giorgia Meloni's government. He was replaced in the European Parliament by Denis Nesci.

In July 2026 the European Commission has designated Raffaele Fitto as Commission's Special Representative for Cyprus.

== Trials ==
=== Bribery towards the Italian public health care system ===
In 2006, Fitto was investigated by the Bari prosecutor in connection with a donation to his regional party La Puglia Prima di Tutto of €500,000 by Tosinvest, a company owned by Antonio Angelucci, ahead of the 2005 Apulian regional election. According to the prosecution, this amount was suspected of being a bribe to secure for the Apulia region the management of eleven nursing homes. A request to arrest Fitto, who in the meantime had become a member of the Italian Parliament, was rejected by the Chamber of Deputies. In December 2009, he was found guilty of abuse of office, corruption, and illegal financing of political parties; Fitto was acquitted of some other charges in June 2012.

In February 2013, Fitto was sentenced by the Court of first instance (Tribunale di Primo Grado) to four years in prison and five years' disqualification from public office; the sentence was commuted to 1 year. In September 2015, Fitto was acquitted of all charges by the Court of second instance (Corte d'Appello). In June 2017, he was acquitted of all charges by the Supreme Court of Cassation (Corte di Cassazione).

=== Bankruptcy of Cedis ===
In February 2009, Fitto was accused of conspiring, during his time as president of Apulia (2000–2005) to short-sell the trading company Cedis at that time (2004–2006) in administration. The charges were filed in April 2009. In March 2017, Fitto was acquitted of all charges by the Court of second instance.

== Electoral history ==
Election	House	Constituency	Party	Votes	Result	Notes
1990	Regional Council of Apulia	Lecce	DC	75,355	Elected	
1995	Regional Council of Apulia	Lecce	CDU	22,606	Elected	
1999	European Parliament	Southern Italy	FI	128,637	Elected	
2006	Chamber of Deputies	Apulia	FI	– (Note: Elected in a closed list proportional representation system.)	Elected	
2008	Chamber of Deputies	Apulia	PdL	–	Elected	
2013	Chamber of Deputies	Apulia	PdL	–	Elected	
2014	European Parliament	Southern Italy	FI	284,712	Elected	
2019	European Parliament	Southern Italy	FdI	87,786	Elected	
2022	Chamber of Deputies	Apulia	FdI	–	Elected	
