= 1980 Apulian regional election =

Italian regional election

The Apulian regional election of 1980 took place on 8 June 1980.

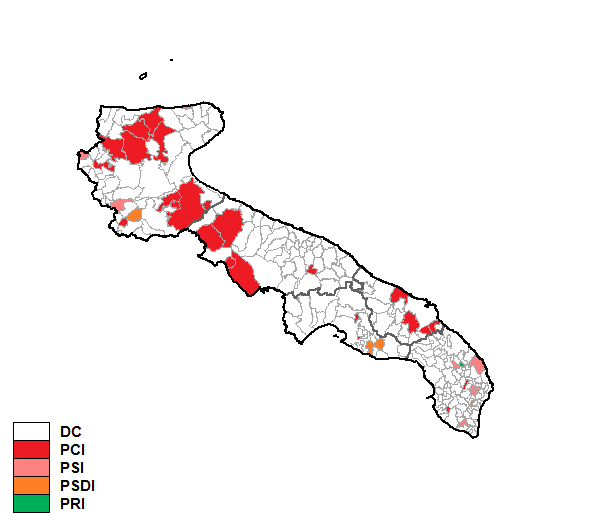
Largest party by municipality

== Events ==
Christian Democracy was by far the largest party, while the Italian Communist Party came distantly second. After the election Nicola Quarta, the incumbent Christian Democratic President, formed a new centre-left government (Organic Centre-left). In 1983 Quarta was replaced by Gennaro Trisorio Liuzzi, a Christian Democrat who had already served as President of the Region from 1970 to 1975.

== Results ==
Parties	votes	votes (%)	seats
Christian Democracy	924,502	42.1	22
Italian Communist Party	540,058	24.6	13
Italian Socialist Party	291,609	13.3	6
Italian Social Movement	204,240	9.3	5
Italian Democratic Socialist Party	114,570	5.2	2
Italian Republican Party	54,545	2.5	1
Italian Liberal Party	35,590	1.6	1
Proletarian Unity Party	28,698	1.3	1
Apulian Radical List	1,868	0.1	-
Revolutionary Communist League	529	0.0	-
Total	2,125,780	100.0	50

Source: Ministry of the Interior
