= 1970 Apulian regional election =

Italian regional election

The Apulian regional election of 1970 took place on 7–8 June 1970.

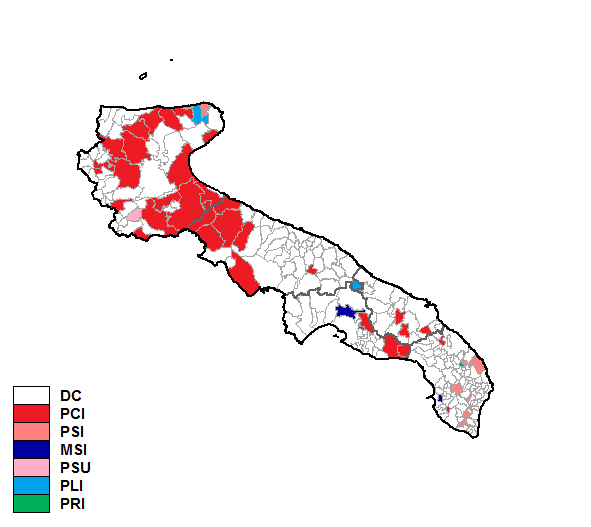
Largest party by municipality

== Events ==
Christian Democracy was by far the largest party, while the Italian Communist Party came distantly second. After the election Christian Democrat Gennaro Trisorio Liuzzi was elected President of the Region at the head of a centre-left coalition (Organic Centre-left).

== Results ==
Parties	votes	votes (%)	seats
Christian Democracy	766,254	41.3	22
Italian Communist Party	488,709	26.3	14
Italian Socialist Party	197,519	10.6	5
Italian Social Movement	162,136	8.7	4
Unitary Socialist Party	76,116	4.1	2
Italian Liberal Party	56,140	3.0	1
Italian Socialist Party of Proletarian Unity	44,998	2.4	1
Italian Republican Party	43,506	2.3	1
Italian Democratic Party of Monarchist Unity	18,009	1.0	-
Independent	2,047	0.1	-
National Democratic Party	997	0.0	-
Total	1,856,431	100.0	50

Source: Ministry of the Interior
