= 1985 Apulian regional election =

Election in Italy

The Apulian regional election of 1985 took place on 12 May 1985.

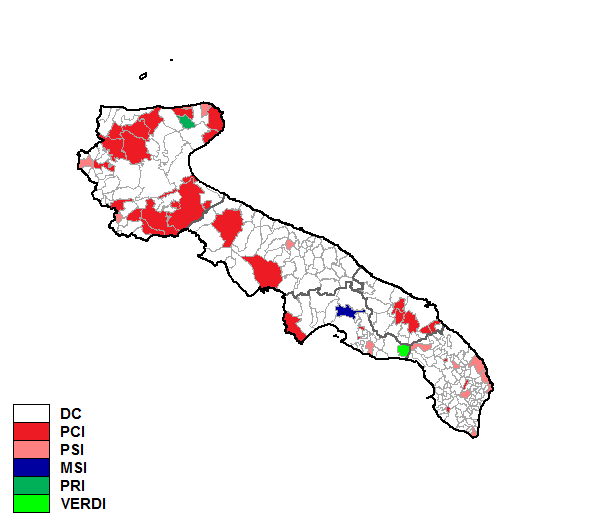
Largest party by municipality

== Events ==
Christian Democracy was by far the largest party, while the Italian Communist Party came distantly second. After the election Christian Democrat Salvatore Fitto was elected President of the Region at the head of a centre-left coalition (Organic Centre-left).

In 1988, after the sudden death in a car accident of Fitto, the post of President of the Region was given to Giuseppe Colasanto, a Christian Democrat too.

== Results ==
Parties	votes	votes (%)	seats
Christian Democracy	912,923	38.4	20
Italian Communist Party	580,805	24.4	13
Italian Socialist Party	357,733	15.0	8
Italian Social Movement	244,474	10.3	5
Italian Democratic Socialist Party	104,858	4.4	2
Italian Republican Party	77,019	3.2	1
Italian Liberal Party	41,627	1.8	1
Green List	25,151	1.1	-
Proletarian Democracy	19,011	0.8	-
Pensioners Italian Alliance – Venetian League	6,527	0.3	-
Valdostan Union – Democratic Party – others	5,304	0.2	-
Pensioners' National Party	1,540	0.1	-
Pensioners' National Party – Civic list	1,141	0.1	-
Total	2,378,113	100.0	50

Source: Ministry of the Interior
