= 1995 Apulian regional election =

Regional election in Apulia, Italy

- April 23, 1995

All 63 seats to the Regional Council of Apulia

	Majority party	Minority party
Leader	Salvatore Distaso	Luigi Ferrara Mirenzi
Party	Independent	PDS
Alliance	Centre-right	Centre-left
Seats won	28	25
Popular vote	1,071,186	986,782
Percentage	49.8%	45.9%
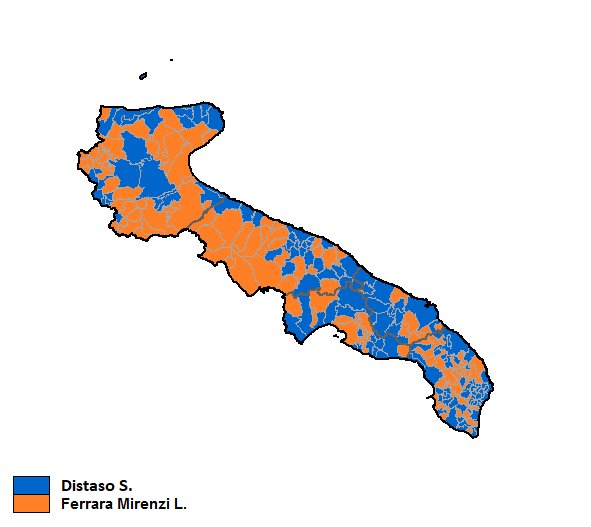
President before election
Giuseppe Martellotta
PPI
Elected President
Salvatore Distaso
Ind.

The Apulian regional election of 1995 took place on 23 April 1995.

For the first time the President of the Region was directly elected by the people, although the election was not yet binding and the President-elect could have been replaced during the term.

Salvatore Distaso (the candidate of the centre-right coalition) was elected President of the Region, defeating Luigi Ferrara Mirenzi (Italian People's Party) by a slim margin.

== Results ==
23 April 1995 Apulian regional election results
Candidates	Votes	%	Seats	Parties	Votes	%	Seats
Salvatore Distaso	1,071,186	49.79	12				
Salvatore Distaso	1,071,186	49.79	12	Forza Italia – The People's Pole	404,417	20.71	11
Salvatore Distaso	1,071,186	49.79	12	National Alliance	398,597	20.41	12
Salvatore Distaso	1,071,186	49.79	12	Christian Democratic Centre	109,888	5.63	3
Salvatore Distaso	1,071,186	49.79	12	Environment Club	15,057	0.77	–
Salvatore Distaso	1,071,186	49.79	12	Total	927,959	47.52	26
Luigi Ferrara Mirenzi	986,782	45.86	–				
Luigi Ferrara Mirenzi	986,782	45.86	–	Democratic Party of the Left	432,171	22.13	12
Luigi Ferrara Mirenzi	986,782	45.86	–	Communist Refoundation Party	158,446	8.11	4
Luigi Ferrara Mirenzi	986,782	45.86	–	Populars	152,284	7.80	4
Luigi Ferrara Mirenzi	986,782	45.86	–	Pact of Democrats	112,776	5.77	3
Luigi Ferrara Mirenzi	986,782	45.86	–	Federation of the Greens	51,607	2.64	1
Luigi Ferrara Mirenzi	986,782	45.86	–	Labour Federation–PSDI–PRI	42,494	2.18	–
Luigi Ferrara Mirenzi	986,782	45.86	–	Federal Italy League	6,841	0.35	–
Luigi Ferrara Mirenzi	986,782	45.86	–	Total	956,619	48.99	25
Anselmo Ciuffoletti	46,896	2.18	–				
Anselmo Ciuffoletti	46,896	2.18	–	Southern Action League – MNP	28,613	1.47	–
Anselmo Ciuffoletti	46,896	2.18	–	Tricolour Flame	10,879	0.56	–
Anselmo Ciuffoletti	46,896	2.18	–	Total	39,492	2.02	25
Marco Pannella	46,720	2.17	–	Pannella List	28,790	1.47	–
Total candidates	2,151,584	100.00	12	Total parties	1,952,860	100.00	51
Source: Ministry of the Interior – Historical Archive of Elections
