= 1990 Apulian regional election =

Italian regional election

The Apulian regional election of 1990 took place on 6 and 7 May 1990.

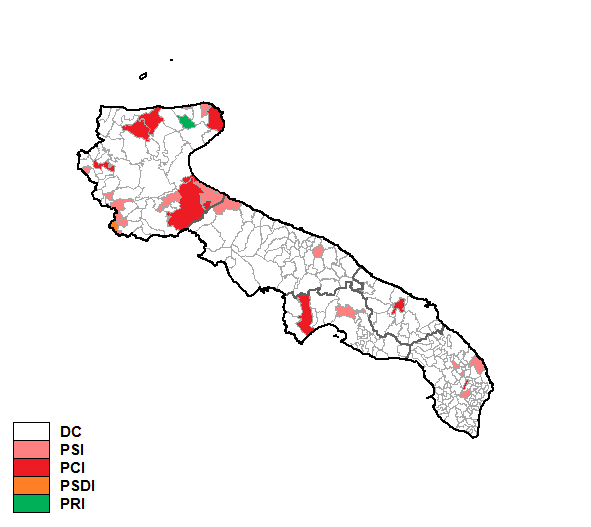
Largest party by municipality

== Events ==
Christian Democracy was by far the largest party, largely ahead of its major competitors, the Italian Communist Party, which had its worst result ever in a regional election, and the Italian Socialist Party, that gained its best result ever and even surpassed the Communists.

After the election Christian Democrat Michele Bellomo was elected President of the Region at the head of a centre-left coalition (Organic Centre-left). After the Tangentopoli scandals, Bellomo was replaced by a succession of short-lived governments.

== Results ==
Parties	votes	votes (%)	seats
Christian Democracy	978,734	40.7	22
Italian Socialist Party	474,404	19.7	10
Italian Communist Party	449,969	18.7	10
Italian Social Movement	149,707	6.2	3
Italian Democratic Socialist Party	104,055	4.3	2
Italian Republican Party	71,554	3.0	1
Green List	53,232	2.2	1
Italian Liberal Party	52,871	2.2	1
Rainbow Greens	27,253	1.1	-
Proletarian Democracy	19,032	0.8	-
Antiprohibitionists on Drugs	17,989	0.8	-
Southern League Apulia	6,072	0.3	-
Total	2,404,872	100.0	50

Source: Ministry of the Interior
