= Bernardo Lodispoto =

Italian politician (born 1951)

President of the Province of Barletta-Andria-Trani
- Incumbent
- Assumed office 27 September 2019
- Preceded by: Nicola Giorgino

Mayor of Margherita di Savoia
- Incumbent
- Assumed office 11 June 2018
- Preceded by: Paolo Marrano
- In office 14 September 1987 – 18 July 1990
- Succeeded by: Salvatore Bufo

Personal details
- Born: 11 May 1951 (age 75) Margherita di Savoia, Province of Foggia, Italy
- Party: Italian Socialist Party; Democratic Party of the Left; New Italian Socialist Party; Italian Socialist Party

Bernardo Lodispoto (born 11 May 1951) is an Italian politician serving as president of the Province of Barletta-Andria-Trani since 2019. He has served as mayor of Margherita di Savoia since 2018.

== Life and career ==
Lodispoto was born in Margherita di Savoia in 1951. He entered politics as a member of the Italian Socialist Party and was elected to the municipal council of his hometown in the 1980s, serving as mayor from 1987 to 1990. In 1994, he was elected to the Provincial Council of Foggia. He later joined the Democratic Party of the Left and served as a provincial assessor in Foggia.

Lodispoto subsequently joined the New Italian Socialist Party and then the Italian Socialist Party. In 2009, he was elected as a member of the first Provincial Council of Barletta-Andria-Trani. In 2018, he was elected mayor of Margherita di Savoia again.

In September 2019, Lodispoto was elected president of the Province of Barletta-Andria-Trani as the candidate of the centre-left coalition, defeating centre-right candidate Francesco Di Feo, and Cosimo Cannito, who ran with a civic list. In December 2023, he was re-elected with 48,653 weighted votes (50.42%), defeating Michele Patruno, mayor of Spinazzola.

In January 2026, Lodispoto became the subject of a corruption investigation by the Public Prosecutor's Office of Trani concerning an alleged bribery case involving public contracts. By that time, the provincial leadership of the Democratic Party had distanced itself from him. Brothers of Italy MEP and provincial coordinator Francesco Ventola called for Lodispoto's resignation, citing also what he described as a loss of confidence among mayors and provincial councillors. The following month, eleven of the twelve members of the provincial council resigned in protest against his presidency. Lodispoto stated that he would not resign, noting that new council elections had already been scheduled for April 2026.
