= Luigi Spezzotti =

Italian politician and businessman (1876–1964)

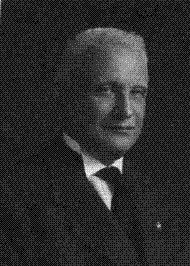

Senator of the Kingdom of Italy
- In office 24 January 1929 – 1945

Member of the Chamber of Deputies
- In office 1924–1929

Undersecretary of State for the Ministry of Finance
- In office 3 July 1924 – 14 July 1925

Mayor of Udine
- In office 1920–1923
- Preceded by: Domenico Pecile
- Succeeded by: Luigi Russo (podestà)

President of the Province of Udine
- In office 1912–1917
- Preceded by: Damiano Roviglio

Personal details
- Born: 7 July 1876 Udine, Kingdom of Italy
- Died: 28 April 1964 (aged 87) Udine, Italy
- Party: National Fascist Party
- Occupation: Businessman, public official

Luigi Spezzotti (7 July 1876 – 28 April 1964) was an Italian businessman and politician who served as undersecretary of State for Finance from 1924 to 1925, and as a member of the Chamber of Deputies and later the Senate of the Kingdom of Italy.

In 1912 he became president of the Province of Udine, a position in which he promoted infrastructure projects in Friuli. In 1917, Spezzotti was appointed Udine's government commissioner, with headquarters in Florence. He served as mayor of Udine from 1920 to 1923, continuing to administer the municipality until 1926 as a prefectural commissioner.
