= Francesco Spina =

Italian politician (born 1967)

President of the Province of Barletta-Andria-Trani
- In office 14 October 2014 – 29 February 2016
- Preceded by: Francesco Ventola
- Succeeded by: Nicola Giorgino

Mayor of Bisceglie
- In office 30 May 2006 – 6 September 2017
- Preceded by: Francesco Napoletano
- Succeeded by: Vittorio Fata

Personal details
- Born: Francesco Carlo Spina; 4 March 1967 (age 59) Bisceglie, Province of Bari, Italy
- Party: Action (since 2023)

Francesco Carlo Spina (born 4 March 1967) is an Italian politician who served as president of the Province of Barletta-Andria-Trani from 2014 to 2016 and mayor of Bisceglie from 2006 to 2017.

== Life and career ==
Born in Bisceglie, Spina entered local politics in 2002, when he was elected to the municipal council of his hometown. In 2006, he was elected mayor of Bisceglie as the candidate of the centre-right coalition. He was re-elected in 2011 and again in 2013.

In October 2014, Spina was elected president of the Province of Barletta-Andria-Trani as the centre-right candidate, defeating Pasquale Cascella, mayor of Barletta, with 58.9% of the weighted votes.

Spina subsequently moved closer to the centre-left led in Apulia by Michele Emiliano, becoming provincial coordinator of the regional civic lists supporting Emiliano. In February 2016, he joined the Democratic Party (PD). After pressure from the party over the fact that he had originally been elected provincial president with centre-right support, Spina resigned from office. The following year, he supported Emiliano in the 2017 PD leadership election.

In the 2018 Italian general election, Spina ran for the Chamber of Deputies in a single-member constituency for the PD but was not elected. Ahead of the 2023 municipal elections in Bisceglie, he left the PD and ran again for mayor with the support of Lega and Brothers of Italy, but was unsuccessful. In the summer of 2023, he joined Action and was appointed its provincial coordinator. In March 2025, he became a member of Action's national board.

Spina's political career has been described as an example of contemporary political trasformismo.
