= Onofrio Jannuzzi =

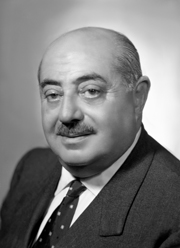

Senator of the Republic of Italy
- In office 8 May 1948 – 19 May 1969
- Constituency: Molfetta

Mayor of Andria
- In office 1952–1956
- Preceded by: Vincenzo Mucci
- Succeeded by: Giuseppe Marano
- In office 1967–1967
- Preceded by: Riccardo Di Corato
- Succeeded by: Francesco Fuzio

Undersecretary of State for Defence
- In office 27 July 1951 – 17 July 1953

Personal details
- Born: 1 November 1902 Andria, Province of Bari, Kingdom of Italy
- Died: 19 May 1969 (aged 66) Rome, Italy
- Party: Christian Democracy
- Education: Sapienza University of Rome
- Profession: Lawyer

Onofrio Jannuzzi (1 November 1902 – 19 May 1969) was an Italian lawyer and politician of the Christian Democracy party. He served as prefectural commissioner of Andria between 1944 and 1945 and was elected to the Italian Senate in 1948, retaining his seat through five consecutive legislatures until his death in 1969. Jannuzzi served as Undersecretary of State for Defence in the De Gasperi VII Cabinet from 1951 to 1953. He was also mayor of Andria from 1952 to 1956 and again briefly in 1967.

He also served as a substitute member (1954–1959) and representative (1959–1969) of the Parliamentary Assembly of the Council of Europe.

== Sources ==
- "On. Onofrio Jannuzzi". Senato della Repubblica.
- "143a seduta pubblica. Resoconto stenografico mercoledì 28 maggio 1969" (PDF). Senato della Repubblica.
