= Federico Rossi =

Federico Rossi may refer to:

- Federico Rossi (engineer), Italian engineer, professor and politician
- Federico Rossi (singer), Italian singer
