= Furio Honsell =

Italian mathematician and mayor

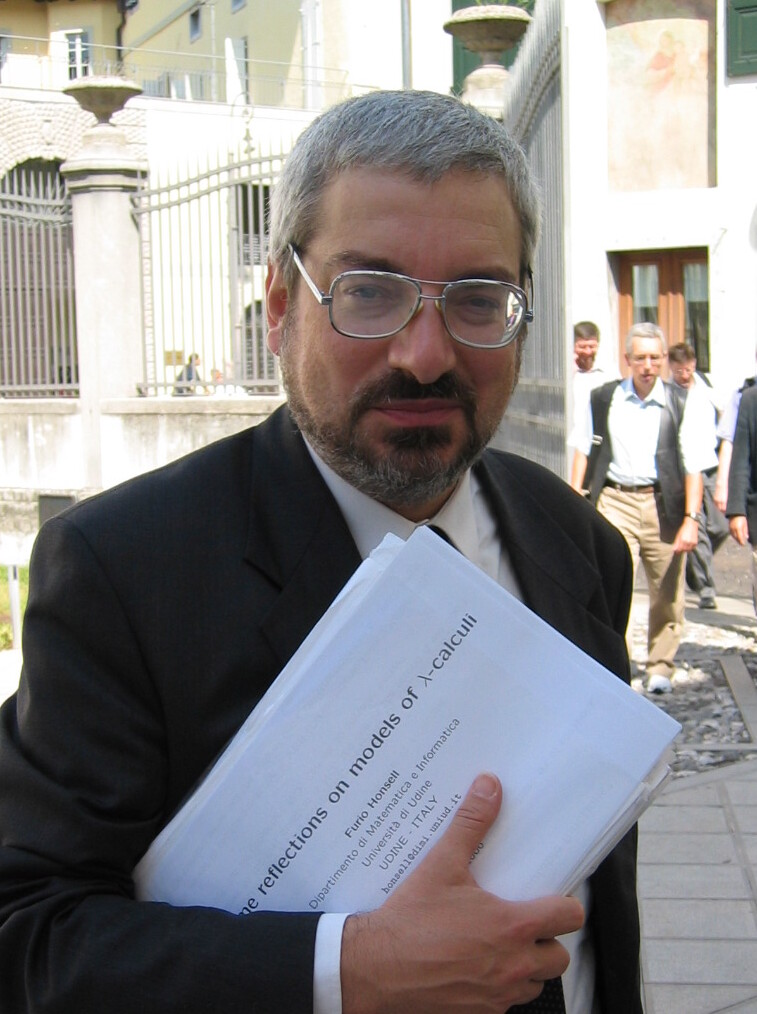
- Honsell in 2006

Mayor of Udine
- In office 28 April 2008 – 18 January 2018
- Preceded by: Sergio Cecotti
- Succeeded by: Pietro Fontanini

Rector of the University of Udine
- In office 21 June 2001 – 4 April 2008
- Preceded by: Marzio Strassoldo
- Succeeded by: Cristiana Compagno

Personal details
- Born: 20 August 1958 (age 68) Genoa, Italy
- Party: PD (2008-2018); Art1 (2018-2023)
- Education: University of Pisa
- Profession: University professor, mathematician

Furio Honsell (born 20 August 1958) is an Italian professor and mathematician. He was the mayor of Udine from 2008 to 2018.

== Biography ==
Honsell received a mathematics degree at the University of Pisa in 1980, with a subsequent diploma in mathematics at the Normale of Pisa in 1983.

=== Academic career ===
Honsell has held research and tenured positions at the computer science department of the University of Turin, the University of Edinburgh and the University of Udine. His research concerned, among other subjects, lambda calculus and language semantics.

In 1990 he was appointed full professor of computer science at the University of Udine, where he directed the computing center until 1992, the department of mathematics and computer science from 1992 to 1995, and was Dean of the faculty of mathematical, physical and natural sciences from 1995 to 1998. In 2001, Honsell was elected Rector of the University of Udine, an office he held until 2008, when he ran for the position of Mayor of Udine.

=== Political career ===
==== Mayor of Udine ====
In the local elections of 2008, Honsell was elected Mayor of Udine for the centre-left coalition, endorsed by the Democratic Party, The Left – The Rainbow and the Italy of Values. He was re-elected in 2013, endorsed by the Democratic Party, Left Ecology Freedom and the Federation of the Left.

==== Regional councillor ====
On 18 January 2018, Honsell resigned as mayor in order to stand as a candidate in the regional elections in Friuli-Venezia Giulia the following spring with Open - Sinistra FVG, a list supported by Article One, in support of the centre-left presidential candidate Sergio Bolzonello. Honsell was elected to the regional council and later re-elected in the following regional election.

He was a candidate in the 2019 European elections with the Democratic Party list as an independent close to Article One in the North-East Italy constituency; with 28,535 preferences, he came twelfth and was not elected.

In the general elections of 2022, he ran for a seat at the Senate in the single-member constituency of Friuli-Venezia Giulia by the centre-left coalition, obtaining 25.98% and losing the challenge against the centre-right candidate Luca Ciriani.
