= Nicola Giorgino =

Italian politician

Mayor of Andria
- In office 30 March 2010 – 29 April 2019
- Preceded by: Vincenzo Zaccaro
- Succeeded by: Giovanna Bruno

President of the Province of Barletta-Andria-Trani
- In office 11 October 2016 – 29 April 2019
- Preceded by: Francesco Spina
- Succeeded by: Bernardo Lodispoto

Personal details
- Born: 17 September 1969 (age 57) Andria, Province of Bari, Italy
- Party: The People of Freedom (until 2013); Forza Italia (2013-2019); Lega Nord (since 2019)
- Education: University of Bari
- Profession: Lawyer

Nicola Giorgino (born 17 September 1969) is an Italian politician.

Former member of the centre-right party The People of Freedom and then Forza Italia, he was elected Mayor of Andria on 30 March 2010. He was re-elected for a second term at the 2015 Italian local elections.

He resigned and was removed from office on 29 April 2019 after an internal government crisis. He subsequently left Forza Italia, and joined the right-wing populist party Lega Nord.

He also served as President of the Province of Barletta-Andria-Trani from October 2016 to April 2019.

== See also ==
- 2010 Italian local elections
- 2015 Italian local elections
- List of mayors of Andria

Political offices
Preceded by Vincenzo Zaccaro	Mayor of Andria; 2010–2019	Succeeded by Giovanna Bruno
Preceded by Francesco Spina	President of the Province of Barletta-Andria-Trani; 2016–2019	Succeeded by Bernardo Lodispoto
