= Alberto Felice De Toni =

Italian academic and engineer (born 1955)

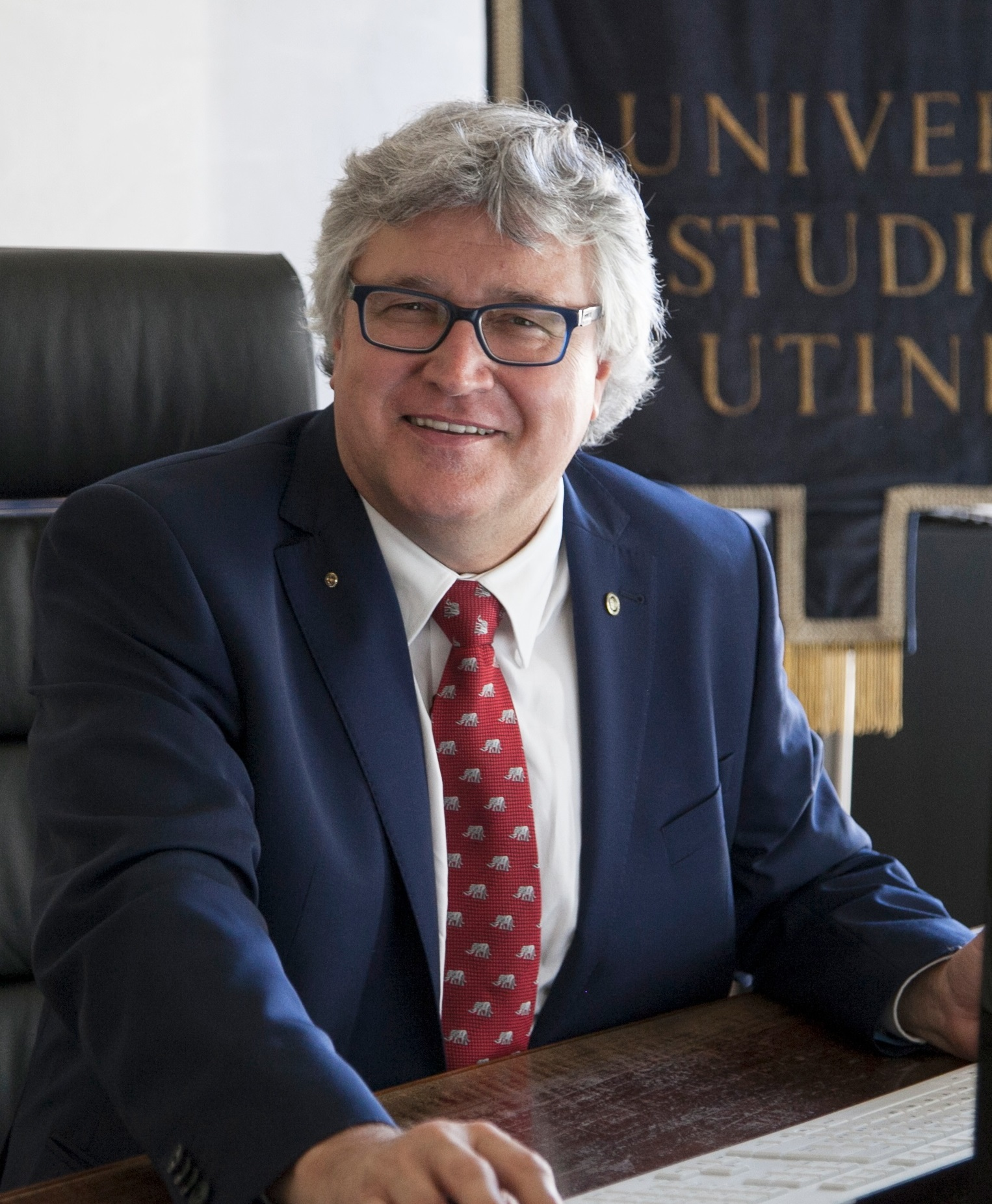
- De Toni in 2017

Mayor of Udine
- Incumbent
- Assumed office 18 April 2023
- Preceded by: Pietro Fontanini

Scientific Director of CUOA Business School
- Incumbent
- Assumed office 1 January 2019

President of the CRUI Foundation
- In office 20 February 2019 – 19 May 2021
- Preceded by: Gaetano Manfredi
- Succeeded by: Ferruccio Resta

Rector of the University of Udine
- In office 1 October 2013 – 30 September 2019
- Preceded by: Cristiana Compagno
- Succeeded by: Roberto Pinton

Personal details
- Born: 27 June 1955 (age 71) Curtarolo, Italy
- Party: Independent
- Education: PhD in Industrial Innovation Sciences
- Alma mater: University of Padua
- Profession: University professor
- Website: Official website

Alberto Felice De Toni (born June 27, 1955) is an Italian engineer and politician, Mayor of Udine since April 18, 2023.

He is Emeritus Professor of Economic and Management Engineering at the University of Udine and scientific director of CUOA Business School.

== Studies and academic career ==
After completing his scientific high school diploma, he graduated magna cum laude in 1980 in Chemical Engineering at the University of Padua. He worked at ENI Research in San Donato Milanese until 1983, when he enrolled in the first cycle of the Ph.D. program in Industrial Innovation Sciences at the University of Padua, where he obtained the degree in 1986 with excellent results. In 1987, he became a researcher in economic and management engineering at the University of Udine, where he became an associate professor in 1992 and a full professor in 2000.

At the same University, he served as President of the Degree Program in Management Engineering from 2000 to 2006 and Dean of the Faculty of Engineering from 2006 to 2012.

He was Rector of the University of Udine from 2013 to 2019.

From 2015 to 2018, he was the Secretary-General of the Conference of Rectors of Italian Universities (CRUI), while from February 2019 to May 2021, he was President of the CRUI Foundation.

As part of the Magnificent Meetings promoted by CRUI, on June 29 and 30, 2017, in Udine, he organized the G7 University – Education for All with the support of the Ministry of Education, University, and Research (MIUR). During this event, representatives from over 170 universities and organizations from Europe, America, and Asia developed the so-called "Udine G7 University Manifesto."

On May 3, 2024, he was granted the title of Emeritus Professor.

== Other assignments ==
From 2005 to 2010, he was President of the Agency for Economic Development of the Mountain (Agemont) of Friuli Venezia Giulia, and from 2002 to 2006, he was Vice-President of AREA Science Park in Trieste.

In the statutory biennium 2009-2011, he was President of the Italian Association of Management Engineering (AiIG), while from 2007 to 2011, he was President of the National Commission for the Reorganization of Technical and Vocational Education under the Ministry of Education, University, and Research.

He served as President of the Independent Evaluation Body of the Istituto Superiore di Sanità from 2015 to 2023 and President of the Evaluation Nucleus at the University of Palermo.

He was President of the Evaluation Body of CINECA from 2018 to 2021 and a member of the Strategic Steering Committee of the European University Institute from 2019 to 2021.

He was President of the Governing Committee of the Higher School for Special Defense Orders from November 20, 2020, to September 11, 2024.

Since 2020, he has been an ordinary member of the Academia Europaea.

He was a candidate for the center-left coalition in the 2023 municipal elections in Udine, supported by the Partito Democratico, Patto per l'Autonomia, Azione-Italia Viva, Alleanza Verdi and Sinistra, and local civic lists, and was elected in the runoff with 52.8% of the votes against the incumbent mayor Pietro Fontanini.

Since November 20, 2024, he has been a member of the Bureau of the National Association of Italian Municipalities (ANCI) with a mandate for Universities and Research.

== Publications ==
De Toni amassed over 380 scientific publications in the field of Management Engineering with a focus on operations management, innovation management and complexity management.

Some of his publications are:

- De Toni A. F. (2011), International Operations Management. Lessons in Global Business, Routledge - Taylor & Francis Group: London (UK), pp. 288, ISBN 978-1409403296.
- De Toni A. F., Tonchia S. (1998), Manufacturing flexibility: a literature review, International Journal of Production Research, Vol. 36, n. 6, pp. 1587–1617.
- Battistella C., De Toni A. F., De Zan G. & Pessot E. (2017), Cultivating business model agility through focused capabilities: a multiple case study, Journal of Business Research, Vol. 73, pp. 65–82.
- De Toni A. F., Pessot E. (2020), Investigating organisational learning to master project complexity: An embedded case study, Journal of Business Research, available online.
- De Toni A. F., Siagri R. & Battistella C. (2021), Corporate foresight: Anticipating the Future, Revised Edition, Routledge - Taylor & Francis Group: London (UK), pp. 234, ISBN 978-0367567460.
- 5. De Toni A. F., De Marchi S. (2023), Self-organised schools. Educational leadership and innovative learning environments, Routledge - Taylor & Francis Group: London (UK), ISBN 978-1032132341.
