= MadrHacks =

Italian non-profit organization and ethical hacking team

MadrHacks APS
- Formation: c. 2020 (Team); 17 September 2025 (Incorporated)
- Type: Associazione di Promozione Sociale (APS)
- Tax ID no.: 94163910303
- Legal status: Active
- Purpose: Cybersecurity, Ethical Hacking, CTF Competitions, Education
- Headquarters: Udine, Friuli-Venezia Giulia, Italy
- Location: University of Udine
- Region served: Italy, International
- Members: Open to all individuals who share the association's principles
- Affiliations: University of Udine
- Website: www.madrhacks.org

MadrHacks is an Italian non-profit entity organization and the ethical hacking team of the University of Udine. Based in Udine, the group operates as a Social Promotion Association (Associazione di Promozione Sociale or APS) focused on cybersecurity education, research, and competition.

The team is best known for winning the CyberCup (the Italian national university championship) in 2024 and for organizing snakeCTF, an annual international Capture the Flag (CTF) competition.

== History and etymology ==
The team was formed around 2020 following the University of Udine's participation in CyberChallenge.IT, an Italian national training program for young cyberdefenders. Initially an informal student group within the Department of Mathematics, Computer Science, and Physics (DMIF), the group established itself to continue competitive hacking activities and peer mentorship.

The name "MadrHacks" is a portmanteau combining the English word "Hacks" with Madrac, the word for "snake" or "grass snake" in the Friulian language. This serpentine theme is maintained in the team's branding and the name of their flagship competition, snakeCTF.

On September 17, 2025, the group was formally incorporated as a non-profit entity (MadrHacks APS) by a decree of the Friuli-Venezia Giulia region, registering in the Single National Register of the Third Sector (RUNTS).

== Activities ==
The organization's statute mandates activities in digital culture promotion, cybersecurity awareness, and the responsible disclosure of software vulnerabilities.

=== Competitive hacking ===
MadrHacks participates in national and international CTF competitions, where participants solve security challenges in categories such as cryptography, web security, and binary exploitation.

- CyberCup: In July 2024, MadrHacks won the second edition of the CyberCup, the official Italian championship for university teams, organized by the Cybersecurity National Lab. The team had placed third in the previous edition.
- International Rankings: The team competes globally on platforms like CTFtime, frequently ranking among the top teams in Italy.

=== Education ===
The group serves as a training ground for students at the University of Udine. It supports the local node of CyberChallenge.IT, providing mentorship to high school and university students entering the field. The association organizes seminars and technical workshops to foster collaboration between students, researchers, and local companies.

== snakeCTF ==
snakeCTF is an international cybersecurity competition organized and hosted by MadrHacks. Established to promote cybersecurity culture and connect talent with industry, it has grown into a significant event in the European CTF calendar.

=== Format ===
The competition utilizes a hybrid format:

- Qualifiers: An online "Jeopardy-style" round held in the summer, open to teams worldwide. In the 2025 edition, over 500 teams participated in the selection phase.
- Finals: The top teams (typically 8 to 15) are invited to an on-site final round. The finals are hosted in Lignano Sabbiadoro, Italy, often at the Bella Italia EFA Village.

=== Real World CTF ===
A distinguishing feature of the snakeCTF finals is the "Real World" component. In addition to traditional digital challenges, finalists participate in physical security tasks scattered throughout the host city. These challenges involve:

- Wireless Analysis: Hacking WiFi networks and Bluetooth Low Energy (BLE) beacons.
- Radio Frequency: Decoding radio signals.
- Physical Puzzles: Location-based objectives requiring team navigation and hardware interaction.

=== Editions ===
Year	Teams	Rounds	Locations
2023	180	1	Online
2024	345	2	Online and Lignano Sabbiadoro
2025	518	2	Online and Lignano Sabbiadoro

== Governance ==
As an Associazione di Promozione Sociale, MadrHacks is governed by an Assembly of associates and a Board of Directors (Consiglio Direttivo). The board consists of 3 to 7 elected members who serve four-year terms. The organization is headquartered in Udine.
