= Giannicola Sinisi =

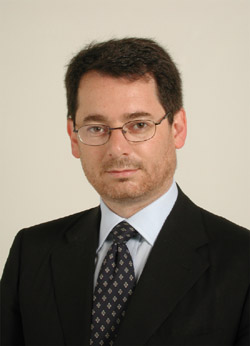

Member of the Senate of the Republic
- In office 28 April 2006 – 28 April 2008
- Constituency: Apulia

Member of the Chamber of Deputies
- In office 9 May 1996 – 27 April 2006

Mayor of Andria
- In office 15 December 1993 – 23 February 1996
- Preceded by: Giuseppina Marmo
- Succeeded by: Vincenzo Caldarone

Undersecretary of State for the Interior
- In office 18 May 1996 – 18 December 1999

Personal details
- Born: 2 June 1957 (age 69) Andria, Province of Bari, Italy
- Party: Christian Democracy (until 1993); Democratic Alliance (1993–1998); Italian People's Party (1999–2002); The Daisy (2002–2007); Democratic Party (2007–2014)
- Profession: Magistrate

Giannicola Sinisi (born 2 June 1957) is an Italian magistrate and politician who served as mayor of Andria (1993–1996), deputy (1996–2006) and senator (2006–2008). He also served as Undersecretary of State for the Interior in the Prodi I Cabinet and later in the D'Alema I Cabinet.

Sinisi was also a representative of the Parliamentary Assembly of the Council of Europe from 2006 to 2008.
