= Pietro Colonnella =

Italian politician (born 1956)

Undersecretary of State for the Ministry of Regional Affairs
- In office 17 May 2006 – 5 May 2008
- Prime Minister: Romano Prodi
- Minister: Linda Lanzillotta

President of the Province of Ascoli Piceno
- In office 8 May 1995 – 14 June 2004
- Preceded by: Romualdo Cafini
- Succeeded by: Massimo Rossi

Personal details
- Born: 19 February 1956 (age 70) Acquaviva Picena, Province of Ascoli Piceno, Italy
- Party: Democratic Party of the Left; Democrats of the Left; Democratic Party

Pietro Colonnella (born 19 February 1956) is an Italian politician of the Democratic Party. He served as president of the Province of Ascoli Piceno from 1995 to 2004 and as Undersecretary of State for Regional Affairs in the Prodi II Cabinet from 2006 to 2008.
