= List of presidents of the Province of Udine =

President of the Province of Udine
- Presidente della Provincia di Udine
- Inaugural holder: Giovanni Gropplero
- Formation: 1889
- Final holder: Pietro Fontanini
- Abolished: 2018

The president of the Province of Udine was the head of the provincial administration of Udine, a local government authority in Friuli-Venezia Giulia, Italy.

The province was abolished as an administrative body on 1 January 2017 as part of the reform of local government in Friuli Venezia Giulia. The abolition process was established by Regional Law no. 20 of 9 December 2016, which provided for the suppression of the provinces and the transfer of their functions to other local authorities. The last president, Pietro Fontanini, left office in April 2018. The province was replaced by a Regional Decentralization Entity (Ente di Decentramento Regionale), an administrative body headed by a general director.

The Province of Udine is scheduled to be re-established on 1 January 2027, following the reform of the local government system of Friuli-Venezia Giulia which provides for the reintroduction of the provinces.

== List ==
=== Presidents of the Provincial Deputation (1889–1926) ===
No.	Portrait	Name	Term of office		Political party
No.	Portrait	Name	Took office	Left office	Political party
1		Giovanni Gropplero	1889	1899	?
2		Ignazio Renier	1899	1906	?
3		Damiano Roviglio	1906	1912	?
4		Luigi Spezzotti	1912	1917	?
–		Luigi Spezzotti	1917	1919	Extraordinary Commissioner
		Agostino Candolini	1920	1923	Italian People's Party

=== Presidents of the Provincial Rectorate (1927–1945) ===
No.	Portrait	Name	Term of office		Party
No.	Portrait	Name	Start	End	Party
		Gianni Micoli Toscano	1928	1930	National Fascist Party
		Alberto Asquini	1930	1932	National Fascist Party
		Francesco Tullio	1932	1936	National Fascist Party
		Raffaello Pagani	1937	1943	National Fascist Party

=== Presidents of the Provincial Deputation (1945–1951) ===
No.	Portrait	Name	Term of office		Party
No.	Portrait	Name	Start	End	Party
		Agostino Candolini	1948	1951	Christian Democracy

=== Presidents of the Province (1951–2018) ===
No.	Portrait	Name	Term of office		Party
No.	Portrait	Name	Start	End	Party
1		Agostino Candolini	1951	1962	Christian Democracy
2		Luigi Burtulo	1962	1967	Christian Democracy
3		Vinicio Turello	1967	1978	Christian Democracy
4		Giancarlo Englaro	1978	1985	Christian Democracy
5		Tiziano Venier	7 October 1985	27 July 1990	Christian Democracy
5		Tiziano Venier	27 July 1990	4 July 1994	Christian Democracy
6		Giovanni Pelizzo	1 August 1994	8 May 1995	Italian People's Party
6		Giovanni Pelizzo	8 May 1995	28 June 1999	Italian People's Party
7		Carlo Melzi	28 June 1999	26 August 2000	Forza Italia
8		Marzio Strassoldo	11 June 2001	11 April 2006	Forza Italia
8		Marzio Strassoldo	11 April 2006	10 January 2008	Forza Italia
9		Pietro Fontanini	15 April 2008	25 April 2013	Lega Nord
9		Pietro Fontanini	25 April 2013	22 April 2018	Lega Nord

=== Regional Decentralization Entity of Udine (2020–present) ===
No.	General director	Term of office	
No.	General director	Start	End
–	Augusto Viola (Extraordinary commissioner)	1 April 2020	2 August 2023
1	Ida Valent	2 August 2023	2 August 2026
1	Ida Valent	2 August 2026	Incumbent

== Sources ==
- "Storia amministrativa dell'ente". Ministero dell'Interno.
- Menichini, Piera (2005). "I presidenti delle Province dall'Unità alla Grande guerra: repertorio analitico". Storia Amministrazione Costituzione (13): 296–297.
