= List of mayors of Andria =

List of Mayors of the city of Andria

Mayor of Andria
- Sindaco di Andria

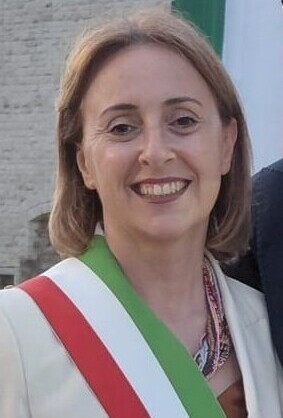
- Incumbent; Giovanna Bruno since 13 October 2020
- Appointer: Popular election
- Term length: 5 years, renewable once
- Formation: 1797
- Website: Official website

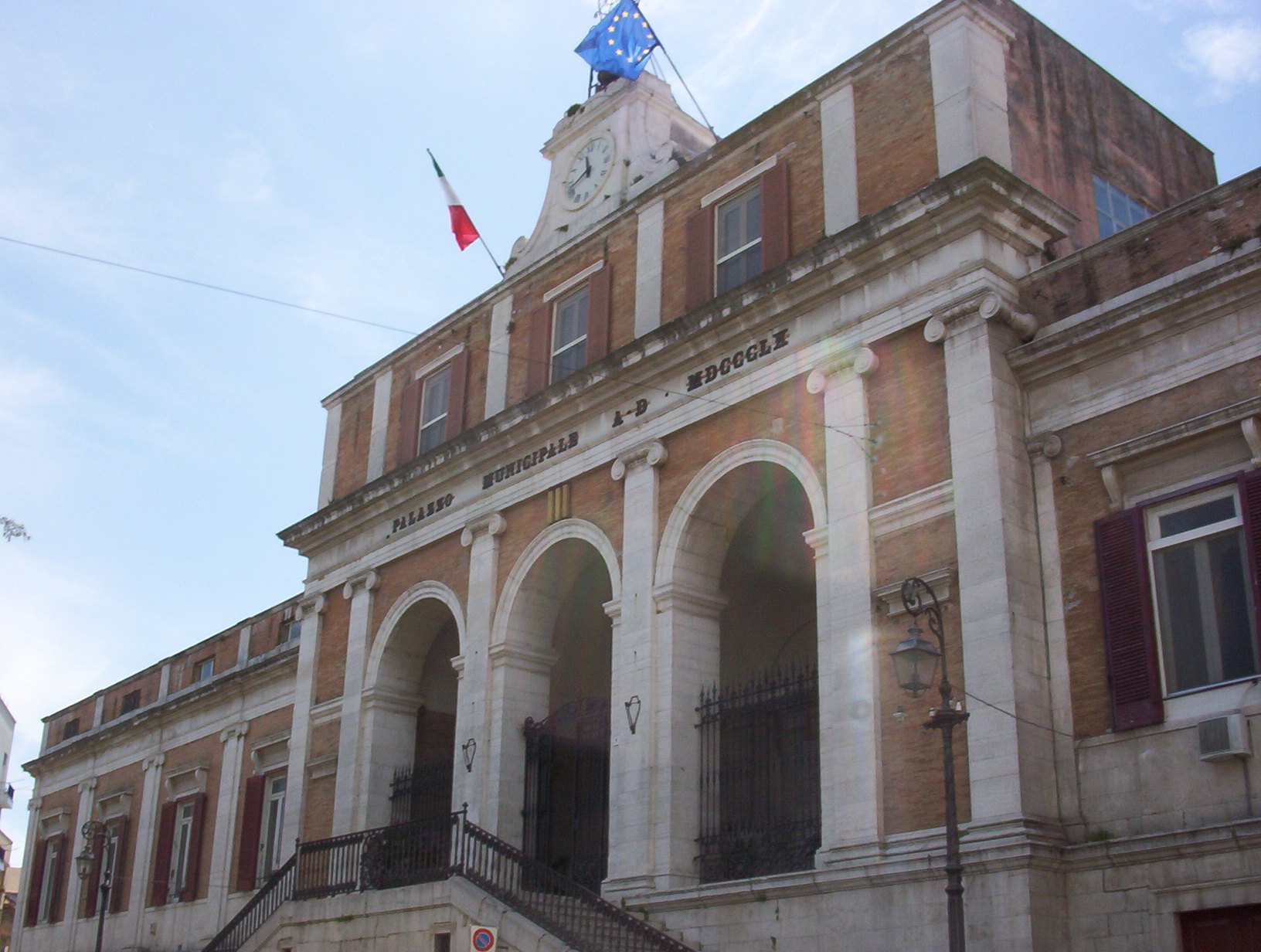
Andria's Town Hall.

The Mayor of Andria is an elected politician who, along with the Andria City Council, is accountable for the strategic government of Andria in Apulia, Italy.

The current mayor is Giovanna Bruno (PD), who took office on 13 October 2020.

== Overview ==
According to the Italian Constitution, the Mayor of Andria is member of the City Council.

The Mayor is elected by the population of Andria, who also elects the members of the City Council, controlling the Mayor's policy guidelines and is able to enforce his resignation by a motion of no confidence. The Mayor is entitled to appoint and release the members of his government.

Since 1996 the Mayor is elected directly by Andria's electorate: in all mayoral elections in Italy in cities with a population higher than 15,000 the voters express a direct choice for the mayor or an indirect choice voting for the party of the candidate's coalition. If no candidate receives at least 50% of votes, the top two candidates go to a second round after two weeks. The election of the City Council is based on a direct choice for the candidate with a preference vote: the candidate with the majority of the preferences is elected. The number of the seats for each party is determined proportionally.

== Italian Republic (since 1946) ==
=== City Council election (1946–1993) ===
From 1946 to 1993, the Mayor of Andria was elected by the City Council.

	Mayor	Term start	Term end	Party
1	Carlo Antolini	1946	1950	PCI
2	Vincenzo Mucci	1950	1952	PCI
3	Onofrio Jannuzzi	1952	1956	DC
4	Giuseppe Marano	1956	1963	DC
5	Natale Di Molfetta	1963	1966	PCI
6	Riccardo Di Corato	1966	1966	PCI
(3)	Onofrio Jannuzzi	1966	1967	DC
7	Franco Fuzio	1967	1967	DC
8	Giuseppe Colasanto	1967	1972	DC
9	Luigi Sperone	1972	1973	DC
10	Leonardantonio Sforza	1973	1978	PCI
11	Giovanni Lomuscio	1978	1979	PCI
12	Bernardino Di Nanni	1979	1980	DC
13	Vincenzo Pistillo	1980	1981	PSI
14	Giuseppe Alicino	1981	1983	Ind
15	Francesco Piccolo	1983	1986	PCI
16	Vincenzo D'Avanzo	1986	1988	DC
17	Riccardo Terzulli	1988	1991	DC
18	Attilio Busseti	1991	1993	DC
19	Giuseppina Marmo	1993	1993	DC

=== Direct election (since 1993) ===
Since 1993, under provisions of new local administration law, the Mayor of Andria is chosen by direct election, originally every four, then every five years.

	Mayor	Term start	Term end	Party	Coalition	Election
20	Giannicola Sinisi	6 December 1993	23 February 1996 (Note: Resigned in order to participate to the national general election. The deputy Mayor Vincenzo Caldarone (PDS) held the office till a new municipal election was held.)	AD	PDS • AD	1993
21	Vincenzo Caldarone	24 June 1996	18 April 2000	PDS; DS	PDS • PPI	1996
21	Vincenzo Caldarone	18 April 2000	19 April 2005	PDS; DS	DS • DL • Dem • PRC	2000
22	Vincenzo Zaccaro	19 April 2005	26 February 2010 (Note: Resigned.)	DL; PD	DS • DL • PRC	2005
Special Prefectural Commissioner tenure (26 February 2010 – 30 March 2010)
23	Nicola Giorgino	30 March 2010	9 June 2015	PdL; FI	PdL	2010
23	Nicola Giorgino	9 June 2015	29 April 2019 (Note: Resigned after losing the majority in the City Council.)	PdL; FI	FI • NcS	2015
Special Prefectural Commissioner tenure (29 April 2019 – 13 October 2020)
24	Giovanna Bruno	13 October 2020 (Note: Election originally scheduled for June 2020 then postponed due to the COVID-19 pandemic.)	8 June 2026	PD	PD • IC • EV • IV	2020
24	Giovanna Bruno	8 June 2026 (Note: Election originally scheduled for September 2025 then postponed to May 2026. According to the Italian law, since 2011 local elections can take place each year only between 15 April and 15 June.)	Incumbent	PD	PD • AVS • A • IV	2026

== Bibliography ==
- "Albo dei Sindaci di Andria dal 1797".
