= Trinitapoli =

Trinitapoli Griko: Triàda
- Comune
- Comune di Trinitapoli
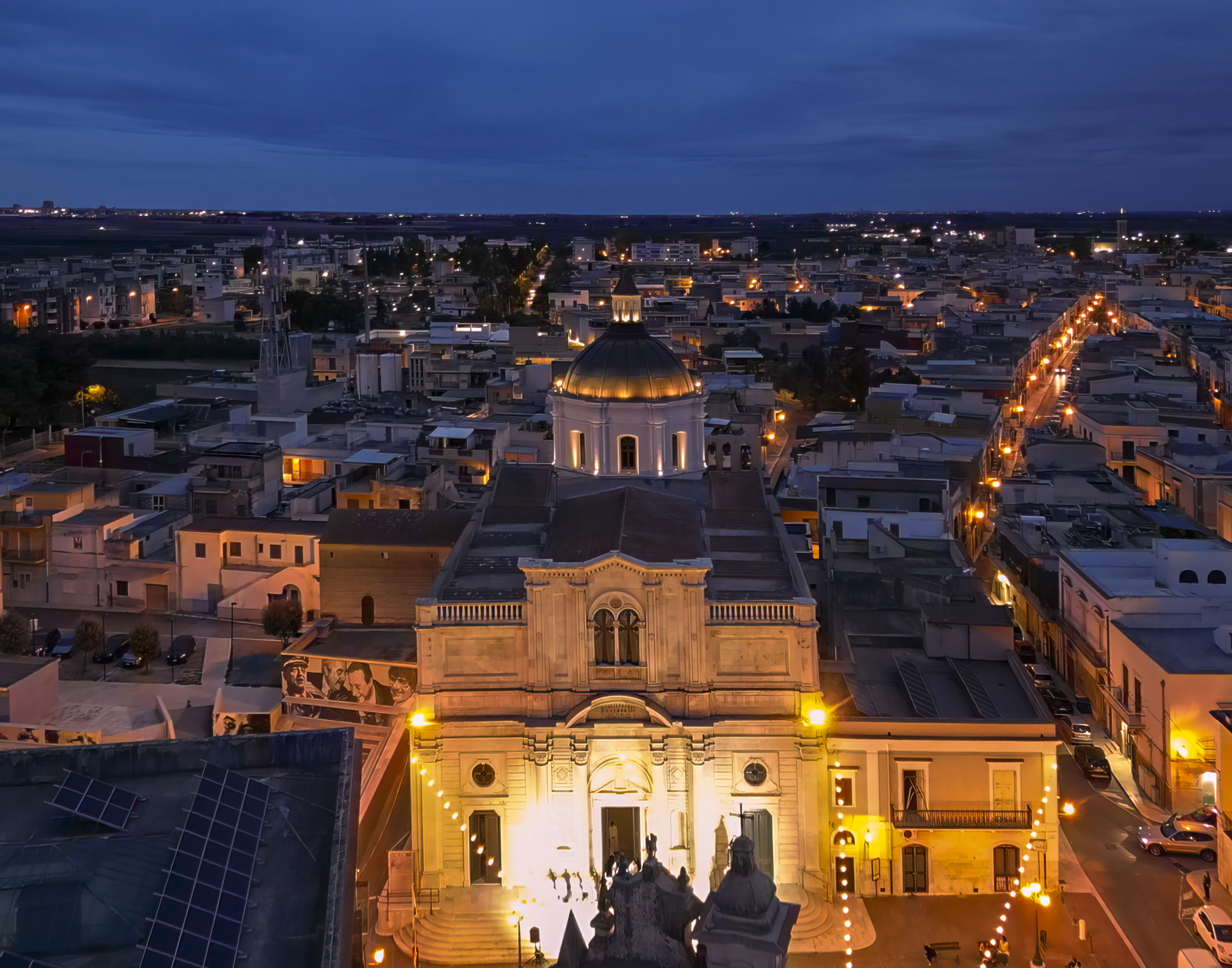
- The church of Santo Stefano Protomartire

- Location within Italy Location within Apulia
- Coordinates: 41°21′N 16°6′E
- Country: Italy
- Region: Apulia
- Province: Barletta-Andria-Trani (BT)
- Frazioni: Ofantino

Government
  - Mayor: Francesco di Feo

Area
  - Total: 148.77 km^{2} (57.44 sq mi)

Population (31 March 2018)
  - Total: 14,604
  - Density: 98.165/km^{2} (254.25/sq mi)
- Demonym: Casalini or Trinitapolesi
- Time zone: UTC+1 (CET)
  - Summer (DST): UTC+2 (CEST)
- Postal code: 76015
- Dialing code: 0883
- Patron saint: St. Stephen and Holy Mary of Loreto
- Website: Official website

Trinitapoli (Dauno-Appenninico: U Casòilǝ) is a town and comune in the province of Barletta-Andria-Trani in the Apulia region of southeast Italy.

A few kilometres from the town are the ruins of Salapia (later called Salpia and Salpi), which was already a bishopric by 314, when its bishop Pardus took part in the Council of Arles. The town flourished from the 11th to the 13th centuries but its later decline was sealed when the episcopal see was suppressed in 1547 and its territory united to that of Trani.
