= CUOA Foundation =

Business school in Altavilla Vicentina, Italy

Coordinates: 45°30′34″N 11°27′59″E

- Fondazione CUOA
- Motto: Coltiviamo talenti
- Type: Private
- Established: 1957
- President: Federico Visentin
- Students: 2900
- Location: Altavilla Vicentina, Italy
- Website: www.cuoa.it

CUOA Foundation (Centro Universitario di Organizzazione Aziendale – University Centre of Business Administration) is one of the first Business Schools founded in Italy in the 1950s, in an important period for managerial training in Italy.

- President: Federico Visentin
- General Manager: Giuseppe Caldiera
- Scientific Director: Alberto Felice De Toni

The CUOA Foundation opened in 1957 as a post-graduate school for secondary education within the University of Padua and as a Business School supported by enterprises, category associations, lending institutions, public bodies and the Universities of Padua, Trento, Trieste, Udine, Venice, Verona and IUAV - University of Venice.

The Foundation, with its more than 50 years of activity, developed relationships with about 3,000 companies and both national and international organizations. Fondazione CUOA manages more than 500 lecturers, didactic and scientific representatives and cooperates with 53 foreign countries and 26 foreign Universities and Business Schools. The Foundation is a founding member of ASFOR, , the association of Italian Business Schools. It is numbered among the first Italian Business School and it is considered the most important in the north east of Italy. .

Fondazione CUOA is hosted in the Villa Valmarana Morosini in Altavilla Vicentina, in the outskirts of Vicenza.

== History ==
The CUOA Foundation was founded in 1957 by Lino Zanussi within the University of Padua’s Engineering Faculty, as a university centre for studies about business administration. Its purpose was the creation of a post-secondary specialization course in business organisation, its first edition started in 1958.

In 1959 CUOA became a post graduation school of business organization and then a specialization school linked to University of Padua’s Engineering Faculty

In 1970 CUOA became a University Consortium for business organisation studies. The school moved to Lungargine Portello in Padua. The Consortium’s purposes were to assure the functioning of the specialization school in business organisation, to promote researches in the field of organisation, management, control of bodies or companies; to stimulate and implement initiatives and activities aimed at teaching subjects as organisation of industrial and commercial activities of these bodies and companies and to finance their activities.

Since 1980 Fondazione CUOA has been hosted in the Villa Valmarana Morosini, an 18th-century building in Atavilla Vicentina. In the 1980s several activities for enterprises, banks and young people were developed thanks to the European Social Fund.

Between 1983 and 1986 the Universities of Venice, Verona, Trento and Udine took part to the consortium.

In the 1990s news changes were promoted: both organizational and about intervention areas. The training started to gain an international size and the initiatives started to include new sectors, from the banks to other public administration divisions, strengthening at the same time the relationship with small - medium industries.

On 7 November 1997 a new phase of institutional renewal started: CUOA became a Foundation in order to strengthen the relationship with the territory and to develops its rule of cultural institution.

== Presidents ==
  - Dal 2016 Federico Visentin
  - 2013 - 2016 Matteo Marzotto
  - 2007 - 2013 Vittorio Mincato
  - 2004 - 2007 Elio Marioni
  - 1992 - 2004 Gian Carlo Ferretto
  - 1990 - 1992 Ottone Visconti D'Oleggio
  - 1980 - 1990 Pilade Riello
  - 1970 - 1980 Mario Formenton
  - 1957 - 1970 Guido Ferro

== Master Honoris Causa ==
- 2016 - Carlo Messina
- 2015 - Brunello Cucinelli
- 2015 - Carlo Clavarino
- 2014 - Nerio Alessandri
- 2012 - Leonardo Del Vecchio
- 2011 - Federico Faggin
- 2010 - Mario Draghi
- 2009 - Enrico Bondi
- 2007 - Sergio Marchionne
- 2006 - Mario Moretti Polegato
- 2005 - Emma Marcegaglia
- 2005 - Vittorio Colao
- 2005 - Gianni Zonin
- 2004 - Mario Marangoni
- 2004 - Gianni Mion
- 2003 - Luca Cordero di Montezemolo
- 2003 - Alessandro Profumo
- 2002 - Giordano Veronesi
- 2002 - Ennio Doris
- 2001 - Vittorio Coin
- 2000 - Dino Marchiorello
- 2000 - Renzo Rosso
- 1999 - Gianfranco Zoppas
- 1997 - Ivano Beggio
- 1995 - Pietro Marzotto

== See also ==
- List of business schools in Europe
- List of Italian universities
- Vicenza
