= Leonardantonio Sforza =

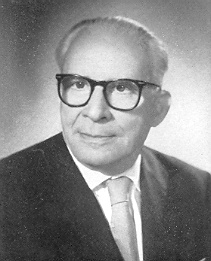

Member of the Chamber of Deputies
- In office 12 June 1958 – 4 June 1968
- Constituency: Bari–Foggia

Mayor of Andria
- In office 1973–1978
- Preceded by: Luigi Sperone
- Succeeded by: Giovanni Lomuscio

Personal details
- Born: 14 March 1899 Andria, Province of Bari, Kingdom of Italy
- Died: 12 May 1979 (aged 80)
- Party: Italian Communist Party
- Profession: Lawyer

Leonardantonio Sforza (14 March 1899 – 12 May 1979) was an Italian lawyer and politician of the Italian Communist Party. He was elected to the Chamber of Deputies for the 1958 general election, serving two consecutive legislatures until 1968. Later, he served as mayor of Andria from 1973 to 1978.
