= Fabio Salvi =

Italian politician (born 1975)

President of the Province of Ascoli Piceno
- Incumbent
- Assumed office 16 March 2026
- Preceded by: Sergio Loggi

Mayor of Venarotta
- Incumbent
- Assumed office 26 May 2014
- Preceded by: Emidio Sciamanna

Personal details
- Born: 6 December 1975 (age 50) Amandola, Marche, Italy

Fabio Salvi (born 6 December 1975) is an Italian politician serving as president of the Province of Ascoli Piceno since 2026. He has served as mayor of Venarotta since 2014.

In the 2026 provincial election, Salvi, supported by the centre-right coalition of Forza Italia, Brothers of Italy and Lega, was elected president of the Province of Ascoli Piceno, defeating incumbent Sergio Loggi, the centre-left candidate. Salvi received 57,248 weighted votes, approximately 66% of the valid vote.
