= List of presidents of the Province of Barletta-Andria-Trani =

President of the Province of Barletta-Andria-Trani
- Presidente della Provincia di Barletta-Andria-Trani
- Incumbent; Bernardo Lodispoto since 27 September 2019
- Term length: 4 years
- Inaugural holder: Francesco Ventola
- Formation: 2009

The president of the Province of Barletta-Andria-Trani is the head of the provincial government in Barletta-Andria-Trani, Apulia, Italy. The president oversees the administration of the province, coordinates the activities of the municipalities, and represents the province in regional and national matters.

Since September 2019, the office has been held by Bernardo Lodispoto, a centre-left independent.

== History ==
The Province of Barletta-Andria-Trani was established in 2004, after being separated from the Province of Bari. In its initial phase, the new province was administered by a government-appointed extraordinary commissioner, pending the organisation of its institutional bodies. Following the 2009 elections, Francesco Ventola took office as the first president of the province, marking the beginning of the province's ordinary democratic administration. The president was directly elected by the citizens for a five-year term and was responsible for appointing and dismissing the members of the Provincial Executive.

Following the 2014 Delrio Law, the president is elected by an assembly composed of the mayors and municipal councillors of the municipalities within the province. The president serves a four-year term and acts as the legal representative of the province, presiding over the Provincial Council and the Provincial Assembly of Mayors.

== List ==
Nº	Portrait	Name	Term of office		Party	Election
Nº	Portrait	Name	Start	End	Party	Election
1		Francesco Ventola	8 June 2009	14 October 2014	The People of Freedom	2009
2		Francesco Spina	14 October 2014	29 February 2016	Independent (centre-right)	2014
–		Giuseppe Corrado (Acting vice-president)	29 February 2016	11 October 2016	Forza Italia	2014
3		Nicola Giorgino	11 October 2016	29 April 2019	Forza Italia	2016
–		Pasquale De Toma (Acting vice-president)	29 April 2019	27 September 2019	Forza Italia	2016
4		Bernardo Lodispoto	27 September 2019	3 December 2023	Independent (centre-left)	2019
4		Bernardo Lodispoto	3 December 2023	Incumbent	Independent (centre-left)	2023

== Sources ==
- "Storia amministrativa dell'ente". Ministero dell'Interno.
