= University of Udine =

University in Udine, Italy

- Università degli Studi di Udine
- Type: State-supported
- Established: 1978
- Affiliations: BioGeM
- Rector: Prof. Roberto Pinton
- Students: 14,986
- Undergraduates: 10,394
- Postgraduates: 2,427
- Doctoral students: 203
- Location: Udine, Italy; 46°4′51″N 13°12′42″E
- Sports teams: CUS Udine
- Website: www.uniud.it

The University of Udine (Italian Università degli Studi di Udine) is a public university in the city of Udine, Italy. It was founded in 1978 as part of the reconstruction plan of Friuli after the earthquake in 1976. Its aim was to provide the Friulian community with an independent centre for advanced training in cultural and scientific studies, it is also an important centre for the study of Friulian language.

The University is actively involved in student and staff exchange projects with universities within the European Union, Australia and Canada, and is currently engaged in close collaboration with several universities from Eastern Europe and other non-EU countries. Moreover, the University participates in many research projects at national and international level. The present number of students enrolled at the University for the academic year 2020/2021 is 14,986.

== Organization ==
As of January 2017, the university is divided into the following departments:

- Department of Economics and Statistics (DIES)
- Department of Food, Environmental and Animal Sciences - (DI4A)
- Department of Languages and Literature, Communication, Education and Society - (DILL)
- Department of Law Sciences (DISG)
- Department of Humanistic Studies and Cultural Heritage - (DIUM)
- Department of Mathematics, Computer Science and Physics (DMIF)
- Department of Medical Sciences and Biology (DSMB)
- Polytechnic Department of Engineering and Architecture - (DPIA)

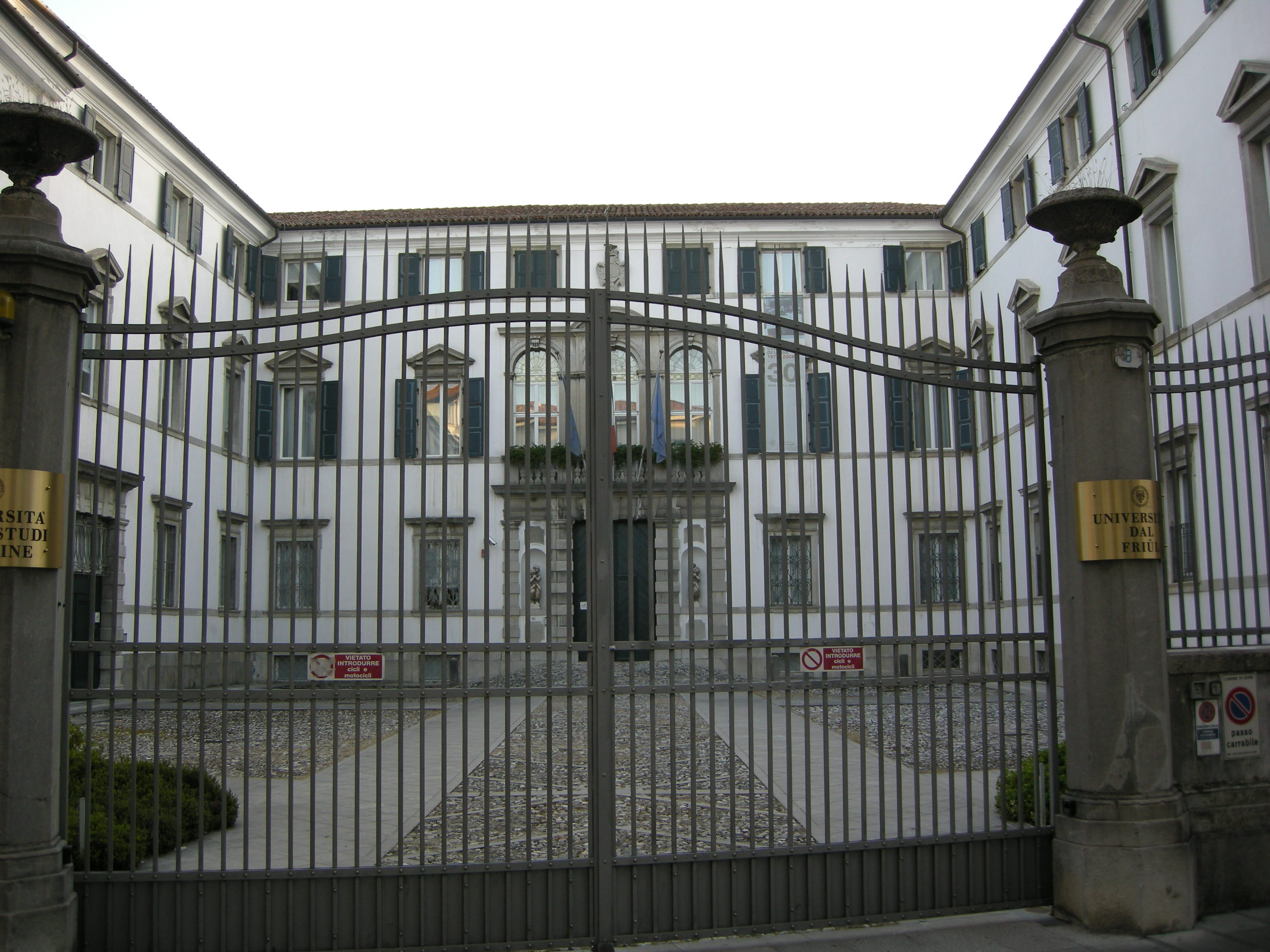

== Rectors ==
- 1978-1979: Antonio Servadei
- 1979-1981: Mario Bonsembiante
- 1981-1983: Roberto Gusmani
- 1983-1992: Franco Frilli
- 1992-2001: Marzio Strassoldo
- 2001-2008: Furio Honsell
- 2008-2013: Cristiana Compagno
- 2013-2019: Alberto Felice De Toni
- 2019-2025: Roberto Pinton
- 2025–present: Angelo Montanari
