= Marco Fioravanti =

Italian politician (born 1983)

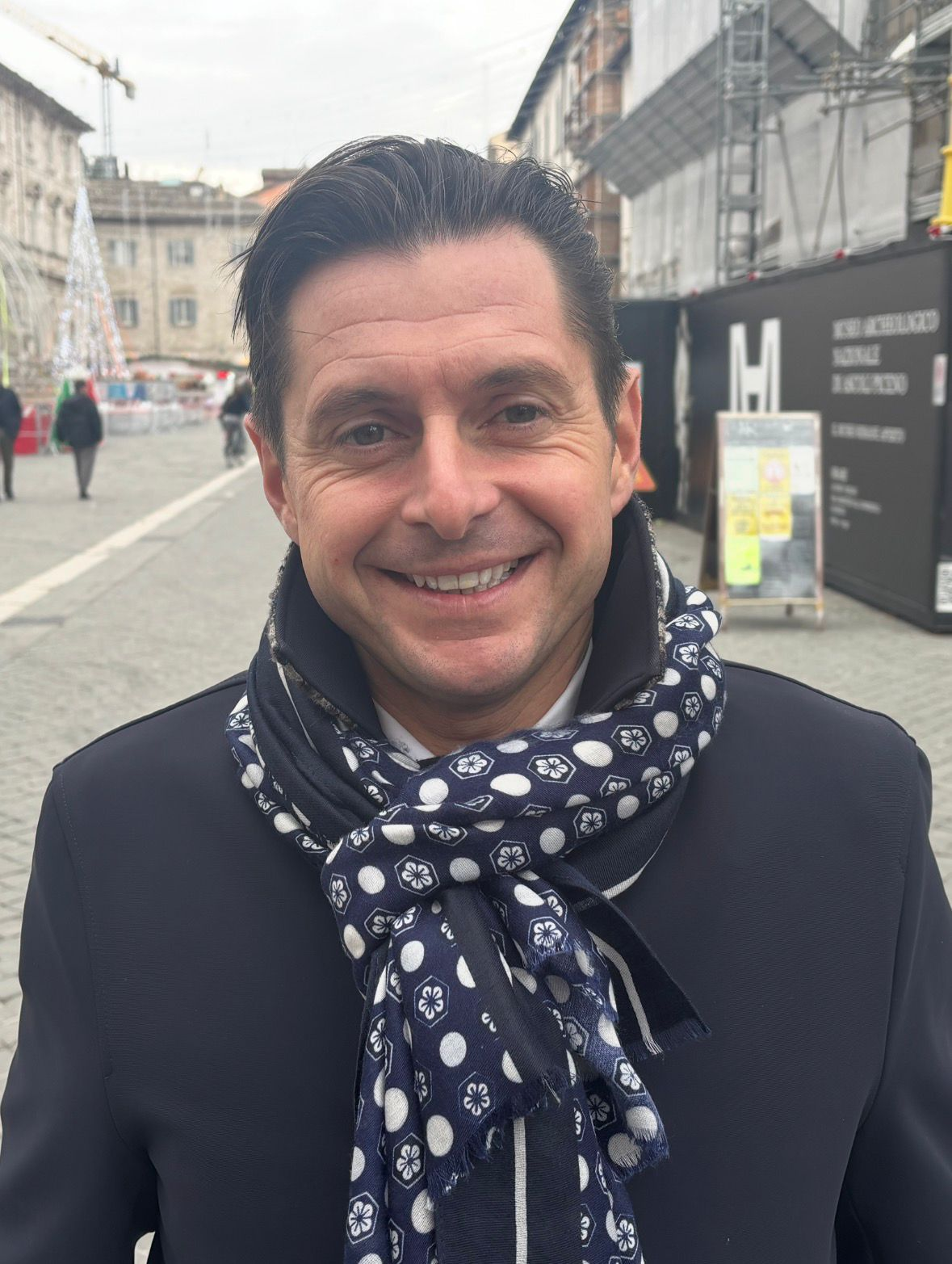
- Fioravanti in 2024

Mayor of Ascoli Piceno
- Incumbent
- Assumed office 11 June 2019
- Preceded by: Guido Castelli

Personal details
- Born: 18 March 1983 (age 43) Ascoli Piceno, Marche, Italy
- Party: Brothers of Italy
- Education: University of Macerata
- Occupation: entrepreneur

Marco Fioravanti (born 18 March 1983 in Ascoli Piceno) is an Italian politician.

Formerly member of centre-right party The People of Freedom, he joined Brothers of Italy in 2013. He served as member of the City Council of Ascoli from 2009 to 2019.

Fioravanti ran for Mayor of Ascoli Piceno at the 2019 local elections, supported by a right-wing coalition formed by Brothers of Italy, Lega Nord and local civic lists. He won, beating out former mayor Piero Celani supported by a center-right coalition (Forza Italia and local civil lists) in the runoff; and took office on 11 June 2019.

On 8 June 2024, he ran for re-election, and was handily elected in the first round with 74% of the vote, avoiding a runoff.

He has consistently been one of the most popular provincial capital mayors in Italy, with approval often over 60%. In Il Sole 24 Ore Governance Polls, in 2025 he was the most popular mayor with a 70% approval rating, and in 2026 second with 65%.
