= Piero Celani =

Italian politician (born 1951)

Member of the Regional Council of Marche
- In office 22 June 2015 – 8 June 2024

President of the Province of Ascoli Piceno
- In office 23 June 2009 – 14 October 2014
- Preceded by: Massimo Rossi
- Succeeded by: Paolo D'Erasmo

Mayor of Ascoli Piceno
- In office 17 June 1999 – 14 March 2009
- Preceded by: Roberto Allevi
- Succeeded by: Guido Castelli

Personal details
- Born: 15 September 1951 (age 74) Ascoli Piceno, Italy
- Party: Forza Italia; The People of Freedom; Forza Italia
- Education: University of Ancona
- Occupation: Civil engineer

Piero Celani (born 15 September 1951) is an Italian civil engineer and politician who served as mayor of Ascoli Piceno (1999–2009), president of the Province of Ascoli Piceno (2009–2014), and a member of the Regional Council of Marche (2015–2024). He also served as vice president of the Regional Council from 2017 to 2020.
