= Francesco Ventola =

Italian politician (born 1971)

Francesco Ventola MEP
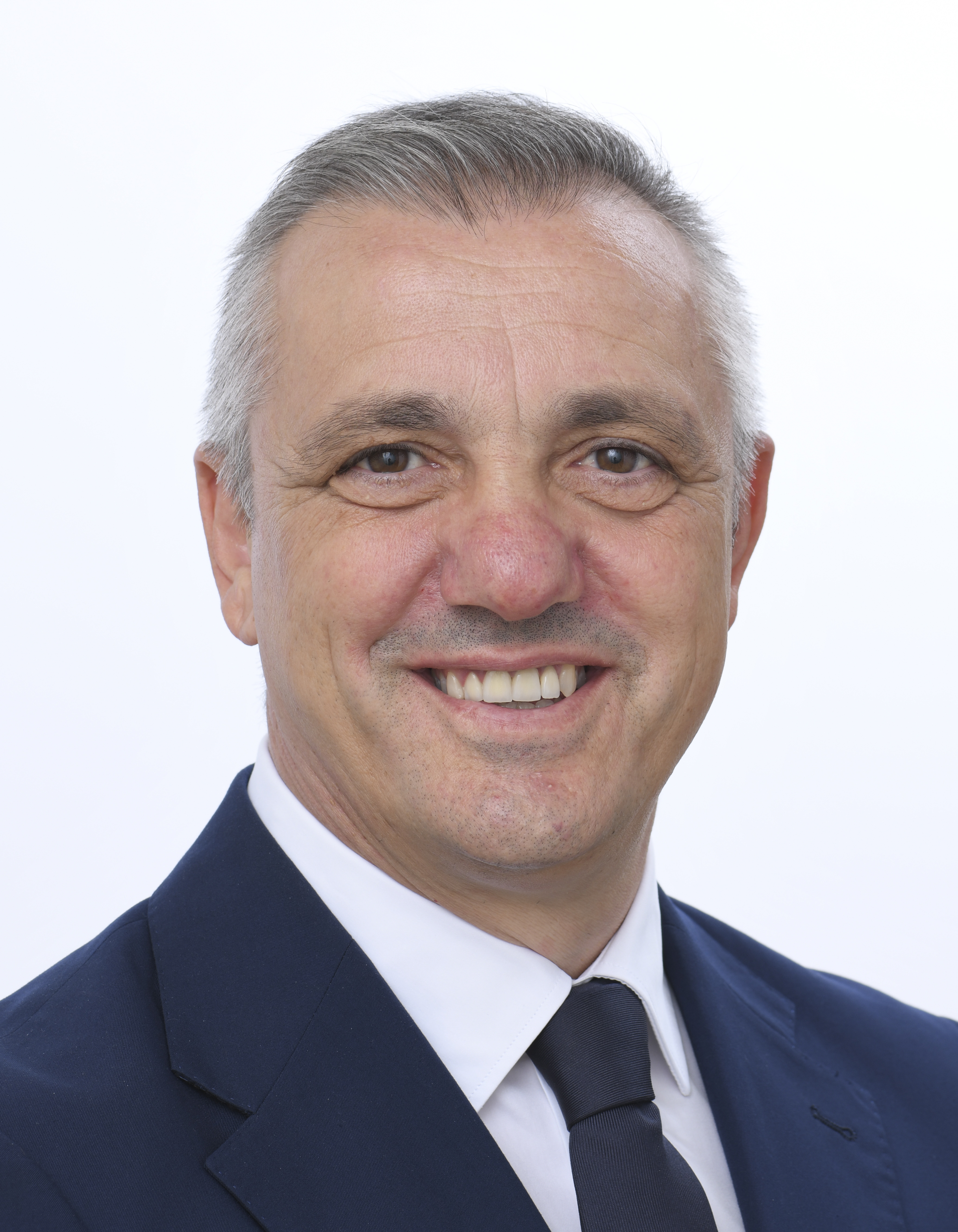

Member of the European Parliament for Southern Italy
- Incumbent
- Assumed office 16 July 2024

Member of the Regional Council of Apulia
- In office 22 July 2015 – 22 November 2025

President of the Province of Barletta-Andria-Trani
- In office 8 June 2009 – 14 October 2014
- Preceded by: Office established
- Succeeded by: Francesco Spina

Mayor of Canosa di Puglia
- In office 13 June 2002 – 21 May 2012
- Preceded by: Giovanni Lomuscio
- Succeeded by: Ernesto La Salvia

Personal details
- Born: 12 May 1971 (age 55) Canosa di Puglia, Apulia, Italy
- Party: Brothers of Italy
- Other political affiliations: European Conservatives and Reformists Party

Francesco Ventola (born 12 May 1971) is an Italian politician of Brothers of Italy who was elected member of the European Parliament in 2024. He served as mayor of Canosa di Puglia from 2002 to 2012, and as president of the province of Barletta-Andria-Trani from 2009 to 2015. From 2015 to 2025, he has been a member of the Regional Council of Apulia.

== Biography ==
In 1996, at the age of 26, he was first elected to his town’s city council, becoming a council member in 1997. In 2000, he served as the leader of the Forza Italia (1994) faction in the newly elected city council of Canosa. In 2002, he was elected mayor (in a runoff), and was re-elected in 2007 with a large majority of the vote (70.1% in the first round). That same year, he assumed the regional presidency of AGES (Autonomous Agency for the Management of the Register of Municipal and Provincial Secretaries). In 2004, he became Vice President of the Apulian section of ANCI.

In the 2009 local elections, he was elected the first president of the Province of Barletta-Andria-Trani as a representative of the Centre-right politics coalition.

From 2003 to 2009, Francesco Ventola worked on drafting a new master plan, known as the Pug, for the municipality of Canosa di Puglia.

After completing his term as provincial president, between May and June 2015 he was elected as an opposition councilor to the Apulia Council on the “Oltre con Fitto” ticket, having received 8,130 votes in the Barletta-Andria-Trani district, in support of gubernatorial candidate Francesco Schittulli.

He ran in the 2020 regional elections in Apulia on the Brothers of Italy ticket and was re-elected as a regional councilor, having received 9,248 votes in the Barletta-Andria-Trani district.

Following the 2022 Italian general election and Ignazio Zullo’s election to the Senate, he became president of the regional group of Brothers of Italy on October 18, 2022.

In May 2024, during the European elections, he was nominated as a candidate on the Fratelli d'Italia list for the Southern Italy (European Parliament constituency).He was elected with over 89,000 votes.

On July 23 of that same year, he was elected as one of the vice-chairs of the European Parliament Committee on Regional Development.
