= Giovanna Bruno =

Italian politician

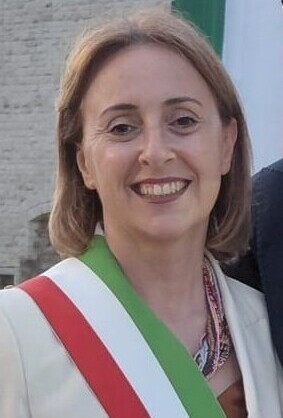

Mayor of Andria
- Incumbent
- Assumed office 13 October 2020
- Preceded by: Nicola Giorgino

Personal details
- Born: 28 June 1975 (age 51) Andria, Apulia, Italy
- Party: Democratic Party
- Education: University of Bari
- Profession: Lawyer

Giovanna Bruno (born 28 June 1975) is an Italian politician.

She is a member of the Democratic Party and ran for Mayor of Andria at the 2020 Italian local elections, supported by a centre-left coalition. She was elected at the second round with 58.87% and took office on 13 October 2020.

== See also ==
- 2020 Italian local elections
- List of mayors of Andria

Political offices
Preceded by Nicola Giorgino	Mayor of Andria since 2020	Incumbent
