= Guido Castelli =

Italian lawyer and politician

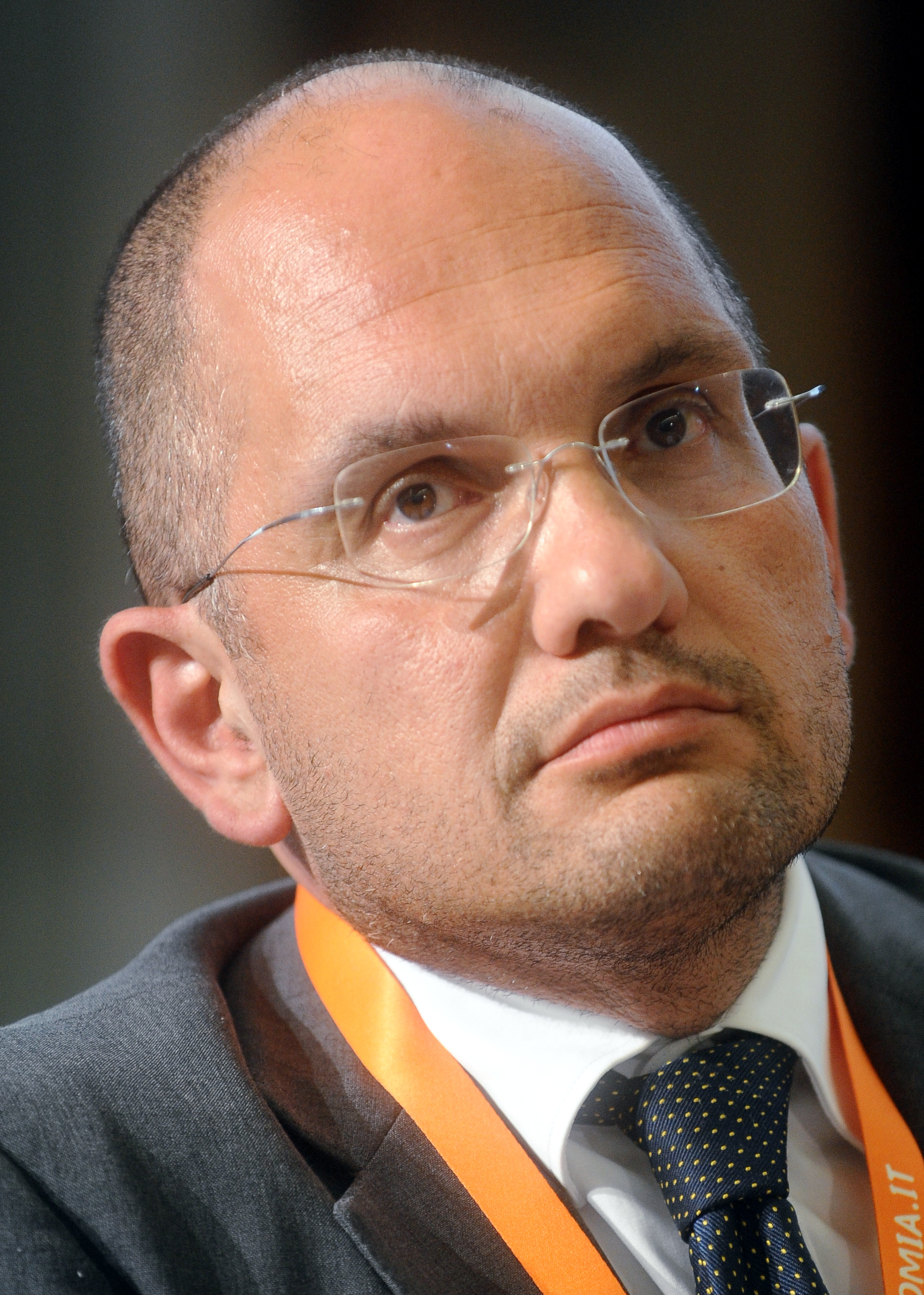

Member of the Senate
- Incumbent
- Assumed office 13 October 2022
- Constituency: Marche

Member of the Provincial Council of Ascoli Piceno
- In office 14 June 1995 – 18 July 2000

Member of the Regional Council of Marche
- In office 28 April 2000 – 21 July 2009

Mayor of Ascoli Piceno
- In office 23 June 2009 – 11 June 2019
- Preceded by: Piero Celani
- Succeeded by: Marco Fioravanti

Regional assessor of Economy of Marche
- In office 19 October 2020 – 19 October 2022
- President: Francesco Acquaroli

Personal details
- Born: 30 November 1965 (age 60) Siena, Tuscany, Italy
- Party: MSI (1981-1995); AN (1995-2009); PdL (2009-2013); FI (2013-2019); FdI (since 2019)
- Education: University of Macerata
- Profession: lawyer

Guido Castelli (born 30 November 1965 in Siena) is an Italian lawyer and politician.

Former member of the Italian Social Movement and National Alliance, he has been a member of the centre-right party Forza Italia since 2013. He was elected Mayor of Ascoli Piceno on 23 June 2009, and re-elected for a second term on 28 May 2014.

== See also ==
- 2014 Italian local elections
- List of mayors of Ascoli Piceno

Political offices
Preceded by Piero Celani	Mayor of Ascoli Piceno; 2009–2019	Succeeded by Marco Fioravanti
