= Federico Rossi (engineer) =

Italian engineer and politician (1948–2020)

Undersecretary of State for the Ministry of University and Research
- In office 26 February 1996 – 16 May 1996
- Prime Minister: Lamberto Dini
- Minister: Giorgio Salvini

Rector of the University of Cassino and Southern Lazio
- In office 1990–1996
- Preceded by: Piergiorgio Parroni
- Succeeded by: Oronzo Pecere

Personal details
- Born: 18 March 1948 Vallo della Lucania, Province of Salerno, Italy
- Died: 6 April 2020 (aged 72) Naples, Italy
- Education: University of Naples Federico II
- Occupation: Engineer

Federico Rossi (18 March 1948 – 6 April 2020) was an Italian engineer, university professor, and politician, who served as Undersecretary of State for University and Research in the Dini government, and scientific advisor in the first Prodi government. He was also member of the directors' board of the National Research Council.

Rossi also served as rector of the University of Cassino and Southern Lazio from 1990 to 1996.
