= List of presidents of the Province of Ascoli Piceno =

President of the Province of Ascoli Piceno
- Presidente della Provincia di Ascoli Piceno
- Incumbent; Fabio Salvi since 16 March 2026
- Term length: 4 years
- Inaugural holder: Domenico Travaglini
- Formation: 1889

The president of the Province of Ascoli Piceno is the head of the provincial government in Ascoli Piceno, Marche, Italy. The president oversees the administration of the province, coordinates the activities of the municipalities, and represents the province in regional and national matters.

Since March 2026, the office has been held by Fabio Salvi of the centre-right coalition.

== List ==
=== Presidents of the Provincial Deputation (1889–1926) ===
No.	Portrait	Name	Term of office		Party
No.	Portrait	Name	Start	End	Party
1		Domenico Travaglini	1889	1891	?
2		Luigi De Castellotti	1891	1895	?
3		Tancredi Tozzi Condivi	1895	1900	?
4		Enrico Teodori	1900	1904	?
5		Giuseppe Seienni	1904	1905	?
6		Vittorio Trebbi	1905	1906	?
7		Nicola Palloni	1906	1907	?
8		Giuseppe Mario De Marzi	1907	1912	?
9		Augusto Grassi	1912	?	?

=== Presidents of the Provincial Deputation (1945–1951) ===
No.	Portrait	Name	Term of office		Party
No.	Portrait	Name	Start	End	Party
1		Nunzio Giulio Teodori	17 January 1945	5 October 1946	
2		Guido Cingoli	5 October 1946	3 March 1949	
3		Cesare Valentinotti	3 March 1949	30 June 1951	Christian Democracy

=== Presidents of the Province (1951–present) ===
No.	Portrait	Name	Term of office		Party
No.	Portrait	Name	Start	End	Party
1		Antonio Feriozzi	30 June 1951	22 December 1960	Christian Democracy
2		Giovanni Ramazzotti	22 December 1960	15 June 1975	Christian Democracy
3		Nazario Sauro Ramadori	15 June 1975	2 October 1978	Italian Socialist Party
4		Francesco Carbone	2 October 1978	6 June 1990	Italian Socialist Party
5		Giovanni Basso	6 June 1990	5 February 1992	Italian Socialist Party
6		Federico Vitali	5 February 1992	14 May 1994	Christian Democracy
7		Romualdo Cafini	14 May 1994	10 May 1995	Italian People's Party
8		Pietro Colonnella	8 May 1995	29 June 1999	Democratic Party of the Left
8		Pietro Colonnella	29 June 1999	14 June 2004	Democrats of the Left
9		Massimo Rossi	14 June 2004	22 June 2009	Communist Refoundation Party
10		Piero Celani	24 June 2009	14 October 2014	The People of Freedom
11		Paolo D'Erasmo	14 October 2014	30 October 2018	Democratic Party
12		Sergio Fabiani	30 October 2018	21 October 2021	Democratic Party
–		Luigi Capriotti (Acting president)	21 October 2021	19 December 2021	Brothers of Italy
13		Sergio Loggi	19 December 2021	16 March 2026	Italia Viva
14		Fabio Salvi	16 March 2026	incumbent	Independent (centre-right)

== Sources ==
- "Storia amministrativa dell'ente". Ministero dell'Interno.
- La Provincia di Ascoli Piceno dallo Stato Unitario all'Europa Unita. Ascoli Piceno: D'Auria Industrie Grafiche. March 2004. p. 428.
- Menichini, Piera (2005). "I presidenti delle Province dall'Unità alla Grande guerra: repertorio analitico". Storia Amministrazione Costituzione (13): 226–227.
