= List of mayors of Ascoli Piceno =

Mayor of Ascoli Piceno
- Sindaco di Ascoli Piceno

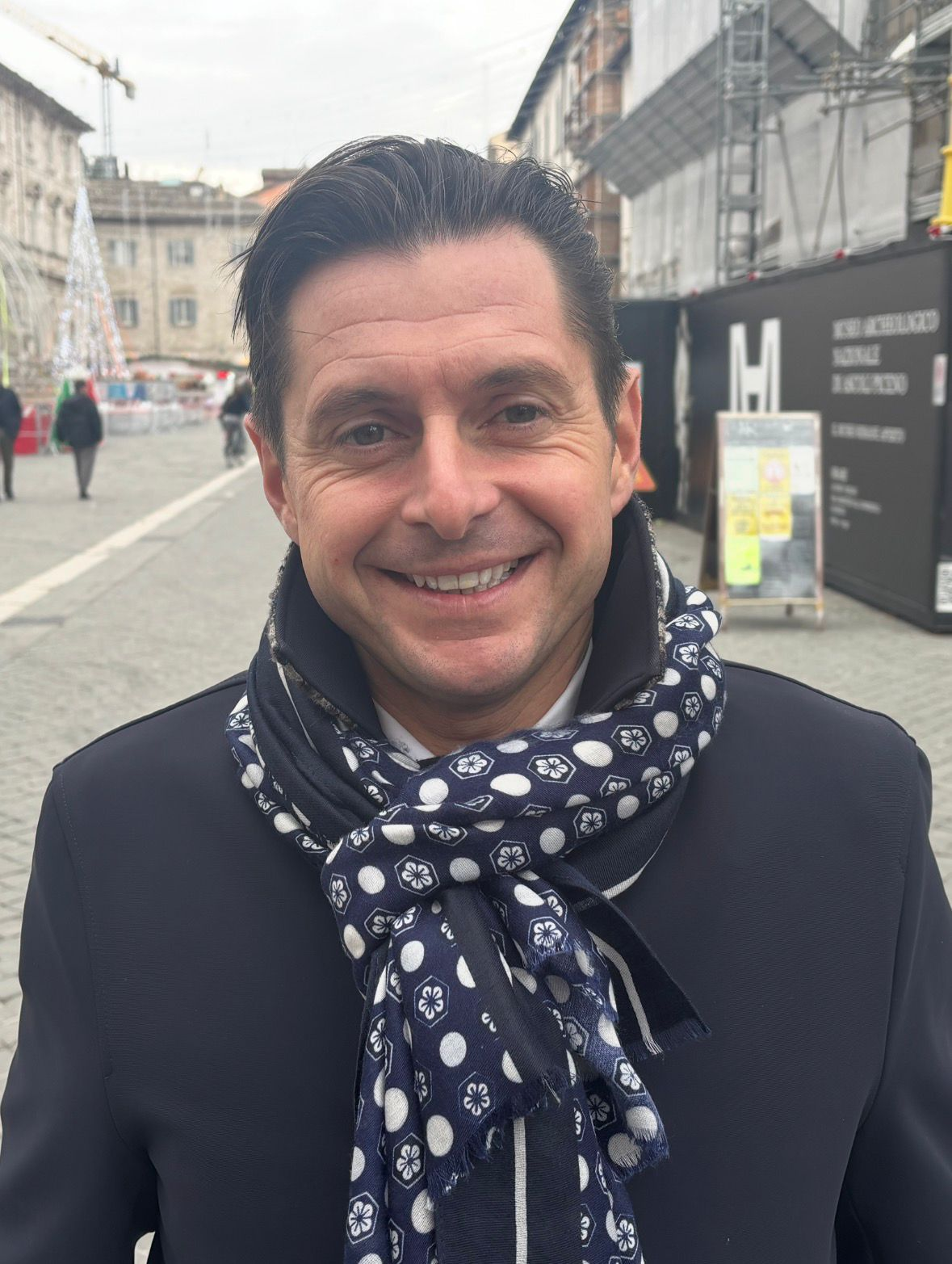
- Incumbent; Marco Fioravanti (FdI) since 11 June 2019
- Appointer: Popular election
- Term length: 5 years, renewable once
- Formation: 1865
- Website: Official website

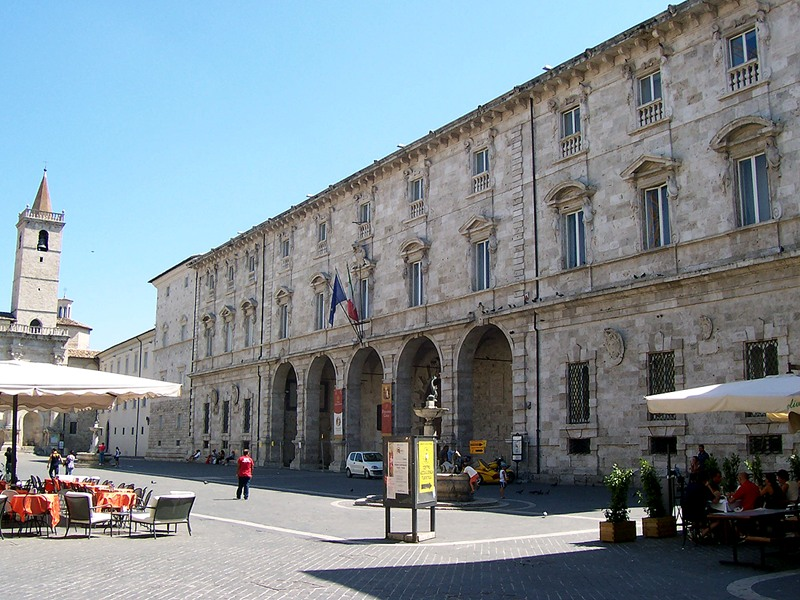
Ascoli Piceno's Town Hall.

The mayor of Ascoli Piceno is an elected politician who, along with the Ascoli Piceno City Council, is accountable for the strategic government of Ascoli Piceno in Marche, Italy.

The current mayor is Marco Fioravanti (FdI), who took office on 11 June 2019.

== Overview ==
According to the Italian Constitution, the mayor of Ascoli Piceno is member of the City Council.

The mayor is elected by the population of Ascoli Piceno, who also elect the members of the City Council, controlling the mayor's policy guidelines and is able to enforce his resignation by a motion of no confidence. The mayor is entitled to appoint and release the members of his government.

Since 1995 the mayor is elected directly by Ascoli Piceno's electorate: in all mayoral elections in Italy in cities with a population higher than 15,000 the voters express a direct choice for the mayor or an indirect choice voting for the party of the candidate's coalition. If no candidate receives at least 50% of votes, the top two candidates go to a second round after two weeks. The election of the City Council is based on a direct choice for the candidate with a preference vote: the candidate with the majority of the preferences is elected. The number of the seats for each party is determined proportionally.

== Italian Republic (since 1946) ==
=== City Council election (1946-1995) ===
From 1946 to 1995, the mayor of Ascoli Piceno was elected by the City Council.

	Mayor	Term start	Term end	Party
1	Serafino Orlini	29 April 1946	29 December 1960	DC
2	Mario Cataldi	29 December 1960	31 May 1965	DC
Special Commission's tenure (31 May 1965 – 23 July 1966)
3	Pacifico Saldari	23 July 1966	23 December 1969	DC
4	Vincenzo Aliberti	23 December 1969	2 September 1971	DC
5	Antonio Orlini	2 September 1971	7 December 1978	DC
6	Luigi De Santis	7 December 1978	3 July 1980	DC
7	Ugo De Santis	3 July 1980	31 August 1981	DC
8	Mario Cataldi	31 August 1981	3 July 1985	DC
9	Gianni Forlini	3 July 1985	6 May 1987	DC
10	Aldo Loreti	6 May 1987	13 November 1987	PSDI
11	Amedeo Ciccanti	13 November 1987	26 June 1990	DC
12	Carlo Mario Nardinocchi	26 June 1990	15 February 1993	DC
13	Gino Andreani	15 February 1993	31 March 1994	DC
14	Nazzareno Cappelli	31 March 1994	9 May 1995	DC

=== Direct election (since 1995) ===
Since 1995, under provisions of new local administration law, the mayor of Ascoli Piceno is chosen by direct election, originally every four, then every five years.

	Mayor	Term start	Term end	Party	Coalition	Election
15	Roberto Allevi	9 May 1995	14 June 1999	PDS	PDS • PRC • FdV • PdD	1995
16	Piero Celani	14 June 1999	14 June 2004	FI	FI • AN • CCD	1999
16	Piero Celani	14 June 2004	14 March 2009 (Note: Resigned.)	FI	FI • AN • UDC	2004
Special Prefectural Commissioner tenure (14 March 2009 – 23 June 2009)
17	Guido Castelli	23 June 2009	28 May 2014	PdL; FI	PdL	2009
17	Guido Castelli	28 May 2014	11 June 2019	PdL; FI	FI • FdI • NCD	2014
18	Marco Fioravanti	11 June 2019	13 June 2024	FdI	Lega • FdI	2019
18	Marco Fioravanti	13 June 2024	Incumbent	FdI	FI • FdI • Lega • NM	2024

== Bibliography ==
- "Comune di Ascoli Piceno. 70° Anniversario del Consiglio Comunale 1946-2016 (PDF)". Comune di Ascoli Piceno (in Italian).
