= Amedeo Ciccanti =

Italian politician (born 1951)

Amedeo Ciccanti (born 15 July 1951) is an Italian politician who served as Mayor of Ascoli Piceno (1987–1990). He was a Senator for two terms (2001–2006, 2006–2008) and Deputy for one (2008–2013).
