= AREA Science Park =

Coordinates: 45.65754°N 13.82778°E

The Trieste AREA Science Park is composed of two neighbouring campus developments located near the exit from the motorway linking Trieste to Austria and Slovenia.

Operational since 1982, the AREA Science Park was founded with the initial aim of providing a link between the business community and the many high-level international scientific institutions in Trieste.
