= List of mayors of Udine =

Mayor of Udine
- Sindaco di Udine

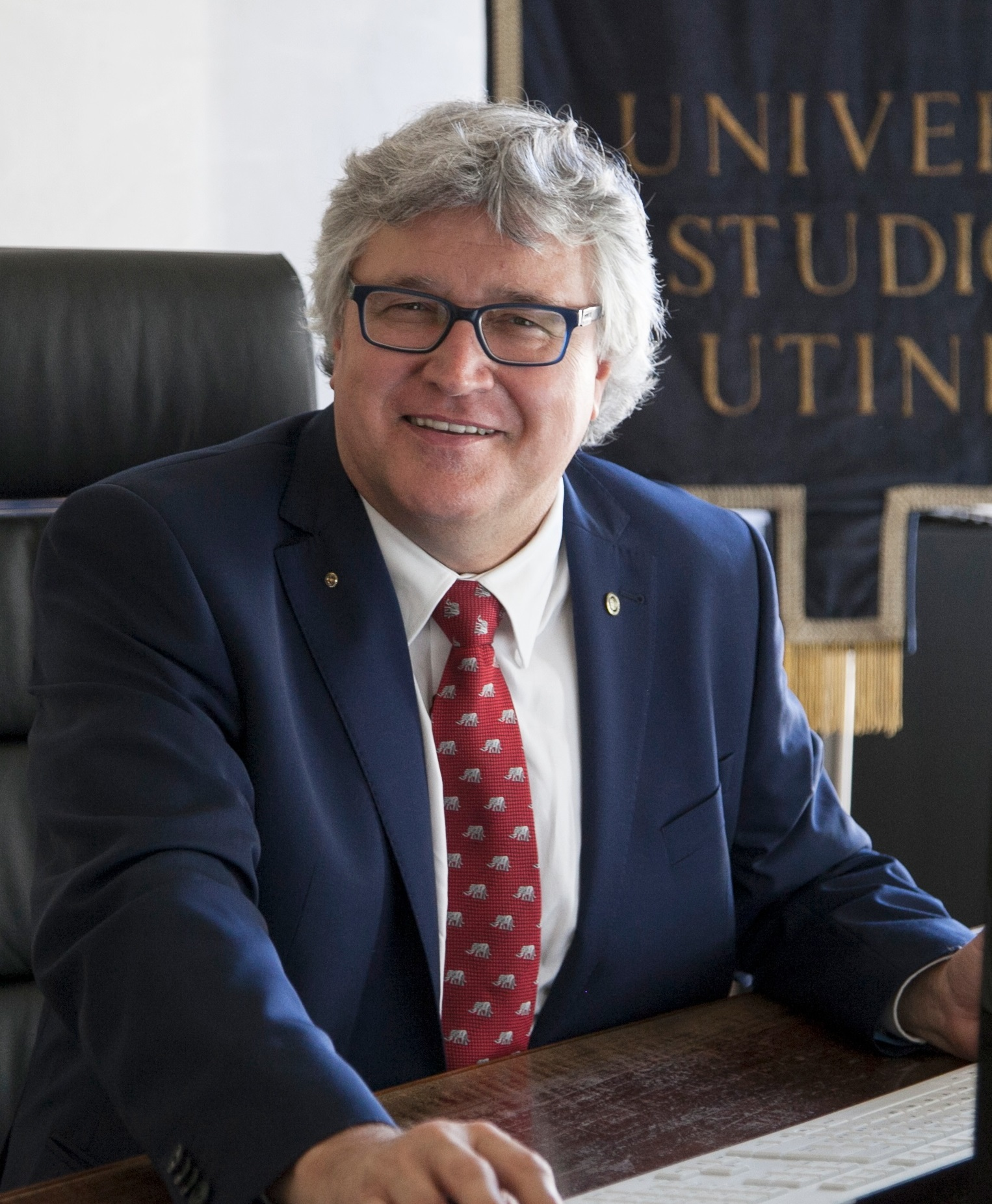
- Incumbent; Alberto Felice De Toni since 18 April 2023
- Appointer: Popular election
- Term length: 5 years, renewable once
- Formation: 1866
- Website: Official website

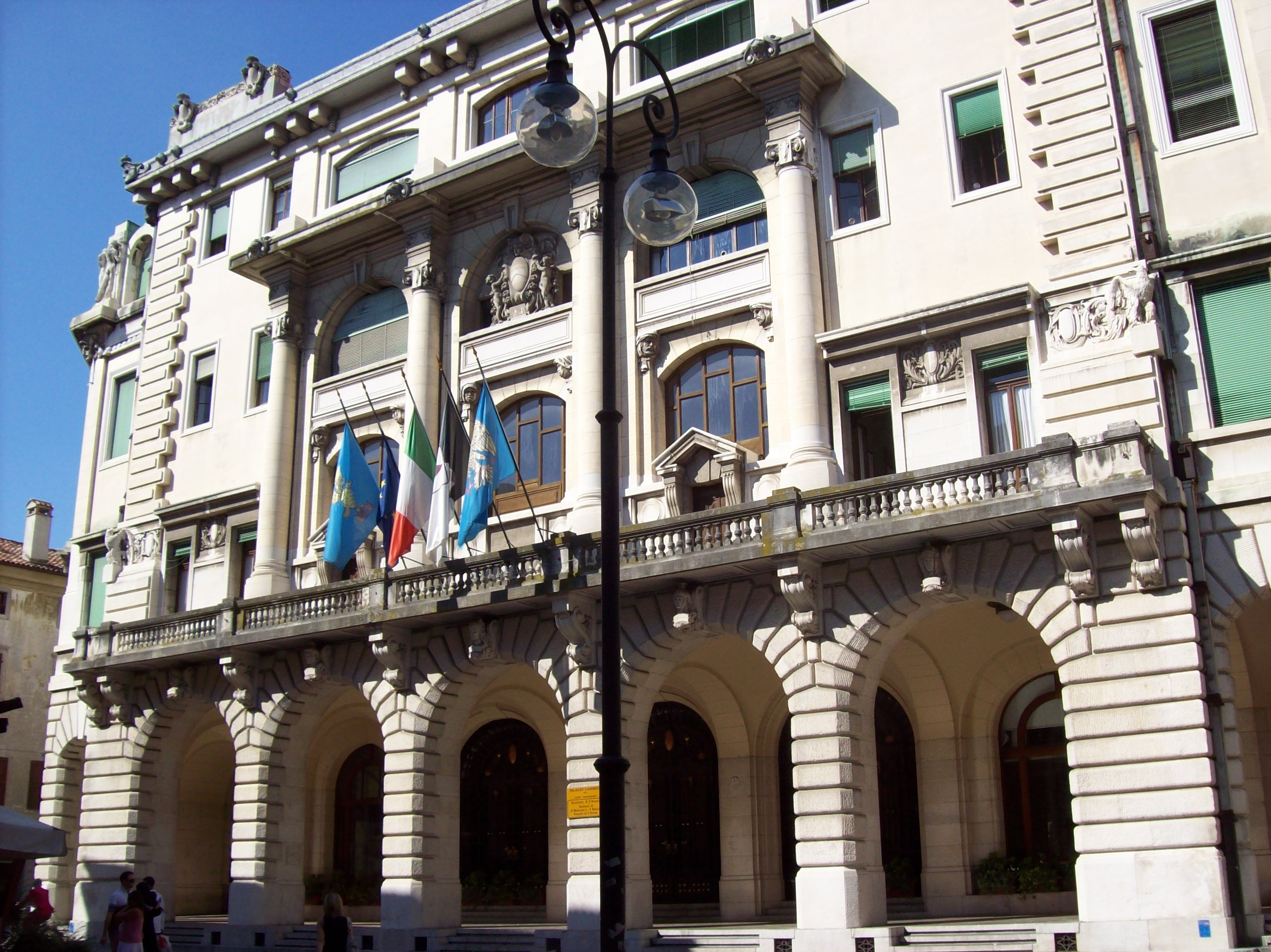
Palazzo d'Aronco is the seat of the Mayor of Udine.

The mayor of Udine is an elected politician who, along with the Udine's city council, is accountable for the strategic government of Udine in Friuli-Venezia Giulia, Italy.

The current mayor is Alberto Felice De Toni, a centre-left independent, elected on 17 April 2023.

== Overview ==
According to the Italian Constitution, the mayor of Udine is member of the city council.

The mayor is elected by the population of Udine, who also elect the members of the city council, controlling the mayor's policy guidelines and is able to enforce his resignation by a motion of no confidence. The mayor is entitled to appoint and release the members of his government.

Since 1995 the mayor is elected directly by Udine's electorate: in all mayoral elections in Italy in cities with a population higher than 15,000 the voters express a direct choice for the mayor or an indirect choice voting for the party of the candidate's coalition. If no candidate receives at least 50% of votes, the top two candidates go to a second round after two weeks. The election of the City Council is based on a direct choice for the candidate with a preference vote: the candidate with the majority of the preferences is elected. The number of the seats for each party is determined proportionally.

== Republic of Italy (since 1946) ==
=== City Council election (1945-1995) ===
From 1945 to 1995, the Mayor of Udine was elected by the city's Council.

	Mayor	Term start	Term end	Party
1	Giovanni Cosattini	1 May 1945	19 April 1948	PSI
2	Giacomo Centazzo	19 April 1948	16 October 1960 (Note: Died in office.)	DC
3	Bruno Cadetto	7 November 1960	16 June 1975	DC
4	Angelo Candolini	16 June 1975	2 October 1985 (Note: Died in office.)	DC
5	Piergiorgio Bressani	29 October 1985	10 July 1990	DC
6	Pietro Zanfagnini	10 July 1990	23 August 1993	PSI
7	Claudio Mussato	23 August 1993	10 May 1995	DC

=== Direct election (since 1995) ===
Since 1995, under provisions of new local administration law, the Mayor of Udine is chosen by direct election, originally every four, and since 2003 every five years.

	Mayor	Took office	Left office	Party	Coalition	Election
8	Enzo Barazza (1953–2024)	10 May 1995	26 September 1997 (Note: Resigned. The deputy mayor Andrea Montich (PDS) held the office till a Special Commissioner was appointed by the Prefect.)	PRI	PDS • PRI • FdV • PPI	1995
Special Prefectural Commissioner tenure (18 July 1998 – 2 December 1998)
9	Sergio Cecotti (b. 1956)	2 December 1998	9 June 2003	LN; Ind	LN • MF	1998
9	Sergio Cecotti (b. 1956)	9 June 2003	27 April 2008	LN; Ind	DS • DL • FdV	2003
10	Furio Honsell (b. 1958)	27 April 2008	7 May 2013	PD	PD • SA • IdV and leftist lists	2008
10	Furio Honsell (b. 1958)	7 May 2013	19 January 2018 (Note: Resigned. The deputy mayor Carlo Giacomello (PD) held the office till a new municipal election was held.)	PD	PD • SEL and leftist lists	2013
11	Pietro Fontanini (b. 1952)	14 May 2018	18 April 2023	LN	LN • FI • FdI	2018
12	Alberto Felice De Toni (b. 1955)	18 April 2023	Incumbent	Ind	PD • AVS • A • IV	2023
