= Margherita di Savoia, Apulia =

Margherita di Savoia
- Comune
- Comune di Margherita di Savoia
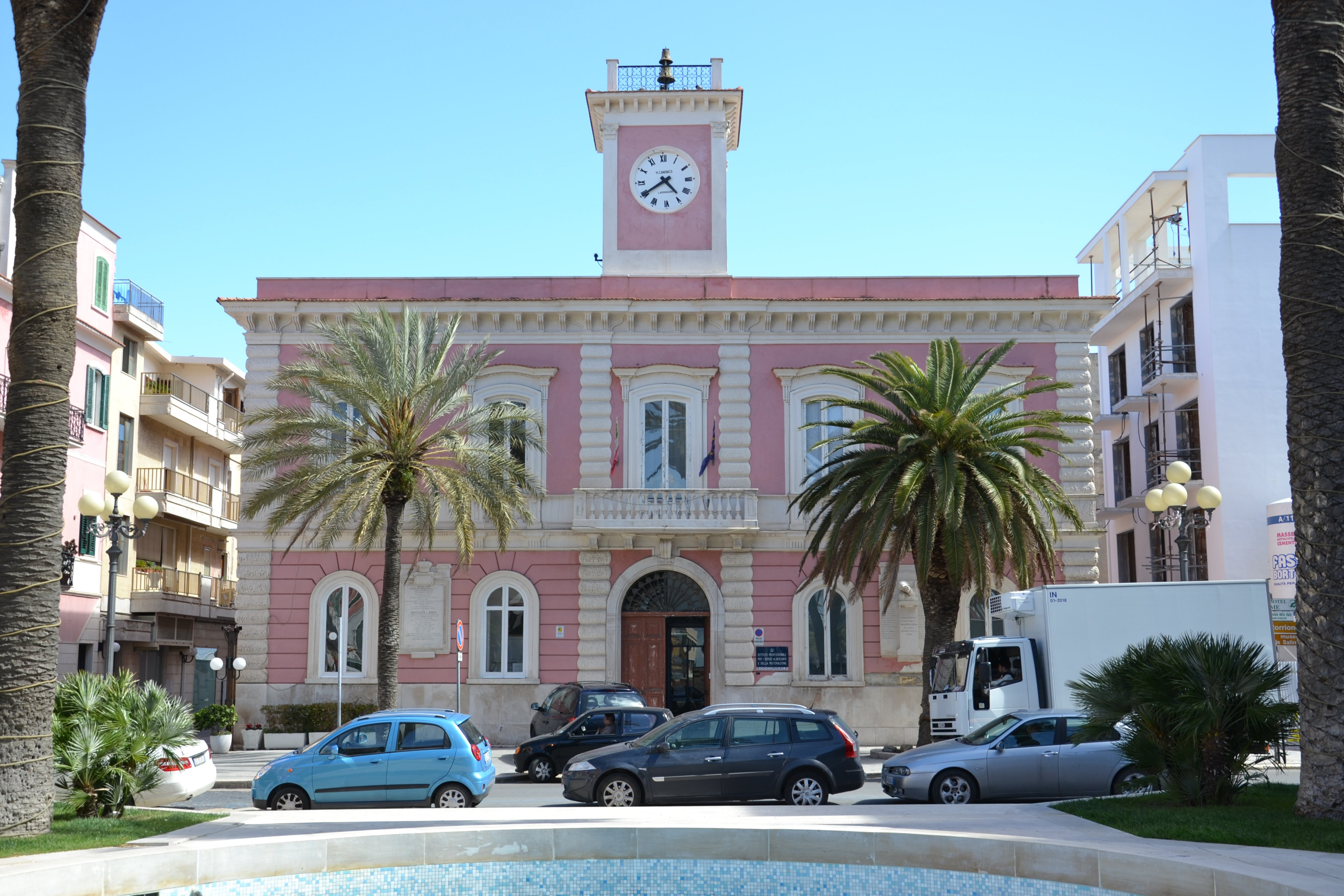

- Location within Italy Location within Apulia
- Coordinates: 41°22′N 16°9′E
- Country: Italy
- Region: Apulia
- Province: Barletta-Andria-Trani

Government
  - Mayor: Bernardo Lodispoto

Area
  - Total: 35.7 km^{2} (13.8 sq mi)
- Elevation: 1 m (3.3 ft)

Population (31 March 2018)
  - Total: 11,743
  - Density: 329/km^{2} (852/sq mi)
- Demonym: Margheritani or Salinari
- Time zone: UTC+1 (CET)
  - Summer (DST): UTC+2 (CEST)
- Postal code: ~~71044~~ 76016
- Dialing code: 0883
- Patron saint: San Salvatore, Maria Addolorata
- Saint day: August 6
- Website: Official website

Margherita di Savoia is a town and comune in the Province of Barletta-Andria-Trani (Apulia, southern Italy). It was given this name in 1879 in honour of Queen Margherita of Savoy, previously it had been known as Saline di Barletta.
