= Marzio Strassoldo =

Italian politician

Marzio Strassoldo di Graffembergo (December 23, 1939 – January 5, 2017) was the president of the Province of Udine (Italy). He was born in Gorizia. According to a poll of January 2008, he was the least popular president of all of the 105 provinces of Italy. He was forced to resign on 7 December 2007 after a motion of no confidence

== Electoral fraud ==
On September 27, 2007, an investigation by the newspaper Messaggero Veneto revealed a sale of a vote package from an independent list headed by Italo Tavoschi (420 votes) in exchange for a managerial position in the province of Udine.

The fact was denounced by Tavoschi himself, who reported Strassoldo to the police for not having respected the agreement, because he did not hire him after being confirmed president, and bringing as proof a contract signed by both parties:

February 20, 2006 - Italo Tavoschi commits to support prof. Strassoldo at the next provincial elections, and does so entering a list headed by Strassoldo, presenting himself in one or more constituencies of the city, or, according to the president's wish, in other constituencies of the territory. President Strassoldo commits to recognize Italo Tavoschi, for this personal descent into the field, in case of electoral victory and consequent confirmation as President of the Province of Udine, and administrative job, for the minimum duration of three years, possibly renewable.

For the first time in Italy, a case of vote sale was found to be proven by a written agreement. President Strassoldo, on October 1, 2007, declared that he would resign from his post, but on October 19 he withdrew his resignation. He was sentenced to 6 months and 20 days in prison in September 2009.
