= Province of Barletta-Andria-Trani =

Coordinates: 41°19′N 16°17′E

Province of Barletta-Andria-Trani Provincia di Barletta-Andria-Trani (Italian)
- Province
- Coat of arms

- Location of the province of Barletta-Andria-Trani in Italy
- Country: Italy
- Region: Apulia
- Capital(s): Barletta, Andria and Trani
- Municipalities: 10

Government
  - President: Bernardo Lodispoto (independent)

Area
  - Total: 1,542.95 km^{2} (595.74 sq mi)

Population (2026)
  - Total: 375,933
  - Density: 243.646/km^{2} (631.039/sq mi)

GDP
  - Total: €5.888 billion (2015)
  - Per capita: €14,946 (2015)
- Time zone: UTC+1 (CET)
  - Summer (DST): UTC+2 (CEST)
- Vehicle registration: BT

The province of Barletta-Andria-Trani (Italian: Provincia di Barletta-Andria-Trani, Neapolitan: Pruvincia 'e Barletta-Andria-Trani) is a province in the region of Apulia in Italy. The establishment of the province took effect in June 2009, and Andria was appointed as its seat of government on 21 May 2010.

It was created from 10 municipalities, which were formerly in the provinces of Bari and Foggia, taking its name from the three cities which share the new province's administrative functions. It has a population is 375,933 in an area of 1,542.95 square kilometres (595.74 sq mi).

== Municipalities ==
The province has 10 municipalities:

- Andria
- Barletta
- Bisceglie
- Canosa di Puglia
- Margherita di Savoia
- Minervino Murge
- San Ferdinando di Puglia
- Spinazzola
- Trani
- Trinitapoli

== Demographics ==
As of 2026, the population is 375,933, of which 49.5% are male, and 50.5% are female. Minors make up 15.3% of the population, and seniors make up 22.8%.

Historical population

Year	Pop.	±%
1861	148,566	—
1871	161,144	+8.5%
1881	182,777	+13.4%
1901	233,265	+27.6%
1911	249,146	+6.8%
1921	273,710	+9.9%
1931	257,865	−5.8%
1936	267,564	+3.8%

Year	Pop.	±%
1951	314,139	+17.4%
1961	323,133	+2.9%
1971	329,541	+2.0%
1981	347,860	+5.6%
1991	367,314	+5.6%
2001	383,018	+4.3%
2011	391,723	+2.3%
2021	380,616	−2.8%

Source: ISTAT

=== Immigration ===
As of 2025, immigrants make up 3.9% of the population. The 5 largest foreign countries of birth are Romania, Albania, Morocco, Germany, and Ukraine.

== Gallery ==
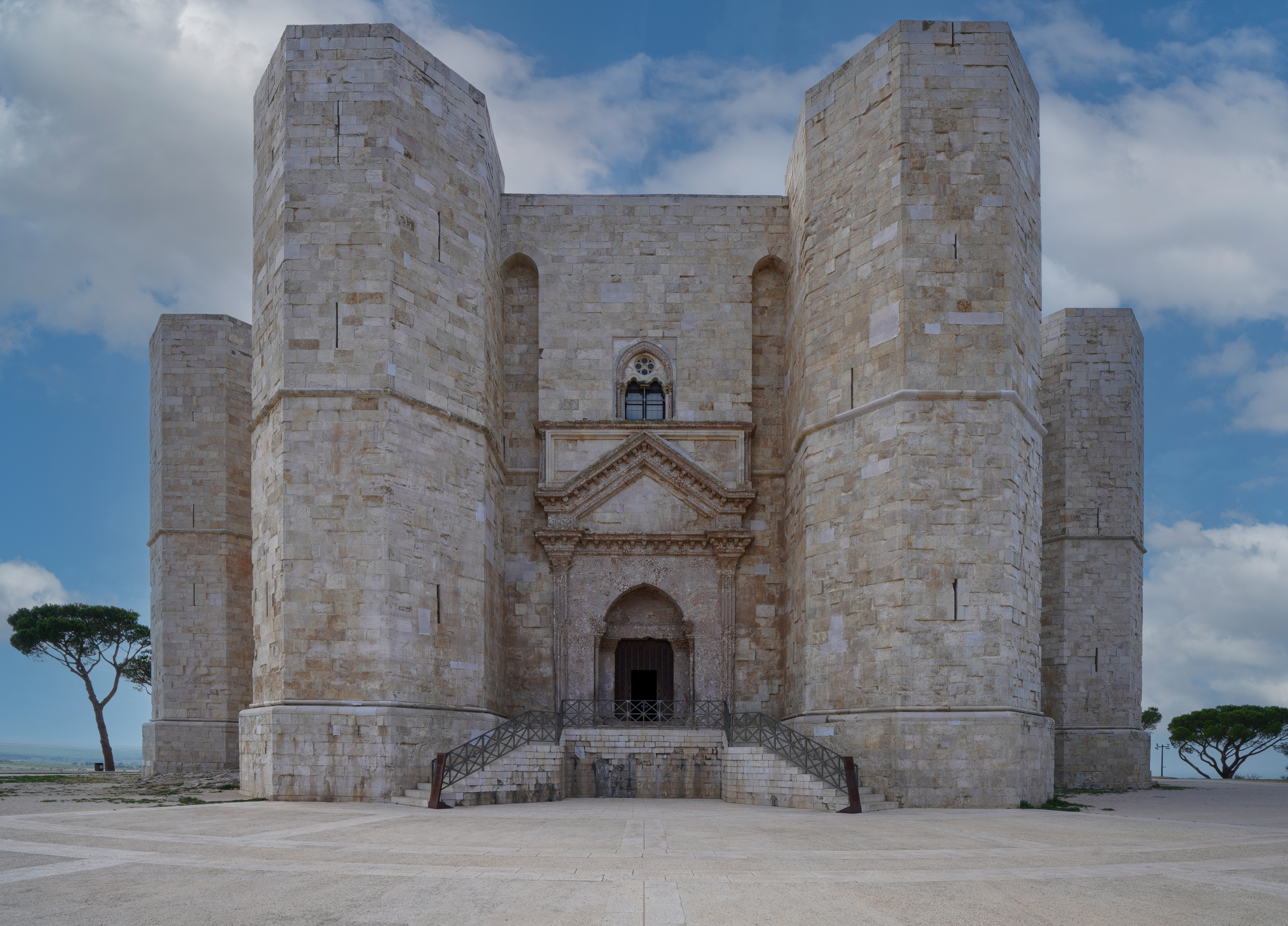
Castel del Monte

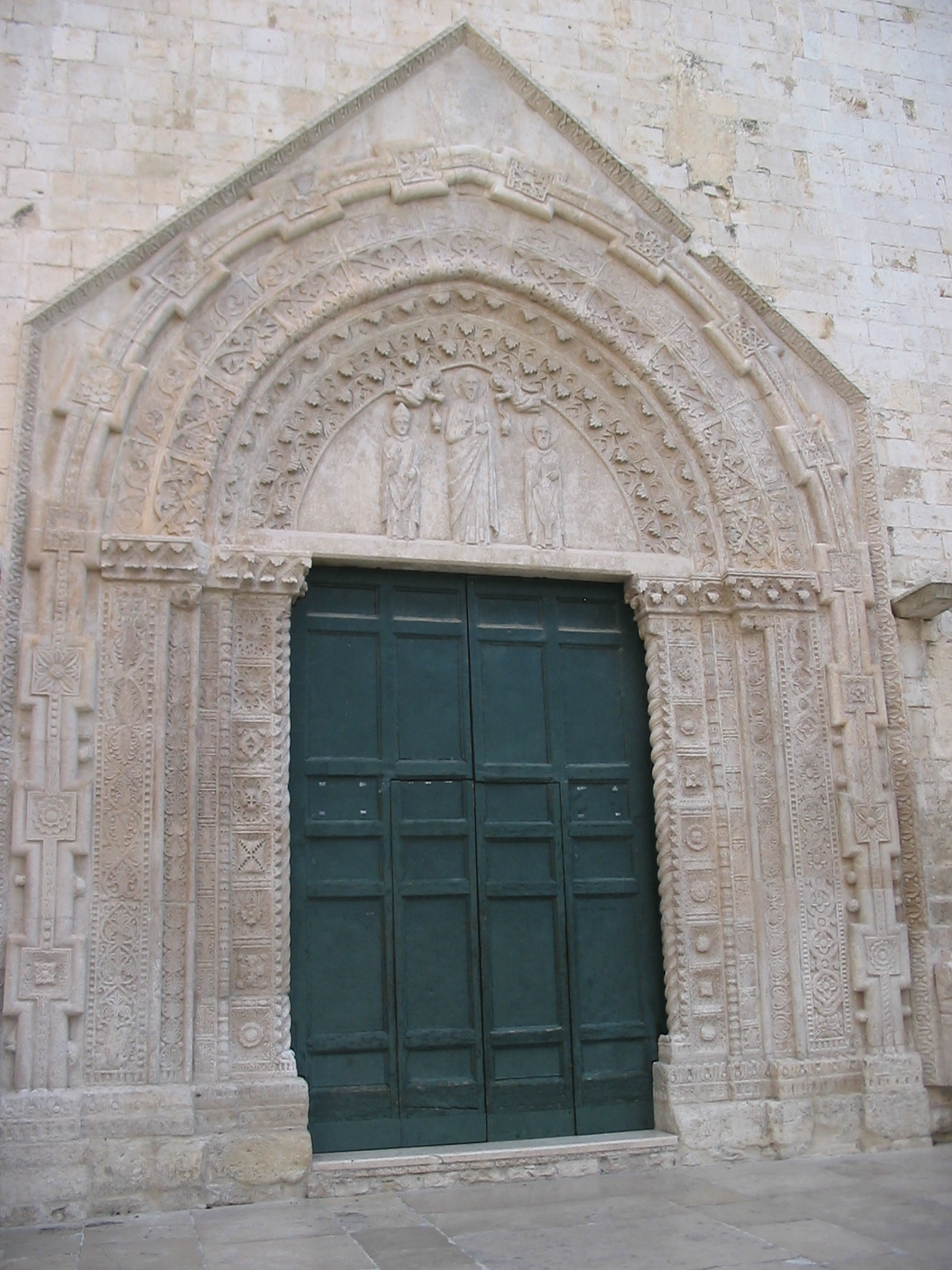
Sant'Agostino, Andria

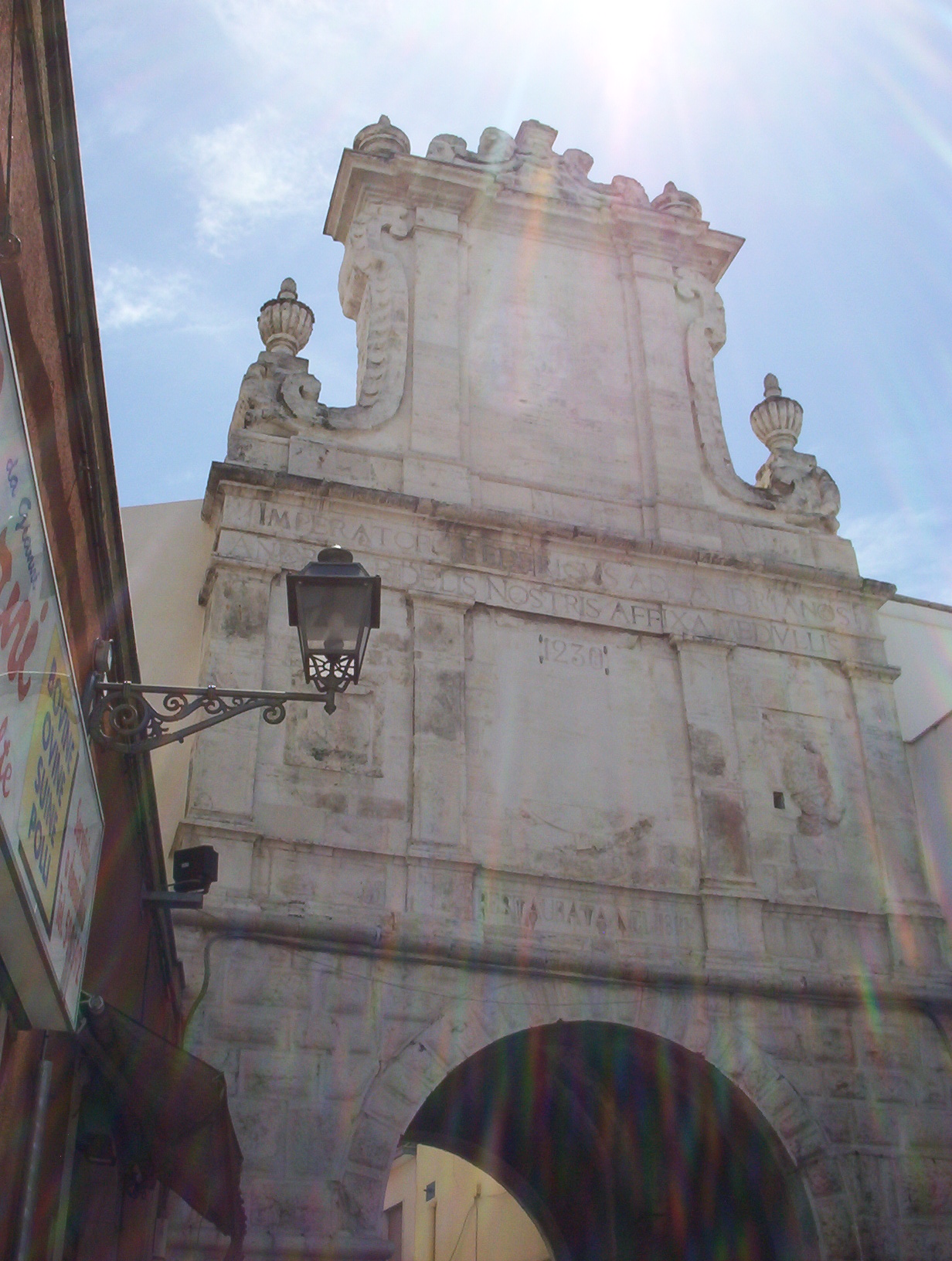
Porta Sant'Andrea, Andria

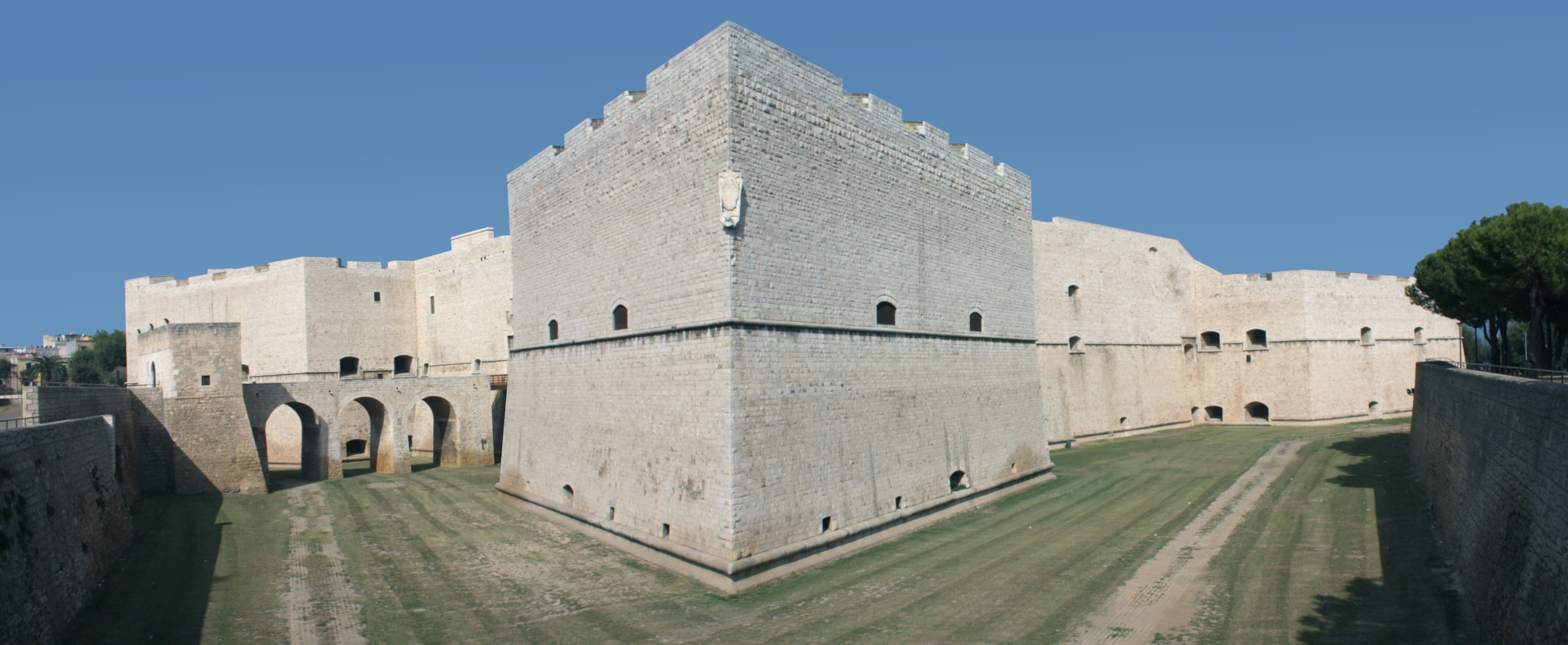
Barletta Castle

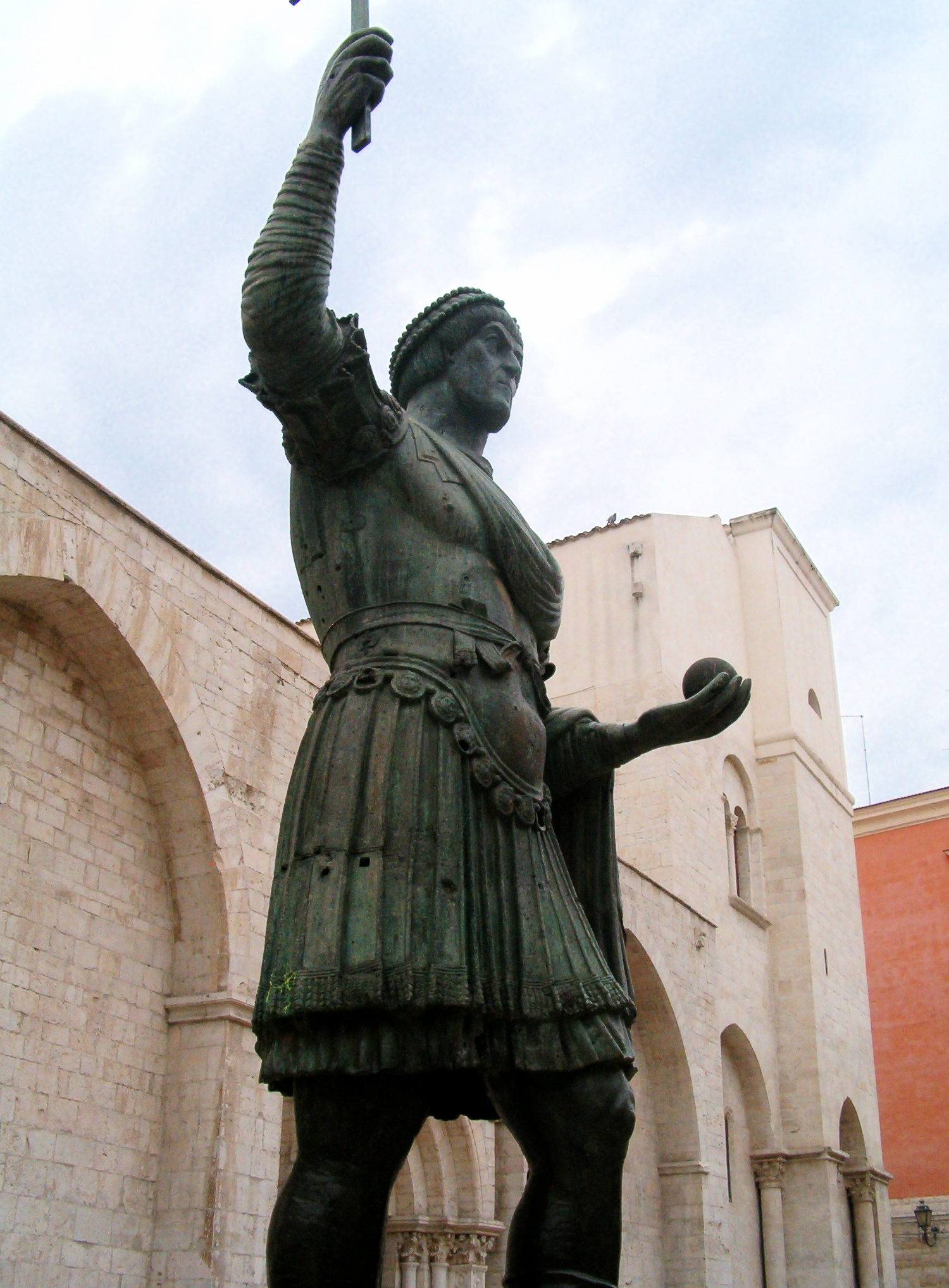
Colossus of Barletta

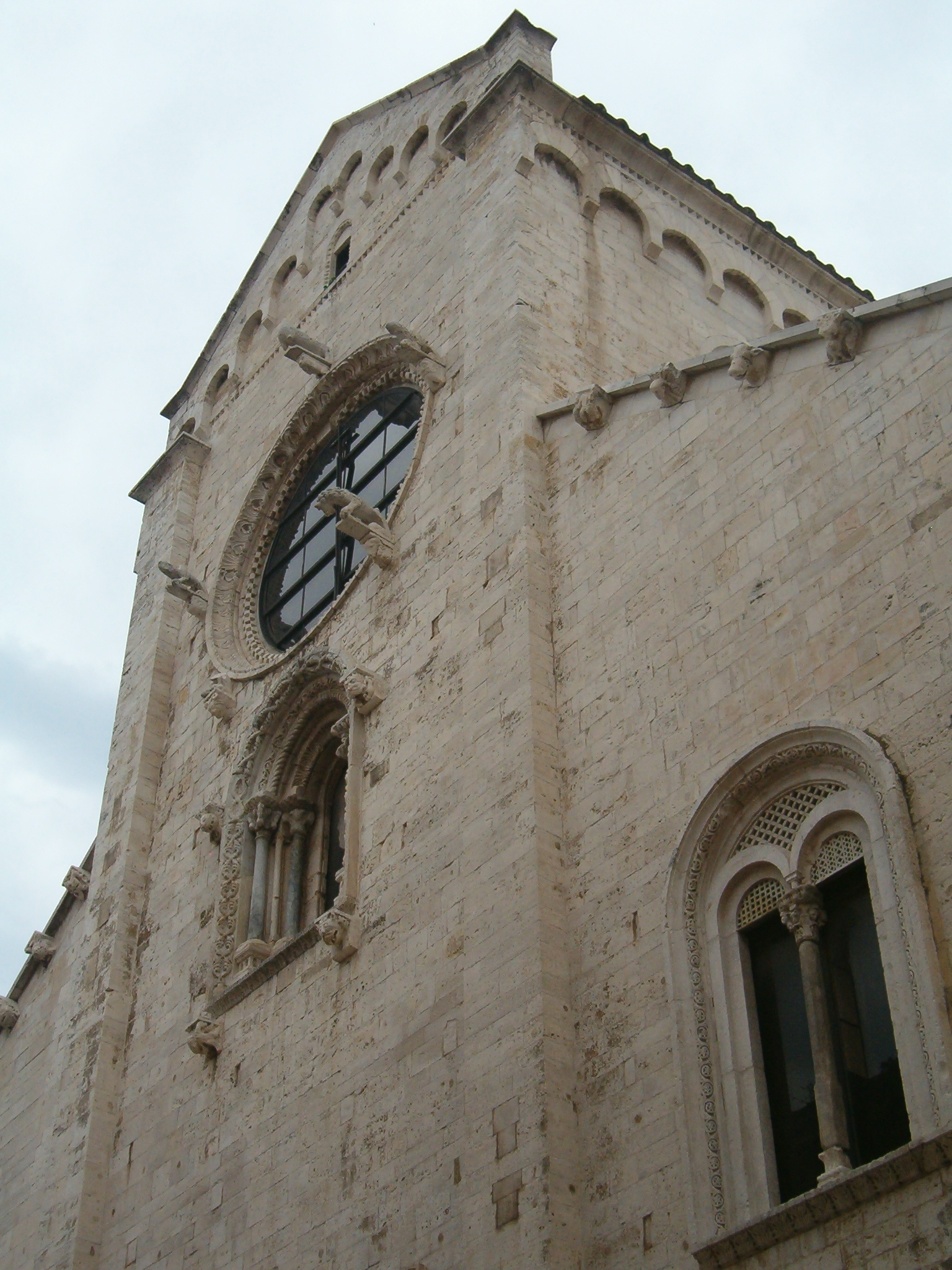
Barletta Cathedral

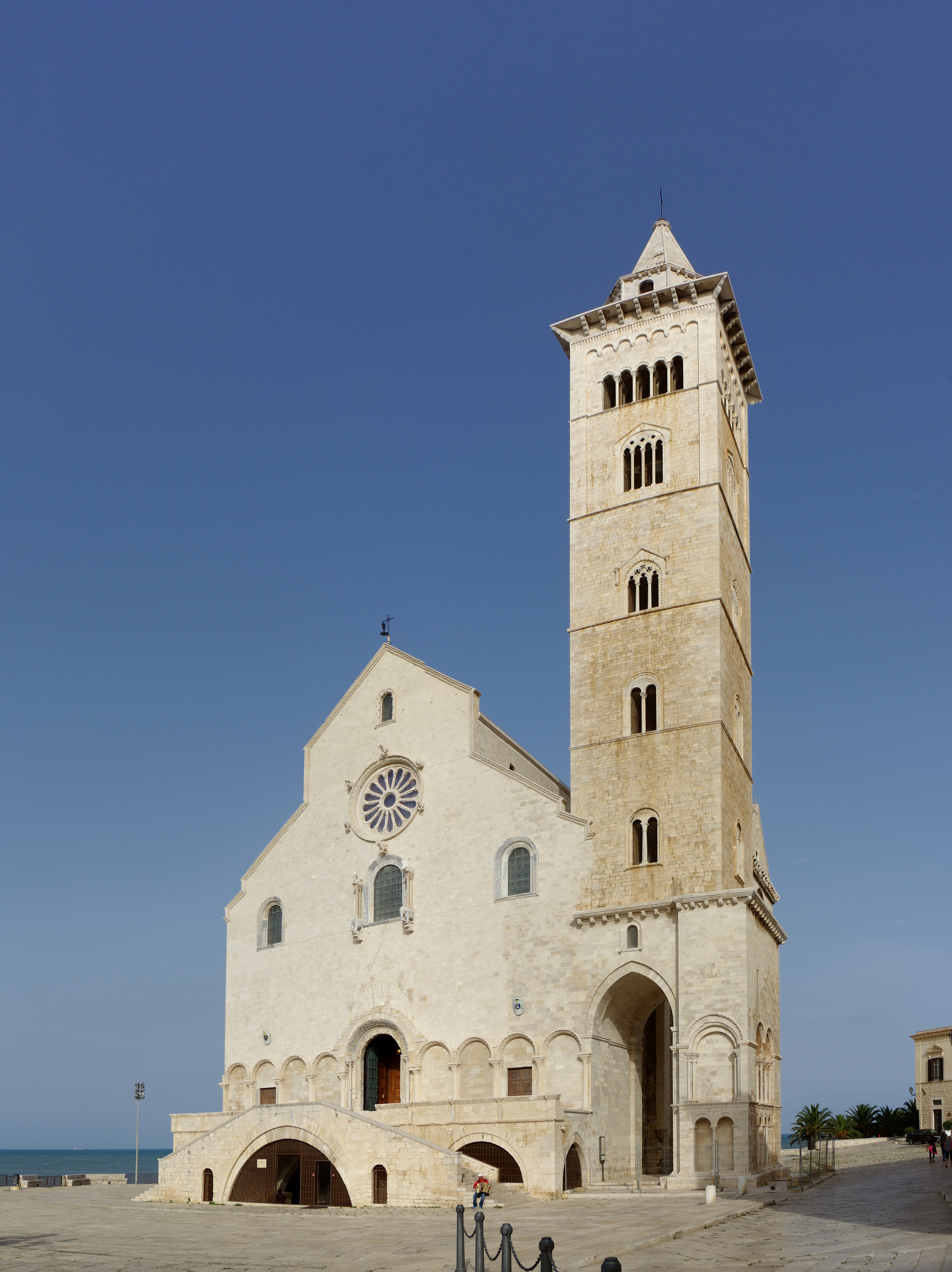
Trani Cathedral

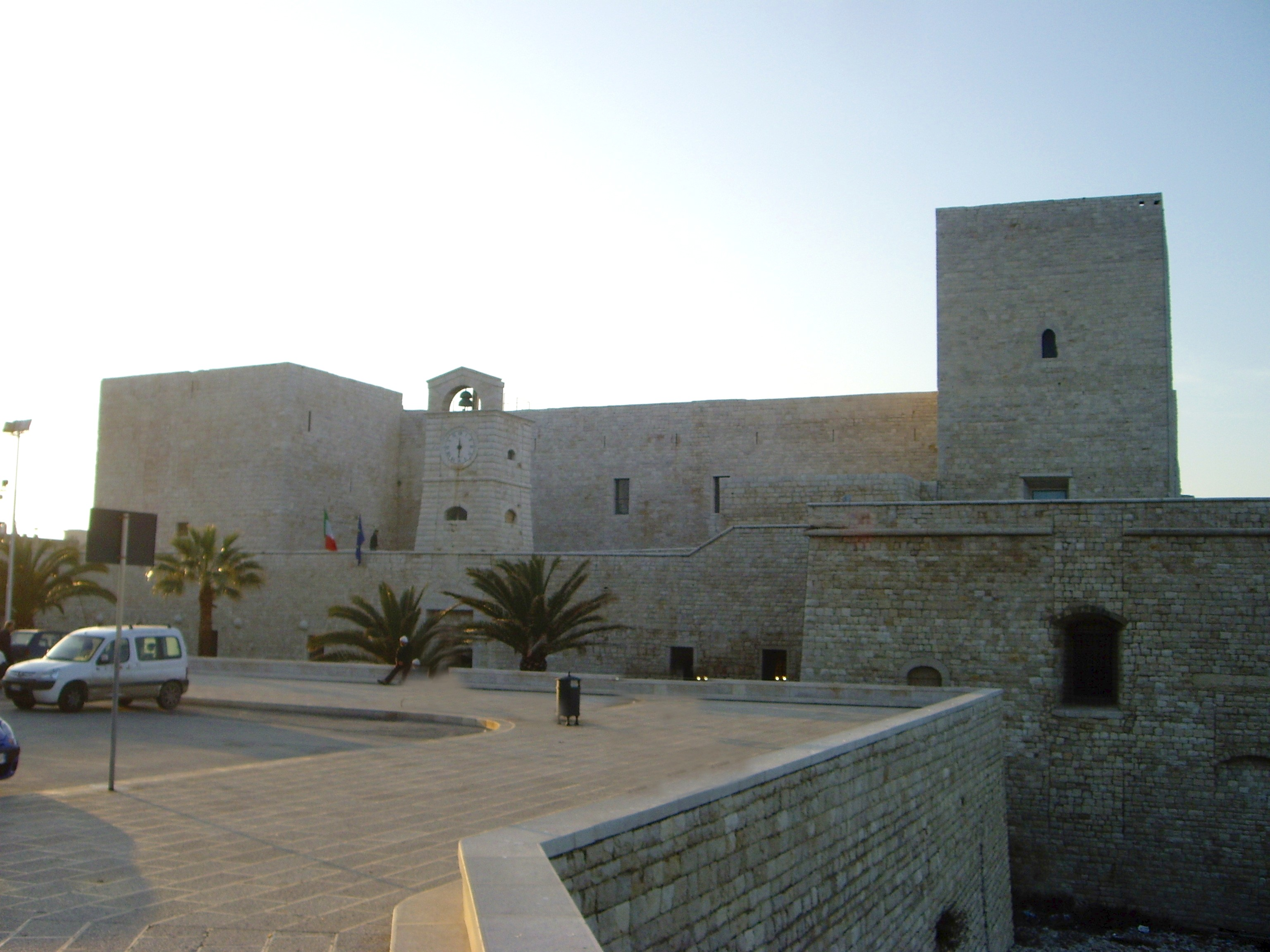
Trani, Apulia Castle

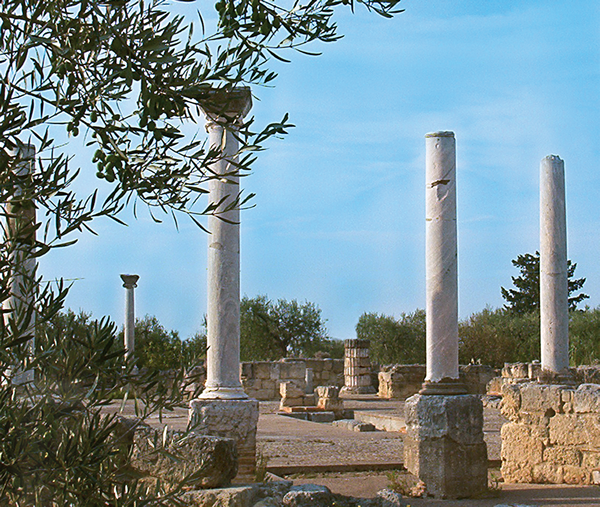
Remains of the San Leucio Basilica in Canosa di Puglia

== See also ==
- Castle of Barletta
