= Undersecretary of State (Italian system) =

Member in the Italian government system

The Undersecretary of State, in the Italian legal system, is a member of the government with the function of assisting the minister and exercising the tasks that have been delegated to him. It falls into the second category and 17th order of the Italian order of precedence.

== History ==
The figure of the undersecretary of state was established in the Kingdom of Italy with the law of February 12, 1888, n. 5195 ("Crispina reform"), replacing the General Secretary. Although it is not expressly provided for by the Republican Constitution of 1948, the office has been conferred in all republican governments, up to, in recent years, a real proliferation of undersecretaries which has given rise to many criticisms. It is governed by art.10 of the law of 23 August 1988, n. 400 (Discipline of Government activity and order of the Presidency of the Council of Ministers).

== Appointment ==
The undersecretaries of state are appointed by decree of the President of Italy, on the proposal of the President of the Council of Ministers, in consultation with the minister whom the undersecretary is called to assist, after consulting the Council of Ministers. Before taking up their duties, they take an oath in the hands of the President of the Council of Ministers. Without prejudice to the political responsibility and political powers of the ministers, no more than ten undersecretaries can be assigned the title of Deputy Minister, if they are conferred powers relating to areas or projects within the competence of one or more departmental structures or more general directorates. In this case the delegation, conferred by the competent minister, is approved by the Council of Ministers, on the proposal of the President of the council.

The law 24 December 2007, n. 244 (financial law for 2008) provides in art. 1, paragraph 376 that, starting from the XVI Legislature, the total number of government members, including ministers without portfolios, deputy ministers and undersecretaries of state, cannot exceed 65. Since this is a standard of ordinary and non-constitutional law, it should be kept in mind that it can always be modified with another law or act having the force of law. The undersecretaries of state can be chosen among the members of Parliament, as is usually the case, but also considering candidates that are not Parliament members. After the appointment they can stay members of a chamber (or can be elected to be a part of it), since no incompatibility is foreseen in this regard.

== Functions ==
The undersecretaries of state assist a minister or the Prime Minister and exercise the tasks delegated to them by ministerial decree (or by the Prime Minister) published in the Official Gazette. The undersecretaries of state can intervene, as representatives of the Government, at the sessions of the Parliamentary Chambers and Commissions, support the discussion in accordance with the directives of the minister and answer questions and interpellations.

The deputy ministers may be invited by the President of the Council of Ministers, in agreement with the competent Minister, to participate in the sessions of the Council of Ministers, without the right to vote, to report on topics and issues pertaining to the matter delegated to them. The undersecretaries do not participate in the meetings of the Council of Ministers, except for one of the undersecretaries to the Presidency of the Council who is attributed in the decree of appointment the functions of Secretary of the Council of Ministers who, according to art. 4 of the law n. 400/1988, takes care of the minutes and the conservation of the register of resolutions.
