= Norman-Hohenstaufen Castle (Sannicandro di Bari) =

Building in Sannicandro di Bari, Italy

Coordinates: 40.99982°N 16.798482°E

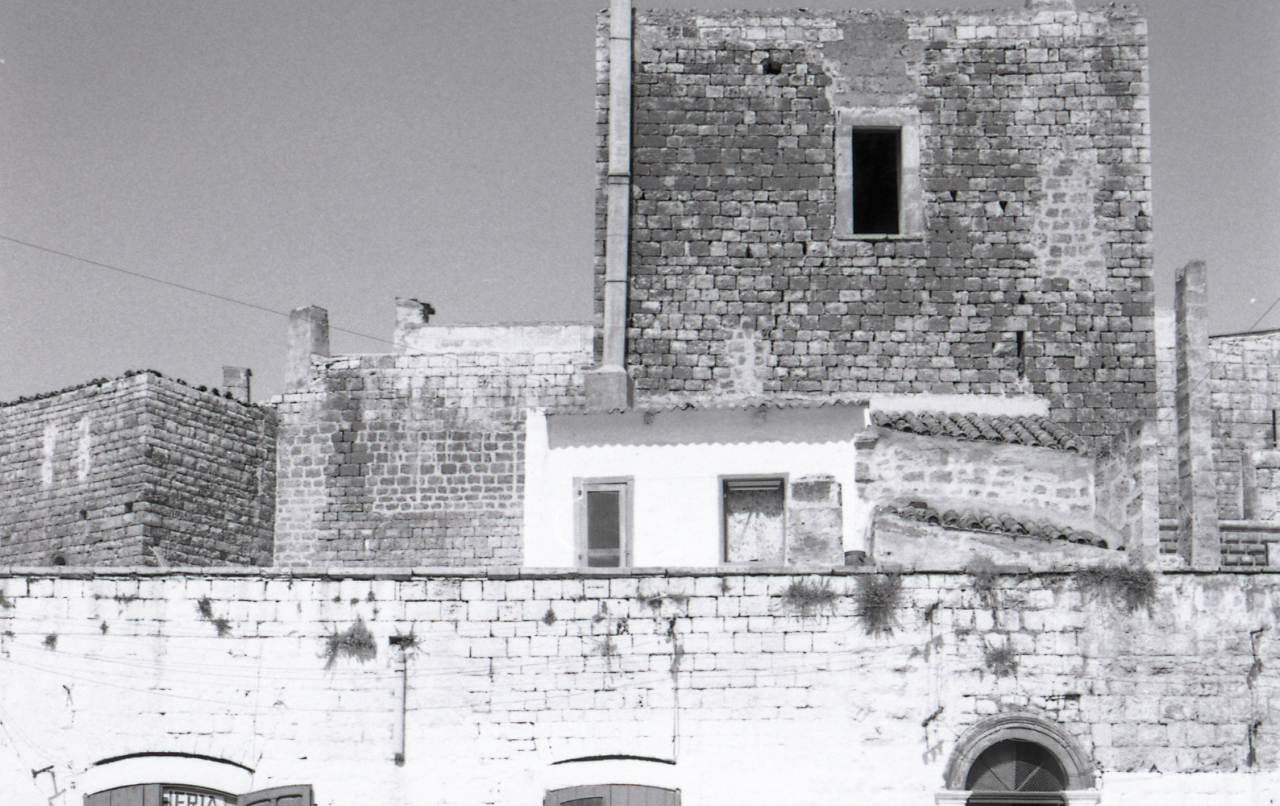
Photo by Paolo Monti, 1970.

The Norman-Hohenstaufen Castle is a medieval building in Sannicandro di Bari, in Southern Italy. It is located in the medieval part of town, between the characteristics houses with external staircases, surrounded by a moat, filled and turned into a street in 1836. It is composed of two distinct parts, put into each other, built in separate periods by the Byzantines and the Hohenstaufens. Its construction dates back to 916, the initiative of the Byzantine general Niccolò Piccingli, who had ordered the construction of a fortress for the defence of Apulia against the Saracens. It was located north of the small township of Sannicandro that, just in a century and a half, developed at the edge of the ruins of the ancient castle Mezardo. The original core of the castle, of Byzantine origin, consists of a sturdy brick wall of stone that runs along the trapezoidal layout, equipped with six four-sided towers distributed in the four vertices and the midpoint of the two bases of the trapezoid.

== History ==
=== Norman period ===
In 1071, after three years of siege, Bari fell into the hands of the Norman Robert Guiscard, Duke of Apulia, and Sannicandro was proclaimed Barony and part of the County of Montescaglioso. The Castle of Sannicandro was at this point completely restored with Norman architecture. The four corner towers were rebuilt on the Byzantine ruins and connected by a solid curtain to four central towers. Eastward a wide moat and a drawbridge were built alongside the main tower, isolating and protecting the castle. The baronial palace was built behind the north curtain, with a rescue tunnel leading to the church of S. John outside the walls, built by the Normans themselves. When, finally, in 1087, the sacred relics of Saint Nicholas arrived in Bari, in the Castle was built a chapel dedicated to the saint.

The last Norman Baron was William De Tot, who ruled the fief of Sannicandro presumably between 1150 and 1170, after a brief period, between 1131 and 1134, during which the barony was held by Count Guido da Venosa.

=== Hohenstaufen period ===
Evidence of the events that took place during the years of Hohenstaufen domination in southern Italy is lacking. The policy of centralization of power begun by Emperor Frederick II of Hohenstaufen and his intolerance towards the barons suggest that in that period the house of Sannicandro was not granted to any feudal lord.

In 1242 original Byzantine structure was completed by the Houhenstaufen emperor, who added the outside section in order to transform it into a fortified residential castle. An outer wall, 1.58 meters wide, surrounded, in fact, the perimeter of the manor, which was protected by a new moat. The north central Norman tower was demolished to allow the building of the great baronial palace, with three large mullioned windows, flanked and guarded by two massive towers. Into the wall, next to one of the towers, were hidden spaces for falconry, inaccessible and devoid of light, as the emperor had prescribed in his treatise De arte venandi cum avibus. Finally a rescue tunnel was built, which reached the open countryside to Bitetto.

During the years of Hohenstaufen domination the castle consisted of nine towers.

=== Angevin period ===
The advent of the Angevin domination was decisive for the history of the country. It is said that Prince Charles I of Anjou, imprisoned in Sicily, had asked for the protection of St. Nicholas of Bari, who, appearing, would have secured his release. After being freed and taking over the throne in Naples, Charles II of Anjou wanted to remunerate the shrine of the saint, whose intercession he attributed its salvation, with broad incomes and the richest gifts. In 1304, by permission of the Angevin kings, the fief of Sannicandro passed, therefore, to the Basilica of Saint Nicholas of Bari and began a period of relative stability.

In those years, the castle was never occupied by Prior-Baron because they resided at the Royal Court of Naples. Was therefore used as a seat for the farm administration of the Barony and in some ground floor rooms were planted a grain mill and an oil mill.

The authority of the Prior-Barons of the Chapter of St. Nicholas of Bari lasted five centuries, until 1806, when the law of King Joseph Bonaparte that abolished the feudal system was issued.

The feud was, therefore, subject to a common private property and the Chapter of the Real Chapter of Saint Nicholas came in the role of a simple user of real property.

=== Modern period ===
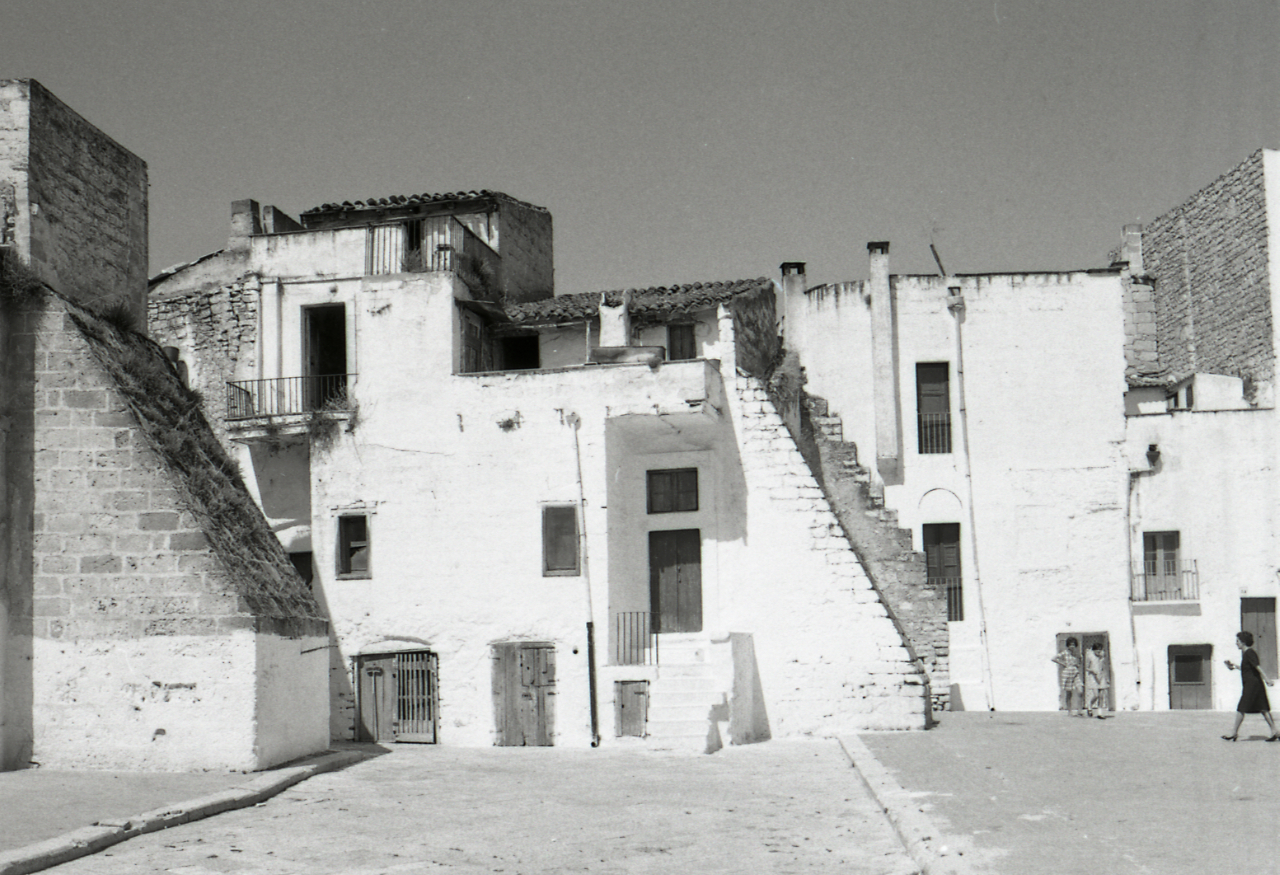
Houses inside the walls photographed by Paolo Monti in 1970

The castle, which during the years of administration by the Basilica had maintained its original lines, lived a period of decay between 1806 and 1875. In fact, it emerged the problem of filling the void produced by the loss of feudal rights, and finding new sources of revenue for the maintenance of the Basilica of San Nicola and the Chapter. Therefore, the outer ring was opened with more doors and gates to obtain windows to be used as workshops, houses, barns and shops that provide income to the Nicholas Chapter. The gap was bridged, the tunnel blocked, the mullioned windows were defaced and turned into balconies. In 1951, the title passed by from the Prior of St. Nicholas of Bari to the Archbishop of Bari, and, with a public act of the 12 December 1967, the Municipality of Sannicandro di Bari bought the castle for the sum of 10,500,000 lire.
