= Spaghetti all'assassina =

Italian pasta dish

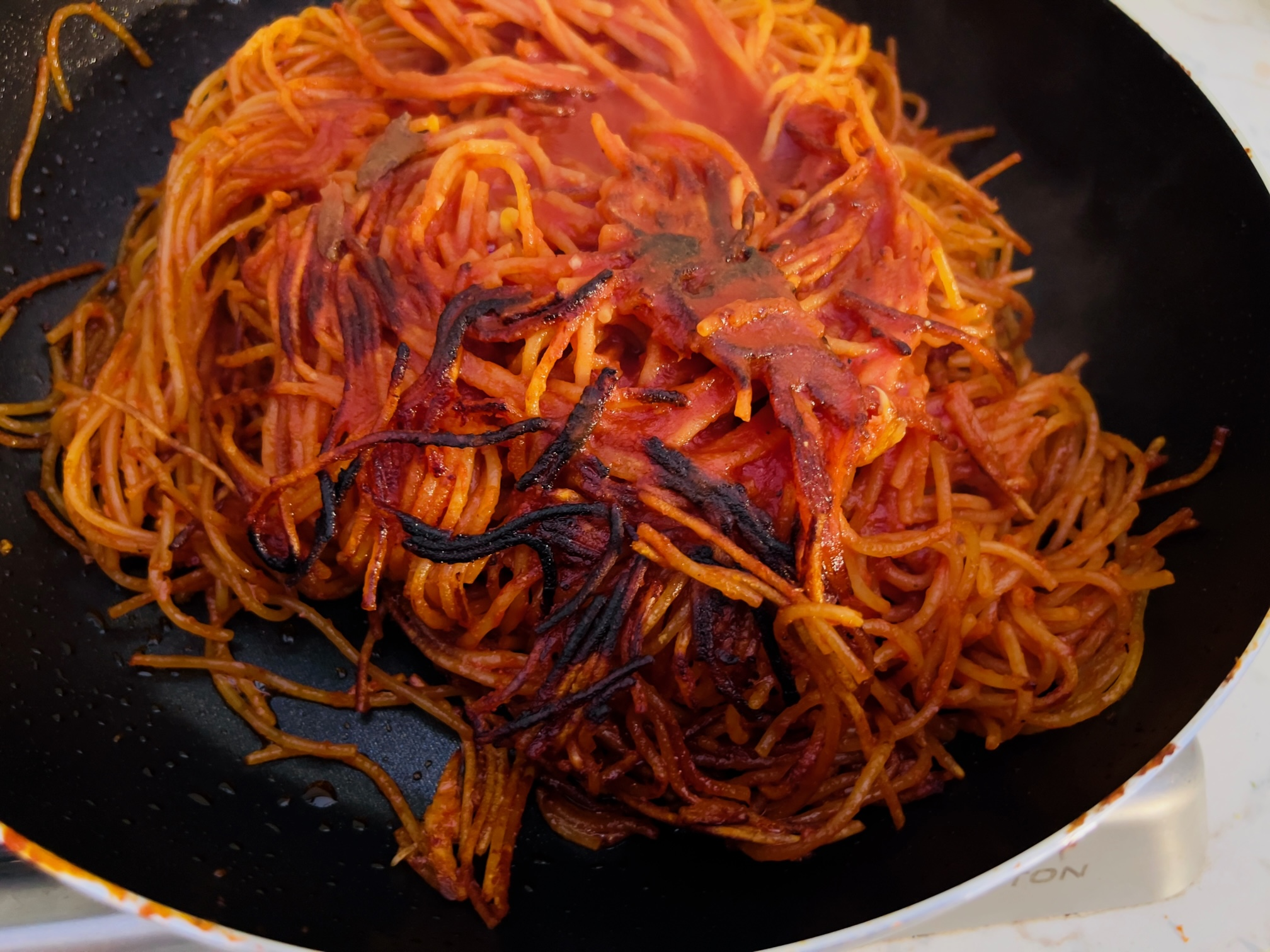
- Course: Primo (Italian course)
- Place of origin: Bari, Apulia, Italy
- Created by: Enzo Francavilla
- Invented: 1967
- Main ingredients: Spaghetti, garlic, olive oil, tomato sauce, chili pepper

Spaghetti all'assassina (Italian: [spaˈɡetti allassasˈsiːna]; lit. 'assassin's manner spaghetti'), also known as spaghetti bruciati (Italian: [spaˈɡetti bruˈtʃaːti]; lit. 'burnt spaghetti'), is a spaghetti dish. Instead of being boiled, the spaghetti is cooked directly in the pan (traditionally cast iron). A broth typically made of tomato sauce diluted with water is gradually added as the pasta absorbs it, similar to a risotto. As the spaghetti absorbs the sauce, it cooks directly on the pan surface, developing significant browning and a distinctive, crispy texture unique among pasta dishes.

== History ==
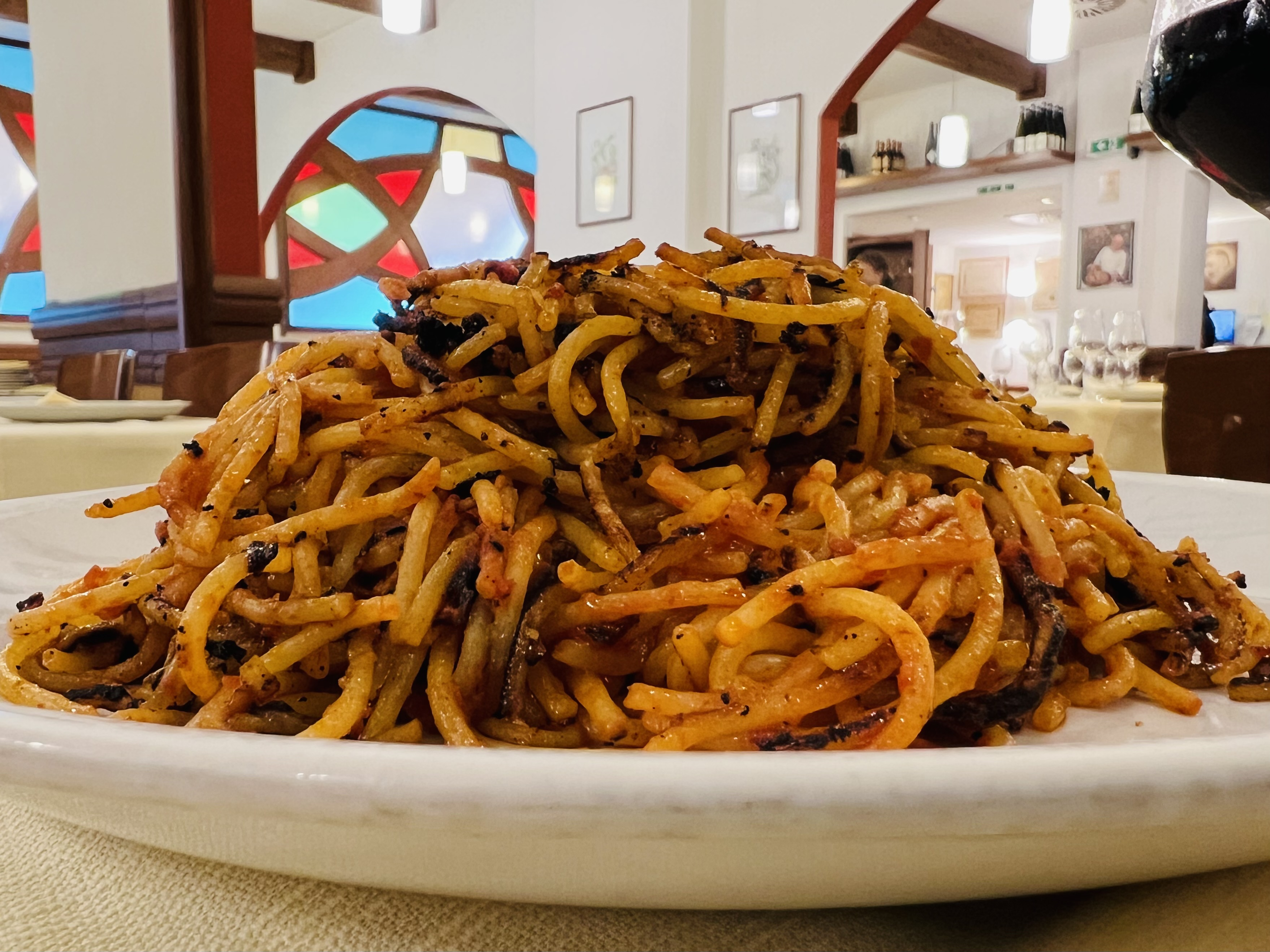
Spaghetti all'assassina served at the Al Sorso Preferito restaurant in Bari, Apulia, where it is said to have originated

The debut of spaghetti all'assassina on restaurant menus most probably took place in the late 1960s and early 1970s. Some trace the original dish back to the Marc'Aurelio restaurant in the city centre of Bari, which eventually closed down. According to Felice Giovine, though, a historian of Apulian cuisine, spaghetti all'assassina originates from Al Sorso Preferito, a restaurant in the city centre of Bari, where it was created in 1967 by Foggian chef Enzo Francavilla at the request of two customers from Northern Italy. Due to its spiciness, they jokingly called Francavilla assassino ('murderer'), a word from which the name of the dish later derived. This is also the version of events favoured by the Accademia dell'Assassina, a group of culinary experts and enthusiasts founded in Bari in 2013 to protect against the diffusion of the recipe.

Spaghetti all'assassina was immediately successful and spread throughout the city, but in the 1980s it began to disappear. It was brought back into vogue in 2013 by the Accademia dell'Assassina, gaining popularity thanks to subsequent mentions in mass culture: notoriety mainly came from the episode Spaghetti all'assassina from the RAI series Lolita Lobosco (2021).

The dish has seen renewed interest in Italy due to the Mediterranean noir novels La casa nel bosco and Spaghetti all'assassina.

== Preparation ==
Spaghetti all'assassina is similar in preparation to pasta risottata (Italian: [ˈpasta rizotˈtaːta]), pasta prepared in the style of risotto, that is, cooked directly in broth. The broth used for spaghetti all'assassina typically consists of a 1:1 to 2:1 ratio of water and tomato sauce; less water is required if the tomato sauce is obtained by blending fresh tomatoes in a food processor. Unlike other pasta risottata dishes, the spaghetti is allowed to directly touch the surface of the pan before additional doses of the broth are added. This causes the spaghetti to fry and char, contributing to its crispy texture. Bronze-cut pasta is generally not recommended for spaghetti all'assassina, as it releases too much starch during cooking, interfering with its browning. Spaghetti all'assassina is often spicy: crushed red pepper, chili powder, or dried or fresh chili peppers are added to it during cooking or used as a garnish. Italian food writer Rachel Roddy writes that all'assassina must be "burnt, crispy and fiery".

== See also ==
- List of pasta
- List of pasta dishes
