= Sannicandro =

Sannicandro is the name of two towns in the south-east Italian region of Apulia, and of the municipalities named after them:

- Sannicandro di Bari, in the Province of Bari
- Sannicandro Garganico (today San Nicandro Garganico), in the Province of Foggia
