= Sannicandro di Bari =

Town and comune in Apulia, Italy

- Comune
- Comune di Sannicandro di Bari
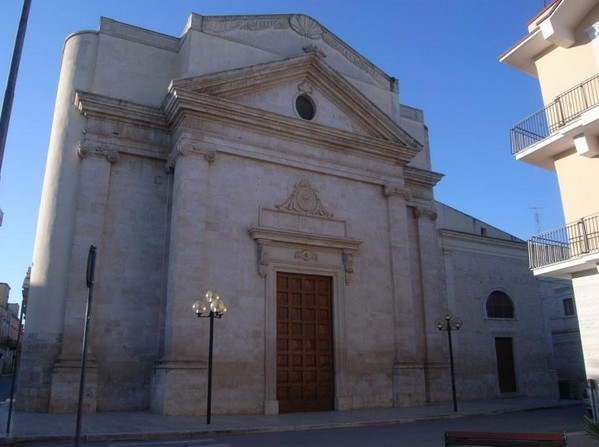
- Church of Maria Assunta

- Coat of arms

- Location within Italy Location within Apulia
- Coordinates: 41°0′N 16°48′E
- Country: Italy
- Region: Apulia
- Metropolitan city: Bari (BA)

Government
  - Mayor: Giuseppe Giannone

Area
  - Total: 56.79 km^{2} (21.93 sq mi)
- Elevation: 183 m (600 ft)

Population (30 June 2015)
  - Total: 9,982
  - Density: 175.8/km^{2} (455.2/sq mi)
- Demonym: Sannicandresi
- Time zone: UTC+1 (CET)
  - Summer (DST): UTC+2 (CEST)
- Postal code: 70028
- Dialing code: 080
- Patron saint: St. Joseph
- Saint day: March 19
- Website: Official website

Sannicandro di Bari (Barese: Sannecàndre) is a town and comune in the Metropolitan City of Bari, Apulia, southern Italy.

== Main sights ==
The main attraction of Sannicandro is the Hohenstaufen-Norman castle, located in the centre of the city. It is composed of two structures one within the other: the first one was built by the Byzantines in 916, with a line of walls in stone with six quadrangular towers. After the Norman conquest of Bari in 1071, the castle was restored. During the reign in Sicily of Frederick II, Holy Roman Emperor (1198-1250), the structure was adapted for use as a castle.

Other sights include:

- Church of Santa Maria Assunta
- Monumento ai caduti

== Notable people ==
- Francesco Racanelli (1904–1978), doctor, pranotherapist and writer
- Domenico Losurdo (1941–2018), historian, essayist, Marxist philosopher, and communist politician
