= Mario Nuzzolese =

Italian entertainment journalist (1915–2008)

- Born: 10 December 1915; Bari, Italy
- Died: 21 October 2008 (aged 92); Bari, Italy
- Occupations: Journalist, AGIS Co-Founder
- Spouse: Teresa Bellomo (1945–2008)
- Children: Vinia (1945–1963); Vincenzo (born 1947)

Mario Nuzzolese OMRI (10 December 1915 – 21 October 2008), was an influential Italian figure who distinguished himself as a Lieutenant Colonel, educator, journalist, and film critic. He played a pivotal role in shaping the Italian cinema and entertainment industry. Over his career, Nuzzolese made significant contributions to the National AGIS Association, where he was instrumental in its management and development. He also led its Regional Delegation for over four decades, leaving a lasting impact on the industry.

== Military career ==
In 1942 he was sent with the rank of Lieutenant Colonel to defend the Italian trenches during World War II in the Africa Campaign on the El Alamein front, recruited by the Military Intelligence commanded by the Major Paolo Caccia Dominioni. During a battle he had a lucky landing in the Sahara Desert with his Fiat Cicogna that caused severe and irreversible vertebral injuries.

For the strategy, courage and seriousness he was awarded a Medal of Military Valor.

== Cinema ==
In 1945 he started projecting silent movies in a little room of the School Balilla in Bari, allowing his students to explore the educational power of videos with his first censures. During the early 1950s, in Bari, Nuzzolese directed the first B/W documentary on the Basilica di San Nicola of Bari, actually the property of the historical RAI Archives. He devoted his life to the family and the cinema culture, ideated and founded Cinemas ABC (1976), one of the first essay cinemas in Europe inaugurated by Minister Adolfo Sarti with the movie "Quanto è bello lu murire acciso" of Ennio Lorenzini. The Centre of Culture liked too much also the Italian Film Director Carlo Lizzani, which permitted to print of 11 movies of the Venice Film Festival. It was reopened on 19 January 2010, after restoration and conservation interventions, with an honour plate to him dedicated. He participated several times in the Annual Academy Awards, Festival de Cannes and Venice Film Festival. He founded associations to improve Italian Cinema's traditions and the target of its supporters, such as Agiscuola and FICE. In 1980 he was awarded by the former President of the Council of Ministers, Francesco Cossiga, with the title of Commendatore della Repubblica and different times by the AGIS Association with several medals of honours for his loyalty, fidelity and positive results. He collected original 8mm films, VHS, movie billboards and specialised magazines, creating the invaluable AGIS collection.

== Journalism ==
He wrote several articles and film criticisms for the newspapers Corriere della Sera, Repubblica and Giornale dello Spettacolo; and socially divulged the essay cinema culture in television format.

== Honours ==
- Commander of the Order of Merit of the Italian Republic
- Bronze Medal of Military Valor
