= Palazzo Mincuzzi =

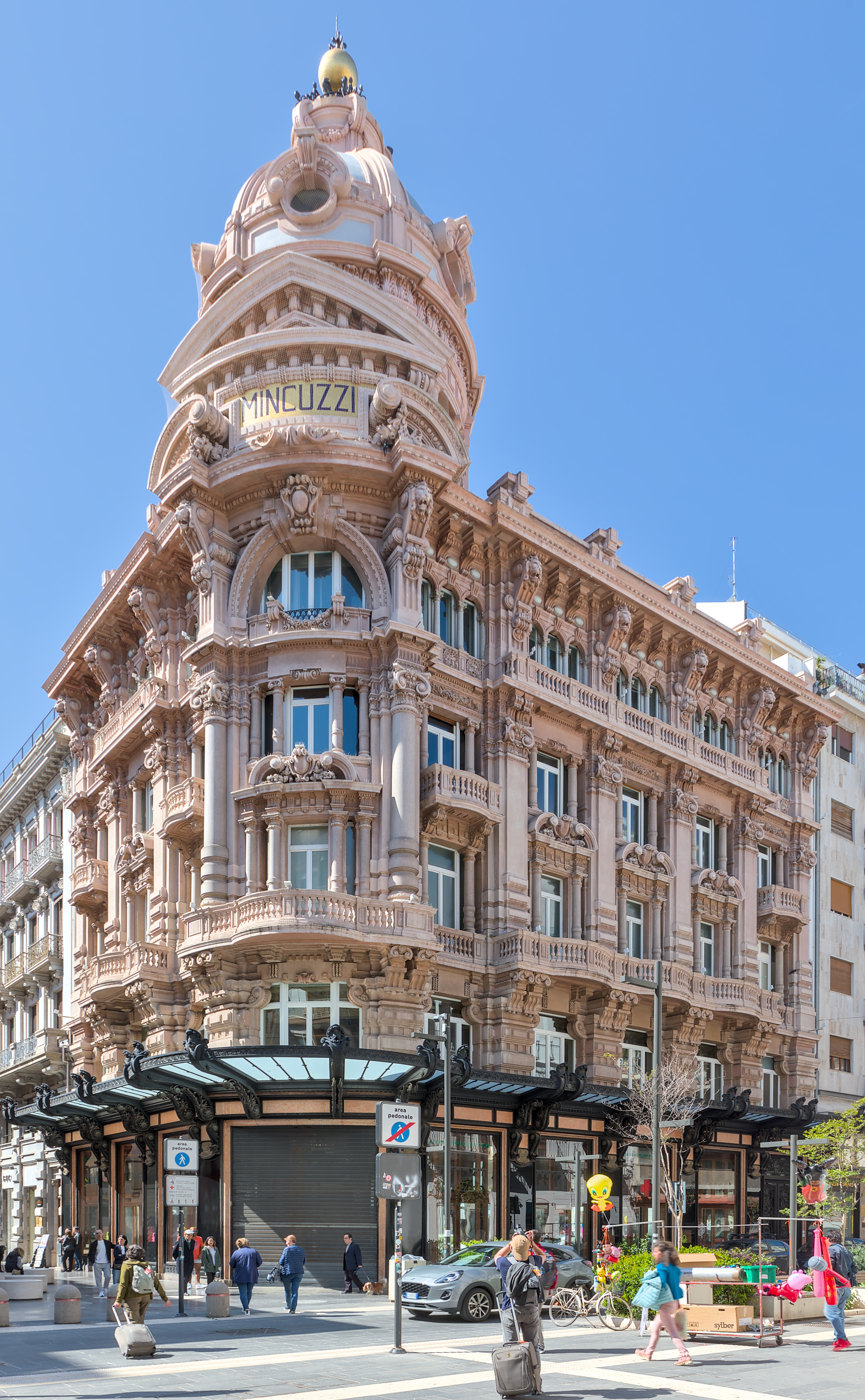
- Palazzo Mincuzzi in Bari
- Click on the map for a fullscreen view

General information
- Architectural style: Eclectic
- Location: Bari, Italy
- Coordinates: 41°07′23.6″N 16°52′9.8″E

Palazzo Mincuzzi is a historic building situated in Bari, Italy.

== History ==
The building, built between 1926 and 1928, was designed by architect Aldo Forcignanò and by engineer Gaetano Palmiotto. It was commissioned by the Mincuzzi family, who owned the department store of the same name, to house their business. The inauguration of the building took place on October 28, 1928 with the participation of the local authorities and many residents. It quickly rose as a symbol of commerce in Bari.

== Description ==
The building is a typical example of early 20th century commercial architecture. It features a late eclectic style, and is characterized by exuberant ornamentation and a corner dome.
