= Giovanni Pietro Gallo =

Italian composer

Giovanni Pietro Gallo (fl. 1591 – c. 1600) was an Italian composer. Not much is known about Gallo. A native of Bari, his year of birth is not known. He was mostly likely trained by Giovanni de Marinis, maestro di cappella of the Bari Cathedral. Gallo's anthology Primo libro de madrigali was published in 1597 and includes music by Marinis as well as himself and Flaminio Tresti. One of his pieces is published in Marinis's 1596 anthology Primo libro de madrigali a sei voci. He also has a work published in the earlier 1591 anthology Compendium musicae which was compiled by Adam Gumpelzhaimer. Gallo's 1600 anthology, Motectorum liber primus, contained 25 vocal works by the composer, but only the title page survives. After this nothing is known about Gallo.
