= Nico Perrone =

Italian essayist, historian and journalist (1935–2026)

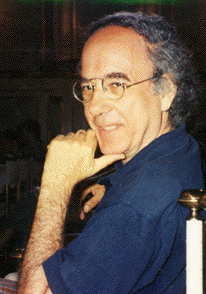
- Born: 27 April 1935; Bari, Apulia, Italy
- Died: 19 September 2026 (aged 91)
- Citizenship: Italy
- Occupations: Essayist, historian, journalist
- Writing career
- Language: Italian

Nico Perrone (27 April 1935 – 19 September 2026) was an Italian essayist, historian, and journalist. He firstly discovered papers on the plot for killing Enrico Mattei, the Italian state tycoon for oil in the 1950s.

Perrone was the author of twenty books, and some fifty shorter essays published in Italy, Denmark, and the USA. He was also the author of approximately a thousand leading articles and other contributions to Italian and Swiss newspapers.

== Life and career ==
Born Nicola Carlo Perrone in Bari, the only son of Raffaele and Luisa Tortorella. His father was an Arditi volunteer during World War I and then a mass leader. Other relatives had strong national sentiments. In his family heritage, a Garibaldi's volunteer and a Jacobin priest were executed after he participated in the 1799 revolution.

After World War II, due to a crisis of public schools, Perrone attended for two years a Jesuit priest's school, standing on the laical position of his parents but appreciating that severe and sophisticated method of teaching. Then he graduated in Diplomatic History, and held scholarships for the University College Dublin (Ireland) and Sofiyski Universitet (Sofia University, Bulgaria).

He was charged to study foreign labour laws for ENI, the Italian state oil holding (1961), in Rome. ENI president, Enrico Mattei, appointed him as an observer with the Italian Ministry for the Public Administration Reform; later he worked with a publisher in Bari. Invited in USA with the International Visitor Leadership Program, he received the honorary citizenship of the State of Nebraska (1986).

Perrone was the co-editor for the Italian monthlies Storia in Rete (2005-2026), and Giano (2003-2007), and Associate Professor of Contemporary History and American History at the University of Bari; he was director of the Institute of Modern and Contemporary History (1988-90, 1991-94) and professor for the European Union European Module in Social and Economic History of European Integration (1994–97).

He was visiting professor in Denmark (Roskilde University, since 1991 - Copenhagen Business School, 1992, 1993 - University of Copenhagen, 2003), in Switzerland (Roskilde University master at Lugano, 1998, 2000), in Albania (Universiteti Zoja e Këshillit Të Mirë, Tirana, 2008), and in the US (Foreign Policy Research Institute, 1983). He was sometimes a host professor at the University of Padua, Italy (1981, 1989).

Perrone was a founder member, vice president (1995–96), and member of the board (1991–98) for the EU European Education Programme on Society-Science & Technology, Louvain-la-Neuve, Belgium (master Society, Science & Technology in Europe). He was a member of the advisory board for the Federico Caffè Centre at Roskilde University. He held the position of Bari University Rector's delegate for Denmark (2002-2006). He was awarded the Bari University Silver medal in 2006.

From 1982 to his death in 2026, Perrone was a contributor for RAI, the Italian state broadcasting company. He contributed to several newspapers in Italy and Switzerland (from 1971), and was a contributor for the Westdeutscher Rundfunk (Cologne, Germany, 2001) and the Italian edition of Monthly Review.

Nico Perrone died on 19 September 2026, at the age of 91.

== Books ==
- 1980 (in Italian) America, series editor
- 1989. (in Italian) Mattei il nemico italiano. Politica e morte del presidente dell'ENI attraverso i documenti segreti (Mattei, the Italian Enemy. Death and Policy of ENI's President through Secret Papers), Milan, Leonardo Mondadori ISBN 978-88-355-0033-9
- 1991. (in Italian) Il dissesto programmato. Le partecipazioni statali nel sistema di consenso democristiano (The Planned Bankruptcy. The State Owned Industries in the Christian Democratic Consent System), Bari, Dedalo Libri ISBN 88-220-6115-2
- 1992. (in English and Danish) European and American Patterns in a Conflictive Development, Roskilde, RUC ISBN 87-7349-217-5
- 1992. (in Danish and English) Fjernt fra Maastricht. Far from Maastricht, Roskilde, RUC ISBN 9788773492185
- 1993. (in Italian) La morte necessaria di Enrico Mattei (The Necessary Death of Enrico Mattei), Viterbo, Millelire Stampa Alternativa ISBN 88-7226-141-4
- 1993. (in English) The Strategic Stakes in Mattei's Flight, in EIR, Vol. 20, No. 23, Washington, DC, June 11, 1993 ISSN 0273-6314
- 1995. (in Italian) De Gasperi e l'America (America and De Gasperi. Under an Uncontrolled and Full Domination), Palermo, Sellerio ISBN 88-389-1110-X
- 1995. (in Italian) Obiettivo Mattei. Petrolio, Stati Uniti e politica dell'Eni (Target Mattei. Oil, United States and ENI Policy), Roma, Gamberetti ISBN 88-7990-010-2
- 1996. (in English) Maastricht from Scandinavia, Roskilde, RUCI In: Festschrift 14 papers in honour of Bruno Amoroso's 60th birthday ISBN 9788773493618
- 1996. (in Italian) Alcide De Gasperi. L'Italia atlantica (Alcide De Gasperi: The Atlantic Italy), Rome, Manifestolibri ISBN 88-7285-102-5
- 1996. (in Italian) James Monroe. Il manifesto dell'imperialismo americano (James Monroe: The Manifesto of American Imperialism), Rome, Manifestolibri ISBN 88-7285-110-6
- 1997. (in Italian) John F. Kennedy. La nuova frontiera (John F. Kennedy: The New Frontier), Rome, Manifestolibri ISBN 88-7285-120-3
- 1998. The Mediterranean and the American Patronage
- 1999. (in Italian) Giallo Mattei. I discorsi del fondatore dell'Eni che sfidò gli United States, la NATO e le Sette Sorelle (Mattei's Thriller. The Speeches of the Founder of ENI Who Challenged the USA, NATO, and the Seven Sisters), Rome, Stampa Alternativa Nuovi Equilibri ISBN 88-7226-508-8
- 2000. (in Italian) Il truglio. Infami, delatori e pentiti nel Regno di Napoli (The Muddle. Infamous, Delator, and Repentant People in the Kingdom of Naples), Palermo, Sellerio ISBN 88-389-1623-3
- 2001. (in Italian) Enrico Mattei, Bologna, Il Mulino, 2001 ISBN 88-15-07913-0
- 2002. (in Italian) Il segno della DC. L’Italia dalla sconfitta al G7 (The DC Sign. Italy from Its Defeat to G-7), Bari, Dedalo Libri ISBN 88-220-6253-1
- 2002. (in Italian) Economia pubblica rimossa (The Public Economy Removed. The Italian State Participations from the Theory of Improper Burdens to the Privatization), in Studi in onore di Luca Buttaro, Milano, Giuffrè ISBN 88-14-10088-8
- 2003. (in English) The International Economy from a Political to an Authoritative Drive, in Globalisation and Welfare, Roskilde, Roskilde University Press ISBN 87-7867-272-4
- 2006. (in Italian) La Loggia della Philantropia (The Philantropia Lodge. A Danish Priest to Naples before the Revolution. With Masonic Papers and Other Documents), Palermo, Sellerio ISBN 88-389-2141-5
- 2006. (in Italian) Perché uccisero Enrico Mattei. Petrolio e guerra fredda nel primo grande delitto italiano (Why They Have Killed Enrico Mattei. Oil and Cold War in the First Great Italian Crime), Rome, L'Unità Libri
- 2009. (in Italian) L’inventore del trasformismo. Liborio Romano, strumento di Cavour per la conquista di Napoli (The Creator of Political Shifting. Liborio Romano, Cavour's Instrument for the Conquest of Naples), Soveria Mannelli, Rubbettino ISBN 978-88-498-2496-4
- 2010. (in Italian) Obama. Il peso delle promesse. Yes, we can't (Obama. Heavy Promises. Yes, We Can't), 1st and 2nd enlarged edition, Lamezia Terme, Settecolori ISBN 978-88-96986-00-4
- 2011. (in Italian) L'agente segreto di Cavour. Giuseppe Massari e il mistero del diario mutilato (Cavour's secret agent. Giuseppe Massari and the mystery of his mutilated diary), Bari, Palomar ISBN 978-88-7600-414-8
- 2013. (in Italian) Progetto di un impero. 1823. L'annuncio dell'egemonia americana infiamma la borsa (Project of an Empire. 1823. The Announcement of American Hegemony Inflames the Stock Exchange), Naples, La Città del Sole ISBN 978-88-8292-310-5
- 2015. (in Italian) La profezia di Sciascia. Una conversazione e quattro lettere, Milan, Archinto ISBN 978-88-7768-676-3
- 2016. (in Italian) Arrestate Garibaldi. L'ordine impossibile di Cavour, Rome, Salerno Editrice ISBN 978-88-6973-194-5
- 2017. (in Italian) La svolta occidentale. De Gasperi e il nuovo ruolo internazionale dell’Italia, Rome, Castelvecchi ISBN 978-88-6944-810-2
- 2022. (in Italian) Il realismo politico di De Gasperi. Fanfani invece vuole i missili americani, Rome, Bastogi ISBN 9-788855-011396
