= Catia Summaria =

Italian jurist

Promoter of Justice of the Court of Appeals of Vatican City
- Incumbent
- Assumed office 5 February 2021
- Appointed by: Pope Francis
- Preceded by: Raffaele Coppola

Catia Summaria (born 1947) is an Italian lawyer, jurist and magistrate, who is Promoter of Justice in the Court of Appeals of the Vatican City. She is the first woman to hold the position.

== Career ==
Summaria is a lawyer, jurist and magistrate. From 1980 to 1989 she was a judicial auditor; she was subsequently appointed to the District Prosecutor's Office of Rome as deputy. In 2000 she was appointed deputy prosecutor of the Public Prosecutor's Office at the Ordinary Court of Rome, a role she held until 2011. She then was appointed deputy prosecutor of Rome's Court of Appeal, holding the position until 2017. In 2015 she was a member of the commission that reviewed reform of the Italian judicial system.

On 5 February 2021 Summaria was appointed Promoter of Justice in the Vatican's Court of Appeals of the Vatican City. She is the first woman ever to hold the position. Her predecessor was Raffaele Coppola (it), who left the role in April 2019. Her appointment was described by Crux Now as Pope Francis' "ultimate sign of [his] seriousness about women's empowerment".

== Personal life ==
Born in 1947 in Bari, she is married with two daughters.
