= Bari =

City in Apulia, Italy

Bari Bare (Neapolitan)
- Comune
- Comune di Bari
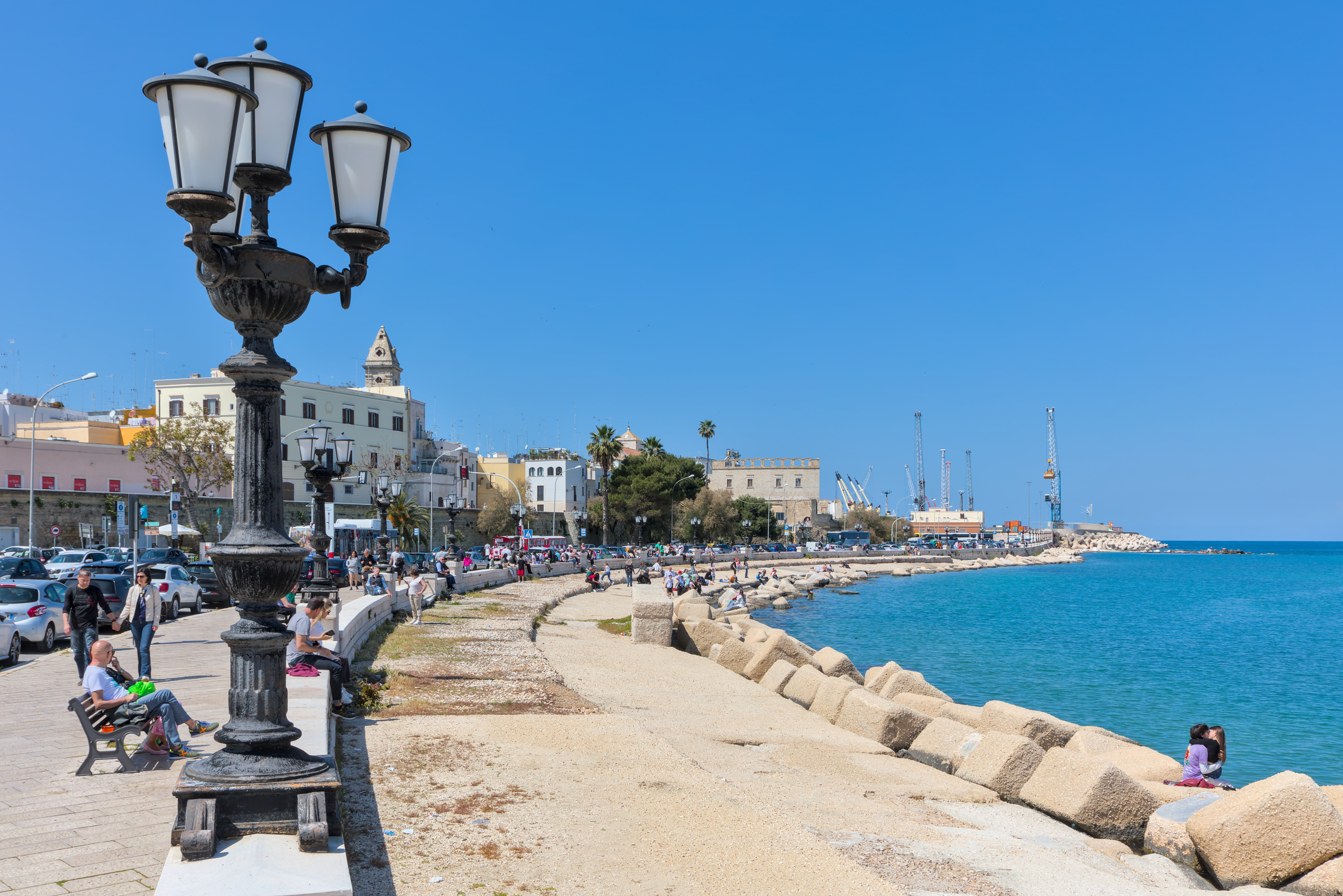
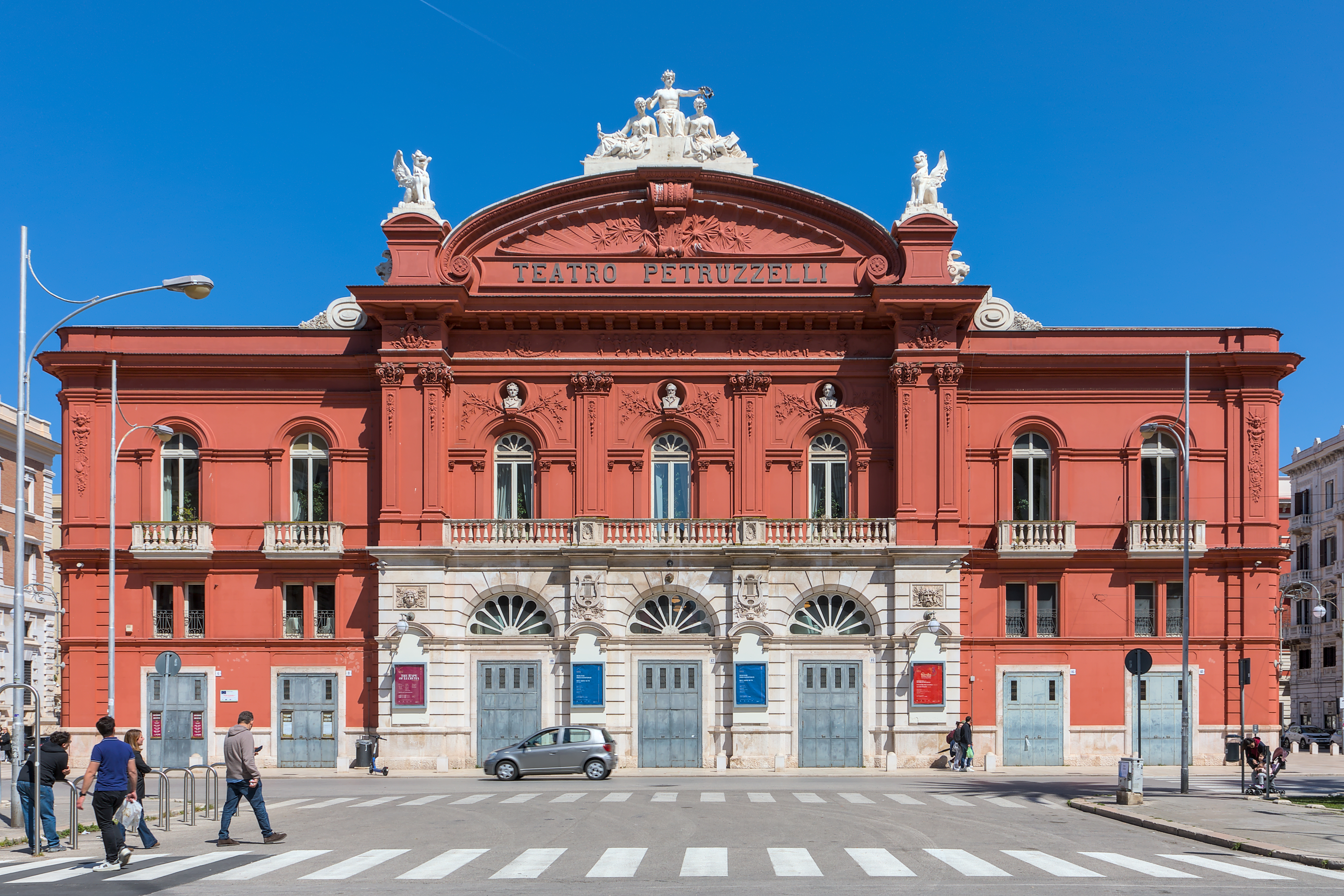
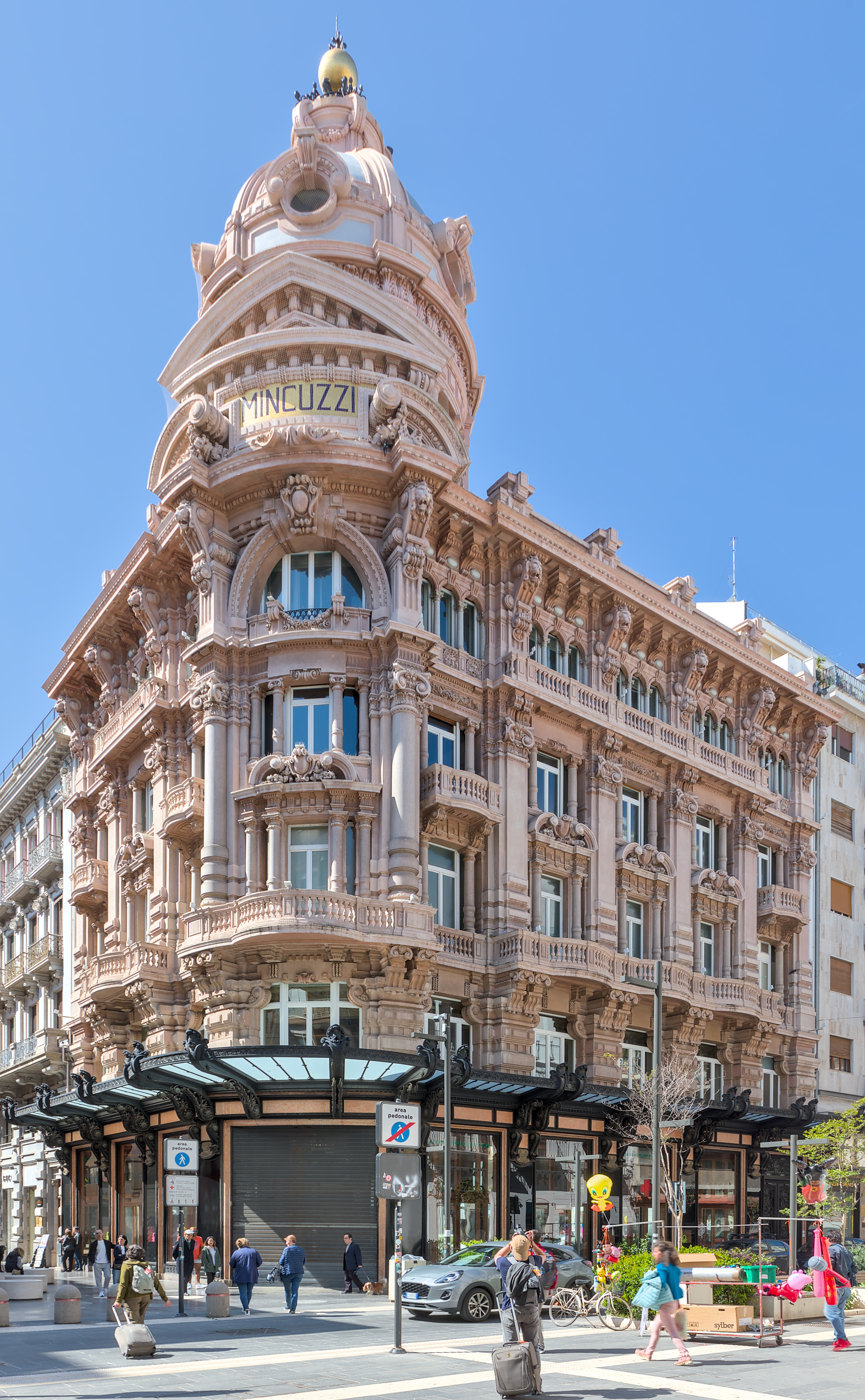
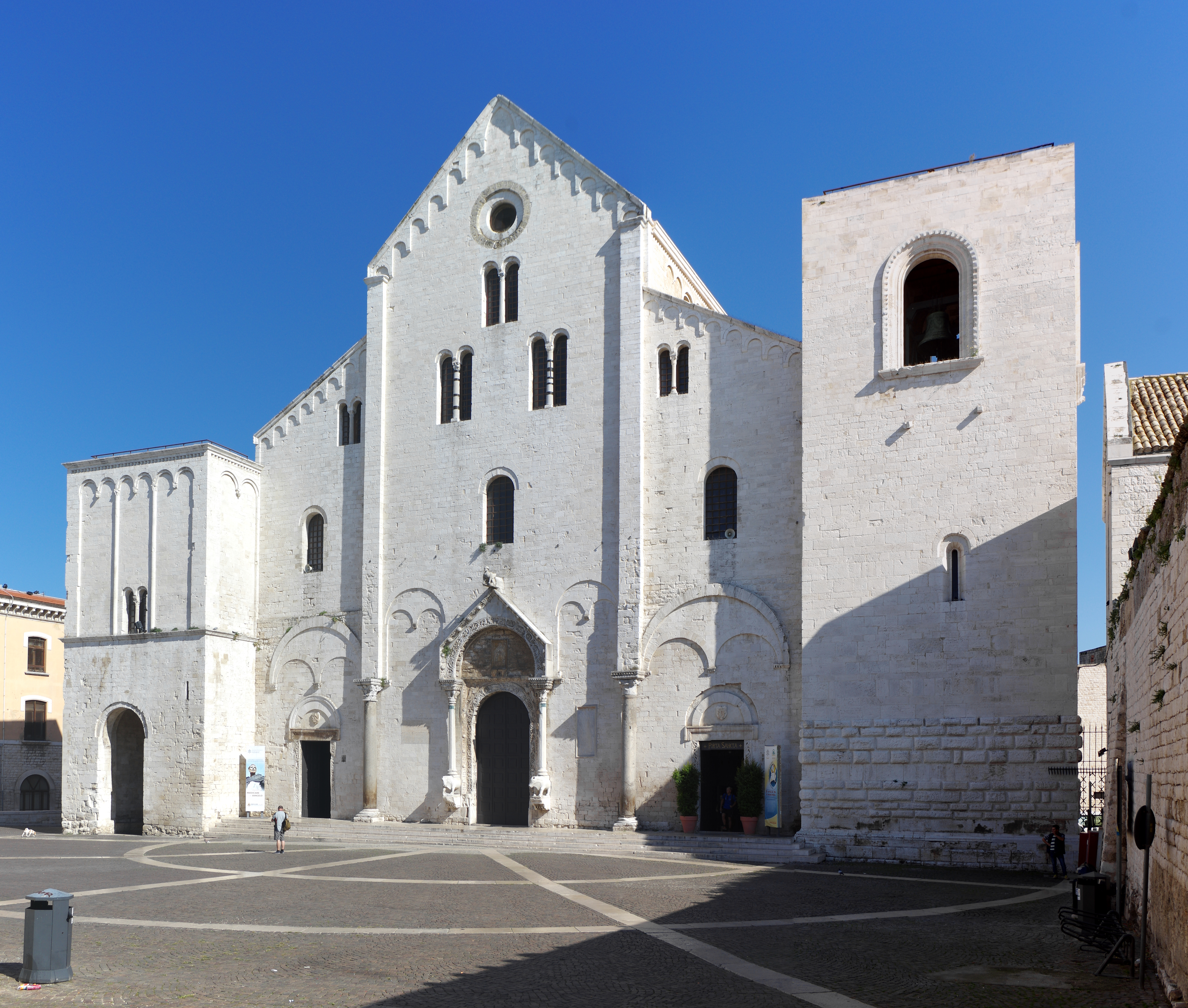
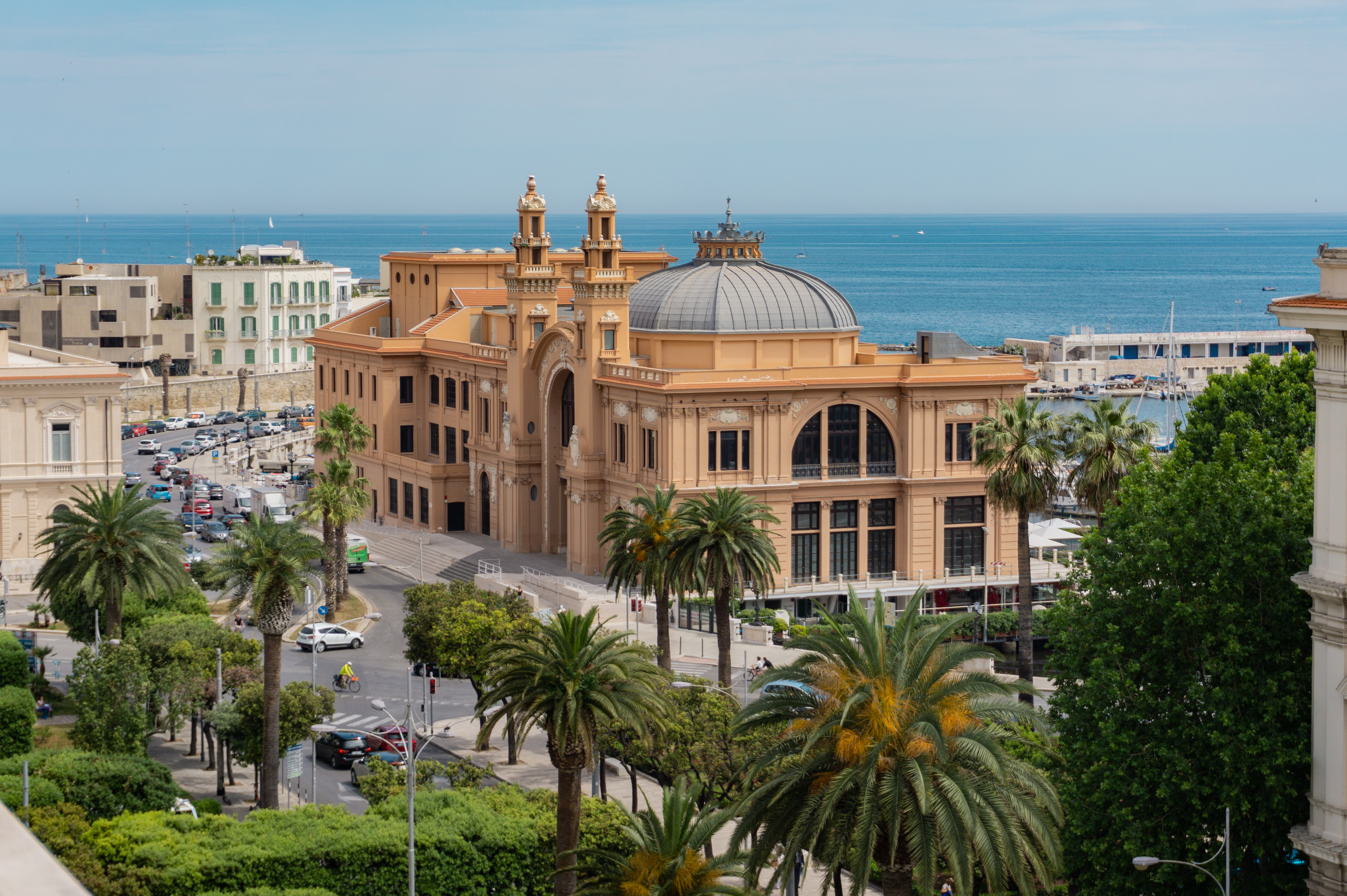
- Lungomare di Bari Teatro Petruzzelli Palazzo Mincuzzi Basilica di San Nicola Teatro Margherita

- Flag Coat of arms

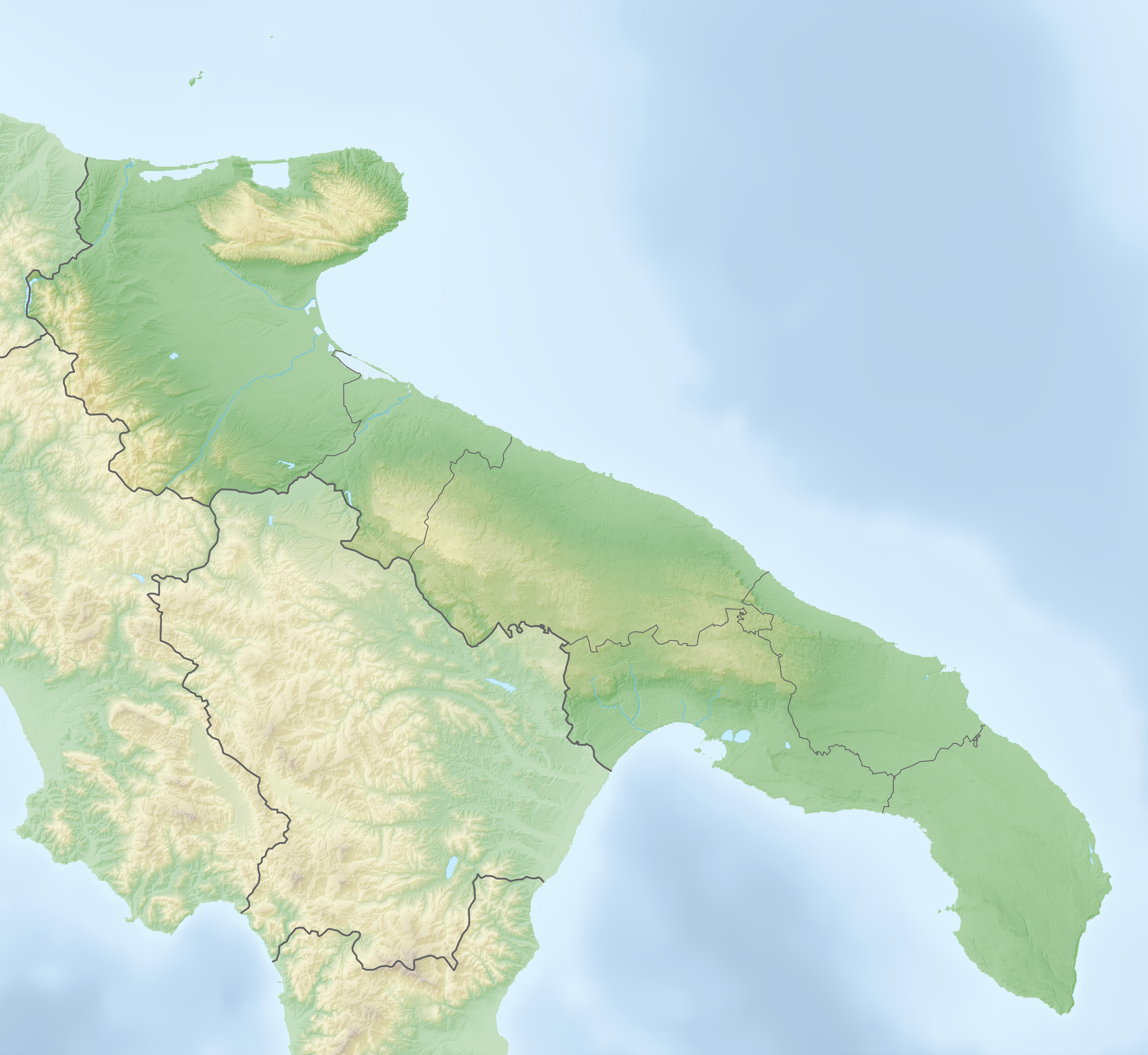
- Location within Italy Location within Apulia Location within Europe
- Coordinates: 41°07′31″N 16°52′0″E
- Country: Italy
- Region: Apulia
- Metropolitan city: Bari (BA)

Government
  - Mayor: Vito Leccese (PD)

Area
  - Total: 117.39 km^{2} (45.32 sq mi)
- Elevation: 5 m (16 ft)

Population (2026)
  - Total: 316,248
  - Density: 2,694.0/km^{2} (6,977.4/sq mi)
- Demonym: Barese
- Time zone: UTC+1 (CET)
  - Summer (DST): UTC+2 (CEST)
- Postal code: 70121-70132
- Dialing code: 080
- ISTAT code: 072006
- Patron saint: St. Nicholas
- Saint day: 8 May
- Website: www.comune.bari.it

Bari (/ˈbɑːri/ BAR-ee; Italian: [ˈbaːri]; Barese: Bare [ˈbæːrə]; Latin: Barium) is the capital city of the Metropolitan City of Bari and of the region of Apulia, on the Adriatic Sea in southern Italy. It is one of the most important economic centres of mainland southern Italy. It is a port and university city as well as the city of Saint Nicholas. The city itself is the 9th-largest city in Italy with a population of 316,248, while the urban area has approximately 750,000 inhabitants. Its metropolitan province is the 5th-largest metropolitan city in the country, with a population of 1,218,073.

Bari is made up of four different urban sections. To the north is the closely built old town on the peninsula between two modern harbours, with the Basilica of Saint Nicholas, the Cathedral of San Sabino (1035–1171) and the Norman-Swabian Castle, which is now also a major nightlife district. To the south is the Murat quarter (erected by Joachim Murat), the modern heart of the city, which is laid out on a rectangular grid-plan with a promenade on the sea and the major shopping district (the via Sparano and via Argiro).

Modern residential zones surrounding the centre of Bari were built during the 1960s and 1970s replacing the old suburbs that had developed along roads splaying outwards from gates in the city walls. In addition, the outer suburbs developed rapidly during the 1990s.

== History ==
=== Ancient ===
Bari itself known in antiquity as Barium, was a harbour of the Iapygian Peuceti. The authors of the Etymologicum Magnum have preserved an etymology by authors of antiquity about Barium, which they explain as the word "house" in Messapic. The city had strong Greek influences before the Roman era. In Ancient Greek, it was known as Βάριον. In the 3rd century BC, it became part of the Roman Republic and was subsequently Romanized. The city developed strategic significance as the point of junction between the coast road and the Via Traiana and as a port for eastward trade; a branch road to Tarentum led from Barium. Its harbour, mentioned as early as 181 BC, was probably the principal one of the districts in ancient times, as it is at present, and was the centre of a fishery. The first historical bishop of Bari was Gervasius who was noted at the Council of Sardica in 347.

=== Middle Ages ===
With the fall of the Western Roman Empire in 476, Bari was invaded by Barbarians and occupied by the Ostrogoths. It was taken from them by the Byzantine Empire during the Gothic wars and disputed for the following two centuries with the Lombards of the Duchy of Benevento, who made it a steward.

Throughout this period, and indeed throughout the Middle Ages, Bari served as one of the major slave depots of the Mediterranean, providing a central location for the trade in Slavic slaves. The slaves were mostly captured by Venice from Dalmatia, by the Holy Roman Empire from what is now Eastern Germany and Poland, and by the Byzantines from elsewhere in the Balkans, and were generally destined for other parts of the Byzantine Empire and (most frequently) the Muslim states surrounding the Mediterranean: the Abbasid Caliphate, the Umayyad Caliphate of Córdoba, the Emirate of Sicily, and the Fatimid Caliphate (which relied on Slavs purchased at the Bari market for its legions of Sakalaba Mamluks).

For 20 years, Bari was the centre of the Emirate of Bari; the city was captured by its first emirs Kalfun in 847, who had been part of the mercenary garrison installed there by Radelchis I of Benevento. The city was conquered and the emirate extinguished in 871 following five-year campaign by Frankish Emperor Louis II, assisted by a Byzantine fleet. Chris Wickham states Louis spent five years campaigning to reduce then occupy Bari, "and then only to a Byzantine/Slav naval blockade"; "Louis took the credit" for the success, adding "at least in Frankish eyes", then concludes by noting that by remaining in southern Italy long after this success, he "achieved the near-impossible: an alliance against him of the Beneventans, Salernitans, Neapolitans and Spoletans; later sources include Sawadān as well." In 885, Bari became the residence of the local Byzantine catapan, or governor. The failed revolt (1009–1011) of the Lombard nobles Melus of Bari and his brother-in-law Dattus, against the Byzantine governorate, though it was firmly repressed at the Battle of Cannae (1018), offered their Norman adventurer allies a first foothold in the region. In 1025, under the Archbishop Byzantius, Bari became attached to the see of Rome and was granted "provincial" status.

In 1071, Bari was captured by Robert Guiscard, following a three-year siege, ending what remained of the Byzantine power in the region. Following this, Bari's physical and political landscapes were changed: the praetorium which had functioned as a political centre was converted into the Basilica of Saint Nicholas. Relics of Saint Nicholas were brought to Bari in 1087 and installed in the basilica.

In 1095, Peter the Hermit preached the First Crusade there. In October 1098, Urban II, who had consecrated the Basilica in 1089, convened the Council of Bari, one of a series of synods convoked with the intention of reconciling the Eastern and Western Church on the question of the filioque clause in the Creed, which Anselm ably defended, seated at the pope's side.

In 1136 the Holy Roman Emperor, Lothair, captured Bari. A Byzantine army took control of Bari from William I of Sicily in 1155. William recaptured the city the following year, and on finding that his house had been destroyed began a campaign of reprisals causing widespread destruction across the city. The city walls were destroyed, an act which archaeologist Giulia Bellato suggests was a symbolic downgrading of Bari's status and that of its inhabitants. The events are chronicled by Hugo Falcandus.

During Joanna I of Naples' conflict with Hungary, Bari was besieged in 1349 and captured by a combined Germany and Hungarian army.

=== Early modern period ===
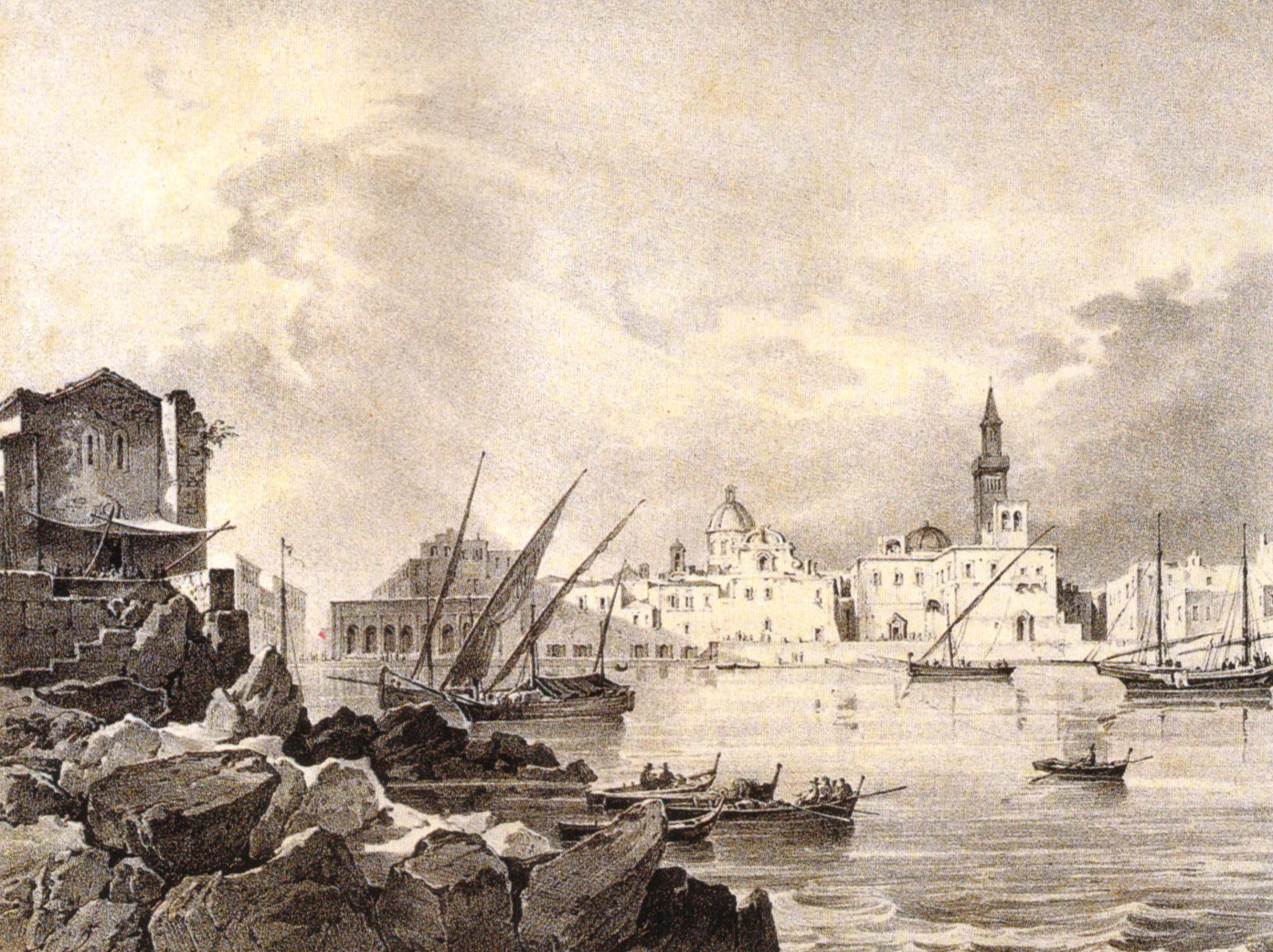
19th-century image of the port of Bari

A long period of decline characterized the city under the dominations of Aldoino Filangieri di Candida, and those of the Kings of Naples, which held the control of the entire mainland southern Italy from 1282 to 1806. This decline was interrupted, however, by the splendor under the Sforzas, who ruled the city as Dukes of Bari, a title given by the Neapolitan crown, in particular under the rule of the dukes Ludovico and Beatrice d'Este, then of the duchesses Isabella of Aragon and Bona Sforza. Bari also underwent Venetian domination, which led to the expansion of the port and a very prosperous period, also favored by the trade of inland products, which were in great demand on foreign markets.

In 1556, Princess Bona Sforza of Aragon, second wife of the King of Poland Sigismund I, left Poland and settled in Bari, whose principality she had inherited from her parents. During her reign, she fortified the city's castle, as evidenced by an inscription in bronze letters on the cornice around the courtyard, as well as building several churches, a monastery, two water cisterns and made many donations to the monks of the Basilica of San Nicola. Bona Sforza died in the city in 1557. Following her death, the city of Bari came under the direct rule of the kings of Naples.

In 1813, Joachim Murat, King of Naples in the Napoleonic era, began a new urbanization, changing the face of the city and setting a new "chessboard" growth model, which continued for many years to come. The village built at the time on the outskirts of the old city still retains its name.

Modern plumbing arrived in the city of Bari on 24 April 1915: it was the first completed leg of the nascent Apulian Aqueduct. During the 1930s, Araldo di Crollalanza, the mayor and minister of Bari, oversaw the development of its modern waterfront.

=== World War II ===
On 11 September 1943, in connection with the Armistice of Cassibile, Bari was taken without resistance by the British 1st Airborne Division. During October and November 1943, New Zealand troops from the 2nd New Zealand Division assembled in Bari.

==== The 1943 chemical warfare disaster ====
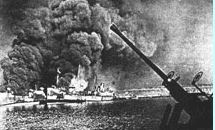
The SS John Harvey on fire on 2 December 1943, at Bari

A fleet of German Luftwaffe bombers attacked Allied forces and shipping in Bari on 2 December 1943. An American ship, the SS John Harvey, carrying a secret cargo of 2,000 mustard gas bombs, was destroyed causing release of the gas into the air and sea, resulting in death, chemical burns, and blindness among sailors and the civilian population of the city.

A member of U.S. General Dwight D. Eisenhower's medical staff, Stewart F. Alexander, was dispatched to Bari following the raid. Alexander had trained at the Army's Edgewood Arsenal in Maryland, and was familiar with some of the effects of mustard gas. Although he was not informed of the cargo carried by the John Harvey, and most victims suffered atypical symptoms caused by exposure to mustard gas diluted in water and oil (as opposed to airborne), Alexander rapidly concluded that mustard gas was present. Although he could not get any acknowledgement of this from the chain of command, Alexander convinced medical staff to treat patients for mustard gas exposure and saved many lives as a result. He also preserved many tissue samples from autopsied victims at Bari. After World War II, these samples would result in the development of an early form of chemotherapy based on mustard gas, Mustine.

On the orders of Allied leaders Franklin D. Roosevelt, Winston Churchill, and Eisenhower, records were destroyed and the whole affair was kept secret for many years after the war. The U.S. records of the attack were declassified in 1959, but the episode remained obscure until 1967, when writer Glenn B. Infield exposed the story in his book Disaster at Bari. Additionally, there is considerable dispute as to the exact number of fatalities. In one account: "[S]ixty-nine deaths were attributed in whole or in part to the mustard gas, most of them American merchant seamen." Others put the count as high as "more than one thousand Allied servicemen and more than one thousand Italian civilians".

The affair is the subject of two books: the aforementioned Disaster at Bari, by Glenn B. Infield, and Nightmare in Bari: The World War II Liberty Ship Poison Gas Disaster and Coverup, by Gerald Reminick.

In 1988, through the efforts of Nick T. Spark, U.S. Senators Dennis DeConcini and Bill Bradley, Stewart Alexander received recognition from the Surgeon General of the United States Army for his actions during the Bari disaster.

==== Charles Henderson explosion ====
The port of Bari was again struck by disaster on 9 April 1945 when the Liberty ship Charles Henderson exploded in the harbour while offloading 2,000 tons of aerial bombs (half of that amount had been offloaded when the explosion occurred). Three hundred and sixty people were killed and 1,730 were wounded. The harbour was again rendered non-operational, this time for a month.

9 April 1945 – view from the barracks. Photo by WOJG Hubert Platt Henderson who was stationed at Bari as the Director of the 773rd Band.

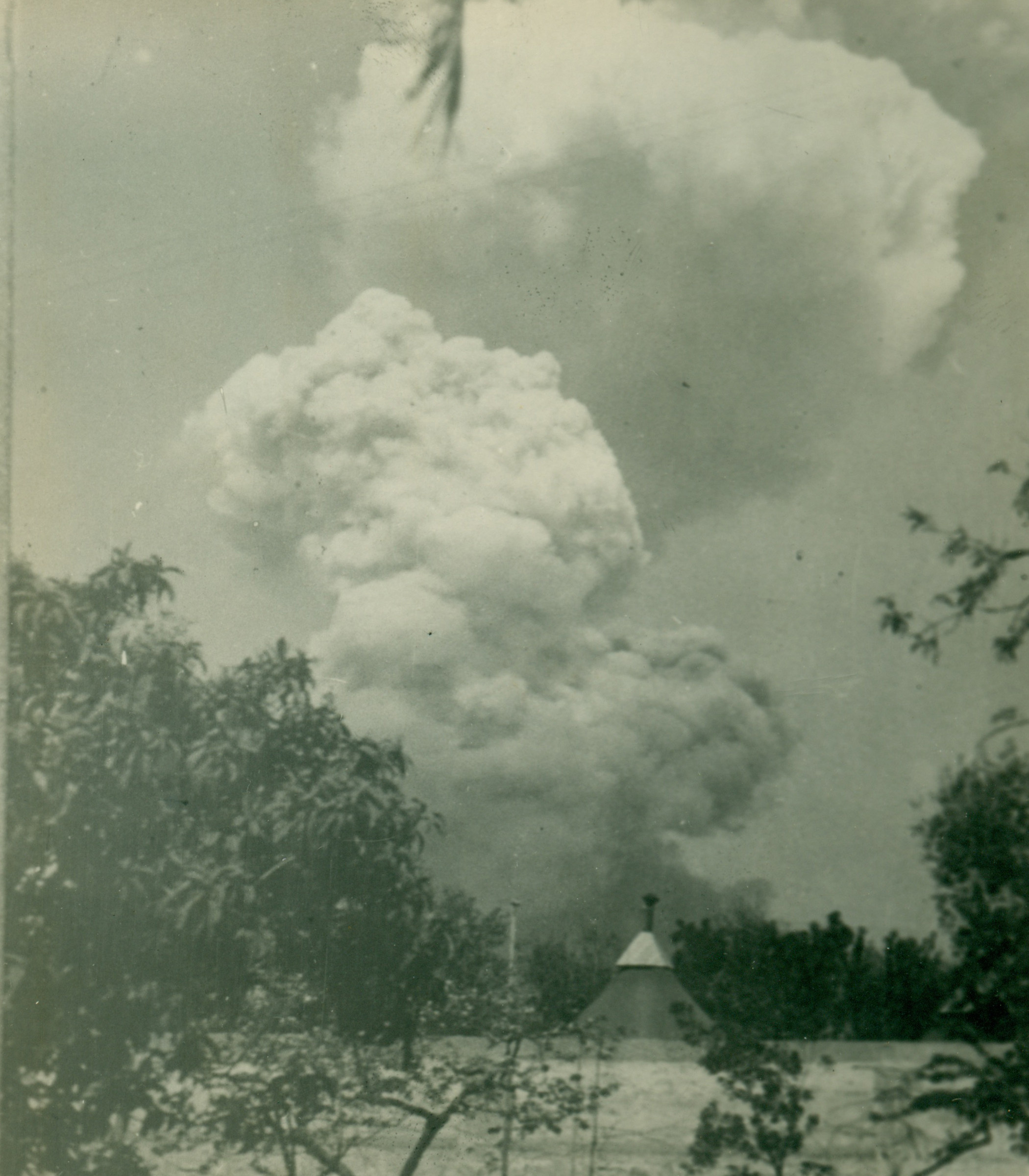
9 April 1945 – photo by WOJG Hubert Platt Henderson who was stationed at Bari as the Director of the 773rd Band

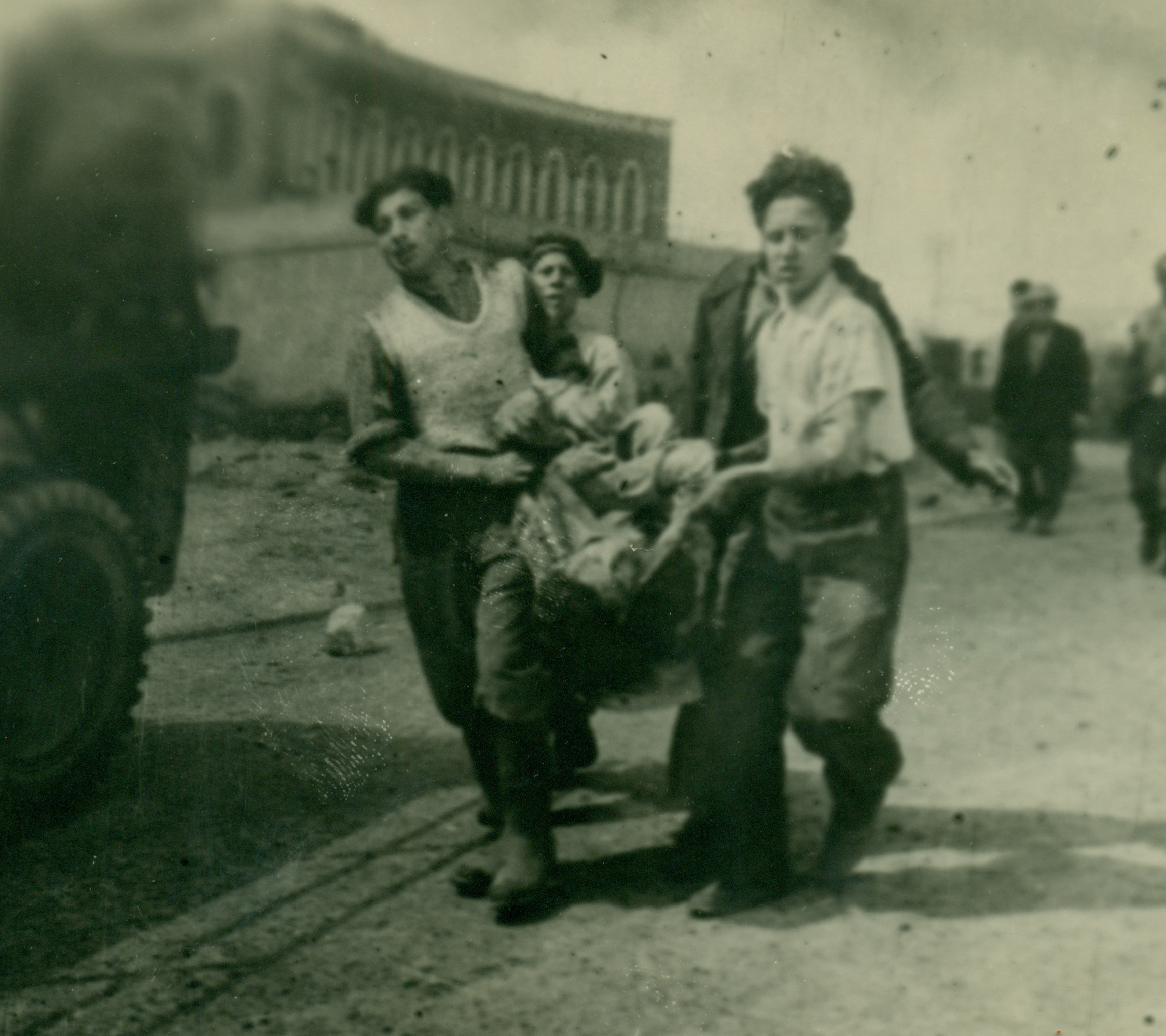
9 April 1945 – photo by WOJG Hubert Platt Henderson who was stationed at Bari as the Director of the 773rd Band

== Geography ==
Bari is the largest urban and metro area on the Adriatic. It is located in southern Italy, at a more northerly latitude than Naples, further south than Rome.

=== Climate ===
Bari has a hot-summer Mediterranean climate (Köppen: Csa) bordering on a cold semi-arid climate (Köppen: BSk) due to high evapotranspiration, with mild winters and hot, dry summers.

Climate data for Bari Karol Wojtyła Airport (1991–2020 normals, extremes 1932–present)
| Month | Jan | Feb | Mar | Apr | May | Jun | Jul | Aug | Sep | Oct | Nov | Dec | Year |
|---|---|---|---|---|---|---|---|---|---|---|---|---|---|
| Record high °C (°F) | 24.0 (75.2) | 25.1 (77.2) | 31.6 (88.9) | 32.6 (90.7) | 39.1 (102.4) | 45.5 (113.9) | 45.6 (114.1) | 44.8 (112.6) | 39.1 (102.4) | 35.2 (95.4) | 28.7 (83.7) | 24.0 (75.2) | 45.6 (114.1) |
| Mean maximum °C (°F) | 17.5 (63.5) | 18.2 (64.8) | 22.4 (72.3) | 26.1 (79.0) | 30.5 (86.9) | 35.2 (95.4) | 37.4 (99.3) | 37.1 (98.8) | 32.5 (90.5) | 27.6 (81.7) | 22.3 (72.1) | 18.4 (65.1) | 38.6 (101.5) |
| Mean daily maximum °C (°F) | 12.6 (54.7) | 13.2 (55.8) | 15.7 (60.3) | 19.0 (66.2) | 23.6 (74.5) | 28.2 (82.8) | 30.6 (87.1) | 30.5 (86.9) | 26.2 (79.2) | 21.9 (71.4) | 17.6 (63.7) | 13.9 (57.0) | 21.1 (70.0) |
| Daily mean °C (°F) | 8.3 (46.9) | 8.7 (47.7) | 10.9 (51.6) | 13.9 (57.0) | 18.5 (65.3) | 23.0 (73.4) | 25.4 (77.7) | 25.4 (77.7) | 21.2 (70.2) | 17.2 (63.0) | 13.2 (55.8) | 9.6 (49.3) | 16.3 (61.3) |
| Mean daily minimum °C (°F) | 4.1 (39.4) | 4.2 (39.6) | 6.0 (42.8) | 8.9 (48.0) | 13.0 (55.4) | 17.3 (63.1) | 20.0 (68.0) | 20.1 (68.2) | 16.5 (61.7) | 12.6 (54.7) | 9.0 (48.2) | 5.8 (42.4) | 11.5 (52.7) |
| Mean minimum °C (°F) | 2.1 (35.8) | 2.4 (36.3) | 4.2 (39.6) | 7.1 (44.8) | 11.3 (52.3) | 15.4 (59.7) | 18.2 (64.8) | 18.5 (65.3) | 14.8 (58.6) | 11.2 (52.2) | 6.6 (43.9) | 3.3 (37.9) | 1.0 (33.8) |
| Record low °C (°F) | −7.6 (18.3) | −3.0 (26.6) | −5.4 (22.3) | −0.9 (30.4) | 3.6 (38.5) | 7.8 (46.0) | 11.8 (53.2) | 12.4 (54.3) | 8.4 (47.1) | 4.0 (39.2) | −1.0 (30.2) | −3.6 (25.5) | −7.6 (18.3) |
| Average precipitation mm (inches) | 50.8 (2.00) | 37.0 (1.46) | 41.0 (1.61) | 42.0 (1.65) | 30.4 (1.20) | 29.4 (1.16) | 17.8 (0.70) | 13.3 (0.52) | 41.7 (1.64) | 53.9 (2.12) | 62.0 (2.44) | 47.4 (1.87) | 466.6 (18.37) |
| Average precipitation days (≥ 1.0 mm) | 7.4 | 5.6 | 6.5 | 6.0 | 4.5 | 3.0 | 1.9 | 2.3 | 4.8 | 5.5 | 7.0 | 7.0 | 61.4 |
| Average relative humidity (%) | 71.8 | 69.7 | 69.1 | 67.8 | 66.3 | 64.2 | 60.4 | 63.3 | 68.3 | 73.2 | 74.9 | 73.1 | 68.5 |
| Mean monthly sunshine hours | 132.9 | 163.9 | 230.8 | 265.5 | 312.9 | 336.4 | 355.6 | 318.5 | 252.8 | 202.8 | 137.0 | 120.4 | 2,829.5 |
| Percentage possible sunshine | 44.6 | 55.1 | 62.5 | 66.6 | 69.7 | 74.3 | 77.7 | 75.1 | 68.3 | 59.6 | 46.5 | 41.9 | 63.7 |
Source 1: NOAA
Source 2: Servizio Meteorologico (extremes), Weather.Directory

=== Administrative divisions ===
Municipi of Bari

Bari is divided into five municipalities (Municipi), constituted in 2014. The municipality is also divided into 17 official neighbourhoods (quartieri).

| Municipio | Population (2021) | Area (km²) | Density |
|---|---|---|---|
| Municipio 1 | 113,071 | 24.07 km^{2} | 4,697.6 |
| Municipio 2 | 91,797 | 15.44 km^{2} | 5,945.4 |
| Municipio 3 | 49,452 | 22.51 km^{2} | 2,196.9 |
| Municipio 4 | 35,425 | 33.16 km^{2} | 1,068.3 |
| Municipio 5 | 26,203 | 21.56 km^{2} | 1,215.4 |

== Demographics ==
Historical population
| Year | Pop. | ±% |
|---|---|---|
| 1861 | 44,572 | — |
| 1871 | 61,541 | +38.1% |
| 1881 | 72,624 | +18.0% |
| 1901 | 94,236 | +29.8% |
| 1911 | 121,633 | +29.1% |
| 1921 | 136,247 | +12.0% |
| 1931 | 172,600 | +26.7% |
| 1936 | 197,918 | +14.7% |
| 1951 | 268,183 | +35.5% |
| 1961 | 312,023 | +16.3% |
| 1971 | 357,274 | +14.5% |
| 1981 | 371,022 | +3.8% |
| 1991 | 342,309 | −7.7% |
| 2001 | 316,532 | −7.5% |
| 2011 | 315,933 | −0.2% |
| 2021 | 315,948 | +0.0% |
Source: ISTAT

As of 2026, the population is 316,248, of which 48.3% are male, and 51.7% are female. Minors make up 13.5% of the population, and seniors make up 26.6%.

=== Immigration ===
As of 2025, immigrants make up 6.0% of the total population. The 5 largest foreign countries of birth are Georgia, Bangladesh, Albania, Romania, and Pakistan.

=== Urban and economic migration ===
According to an urban migration study in Bari, return migration gain to urban areas is higher than migration loss from urban areas. People migrating from urban destinations tend to migrate to different places in comparison to people migrating from rural areas. These findings are based on the background and behavior of a sample of 211 return migrants to Bari, Italy. Bari is a port city, making it historically important because of its strong trade links with Greece, North Africa, and the eastern Mediterranean. Bari's economic structure is based on industry, commerce, services, and administration. Around two-thirds of the city's employment is in the tertiary sector with its port, commerce, and administrative functions. The highest percentage of Bari's working population is employed in services, with 45.6%. From 1958 to 1982, around 20% of migrants left Bari for other Italian communes, while around 17% or migrants came to Bari from other Italian communes. Under 2% of migrants left Bari to go abroad and came to the city from abroad.

== Culture ==
=== Cuisine and gastronomy ===
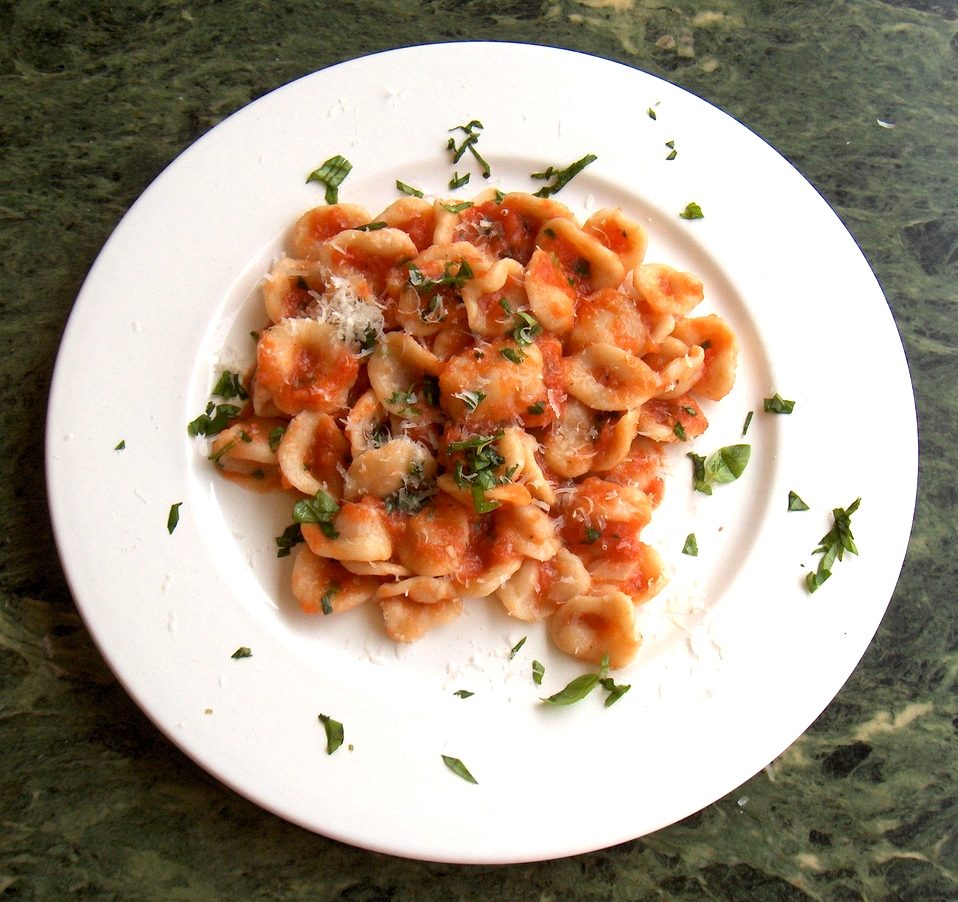
A dish of orecchiette

Bari's cuisine is based on three typical agricultural products found within the surrounding region of Apulia, namely wheat, olive oil, and wine.

Bari is also known for being the origin of Spaghetti all'assassina.

== Sport ==
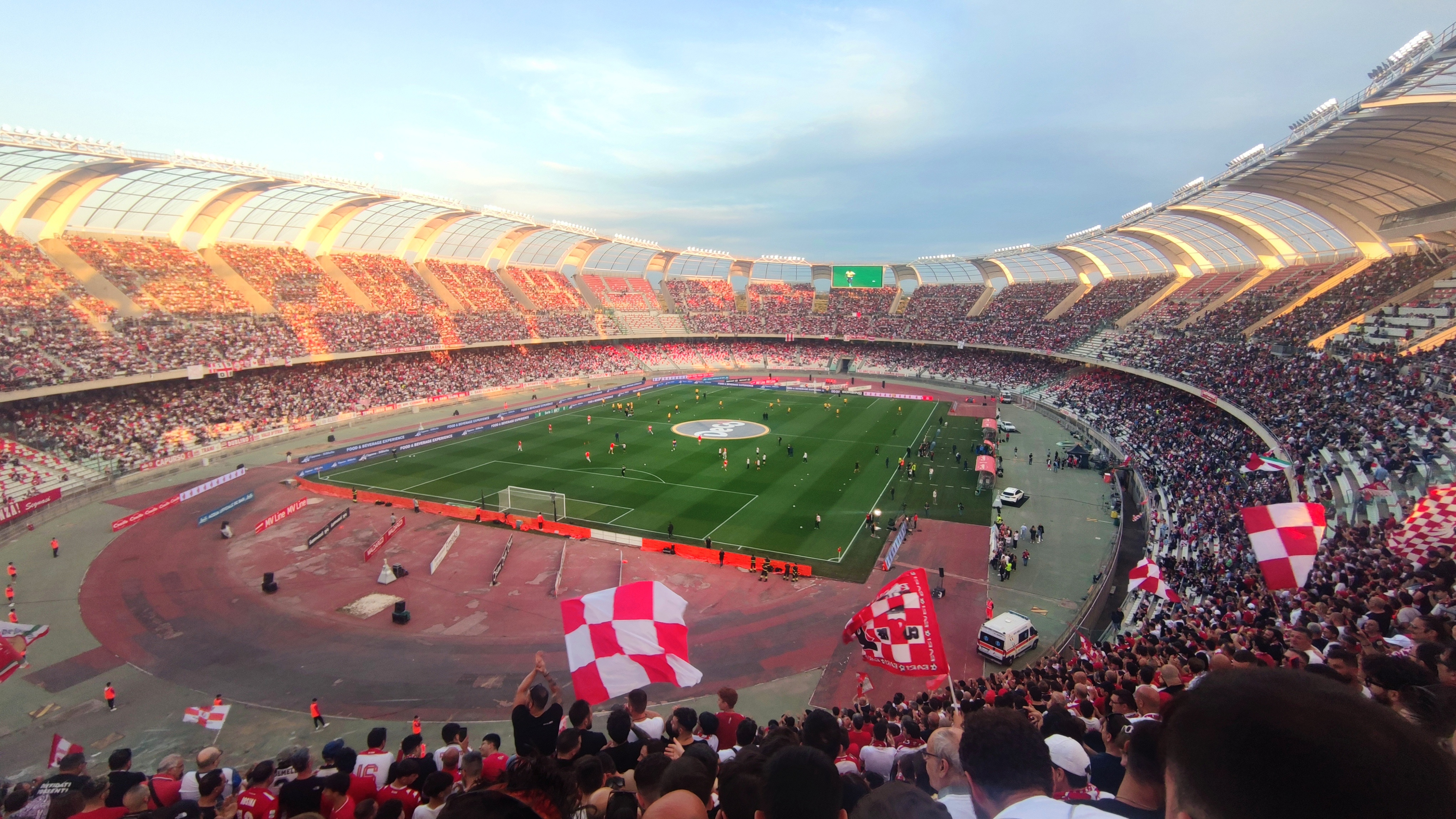
Stadio San Nicola

Local football club S.S.C. Bari, currently competing in Serie B (as of the 2024–2025 season), plays in the Stadio San Nicola, an architecturally innovative 58,000-seater stadium purpose-built for the 1990 FIFA World Cup. The stadium also hosted the 1991 European Cup final.

In 2007, Bari hosted the first and only world games for underwater sports.

== Education ==
- Academy of Fine Arts of Bari
- Conservatory of Bari
- Polytechnic University of Bari
- University of Bari

== Transport ==
=== Air ===
Bari has its own airport, Bari Karol Wojtyła Airport, which is located 8 km (5.0 mi) northwest of the centre of Bari. It is connected to the centre by train services from Bari Aeroporto railway station.

=== Rail ===
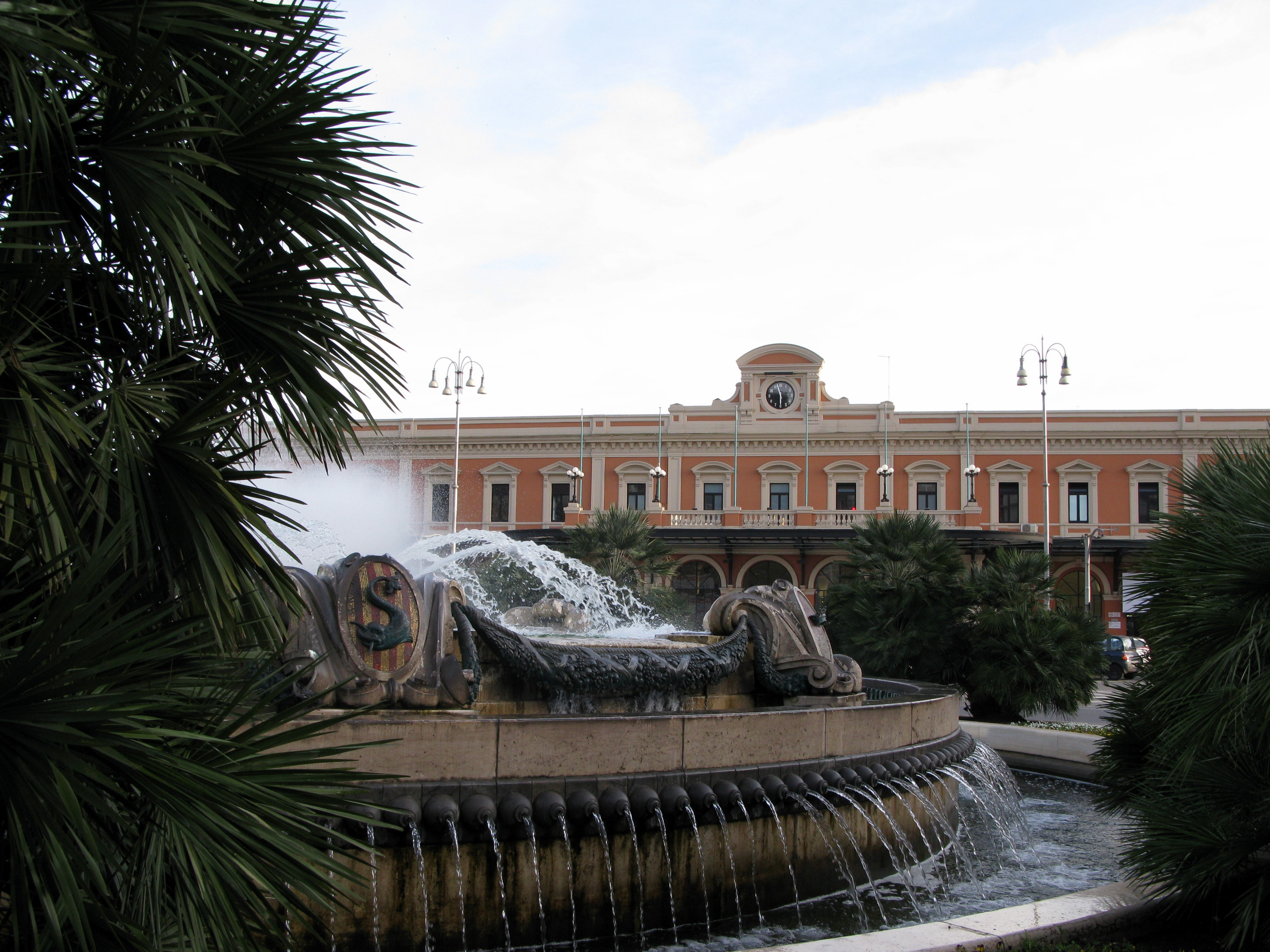
Bari Central Station

Bari Central Station lies on the Adriatic railway and has connections to cities such as Rome, Milan, Bologna, Turin and Venice. Another mainline is connected southwards by the Bari–Taranto railway. The Bari metropolitan railway service operates local commuter services, while regional services also operate to Foggia, Barletta, Brindisi, Lecce, Taranto and other towns and villages in the Apulia region.

=== Port ===
Bari has an old fishery port (Porto Vecchio) and a so-called new port in the north, as well as some marinas. The Port of Bari is an important cargo transport hub to Southeast Europe. Various passenger transport lines include some seasonal ferry lines to Albania, Montenegro or Dubrovnik. Bari–Igoumenitsa is a popular ferry route to Greece. Some cruise ships call at Bari.

== In popular culture ==
The Guido Guerrieri novels by Gianrico Carofiglio are set in Bari, where Guerrieri is a criminal lawyer, and include many descriptions of the town.

Bari is one of the primary settings of the 1954 detective novel The Black Mountain by Rex Stout. It is the characters' point of embarkation to Communist Yugoslavia.

In the 1995 film The Bridges of Madison County, Italian housewife Francesca Johnson (Meryl Streep), is mentioned as being from Bari and growing up in Naples.

The 2020 Edoardo Ponti film La vita davanti a sé, starring Sophia Loren, is set in Bari.

Two Italian TV series -- Lolita Lobosco and Cold Summer -- are set in Bari.

== Notable people from Bari and Apulia ==
- Samuel ben Natronai
- Dino Abbrescia
- Licia Albanese
- Giovanni Alemanno
- Renzo Arbore
- Emanuele Arciuli
- Argiro
- Argyrus (catepan of Italy)
- Francesco Attolico
- Lino Banfi
- Alessio Bax
- Antonio Beatillo
- Antonio Bello
- Pope Benedict XIII
- Nicola Bellomo
- Francesco Boccia
- Giovanni Bovio
- Serena Brancale
- Gioia Bruno
- Luciano Canfora
- Ricciotto Canudo
- Gianrico Carofiglio
- Albano Carrisi
- Antonio Cassano
- Franco Cassano
- Gianni Ciardo
- Antonio Conte
- Giuseppe Conte
- Nicola Conte
- Peppino Cotturri
- Riccardo Cucciolla
- Enrico Dalfino
- Antonio De Caro
- Niccolò dell'Arca
- Fabio Delvino
- Giuseppe Denittis
- Nicola Di Bari
- Simeone Di Cagno Abbrescia
- Giuseppe Di Vittorio
- Giuseppe Di Vagno
- Michele Emiliano
- Agostino Ferrente
- Rino Formica
- Tommaso Fiore
- Chiara Fumai
- Giovanni Pietro Gallo
- Elena Gentile
- Franco Giordano
- Alfredo Giovine
- Giuseppe Gramegna
- Bianca Guaccero
- Ivan Iusco
- Pietro Laforgia
- Gaetano Latilla
- Vito Lattanzio
- Vito Leccese
- Claudio Lenoci
- Vito Vittorio Lenoci (Titino)
- Leonardo Leo
- Dulcita Lieggi
- Paolo Longo
- Guido Marzulli
- Gianvito Mastroleo
- Cecilia Mangini
- Antonio Custode Masciale
- Antonio Matarrese
- Daniela Mazzucca
- Melo Da Bari
- Ermal Meta
- Michele Mirabella
- Marco Misciagna
- Domenico Modugno
- Aldo Moro
- Pomponio Nenna
- Giovanni Cesare Netti
- Mario Nuzzolese
- Joe Orlando
- Anna Oxa
- Antonio Misceo
- Giuseppe Papalia
- Pietro Papagallo
- Giovanni Papapietro
- Adriano Pappalardo
- Pino Pascali
- Giovanni Pellegrino
- Armando Perotti
- Nico Perrone
- Benedetto Petrone (Benny)
- Vittorio Pesce Delfino
- Niccolò Piccinni
- Michele Placido
- Victor Posa
- Ada Princigalli
- Anna Maria Princigalli
- Giacomo Princigalli
- Lazarus Racanelli
- Francesco Racanelli
- Alfredo Reichlin
- Francesco Riefolo
- Rocco Rodio
- Sergio Rubini
- Nabil Salameh
- Gaetano Salvemini
- Domenico Sarro
- Lunetta Savino
- Alba Sasso
- Gaetano Scamarcio
- Riccardo Scamarcio
- Bona Sforza
- Claudio Signorile
- Cesare Stea
- Catia Summaria
- Gemma Taccogna
- Luisa Torsi
- Tommaso Traetta
- Domenico Triggiani
- Pope Urban VI
- Giuseppe Vacca
- Rodolfo Valentino
- Nichi Vendola
- Nicola Ventola
- Nicola Verlona
- Checco Zalone
- Edoardo Winspeare

== International relations ==
=== Twin towns – sister cities ===
Bari is twinned with:

- Banja Luka, Bosnia and Herzegovina
- Batumi, (Georgia (country)) Georgia
- Corfu, Greece
- Durrës, Albania
- Guangzhou, China
- Kostroma, Russia
- Mar del Plata, Argentina
- Monte Sant'Angelo, Italy
- Palma de Mallorca, Spain
- Patras, Greece
- San Giovanni Rotondo, Italy
- Słupsk, Poland
- Szczecin, Poland
- Sumgait, Azerbaijan

== See also ==
- Accademia Apulia
- Antivari (means 'opposite Bari')
- Bari Light – the Punta San Cataldo di Bari Lighthouse
- Durrës
- Province of Bari
