= Fabio Delvino =

Italian footballer (born 1998)

Personal information
- Date of birth: 1 March 1998 (age 28)
- Place of birth: Bari, Italy
- Height: 1.87 m (6 ft 2 in)
- Position: Defender

Team information
- Current team: Matera
- Number: 98

Youth career
- Bari
- 2012–2013: Fidelis Andria
- 2013–2014: Bisceglie
- 2014–2015: Barletta

Senior career*
Years	Team	Apps	(Gls)
2013–2014	Bisceglie	1	(0)
2015–2017	Matera	0	(0)
2016–2017	→ Bisceglie (loan)	25	(0)
2017–2018	Bisceglie	28	(2)
2018–2019	Alessandria	20	(0)
2019–2022	Virtus Francavilla	71	(0)
2022–2023	Fidelis Andria	22	(0)
2023–	Matera	15	(1)
- * Club domestic league appearances and goals as of 20 December 2023

Fabio Delvino (born 1 March 1998) is an Italian footballer who plays as a defender for Serie D club Matera.

== Club career ==
Delvino was born in Bari. He played football for various youth teams, playing 26 fourth-tier matches. He made his professional debut, in the Bisceglie, in the 2017–18 season of Serie C, on 16 September 2017 against Catanzaro, coming on as a substitute for Andrea Petta in the 31st minute. He signed to Alessandria on 13 September 2018.

On 24 June 2019, he signed a 2-year contract with Virtus Francavilla.

On 25 August 2022, Delvino returned to his youth club Fidelis Andria.

== Sources ==
- Fabio Delvino at TuttoCalciatori.net (in Italian)
