= Giovanni Cesare Netti =

Italian composer

Giovanni Cesare Netti (4 September 1649, in Putignano – Naples, before 31 July 1686) was an Italian composer and maestro di cappella.

== Works ==
They have been cataloged by Giovanni Tribuzio (siglum TN):

=== Cantatas ===
- TN I.1a: Addio cara libertà
- TN I.1b: Addio cara libertà
- TN I.2: L'innamorato Aminta
- TN I.3: Nel bel regno d'amore
- TN I.4: Nella stagione appunto
- TN I.5a: Occhi belli, s'io v'adoro
- TN I.5b: Occhi belli s'io v'adoro
- TN I.6: Più non vanti la speranza
- TN I.7: Semiviva e dolente (spurious)
- TN II.1: Seguane pur che può, scoprirmi io voglio

=== Serenatas ===
- TN III.1: Nella notte più fosca
- TN III.2: Risvegliatevi, o luci mie belle

=== Antiprologues ===
- TN IV.1: Acquaviva laureata (Acquaviva delle Fonti, 1682)
- TN IV.2: Gara degli elementi in dotare li due misti (Acquaviva delle Fonti, 1682)
- TN IV.3: Le perdite di Nereo e Dori al paragone delle glorie (Acquaviva delle Fonti, 1682)

=== Operas ===
- TN V.1a: Adamiro (Naples, 1681)
- TN V.1b: Adamiro (Palermo, 1682)
- TN V.2: La Filli [La moglie del fratello] (Naples, 1682)

== Bibliography ==
- Dinko Fabris, Netti, Giovanni Cesare, in Dizionario biografico degli italiani, vol. 78, Roma, Istituto dell'Enciclopedia Italiana, 2013.
- Giovanni Cesare Netti, Cantate e serenate a una, due voci e basso continuo (Napoli, 1676-1682 ca.), ed. by Giovanni Tribuzio, Perugia, Morlacchi Editore University Press, 2019 ISBN 9788893921343.
