= Rachel Roddy =

Cook book author

Rachel Roddy (born 1972) is a food writer and cook book author from London, England, who now resides in Rome, Italy.

== Life ==
Roddy grew up in Hertfordshire and would often visit her maternal grandmother's pub in Oldham.

Roddy originally trained as an actor and moved to Italy in 2005 and worked as a waitress while learning Italian. She now lives in the Testaccio district of Rome, with her partner and son. She began food writing on her blog, Rachel Eats in 2008. She was soon spotted by The Guardian and now writes a weekly column for its Feast supplement.

== Books ==
She is the author of three Italian cookbooks: the André Simone Memorial Fund Award-winning Five Quarters (published 2015), Two Kitchens (2017), and her latest cookbook, An A–Z of Pasta (2021).

Five Quarters was Roddy's first book, published in 2015, and focuses on the food of Rome. It won the André Simone Memorial Fund Award in 2016.

Two Kitchens looks at the food of her home in Testaccio and also of her partner Vincenzo's hometown of Gela in Sicily.

An A-Z of Pasta, is a cookery book based on various shapes of pasta and the recipes best suited to each.
