= Francesco Racanelli =

Italian doctor and writer (1904–1978)

- Born: 1904; Sannicandro di Bari, Puglia
- Died: 1978 (aged 73–74); Orbetello

Francesco Racanelli (1904–1978) was an Italian doctor, pranotherapist and writer, and the originator of an unconventional therapy that he called in Italian: medicina bioradiante or "bio-radiant medicine".

== Biography ==
Francesco Racanelli was born in 1904 in Sannicandro di Bari, Puglia, Italy. He believed that he possessed a gift which, much later in his life, he called "bio-radiant energy", and that there was a "vital fluid" which "emanated" from "particularly gifted people". He began to practice on people. As a result, he was prosecuted for the illegal practice of medicine. To avoid further legal problems, he studied medicine and qualified as a doctor. He worked as a healer and lecturer in Florence. He treated wounded people in Florence during the Liberation of Italy.

Francesco Racanelli died in Orbetello, in 1978.

== Bibliography ==
Francesco Racanelli wrote several books, some of which were translated into French and German. They include:

- Racanelli, Francesco (1939). Il dolore e la sua medicina (in Italian). Firenze: Giannini & Giovannelli. OCLC 632666065.
- Racanelli, Francesco (1948). Terra di nessuno, terra per tutti (in Italian). F. Le Monnier. OCLC 122438578.
- Racanelli, Francesco (1949). Il dono della guarigione (in Italian). Vallecchi. OCLC 758848358. French translation 1951.
- Racanelli, Francesco (1951). Medicina bioradiante (in Italian). Vallecchi. OCLC 14649906. German translation 1951.
- Racanelli, Francesco (1977). Natura e anime (in Italian). Vallecchi. OCLC 3849053. Nine stories, 1945–1975.
- Racanelli, Francesco (1978). L'altra medicina (in Italian) (3rd ed.). Vallecchi. OCLC 4777902.
