= Union of Italian Provinces =

- Unione delle Province d'Italia
- Abbreviation: UPI
- Formation: 1908; 118 years ago
- Type: Advocacy group
- Headquarters: Rome, Italy
- President: Enzo Lattuca
- Affiliations: Council of European Municipalities and Regions

The Union of Italian Provinces (Italian: Unione delle Province Italiane) (UPI) is an association dedicated to ensuring the representation of Italian provinces in technical and political matters. All provinces are part of this union, except for Trentino, South Tyrol and Aosta Valley.

It was established in 1908.

== Presidents ==
List of national presidents.

President	Term of office		Party	Province
President	Start	End	Party	Province
Giuseppe Cerutti	1908	?	?	Venice
?	?	?	?	?
Lorenzo Ria	29 July 1999	16 November 2004	PPI / DL	Lecce
Fabio Melilli	16 November 2004	12 February 2008	DL / PD	Rieti
Giuseppe Castiglione	12 February 2008	31 October 2012	FI / PdL	Catania
Antonino Saitta	31 October 2012	27 June 2014	PD	Turin
Alessandro Pastacci	27 June 2014	15 May 2015	Ind. (centre-left)	Mantua
Achille Variati	15 May 2015	13 May 2018	PD	Vicenza
Michele De Pascale	13 May 2018	10 December 2024	PD	Ravenna
Pasquale Gandolfi	10 December 2024	13 May 2026	PD	Bergamo
Enzo Lattuca	13 May 2026	Incumbent	PD	Forlì-Cesena
