= Lake of Rascino =

Lake in Lazio, Italy

Lago di Rascino
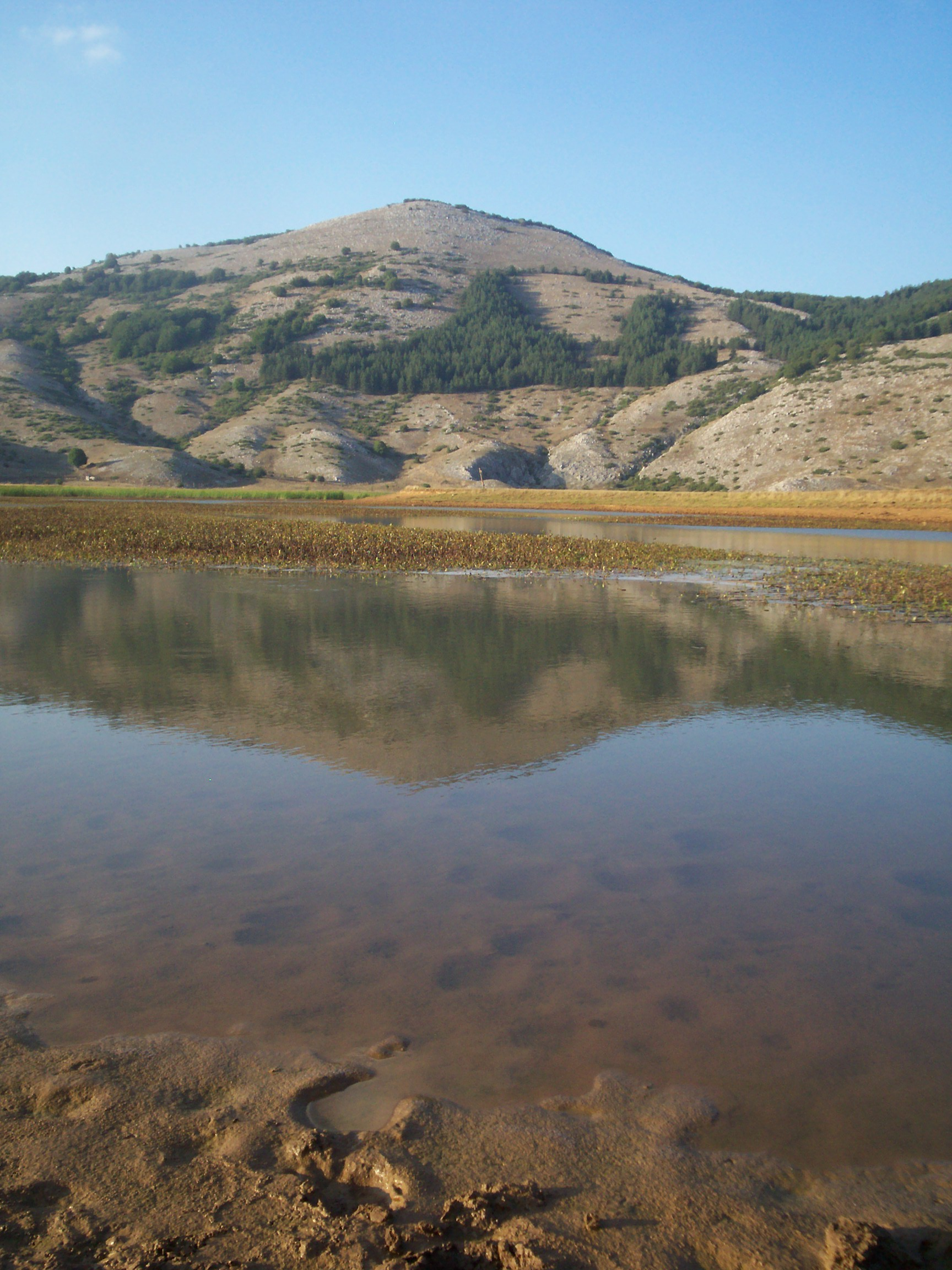
- Lago di Rascino

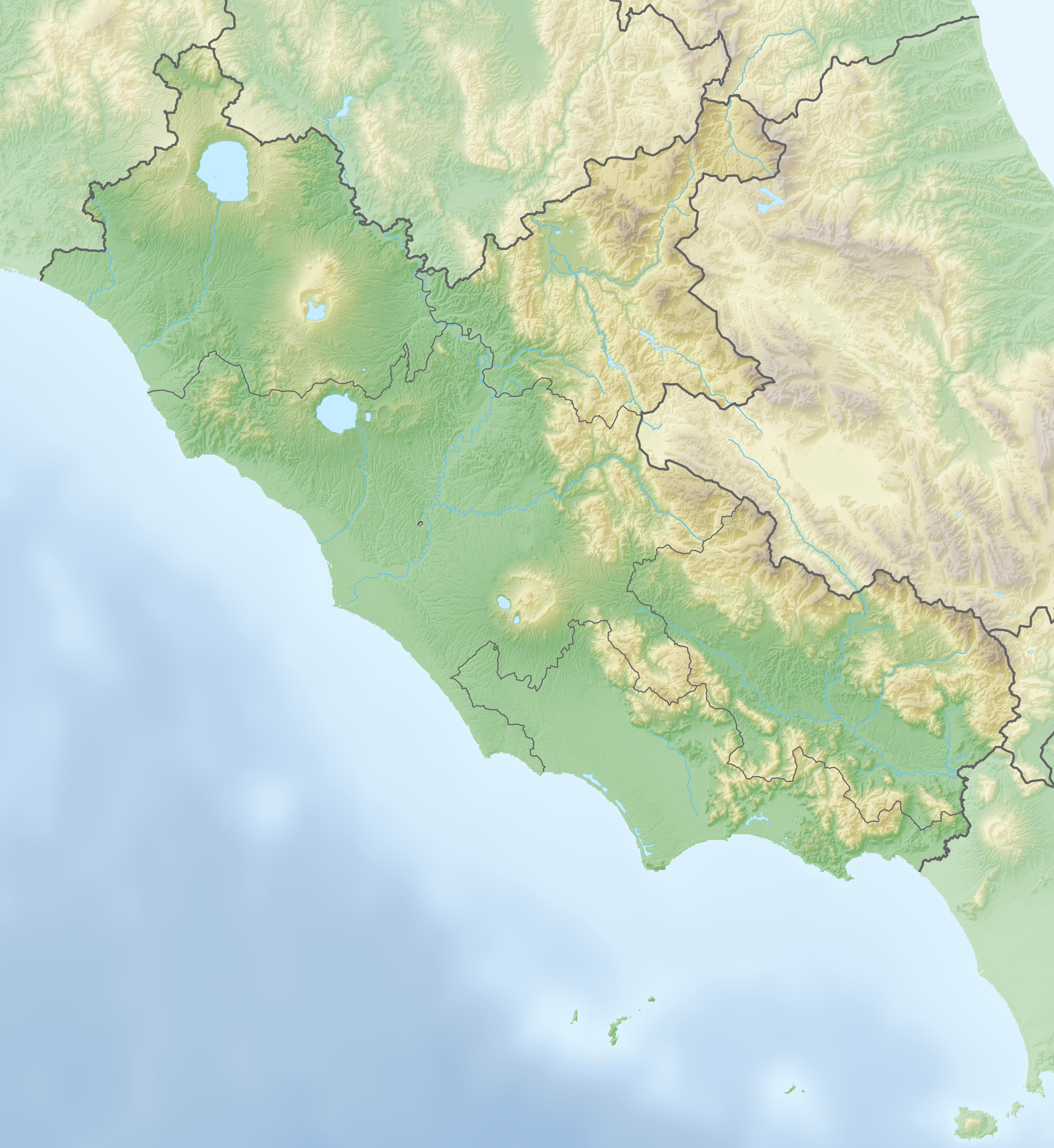
- Location within Lazio
- Location: Province of Rieti, Lazio
- Coordinates: 42°20′52″N 13°08′52″E
- Basin countries: Italy
- Surface area: 28.3 ha (70 acres)
- Max. depth: 5 m (16 ft)
- Surface elevation: 1,146 m (3,760 ft)

Lago di Rascino is a karst lake mountain in the Province of Rieti, Lazio, Italy, in the territory of Fiamignano, in Cicolano.

At an elevation of 1146 m, its surface area is 0.283 km^{2}. It has a depth of 5 meters.

== Description ==
It is located at the edge of the homonymous large karst plateau, the plateau Rascino, along with other small bodies of water less seasonal. With no tributaries, the reservoir collects rainwater and snow and the presence of karst sinkholes allows the outflow.

== Flora and fauna ==
- Pike
- Tench
- Rudd
- Carp
- Perch
- Carling
