= Mariano Calisse =

Italian politician (born 1982)

President of the Province of Rieti
- In office 1 November 2018 – 29 January 2023
- Preceded by: Giuseppe Rinaldi
- Succeeded by: Roberta Cuneo

Mayor of Borgorose
- Incumbent
- Assumed office 27 May 2013
- Preceded by: Michele Pasquale Nicolai

Personal details
- Born: 17 May 1982 (age 44) Avezzano, Abruzzo, Italy
- Party: Lega

Mariano Calisse (born 17 May 1982) is an Italian politician who served as president of the Province of Rieti from 2018 to 2024. He has also served as mayor of Borgorose since 2013.

In 2018, Calisse was elected president of the Province of Rieti as the Lega candidate of the centre-right coalition, defeating centre-left candidate Carmine Rinaldi, mayor of Fiamignano. Calisse received 53% of the vote, compared with approximately 47% for Rinaldi.

In April 2025, Calisse was elected to the Federal Council of the Lega.
