= Fabio Melilli =

Italian politician (born 1958)

- Melilli in 2018

Member of the Chamber of Deputies
- In office 15 March 2013 – 12 October 2022
- Constituency: Lazio 2

President of the Province of Rieti
- In office 28 June 2004 – 12 February 2013
- Preceded by: Giosuè Calabrese
- Succeeded by: Giuseppe Rinaldi

President of the Union of Italian Provinces
- In office 16 November 2004 – 12 February 2008
- Preceded by: Lorenzo Ria
- Succeeded by: Giuseppe Castiglione

Mayor of Poggio Moiano
- In office 24 April 1995 – 14 June 2004
- Preceded by: Angelo Maria Cicolani
- Succeeded by: Sante Desideri

Personal details
- Born: 4 April 1958 (age 68) Poggio Moiano, Province of Rieti, Italy
- Party: Christian Democracy; Italian People's Party; The Daisy; Democratic Party
- Education: Sapienza University of Rome
- Occupation: Business executive

Fabio Melilli (born 4 April 1958) is an Italian politician who served as president of the Province of Rieti from 2004 to 2013 and a member of the Chamber of Deputies from 2013 to 2022. He also served as mayor of Poggio Moiano and president of the Union of Italian Provinces. He was regional secretary of the Democratic Party in Lazio from 2014 to 2018.

== Biography ==
A member of the Christian Democracy (Italy) party—for which he served as provincial secretary and member of the National Council—he was a city council member, city councilor in Poggio Moiano, and councilor for the Mountain Community, and served as mayor of Poggio Moiano from April 23, 1995, to June 13, 1999, and then, after being reelected for a second term, until 2004.
