= Angela Carluccio =

Italian politician

Mayor of Brindisi
- In office 22 June 2016 – 27 May 2017
- Preceded by: Cosimo Consales
- Succeeded by: Riccardo Rossi

Personal details
- Born: 26 October 1972 (age 53) Brindisi, Apulia, Italy
- Party: Conservatives and Reformists
- Education: University of Bari
- Profession: Lawyer

Angela Carluccio (born 26 October 1972 in Brindisi) is an Italian politician.

She ran for the office of Mayor of Brindisi at the 2016 local elections, supported by a centrist coalition. She won and took her office on 22 June 2016. She resigned after a motion of no confidence and left office on 27 May 2017.

Carluccio is the first woman to be elected Mayor of Brindisi.

== Biography ==
After winning the coalition primaries as a candidate on Massimo Ferrarese “Noi Centro” list, she ran in the 2016 municipal elections with the support of the “Noi Centro” list, the Conservatives and Reformists (Italy), and the civic lists “Impegno Sociale,” “Democratici per Brindisi,” and “Brindisi Prima di Tutto.” She won the runoff election with 51.13% of the vote against 48.87% for her opponent, the center-left candidate Fernando Marino, prevailing by a margin of approximately 646 votes and becoming the first woman to lead the city.

In 2020, she ran in the regional elections in Puglia on the “Senso Civico” ticket in support of incumbent Governor Michele Emiliano. She received 753 votes but was not elected.

== See also ==
- 2016 Italian local elections
- List of mayors of Brindisi

Political offices
Preceded by Cosimo Consales	Mayor of Brindisi; 2016–2017	Succeeded by Riccardo Rossi
