= Alessandro Pastacci =

Italian politician (born 1974)

President of the Province of Mantua
- In office 1 June 2011 – 1 September 2016
- Preceded by: Maurizio Fontanili
- Succeeded by: Beniamino Morselli

President of the Union of Italian Provinces
- In office 27 June 2014 – 15 May 2015
- Preceded by: Antonino Saitta
- Succeeded by: Achille Variati

Mayor of Quistello
- In office 14 May 2001 – 17 May 2011
- Preceded by: Enzo Gemelli
- Succeeded by: Luca Malavasi

Personal details
- Born: 21 January 1974 (age 52) Quistello, Lombardy, Italy
- Education: University of Bologna
- Profession: Financial consultant

Alessandro Pastacci (born 21 January 1974) is an Italian politician who served as president of the Province of Mantua from 2011 to 2016.

== Career ==
Pastacci entered local politics in 1997 as a municipal councillor and youth policy assessor in his hometown, Quistello. He was elected mayor in 2001 and re-elected in 2006.

In 2011 he was elected president of the Province of Mantua, supported by a centre-left coalition, defeating Gianni Fava in the runoff with 57.27% of the vote. During his term as provincial president, he was elected national president of the Union of Italian Provinces in June 2014 and joined the Italian delegation to the European Committee of the Regions in 2015.

In 2016, Pastacci stood as a candidate for mayor of San Benedetto Po with a civic list, receiving 32.52% of the vote. He subsequently served as a municipal councillor until 2021.
