= Antonio Maria Gabellone =

Italian politician (born 1959)

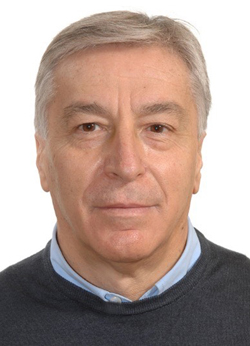

Member of the Chamber of Deputies
- Incumbent
- Assumed office 2 December 2024
- Preceded by: Raffaele Fitto

Member of the Regional Council of Apulia
- In office 30 October 2020 – 17 December 2024

President of the Province of Lecce
- In office 23 June 2009 – 7 November 2018
- Preceded by: Giovanni Pellegrino
- Succeeded by: Stefano Minerva

Mayor of Tuglie
- In office 24 April 1995 – 14 June 2004
- Preceded by: Otello Petruzzi
- Succeeded by: Daniele Ria

Personal details
- Born: 16 September 1959 (age 67) Gallipoli, Province of Lecce, Italy
- Party: Christian Democracy; Forza Italia; The People of Freedom; Brothers of Italy
- Education: University of Urbino
- Profession: Pharmacist

Antonio Maria Gabellone (born 16 September 1959) is an Italian politician of Brothers of Italy serving a member of the Chamber of Deputies since 2024. He previously served as a member of the Regional Council of Apulia from 2020 to 2024 and as president of the Province of Lecce from 2009 to 2018.
