= Roberta Cuneo =

Italian politician (born 1970)

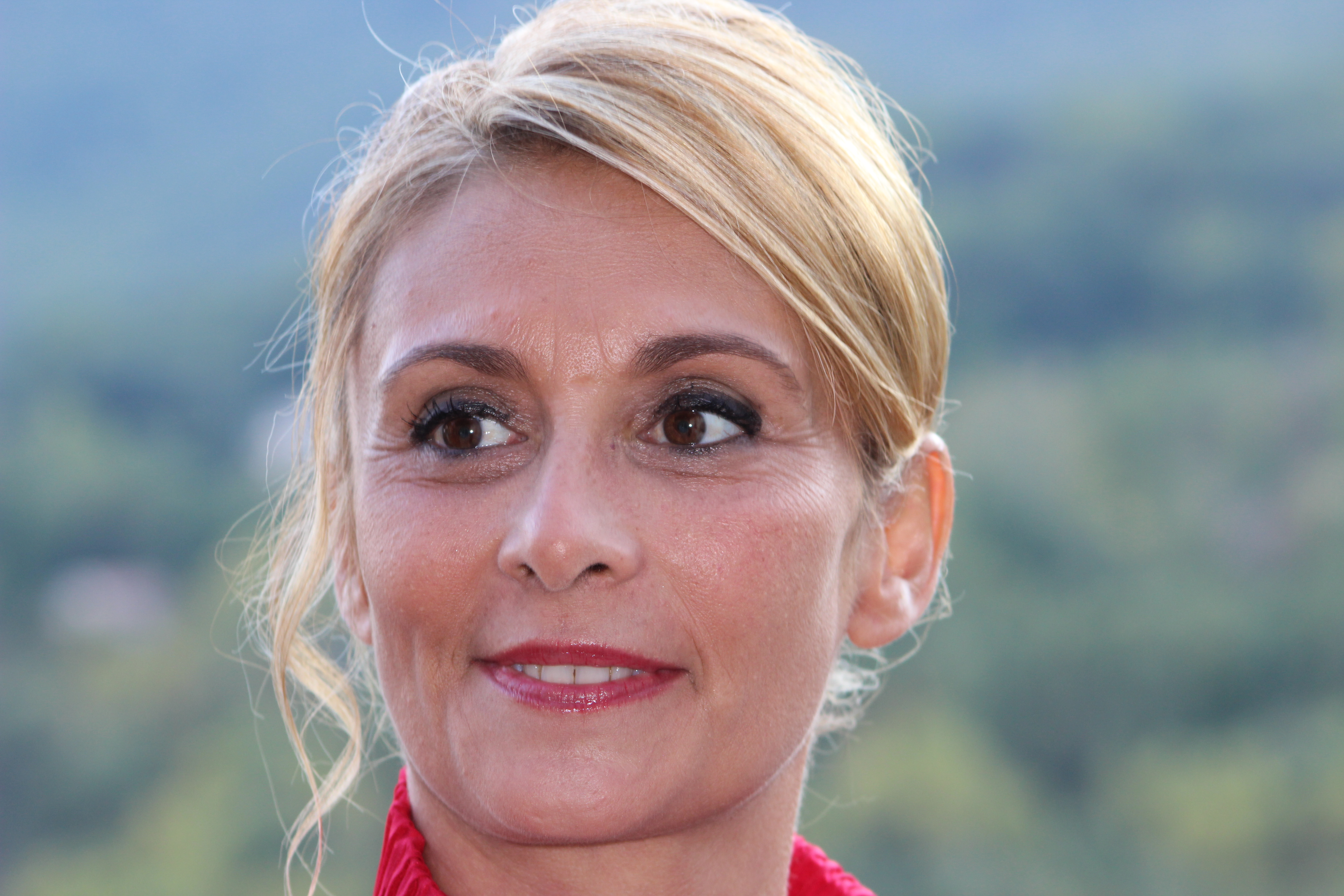

President of the Province of Rieti
- Incumbent
- Assumed office 29 January 2023
- Preceded by: Mariano Calisse

Mayor of Fara in Sabina
- Incumbent
- Assumed office 22 September 2020
- Preceded by: Davide Basilicata

Personal details
- Born: 2 January 1970 (age 56) Rome, Italy
- Party: Lega
- Education: Teacher

Roberta Cuneo (born 2 January 1970) is an Italian politician serving as president of the Province of Rieti since 2023. He has served as mayor of Fara in Sabina since 2020.

Cuneo joined the Lega party. In January 2023, she was elected president of the Province of Rieti for the centre-right coalition, defeating centre-left candidate Filippo Lucentini, mayor of Fiamignano, with 47,146 weighted votes (67%).
