= List of presidents of the Province of Lecce =

President of the Province of Lecce
- Presidente della Provincia di Lecce
- Incumbent; Fabio Tarantino since 2 February 2026
- Term length: 4 years
- Inaugural holder: Angelantonio Fumarola
- Formation: 1889

The president of the Province of Lecce is the head of the provincial government in Lecce, Apulia, Italy. The president oversees the administration of the province, coordinates the activities of the municipalities, and represents the province in regional and national matters.

Since February 2026, the office has been held by Fabio Tarantino of Con Emiliano.

== List ==
=== Presidents of the Provincial Deputation (1889–1927) ===
No.	Portrait	Name	Term		Party
No.	Portrait	Name	Start	End	Party
1		Angelantonio Fumarola	1889	1892	?
2		Vincenzo Gervasi	1892	1896	?
3		Gaetano Capozza	1896	1899	?
(2)		Vincenzo Gervasi	1899	1900	?
4		Domenico Caputo	1900	1903	?
5		Ferdinando Biscosi	1903	1905	?
6		Luigi Arditi	1905	1908	?
(5)		Ferdinando Biscosi	1908	1909	?
7		Domenico Daniele	1909	1912	?
8		Pietro Demarco	1912	1914	?
9		Federico Balsamo	1914	?	?

=== Presidents of the Provincial Rectorate (1927–1943) ===
No.	Portrait	Name	Term		Party
No.	Portrait	Name	Start	End	Party
1		Nicola Lopez y Royo	1927	1943	National Fascist Party

=== Presidents of the Province (1951–present) ===
No.	Portrait	Name	Term		Party
No.	Portrait	Name	Start	End	Party
1		Martino Caroli	16 July 1951	1956	Christian Democracy
1		Martino Caroli	1956	1958	Christian Democracy
2		Girolamo Vergine	1958	17 November 1960	Christian Democracy
2		Girolamo Vergine	18 December 1960	14 March 1965	Christian Democracy
3		Egidio Grasso	15 March 1965	20 September 1970	Christian Democracy
3		Egidio Grasso	21 September 1970	28 October 1975	Christian Democracy
4		Pietro Licchetta	29 October 1975	25 September 1980	Christian Democracy
5		Mario Ferrante	26 September 1980	13 December 1983	Christian Democracy
6		Cosimo De Benedetto	24 April 1984	9 January 1985	Christian Democracy
7		Antonio Biasi	18 February 1985	11 May 1985	Christian Democracy
–		Martire Schito (acting)	15 May 1985	4 October 1985	Christian Democracy
8		Giacinto Urso	5 October 1985	9 August 1990	Christian Democracy
9		Rosario Giorgio Costa	10 August 1990	30 April 1993	Christian Democracy
10		Luigi Marcelli	28 June 1993	8 May 1995	Christian Democracy
11		Lorenzo Ria	8 May 1995	14 June 1999	Italian People's Party; The Daisy
11		Lorenzo Ria	14 June 1999	1 July 2004	Italian People's Party; The Daisy
12		Giovanni Pellegrino	1 July 2004	23 June 2009	Democrats of the Left; Democratic Party
13		Antonio Maria Gabellone	23 June 2009	14 October 2014	The People of Freedom; Forza Italia
13		Antonio Maria Gabellone	14 October 2014	7 November 2018	The People of Freedom; Forza Italia
14		Stefano Minerva	7 November 2018	10 November 2022	Democratic Party
14		Stefano Minerva	10 November 2022	22 October 2025	Democratic Party
–		Fabio Tarantino	22 October 2025	2 February 2026	Con Emiliano
15		Fabio Tarantino	2 February 2026	Incumbent	Con Emiliano

== Sources ==
- "Storia amministrativa dell'ente". Ministero dell'Interno.
- Menichini, Piera (2005). "I presidenti delle Province dall'Unità alla Grande guerra: repertorio analitico". Storia Amministrazione Costituzione (13): 257–258.
