= Giuseppe Grosso =

Italian jurist and politician (1906–1973)

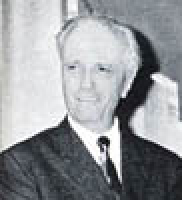
- Grosso in 1966

Mayor of Turin
- In office 20 February 1965 – 9 September 1968
- Preceded by: Luciano Jona
- Succeeded by: Andrea Guglielminetti

President of the Province of Turin
- In office 1951–1965
- Preceded by: Pietro Gambolò
- Succeeded by: Gianni Oberto Tarena

Personal details
- Born: 24 July 1906 Turin, Kingdom of Italy
- Died: 27 October 1973 (aged 67) Villach, Austria
- Occupation: Jurist

Giuseppe Grosso (24 July 1906 – 27 October 1973) was an Italian jurist and politician who served as mayor of Turin from 1965 to 1968 and as president of the Province of Turin from 1951 to 1965.
