= Riccardo Rossi (politician) =

Italian politician

Mayor of Brindisi
- In office 29 June 2018 – 1 June 2023
- Preceded by: Angela Carluccio
- Succeeded by: Giuseppe Marchionna

President of the Province of Brindisi
- In office 31 October 2018 – 6 March 2022
- Preceded by: Maurizio Bruno
- Succeeded by: Toni Matarrelli

Personal details
- Born: 7 June 1964 (age 62) Trani, Province of Bari, Italy
- Party: Green Europe (since 2022)
- Education: University of Bari
- Profession: Engineer

Riccardo Rossi (born 7 June 1964) is an Italian politician.

Rossi ran as an independent for the office of mayor of Brindisi at the 2018 Italian local elections, supported by a centre-left coalition. He won and took office on 29 June 2018.

He was elected president of the Province of Brindisi on 31 October 2018.

Political offices
Preceded by Angela Carluccio	Mayor of Brindisi; 2018-2022	Succeeded by Giuseppe Marchionna
Preceded by Maurizio Bruno	President of the Province of Brindisi; 2018-2022	Succeeded by Toni Matarrelli
