= Ivo Coccia =

Italian lawyer and politician (1891–1979)

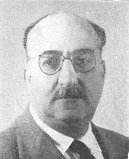

Member of the Constituent Assembly
- In office 15 July 1946 – 31 January 1948

Member of the Chamber of Deputies
- In office 1 June 1948 – 24 June 1953

President of the Province of Rieti
- In office 24 August 1946 – 21 February 1948
- Preceded by: Luigi Colarieti
- Succeeded by: Giovanni Fiori
- In office 8 October 1955 – 31 March 1958
- Preceded by: Fernando Ricca
- Succeeded by: Alberto Maria Cirese

Personal details
- Born: 23 December 1891 Rome, Kingdom of Italy
- Died: 31 July 1979 (aged 87) Rome, Italy
- Party: Christian Democracy
- Occupation: Lawyer

Ivo Coccia (23 December 1891 – 31 July 1979) was an Italian lawyer and politician. A member of the Christian Democracy and an opponent of fascism, he served as a member of the Constituent Assembly of Italy and as a deputy in the first legislature.
