= Maurizio Bruno =

Italian politician

Member of the Regional Council of Apulia
- In office 30 October 2020 – 22 Novemver 2025

President of the Province of Brindisi
- In office 13 October 2014 – 28 November 2017
- Preceded by: Massimo Ferrarese
- Succeeded by: Riccardo Rossi

Mayor of Francavilla Fontana
- In office 10 June 2014 – 28 November 2017
- Preceded by: Vincenzo Della Corte
- Succeeded by: Antonello Denuzzo

Personal details
- Born: 13 November 1966 (age 59) Francavilla Fontana, Province of Brindisi, Italy
- Party: Democratic Party of the Left; Democrats of the Left; Democratic Party

Maurizio Bruno (born 13 November 1966) is an Italian politician who served as president of the Province of Brindisi from 2014 to 2017 and as a member of the Regional Council of Apulia from 2020 to 2025.

== Career ==
Bruno was first elected to the municipal council of Francavilla Fontana in 1995 with the Democratic Party of the Left, and was subsequently re-elected in 1996, in 2001, in 2006 and in 2009. In 2004, he was elected to the Brindisi Provincial Council and became a provincial assessor in 2009. In June 2014, he was elected mayor of Francavilla Fontana as the candidate of a centre-left coalition.

In October 2014, Bruno was elected president of the Province of Brindisi. He received 62.38% of the weighted vote against 37.62% for Gianfranco Coppola, with his candidacy supported by the centre-left, the "Bruno Presidente" list and New Centre-Right.

Bruno was re-elected to the municipal council of Francavilla Fontana in 2018 and became president of the municipal council in 2023. In the 2020 Apulian regional election, he was elected to the Regional Council of Apulia on the Democratic Party list.
