= Davide Zoggia =

Italian politician (born 1964)

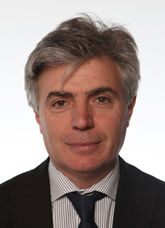

Member of the Chamber of Deputies
- In office 15 March 2013 – 22 March 2018
- Constituency: Veneto 2

President of the Province of Venice
- In office 14 June 2004 – 23 June 2009
- Preceded by: Luigino Busatto
- Succeeded by: Francesca Zaccariotto

Mayor of Jesolo
- In office 6 November 1992 – 19 August 1993
- Preceded by: Danilo Lunardelli
- Succeeded by: Renato Martin

Personal details
- Born: 29 February 1964 (age 62) Venice, Italy
- Party: PCI (until 1991); PDS (1991–1998); DS (1998–2007); PD (2007–2017); A1 (2017–2023)
- Education: Ca' Foscari University of Venice
- Occupation: Tax consultant

Davide Zoggia (born 29 February 1964) is an Italian politician who served as president of the Province of Venice from 2004 to 2009 and as a member of the Chamber of Deputies from 2013 to 2018.
