= Giuseppe Rinaldi (politician) =

Italian politician (born 1965)

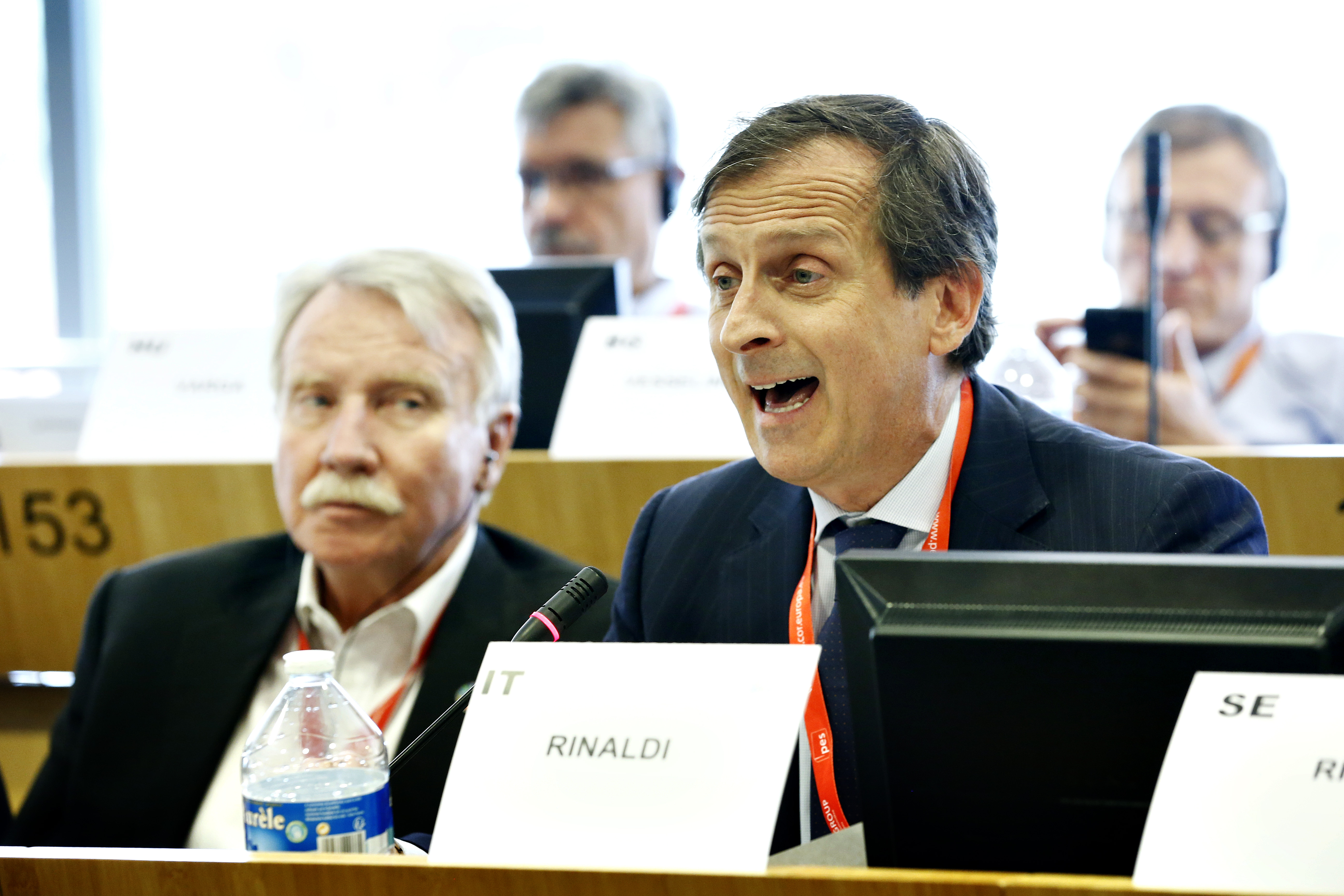
- Rinaldi in 2018

President of the Province of Rieti
- In office 13 October 2014 – 1 November 2018
- Preceded by: Fabio Melilli
- Succeeded by: Mariano Calisse

Mayor of Poggio Mirteto
- In office 24 April 1995 – 14 June 2004
- Preceded by: Pasqualino Carconi
- Succeeded by: Fabio Refrigeri

Personal details
- Born: 19 September 1965 (age 60) Rome, Italy
- Party: Democratic Party
- Occupation: Lawyer

Giuseppe Rinaldi (born 19 September 1965) is an Italian lawyer and politician who served as president of the Province of Rieti from 2014 to 2018. He also served as mayor of Poggio Mirteto from 1995 to 2004.

In 2004 he was elected to the Provincial Council of Rieti, re-confirmed in 2009. From 2004 to 2009 he served as provincial assessor for culture. In October 2014, Rinaldi was elected president of the Province of Rieti as the candidate of the centre-left coalition, defeating centre-right candidate Michele Pasquale Nicolai with 61% of the vote.
