= Giuseppe Marchionna =

Italian politician and economist (born 1953)

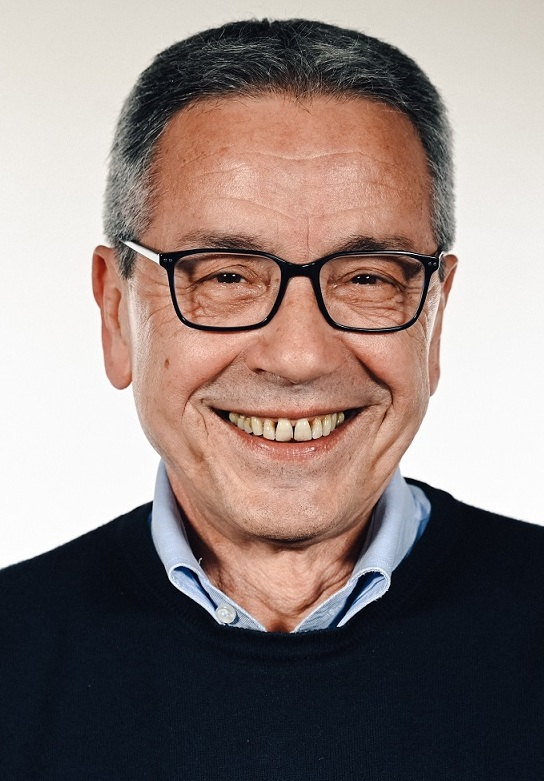

Mayor of Brindisi
- Incumbent
- Assumed office 1 June 2023
- Preceded by: Riccardo Rossi
- In office 11 August 1990 – 26 October 1992
- Preceded by: Cosimo Quaranta
- Succeeded by: Teodoro Saponaro

Personal details
- Born: 14 July 1953 (age 73) Brindisi, Italy
- Party: Centre-right independent
- Other political affiliations: PSI (till 1994); Forza Italia (1994-2001); NPSI (2001-2008)
- Education: University of Macerata
- Profession: Economist

Giuseppe Marchionna (born 14 July 1953) is an Italian politician. A centre-right independent, he serves as Mayor of Brindisi since 2023, an office he previously held from 1990 to 1992.

== Biography ==
A member of the Italian Socialist Party of Brindisi at a very young age, passionate about studies and research of an economic nature, over the years Marchionna has been involved in the elaboration of documents and publications focused on the development of the Brindisi area. He was elected city councilor of Brindisi for the first time in 1985, and then held the position of councilor for Productive Activities in 1989.

In 1990 he was elected Mayor of Brindisi and during his term he found himself facing the emergency of the exodus of the Albanians who arrived in a single day in 25,000 in the city of Brindisi, putting a strain on its resistance and management capacity. He ends his administrative mandate in October 1992.

In 2008, after abandoning active politics, he resumed his youth studies, graduating with honors in Philosophy at the University of Macerata.

On the occasion of the administrative elections of May 2023, Marchionna ran again for Mayor of Brindisi, at the head of a centre-right coalition. He won the elections in the run-off, against the centre-left candidate Roberto Fusco, becoming mayor of the city of Brindisi for the second time.

Political offices
Preceded by Cosimo Quaranta	Mayor of Brindisi; 1990-1992	Succeeded by Teodoro Saponaro
Preceded by Riccardo Rossi	Mayor of Brindisi since 2023	Incumbent
