= List of mayors of Brindisi =

Mayor of Brindisi
- Sindaco di Brindisi

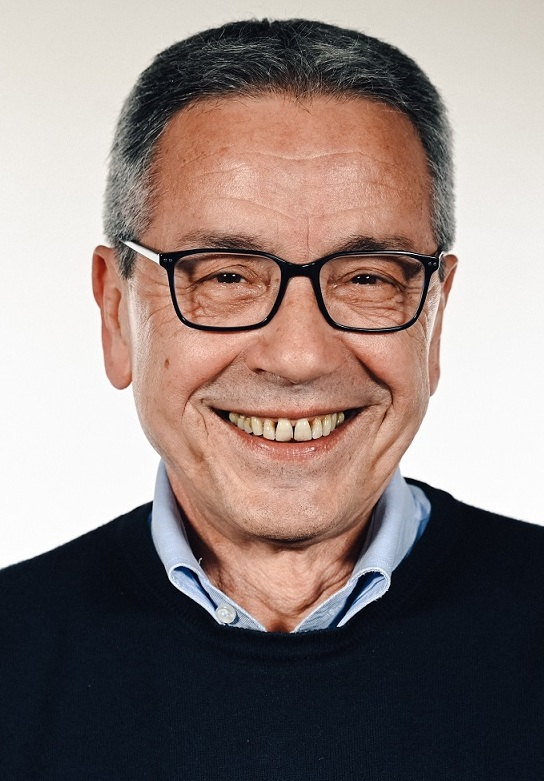
- Incumbent; Giuseppe Marchionna since 1 June 2023
- Appointer: Popular election
- Term length: 5 years, renewable once
- Formation: 1860
- Website: Official website

The mayor of Brindisi is an elected politician who, along with the Brindisi City Council, is accountable for the strategic government of Brindisi in Apulia, Italy.

The current mayor is Giuseppe Marchionna, a centre-right independent, who took office on 1 June 2023.

== Overview ==
According to the Italian Constitution, the mayor of Brindisi is member of the City Council. The mayor is elected by the population of Brindisi, who also elects the members of the City Council, controlling the mayor's policy guidelines and is able to enforce his resignation by a motion of no confidence. The mayor is entitled to appoint and release the members of his government.

Since 1994, the mayor is elected directly by Brindisi's electorate: in all mayoral elections in Italy in cities with a population higher than 15,000 the voters express a direct choice for the mayor or an indirect choice voting for the party of the candidate's coalition. If no candidate receives at least 50% of votes, the top two candidates go to a second round after two weeks. The election of the city council is based on a direct choice for the candidate with a preference vote: the candidate with the majority of the preferences is elected. The number of the seats for each party is determined proportionally.

== Italian Republic (since 1946) ==
=== City Council election (1946–1994) ===
From 1946 to 1994, the Mayor of Brindisi was elected by the City Council.

	Mayor	Term start	Term end	Party
1	Francesco Lazzaro	1946	1948	PCI
2	Vincenzo Guadalupi	1948	1951	DC
(1)	Francesco Lazzaro	1951	1955	PCI
3	Antonio Di Giulio	1955	1956	PSI
4	Manlio Poto	1956	1959	DC
5	Vitantonio Bruno	1959	1965	DC
6	Giuseppe Sasso	1965	1967	DC
7	Francesco Arina	1967	1971	DC
8	Francesco Lo Parco	1971	1975	DC
(7)	Francesco Arina	1975	1980	DC
9	Bruno Carluccio	1980	1985	DC
10	Errico Ortese	1985	1987	PSI
11	Cosimo Ennio Masiello	1987	1989	PCI
12	Cosimo Quaranta	1989	1990	DC
13	Giuseppe Marchionna	1990	1992	PSI
14	Teodoro Saponaro	1992	1993	PDS
(7)	Francesco Arina	1993	1994	DC

=== Direct election (since 1994) ===
Since 1994, under provisions of new local administration law, the Mayor of Brindisi is chosen by direct election, originally every four, then every five years.

	Mayor	Term start	Term end	Party	Coalition	Election
15	Michele Errico	5 December 1994	18 December 1995 (Note: Resigned.)	PDS	PDS • AD • PPI • PS • CS	1994
Special Prefectural Commissioner tenure (18 December 1995 – 10 June 1996)
16	Lorenzo Maggi	10 June 1996	9 June 1997 (Note: Resigned. The deputy mayor Antonio Taveri (FI) held the office till a new municipal election was held.)	CDU	FI • AN • CCD • CDU	1996
17	Giovanni Antonino	17 November 1997	28 May 2002	FI; Ind	FI • AN • CCD • CDU • PRI	1997
17	Giovanni Antonino	28 May 2002	5 November 2003 (Note: Resigned after being arrested with the charges of corruption.)	FI; Ind	DS • DL • PRC	2002
Special Prefectural Commissioner tenure (5 November 2003 – 14 June 2004)
18	Domenico Mennitti	14 June 2004	23 June 2009	AN; PdL	FI • AN • UDC • PRI	2004
18	Domenico Mennitti	23 June 2009	1 September 2011 (Note: Resigned citing health reasons.)	AN; PdL	PdL • PRI	2009
Special Prefectural Commissioner tenure (1 September 2011 – 9 May 2012)
19	Cosimo Consales	9 May 2012	11 February 2016 (Note: Resigned after being arrested with the charges of corruption.)	PD	PD • UDC • PRI • SEL	2012
Special Prefectural Commissioner tenure (11 February 2016 – 22 June 2016)
20	Angela Carluccio	22 June 2016	27 May 2017 (Note: Removed from office after the City Council passed a motion of no confidence against her.)	CoR	CoR • Ind	2016
Special Prefectural Commissioner tenure (27 May 2017 – 29 June 2018)
21	Riccardo Rossi	29 June 2018	1 June 2023	EV	PD • LeU • EV	2018
(13)	Giuseppe Marchionna	1 June 2023	Incumbent	Ind	FI • FdI • PRI • UDC • Lega	2023
