= Gianni Oberto Tarena =

Italian lawyer and politician (1902–1980)

President of Piedmont
- In office 21 December 1973 – 21 July 1975
- Preceded by: Edoardo Calleri di Sala
- Succeeded by: Aldo Viglione

President of the Regional Council of Piedmont
- In office 9 March 1972 – 21 December 1973
- Preceded by: Paolo Battino Vittorelli
- Succeeded by: Aldo Viglione

Member of the Regional Council of Piedmont
- In office 7 June 1970 – 9 January 1980

President of the Province of Turin
- In office 31 May 1965 – 13 July 1970
- Preceded by: Giuseppe Grosso
- Succeeded by: Elio Borgogno

Personal details
- Born: 9 September 1902 Brosso, Province of Turin, Kingdom of Italy
- Died: 12 January 1980 (aged 77) Ivrea, Piedmont, Italy
- Party: Christian Democracy
- Occupation: Lawyer

Gianni Oberto Tarena (9 September 1902 – 12 January 1980) was an Italian lawyer and politician. A member of the Christian Democracy, he served as president of Piedmont from 1973 to 1975, president of the Regional Council of Piedmont from 1972 to 1973, and president of the Province of Turin from 1965 to 1970.
