= List of presidents of the Province of Brindisi =

President of the Province of Brindisi
- Presidente della Provincia di Brindisi
- Incumbent; Elio Ciccarese since 28 September 2026
- Term length: 4 years
- Formation: 1927

The president of the Province of Brindisi is the head of the provincial government in Brindisi, Apulia, Italy. The president oversees the administration of the province, coordinates the activities of the municipalities, and represents the province in regional and national matters. It was created in 1927.

Since September 2026, the office has been held by the Elio Ciccarese of the centre-left coalition.

== List ==
=== Presidents of the Royal Commission (1927–1929) ===
No.	Portrait	Name	Term of office		Party
No.	Portrait	Name	Start	End	Party
1		Antonio Mancarella	19 January 1927	28 April 1929	National Fascist Party

=== Presidents of the Provincial Rectorate (1929–1944) ===
No.	Portrait	Name	Term of office		Party
No.	Portrait	Name	Start	End	Party
1		Simone Giuseppe	28 April 1929	15 November 1937	National Fascist Party
2		Giovanni De Simone	15 November 1937	2 January 1940	National Fascist Party
–		Pier Paolo Pietrabissa	2 January 1940	8 January 1941	Royal commissioner
–		Giacomo Perrone	8 January 1941	8 February 1942	Prefectural commissioner
–		Giuseppe Gazzilli	8 February 1942	9 November 1942	Prefectural commissioner
–		Lorenzo Mugnozza	9 November 1942	4 October 1943	Prefectural commissioner
–		Teodoro De Castro	4 October 1943	14 June 1944	Prefectural commissioner

=== Presidents of the Provincial Deputation (1944–1951) ===
No.	Portrait	Name	Term of office		Party
No.	Portrait	Name	Start	End	Party
1		Giovanni Stefanelli	14 June 1944	12 April 1947	
–		Giuseppe Nicoly	12 April 1947	30 September 1948	Prefectural commissioner
2		Antonio Perrino	30 September 1948	1951	

=== Presidents of the Province (1951–present) ===
No.	Portrait	Name	Term of office		Party
No.	Portrait	Name	Start	End	Party
1		Antonio Perrino	1951	11 April 1961	
2		Vincenzo Fiori	11 April 1961	15 February 1965	
3		Vincenzo Palma	15 February 1965	5 October 1970	
4		Ubaldo Rini	5 October 1970	16 December 1975	
5		Francesco Clarizia	16 December 1975	29 December 1984	
–		Arcangelo Li Calzi	29 December 1984	18 October 1985	Prefectural commissioner
6		Nicola Melpignano	18 October 1985	7 November 1987	Christian Democracy
7		Luigi De Michele	7 November 1987	11 August 1990	Italian Socialist Party
8		Vito Punzi	11 August 1990	7 February 1991	Italian Communist Party
9		Cosimo Verola	7 February 1991	11 October 1991	Christian Democracy
(7)		Luigi De Michele	11 October 1991	9 April 1993	Italian Socialist Party
10		Giuseppe Santoro	9 April 1993	23 June 1993	Italian Socialist Party
(7)		Luigi De Michele	23 June 1993	3 May 1995	Italian Socialist Party
11		Nicola Frugis	3 May 1995	14 June 1999	Forza Italia
11		Nicola Frugis	14 June 1999	3 July 2004	Forza Italia
12		Michele Errico	3 July 2004	1 July 2009	Independent (centre-left)
13		Massimo Ferrarese	1 July 2009	23 October 2012	Independent (centre-left)
–		Cesare Castelli	23 October 2012	13 October 2014	Prefectural commissioner
14		Maurizio Bruno	13 October 2014	4 December 2017	Democratic Party
15		Riccardo Rossi	31 October 2018	31 December 2021	Independent (left)
16		Toni Matarrelli	6 March 2022	20 October 2025	Independent (centre-left)
17		Angelo Pomes	15 March 2026	27 April 2026	Democratic Party
–		Elio Ciccarese	27 April 2026	28 September 2026	Independent (centre-left)
18		Elio Ciccarese	28 September 2026	Incumbent	Independent (centre-left)

== Sources ==
- "Presidenti e Segretari Generali dal 1927". Provincia di Brindisi. 10 September 2008.
- "Storia amministrativa dell'ente". Ministero dell'Interno.
