= Pasquale Gandolfi =

Italian politician (born 1975)

President of the Province of Bergamo
- In office 19 December 2021 – 15 March 2026
- Preceded by: Gianfranco Gafforelli
- Succeeded by: Gianfranco Gafforelli

President of the Union of Italian Provinces
- In office 10 December 2024 – 13 May 2026
- Preceded by: Michele De Pascale
- Succeeded by: Enzo Lattuca

Mayor of Treviolo
- Incumbent
- Assumed office 26 May 2014

Personal details
- Born: Pasquale Giovanni Gandolfi; 3 December 1975 (age 50) Bergamo, Lombardy, Italy
- Party: Democratic Party
- Education: Polytechnic University of Milan
- Occupation: Architect

Pasquale Giovanni Gandolfi (born 3 December 1975) is an Italian politician who served as president of the Province of Bergamo from 2021 to 2026. He also has served as mayor of Treviolo since 2014.

== Life and career ==
Gandolfi was born in Bergamo, Lombardy, in 1975. He graduated in architecture from the Polytechnic University of Milan and works as a self-employed architect.

He entered local politics in Treviolo, where he was elected to the municipal council in 2009. He was elected mayor in May 2014 and re-elected in May 2019. Within the Democratic Party, Gandolfi served as provincial head for territorial, mobility and infrastructure issues from 2010 to 2013 and subsequently became responsible for labour policy. He joined the party's provincial secretariat and directorate in 2011 and became provincial deputy secretary in 2013. From 2012 to 2014, he chaired the Landscape Commission of the Parco dei Colli di Bergamo.

Gandolfi was elected to the Provincial Council of Bergamo in October 2014 and was re-elected in 2016 and 2018 with the highest number of preference votes. From 2014, he was responsible for roads, infrastructure, major works and public property, while from 2018 he held the provincial portfolios for the budget, civil protection and relations with regional and national institutions. He served as vice president of the province from 2016 to 2021, acting as president after the resignation of Gianfranco Gafforelli in October 2021.

In December 2021, Gandolfi was elected president of the Province of Bergamo with 58,412 weighted votes. From 2019, Gandolfi was a member of the national executive of the Union of Italian Provinces (UPI). In 2024, he became vice president of the Council of Local Autonomies of Lombardy. In December 2024, he was elected president of UPI.

Gandolfi ran for a second term as provincial president in March 2026, but was defeated by former president Gafforelli, the centre-right candidate, who received 52% of the weighted vote against Gandolfi's 48%.

In 2024, he was elected mayor of Treviolo for the third consecutive term.
