= Giovanni Chiggiato =

Italian entrepreneur, writer and politician (1876–1923)

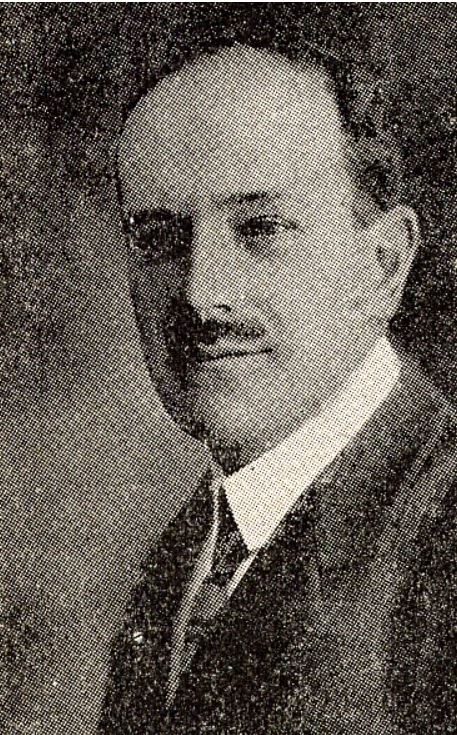

Member of the Chamber of Deputies
- In office 1921–1923
- Constituency: Venice–Treviso

President of the Province of Venice
- In office 1914–1920
- Preceded by: Pietro Berna

Personal details
- Born: 14 June 1876 Venice, Kingdom of Italy
- Died: 29 March 1923 (aged 46) Venice, Kingdom of Italy
- Education: University of Padua
- Occupation: Entrepreneur, writer

Giovanni Chiggiato (14 June 1876 – 29 March 1923) was an Italian entrepreneur, writer and politician.

== Life and career ==
Born in Venice in 1876, Chiggiato graduated in law from the University of Padua and initially devoted himself to literature and journalism, publishing several collections of poetry and the novel Il figlio vostro, which won a literary competition organized by the Society of Italian Authors in 1912. He was also an accomplished mountaineer and was described as the "father of Venetian mountaineering", taking an active role in the local activities of the Italian Alpine Club.

Chiggiato entered politics through the liberal movement and the Italian Nationalist Association, becoming a member of its central council after the association was founded in 1910. He was elected to the Provincial Council of Venice in 1912 and served as president of the deputation from 1914 to 1920. An interventionist during World War I, he volunteered for military service and served in intelligence and operational assignments with the 4th Army, aided by his knowledge of German and his mountaineering experience.

After the war, Chiggiato continued to support Italian nationalist positions, particularly concerning the Adriatic and Fiume. He unsuccessfully contested the 1919 general election, but was elected to the Chamber of Deputies in 1921 for the Venice–Treviso constituency as part of the National Bloc coalition. In parliament he joined the agrarian parliamentary group and participated in the National Agrarian Party initiative. He also served on the Committee on Internal Affairs and spoke on agricultural, public works and education issues. In November 1922, he voted in favour of the Mussolini government by supporting the Terzaghi motion of confidence.

Chiggiato died in Venice on 29 March 1923 from complications following a road accident.
