= Fabio Tarantino =

Italian politician (born 1982)

President of the Province of Lecce
- Incumbent
- Assumed office 2 February 2026
- Preceded by: Stefano Minerva

Mayor of Martano
- Incumbent
- Assumed office 1 June 2015
- Preceded by: Massimo Coricciati

Personal details
- Born: 8 February 1982 (age 44) Martano, Apulia, Italy

Fabio Tarantino (born 8 February 1982) is an Italian politician serving as president of the Province of Lecce since 2026. He has served as mayor of Martano since 2015.

In the 2026 provincial election, Tarantino, supported by the centre-left broad coalition known as Con, was elected president of the Province of Lecce with 53.67% of the weighted vote, defeating centre-right candidate Adriana Poli Bortone, who received 46.32%.
