= Lorenzo Ria =

Italian politician (born 1954)

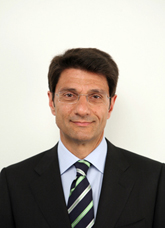

Member of the Chamber of Deputies
- In office 28 April 2008 – 14 March 2013
- In office 2 November 2004 – 27 April 2006

Member of the Senate of the Republic
- In office 4 July 2007 – 28 April 2008

President of the Province of Lecce
- In office 8 May 1995 – 14 June 2004
- Preceded by: Luigi Marcelli
- Succeeded by: Giovanni Pellegrino

Mayor of Taviano
- In office 19 August 1980 – 28 April 1997
- Succeeded by: Francesco Longo

Personal details
- Born: Lorenzo Emilio Ria; 17 May 1954 (age 72) Taviano, Province of Lecce, Italy
- Party: Democratic Party (since 2017)
- Other political affiliations: DC (1980–1994); PPI (1994–2002); DL (2002–2007); PD (2007–2009); UdC (2009–2012); CD (2012–2017)
- Education: University of Bari
- Profession: Lawyer

Lorenzo Emilio Ria (born 17 May 1954) is an Italian politician and lawyer of the Democratic Party. He served in both houses of the Italian Parliament, first as a member of the Chamber of Deputies from 2004 to 2006, then as a senator from 2007 to 2008, and again as a deputy from 2008 to 2013. He was also mayor of Taviano and president of the Province of Lecce.
