= Ettore Pirovano =

Italian politician (1949–2025)

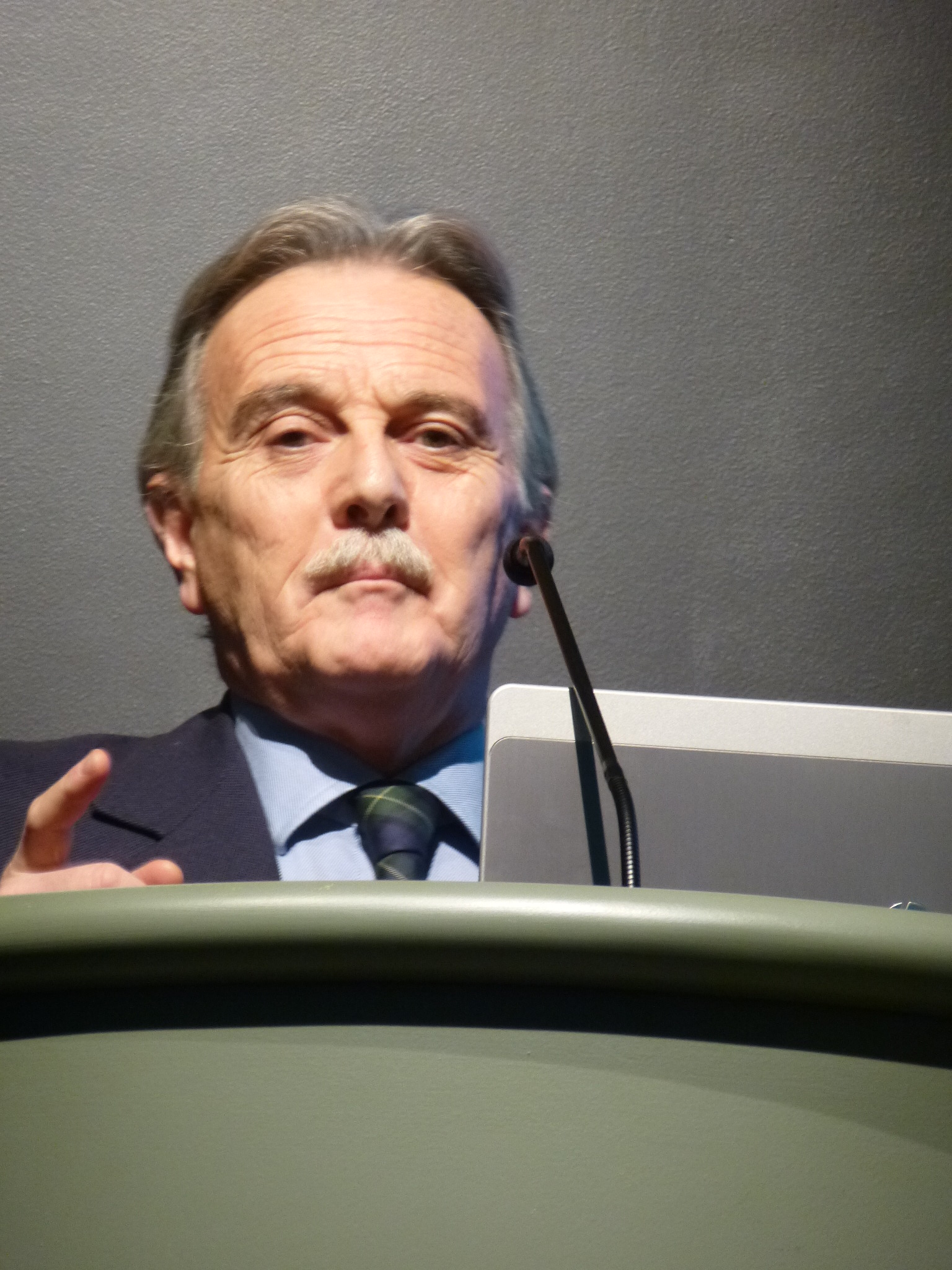

President of the Province of Bergamo
- In office 8 June 2009 – 28 September 2014
- Preceded by: Valerio Bettoni
- Succeeded by: Matteo Rossi

Member of the Chamber of Deputies
- In office 29 April 2008 – 21 December 2011
- In office 9 May 1996 – 29 May 2001

Member of the Senate of the Republic
- In office 30 May 2001 – 28 April 2008

Mayor of Caravaggio
- In office 28 April 1997 – 30 May 2006
- Preceded by: Pierluigi Radaelli
- Succeeded by: Giuseppe Prevedini

Personal details
- Born: Ettore Pietro Pirovano; 7 July 1949 Caravaggio, Province of Bergamo, Italy
- Died: 17 September 2025 (aged 76) Camaiore, Tuscany, Italy
- Party: Lega Nord
- Profession: Management consultant

Ettore Pietro Pirovano (7 July 1949 – 17 September 2025) was an Italian politician. A member of the Lega Nord, he served as mayor of Caravaggio from 1997 to 2006, senator from 2001 to 2008, and member of the Chamber of Deputies during the 13th and 16th legislatures. He was president of the Province of Bergamo from 2009 to 2014.
