= Giacinto Urso =

Italian politician (1925–2024)

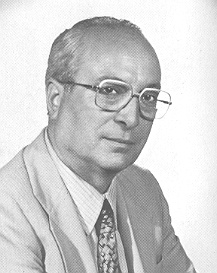

Undersecretary of State for Public Education
- In office 28 November 1974 – 29 July 1976
- Prime Minister: Aldo Moro
- Minister: Franco Maria Malfatti

Member of the Chamber of Deputies
- In office 16 May 1963 – 11 July 1983
- Constituency: Lecce-Brindisi-Taranto

President of the Province of Lecce
- In office 5 October 1985 – 10 August 1990
- Preceded by: Antonio Biasi
- Succeeded by: Rosario Giorgio Costa

Personal details
- Born: 12 June 1925 Nociglia, Province of Lecce, Kingdom of Italy
- Died: 14 December 2024 (aged 99) Nociglia, Apulia, Italy
- Party: DC

Giacinto Urso (12 June 1925 – 14 December 2024) was an Italian politician who served as a deputy for Democrazia Cristiana. Urso died on 14 December 2024, at the age of 99.
