= Gianfranco Gafforelli =

Italian politician (born 1952)

President of the Province of Bergamo
- Incumbent
- Assumed office 15 March 2026
- Preceded by: Pasquale Gandolfi
- In office 1 November 2018 – 16 October 2021
- Preceded by: Matteo Rossi
- Succeeded by: Pasquale Gandolfi

Mayor of Romano di Lombardia
- Incumbent
- Assumed office 24 June 2024
- Preceded by: Sebastian Nicoli

Mayor of Calcinate
- In office 24 May 2011 – 4 October 2021
- Preceded by: Flaminio Tisi
- Succeeded by: Angelo Orlando
- In office 7 June 1990 – 14 June 2004
- Preceded by: Giovanni Scaburri
- Succeeded by: Anacleto Finazzi

Personal details
- Born: 28 July 1952 (age 74) Calcinate, Province of Bergamo, Italy
- Party: Christian Democracy; Forza Italia

Gianfranco Gafforelli (born 28 July 1952) is an Italian politician who has served as president of the Province of Bergamo since 2026. He previously held the office from 2018 to 2021 and also served as mayor of Calcinate and Romano di Lombardia.

== Life and career ==
Gafforelli was born in 1952 in Calcinate, in the province of Bergamo. He obtained a diploma as an accountant from the Vittorio Emanuele II Technical Commercial Institute in Bergamo, graduating in 1977. Until 2017, Gafforelli was employed by the Treviglio Hospital Authority, where he served as administrative manager of the hospitals in Calcinate and Romano di Lombardia.

Gafforelli began his political career in Calcinate with the Christian Democracy, serving as assessor for social services from 1986 to 1990. He was elected mayor in 1990 and served until 2004, and was subsequently mayor again from 2011 to 2021. From 1999 to 2004, Gafforelli served as president of the Council of Mayors' Representation of the Grumello del Monte Social and Health District. In 2003, he was a member of the commission for the Territorial Coordination Plan of the Province of Bergamo. From 2005 to 2011, he was president of the management council of the Serio Regional Park.

Gafforelli served as a member of the Provincial Council of Bergamo from 2014 to 2018. In 2018, he was elected president of the Province of Bergamo with 36,687 weighted votes (50.14%), narrowly defeating Fabio Ferla, the centre-right candidate, who received 36,355 votes. Gafforelli's election was supported by a broad coalition that included the centre-left Democratic Party-aligned Democratici e Civici per la Bergamasca, his own civic list, and the Lega.

In 2024, he was elected mayor of Romano di Lombardia. In 2026, Gafforelli joined Forza Italia and ran as the unified centre-right candidate, also supported by Brothers of Italy and the Lega, and defeated the incumbent Pasquale Gandolfi with 42,445 weighted votes (52%).
