= Lucio Strumendo =

Italian politician (born 1942)

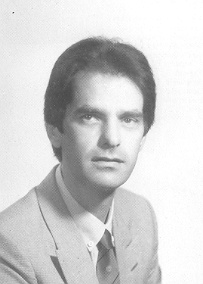

Member of the Chamber of Deputies
- In office 12 July 1983 – 22 April 1992
- Constituency: Venice–Treviso

President of the Province of Venice
- In office 8 August 1975 – 4 August 1980
- Preceded by: Angelo Simion
- Succeeded by: Ruggero Sbrogiò

Personal details
- Born: 26 February 1942 (age 84) Concordia Sagittaria, Province of Venice, Kingdom of Italy
- Party: PCI (until 1991); PDS (1991–1998)
- Occupation: Teacher

Lucio Strumendo (born 26 February 1942) is an Italian politician who served as president of the Province of Venice from 1975 to 1980 and as a member of the Chamber of Deputies from 1983 to 1992.

== Biography ==
A member of the Italian Communist Party, he became a provincial councilor in Venice in 1970 and joined the provincial executive committee of the party’s Venice Federation.

After the 1975 provincial elections, Strumendo was appointed president of the body, with the votes of the PCI,Italian Socialist Party, and PRI. He held this position for one term; he remained in office until August 1980.

In 1980, he was elected to the Veneto Regional Council as a member of the Italian Communist Party (PCI) in the Venice district.

He was subsequently elected to the Chamber of Deputies in 1983 as a member of the Italian Communist Party (PCI) in the Venice-Treviso district, and went on to retain his seat in Montecitorio in the 1987 general election as well. After the “Bolognina” political shift, he joined the Democratic Party of the Left, which he represented in Parliament until 1992.

He ran in the 1994 general election in the single-member district of Portogruaro for the Chamber of Deputies as a candidate for the Alliance of Progressives, but was defeated by the center-right candidate.
