= Filiberto Frescot =

Italian engineer and politician (1827–1911)

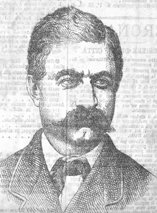

Senator of the Kingdom of Italy
- In office 26 January 1889 – 23 April 1911

Member of the Chamber of Deputies of the Kingdom of Italy
- In office 1871–1882

President of the Province of Turin
- In office 1889–1894
- Preceded by: Office established
- Succeeded by: Filiberto Mazzucchelli

Personal details
- Born: Philibert Frescot; 18 February 1827 Pont-Saint-Martin, Kingdom of Piedmont-Sardinia
- Died: 23 April 1911 (aged 84) Turin, Kingdom of Italy
- Occupation: Engineer

Philibert (Filiberto) Frescot (18 February 1827 – 23 April 1911) was an Italian engineer and politician. He served as a deputy of the Kingdom of Italy for the constituencies of Aosta and Turin II, and was appointed a senator on 26 January 1889. He also served as president of the Province of Turin from 1889 to 1894.
