= Carlo Bottani =

Italian politician

President of the Province of Mantua
- Incumbent
- Assumed office 20 December 2021
- Preceded by: Beniamino Morselli

Mayor of Curtatone
- Incumbent
- Assumed office 1 June 2015
- Preceded by: Antonio Badolato

Personal details
- Born: 14 February 1978 (age 48) Mantua, Lombardy, Italy
- Education: Diploma in accounting

Carlo Bottani (born 14 February 1978) is an Italian politician serving as president of the Province of Mantua from 2021.

== Life and career ==
Bottani was born in Mantua in 1978 and raised in Buscoldo, a frazione of Curtatone. He graduated with a diploma in accounting and worked as a banker before entering politics. He initially served as secretary of the Union of the Centre (UdC) in the province of Mantua.

He was elected mayor of Curtatone in 2015 and was re-elected in 2020. In December 2021, Bottani was elected president of the Province of Mantua supported by a centre-right coalition, succeeding Beniamino Morselli.

In 2026, Bottani was re-elected president with 56% of preferences.
