= Marzio Bernardinetti =

Italian politician and lawyer (1914–2008)

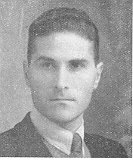

President of the Province of Rieti
- In office 23 March 1961 – 18 February 1963
- Preceded by: Roberto Chiaretti
- Succeeded by: Alfredo Sebastiani

Member of the Chamber of Deputies
- In office 1 June 1948 – 11 June 1958

Member of the Senate of the Republic
- In office 16 May 1963 – 24 May 1972

Personal details
- Born: 2 March 1914 Cenciara, Concerviano, Province of Rome, Kingdom of Italy
- Died: 16 October 2008 (aged 94) Rieti, Lazio, Italy
- Party: Christian Democracy
- Occupation: Lawyer

Marzio Bernardinetti (2 March 1914 – 16 October 2008) was an Italian politician and lawyer. A member of the Christian Democracy, he served as president of the Province of Rieti from 1961 to 1963, as a member of the Chamber of Deputies from 1948 to 1958 and of the Senate of the Republic from 1963 to 1972.
