= Stefano Minerva =

Italian politician (born 1986)

Member of the Regional Council of Apulia
- Incumbent
- Assumed office 23 November 2025

President of the Province of Lecce
- In office 7 November 2018 – 22 October 2025
- Preceded by: Antonio Maria Gabellone
- Succeeded by: Fabio Tarantino

Mayor of Gallipoli
- In office 25 June 2016 – 22 October 2025
- Preceded by: Francesco Errico
- Succeeded by: Flavio Fasano

Personal details
- Born: 4 April 1986 (age 40) Nardò, Apulia, Italy
- Party: Democratic Party

Stefano Minerva (born 4 April 1986) is an Italian politician of the Democratic Party serving as a member of the Regional Council of Apulia since November 2025. He previously served as mayor of Gallipoli from 2016 to 2025 and as president of the Province of Lecce from 2018 to 2025.

== Career ==
He was elected mayor of Gallipoli in the 2016 Italian local elections, defeating independent candidate Flavio Fasano in the runoff with 51.23% of the vote against 48.77%. Minerva was supported by a centre-left coalition including the Democratic Party, the Union of the Centre and several civic lists.

In 2018, Minerva was elected president of the Province of Lecce, defeating Gianni Marra, the centre-right candidate, with 58.56% of the weighted vote. He was re-elected president in 2022, defeating Michele Sperti, the mayor of Miggiano, with 56,517 weighted votes (64%).

In the 2025 Apulian regional election, Minerva was elected to the Regional Council of Apulia in the Lecce constituency on the Democratic Party list, receiving 31,917 preference votes.
