= Annibale Marinelli De Marco =

Italian politician (1872–1947)

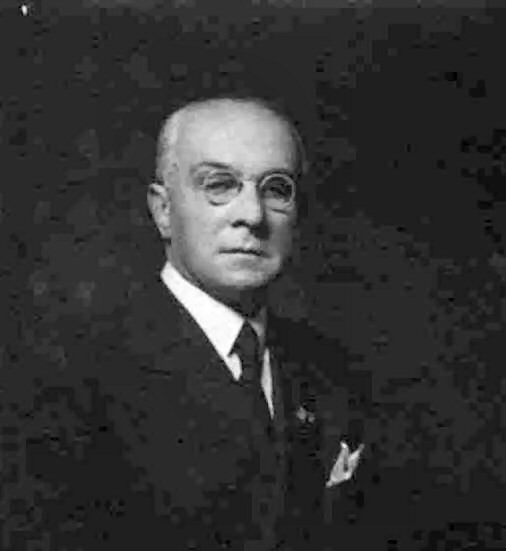

Senator of the Kingdom of Italy
- In office 20 December 1939 – 31 December 1947

President of the Province of Rieti
- In office 1927 – 15 July 1937
- Preceded by: Office established
- Succeeded by: Francesco Palmegiani

Personal details
- Born: 20 July 1872 Rieti, Province of Rome, Kingdom of Italy
- Died: 31 December 1947 (aged 75) Rome, Italy
- Party: National Fascist Party
- Occupation: Entrepreneur

Annibale Marinelli De Marco (20 July 1872 – 31 December 1947) was an Italian entrepreneur and politician. A member of the National Fascist Party, he was the first president of the Province of Rieti, serving from its establishment in 1927 until 15 July 1937. In 1939, he was appointed to the Senate of the Kingdom of Italy.

== Biography ==
He was the first president of the Province of Rieti, from its establishment in 1927 until 1937, and a senator for life beginning in 1939.

He was brought before the High Court of Justice on August 7, 1944, for sanctions against fascism, and in October of that same year, his appointment as senator was revoked; this decision was upheld in 1948, the year following his death.
