= Massimo Ferrarese =

Italian politician, sports executive and entrepreneur

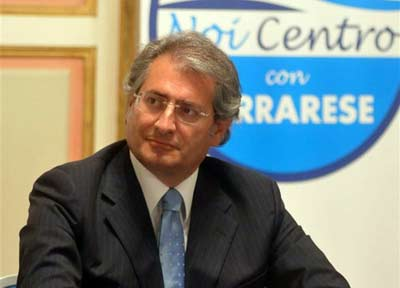

President of the Province of Brindisi
- In office 23 June 2009 – 23 October 2012
- Preceded by: Michele Errico
- Succeeded by: Maurizio Bruno

Personal details
- Born: 28 January 1962 (age 64) Francavilla Fontana, Province of Brindisi, Italy
- Education: University of Bari

Massimo Ferrarese (born 28 January 1962) is an Italian politician, sports executive and entrepreneur. He served as president of the Province of Brindisi from 2009 to 2012.

== Life and career ==
Born in Francavilla Fontana, Ferrarese graduated from the Istituto Tecnico Commerciale Calò in 1981 and studied economics and commerce at the University of Bari Aldo Moro. He is an entrepreneur in the construction, industrial prefabrication and tourism sectors. From 2004 to 2009, he was president of Confindustria Brindisi and served on its national executive committee from 2007 to 2009.

In 2004, Ferrarese acquired a basketball club in Serie B2 and established New Basket Brindisi. As owner and patron, he oversaw its promotion to the top division, winning three championships and a Legadue Italian Cup. He remained honorary president until 2015.

In the 2009 Italian local elections, Ferrarese was elected president of the Province of Brindisi as the candidate of the centre-left coalition, defeating centre-right candidate Michele Saccomanno in the runoff with 57% of the vote.

In 2010, he founded the political movement "Noi Centro". He was elected vice president of the Union of Italian Provinces in 2012 and resigned as provincial president in October of that year.

From 2015 to 2019, Ferrarese was president of Invimit. In 2023, he was appointed extraordinary commissioner for the 2026 Mediterranean Games in Taranto and later became president of their organizing committee.
