= Giuseppe Cerutti (born 1853) =

Italian journalist and politician (1853–1911)

Member of the Chamber of Deputies
- In office 1895–1897

President of the Province of Venice
- In office 1907–1911
- Preceded by: Emilio Penzo
- Succeeded by: Pietro Berna

Personal details
- Born: 20 April 1853 Venice, Lombardy-Venetia
- Died: 19 October 1911 (aged 58) Venice, Kingdom of Italy
- Occupation: Journalist

Giuseppe Cerutti (20 April 1853 – 19 October 1911) was an Italian journalist and politician who served as a member of the Chamber of Deputies from 1895 to 1897. A member of the clerical-moderate party, he was also president of the Province of Venice from 1907 until his death in 1911.

Cerutti was an editor and later the director and owner of the newspaper La Venezia.
