= List of presidents of the Province of Mantua =

President of the Province of Mantua
- Presidente della Provincia di Mantova
- Incumbent; Carlo Bottani since 20 December 2021
- Term length: 4 years
- Inaugural holder: Luigi Sartoretti
- Formation: 1889

The president of the Province of Mantua is the head of the provincial government in Mantua, Lombardy, Italy. The president oversees the administration of the province, coordinates the activities of the municipalities, and represents the province in regional and national matters.

Since December 2021, the office has been held by Carlo Bottani, a centre-right independent.

== List ==
=== Presidents of the Provincial Deputation (1889–1927) ===
No.	Portrait	Name	Term start	Term end	Party
1		Luigi Sartoretti	1889	1890	
2		Giuseppe Debelli	1890	1892	
3		Cesare Gioppi	1892	1895	
4		Gino Dolcini	1895	1902	
5		Italo Gasparetti	1902	1904	
6		Carlo Vezzani	1904	1905	
7		Emanuele Giannantoni	1905	1909	
8		Cesare Finzi	1909	1913	
(7)		Emanuele Giannantoni	1913	1914	
9		Achille Menotti Luppi	1914	?	

=== Presidents of the Province (1951–present) ===
No.	Portrait	Name	Term start	Term end	Party
		?	?	?	?
		Teodosio Aimoni	1959	1964	Italian Communist Party
		?	?	?	?
		Maurizio Lotti	1975	1980	Italian Communist Party
		Maurizio Lotti	1980	1983	Italian Communist Party
		Guido Contessa	1983	1985	Italian Communist Party
		Massimo Chiaventi	24 September 1985	21 July 1990	Italian Communist Party (1985–1991); Democratic Party of the Left (1991–1992)
		Massimo Chiaventi	21 July 1990	2 March 1992	Italian Communist Party (1985–1991); Democratic Party of the Left (1991–1992)
		Davide Boni	21 June 1993	13 June 1997	Lega Nord
		Tiziana Gualtieri	13 June 1997	28 May 2001	Italian People's Party
		Maurizio Fontanili	28 May 2001	30 May 2006	Italian People's Party (2001–2002); The Daisy (2002–2007); Democratic Party (2007–2011)
		Maurizio Fontanili	30 May 2006	1 June 2011	Italian People's Party (2001–2002); The Daisy (2002–2007); Democratic Party (2007–2011)
		Alessandro Pastacci	1 June 2011	1 September 2016	Independent (centre-left)
		Beniamino Morselli	1 September 2016	20 December 2021	Independent (centre-left)
		Carlo Bottani	20 December 2021	10 January 2026	Independent (centre-right)
		Carlo Bottani	10 January 2026	Incumbent	Independent (centre-right)

== Sources ==
- "Storia amministrativa dell'ente". Ministero dell'Interno.
- Menichini, Piera (2005). "I presidenti delle Province dall'Unità alla Grande guerra: repertorio analitico". Storia Amministrazione Costituzione (13): 261–262.
