= List of presidents of the Province of Turin =

President of the Province of Turin
- Presidente della Provincia di Torino
- Inaugural holder: Filiberto Frescot
- Formation: 1889
- Final holder: Antonino Saitta
- Abolished: 2014
- Superseded by: Metropolitan mayor of Turin

The president of the Province of Turin was the head of the provincial administration of Turin, a local government authority in Piedmont, Italy.

== History ==
The office of president of the Province of Turin was established in 1889, initially within the Provincial Deputation. Before that date, the Deputation was headed by the prefect. During the Fascist period (1927–1945), the province was governed by appointed officials, including Royal Commissioners and presidents of reorganised provincial structures under central control.

After World War II, the office was restored and gradually redefined within the Italian Republic, first with indirect election by the Provincial Council and, from 1995, with direct popular election.

The province was eventually replaced in 2015 by the Metropolitan City of Turin.

== List ==
=== Presidents of the Provincial Deputation (1889–1927) ===
No.	Portrait	Name	Term of office		Party
No.	Portrait	Name	Start	End	Party
1		Filiberto Frescot	1889	1895	
2		Filiberto Mazzucchelli	1895	1896	
3		Sergio Davico	1896	1897	
4		Enrico Daneo	1897	1898	
5		Luigi Giordano	1898	1913	
6		Enrico Borgesa	1913	?	
		Giorgio Anselmi	22 November 1920	2 January 1927	

=== Presidents of the Provincial Rectorate (1927–1945) ===
No.	Portrait	Name	Term of office		Party
No.	Portrait	Name	Start	End	Party
1		Giorgio Anselmi	2 January 1927	8 March 1934	National Fascist Party
2		Orazio Quaglia	September 1934	22 July 1938	National Fascist Party
3		Vittorio Vezzani	22 July 1938	16 August 1943	National Fascist Party
–		Gaspare Marconcini (Prefectural commissioner)	16 August 1943	11 March 1944	
–		Giuseppe Avogadro di Casalvolone (Prefectural commissioner)	11 March 1944	16 April 1945	

=== Presidents of the Provincial Deputation (1945–1951) ===
No.	Portrait	Name	Term of office		Party
No.	Portrait	Name	Start	End	Party
1		Giovanni Bovetti	27 April 1945	13 February 1948	Christian Democracy
–		Guido Secreto (Acting president)	13 February 1948	15 June 1948	Christian Democracy
2		Pietro Gambolò	15 June 1948	10 June 1951	Christian Democracy

=== Presidents of the Province (1951–2014) ===
No.	Portrait	Name	Term of office		Party
No.	Portrait	Name	Start	End	Party
1		Giuseppe Grosso	8 October 1951	1965	Christian Democracy
2		Gianni Oberto Tarena	February 1965	1970	Christian Democracy
3		Elio Borgogno	1970	1975	Christian Democracy
4		Giorgio Salvetti	1975	1980	Italian Socialist Party
5		Eugenio Maccari	1980	1985	Italian Socialist Party
6		Nicoletta Vacca Orrù	9 July 1985	25 July 1990	Italian Liberal Party
7		Luigi Sergio Ricca	25 July 1990	8 May 1995	Italian Socialist Party
8		Mercedes Bresso	8 May 1995	28 June 1999	Democrats of the Left
8		Mercedes Bresso	28 June 1999	19 June 2004	Democrats of the Left
9		Antonino Saitta	19 June 2004	23 June 2009	The Daisy; Democratic Party
9		Antonino Saitta	23 June 2009	19 June 2014	The Daisy; Democratic Party
–		Alberto Avetta (Acting president)	19 June 2014	13 October 2014	Democratic Party

== See also ==
- Mayor of Turin
- Metropolitan City of Turin

== Sources ==
- "Storia amministrativa dell'ente". Ministero dell'Interno.
- Cerchio, Giuseppe (2024). La Provincia di Torino: La sua trasformazione, i suoi Presidenti. E poi? La Città Metropolitana!? (PDF). Turin: Edizioni SGI.
- Menichini, Piera (2005). "I presidenti delle Province dall'Unità alla Grande guerra: repertorio analitico". Storia Amministrazione Costituzione (13): 293–294.
