= Taviano =

- Comune
- Comune di Taviano
- Location within Italy Location within Apulia
- Coordinates: 39°59′N 18°5′E
- Country: Italy
- Region: Apulia
- Province: Lecce (LE)
- Frazioni: Marina di Mancaversa

Government
  - Mayor: Giuseppe Tanisi

Area
  - Total: 21 km^{2} (8.1 sq mi)
- Elevation: 54 m (177 ft)

Population (30 November 2018)
  - Total: 11,920
  - Density: 570/km^{2} (1,500/sq mi)
- Demonym: Tavianesi
- Time zone: UTC+1 (CET)
  - Summer (DST): UTC+2 (CEST)
- Postal code: 73057
- Dialing code: 0833
- ISTAT code: 075085
- Patron saint: San Martino di Tours; Madonna del Miracolo
- Saint day: 11 November
- Website: Official website

Taviano (Salentino: Tajanu) is a town and comune in the Italian province of Lecce in the Apulia region of south-east Italy.
