= List of presidents of the Province of Bergamo =

President of the Province of Bergamo
- Presidente della Provincia di Bergamo
- Incumbent; Gianfranco Gafforelli since 15 March 2026
- Term length: 4 years
- Inaugural holder: Giuseppe Piccinelli
- Formation: 1889

The president of the Province of Bergamo is the head of the provincial government in Bergamo, Lombardy, Italy. The president oversees the administration of the province, coordinates the activities of the municipalities, and represents the province in regional and national matters.

Since March 2026, the office has been held by Gianfranco Gafforelli of Forza Italia.

== List ==
=== Presidents of the Provincial Deputation (1889–1927) ===
No.	Portrait	Name	Term		Party
No.	Portrait	Name	Start	End	Party
1		Giuseppe Piccinelli	1889	1893	
2		Paolo Bonomi	1894	1906	
3		Luigi Salvi	1906	1911	
4		Alessandro Colleoni	1911	1914	
5		Luigi Milesi	1914	?	

=== Presidents of the Provincial Deputation (1945–1951) ===
No.	Portrait	Name	Term		Party
No.	Portrait	Name	Start	End	Party
1		Giovanni Motta	1945	1951	Italian Communist Party

=== Presidents of the Province (1951–present) ===
No.	Portrait	Name	Term		Party
No.	Portrait	Name	Start	End	Party
1		Mario Buttaro	1951	1956	Independent
2		Fiorenzo Clauser	1956	1960	Christian Democracy
3		Enzo Zambetti	1961	1964	Christian Democracy
4		Giovanni Giavazzi	1965	1970	Christian Democracy
5		Severino Citaristi	1970	1976	Christian Democracy
6		Franco Fumagalli	1976	1980	Christian Democracy
7		Giancarlo Borra	1980	1985	Christian Democracy
8		Gian Pietro Galizzi	1985	1990	Christian Democracy
9		Giovanni Gaiti	1990	1992	Christian Democracy
10		Gianfranco Ceruti	1992	8 May 1995	Christian Democracy
11		Giovanni Cappelluzzo	8 May 1995	28 June 1999	Lega Nord
12		Valerio Bettoni	28 June 1999	28 June 2004	Forza Italia
12		Valerio Bettoni	28 June 2004	8 June 2009	Forza Italia
13		Ettore Pirovano	8 June 2009	29 September 2014	Lega Nord
14		Matteo Rossi	29 September 2014	1 November 2018	Democratic Party
15		Gianfranco Gafforelli	1 November 2018	16 October 2021	Independent (centre-right)
–		Pasquale Gandolfi	16 October 2021	19 December 2021	Democratic Party
16		Pasquale Gandolfi	19 December 2021	15 March 2026	Democratic Party
(15)		Gianfranco Gafforelli	15 March 2026	Incumbent	Forza Italia

== Sources ==
- "Storia amministrativa dell'ente". Ministero dell'Interno.
- "Presidenti della Provincia" (in Italian). Provincia di Bergamo.
- Menichini, Piera (2005). "I presidenti delle Province dall'Unità alla Grande guerra: repertorio analitico". Storia Amministrazione Costituzione (13): 232–233.
