= List of presidents of the Province of Venice =

President of the Province of Venice
- Presidente della Provincia di Venezia
- Inaugural holder: Antonio Ciereghin
- Formation: 1889
- Final holder: Francesca Zaccariotto
- Abolished: 2015
- Superseded by: Metropolitan mayor of Venice

The president of the Province of Venice was the head of the provincial administration of Venice, a local government authority in Veneto, Italy.

== History ==
The office of president of the Province of Venice was established in 1889, initially within the Provincial Deputation. Before that date, the Deputation was headed by the prefect. During the Fascist period (1926–1945), the province was governed by appointed officials, including Royal Commissioners and presidents of reorganised provincial structures under central control.

After World War II, the office was restored and gradually redefined within the Italian Republic, first with indirect election by the Provincial Council and, from 1995, with direct popular election.

The province was eventually replaced in 2015 by the Metropolitan City of Venice.

== List ==
=== Presidents of the Provincial Deputation (1889–1928) ===
No.	Portrait	Name	Term of office		Party
No.	Portrait	Name	Start	End	Party
1		Antonio Ciereghin	1889	1901	?
2		Luigi Cesare Bortolotto	1901	1903	?
3		Emilio Penzo	1903	1907	?
4		Giuseppe Cerutti	1907	1911	?
5		Pietro Berna	1911	1914	?
6		Giovanni Chiggiato	1914	1920	?
		Francesco Saccardo	1921	1925	Italian People's Party

=== Presidents of the Provincial Rectorate (1929–1945) ===
No.	Portrait	Name	Term of office		Party
No.	Portrait	Name	Start	End	Party
–		Antonio Garioni	1926	1929	National Fascist Party
1		Antonio Garioni	1929	1933	National Fascist Party
1		Antonio Garioni	1933	October 1937	National Fascist Party
2		Vilfrido Casellati	October 1937	1943	National Fascist Party

=== Presidents of the Provincial Deputation (1945–1951) ===
No.	Portrait	Name	Term of office		Party
No.	Portrait	Name	Start	End	Party
1		Angiolo Tursi	1945	6 February 1949	Italian Liberal Party
		Giovanni Favaretto Fisca	1949	1951	Christian Democracy

=== Presidents of the Province (1951–2015) ===
No.	Portrait	Name	Term of office		Party
No.	Portrait	Name	Start	End	Party
1		Giovanni Favaretto Fisca	1951	1956	Christian Democracy
1		Giovanni Favaretto Fisca	1956	1960	Christian Democracy
2		Alberto Bagagiolo	1960	1964	Christian Democracy
2		Alberto Bagagiolo	1964	1970	Christian Democracy
3		Angelo Simion	1970	1975	Italian Socialist Party
4		Lucio Strumendo	1975	1980	Italian Communist Party
5		Ruggero Sbrogiò	1980	1981	Italian Communist Party
6		Giannantonio Paladini	1981	1982	Italian Socialist Party
(5)		Ruggero Sbrogiò	1982	1985	Italian Communist Party
7		Orlando Minchio	1985	29 January 1988	Christian Democracy
8		Stefano Nicolò Petris	29 January 1988	14 August 1990	Italian Socialist Party
9		Oliviero Pillon	14 August 1990	22 April 1993	Italian Socialist Party
10		Anna Luisa Furlan	8 June 1993	8 May 1995	Democratic Party of the Left
11		Luigino Busatto	8 May 1995	28 June 1999	Italian People's Party; The Daisy
11		Luigino Busatto	28 June 1999	14 June 2004	Italian People's Party; The Daisy
12		Davide Zoggia	14 June 2004	23 June 2009	Democrats of the Left; Democratic Party
13		Francesca Zaccariotto	23 June 2009	12 January 2015	Lega Nord
–		Cesare Castelli (Extraordinary Commissioner)	12 January 2015	31 August 2015	—

== See also ==
- Mayor of Venice
- Metropolitan City of Venice

== Sources ==
- "Storia amministrativa dell'ente". Ministero dell'Interno.
- Agostini, Filiberto (2012). Il governo locale nel Veneto all'indomani della liberazione. Milan: FrancoAngeli.
- Menichini, Piera (2005). "I presidenti delle Province dall'Unità alla Grande guerra: repertorio analitico". Storia Amministrazione Costituzione (13): 297–298.
