= List of presidents of the Province of Rieti =

President of the Province of Rieti
- Presidente della Provincia di Rieti

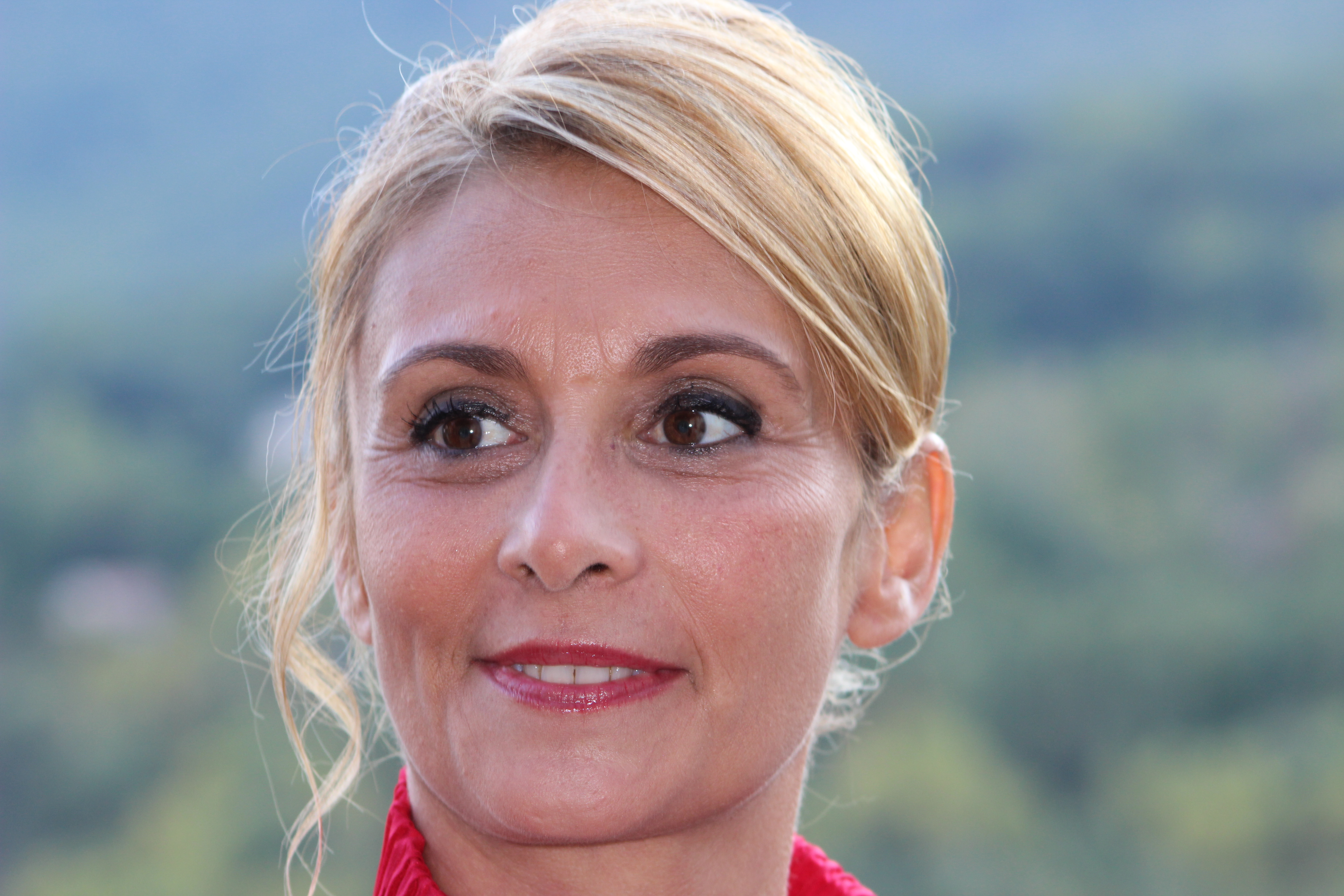
- Incumbent; Roberta Cuneo since 29 January 2023
- Term length: 4 years
- Inaugural holder: Annibale Marinelli De Marco
- Formation: 1927

The president of the Province of Rieti is the head of the provincial government in Rieti, Lazio, Italy. The president oversees the administration of the province, coordinates the activities of the municipalities, and represents the province in regional and national matters.

Since January 2023, the office has been held by Roberta Cuneo of the Lega party.

== History ==
The Province of Rieti was established in 1927 by the Fascist government. Local autonomy had been abolished and provincial administrations were placed under central control, with appointed officials replacing elected presidents.

After the establishment of the Italian Republic, the office was restored and the president was again elected by the Provincial Council starting from 1952. In 1995, a reform introduced the direct election of the president by popular vote. The Province of Rieti was eventually reformed in 2014 under national legislation on provinces, with its functions reduced in favour of the Lazio region and local municipalities.

== List ==
=== Presidents of the Provincial Rectorate (1927–1944) ===
No.	Portrait	Name	Term of office		Party
No.	Portrait	Name	Start	End	Party
1		Annibale Marinelli De Marco	1927	15 July 1937	National Fascist Party
2		Francesco Palmegiani	28 July 1937	9 October 1943	National Fascist Party
–		Gino Colelli (acting)	25 October 1943	31 December 1943	National Fascist Party
3		Cesare Pileri	10 January 1944	25 May 1944	Republican Fascist Party

=== Presidents of the Provincial Deputation (1944–1952) ===
No.	Portrait	Name	Term of office		Party
No.	Portrait	Name	Start	End	Party
–		Alfonso Apicella	25 June 1944	6 September 1944	Prefectural commissioner
1		Luigi Colarieti	14 September 1944	22 July 1946	
2		Ivo Coccia	24 August 1946	21 February 1948	Christian Democracy
3		Giovanni Fiori	6 March 1948	22 May 1952	

=== Presidents of the Province (1952–present) ===
No.	Portrait	Name	Term of office		Party
No.	Portrait	Name	Start	End	Party
1		Luigi Colarieti	5 July 1952	8 February 1954	
2		Fernando Ricca	8 May 1954	8 October 1955	
3		Ivo Coccia	8 October 1955	31 March 1958	Christian Democracy
4		Alberto Mario Cirese	5 May 1958	19 May 1958	Italian Socialist Party
5		Roberto Chiaretti	14 June 1958	20 September 1960	
6		Marzio Bernardinetti	23 March 1961	18 February 1963	Christian Democracy
7		Alfredo Sebastiani	3 June 1963	14 April 1970	
8		Leonardo Leonardi	24 October 1970	11 October 1973	
9		Manlio Ianni	6 November 1973	30 April 1975	Christian Democracy
10		Bruno Vella	20 October 1975	8 March 1982	Italian Socialist Party
11		Giovanni Antonini	15 March 1982	18 June 1985	Christian Democracy
12		Pio Gatti	31 July 1985	12 June 1986	Christian Democracy
13		Mario Marchionni	12 June 1986	31 July 1990	Christian Democracy
14		Cesare Giuliani	31 July 1990	8 May 1995	Christian Democracy
15		Giosuè Calabrese	8 May 1995	8 November 1995	Italian People's Party
–		Mario Zirilli	8 November 1995	29 December 1995	Prefectural commissioner
(15)		Giosuè Calabrese	29 December 1995	28 June 1999	Italian People's Party; The Daisy
(15)		Giosuè Calabrese	28 June 1999	28 June 2004	Italian People's Party; The Daisy
16		Fabio Melilli	28 June 2004	23 June 2009	The Daisy; Democratic Party
16		Fabio Melilli	23 June 2009	12 February 2013	The Daisy; Democratic Party
–		Giancarlo Felici	12 February 2013	13 October 2014	Extraordinary commissioner
17		Giuseppe Rinaldi	13 October 2014	1 November 2018	Democratic Party
18		Mariano Calisse	1 November 2018	29 January 2023	Lega
19		Roberta Cuneo	29 January 2023	Incumbent	Lega

== Sources ==
- Redazione (20 March 2021). "Presidenti Provincia di Rieti dal 1927". Tutto Rieti.
- "Storia amministrativa dell'ente". Ministero dell'Interno.
