= Antonino Saitta =

Italian politician (born 1950)

Regional assessor for Health of Piedmont
- In office 16 June 2014 – 26 May 2019
- President: Sergio Chiamparino

Member of the Regional Council of Piedmont
- In office 12 June 1995 – 17 February 2005

President of the Province of Turin
- In office 19 June 2004 – 19 June 2014
- Preceded by: Mercedes Bresso
- Succeeded by: Office abolished

Mayor of Rivoli
- In office 1 February 1988 – 24 April 1995

Personal details
- Born: 15 July 1950 (age 76) Raddusa, Sicily, Italy
- Party: Christian Democracy; Italian People's Party; The Daisy; Democratic Party
- Education: University of Turin
- Profession: Public officer

Antonino Saitta (born 15 July 1950) is an Italian politician who served as mayor of Rivoli from 1988 to 1995, as a member of the Regional Council of Piedmont from 1995 to 2005, and as the last president of the Province of Turin from 2004 to 2014. He subsequently served as regional assessor for health in Piedmont from 2014 to 2019.
