= Fiamignano =

- Comune
- Comune di Fiamignano
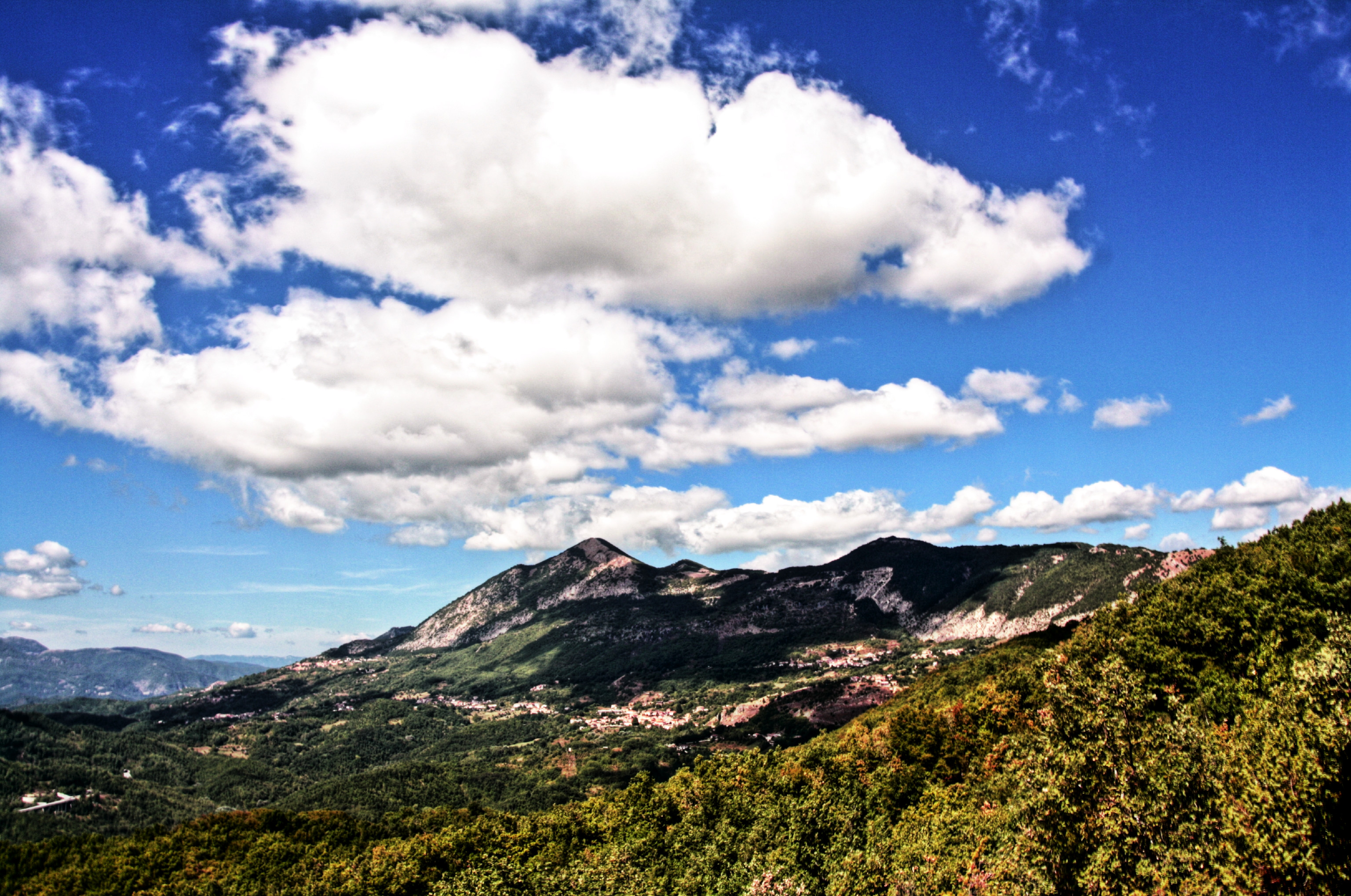
- View of Fiamignano

- Coat of arms

- Location within Italy Location within Lazio
- Coordinates: 42°16′N 13°8′E
- Country: Italy
- Region: Lazio
- Province: Rieti (RI)
- Frazioni: Arapetrianni, Aringo, Bruciano, Carriafuni, Case del Forno, Case Federico, Case Tocci, Cercucce, Collaralli, Collegiudeo (Radicaro), Collemazzolino, Colle Sambuco, Corso, Fagge, Fontefredda (unhinabited), Gamagna, Marmosedio, Mercato, Perdesco, Peschieta, Piedi la Piagge, San Pietro, San Salvatore, Sant'Agapito, Santa Lucia, Santa Maria, Sant'Ippolito, Santo Stefano, Ville (unhinabited)

Government
  - Mayor: Carmine Rinaldi

Area
  - Total: 100.62 km^{2} (38.85 sq mi)
- Elevation: 988 m (3,241 ft)

Population (31 July 2017)
  - Total: 1,346
  - Density: 13.38/km^{2} (34.65/sq mi)
- Demonym: Fiamignanesi
- Time zone: UTC+1 (CET)
  - Summer (DST): UTC+2 (CEST)
- Postal code: 02023
- Dialing code: 0746
- Website: Official website

Fiamignano is a comune (municipality) in the Province of Rieti in the Italian region of Latium, located about 70 kilometres (43 mi) northeast of Rome and about 25 kilometres (16 mi) southeast of Rieti. Until 1927 it was part of the Province of L'Aquila, in Abruzzi e Molise.
