= Giovanni Pellegrino =

Italian politician (born 1939)

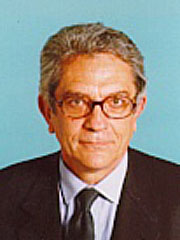
Pellegrino in the 1990s

Giovanni Pellegrino (born 5 January 1939) is an Italian politician. Born in Lecce and a lawyer by profession, he was a Senator of the Republic from 1990 with the Italian Communist Party and the Democrats of the Left to 2001. He also presided from late 1994 to 1996 and from 27 September 1996 to 29 May 2001 over the Parliamentary Commission on Terrorism concerning the "Years of Lead", created by a 1988 law to investigate terrorism in Italy till 2001.

At the end of the commission experience, Pellegrino wrote a book with the writer Giovanni Fasanella, describing a long years' "low intensity" civil war in Italy, from 1945 till today. He was also part of the Elections Council and Parliamentary Immunity (Giunta elezioni e immunità parlamentari), as well as a member of the Commission on Institutional Reforms. Pellegrino was the president of the Province of Lecce, in Apulia, from 2004 until 2009. As representative of the Democrats of the Left (DS), he defeated Raffaele Baldassare (House of Freedoms) during the June 2004 elections with 51.8% of the vote, supported by a centre-left coalition. He retired from politics in June 2009.

== See also ==
- Years of lead (Italy) (1969-1989)
- Democrats of the Left

== Bibliography ==
- Fasanella Giovanni, Pellegrino Giovanni, La guerra civile, Editore : BUR Biblioteca Univ. Rizzoli, 2005. ISBN 978-88-17-00630-9 - A book about the more as 60 years long low intensity civil war in Italy.
