= Libero Corso Bovio =

Italian poet and playwright

- Born: May 5, 1948; Milan, Italy
- Died: July 9, 2007 (aged 59); Milan, Italy
- Occupations: lawyer, journalist, professor

Libero Corso Bovio (5 May 1948 – 9 July 2007) was an Italian lawyer, journalist and professor. He was the descendant of a family of Neapolitan lawyers and jurists, and he was also a lecturer in law and a journalist. He is also known for being the nephew of Italian poet and musician Libero Bovio and the great-grandson of the Italian philosopher Giovanni Bovio.

== Life ==
Libero Corso Bovio was born in Milan on 5 May 1948. His father was Giovanni Bovio, one of the leading Milanese lawyers, who died in the 1970s. His grandfather was the poet and musician Libero Bovio (1883–1942), while his great-grandfather was the philosopher Giovanni Bovio (1837–1903). Among his ancestors is also Francesco Maria Bovio (about 1750–1830), a lawyer and professor of literature and law at the University of Altamura who actively participated in the revolutionary movements of Neapolitan Republic of 1799 and the Altamuran Revolution (1799).

Libero Corso Bovio graduated in law in 1971 at the age of 24 with 110/110 cum laude from the University of Milan. He also became a journalist in 1970. Over time, he became a well-known lawyer, and worked in a well-known office specialising in press laws and criminal law. He was also married to lawyer Rita Percile.

=== Death ===
On 9 July 2007, Corso Bovio returned from a business trip to Prato at around 2 pm. He had handed a letter to his assistant, which had to be delivered to his wife and had locked himself in his office, located in Via Podgora, 13, Milan. Shortly thereafter, his assistant heard a shot, and the lawyer was found dead inside his room. From the beginning, detectives considered more likely that a suicide occurred, by blowing in the mouth with a 357 Magnum.

Some relatives, acquaintances and colleagues were incredulous in front of the fact, and they couldn't find any reason why Bovio had committed suicide. In the days following his death, some websites somewhat questioned the suicide, which was described as "obscure".

== Career as lawyer and lecturer ==
Bovio worked as a lawyer for some of the major Italian publishing companies, including RCS MediaGroup, Il Sole 24 Ore and Società San Paolo. He had also worked as a lawyer for the well-known financier Stefano Ricucci. Some of his clients were prominent Italian politicians and businessmen.

He published some works for Ordine Nazionale dei Giornalisti. He also held courses at the IFG of the Ordine dei Giornalisti di Milano and at the school of journalism of the University of Urbino. He also worked for the Bocconi University for criminal procedure seminars. As a journalist, moreover, he collaborated actively with many Italian newspapers, including Corriere della Sera and Italian magazines such as Famiglia Cristiana and Oggi.

== Offices ==
- Consigliere Nazionale dell'Ordine dei Giornalisti
- Membro della Federazione Nazionale della Stampa
- Membro del Consiglio direttivo dell'Associazione Lombarda Giornalisti
- Presidente del Circolo della Stampa (1990–1995)
- Presidente della Fondazione Amici Circolo della Stampa di Milano (2004–2007)

== Works ==
- Ordine Nazionale dei Giornalisti. Libero Corso Bovio (ed.). Diritto e informazione.
- Articles on various Italian law journals, most of which focused on press laws.

== See also ==
- Libero Bovio
- Giovanni Bovio
- Francesco Maria Bovio
