= Jews of San Nicandro =

Community of Jewish proselytes from San Nicandro Garganico, Italy

The Jews of San Nicandro (also called San Nicandro Jews) are a small community of gerim from San Nicandro Garganico, Italy. The San Nicandro Jews are descended from local non-Jewish families from the 15th century. According to John A. Davis, professor of Italian history at the University of Connecticut, the Jews of San Nicandro represent "the only case of collective conversion to Judaism in Europe in modern times".

== History ==
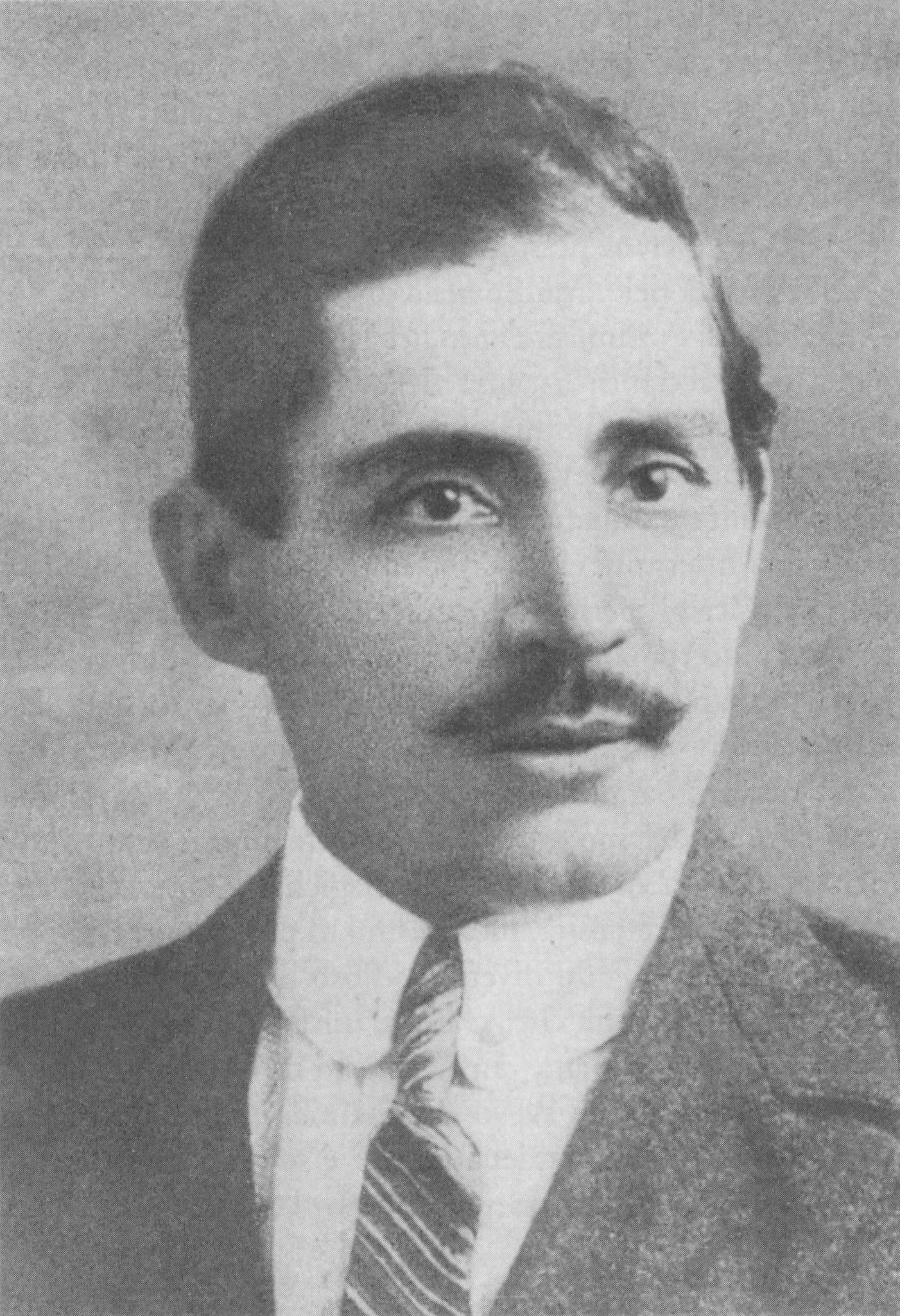
Photograph of Donato Manduzio

Beginning in the late 1920s, the Jewish community of San Nicandro developed as a result of the conversion to Judaism of Donato Manduzio (1885–1948), a crippled World War I veteran who was inspired by his own reading of the Bible. Donato was the son of Giuseppe Manduzio and Concetta Frascaria, poor Roman Catholic peasants from San Nicandro. He did not go to school but he learned reading and writing during World War I, while he was hospitalized in a military hospital in Pisa. After the war, he started to read extensively on religion and Italian literature. He became a folk healer and had encounters with some Protestants (including Pentecostals and Adventists) nearby his hometown. By 1930, he read the Bible and claimed to have had a vision, abandoned Christianity, and started to spread his message among the folk of San Nicandro, exhorting them to live according to the Law of Moses and follow a Jewish lifestyle.

He soon converted several dozen of his neighbors, founding a small Jewish Sabbatarian sect. Later, he contacted the Chief Rabbi of the Jewish community of Rome and organized the formal conversion of his followers to Orthodox Judaism. By 1949, most of the San Nicandro Jews emigrated to Israel, where the majority of them settled in the cities of Birya and Safed. Today the remaining Jews worship in the historic Scolanova Synagogue, in the neighboring town of Trani, Apulia.

The Jewish community of San Nicandro is featured in the documentary The Mystery of San Nicandro, which began filming in Italy in 2011. The film is produced by the Toronto-based studio Matter of Fact Media.

== See also ==
- Abayudaya, a Jewish community in Uganda that similarly converted based on their leader's interpretation of the Bible
- B'nai Moshe, a similar group in Peru

== Bibliography ==
- Cassin, Elena: San Nicandro. Un paese del Gargano si converte all'ebraismo. Corbaccio, Milan (1995), ISBN 978-8879720861.
- Colafemmina, Cesare: Mosè nelle nostre terre. Schena Editore, Fasano (2006).
- Davis, John A.: The Jews of San Nicandro, Yale University Press (October 26, 2010), ISBN 978-0300114256.
- Lapide, Pinchas: The Prophet of San Nicandro. NY: Beechurst Press, 1953.
- Serfaty, Viviane: Donato Manduzio’s Diary, from Church to Synagogue. Cambridge Scholars Publishing, Newcastle upon Tyne (2017), ISBN 978-1-4438-1276-4.
- Bell Broadcast and New Media Fund press release regarding the funding of The Mystery of San Nicandro.
