= Francesco Maria Bovio =

Italian lawyer, judge and professor

- Born: ca. 1750; Altamura, Kingdom of Naples
- Died: 1830; Trani, Kingdom of the Two Sicilies
- Citizenship: Kingdom of Naples; Kingdom of the Two Sicilies
- Occupations: Lawyer; Judge; Lecturer of law Lecturer of literature Lecturer of Latin and Ancient Greek

Francesco Maria Bovio (c. 1750 - 1830) was an Italian lawyer, judge and professor. He is best known for being the grandfather of Italian philosopher Giovanni Bovio (1837-1903). He also fought for the Parthenopean Republic (1799) during the Altamuran Revolution (1799).

== Life ==
Francesco Maria Bovio was born in Altamura in the 1750s to a family of landowners; the exact date of birth is currently unknown. He studied literature and law at the University of Naples, and he turned out to be particularly gifted in the field of law. After winning a public competition for the position of teacher, he taught Latin and Ancient Greek in the "Royal Schools" (Italian: Reali scuole) of Matera, Italy.

After his father's death, when he returned to his hometown Altamura in order to administer his properties, he was assigned the position of lecturer of literature as well as civil and canon law at the University of Altamura.

At the end of the 18th century, he was already a member of the Altamura Masonic lodge Oriente di Altamura, together with other famous Altamurans. The seat of the Masonic lodge was the baronial palace of the Melodia family (different from today's palazzo Melodia, designed by architect Orazio Lerario in the 17th century). He took an active part in the Altamuran Revolution (1799), planting the Tree of Liberty. He was later removed from teaching, but after the Treaty of Florence (1801), he was allowed to resume teaching.

In the period of 1806-1815 (with the French kings Giuseppe Bonaparte and Gioacchino Murat ruling over the Kingdom of Naples), he was appointed judge (giudice interino di pace). When Court of Appeal transferred to Altamura (1808), Francesco Bovio brilliantly worked as a lawyer in that court of appeal, following the court even when it was transferred to Trani. In 1821, he became a judge of the civil court of Lecce, but after a few years, he returned to Trani because of his age, and there he died in 1830.

He had at least two children - Scipione Bovio and Nicola Bovio. Both of them, in 1820, joined the Carboneria of Trani (the so-called sale of "the Pelican"). Nicola Bovio was the father of the famous philosopher Giovanni Bovio (1837-1903).

== The Altamuran Revolution ==
During the upheavals of the Neapolitan Republic of 1799, Bovio became minister of the Republican Departmental Government. Later, with the return of the Bourbons as kings of the Kingdom of Naples, he was not allowed to teach anymore. Bovio claimed to have joined and fought during the Altamuran Revolution (1799) for fear of being shot by the commissioner Nicola Palomba of Avigliano (who, together with general Felice Mastrangelo of Montalbano, were the leaders of the Altamuran Revolution).

== See also ==
- Libero Corso Bovio

== Bibliography ==
- Vincenzo Vicenti (1998). Arcangela Vicenti and Giuseppe Pupillo (ed.). Medaglioni altamurani del 1799. Cassano Murge.
- Ruggero Di Castiglione (13 September 2014). La Massoneria nelle due Sicilie: E i fratelli meridionali del '700 - Le Province. Vol. 4. Gangemi editore. ISBN 9788849274004.
