= Scolagrande Synagogue =

Synagogue in Trani, Italy

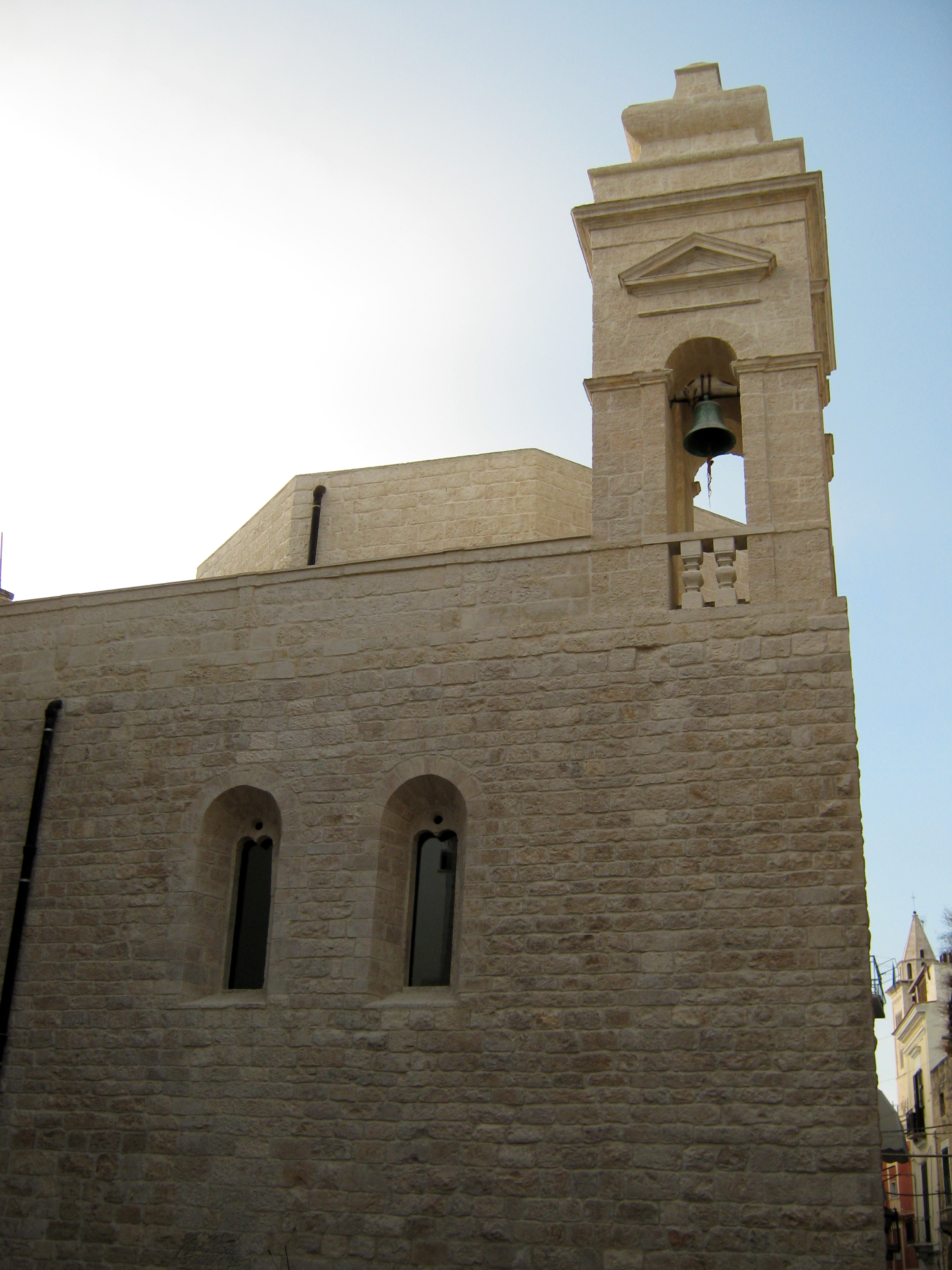
- The synagogue, in 2009

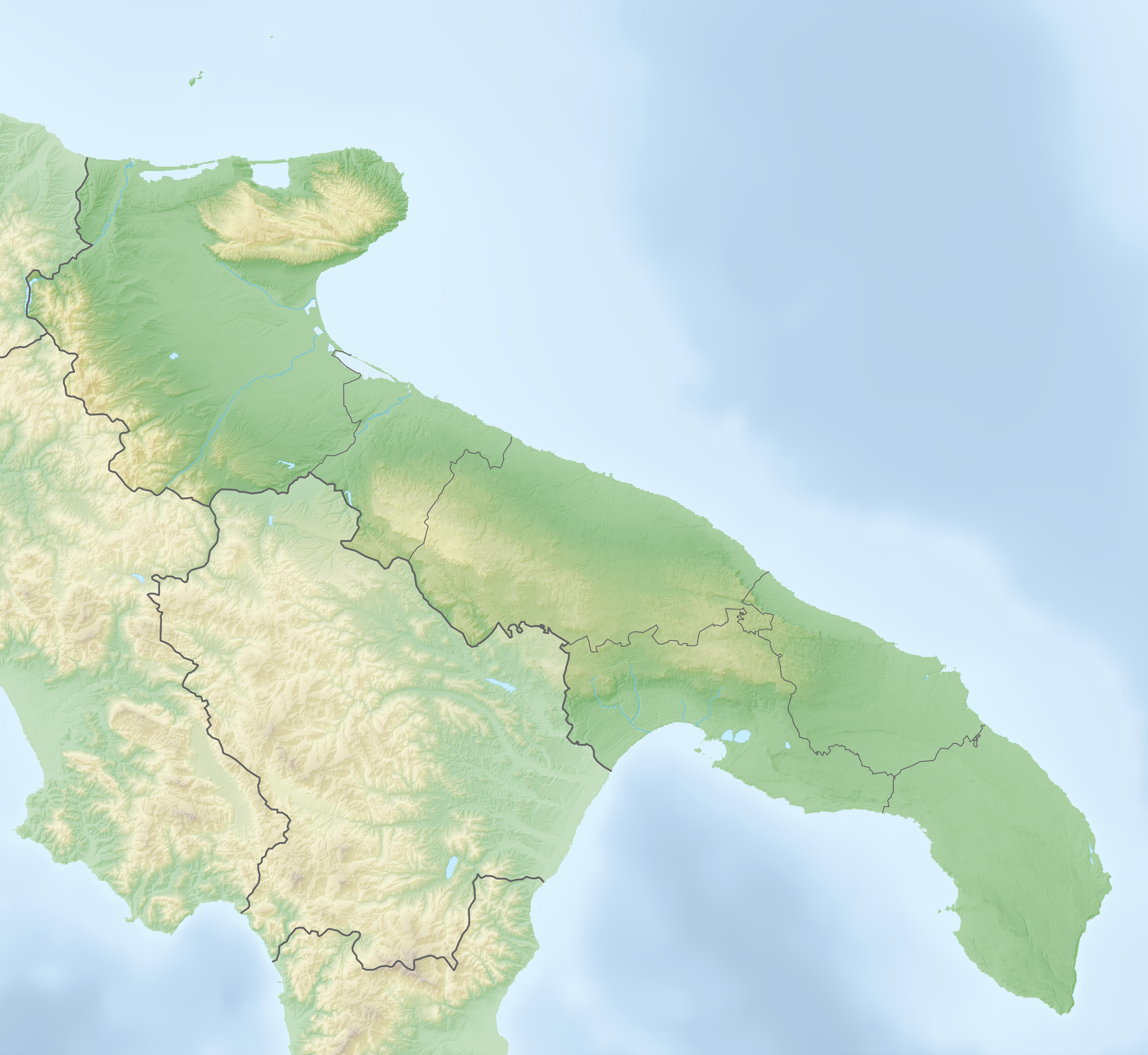
- Location of the synagogue in Apulia

Religion
- Affiliation: Judaism
- Ecclesiastical or organizational status: Synagogue (1247–1380); Church (1380–2004); Synagogue and Jewish museum (since 2005)
- Ownership: Jewish Community of Naples
- Status: Active

Location
- Location: Via la Giudea 24, Trani, Apulia
- Country: Italy
- Interactive map of Scolagrande Synagogue
- Coordinates: 41°16′49″N 16°25′05″E

Architecture
- Type: Synagogue architecture
- Style: Byzantine
- Completed: 1247

Specifications
- Length: 12 m (38 ft)
- Width: 12 m (40 ft)
- Dome: One
- Dome height (outer): 7.9 m (26 ft)
- Materials: Stone

Website
- fondazioneseca.it/home/museosinagoga.html (in Italian)

The Scolagrande Synagogue (Judeo-Italian: Grand Synagogue) is a Jewish congregation and synagogue, located at Via la Giudea 24, in the town of Trani, Apulia, in Italy. Built by the Italian–Jewish community of Apulia during the Middle Ages and completed in 1247, the building was acquired by the Roman Catholic Church in 1380 and served as St. Anne's Church (Italian: Chiesa di Sant’Anna) until it was deconsecrated and returned to the Jewish community in 2004.

The building is used as a synagogue and as a Jewish museum, called the St. Anna Synagogue Museum (Italian: Museo Sinagoga Sant'Anna), as part of the Diocesan Museum of Trani.

== History ==
The building was one of four synagogues in Trani converted to churches in 1380, when the 310 Jews remaining in the city were forcibly converted to Christianity. The four confiscated synagogues were renamed Santa Maria in Scolanova (now the Scolanova Synagogue), San Leonardo Abate, and San Pietro Martire. San Pietro was later demolished. San Leonardo has undergone such extensive renovation that little of the synagogue building survives.

Originally known as the Scolagrande Synagogue, the building was renamed for Quiricus and Julietta (Santi Quirico e Giovita) after it was confiscated for use as a church, and later renamed as Sant'Anna.

A medieval plaque on the northern wall describes an early renovation of the synagogue: "In the year 5007 after the creation, this sanctuary was built by a group of friends of the congregation, with a high decorated dome, a window providing light and new doors for the closure; the floor relaid and seats installed for the choir. May their piety be remembered before Him Who dwells in the splendid heavens." The date translates to 1247 CE.

In 2004, the Roman Catholic Church deconsecrated the church and returned the former synagogue building to the Jewish community, with ownership transferred to the Jewish Community of Naples. The building has operated as a synagogue and as a Jewish museum since 2005.

== Architecture ==
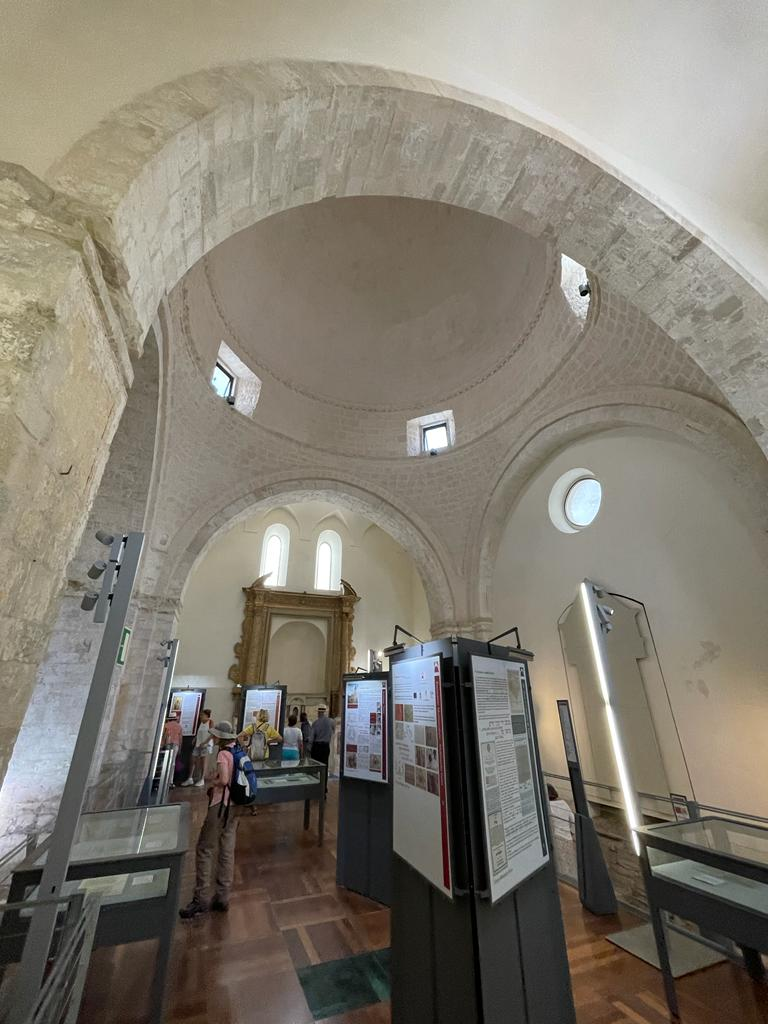
Interior of the Synagogue Museum

The Scolagrande Synagogue was an almost square, Byzantine-style domed, masonry building, 12 by 12 m (38 by 40 ft), formed by four huge arched walls supporting a 7.9 m (26 ft) high dome. The arch of the western wall opens into a semi-circular niche supporting an arched dome thought to have once contained the bimah. This would have been an early version of the plan later widely adopted by Sephardic synagogues in which the bimah is on the western wall and the Ark on the eastern wall separated by the length of the room.

The building was renovated in 1841, in 1880 and in 1978, as a church. It features paintings of scenes from the Old Testament.

== See also ==
- History of the Jews in Italy
- List of synagogues in Italy
