= Scolanova Synagogue =

Synagogue in Trani, Italy

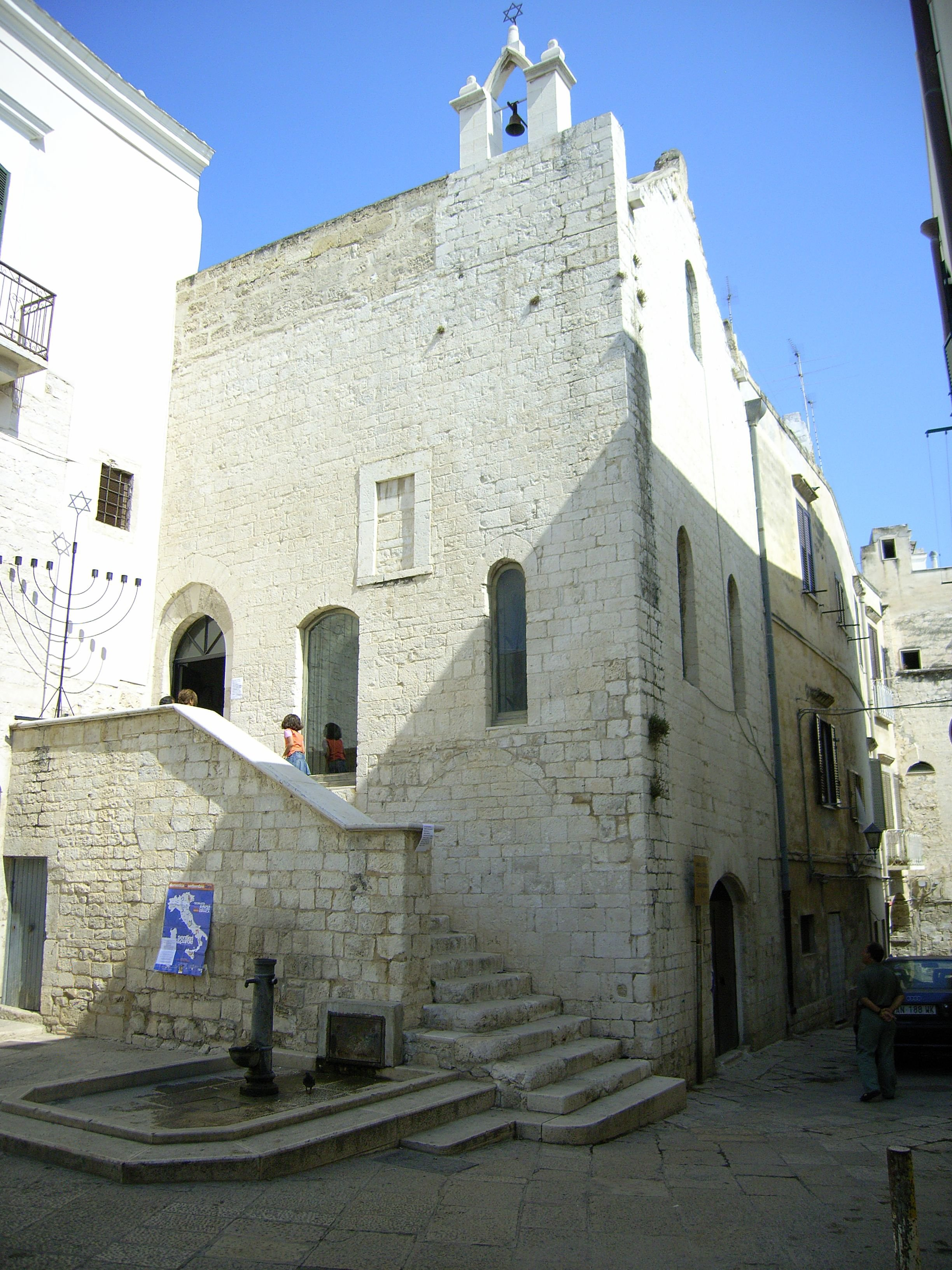
- The synagogue, in 2007

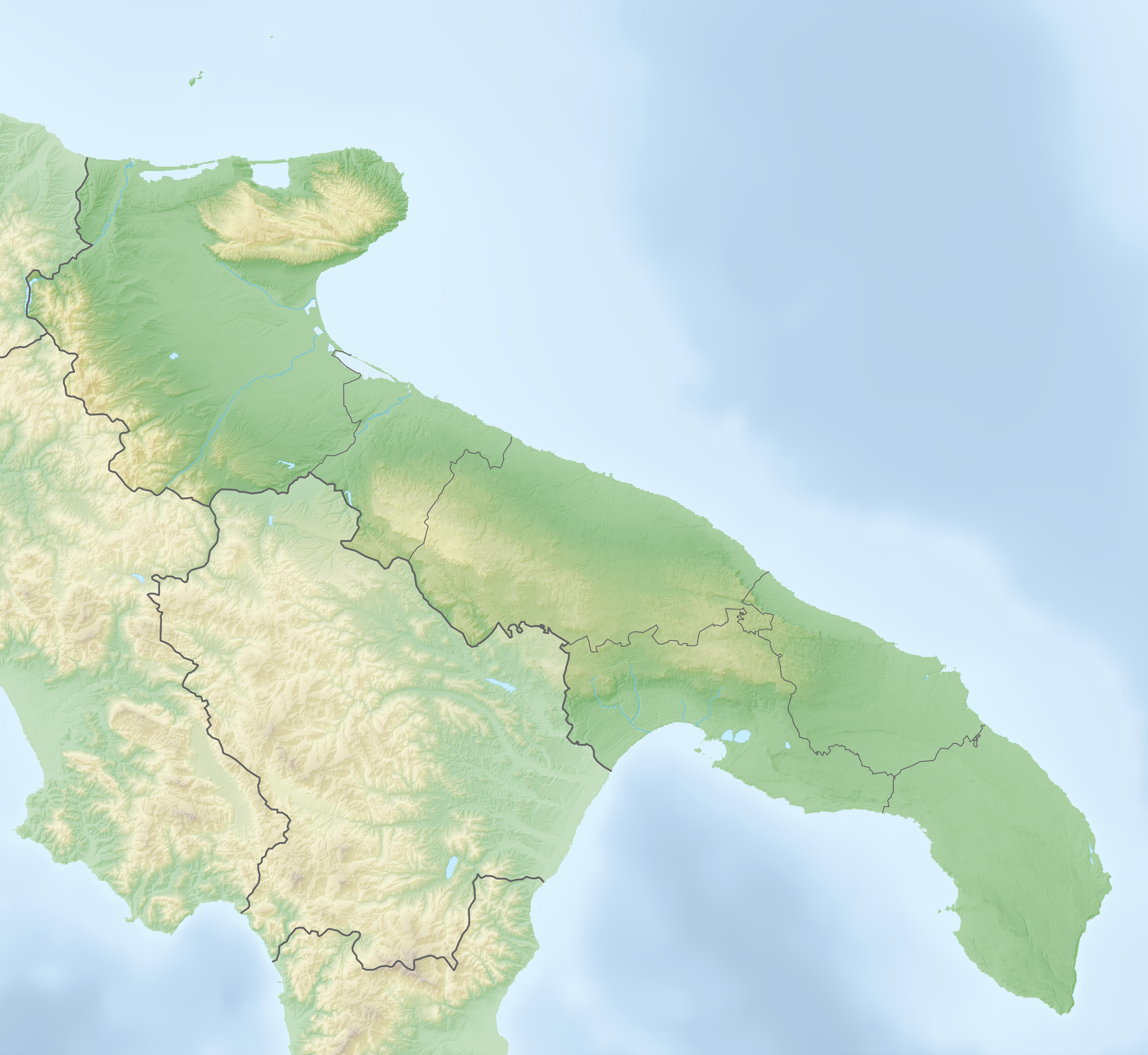
- Location of the synagogue in Apulia

Religion
- Affiliation: Judaism
- Ecclesiastical or organizational status: Synagogue (1240–1380); Church (1380–1950s); Synagogue (since 2006)
- Ownership: Jewish Community of Naples
- Status: Active

Location
- Location: Via Sinagoga 47, Trani, Apulia
- Country: Italy
- Interactive map of Scolanova Synagogue
- Coordinates: 41°16′47″N 16°25′04″E

Architecture
- Type: Synagogue architecture
- Style: Gothic
- Completed: 1240

Specifications
- Length: 15 m (49 ft)
- Width: 6.4 m (21 ft)
- Height (max): 11 m (36 ft) (interior)
- Materials: Stone

The Scolanova Synagogue (English: New Synagogue) is a Jewish congregation and synagogue, located at Via Sinagoga 47, in the town of Trani, Apulia, in southern Italy. Built by the Italian–Jewish community of Apulia during the Middle Ages, the building was acquired by the Roman Catholic Church in 1380 during a wave of antisemitism and served as St. Maria's Church (Italian: Santa Maria in Scolanova) until it was deconsecrated and returned to the Jewish community in 2006.

The building has been restored for use as a synagogue.

== History ==
By 1541 all of the four synagogues in Trani had been converted to churches and the 310 Jews remaining in the city forcibly converted to Christianity. The four confiscated synagogues were renamed Santa Maria in Scolanova, San Leonardo Abate, San Pietro Martire, and Santi Quirico e Giovita (renamed as St. Anne's Church (Italian: Chiesa di Sant’Anna)), which was once the Scolagrande Synagogue and restored as a synagogue from 2004. San Pietro was later demolished. A plaque is visible on the northern wall of the Scolagrande Synagogue that explains that the building was built on the site of a demolished synagogue in 1247. San Leonardo has undergone such extensive renovation that little of the synagogue building survives.

In 2006 the Scolanova Synagogue, which had been standing as an empty and disused church since the 1950s, was de-consecrated and returned to the Jewish community. The individuals principally responsible for the reconsecration of the synagogue were Professor Francesco Lotoro, and his wife Grazia, descendants of Italian Anusim. Lotoro is a pianist and conductor, who had studied the music of the Nazi concentration camps. The community now includes descendants of Neofiti (Italian crypto-Jews) and San Nicandro Jews.

A very old oil painting of St. Mary hangs in the niche that once held the Torah ark. The Church has refused to allow the painting to be moved to another church or to a museum. Moreover, the building is a protected historic site, so the Jewish congregation is not allowed to move the painting. The solution has been to hang a large image of a menorah in front of the painting.

== Architecture ==
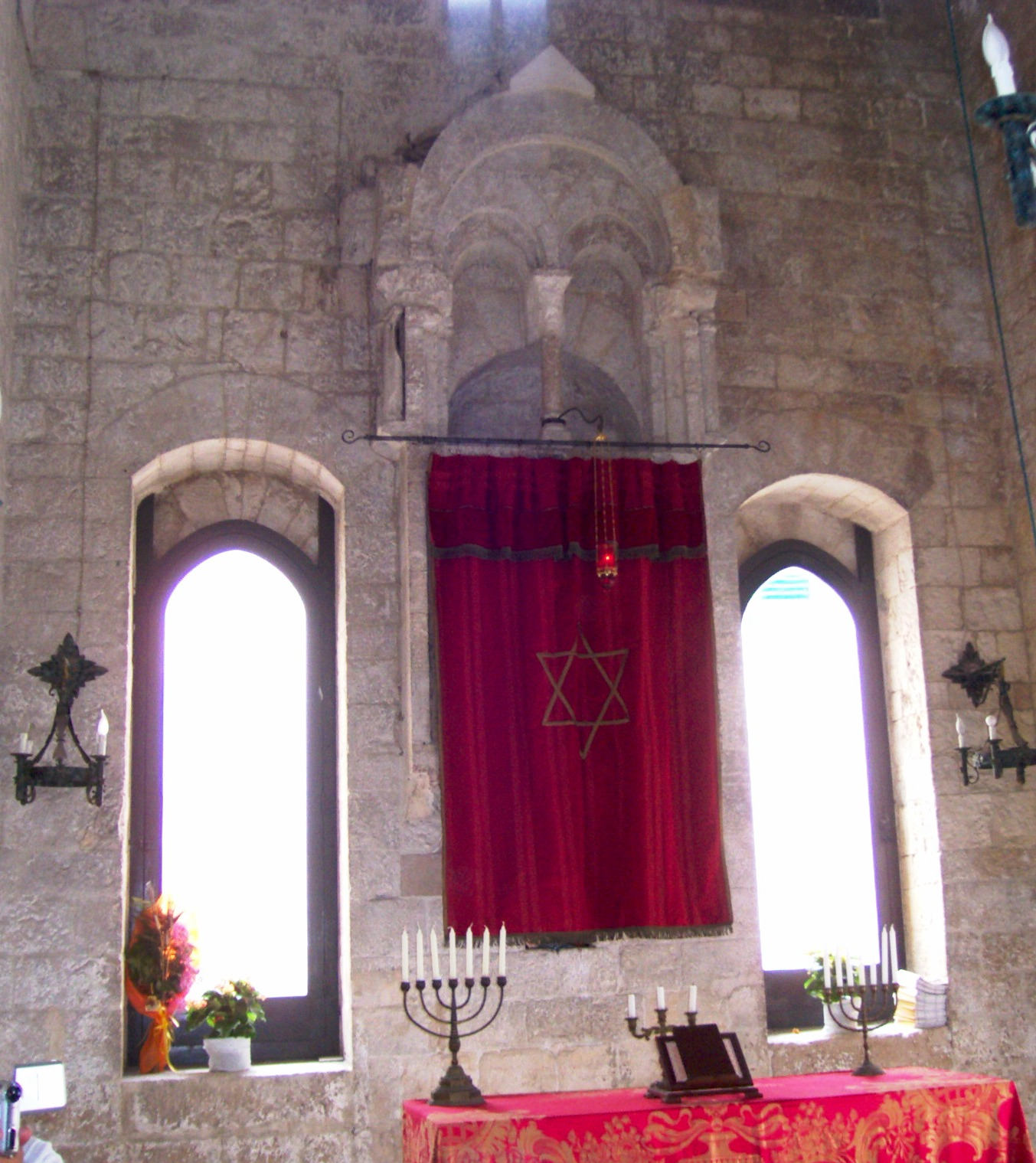
Interior of the synagogue

The synagogue was converted for use as a church without significant alterations being made to the interior of the building. The Gothic synagogue is a rectangular, masonry building, 14.9 by 6.4 m (49 by 21 ft). The barrel-vaulted ceiling is 11 m (36 ft) high. There are three windows in the eastern wall, one on each side of the Torah ark, and one above it.

The cut-stone surround for the Torah ark exists. The ark was once reached by a flight of seven steps. It featured a central column that divided two separate arched openings. The building next door once contained the synagogue's women's gallery and, in the basement, the stairs and pool of the medieval mikveh survive.

== See also ==
- History of the Jews in Italy
- List of synagogues in Italy
