= Dialoghi di Trani =

Festival in Italy

Dialoghi di Trani is an annual festival held in Trani, Italy. First held in 2002, the festival's goal is to spread and encourage cultural and literary knowledge, engage in debates on social issues and ultimately increase civic engagement and awareness in the local territory.
The event, which lasts one week, is organized by the cultural association La Maria del Porto, located in Trani. It also includes Dialokids, a cultural program targeted at young children, and the competition for the Premio Fondazione Megamark, a literary prize awarded to an outstanding debuting writer.

== Location ==
The festival takes place in Trani, a town north of Bari, by the Adriatic Sea, in the Southern-Italian region of Apulia. Throughout the festival, several public spaces of the town, such as the square adjacent to Trani Cathedral, the Swabian Castle, and the public library, are used for debates, book launches, the showing of films, and other events. However, given the festival's growing importance, some venues now extend as far away as neighboring cities, including Andria, Bisceglie, and Corato.

== Editions ==
Each year's edition of the event addresses a specific topic that is explored and debated throughout the week of the festival.

- 2002: first edition of the event.
- 2003: the second edition revolved around the relationship between the West and East of the world, their differences as well as similarities in culture, history, religion.
- 2004: the third edition was titled "borders" (confini, in Italian) and centered on what borders are, what they mean for the people living across them, and on a discussion of geographical places that constitute natural borders (such as the Alps or the Mediterranean Sea).
- 2005: the fourth edition addressed the role of technology and development in the third millennium.
- 2006: the fifth edition focused on the topic of cultural identity and, on the other hand, the meeting and blending of different cultures.
- 2007: the sixth edition addressed the complexities of ethics in modern globalized societies.
- 2008: the seventh edition aimed at bringing forward a discussion on the dynamics of power in society.
- 2009: the eighth edition focused on democracy and the role of science, knowledge and communication in shaping democratic regimes as we know them today.
- 2010: the ninth edition inquired the meaning of passion in all its forms and shapes: from love and desire, to food, to leisure.
- 2011: the tenth edition focused on time, by analysing its meaning from a philosophical standpoint and a more practical and economic one.
- 2012: the eleventh edition revolved around the power of change, both in positive and negative terms, and its overall consequences.
- 2013: the twelfth edition hosted debates on Europe as a continent and the European Union more specifically, while taking primarily the perspective of the South of Italy.
- 2014: the thirteenth edition was titled "Future" and asked questions such as how people look at their future, what has the power to shape it and what can change it.
- 2015: the fourteenth edition was centered on the topics of birth and generation.
- 2016: the fifteenth edition discussed the importance of sharing and its origins in the sense of belonging that ties together the human race.
- 2017: the sixteenth edition focused on beauty and its conception throughout different times and places.
- 2018: the seventeenth edition addressed the topic of fear, from its negative effects (insecurity, closure) and ways to tackle them, to its more positive sides.
- 2019: the eighteenth edition focused on the topic of responsibility in all its different shapes, and on the challenges it generates for individuals and communities.

== Famous Guests ==
Several well known personalities have taken part in the cultural festival since its beginning.

- Massimo Cacciari, Italian philosopher, politician and former mayor of Venice, attended several years of the Dialoghi.
- Dacia Maraini, a famous Italian writer, discussed the difficult relation between mothers and daughters during the first edition of the cultural event in 2002.
- Helen Mirren, British actress and Academy Award winner, took part in the 18th edition of the Dialoghi.
- Gustavo Zagrebelsky, Italian constitutionalist, participated in the 19th edition.
- Luigi Zoja, Italian psychoanalyst, discussed the effects of technology on psychoanalysis during the 2018 edition of the event.
