= Giovanni Bovio =

Italian politician (1837–1903)

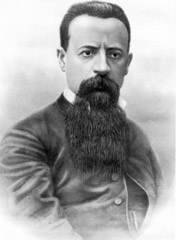
Giovanni Bovio

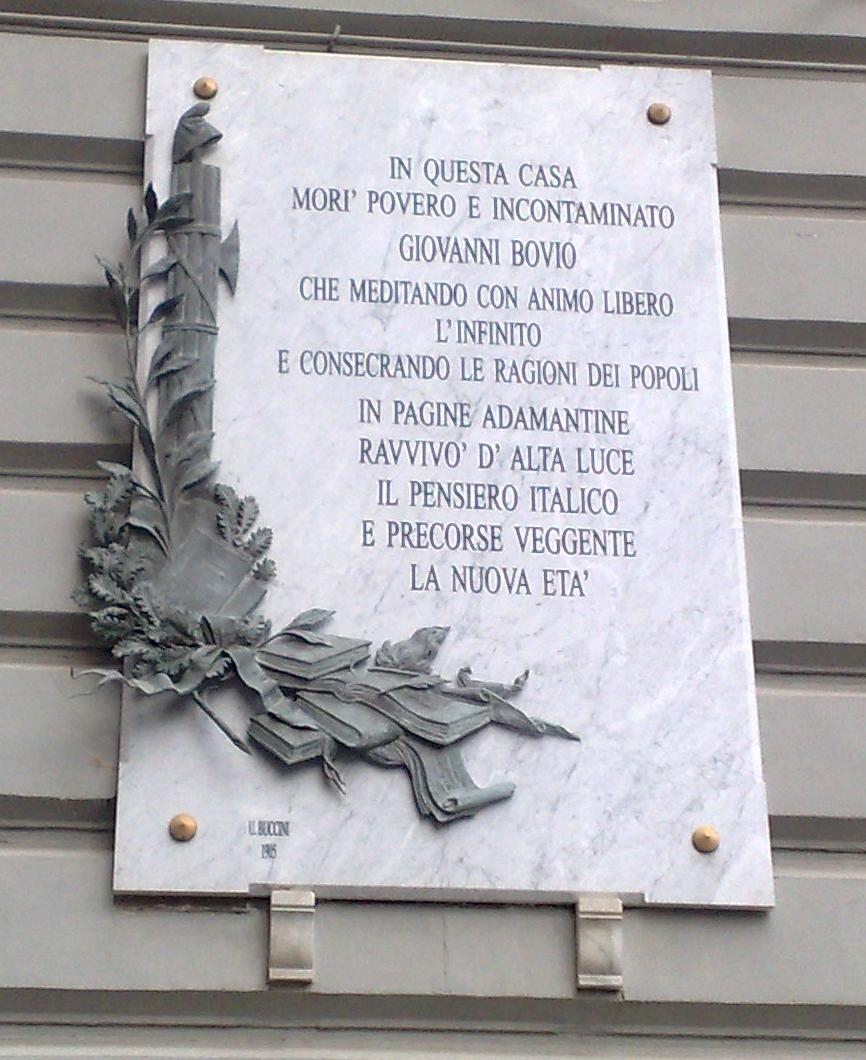
Plaque in Piazza Giovanni Bovio of Naples

Giovanni Bovio (6 February 1837 – 15 April 1903) was an Italian philosopher and a politician of the Italian Republican Party.

Bovio was born in Trani. He was a member of the Chamber of Deputies of the Parliament of the Kingdom of Italy. He wrote a philosophical work in 1864 called Il Verbo Novello.

He was involved in setting up the radical movement "Fascio della democrazia" in 1883. In 1895, he founded the Italian Republican Party.

A plaque on the house on Piazza Giovanni Bovio number 38 recalls his death in that house:

In this house died, poor and uncontaminated Giovanni Bovio, who by meditating with free spirit the infinite and consecrating the reasons of the peoples in adamantine pages, revived with great splendor Italian thought and was a prescient seer of the new age. U Buccini 1905

Bovio was a Freemason initiated to the 33rd degree of the Scottish Rite, after having joined the lodge Caprera of Trani in 1863. His grandfather Francesco Bovio was also a Freemason.

== Ancestors and descendants of Giovanni Bovio ==
- Francesco Maria Bovio (1750s - 1830) - Giovanni Bovio's grandfather - professor of law, Latin, Ancient Greek and literature at Regie Scuole of Matera and of the University of Altamura. He was also a judge and a Freemason, member of the masonic lodge Oriente di Altamura. Moreover, he fought for the Parthenopean Republic, by joining in the so-called Altamuran Revolution (1799)
- Nicola Bovio - Giovanni Bovio's father
- Scipione Bovio - Giovanni Bovio's uncle
- Corso Bovio - Giovanni Bovio's son
- Libero Bovio - Giovanni Bovio's son - poet and musician
- Giovanni Bovio (... - 1970s) - Giovanni Bovio's grandson - lawyer
- Libero Corso Bovio (1948-2007) - Giovanni Bovio's great-grandson - lawyer, journalist and professor

== See also ==
- Libero Bovio
- Libero Corso Bovio
- Altamuran Revolution

== External lilnks ==
Media related to Giovanni Bovio at Wikimedia Commons
