= The Mystery of San Nicandro =

- Created by: Matter of Fact Media
- Written by: Roger Pyke
- Directed by: Roger Pyke
- Narrated by: Paul Essiembre
- Music by: Alex Khaskin
- Country of origin: Canada
- Original languages: English; Italian; Hebrew

Production
- Producer: Vanessa Dylyn
- Cinematography: Max Armstrong
- Editor: Andy Bely
- Running time: 67 minutes

Original release
- Network: documentary
- Release: 14 November 2012

The Mystery of San Nicandro is a feature-length documentary inspired by the book, The Jews of San Nicandro, written by John Davis, about a group of Italian Roman Catholics in a small village, who underwent a mass conversion to Judaism in Fascist Italy. And who over a period of twenty years of observing Jewish practices, left Italy and emigrated to the new state of Israel in 1949.

== Production ==
The Mystery of San Nicandro was shot in Toronto, Hamilton, San Nicandro, Calabria, Sicily, and Israel in 2012. The film was developed in association with documentary and was produced with the participation of The Bell Broadcast and New Media Fund, The Canada Media Fund, The Ontario Film and Media Development Corporation, The Rogers Cable Network Fun, and The Canadian Film or Video Production Tax Credits.

== Reception ==
Independent television reviewer James Bawden, in regards to The Mystery of San Nicandro, proclaimed that, "there is hope for Canadian TV."
