= Press laws =

Legal term

Press laws are the laws concerning the licensing of books and the liberty of expression in all products of the printing-press, especially newspapers. The liberty of the press has always been regarded by political writers as of supreme importance. Give me liberty to know, to utter, and to argue freely according to conscience, above all other liberties, says Milton in the Areopagitica.

Before the invention of printing, the Church assumed the right to control the expression of all opinion distasteful to her. When the printing press was invented, German printers established themselves at various important centres of western Europe, where already numbers of copyists were employed in multiplying manuscripts. In 1473 Louis XI granted letters patent (giving the right of printing and selling books) to Uldaric Quring (Ulrich Gering), who three years earlier had set up a press in the Sorbonne (the theological faculty of the university at Paris), and before long Paris had more than fifty presses at work. The Church and universities soon found the output of books beyond their control. In 1496 Pope Alexander VI began to be restrictive, and in 1501 he issued a bull against unlicensed printing, which introduced the principle of censorship. Between 1524 and 1548 the Imperial Diet in Germany drew up various stringent regulations; and in France, prohibited by edict, under penalty of death, the printing of books. This was too severe, however, and shortly afterwards the Sorbonne was given the right of deciding, a system which lasted to the Revolution.

== Censorship ==
Censorship was either restrictive or corrective, i.e., it interfered to restrict or prevent publication, or it enforced penalties after publication. Repression of free discussion was regarded as so necessary a part of government that Sir Thomas More in his Utopia makes it punishable with death for a private individual to criticize the conduct of the ruling power. Under Mary, printing was confined to members of the Stationers Company, founded by royal charter in 1556. Under Elizabeth the Star Chamber assumed the right to confine printing to London, Oxford and Cambridge, to limit the number of printers and presses, to prohibit all publications issued without proper licence, and to enter houses to search for unlicensed presses and publications.

== See also ==
- Freedom of the press
- Modern Law Review
