= Trani =

- Comune
- Città di Trani
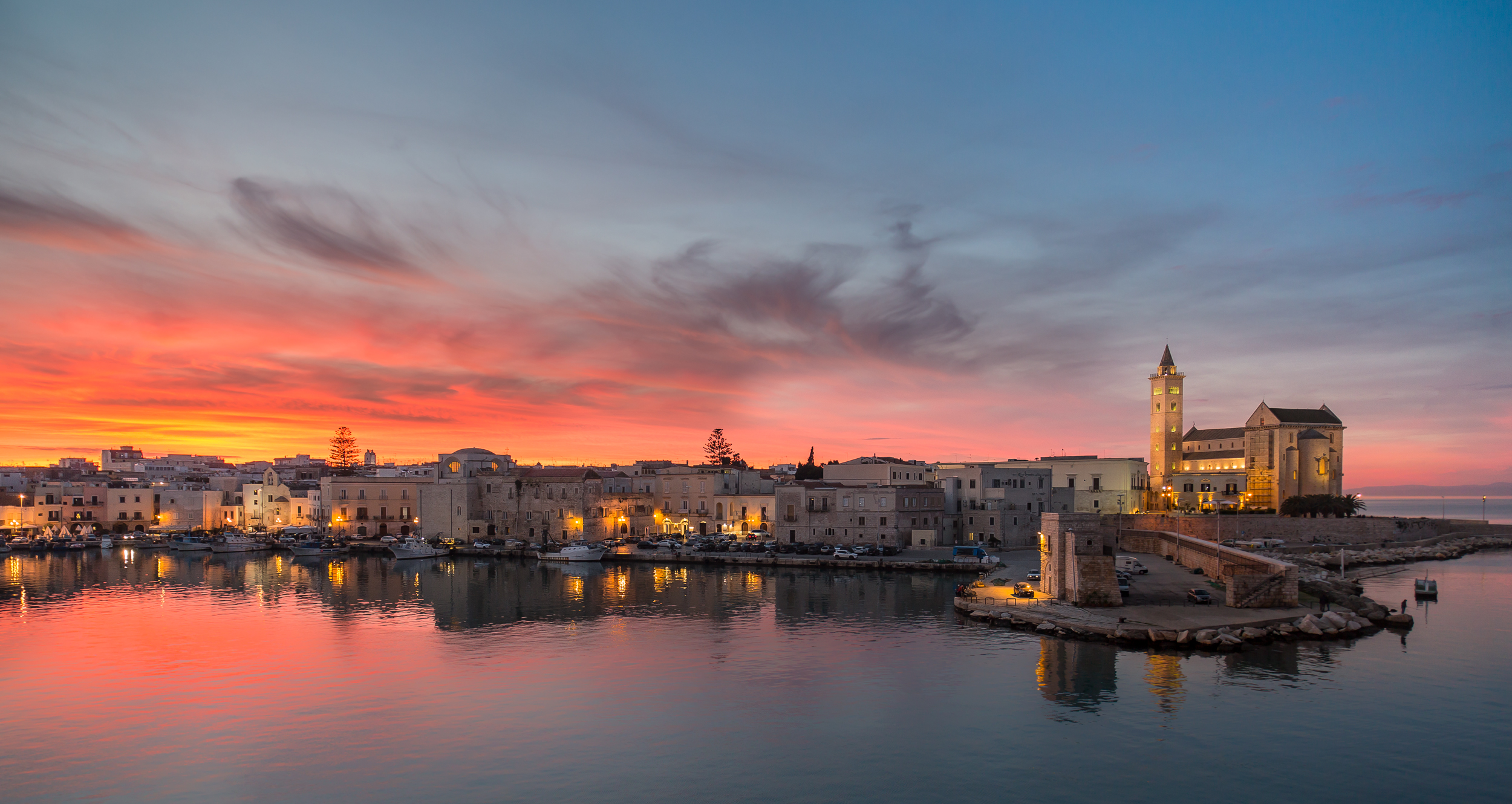
- A view of Trani

- Flag Coat of arms

- Trani within the Province of Barletta-Andria-Trani

- Location within Italy Location within Apulia
- Coordinates: 41°16′N 16°25′E
- Country: Italy
- Region: Apulia
- Province: Barletta-Andria-Trani (BT)
- Frazioni: Capirro

Government
  - Mayor: Marco Galiano (PD)

Area
  - Total: 103.41 km^{2} (39.93 sq mi)
- Elevation: 7 m (23 ft)

Population (31 December 2017)
  - Total: 56,031
  - Density: 541.83/km^{2} (1,403.3/sq mi)
- Demonym: Tranesi
- Time zone: UTC+1 (CET)
  - Summer (DST): UTC+2 (CEST)
- Postal code: 76125
- Dialing code: 0883
- Patron saint: Saint Nicholas the Pilgrim, Saint crucifix of Colonna
- Saint day: June 2
- Website: Official website

Trani (Italian pronunciation: [ˈtraːni]; Barese: Tran) is a seaport of Apulia, Southern Italy, on the Adriatic Sea, 40 kilometres (25 mi) by railway west-northwest of Bari. It is one of the capital cities of the province of Barletta-Andria-Trani (BT).

Trani is a member of Cittaslow.

== History ==
=== Overview ===
The city of Turenum appears for the first time in the Tabula Peutingeriana, a 13th-century copy of an ancient Roman itinerary. The name, also spelled Tirenum, was that of the Greek hero Diomedes. The city was later occupied by the Lombards and the Byzantines. First certain news of an urban settlement in Trani, however, trace back only to the 9th century.

The most flourishing age of Trani was the 11th century, when it became an episcopal see in place of Canosa, destroyed by the Saracens. Its port, well placed for the Crusades, then developed greatly, becoming the most important on the Adriatic Sea. In the year 1063 Trani issued the Ordinamenta et consuetudo maris, which is "the oldest surviving maritime law code of the Latin West". There was also Jewish community in Trani, which was under the protection of the king until it was given to the Archbishop Samarus during the reign of Henry VI at the end of the 12th century. In that period many great families from the main Italian Maritime Republics (Amalfi, Pisa, Genova, Ragusa and Venice) established themselves in Trani. Trani, in turn, maintained a consul in Venice from 12th century. The presence of other consulates in many northern Europe centres, even in England and Netherlands, shows Trani's trading and political importance in the Middle Ages. Emperor Frederick II built a massive castle in Trani. Under his rule, in the early 13th century, the city reached its highest point of wealth and prosperity.

There was some economic progress during the nineteenth century, and by 1881 the population had reached 25,647. Trani at this time was an important trading point for wines, fruits and grain.

=== Jewish history ===
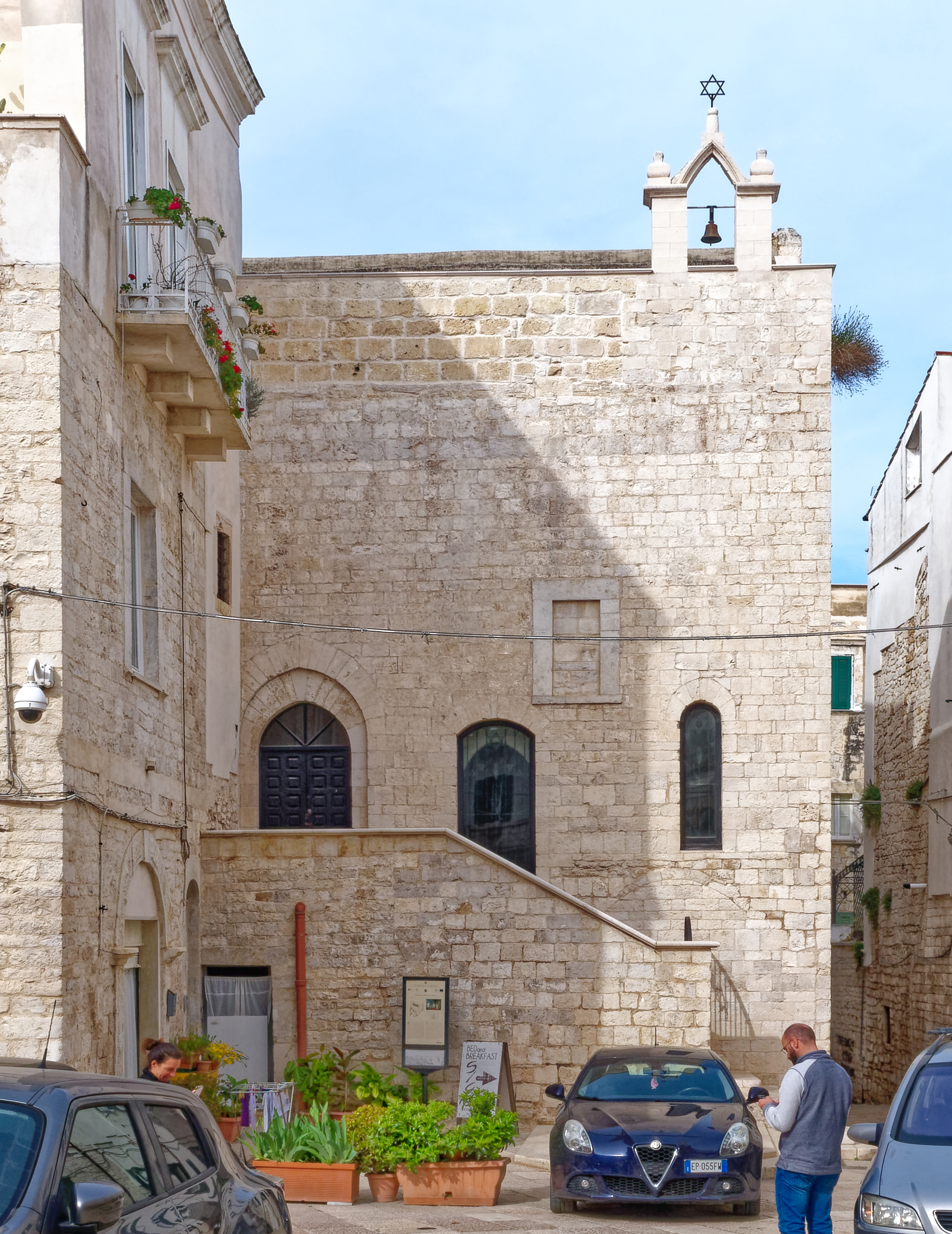
Scolanova Synagogue.

Benjamin of Tudela visited Trani in around 1159, following this visit he found 200 Jewish families living there. By the 12th century, Trani already housed one of the largest Jewish communities of Southern Italy, and was the birthplace of one of the greatest medieval rabbis of Italy: Rabbi Isaiah ben Mali di Trani (c. 1180–1250), a prolific and prominent commentator and halakhic authority. The great talmudist Rabbi Moses ben Joseph di Trani (1505–1585) was born in Thessaloniki, three years after his family had fled there from Trani due to antisemitic persecution.

Trani entered a crisis under the Anjou and Aragonese rule (14th–16th centuries), as its Jewish component was persecuted under Dominican pressure. Under the House of Bourbon, however, Trani recovered a certain splendour, thanks to the generally improved condition of Southern Italy economy and the construction of several magnificent buildings. Trani was province capital until the Napoleonic age, when Joachim Murat deprived it of this status in favour of Bari. In 1799, moreover, the French troops provoked a massacre of Trani's population, as it had adhered to the Neapolitan Republic.

The Scolanova Synagogue survives and, after many centuries as a church, has been rededicated as a synagogue. The church of Sant'Anna is another medieval former synagogue which was deconsecrated and returned to the Jewish community in 2004.

== Geography ==
Located by the Adriatic Coast, between Barletta and Bisceglie, Trani borders with the municipalities of Andria, Barletta, Bisceglie and Corato, in the Province of Bari.

According to the Köppen climate classification, Trani features a hot-summer Mediterranean climate (Csa), bordering on a cool semi-arid climate (BSk) and a humid subtropical climate (Cfa).

== Main sights ==
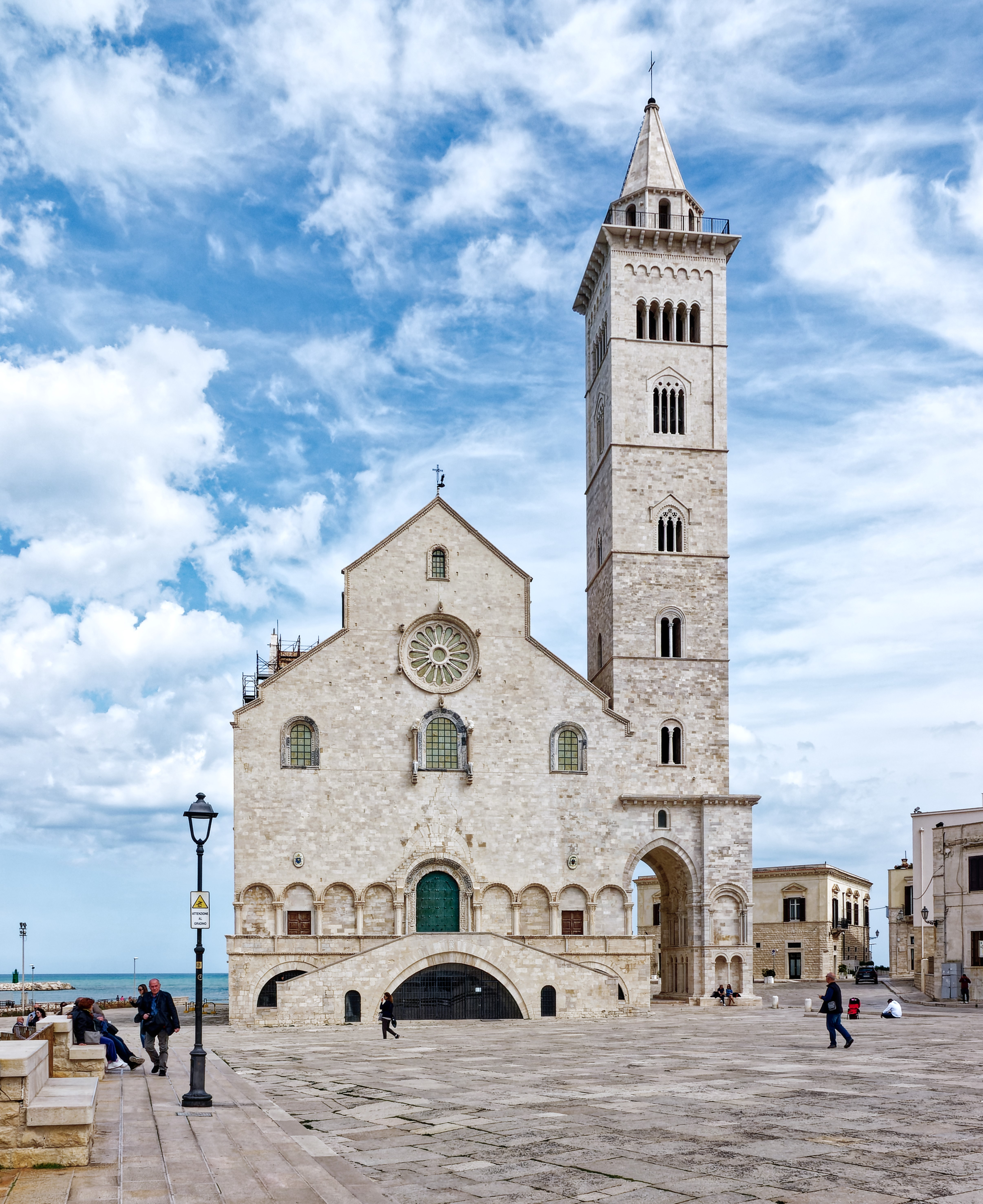
The cathedral

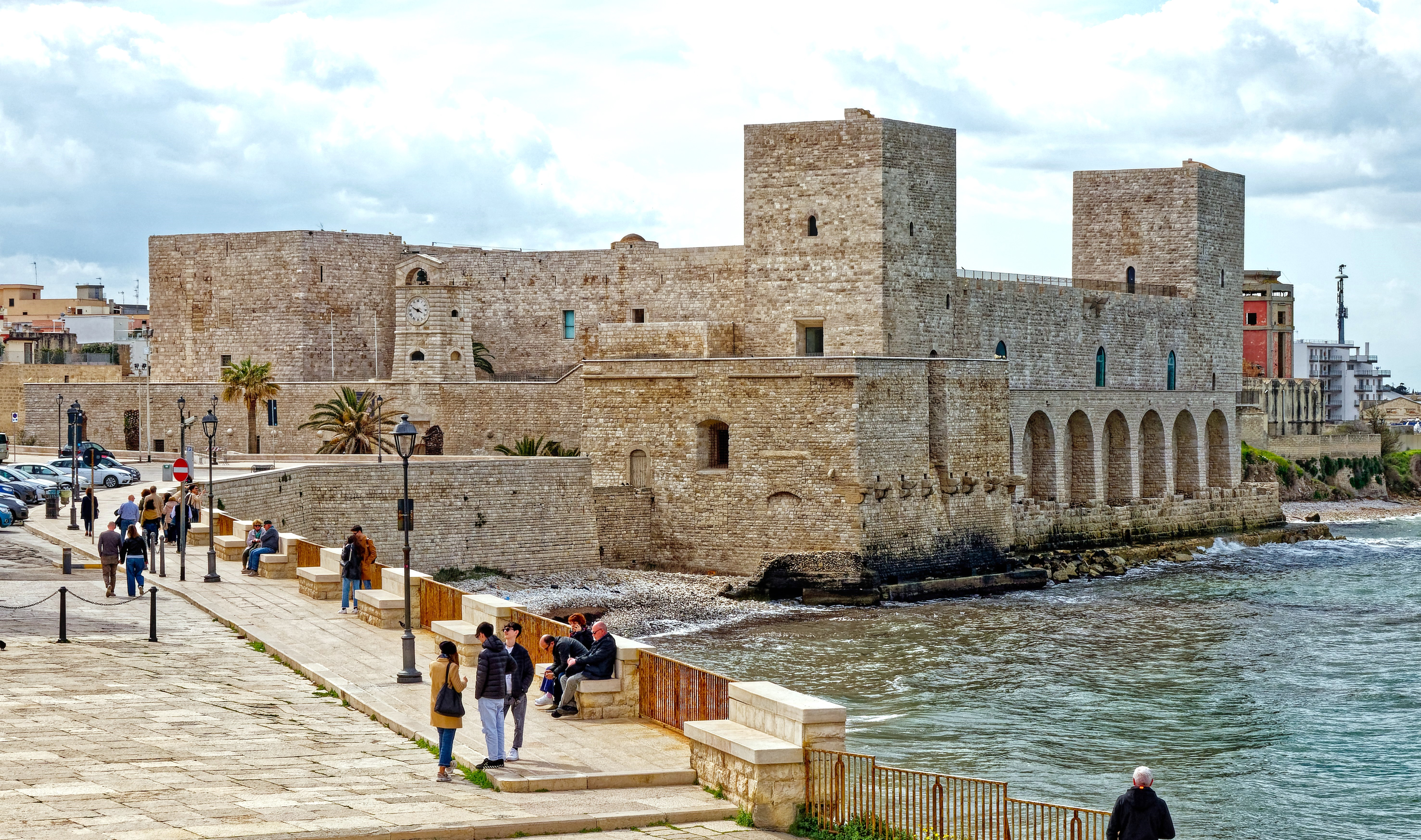
The old fort

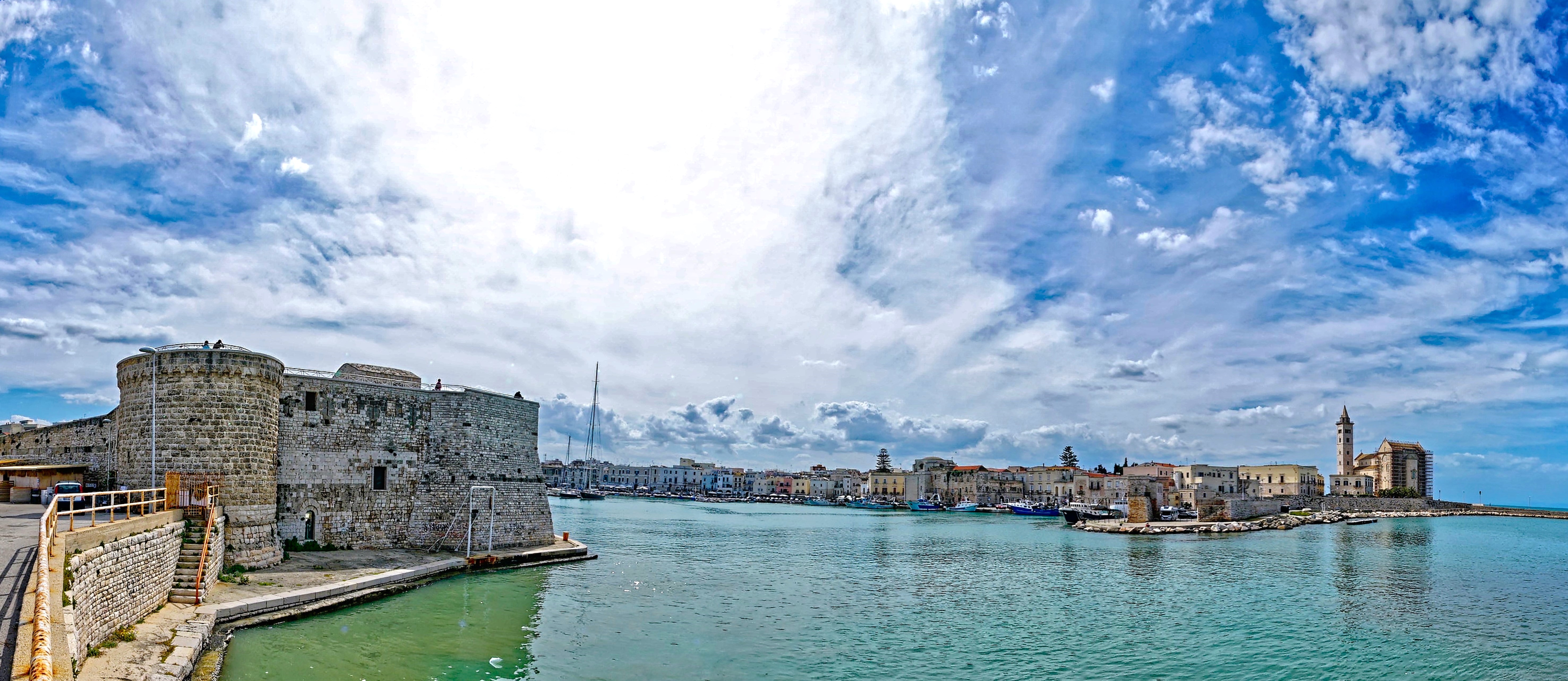
Panoramic entrance to the harbour of Trani.

Trani has lost its old city walls and bastions, but the 13th-century fort has been extensively restored as a museum and performance venue and is open to the public. Some of the streets in and around the Ghetto area remain much as they were in the medieval period, and many of the houses display more or less of Norman decoration.

The main church is Trani Cathedral, dedicated to Saint Nicholas the Pilgrim, a Greek who died in Trani in 1094 while on his way on pilgrimage to Rome, and some years later was canonized by Urban II. It lies on a raised open site near the sea, and was consecrated, before its completion, in 1143. It is a basilica with three apses, built in the characteristic white local limestone. It has also a large crypt and a lofty tower, the latter erected in 1230–1239 by the architect whose name appears on the ambo in the cathedral of Bitonto, Nicolaus Sacerdos. It has an arch under it, being supported partly on the side wall of the church, and partly on a massive pillar. The arches of the Romanesque portal are beautifully ornamented, in a manner suggestive of Arab influence; the bronze doors, executed by Barisanus of Trani in 1175, rank among the best of their period in Southern Italy. The capitals of the pillars in the crypt are fine examples of the Romanesque. The interior of the cathedral has been widely modernized, but the crypt remains similar to the origins and was a renowned repository of relics, among which the body of the martyr St. Febronia of Nisibis. One can still enjoy a precious reliquary of the eighteenth century and an oval painting depicting the Saint at the Diocesan Museum.

Near the harbor is the Gothic Palace of the Doges of Venice, which is now used as a seminary. The Church of Ognissanti which at one stage was the chapel of a Knights Templar hospital has a Romanesque relief of the Annunciation over the door. San Giacomo and San Francesco also have Romanesque façades; the latter, together with Sant'Andrea, have Byzantine domes.

== Economy ==
The territory of Trani produces an excellent wine, Moscato di Trani; and its figs, olive oil, almonds and grain are also profitable articles of trade.

== People ==
- Giustina Rocca, world's first female lawyer died in 1502
- Manfred, King of Sicily and son of Frederick II, who married Helena Ducas here in 1259
- Giovanni Bovio, philosopher and politician
- Antonio Piccinni, painter, born in 1846 and died in 1920
- Rosalino Cellamare, singer
- Emilio Covelli, anarchist and socialist
- Leone Di Lernia, singer
- Jennie George, Australian politician and Australian trade unionist
- Domenico Sarro, composer
- Riccardo Scamarcio, actor and producer
- Rabbi Isaiah ben Mali di Trani (c. 1180–1250), a prolific and prominent commentator and halakhic authority

== See also ==
- U.S. Calcio Trani
- Trani railway station
- Dialoghi di Trani
