= Timeline of Ferrara =

Italian city

The following is a timeline of the history of the city of Ferrara in the Emilia-Romagna region of Italy.

== Prior to 17th century ==
- 7th century
  - San Giorgio Cathedral built.
  - Benedictine Pomposa Abbey founded near Ferrara (approximate date).
- 624 – Roman Catholic diocese of Ferrara active.
- 753 – Lombards in power.
- 774 – Archbishop of Ravenna in power.
- 988 – Tedald of Canossa in power.
- 1055 – "Imperial privileges" granted.
- 1101 – Ferrara besieged by forces of Matilda of Tuscany.
- 1115 – Ferrara becomes a "free commune."
- 1135 – New San Giorgio Cathedral consecrated on the Piazza Maggiore.
- 1158 – Frederick I, Holy Roman Emperor in power.
- 1196 – Azzo VI of Este becomes podesta.
- 1227 – San Francesco church built.
- 1240 – City besieged; Azzo VII d'Este in power.
- 1243 – Palazzo Ducale built.
- 1249 – Sant'Antonio in Polesine monastery founded.
- 1264 – Obizzo II d'Este, Marquis of Ferrara in power.
- 1278 – Ferarra becomes part of the Papal States.
- 1283 – Torre del Rigobello (tower) built.
- 1313 – Riccobaldo da Ferrara begins writing his Chronica parva Ferrariensis
- 1317 – Obizzo III d'Este, Marquis of Ferrara in power.
- 1326 – Palazzo della Ragione built.
- 1333 – "Papal forces making a bid for more control in the province were defeated at Ferrara."
- 1382 – Plague.
- 1385
  - Economic unrest.
  - Castello Estense (castle) and Palazzo Schifanoia construction begins.
- 1391
  - University of Ferrara established.
  - Palazzo Paradiso built.
- 1393 – Niccolò III d'Este, Marquis of Ferrara in power.
- 1435 – Castello Nuovo (castle) built.
- 1438 – Religious Council of Ferrara held.
- 1441 – Leonello d'Este, Marquis of Ferrara in power.
- 1450 – Borso d'Este in power.
- 1452 – Birth of future religious leader Savonarola.
- 1461 – Certosa of Ferrara built.
- 1471
  - Printing press in operation.
  - Ercole I d'Este, Duke of Ferrara in power.
  - Via Coperta walkway built.
- 1482 – War of Ferrara begins.
- 1484 – War of Ferrara ends; Venetian forces win.
- 1492 – Addizione Erculea development begins.
- 1493 – Palazzo dei Diamanti construction begins.
- 1516 – Ariosto's poem Orlando Furioso published in Ferrara.
- 1570 – November: 1570 Ferrara earthquake.
- 1598 – Ferrara becomes part of the Papal States.

== 17th–19th centuries ==
- 1602 – Teatro della Sala Grande (theatre) built.
- 1608 – Castel Tedaldo demolished.
- 1753 – Biblioteca Comunale Ariostea (library) opens in the Palazzo Paradiso.
- 1771 – University of Ferrara Botanic Garden founded.
- 1796 – City "occupied by Napoleonic troops" (until 1815).
- 1797 – 2nd Battalion of the Polish Legions founded in Ferrara.
- 1798 – Teatro Comunale (Ferrara) (theatre) opens.
- 1823 – Accademia delle Scienze di Ferrara (learned society) formed.
- 1836 – Pinacoteca Nazionale di Ferrara (museum) established in the Palazzo dei Diamanti.
- 1838 – Teatro Montecatini (theatre) active.
- 1846 – Teatro Bonacossi (theatre) active.
- 1847 – Austrians take city.
- 1859 – Austrians ousted; Ferrara becomes part of the Kingdom of Italy.
- 1861 – Population: 64,204.
- 1868 – Teatro Accademico (theatre) opens.
- 1872 – Museo di storia naturale (Ferrara) (museum) opens.
- 1897 – Population: 89,310.

== 20th century ==
- 1901
  - Ferrara-Codigoro Tram begins operating.
  - Ferrara Camera del Lavoro (labor centre) founded.
- 1903 – Ferrara Tram begins operating.
- 1907 – SPAL (football club) formed.
- 1911 – Population: 95,212.
- 1912 – Birth of future filmmaker Antonioni.
- 1920 – 20 December: Eccidio del Castello Estense (1920) (political unrest).
- 1925 – Corriere Padano newspaper begins publication.
- 1926 – Teatro Nuovo (Ferrara) (theatre) opens.

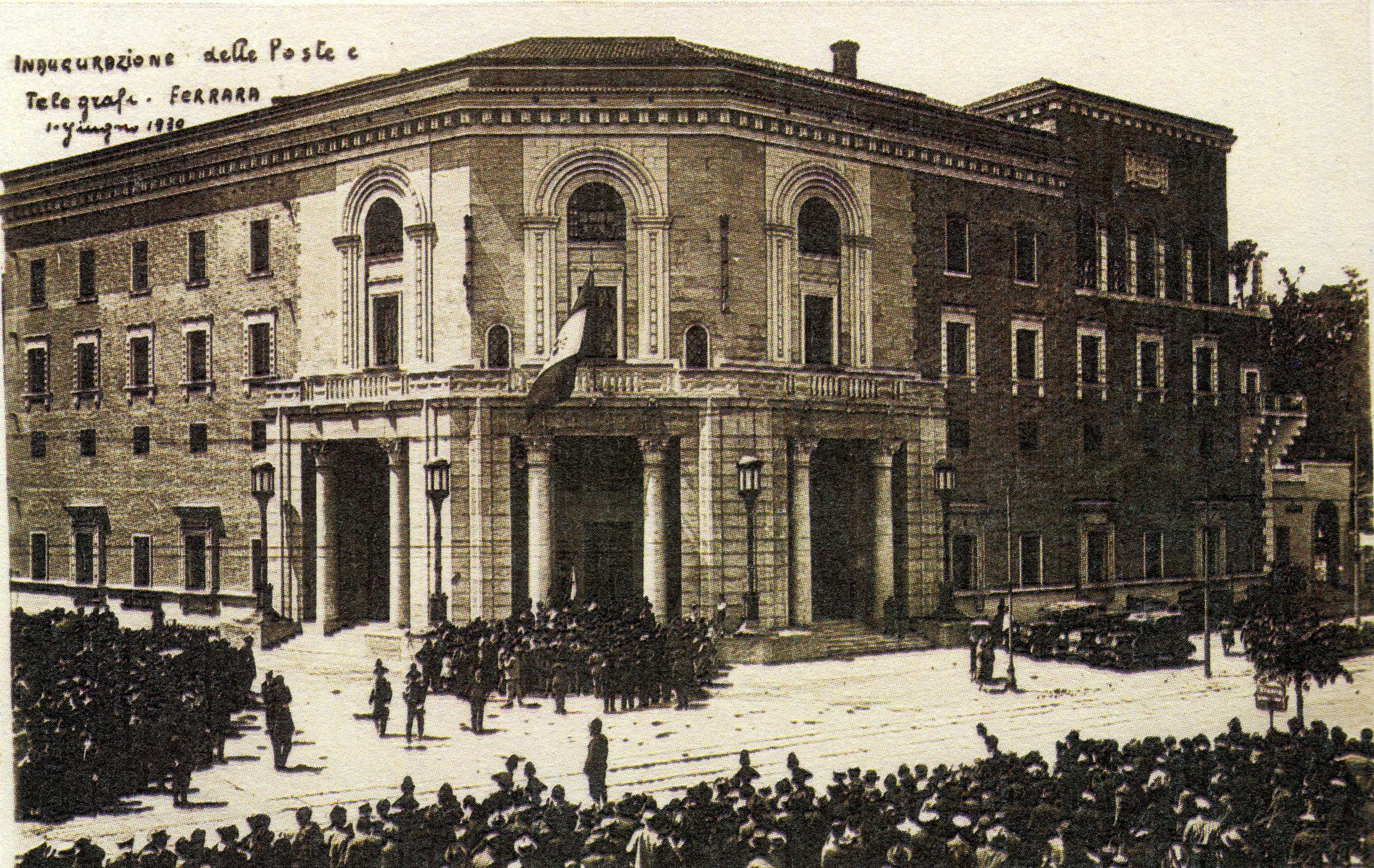
Ferrara in 1930

- 1928 – Stadio Paolo Mazza opens.
- 1943 – 15 November: Eccidio del Castello Estense (1943) (political unrest).
- 1944 – Bombing during World War II.
- 1955 – Archivio di Stato di Ferrara (state archives) established.
- 1961 – Population: 152,654.
- 1971 – City divided into 13 administrative frazione: Baura, Denore, Fossanova San Marco, Francolino, Gaibanella, Marrara, Mizzana, Pontegradella, Pontelagoscuro, Porotto, Quartesana, Ravalle, San Bartolomeo in Bosco, and San Martino; and 9 quartieri: Arianuova, Barco, Centro cittadino, Giardino, Mizzana, Porta Mare, Quacchio, San Giorgio, and Via Bologna.^{(it)}
- 1973 – Istituto di Storia Contemporanea di Ferrara (history society) founded.
- 1989 – La Nuova Ferrara newspaper begins publication.
- 1999 – Gaetano Sateriale becomes mayor.

== 21st century ==
- 2009 – Tiziano Tagliani becomes mayor.
- 2014 – Population: 133,485.
- 2019 – Alan Fabbri becomes mayor.

== See also ==
- History of Ferrara
- List of mayors of Ferrara
- List of dukes of Ferrara

Timelines of other cities in the macroregion of Northeast Italy:^{(it)}

- Emilia-Romagna region: Timeline of Bologna; Forlì; Modena; Parma; Piacenza; Ravenna; Reggio Emilia; Rimini
- Friuli-Venezia Giulia region: Timeline of Trieste
- Trentino-South Tyrol region: Timeline of Bolzano; Trento
- Veneto region: Timeline of Padua; Treviso; Venice; Verona; Vicenza

== Bibliography ==
=== in English ===
- John Blair; J. Willoughby Rosse (1858). "Ferrara". Index of Dates. London: H.G. Bohn.
- Jacob Burckhardt (1878) [1860]. The Civilization of the Renaissance in Italy. Vol. 1–2. London. (includes information about Ferrara circa 14th-16th century)
- "Ferrara". Hand-book for Travellers in Northern Italy (16th ed.). London: John Murray. 1897. OCLC 2231483.
- "Ferrara". Chambers's Encyclopaedia. London. 1901. hdl:2027/njp.32101065312892.
- Ismar Elbogen (1903), "Ferrara", Jewish Encyclopedia, vol. 5, New York, hdl:2027/mdp.49015002282276
- "Ferrara" . Encyclopædia Britannica. Vol. 10 (11th ed.). 1910. p. 283.
- Benjamin Vincent (1910), "Ferrara", Haydn's Dictionary of Dates (25th ed.), London: Ward, Lock & Co., hdl:2027/uc2.ark:/13960/t41r6xh8t
- "Ferrara". Northern Italy (14th ed.). Leipzig: Karl Baedeker. 1913. + 1870 ed.
- Paul Corner (1975). Fascism in Ferrara, 1915-1925.
- Beth F. Wood (1995). "Ferrara". In Trudy Ring; Robert M. Salkin (eds.). Southern Europe. International Dictionary of Historic Places. Vol. 3. Fitzroy Dearborn. pp. 246–250. ISBN 1884964052.
- Charles M. Rosenberg (1997). Este Monuments and Urban Development in Renaissance Ferrara. Cambridge University Press.
- Roy Domenico (2002). "Emilia Romagna: Ferrara". Regions of Italy: a Reference Guide to History and Culture. Greenwood. pp. 85+. ISBN 0313307334.
- Christopher Kleinhenz, ed. (2004). "Ferrara". Medieval Italy: an Encyclopedia. Routledge. pp. 335–336. ISBN 0415939291.
- Daniele Seragnoli (2007). "Ferrara". In Gaetana Marrone (ed.). Encyclopedia of Italian Literary Studies. Routledge. pp. 716–719. ISBN 978-1-57958-390-3.
- Anthony Colantuono (2010). "Estense patronage and the construction of the Ferrarese Renaissance, c. 1395-1598". In Charles M. Rosenberg (ed.). Court Cities of Northern Italy: Milan, Parma, Piacenza, Mantua, Ferrara, Bologna, Urbino, Pesaro, and Rimini. Cambridge University Press. ISBN 978-0-521-79248-6.
- Colum Hourihane, ed. (2012). "Ferrara". Grove Encyclopedia of Medieval Art and Architecture. Oxford University Press. ISBN 978-0-19-539536-5.

=== in Italian ===
- Antonio Frizzi [in Italian] (1787). Guida del forestiere per la città di Ferrara (in Italian). Per Francesco Pomatelli al Seminario.
- F. Avventi (1838). Il servitore di piazza: guida per Ferrara (in Italian). Pomatelli.
- Carlo Morbio (1840). Ferrara, Pavia e Lodi. Storie dei municipi italiani (in Italian) (2nd ed.). Milan: Manini. OCLC 758844008.
- Luigi Napoleone Cittadella (1868). Notizie amministrative, storiche, artische relative a Ferrara (in Italian). Ferrara.
- Giacinto Scelsi (1875). Statistica della provincia di Ferrara (in Italian).
- Nicola Bernardini, ed. (1890). "Provincia di Ferrara". Guida della stampa periodica italiana (in Italian). Lecce: R. Tipografia editrice salentina dei fratelli Spacciante. hdl:2027/njp.32101074983378.
- Giuseppe Agnelli (1906). Ferrara e Pomposa. Collezione di monografie illustrate. Ser. 1a--Italia artistica 2 (in Italian) (3rd ed.). Bergamo: Istituto italiano d'arti grafiche.
- Annuario Socio-Economico Ferrarese 1999 (in Italian), Ferrara: Centro ricerche Documentazione e Studi
