= Vasino =

Vasino is a surname. Notable people with the surname include:

- Adriano Ciocca Vasino (born 1949), Italian Catholic bishop
- Gianni Vasino (1936–2025), Italian journalist, writer, and television presenter

== See also ==
- Vasino, Kichmengsko-Gorodetsky District, Vologda Oblast
- Vasini
