= Jolanda di Savoia =

- Comune
- Comune di Jolanda di Savoia
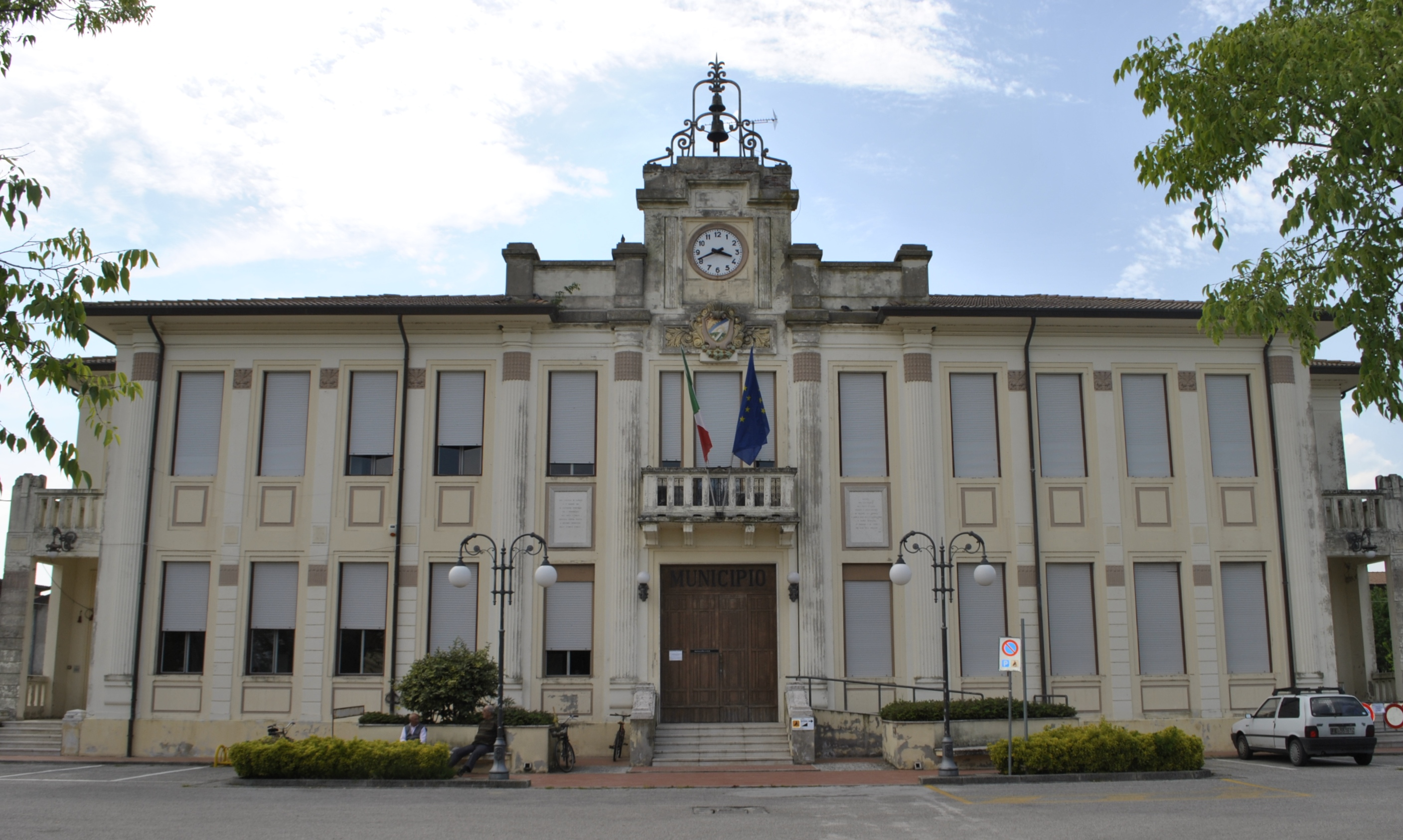
- Palazzo municipale in Jolanda di Savoia

- Flag Coat of arms

- Location within Italy Location within Emilia-Romagna
- Coordinates: 44°53′N 11°59′E
- Country: Italy
- Region: Emilia-Romagna
- Province: Ferrara (FE)

Government
  - Mayor: Paolo Pezzolato

Area
  - Total: 108.1 km^{2} (41.7 sq mi)
- Elevation: −1 m (−3.3 ft)

Population (31 August 2017)
  - Total: 2,877
  - Density: 26.61/km^{2} (68.93/sq mi)
- Demonym: Jolandini
- Time zone: UTC+1 (CET)
  - Summer (DST): UTC+2 (CEST)
- Postal code: 44037
- Dialing code: 0532
- Website: Official website

Jolanda di Savoia (Ferrarese: Jôlánda) is a comune (municipality) in the Province of Ferrara in the Italian region Emilia-Romagna, located about 70 kilometres (43 mi) northeast of Bologna and about 30 kilometres (19 mi) east of Ferrara. Founded as Le Venezie in 1903, it took its current name (from that of Princess Yolanda of Savoy) in 1911.

Jolanda di Savoia borders the following municipalities: Berra, Codigoro, Copparo, Fiscaglia, Formignana, Tresigallo.

With a minimum elevation of −3.4 metres (−11 ft), Joland di Savoia is the lowest point in Italy.
