= Ostellato =

- Comune
- Comune di Ostellato
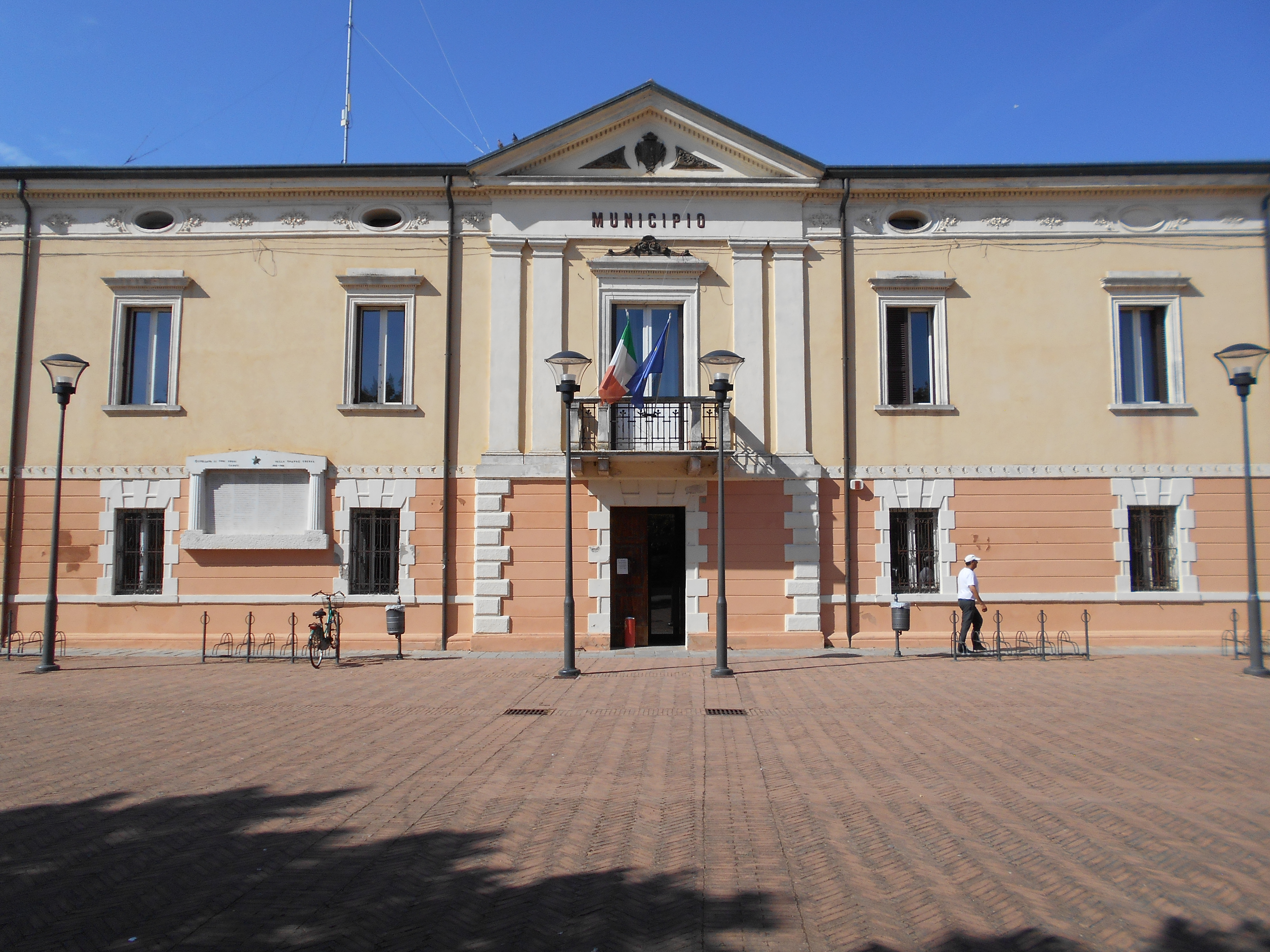
- Palazzo municipale in Ostellato

- Flag Coat of arms

- Location within Italy Location within Emilia-Romagna
- Coordinates: 44°45′N 11°56′E
- Country: Italy
- Region: Emilia-Romagna
- Province: Ferrara (FE)

Government
  - Mayor: Andrea Marchi

Area
  - Total: 173.34 km^{2} (66.93 sq mi)
- Elevation: 2 m (6.6 ft)

Population (31 December 2017)
  - Total: 6,030
  - Density: 34.8/km^{2} (90.1/sq mi)
- Demonym(s): Ostellatesi, ostolensi
- Time zone: UTC+1 (CET)
  - Summer (DST): UTC+2 (CEST)
- Postal code: 44020
- Dialing code: 0533
- Website: Official website

Ostellato (Ferrarese: Ustlà) is a comune (municipality) in the Province of Ferrara in the Italian region Emilia-Romagna, located about 50 kilometres (31 mi) northeast of Bologna and about 25 kilometres (16 mi) southeast of Ferrara.

Ostellato borders the following municipalities: Comacchio, Ferrara, Fiscaglia, Lagosanto, Masi Torello, Portomaggiore, Tresigallo.
