= Massa Fiscaglia =

- Frazione
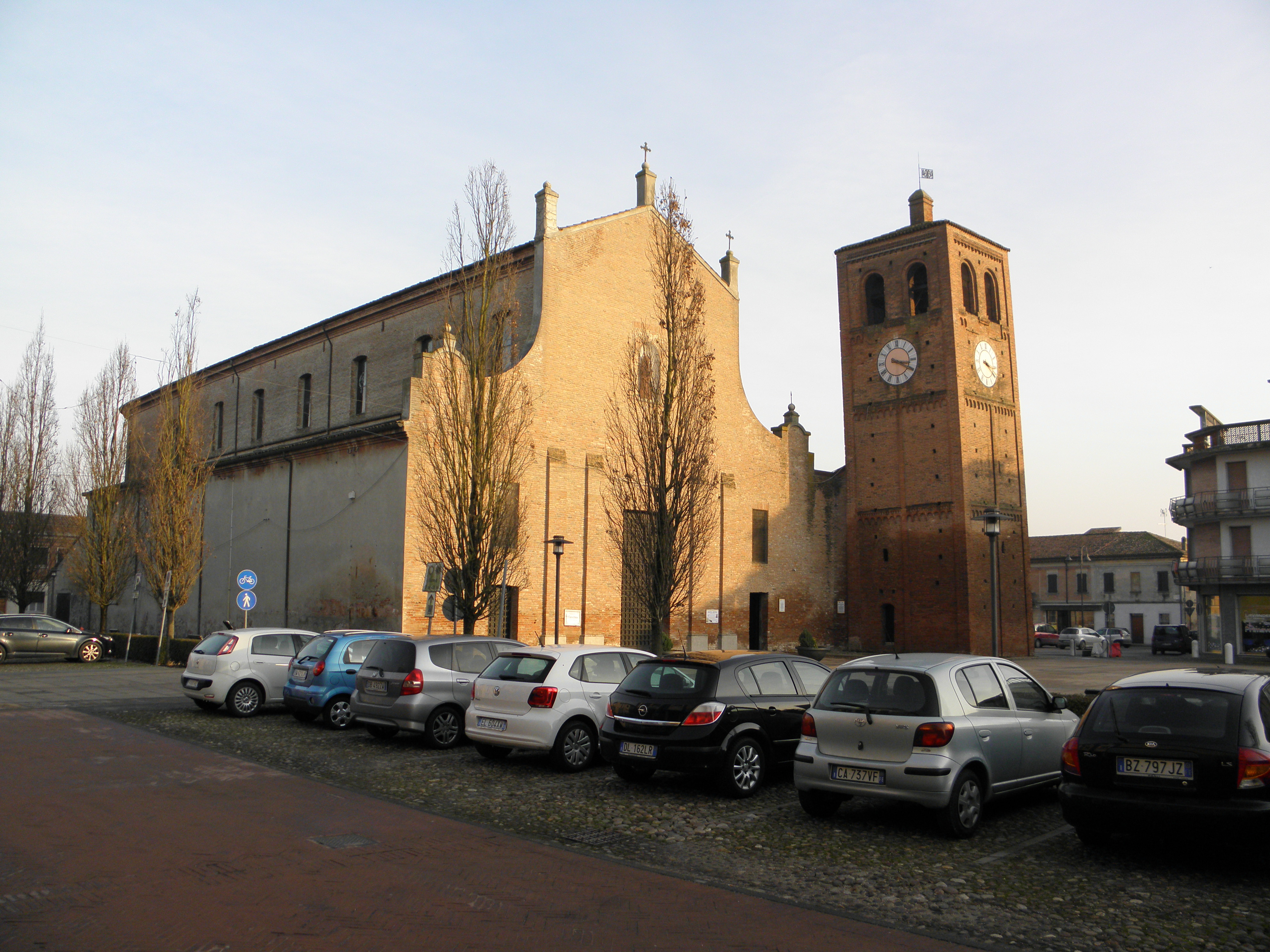
- Piazza Ferrari, the central square, with the Chiesa dei Santi Pietro e Giacomo (Saints Peter and James church) (17th-century) and the oldest church tower (13th-century)

- Location of Massa Fiscaglia in Italy
- Coordinates: 44°48′N 12°1′E
- Country: Italy
- Region: Emilia-Romagna
- Province: Ferrara (FE)
- Comune: Fiscaglia
- Elevation: 2 m (6.6 ft)

Population (31 May 2007)
  - Total: 3,781
- Demonym: Massesi
- Time zone: UTC+1 (CET)
  - Summer (DST): UTC+2 (CEST)
- Postal code: 44025
- Dialing code: 0533
- Patron saint: St. Peter
- Saint day: 29 June

Massa Fiscaglia is a frazione of the comune of Fiscaglia in the Province of Ferrara in the Italian region Emilia-Romagna, located about 60 kilometres (37 mi) northeast of Bologna and about 30 kilometres (19 mi) east of Ferrara. It was a separate comune until 2014.
