= Tresignana =

- Comune
- Comune di Tresignana
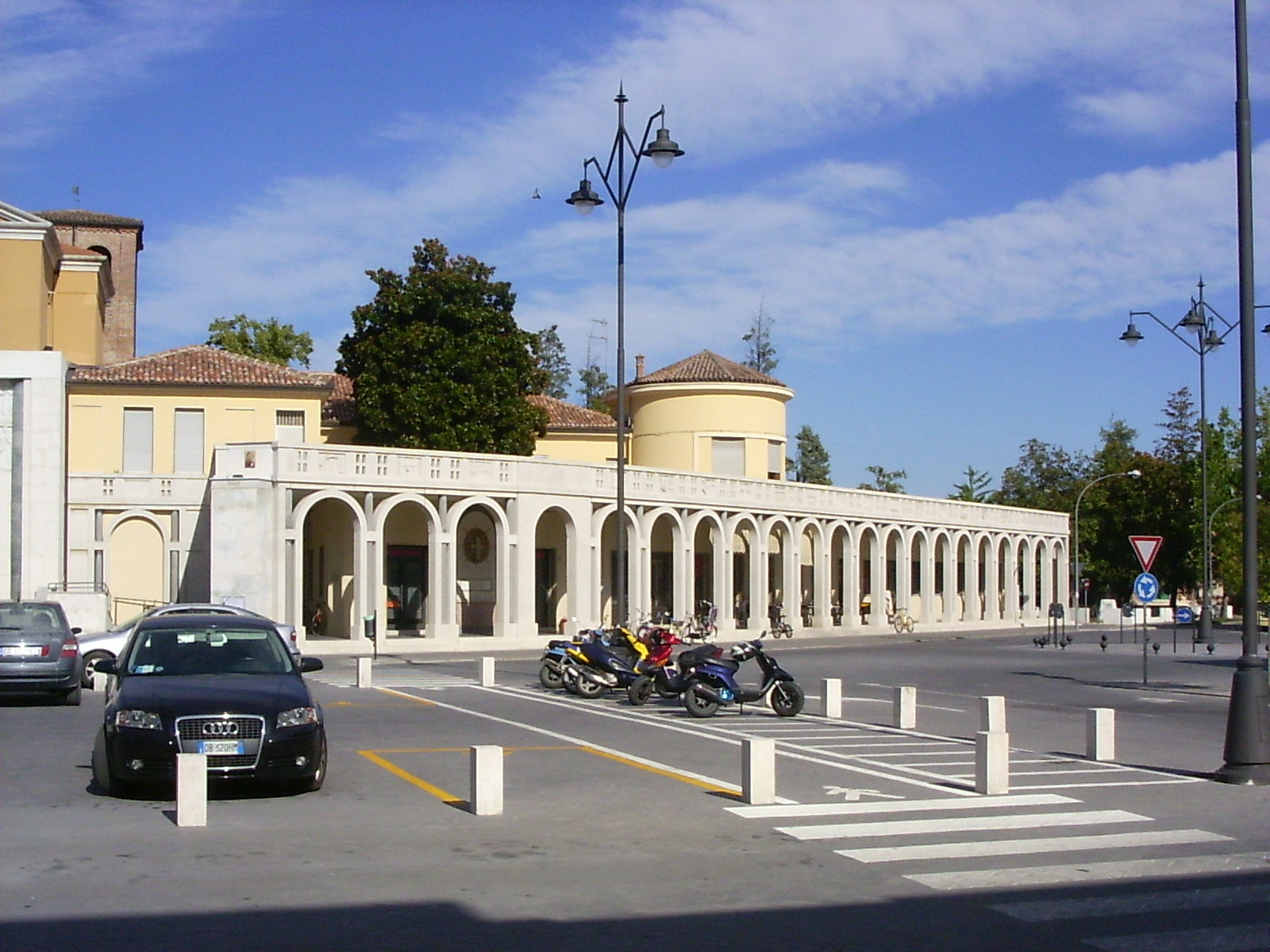
- View of Tresignana

- Location within Italy Location within Emilia-Romagna
- Coordinates: 44°48′57.53″N 11°53′40.99″E
- Country: Italy
- Region: Emilia-Romagna
- Province: Ferrara (FE)

Government
  - Mayor: Laura Perelli

Area
  - Total: 43.06 km^{2} (16.63 sq mi)

Population (30 November 2019)
  - Total: 6,968
  - Density: 161.8/km^{2} (419.1/sq mi)
- Time zone: UTC+1 (CET)
  - Summer (DST): UTC+2 (CEST)
- Postal code: 44039
- Dialing code: 0533

Tresignana is a comune (municipality) in the Province of Ferrara in the Italian region Emilia-Romagna. It was established on 1 January 2019 with the merger of the municipalities of Formignana and Tresigallo.
