= Goffredo Stabellini =

Italian footballer

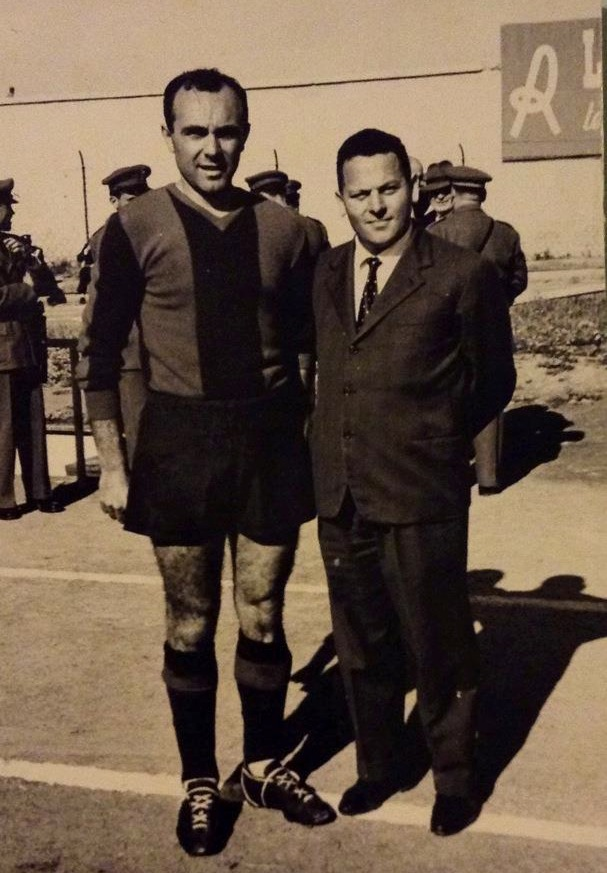
- Goffredo Stabellini.

Personal information
- Date of birth: 8 July 1925
- Place of birth: Formignana, Italy
- Date of death: 23 November 2012 (aged 87)
- Position: Midfielder

Senior career*
Years	Team	Apps	(Gls)
1945–1946	Bondenese		
1946–1947	Roma	4	(0)
1947–1948	Parma	28	(7)
1948–1954	Lecce		
1954–1958	Taranto	112	(4)
1958–1960	Vis Pesaro		
- * Club domestic league appearances and goals

Goffredo Stabellini (born 8 July 1925 in Formignana, died 23 November 2012) was an Italian professional football player.

He played for one season (1946/47, 4 games) in the Serie A for A.S. Roma.
