= Gianni Vasino =

Italian journalist (1936–2025)

Gianni Vasino, born Gian Antonio Vasino (5 November 1936 – 8 May 2025), was an Italian journalist, writer and television presenter.

== Life and career ==
Born in Serravalle, then a hamlet of Berra and today part of Riva del Po, in the province of Ferrara, he moved with his family to Sanremo, where he began collaborating with newspapers.

In 1960, he was called to Milan by the afternoon newspaper Corriere Lombardo. He returned to Genoa and joined Il Nuovo Cittadino, becoming a professional journalist. In 1968, he won the regional selections for the Rai competition for radio and television reporters. After an eight-month course in Rome, where he studied under Paolo Valenti and Umberto Eco, in 1970, he was hired by the Genoa office of Rai, where he covered crime news and sports events.

He was then chosen by Paolo Valenti to collaborate on 90º minuto.

To cover the many football events involving Milan, Inter, and Atalanta, he commuted for years between Milan and the Genoa newsroom. In 1974, he transferred to the sports editorial office in Milan, focusing on football and other sports, and providing commentary for aquatic sports. He covered the Olympics, world championships, and European championships. In 1992, he was appointed editor-in-chief and left on-screen work, retaining responsibility for aquatic sports and hosting the handball program Di mano in mano until 1995, when he resigned and returned to Genoa, where his family had always remained.

In 1989, he participated in the Monte Carlo Rally as the co-driver for Dario Cerrato in a Lancia Delta HF Integrale, sponsored by Shell and Rai 2 HD, achieving a 7th place overall.

For the TG2 news program at 1 PM, he created the show Come noi, dedicated to issues faced by people with disabilities.

In the following years, he collaborated with numerous local television and radio stations (Tele Romagna Mia in Cesena, Tele Nord, Tele Genova, Primo Canale, Antenna Blu, and Radio 19 in Genoa). From 1990 to 1995, he co-hosted the football program on Serie B, A Tutta B, with Mario Lino Corso, which aired on Monday afternoons on Rai 3.

In 1974, he authored the essay Mala Vita senza segreti (Virgilio Editions), and in 1976, Bandiere ombra e armatori fantasma (Mursia), addressing the phenomenon of "ships of shame."

In 2014, he summarized his professional experiences in the book Da 90º minuto alle Olimpiadi, cronache di 30 anni di sport (De Ferrari Editions).

Vasino died on 8 May 2025, at the age of 88.
