= Migliarino =

- Frazione
- Location of Migliarino in Italy
- Coordinates: 44°46′N 11°56′E
- Country: Italy
- Region: Emilia-Romagna
- Province: Ferrara (FE)
- Comune: Fiscaglia

Area
  - Total: 35.4 km^{2} (13.7 sq mi)
- Elevation: 2 m (6.6 ft)

Population (Dec. 2004)
  - Total: 3,681
  - Density: 104/km^{2} (269/sq mi)
- Time zone: UTC+1 (CET)
  - Summer (DST): UTC+2 (CEST)
- Postal code: 44027
- Dialing code: 0533

Migliarino is a frazione of the comune (municipality) of Fiscaglia in the Province of Ferrara in the Italian region Emilia-Romagna, located about 50 kilometres (31 mi) northeast of Bologna and about 25 kilometres (16 mi) southeast of Ferrara.

Migliarino is unrelated to, but shares its toponym with, the Tuscan Parco naturale di Migliarino, San Rossore, Massaciuccoli.
