= Radames Costa =

Italian politician and trade unionist (1930–2020)

Member of the Legislative Assembly of Emilia-Romagna
- In office 1980–1990

Mayor of Ferrara
- In office 1970–1980
- Preceded by: Giuseppe Ferrari
- Succeeded by: Claudio Vecchi

President of the Province of Ferrara
- In office 1967–1970
- Preceded by: Flaviano Malaguti
- Succeeded by: Giuliano Domenicali

Personal details
- Born: 3 December 1930 San Martino, Ferrara, Kingdom of Italy
- Died: 27 April 2020 (aged 89) Ferrara, Italy
- Party: Italian Communist Party
- Occupation: Trade unionist

Radames Costa (3 December 1930 – 27 April 2020) was an Italian politician and trade unionist of the Italian Communist Party. He served as president of the Province of Ferrara from 1967 to 1970, mayor of Ferrara from 1970 to 1980, and as a member of the Legislative Assembly of Emilia-Romagna from 1980 to 1990.

== Life and career ==
Costa was born in San Martino, a village in Ferrara, in 1930. He was the son of partisan Ugo Costa, killed by the fascists in the final days of the Italian liberation war. A public official by profession, Costa held managerial positions within the Italian General Confederation of Labour (CGIL) and the provincial federation of the Italian Communist Party (PCI).

He served as president of the Province of Ferrara from 1967 to 1970, before becoming mayor of Ferrara in 1970. He remained mayor until 1980. From 1980 to 1990, Costa served as a member of the Legislative Assembly of Emilia-Romagna, representing the PCI. During this period, he also served as regional assessor for Tourism and Commerce.

From 1996 to 2006, he was president of the Ferrara provincial section of the National Association of Italian Partisans (ANPI).

Costa died in Ferrara on 27 April 2020, aged 89, following a period of illness.
