= Pier Giorgio Dall'Acqua =

Italian politician

President of the Province of Ferrara
- In office 14 June 1999 – 23 June 2009
- Preceded by: Paolo Siconolfi
- Succeeded by: Marcella Zappaterra

Personal details
- Born: 14 April 1949 (age 77) Mercato Saraceno, Province of Forlì-Cesena, Italy

Pier Giorgio Dall'Acqua (born 14 April 1949) is an Italian politician who served as president of the Province of Ferrara from 1999 to 2009.
