= Soffritti =

Soffritti is a surname. Notable people with the surname include:

- Gastón Soffritti (born 1991), Argentine actor
- Roberto Soffritti (1941–2026), Italian politician
