= Migliaro =

- Frazione
- Location of Migliaro in Italy
- Coordinates: 44°48′N 11°58′E
- Country: Italy
- Region: Emilia-Romagna
- Province: Ferrara (FE)
- Comune: Fiscaglia

Area
  - Total: 22.5 km^{2} (8.7 sq mi)
- Elevation: 1 m (3.3 ft)

Population (Dec. 2004)
  - Total: 2,367
  - Density: 105/km^{2} (272/sq mi)
- Time zone: UTC+1 (CET)
  - Summer (DST): UTC+2 (CEST)
- Postal code: 44020
- Dialing code: 0533

Migliaro is a frazione of the comune (municipality) of Fiscaglia in the Province of Ferrara in the Italian region Emilia-Romagna, located about 60 kilometres (37 mi) northeast of Bologna and about 30 kilometres (19 mi) east of Ferrara. It was a separate comune until 2014.
