= List of presidents of the Province of Ferrara =

President of the Province of Ferrara
- Presidente della Provincia di Ferrara
- Incumbent; Daniele Garuti since 30 September 2024
- Term length: 4 years
- Inaugural holder: Antonio Francesco Trotti
- Formation: 1889

The president of the Province of Ferrara is the head of the provincial government in Ferrara, Emilia-Romagna, Italy. The president oversees the administration of the province, coordinates the activities of the municipalities, and represents the province in regional and national matters.

Since September 2024, the office has been held by Daniele Garuti, a centre-right independent.

== List ==
=== Presidents of the Provincial Deputation (1889–1926) ===
No.	Portrait	Name	Took office	Left office	Party
1		Antonio Francesco Trotti	1889	1890	?
2		Antonio Mangilli	1890	1892	?
(1)		Antonio Francesco Trotti	1892	1896	?
3		Stefano Gatti-Casazza	1896	1908	?
4		Eugenio Righini	1908	1910	?
5		Ercole Padovani	1910	1911	?

=== Presidents of the Provincial Deputation (1945–1952) ===
No.	Portrait	Name	Took office	Left office	Party
1		Ivo Diozzi	1945	16 June 1952	Christian Democracy

=== Presidents of the Province (1952–present) ===
No.	Portrait	Name	Took office	Left office	Party
1		Alfredo Carpeggiani	16 June 1952	1964	Italian Socialist Party
2		Flaviano Malaguti	1965	1967	Italian Socialist Party
3		Radames Costa	1967	1970	Italian Socialist Party
4		Giuliano Domenicali	1970	1975	Italian Socialist Party
5		Ugo Marzola	1975	1980	Italian Socialist Party
5		Ugo Marzola	1980	1985	Italian Socialist Party
6		Carlo Perdomi	31 July 1985	12 July 1990	Italian Socialist Party
7		Francesco Ruvinetti	12 July 1990	24 April 1995	Italian Socialist Party
8		Paolo Siconolfi	24 April 1995	14 June 1999	Italian People's Party
9		Pier Giorgio Dall'Acqua	14 June 1999	14 June 2004	The Daisy; Democratic Party
9		Pier Giorgio Dall'Acqua	14 June 2004	25 June 2009	The Daisy; Democratic Party
10		Marcella Zappaterra	25 June 2009	30 September 2014	Democratic Party
11		Tiziano Tagliani	30 September 2014	31 October 2018	Democratic Party
12		Barbara Paron	31 October 2018	6 October 2020	Democratic Party
–		Nicola Minarelli (acting)	6 October 2020	19 December 2021	Democratic Party
13		Gianni Michele Padovani	19 December 2021	30 September 2024	Italian Socialist Party
14		Daniele Garuti	30 September 2024	Incumbent	Independent (centre-right)

== Sources ==
- "Storia amministrativa dell'ente". Ministero dell'Interno.
- Menichini, Piera (2005). "I presidenti delle Province dall'Unità alla Grande guerra: repertorio analitico". Storia Amministrazione Costituzione (13): 248–249.
