= Nino Cristofori =

Italian politician (1930–2015)

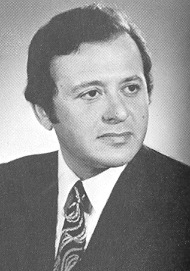

Minister of Labor and Social Security
- In office 28 June 1992 – 29 April 1993
- Prime Minister: Giuliano Amato
- Preceded by: Franco Marini
- Succeeded by: Gino Giugni

Personal details
- Born: 31 July 1930 Ferrara, Italy
- Died: 14 March 2015 (aged 84) Ferrara, Italy
- Party: DC; Italian People's Party
- Spouse: Carla Calessi
- Children: 6

Nino Cristofori (31 July 1930 – 14 March 2015) was an Italian politician. He was a member of the Chamber for seven legislatures, from 1968 to 1993. He held the position of minister of labor and social security in the Amato I Cabinet. He also acted as the undersecretary in the Italian governments for seven times.

== Biography ==
Cristofori was born in Ferrara in 1930. He started his career as a journalist when he became the publisher and editor-in-chief of a newspaper entitled Avvenire Padano. Then he served in different confederations in Ferrera.

Cristofori was first elected to the Chamber of Deputies on 19 May 1968 and served there for five terms. He was Giulio Andreotti's aide and his emissary to Emilia-Romagna. In 1990 Cristofori was the deputy minister of defense. He also served as minister of labor and social security in the cabinet led by Prime Minister Giuliano Amato between 1992 and 1993. On that occasion, he resigned as a deputy in compliance with an internal provision of his party that suggested ministers to free themselves from the parliamentary mandate.

He was a member of the National Council of Christian Democracy and, after its dissolution, of the Italian People's Party, from 1996 to 1999. He subsequently participated in the establishment of European Democracy, which merged in 2002 into the Union of Christian and Centre Democrats, of which he became national councilor.

== Personal life and death ==
Cristofori was married to Carla Calessi with whom he had six children. In addition to the political and journalistic activities he was president of the Italian Boxing League. His daughter, Paola, is married to Tiziano Tagliani who was mayor of Ferrara in 2015.

Cristofori died in Ferrara on 14 March 2015 at 84 years old. His requiem mass was said by Archbishop Luigi Negri of Ferrara.
