= Mario Sarto =

Italian sculptor

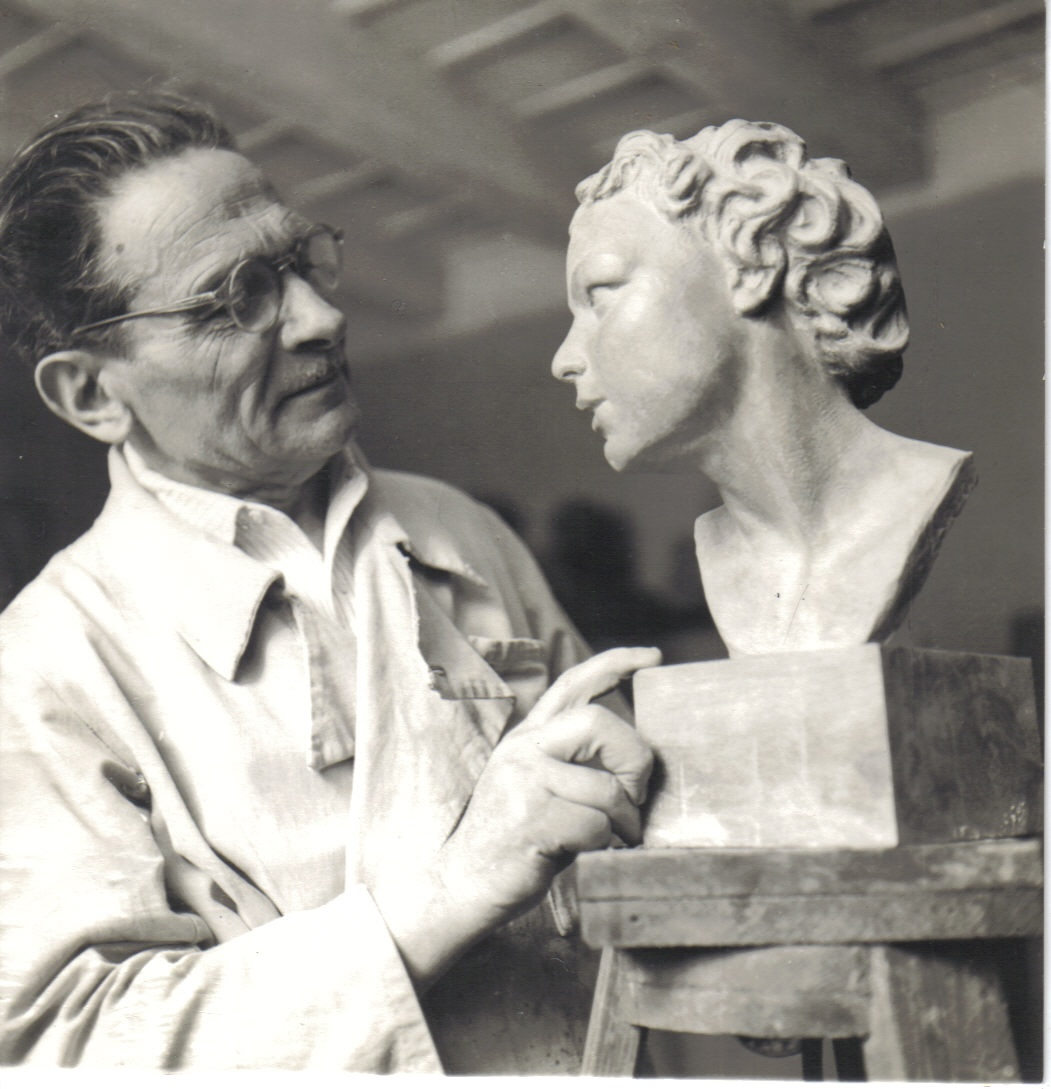
- Sculptor Mario Sarto at work in his studio, with head of angel (1953)
- Born: 13 October 1885; Codigoro, (Ferrara)
- Died: 13 September 1955 (aged 69); Bologna
- Known for: Sculptor
- Movement: Art Nouveau and Liberty

Mario Sarto (13 October 1885 – 13 September 1955) was an important sculptor of religious and commemorative art, renowned for the vast statuary present in the Monumental Cemetery of Bologna.

Many of his statues are also located in the main squares of Italian cities, among which Codigoro, Ferrara, Bologna, with representations of patron saints and heroic figures of the two World Wars.

Grandnephew of Giuseppe Melchiorre Sarto (Saint Pius X), he attended the Academy of Fine Arts of Brera in Milan, then opened his own studio in Bologna, where he lived and worked for the rest of his life.

== Gallery ==
=== Works in the Ferrara Region of Italy, 1920-1930 ===
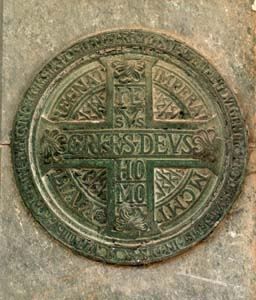
Ancient Christian Cross, Bronze Medallion, Charterhouse of Ferrara, 1928, Ferrara, Italy

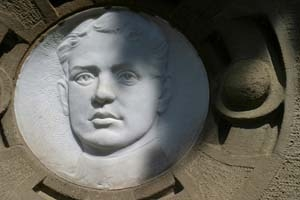
Bas-relief Face, Charterhouse of Ferrara 1929, Ferrara, Italy

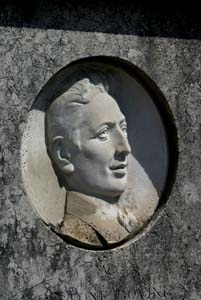
Bas-relief Face, Medallion, Charterhouse of Ferrara 1928, Ferrara, Italy

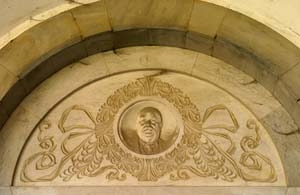
Lunetta with bas-relief medallion, marble work, Charterhouse of Ferrara 1927, Ferrara, Italy

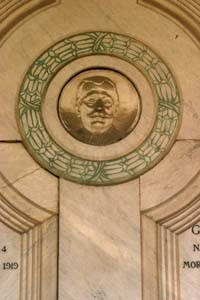
Medallion, sculpture, Charterhouse of Ferrara 1926, Ferrara, Italy

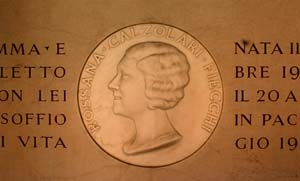
Bas-relief with face, Charterhouse of Ferrara 1929, Ferrara, Italy

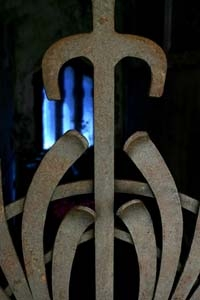
Wrought Iron Sword/Cross, 1930, Ferrara, Italy

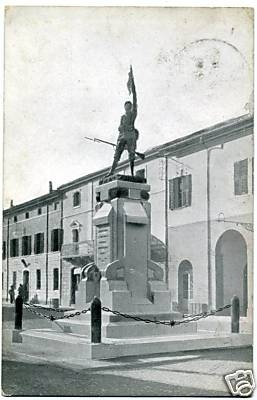
Memorial to WWI Soldier, (Old postcard) 1924, Codigoro, Italy
- For Sarto's sculptures in the Monumental Charterhouse of Bologna, check their external website Certosa di Bologna (in Italian)
