= Tiziano Tagliani =

Italian politician

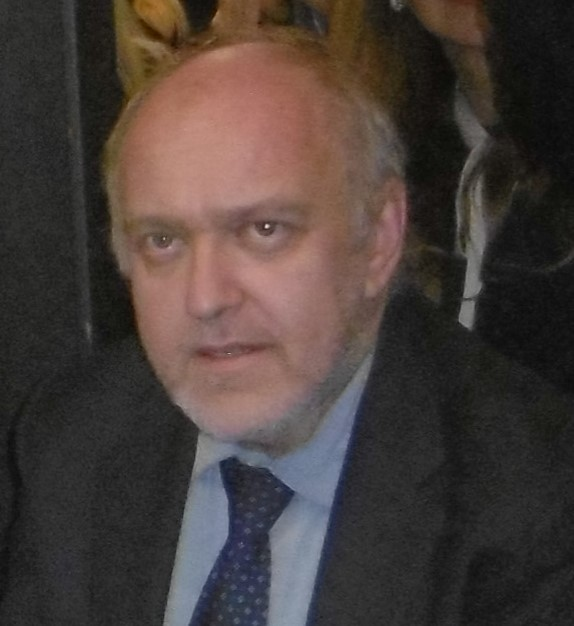

Mayor of Ferrara
- In office 24 June 2009 – 11 June 2019
- Preceded by: Gaetano Sateriale
- Succeeded by: Alan Fabbri

President of the Province of Ferrara
- In office 30 September 2014 – 31 October 2018
- Preceded by: Marcella Zappaterra
- Succeeded by: Barbara Paron

Personal details
- Born: 10 March 1959 (age 67) Ferrara, Italy
- Party: Democratic Party
- Spouse: Paola Cristofori
- Education: University of Ferrara
- Profession: Lawyer

Tiziano Tagliani (born 10 March 1959) is an Italian politician of the Democratic Party.

He was elected mayor of Ferrara on 23 June 2009 and re-elected for a second term on 28 May 2014. He also served as president of the Province of Ferrara from 2014 to 2018.

Tagliani is married to Paola Cristofori, daughter of former minister Nino Cristofori.

== See also ==
- 2009 Italian local elections
- 2014 Italian local elections
- List of mayors of Ferrara

Political offices
| Preceded by Gaetano Sateriale | Mayor of Ferrara; 2009–2019 | Succeeded by Alan Fabbri |
| Preceded by Marcella Zappaterra | President of the Province of Ferrara; 2014-2016 | Succeeded by Barbara Paron |
