= List of mayors of Ferrara =

Mayor of Ferrara
- Sindaco di Ferrara

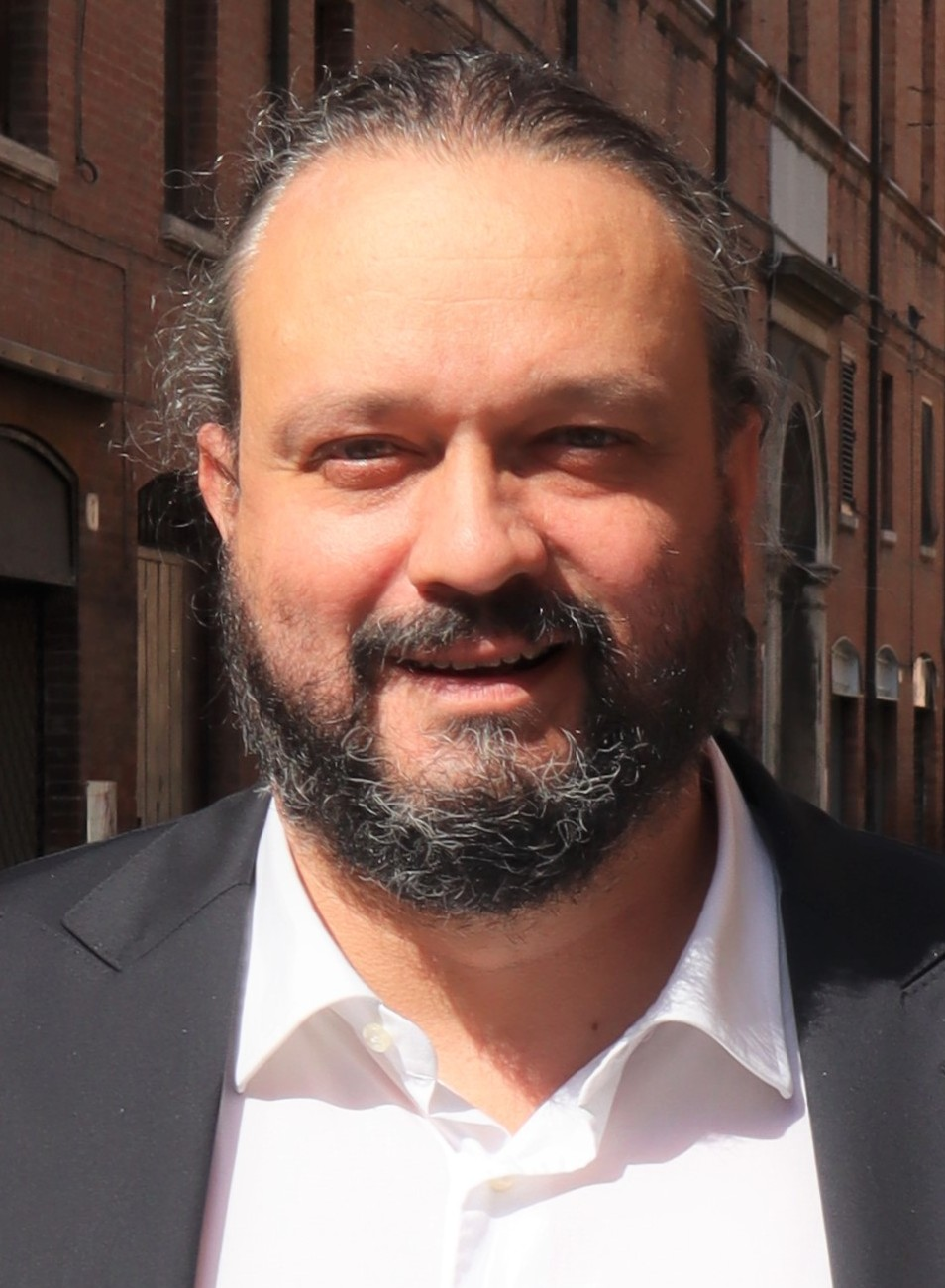
- Incumbent; Alan Fabbri since 11 June 2019
- Appointer: Popular election
- Term length: 5 years, renewable once
- Formation: 1859
- Website: Official website

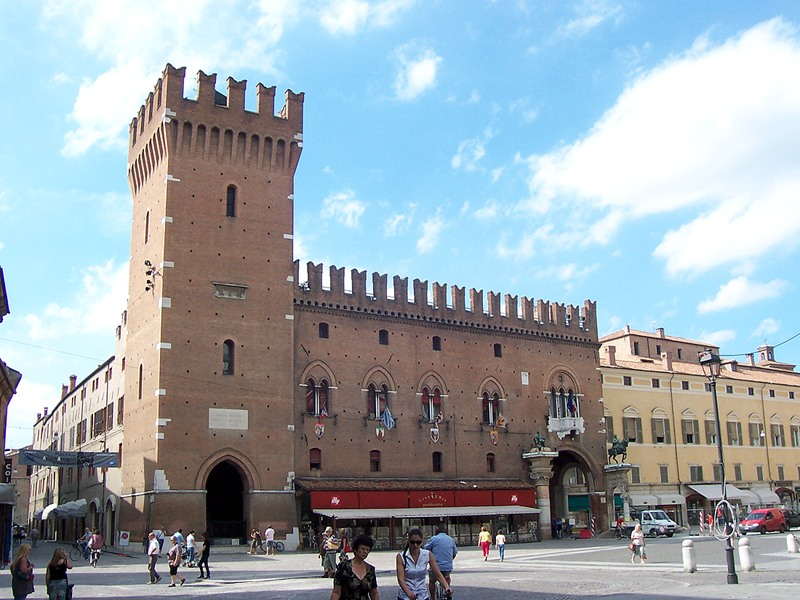
Ferrara's City Hall

The mayor of Ferrara is an elected politician who, along with Ferrara City Council, is accountable for the strategic government of Ferrara in Emilia-Romagna, Italy.

The current mayor is Alan Fabbri, a member of the right-wing populist party Lega Nord, who took office on 11 June 2019.

== Overview ==
According to the Italian Constitution, the mayor of Ferrara is member of the city council.

The mayor is elected by the population of Ferrara, who also elect the members of the city council, controlling the mayor's policy guidelines and is able to enforce his resignation by a motion of no confidence. The mayor is entitled to appoint and release the members of his government.

Since 1995 the mayor is elected directly by Ferrara's electorate: in all mayoral elections in Italy in cities with a population higher than 15,000 the voters express a direct choice for the mayor or an indirect choice voting for the party of the candidate's coalition. If no candidate receives at least 50% of votes, the top two candidates go to a second round after two weeks. The election of the City Council is based on a direct choice for the candidate with a preference vote: the candidate with the majority of the preferences is elected. The number of the seats for each party is determined proportionally.

== Kingdom of Italy (1859-1946) ==
=== Government-appointed mayors (1859-1889) ===
From 1859 to 1889, the mayor of Ferrara was appointed by the King of Italy.

	Mayor	Term Start	Term End
1	Rodolfo Varano	1859	1867
2	Antonio Francesco Trotti	1867	1870
3	Antonio Niccolini (acting)	September 1870	December 1870
4	Rodolfo Varano	1874	1875
5	Antonio Francesco Trotti	1878	1887
6	Cosimo Masi	1887	1888

=== City Council election (1889-1926) ===
From 1889 to 1926, the Mayor of Ferrara was elected by the City Council.

	Mayor	Term Start	Term End	Party
7	Carlo Giustiniani	1889	?	
8	Pietro Niccolini	1897	1902	Historic Right
	Giussepe Rivani	1902	1903	
	Attilio De-Johannis	1903	1903	
	Manfredi Grillenzoni	1903	1904	
	Girolamo Chiozzi	1904	1904	
	Stefano Gatti-Casazza	1904	1905	
	Ettore Magni	1905	1907	
	Pietro Niccolini (acting)	1907	1908	Historic Right
	Ettore Magni	1908	1910	
	Vincenzo Bianchi (acting)	1913	1914	
	Ettore Magni	1914	1919	
	Costantino Cellario	1919	1920	
	Temistocle Bogianckino	1920	1921	PSI
	Alberto Cian (acting)	1921	1922	
	Raoul Caretti	1923	1926	PNF

=== Government-appointed mayors (1926-1945) ===
From 1926 to 1945, the mayor of Ferrara was appointed by the Fascist government of Italy.

Mayor	Term Start	Term End	Party
Renzo Ravenna	1926	1938	PNF
Alberto Verdi	1938	1943	PNF
Marolla Act	1943	1943	PNF
Alberto Verdi	1943	1945	PFR
Eolo Fagioli	1945	1945	PFR

=== Transitional Constitutional Period mayor (1945-1946) ===
Mayor	Term Start	Term End	Party
Michael Tortora	1945	1946	PSI

== Republic of Italy (since 1946) ==
=== City Council election (1946–1995) ===
From 1946 to 1995, the Mayor of Ferrara was elected by the City Council.

	Mayor	Term start	Term end	Party
1	Giovanni Buzzoni (1916–1989)	1946	1948	PCI
2	Werther Curti (1916–1995)	1948	1951	PCI
3	Luisa Gallotti Balboni (1913–1979)	1951	1958	PCI
4	Spero Ghedini (1911–1997)	1958	1964	PCI
5	Giuseppe Ferrari (1920–2001)	1964	1970	PCI
6	Radames Costa (1930–2020)	1970	1980	PCI
7	Claudio Vecchi (1929–2001)	1980	1983	PCI
8	Roberto Soffritti (1941–2026)	1983	1995	PCI

=== Popular election (since 1995) ===
Since 1995, under provisions of new local administration law, the Mayor of Ferrara is chosen by popular election, originally every four and since 1999 every five years.

	Mayor	Term start	Term end	Party	Coalition	Election
(8)	Roberto Soffritti (1941–2026)	8 May 1995	15 June 1999	PDS; DS	The Olive Tree (PDS-PPI-SI-AD)	1995
9	Gaetano Sateriale (b. 1951)	15 June 1999	14 June 2004	DS; PD	The Olive Tree (DS-PPI-PRC-SDI)	1999
9	Gaetano Sateriale (b. 1951)	14 June 2004	24 June 2009	DS; PD	The Olive Tree (DS-DL-PRC-FdV)	2004
10	Tiziano Tagliani (b. 1959)	24 June 2009	28 May 2014	PD	PD • SEL • IdV and leftist lists	2009
10	Tiziano Tagliani (b. 1959)	28 May 2014	11 June 2019	PD	PD • SEL	2014
11	Alan Fabbri (b. 1979)	11 June 2019	11 June 2024	Lega	Lega • FI • FdI	2019
11	Alan Fabbri (b. 1979)	11 June 2024	Incumbent	Lega	Lega • FI • FdI	2024

== See also ==
- Timeline of Ferrara
