= Daniele Garuti =

Italian politician (born 1962)

President of the Province of Ferrara
- Incumbent
- Assumed office 30 September 2024
- Preceded by: Gianni Michele Padovani

Mayor of Poggio Renatico
- Incumbent
- Assumed office 26 May 2014
- Preceded by: Paolo Pavani
- In office 14 June 1999 – 14 June 2004
- Preceded by: Giovanni Malservigi
- Succeeded by: Paolo Pavani

Personal details
- Born: 14 April 1962 (age 64) Ferrara, Italy

Daniele Garuti (born 14 April 1962) is an Italian politician serving as president of the Province of Ferrara since 2024. He has also served as mayor of Poggio Renatico since 2014, having previously held the office from 1999 to 2004.

In September 2024, Garuti was elected president of the Province of Ferrara as the candidate of the centre-right coalition, receiving 52,592 weighted votes.
