= Masi Torello =

- Comune
- Comune di Masi Torello
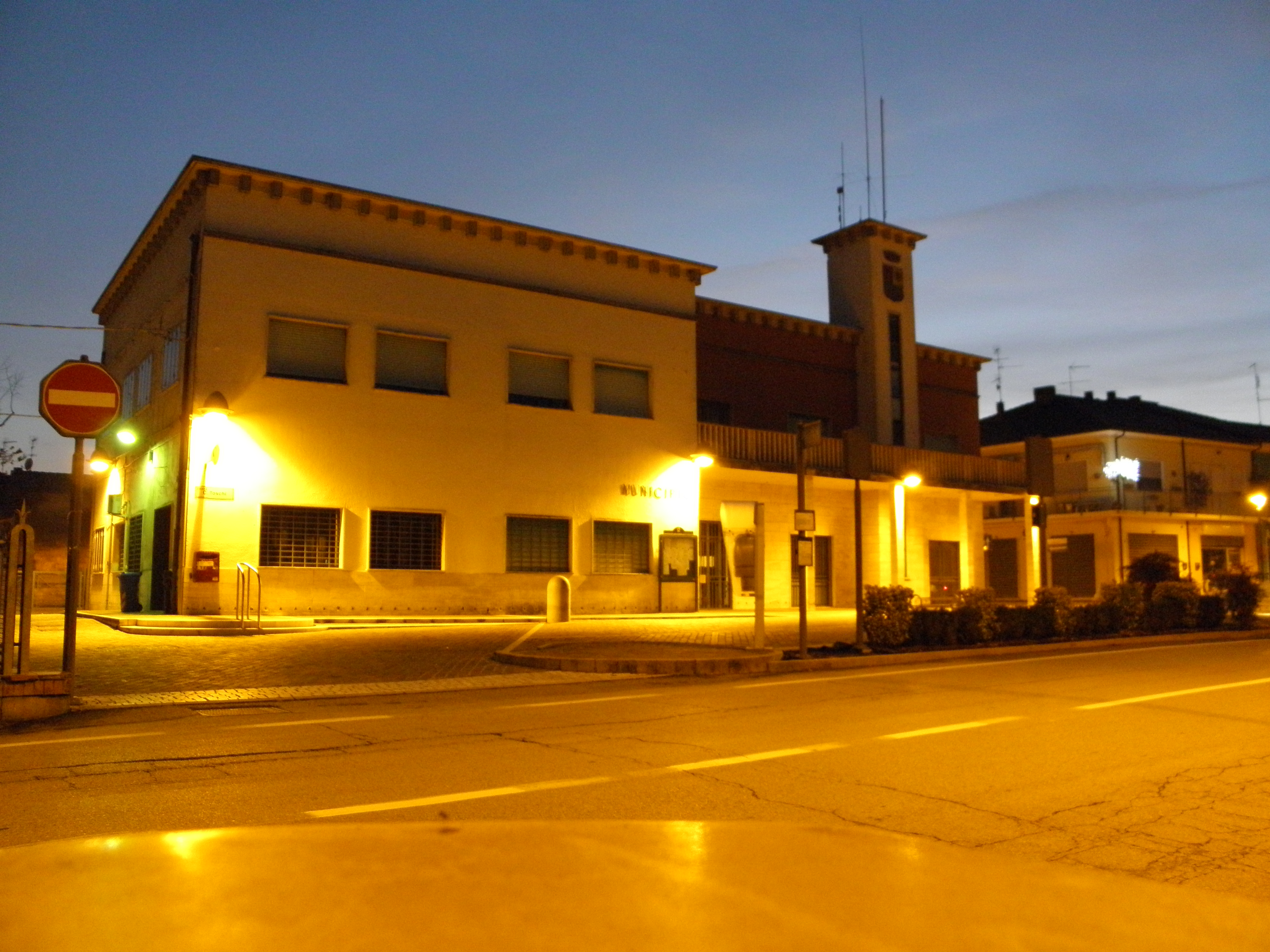
- View of Masi Torello

- Flag Coat of arms

- Location within Italy Location within Emilia-Romagna
- Coordinates: 44°48′N 11°48′E
- Country: Italy
- Region: Emilia-Romagna
- Province: Province of Ferrara (FE)
- Frazioni: Masi San Giacomo

Area
  - Total: 22.9 km^{2} (8.8 sq mi)
- Elevation: 3 m (9.8 ft)

Population (Dec. 2004)
  - Total: 2,355
  - Density: 103/km^{2} (266/sq mi)
- Time zone: UTC+1 (CET)
  - Summer (DST): UTC+2 (CEST)
- Postal code: 44020
- Dialing code: 0532
- Website: Official website

Masi Torello (Ferrarese: Màs Turèl) is a comune (municipality) in the Province of Ferrara in the Italian region Emilia-Romagna, located about 50 kilometres (31 mi) northeast of Bologna and about 15 kilometres (9 mi) east of Ferrara. As of 31 December 2004, it had a population of 2,355 and an area of 22.9 square kilometres (8.8 mi^{2}).

The municipality of Masi Torello contains the frazione (subdivision) Masi San Giacomo.

Masi Torello borders the following municipalities: Ferrara, Ostellato, Portomaggiore, Voghiera.

== Demographic evolution ==
Historical population

Year	Pop.	±%
1861	1,800	—
1871	1,936	+7.6%
1881	2,061	+6.5%
1901	2,413	+17.1%
1911	2,431	+0.7%

Year	Pop.	±%
1921	2,715	+11.7%
1931	2,861	+5.4%
1936	2,951	+3.1%
1951	3,197	+8.3%
1961	2,857	−10.6%

Year	Pop.	±%
1971	2,550	−10.7%
1981	2,451	−3.9%
1991	2,430	−0.9%
2001	2,334	−4.0%

Source: Data from ISTAT
