= Riva del Po =

- Comune
- Comune di Riva del Po
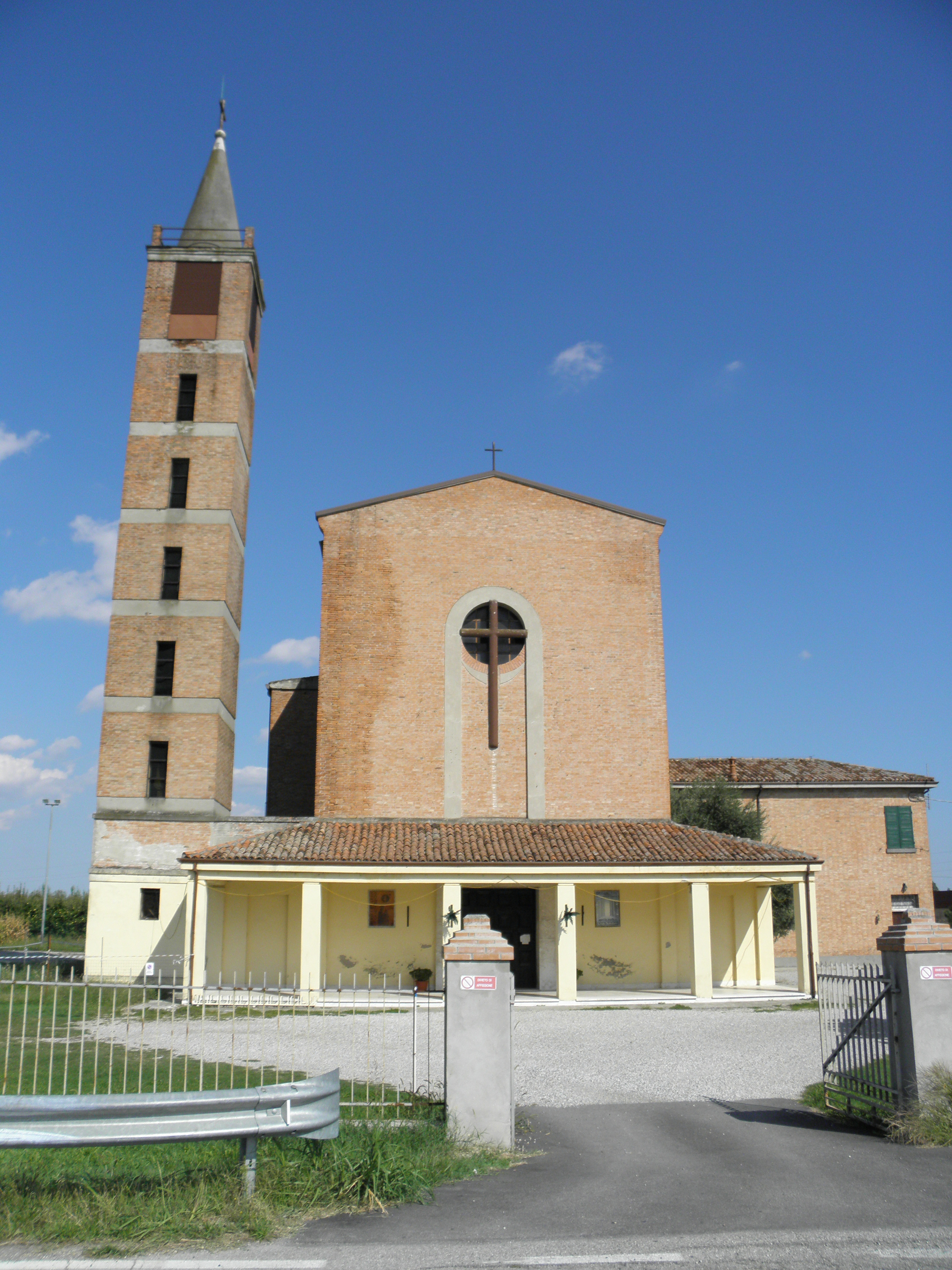
- Church of the Assumption of the Most Blessed Virgin Mary in Riva del Po

- Flag Coat of arms

- Location within Italy Location within Emilia-Romagna
- Coordinates: 44°57′49.77″N 11°54′35.52″E
- Country: Italy
- Region: Emilia-Romagna
- Province: Ferrara (FE)

Government
  - Mayor: Andrea Zamboni

Area
  - Total: 113.2 km^{2} (43.7 sq mi)

Population (30 November 2019)
  - Total: 7,781
  - Density: 68.74/km^{2} (178.0/sq mi)
- Time zone: UTC+1 (CET)
  - Summer (DST): UTC+2 (CEST)
- Postal code: 44033
- Dialing code: 0532

Riva del Po is a comune (municipality) in the Province of Ferrara in the Italian region Emilia-Romagna. It was established on 1 January 2019 with the merger of the municipalities of Berra and Ro.
