= Codigoro =

- Comune
- Comune di Codigoro
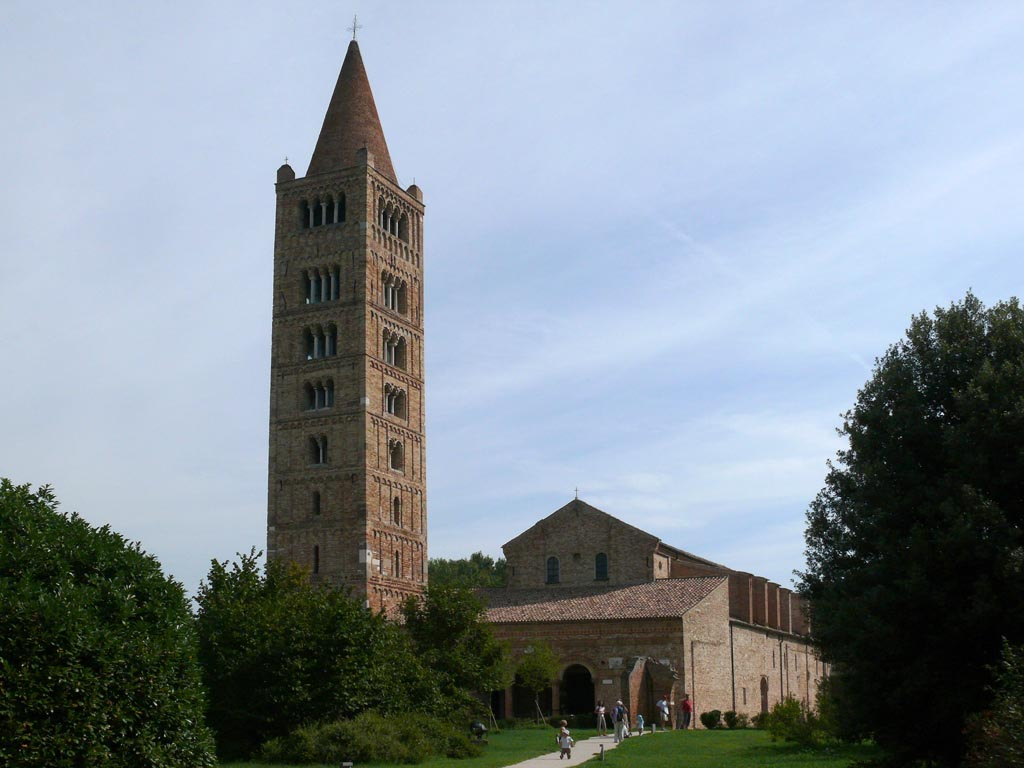
- View of the Pomposa Abbey

- Flag Coat of arms

- Location within Italy Location within Emilia-Romagna
- Coordinates: 44°50′N 12°7′E
- Country: Italy
- Region: Emilia-Romagna
- Province: Ferrara (FE)
- Frazioni: Caprile, Italba, Mezzogoro, Pomposa, Pontelangorino, Pontemaodino, Torbiera, Volano

Government
  - Mayor: Rita Cinti Luciani

Area
  - Total: 169.8 km^{2} (65.6 sq mi)
- Elevation: 4 m (13 ft)

Population (30 April 2008)
  - Total: 12,681
  - Density: 74.68/km^{2} (193.4/sq mi)
- Demonym: Codigoresi
- Time zone: UTC+1 (CET)
  - Summer (DST): UTC+2 (CEST)
- Postal code: 44021
- Dialing code: 0533
- Patron saint: St. Martin
- Saint day: 11 November
- Website: Official website

Codigoro (Ferrarese: Codgòr) is a comune (municipality) in the Province of Ferrara in the Italian region Emilia-Romagna, located about 70 kilometres (43 mi) northeast of Bologna and about 40 kilometres (25 mi) east of Ferrara.

== Main sights ==
- Abbey of Pomposa (9th century)
- Bishop's Palace, restored in Venetian style in 1732
- Finance Tower (18th century)
- Memorial to World War I Soldier, by Codigoro sculptor Mario Sarto
