= Roberto Soffritti =

Italian politician (1941–2026)

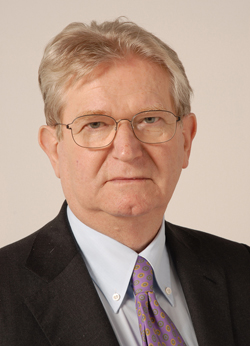
- Soffritti in 2006

Member of the Chamber of Deputies of Italy
- In office 28 April 2006 – 28 April 2008

Mayor of Ferrara
- In office 28 March 1983 – 15 June 1999
- Preceded by: Claudio Vecchi
- Succeeded by: Gaetano Sateriale

Personal details
- Born: 11 October 1941 Ferrara, Kingdom of Italy
- Died: 8 June 2026 (aged 84) Ferrara, Italy
- Party: PCI (till 1991); PDS (1991–1998); DS (1998–2001); PdCI (2001–2015); SEL (2015–2016); PD (2023–2026)
- Education: University of Bologna
- Occupation: Civil servant

Roberto Soffritti (11 October 1941 – 8 June 2026) was an Italian politician. Former Mayor of Ferrara, he served in the Chamber of Deputies from 2006 to 2008.

Soffritti died on 8 June 2026, at the age of 84.
