= Formignana =

- Comune
- Comune di Formignana
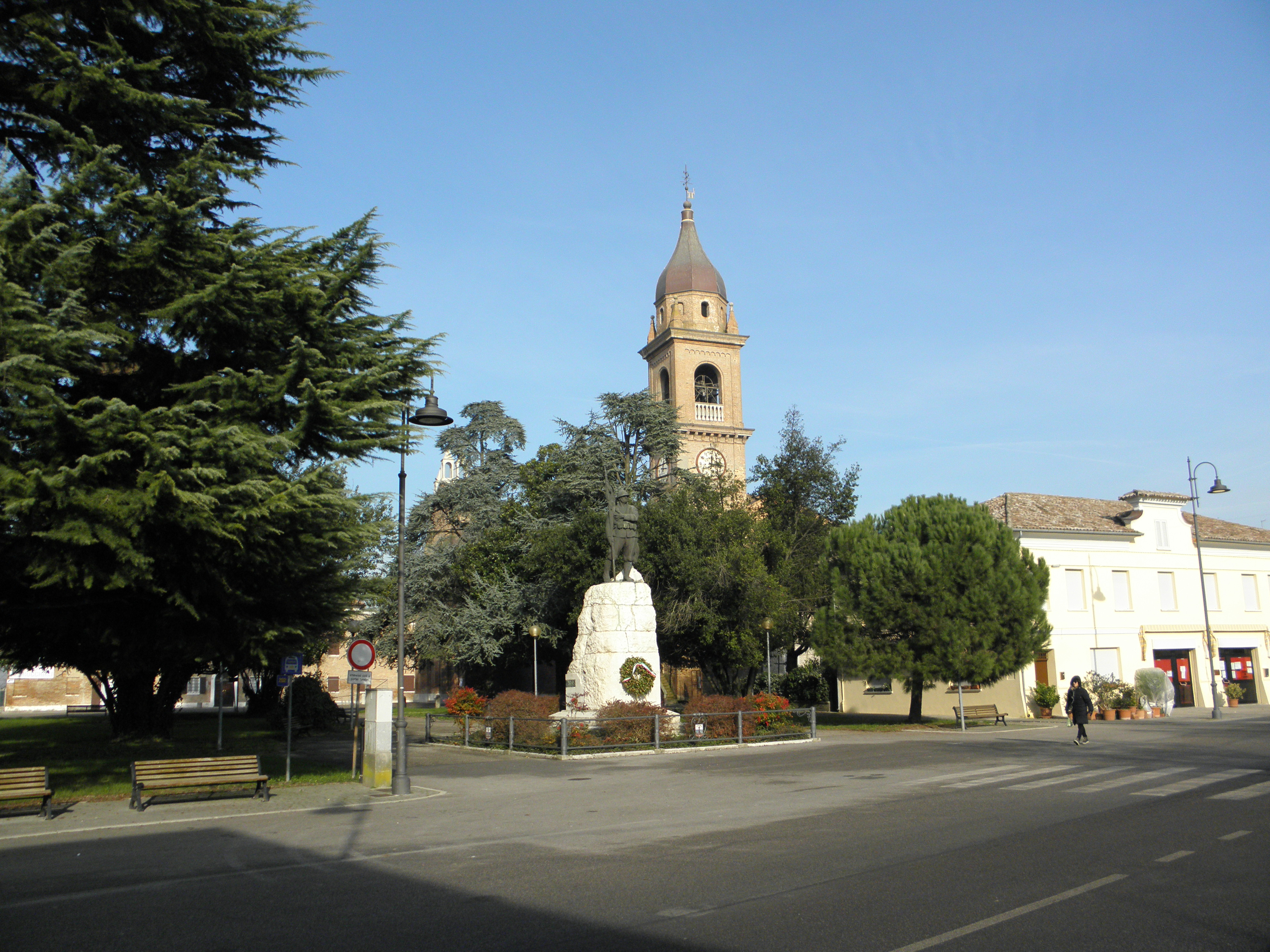
- The central IV Novembre Square with the War Monument and the Saint Stephen church tower

- Location within Italy Location within Emilia-Romagna
- Coordinates: 44°51′N 11°52′E
- Country: Italy
- Region: Emilia-Romagna
- Province: Province of Ferrara (FE)
- Frazioni: Brazzolo

Area
  - Total: 22.3 km^{2} (8.6 sq mi)
- Elevation: 3 m (9.8 ft)

Population (Dec. 2004)
  - Total: 2,898
  - Density: 130/km^{2} (337/sq mi)
- Time zone: UTC+1 (CET)
  - Summer (DST): UTC+2 (CEST)
- Postal code: 44035
- Dialing code: 0533
- Patron saint: Saint Stephen I, Pope and Martyr
- Website: Official website

Formignana (Ferrarese: Furmgnàna) is a comune (municipality) in the Province of Ferrara in the Italian region Emilia-Romagna, located about 60 kilometres (37 mi) northeast of Bologna and about 20 kilometres (12 mi) east of Ferrara. As of 31 December 2004, it had a population of 2,898 and an area of 22.3 square kilometres (8.6 mi^{2}).

Formignana borders the following municipalities: Copparo, Ferrara, Jolanda di Savoia, Tresigallo.

== Demographic evolution ==
Historical population

Year	Pop.	±%
1861	2,013	—
1871	2,190	+8.8%
1881	2,493	+13.8%
1901	2,942	+18.0%
1911	3,299	+12.1%

Year	Pop.	±%
1921	3,551	+7.6%
1931	3,851	+8.4%
1936	3,833	−0.5%
1951	3,745	−2.3%
1961	3,128	−16.5%

Year	Pop.	±%
1971	2,763	−11.7%
1981	2,853	+3.3%
1991	2,906	+1.9%
2001	2,840	−2.3%

Source: Data from ISTAT
