= Chronica parva Ferrariensis =

The Chronica parva Ferrariensis was a short chronicle of the history of Ferrara up to 1264 written by Riccobaldo of Ferrara in the years 1313–17. The chronicler tends to laud the "good old days", and deprecate contemporary Ferrara as fallen away from its former glory, as when he writes of the years before 1240: "At that time the Ferrarese republic was propsering, and its citizens were enjoying wealth and peace." It was included by Ludovico Muratori in his Rerum italicarum Scriptores, and was edited by Gabriele Zanella in 1983.

== Bibliography ==
- A. F. Massèra. "L'autenticità della Chronica parva ferrariensis", Archivio Muratoriano, 10 (n.d.), 551 ff.
- A. Teresa Hankey. Riccobaldo of Ferrara: His Life, Works and Influence (Rome: Istituto storico italiano per il Medio Evo, 1996).
