= Riccobaldo of Ferrara =

Medieval Italian notary and Latin writer

Riccobaldo of Ferrara (c. 1246- after 1320) was a medieval Italian notary and Latin writer of the Middle Ages, a chronicler, geographer and encyclopedist. He is known in the literature as Riccobaldo da Ferrara according to the Italian form, as well as Riccobaldo Ferrarese or as Riccolbaldo.

== Life ==
He was born in the region of present-day Ferrara, circa 1246. His father's name was Bonmercato. On 4 October 1251, he witnessed the Ferrara of Pope Innocent IV; on 17 February 1264, he attended the funeral of Azzo VII d'Este at Ferrara. He appeared as a witness to a statute of Ferrara of 15 December 1274; in May 1282 he was to be found at Faenza; in 1290 he applied his seal to three documents at Reggio Emilia, where he served as notary to the vicar (deputy) of Obizzo II d'Este, the city’s podestà. He is known to have been at Padua in 1293, at Ravenna in 1297-1300, exercising his profession at Ferrara in 1308, once again in Padua at an unspecified period between 1308 and 1313, and at Ferrara in 1310. He died sometime after 1318.

The claims that his real name was Gervasio (Gervase), that he belonged to the Mainardi family, and that he was for a time a canon in Ravenna, are doubtless products of sixteenth and seventeenth-century scholars. One thing that is certain, because he himself says so, is that he bore the titles of dominus ("lord") and magister ("master"). Since Riccobaldo refers to himself as an exile, attempts have been made to see such an exile as a result of Riccobaldo's lending his support to Aldobrandino II in the latter’s clash with his brother Azzo VIII, Lord of Ferrara. However, this hypothesis has to date found no evidence to back it up. That he had no love for the Este family can easily be seen in some of his works, but it is not discernible in others, and so important questions remain unclear. As remarked, Riccobaldo was notary to the vicar (deputy) of Obizzo II d'Este and in Ravenna he appears to have lived in the shadow of Obizzo Sanvitale, Archbishop of Ravenna, a known supporter of the Este family. Yet in 1308 Riccobaldo can be found in Ferrara, swearing fidelity to the Church of Rome immediately after the expulsion of the Este family from the lordship of the city. What should be made of these apparent contradictions?

Riccobaldo witnessed, at times at very close quarters, the political events in his city, and was sometimes a witness, too, of what happened in the history of Italy as a whole, even in works of his that were not strictly historical, but more of a geographical character.

Riccobaldo‘s own cultural story is in part fairly clearly established, even if considerable research is underway. Only recently has it been possible to attribute to him a political "carmen" (song) in Latin which celebrates the newly acquired freedom of his city, Ferrara. In this text, there are obvious citations of various earlier Latin lyrics, a fact that shows a considerable personal culture for the period. While the lyrics passed off in the seventeenth century as Riccobaldo‘s by Girolamo Baruffaldi are certainly not genuine, we still need once more to take into consideration the fact that he had the title of magister ("master") and that phrase of his in his old age where Riccobaldo says he is now dedicated melioribus studiis ("to the better kind of study" or "to better pursuits").

== Riccobaldo's Reading ==
By his own explicit admission, his first impulse to write came from his contact with the archives firstly of Nonantola and then of Ravenna. In Ravenna he came to know, as he himself recounts, the Chronicon, that is to say the Historia Ecclesiastica of Eusebius of Caesarea, in the Chronicon (Chronicle) of Saint Jerome, and in all probability also the so-called Ravenna Cosmography; at Nonantola he certainly had access to the sequel to Jerome’s work, written this time by Saint Prosper of Aquitaine.

Among the numerous works he knew were the dictionary Elementarium doctrinae rudimentum of Papias, the short Chronicon of Saint Isidore of Seville (attributed by Riccobaldo to a bishop Miletus; then some decades of Livy’s ‘’Ab Urbe Condita" (History of Rome); the Historiae adversus paganos (Histories against the Pagans) of Paulus Orosius, the great encyclopedic work by Marziano Capella entitled Itinerarium Antonini, Pliny the Elder’s Naturalis historia (Natural History), the Collectanea rerum memorabilium (Collection of Curiosities) of Solinus, the work of compilation by the Dominican Martin of Opava, which Riccobaldo cites as the Martiniana, parts of the Legenda aurea (Golden Legend) by Jacobus de Voragine, the version of Eutropius drawn up by Paul the Deacon and the Historia Langobardorum (History of the Lombards), the abbreviated version of the Philippic Histories of Gnaeus Pompeius Trogus or Pompey Trogue composed by Justin, Florus, the Pharsalia of Lucan, something of the writings of Seneca the Younger (certainly including the De consolatione ad Helviam and De clementia (On Clemency), Suetonius’s Vitae Caesarum (Lives of the Twelve Caesars), the Navigatio Sancti Brendani (The Sea Voyage of St Brendan), Servius’s commentary on the Aeneid, works of Pomponius Mela, the Pseudo-Turpin Chronicle (Historia Caroli Magni, the Historia scholastica by Peter Comestor (a biblical paraphrase written in Latin), Boethius's De consolatione philosophiae (The Consolation of Philosophy), Juvenal, the Latin translation by Rufinus of Aquileia of Eusebius of Caesarea’s Historia Ecclesiastica, Agnellus of Ravenna.

Subsequently, the list expands considerably in both scope and quality, as Riccobaldo engages with texts attributed to Julius Caesar, particularly the problematic De bello Alexandrino, along with De bello Africo and De bello Hispaniensi (On the Alexandrine War, On the African War, On the Hispanic War). He also consulted Cicero’s Laelius de amicitia (Laelius on Friendship) and Rhetorica ad Herennium (Rhetoric for Herennius), among other works. Additional sources include the Distichs of Cato (Catonis Disticha), Einhard, Hegesippus, Horace, certain texts preserved in the Spicilegium Ravennatis historiae, Virgil, the Dominican Vincent of Beauvais, and manuscripts from the Abbey of Santa Giustina in Padua.

For this very considerable widening of his learning, Riccobaldo certainly owed a great deal to his mixing in the circles of the pre-humanists of Padua, from whom he learned much, but to whom he probably also gave not a little. In any case, there is no overlooking Riccobaldo nowadays as a figure of first rank in the history of Italian culture, despite his having been neglected even in relatively recent times by historians who were otherwise not without merit.

Other works by Riccobaldo, apart from those listed below, are his geographical compilations, one of which, the De locis orbis, was published for the first time only in 1986, while the other, De origine urbium Italie, had, in 2013, still not been published. There are two minor treatises witnessed to by the manuscripts in Vatican City, Biblioteca Apostolica Vaticana, Ottob. Iat. 2072, cc. 45-58 e Parma, Biblioteca Palatina, Parm. 331, cc. 45-67 (for the first); and Venice, Biblioteca. Nazionale Marciana, Lat. X, 169 (3847), cc. 2-31 (for the second). While neither can be dated with any precision, the first of these works if fully of his marure period, and the second from his last years.

== Scholarly Editions of his Works ==
- Riccobaldo da Ferrara, Chronica parva Ferrariensis, Introduzione, edizione e note di Gabriele Zanella, Ferrara 1983 (Deputazione provinciale ferrarese di storia patria, serie Monumenti, IX)
- Ricobaldi Ferrariensis, Compendium Romanae Historiae, cur. A.T. Hankey (FSI 108), Roma 1984
- Riccobaldo da Ferrara, De locis orbis, Introduzione, edizione e note di Gabriele Zanella, Ferrara 1986 (Deputazione provinciale ferrarese di storia patria, serie Monumenti, X), Libro I, Libro II
- Ricobaldi Ferrariensis, Compilatio chronologica, a cura di A. T. Hankey, Roma 2000 (Istituto storico italiano per il Medio Evo, R. I. S. 3, 4)
