= Pomposa Abbey =

Monastery in Codigoro, Italy

Coordinates: 44°49′56″N 12°10′31″E

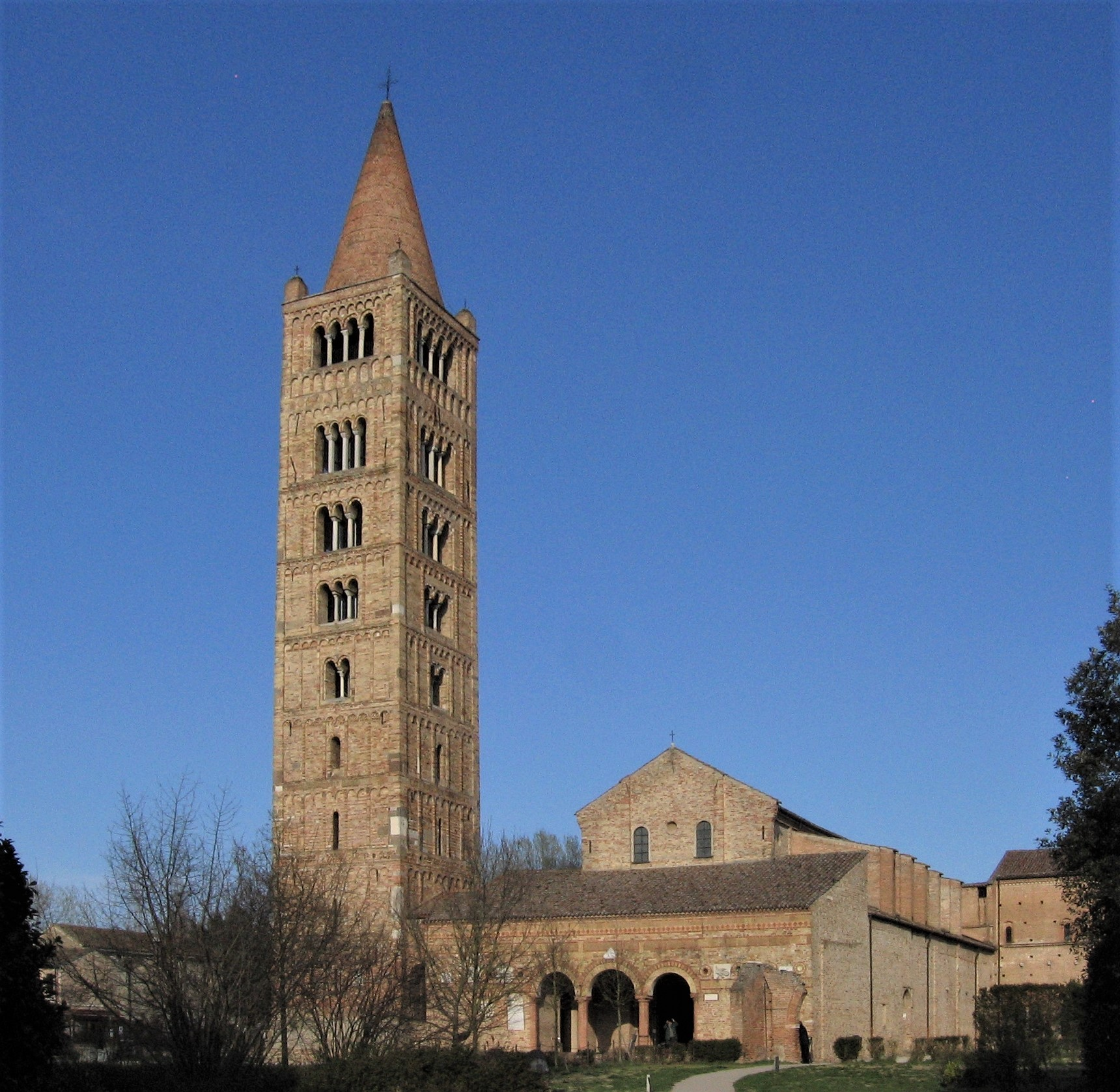
Pomposa Abbey

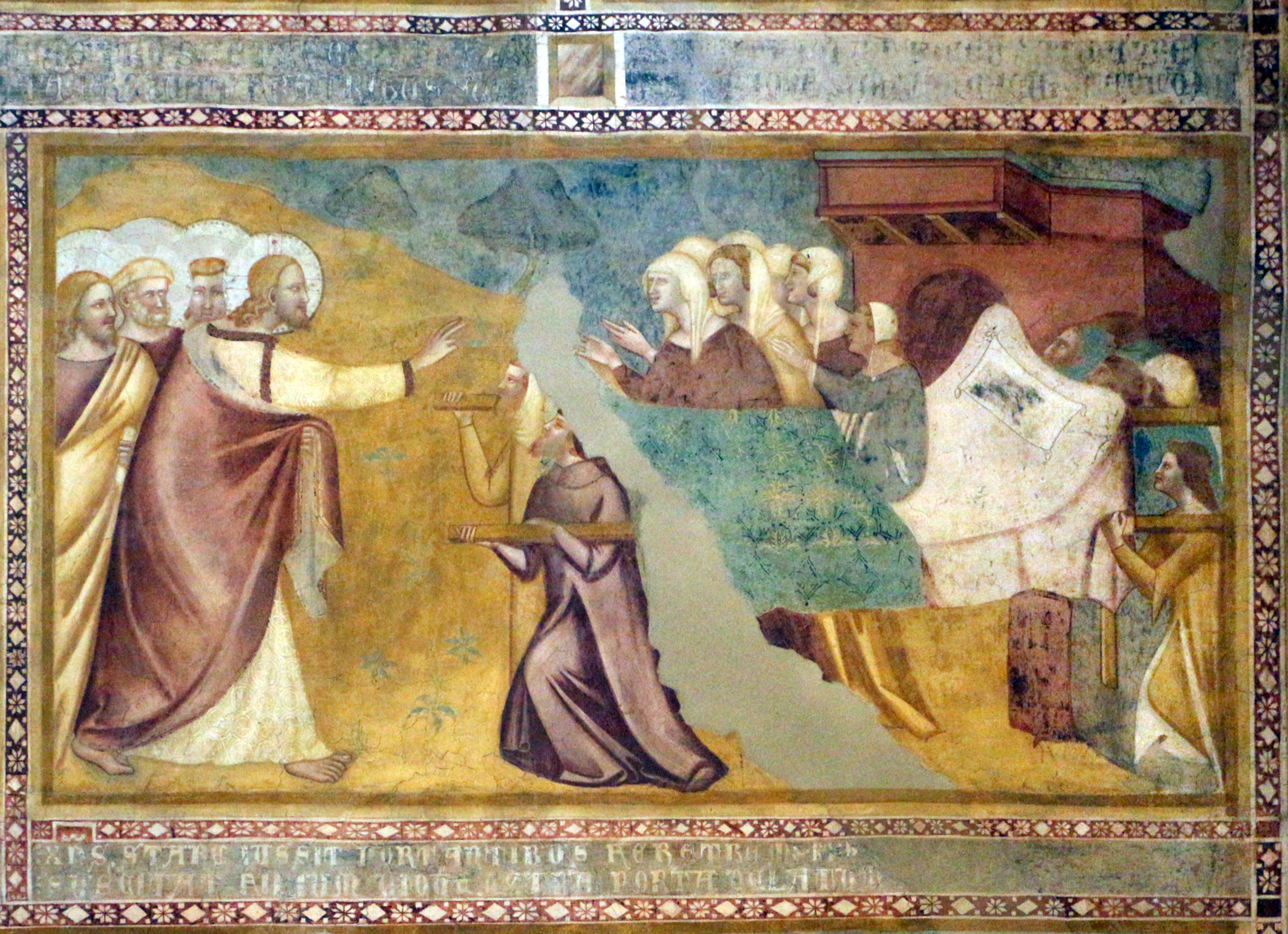
Fresco of the resurrection of the son of the widow of Nain

Pomposa Abbey is a Benedictine monastery in the comune of Codigoro on the Adriatic coast near Ferrara, Italy. It was one of the most important monasteries in the northern Italy and is famous for the Carolingian manuscripts preserved in its rich library, one of the wealthiest of Carolingian repositories, and for the Romanesque buildings.

== History ==
The earliest report of a Benedictine abbey at this site dates from 874, by which time Pomposa was already a center of sophisticated Carolingian art The settlement was probably founded two centuries earlier, following the devastation of Classe, the port of Ravenna (574). It was established during the Lombard epoch of northern Italy by monks of the Irish missionary, Columbanus. A letter of c. 1093 mentions classical texts acquired or copied for the library by the abbot Girolamo alludes to Horace (Carmen Saeculare, Satires, Epistles), Virgil's Georgics, Juvenal, Persius, Quintilian, Terence's Andria, Jerome's preface to the history of Eusebius, Cicero's De officiis and De oratore, the abridgement of Livy called Periochae and the Mathematica of Julius Firmicus Maternus.

Until the 14th century the abbey had possessions in the whole of Italy, making its cartulary significant beyond local level. However, it later declined due to impoverishment of the neighbouring area due to the retreat of the sea front and the increasing presence of malaria of the lower Po Valley. It played an important role in the culture of Italy thanks to the work of its scribe monks and in part to the sojourn at Pomposa of Peter Damian. In this abbey Guido d'Arezzo invented the modern musical notation in the early 11th century.

The monks of Pomposa migrated to San Benedetto, Ferrara, 1650, leaving the abbey unoccupied. In the 19th century the abbey was acquired by the Italian government.

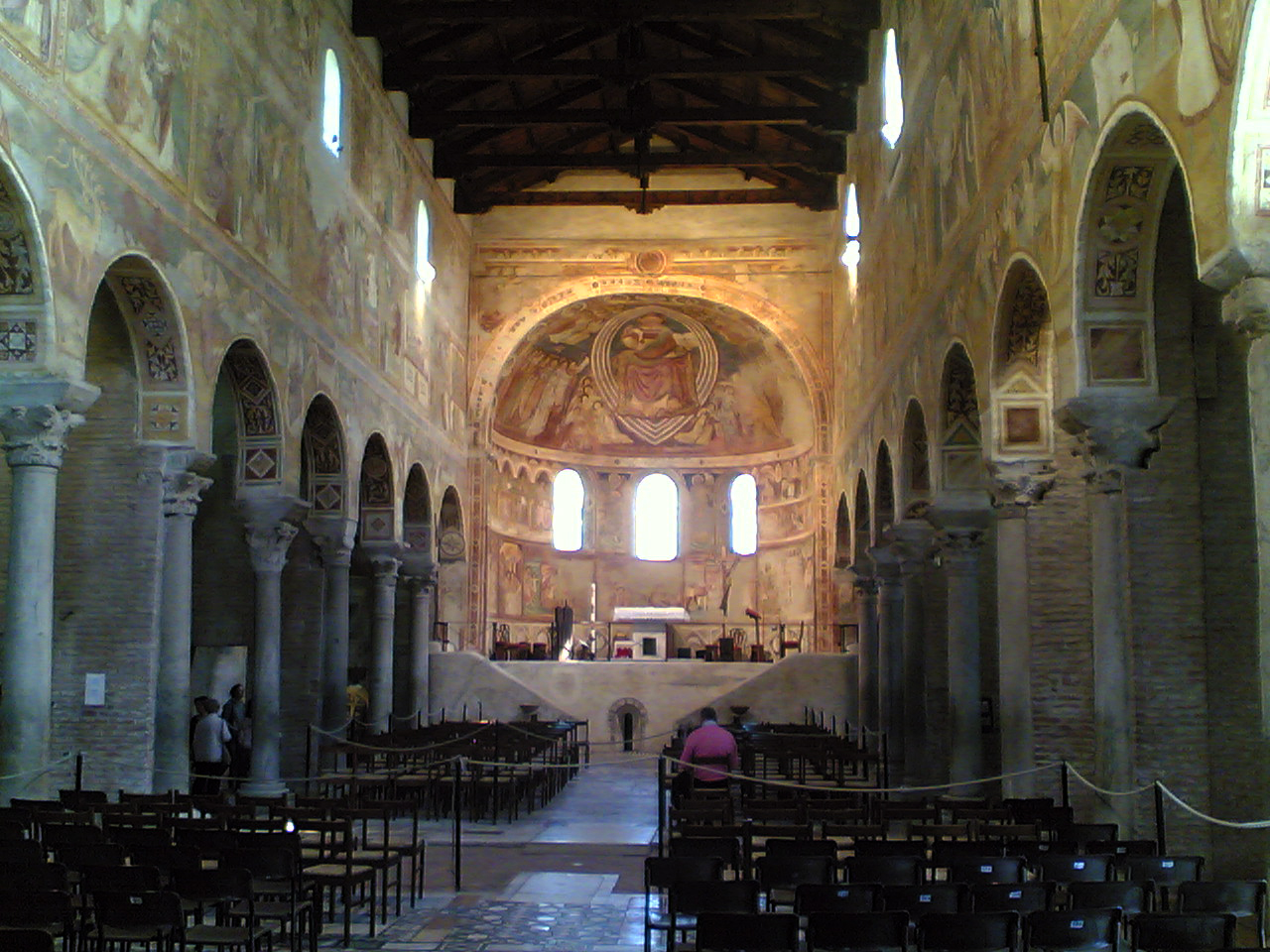
Frescoed nave of the abbey church

The church of Santa Maria is a triple-nave Ravennan Romanesque-style basilica with arcaded aisles and carpentry rafters. It originated in the 7th-9th century, and sequentially enlarged as the abbey grew in power and prestige. The church attained its present aspect, with a segmental apse, in the 11th century. The interior contains a 12th-century Cosmatesque and mosaic inlaid stone pavement along with frescoes in the apse by Vitale da Bologna and his assistants; There are paintings in the refectory by a Riminese master. The chapter hall has early 14th-century frescoes by a pupil of Giotto.

The free-standing campanile (begun in 1063 and completed within several decades), standing at 48 m, is one of the finest surviving belltowers from the Romanesque period, together with the campanile of Abbey of San Mercuriale (75 m), in Forlì.

Notable also is the mid-11th century Palazzo della Ragione facing the abbey church in the forecourt or atrium. It was built before the abbey church was consecrated in 1026, by an architect trained at Ravenna, Mazulo.

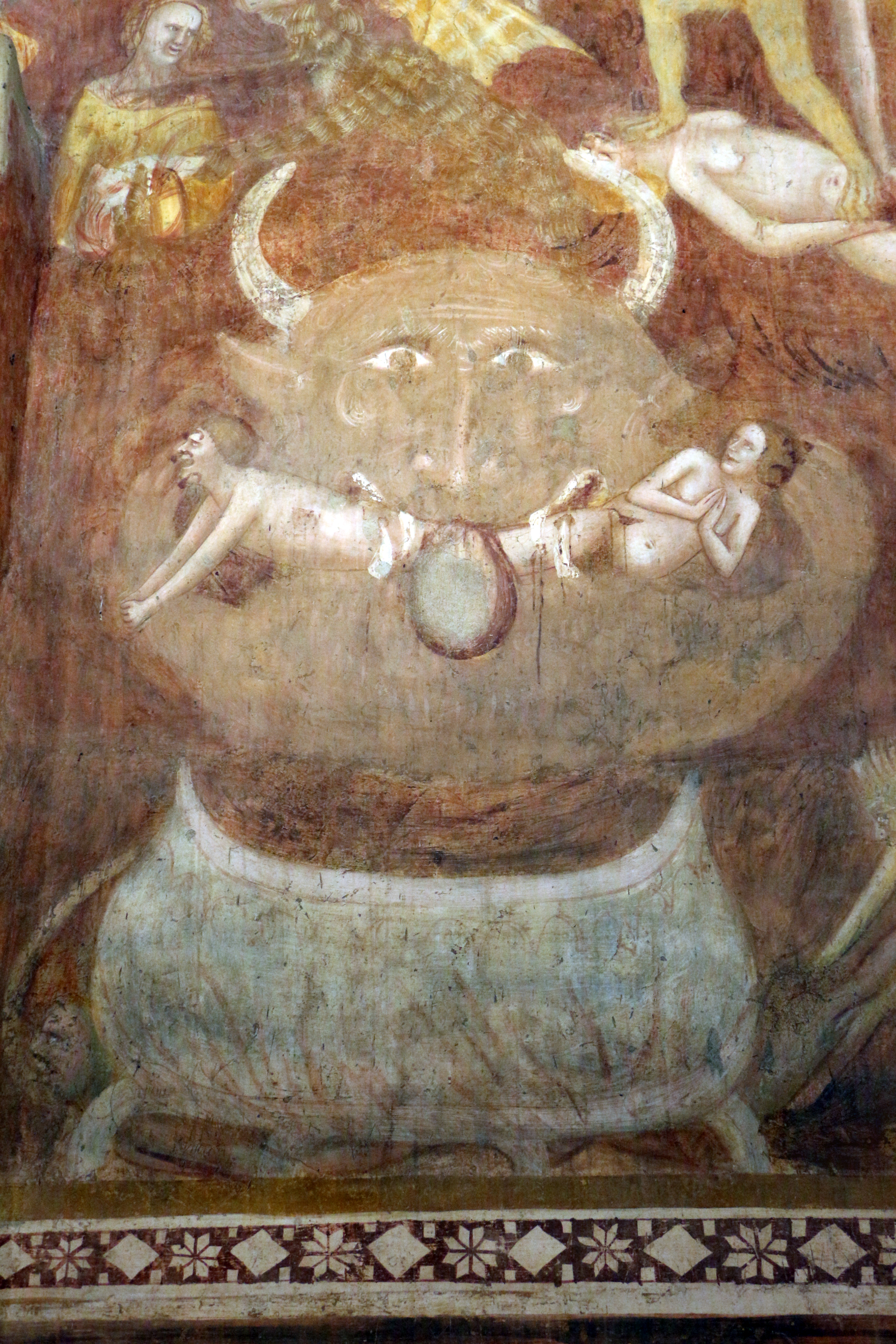
Satan depicted in the Last Judgment fresco.

== In popular culture ==
The abbey gained moderate popularity among Russian Internet users in the early 2010s, thanks to its fresco depicting a devil whose appearance is reminiscent of that of Russian president Vladimir Putin.

After the Russian invasion of Ukraine, the meme had a brief resurgence.
