= Alan Fabbri =

Italian politician (born 1979)

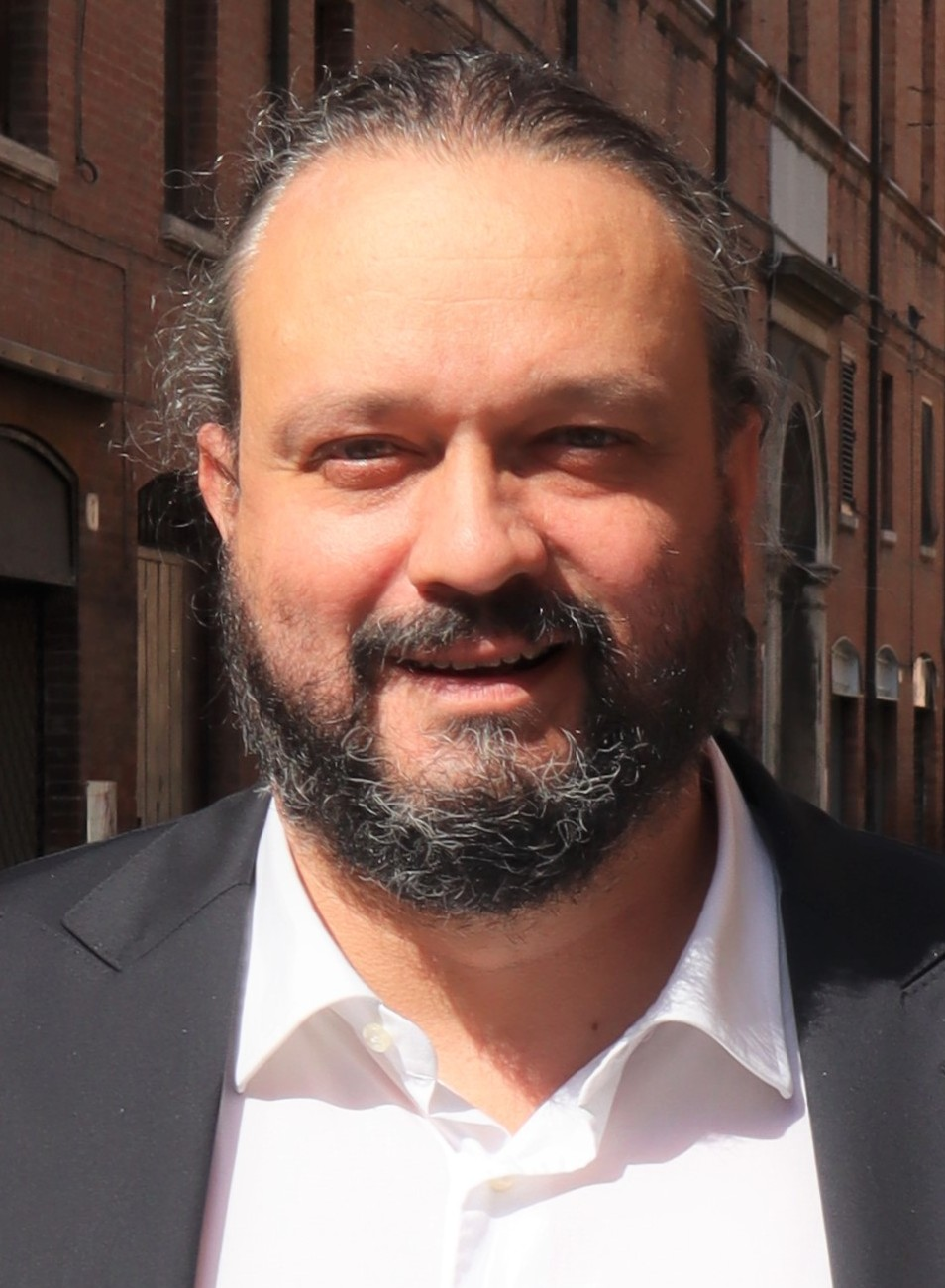

Mayor of Ferrara
- Incumbent
- Assumed office 11 June 2019
- Preceded by: Tiziano Tagliani

Personal details
- Born: 4 January 1979 (age 47) Bondeno, Emilia-Romagna, Italy
- Party: Lega Nord
- Profession: engineer

Alan Fabbri (born 4 January 1979) is an Italian politician. A member of the right-wing party Lega Nord, he served as mayor of Bondeno from 2009 to 2015. He was elected Mayor of Ferrara at the 2019 local elections and took office on 11 June 2019.

He is the first centre-right mayor of the city since the end of World War II.

== Biography ==
Son of farmers from Burana (a hamlet of Bondeno), his father was a Christian Democrat and his mother a Communism, who later joined the Northern League to follow their son's choices.

In 1998, he graduated from the “A. Roiti” Liceo scientifico high school in Ferrara with a grade of 50/60, while in 2005 he obtained a master's degree in materials engineering from the University of Ferrara, followed the following year by his qualification to practice as an engineer.

He is passionate about electric bass and is a fan of Pearl Jam and grunge music.

Political offices
Preceded by Tiziano Tagliani	Mayor of Ferrara since 2019	Succeeded by
