= Vasino, Kichmengsko-Gorodetsky District, Vologda Oblast =

Vasino Васино
- Village
- Location within Vologda Oblast Location within Russia
- Coordinates: 59°52′N 46°38′E
- Country: Russia
- Region: Vologda Oblast
- District: Kichmengsko-Gorodetsky District
- Time zone: UTC+3:00

Vasino (Russian: Васино) is a rural locality (a village) in Yenangskoye Rural Settlement, Kichmengsko-Gorodetsky District, Vologda Oblast, Russia. The population was 8 as of 2002.

== Geography ==
Vasino is located 76 km southeast of Kichmengsky Gorodok (the district's administrative center by road. Verkhnyaya Yentala is the nearest rural locality.
