= Fiscaglia =

- Comune
- Comune di Fiscaglia
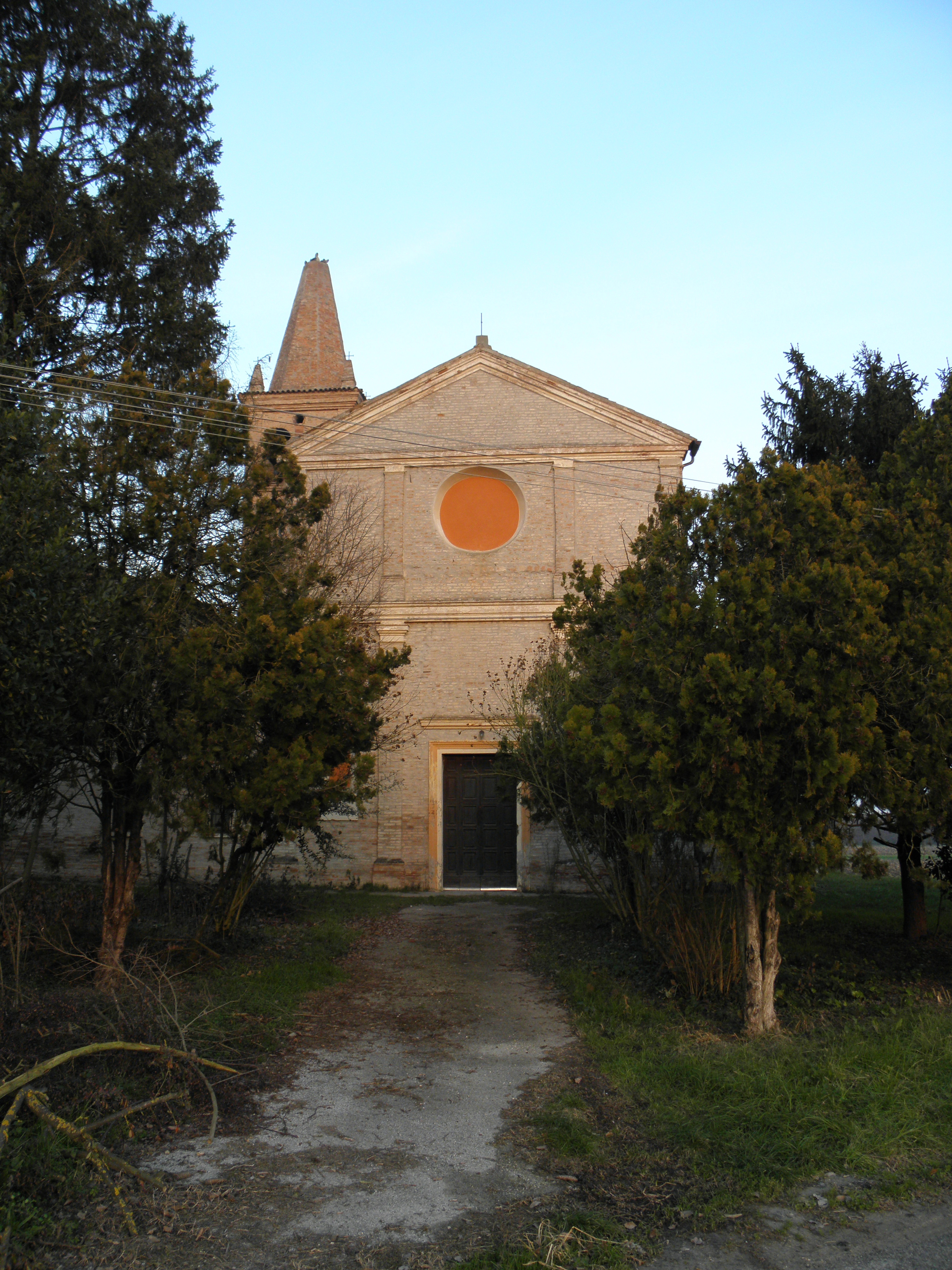
- Church of San Vitale in Fiscaglia

- Coat of arms

- Location within Italy Location within Emilia-Romagna
- Coordinates: 44°16′15″N 11°56′05″E
- Country: Italy
- Region: Emilia-Romagna
- Province: Ferrara (FE)
- Frazioni: Bassa Cornacervina, Massa Fiscaglia, Migliarino, Migliaro, Tieni

Government
  - Mayor: Fabio Tosi

Area
  - Total: 116.18 km^{2} (44.86 sq mi)
- Elevation: 3 m (9.8 ft)

Population (31 may 2025)
  - Total: 8,488
  - Density: 73.06/km^{2} (189.2/sq mi)
- Demonym: Fiscagliesi
- Time zone: UTC+1 (CET)
  - Summer (DST): UTC+2 (CEST)
- Postal code: 44020 (Migliaro); 44025 (Massa Fiscaglia); 44027 (Migliarino)
- Dialing code: 0533
- Website: Official website

Fiscaglia (Ferrarese: Fiscàja) is a comune (municipality) in the Province of Ferrara in the Italian region Emilia-Romagna, located about 60 kilometres (37 mi) northeast of Bologna and about 30 kilometres (19 mi) east of Ferrara. It was founded on 1 January 2014 from the former municipalities of Massa Fiscaglia, Migliarino and Migliaro.
