= Province of Ferrara =

Province of Italy, located in the Emilia-Romagna region

Coordinates: 44°50′42″N 11°37′58″E

Province of Ferrara Provincia di Ferrara (Italian) Pruvîncia ad Fràra (Emilian)
- Province
- Estense Castle, the provincial seat

- Flag Coat of arms

- Location of the province of Ferrara in Italy
- Country: Italy
- Region: Emilia-Romagna
- Capital(s): Ferrara
- Municipalities: 21

Government
  - President: Daniele Garuti

Area
  - Total: 2,635.12 km^{2} (1,017.43 sq mi)

Population (2026)
  - Total: 340,482
  - Density: 129.209/km^{2} (334.651/sq mi)

GDP
  - Total: €9.016 billion (2015)
  - Per capita: €25,559 (2015)
- Time zone: UTC+1 (CET)
  - Summer (DST): UTC+2 (CEST)
- Postal code: 44000-44124
- Telephone prefix: 0532, 0533
- Vehicle registration: FE
- ISTAT: 038

The province of Ferrara (Italian: provincia di Ferrara; Emilian: pruvîncia ad Fràra) is a province in the region of Emilia-Romagna in Italy. Its capital is the city of Ferrara. It has a population of 340,482 in an area of 2,635.12 square kilometres (1,017.43 sq mi) across its 21 municipalities.

== History ==
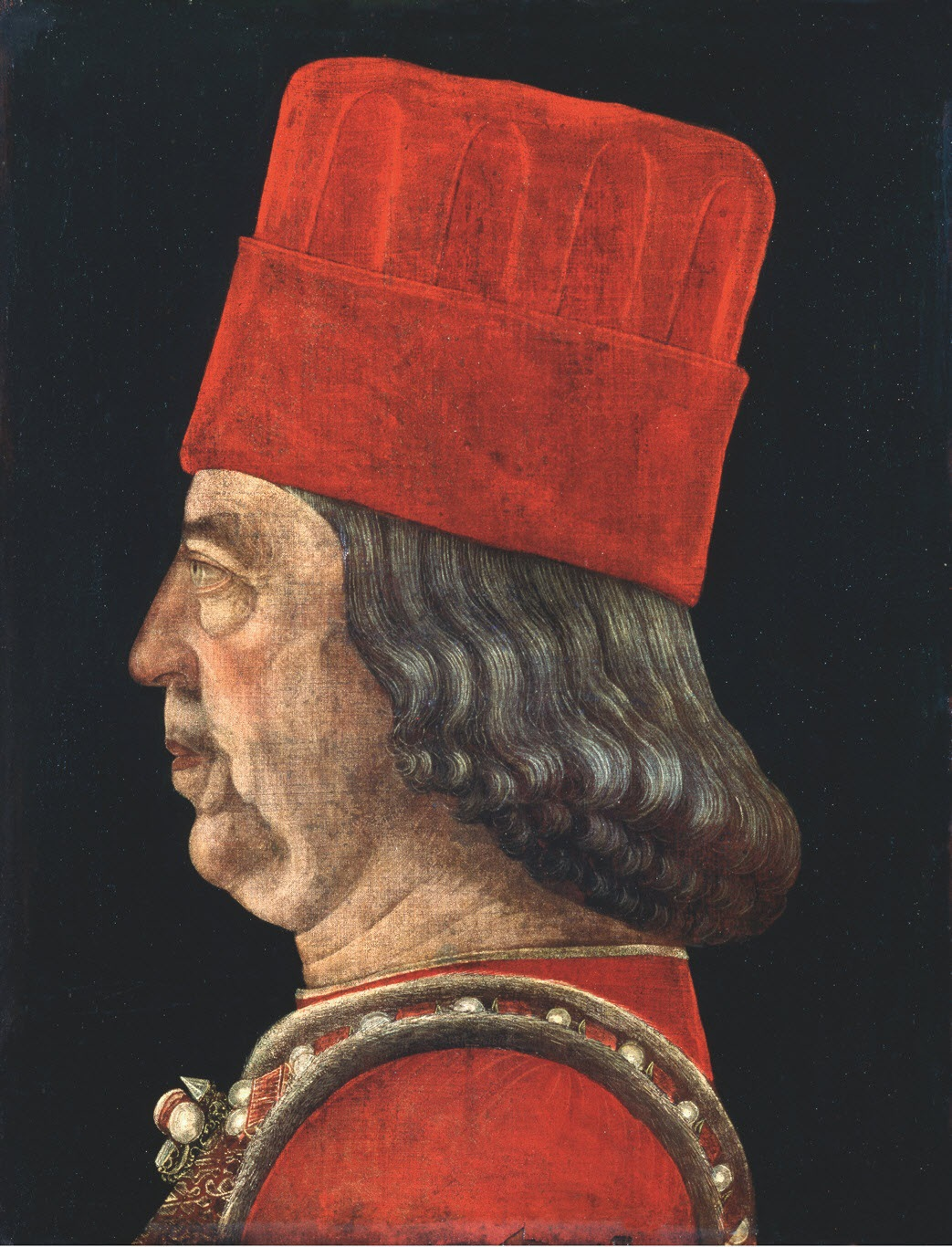
Borso d'Este, the first Duke of Ferrara, Modena and Reggio

The province of Ferrara is believed to have been first settled in by the Romans at the site "Forum Alieni", although remains of the coastal port of Spina have been unearthed near Comacchio by archaeologists. Ferrara was first mentioned when it was conquered by Germanic tribe the Lombards in 753 CE, and the Byzantine Empire lost its rule over the city. It was gifted to the Holy See by the Franks in either 754 or 756 CE, and was led by the Bishops of Ravenna. Benedictine and Cistercian monasteries started reclaiming Podeltan lands in the 9th century.

In 1055, the partially independent town of Fererra was given imperial powers, but was led by Matilda of Tuscany from 1101 and Frederick I, Holy Roman Emperor from 1158. Members of the House of Este took control of the city during the 13th century, and formed a university in Ferrara in 1391. Walls were built around the perimeter of Ferrara in the 15th and 16th centuries. It joined the Papal States in 1598. Its citadel was occupied by the Austrians in 1831 after the Italian United Provinces were formed, and the Austrians occupied the city in 1847. On 21 June 1859 the Austrians left the city of Ferrara and it was able to join the Kingdom of Italy.

In 1921, Italo Balbo joined the newly created National Fascist Party and soon became a secretary of the Ferrara fascist organization. He began to organize Fascist gangs and formed his own group. They broke strikes for local landowners and attacked communists and socialists in the region. His success in Ferrara set in motion the rapid rise of Fascism in northern Italy and played an important role in the transformation of Fascism into a major political movement.

== Geography ==
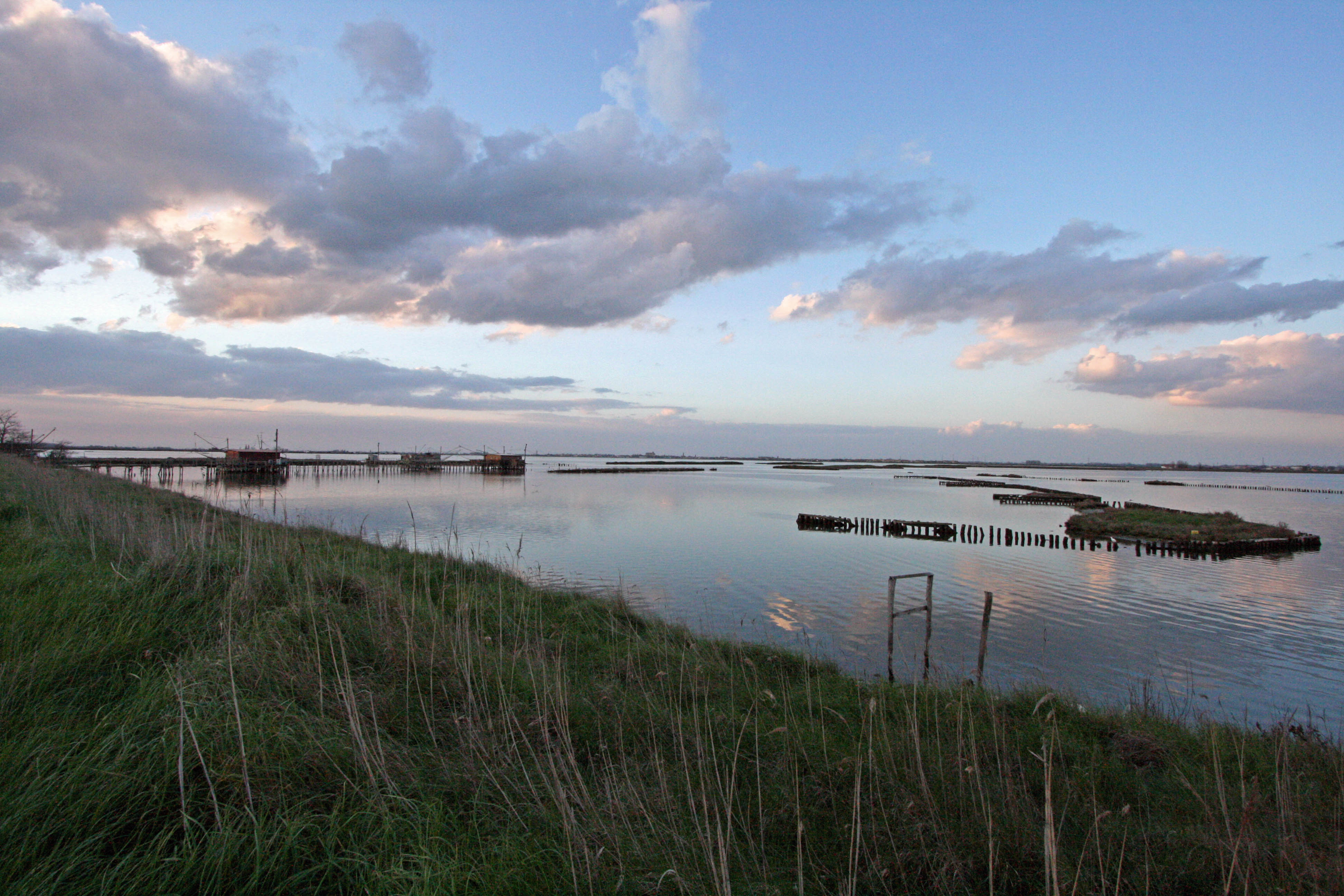
Valli di Comacchio

The province of Ferrara is one of nine provinces in the region of Emilia-Romagna in the northeast of Italy. It is the most northerly province in the region to abut onto the Adriatic Sea. The Province of Rovigo in the Veneto region lies immediately to the north and the Province of Mantua in Lombardy to the northwest. To the west lies the Province of Modena and the Province of Bologna, and the Province of Ravenna lies to the south. The provincial capital is the city of Ferrara, which is situated on a branch of the Po River about 50 km (31 mi) northeast of Bologna.

=== Municipalities ===
Map of the province of Ferrara

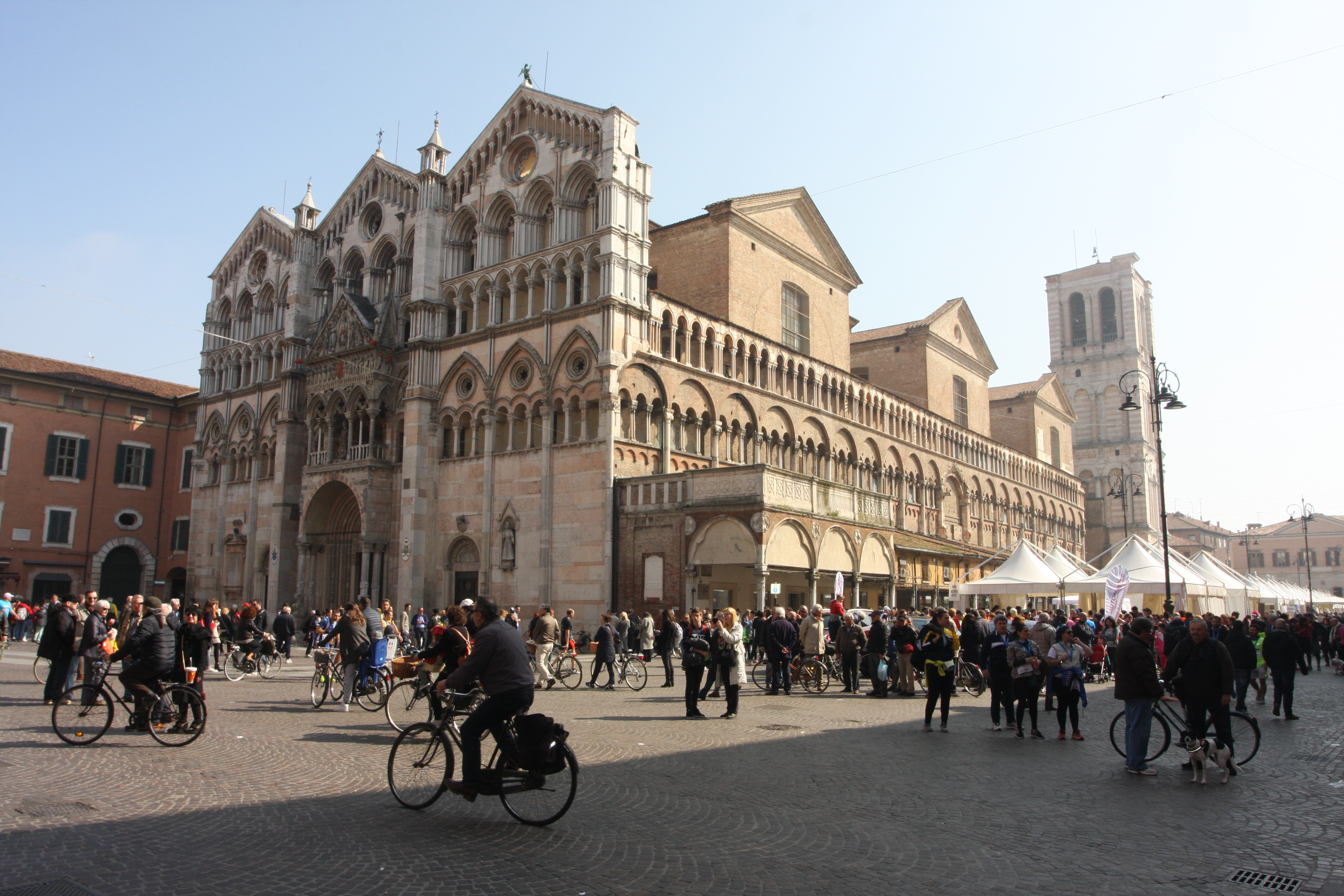
Ferrara

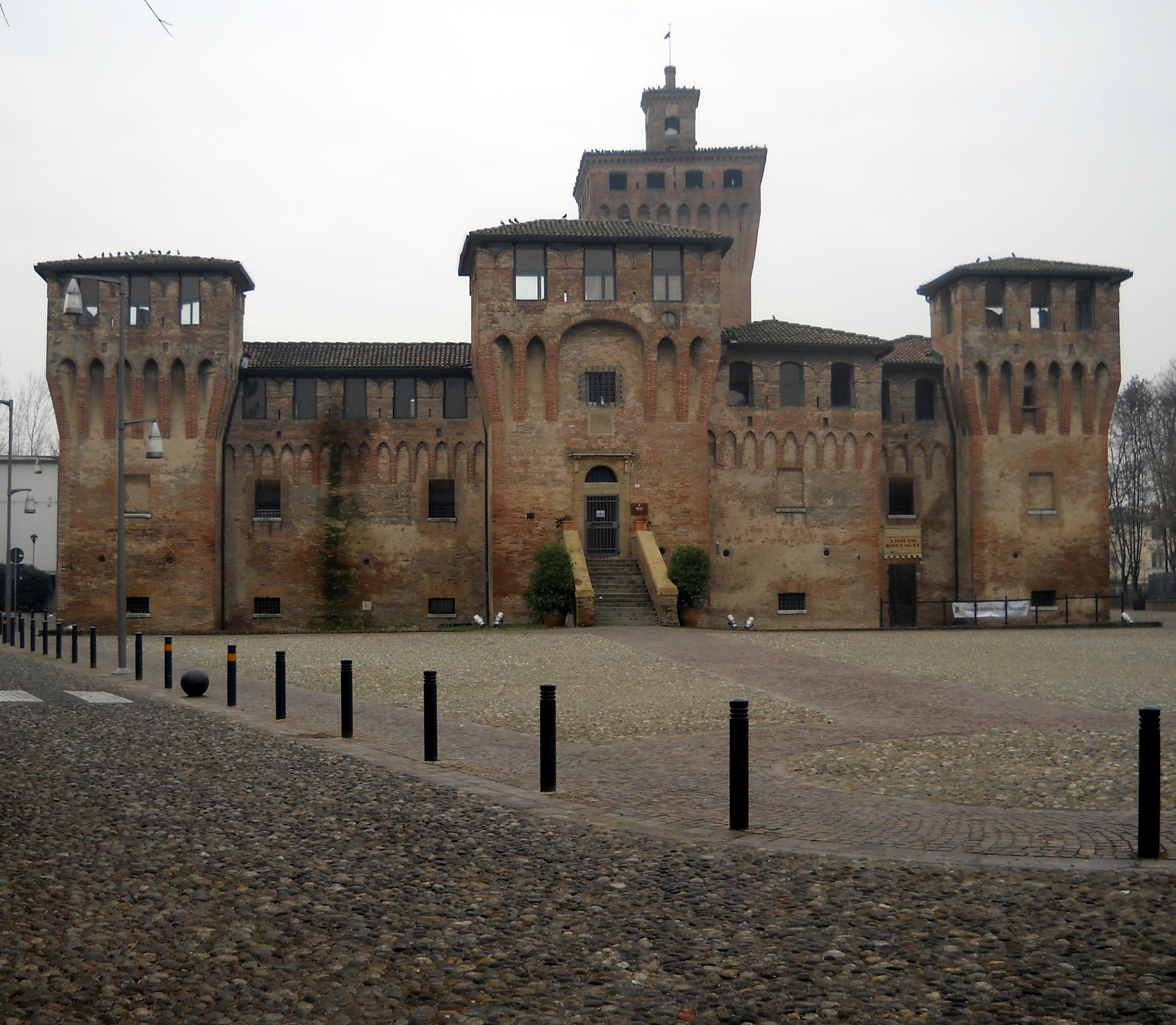
Cento

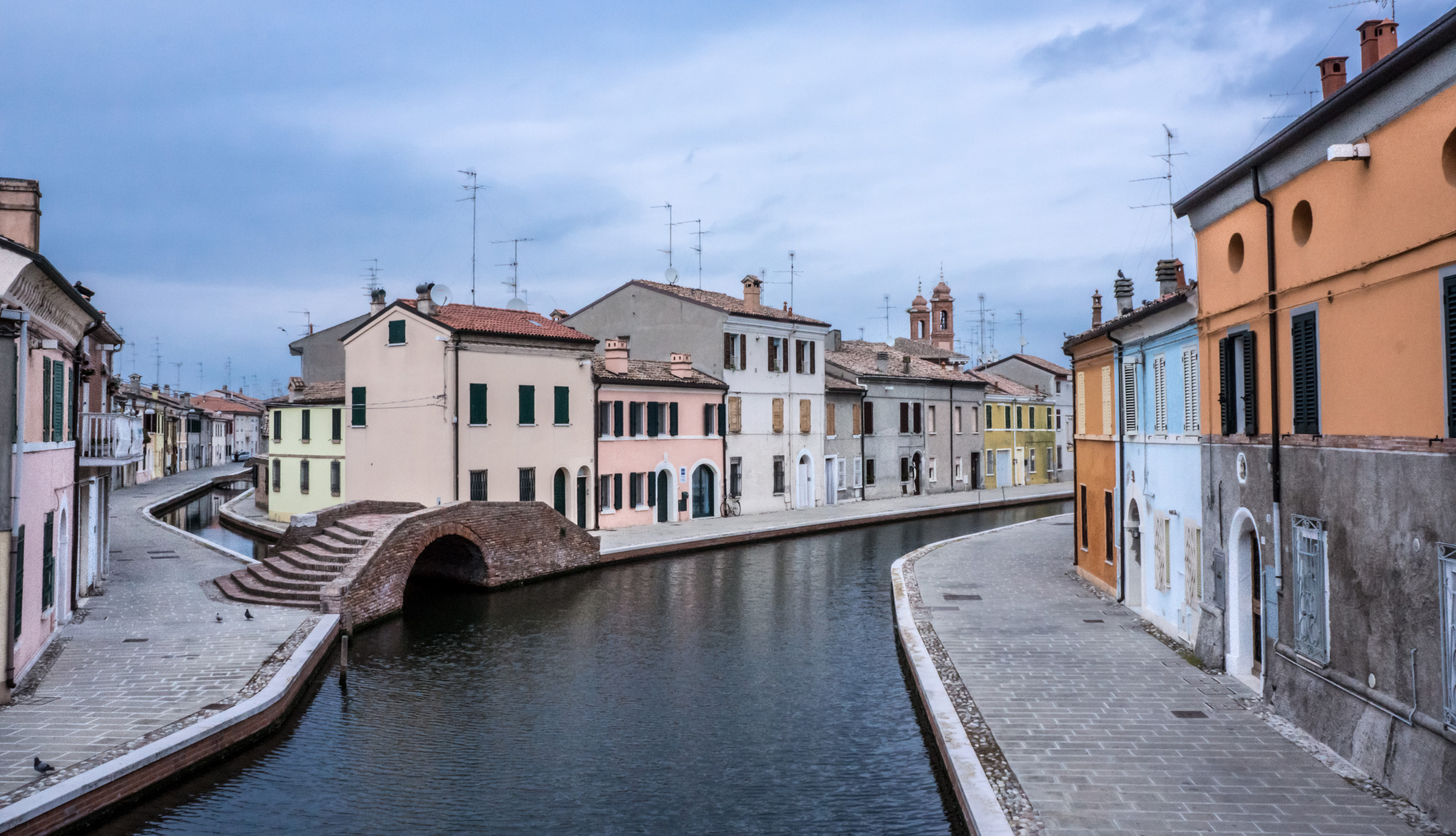
Comacchio

The province has 21 municipalities:

- Argenta
- Bondeno
- Cento
- Codigoro
- Comacchio
- Copparo
- Ferrara
- Fiscaglia
- Goro
- Jolanda di Savoia
- Lagosanto
- Masi Torello
- Mesola
- Ostellato
- Poggio Renatico
- Portomaggiore
- Riva del Po
- Terre del Reno
- Tresignana
- Vigarano Mainarda
- Voghiera

== Demographics ==
As of 2026, the population is 340,482, of which 48.8% are male, and 51.2% are female. Minors make up 12.5% of the population, and seniors make up 29.4%.

Historical population

Year	Pop.	±%
1861	196,254	—
1871	210,814	+7.4%
1881	225,489	+7.0%
1901	265,936	+17.9%
1911	305,360	+14.8%
1921	341,617	+11.9%
1931	368,998	+8.0%
1936	381,299	+3.3%

Year	Pop.	±%
1951	420,557	+10.3%
1961	403,218	−4.1%
1971	383,639	−4.9%
1981	381,118	−0.7%
1991	360,763	−5.3%
2001	344,323	−4.6%
2011	353,481	+2.7%
2021	339,573	−3.9%

Source: ISTAT

=== Immigration ===
As of 2025, immigrants make up 13.2% of the total population. The 5 largest foreign countries of birth are Morocco, Romania, Pakistan, Ukraine, and Moldova.

== Transport ==
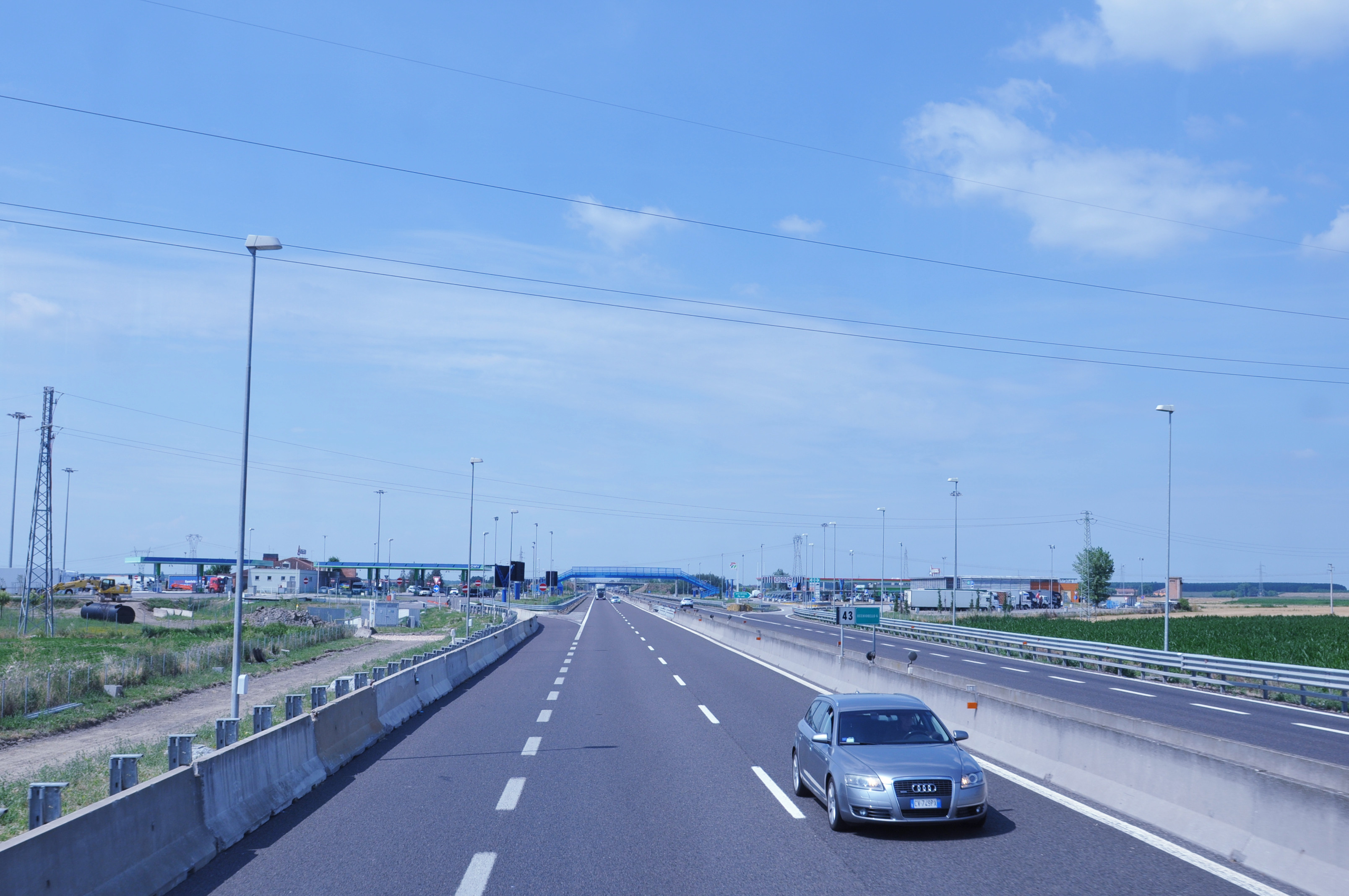
Autostrada A13 near Ferrara

=== Motorways ===
- Autostrada A13: Bologna-Padua

=== Railway lines ===
- Padua–Bologna railway
