= 1995 Italian local elections =

The 1995 Italian local elections were held on 23 April (with runoffs on 7 May) and 19 November (with runoffs on 3 December). For many cities, they were the first elections conducted after the introduction of the direct election of mayors and presidents of provinces in 1993.

In Aosta Valley the elections were held on 28 May (with runoffs on 11 June). In Trentino-Alto Adige the elections were held on 4 June (with runoffs on 18 June).

The elections marked the triumph of the centre-left alliance formed by the Democratic Party of the Left (PDS) of Massimo D’Alema and the Italian People's Party (PPI) of Mino Martinazzoli, while the centre-right alliance of Silvio Berlusconi — whose government fell in December 1994 — was heavily defeated.

The first round of April elections were held on the same day of the regional elections.

== Voting system ==
The semipresidential voting system was the one used for all mayoral elections in Italy of cities with a population higher than 15,000. Under this system voters express a direct choice for the mayor or an indirect choice voting for the party of the candidate's coalition. If no candidate receives at least 50% of votes, the top two candidates go to a run-off after two weeks. The winning candidate obtains a majority bonus equal to 60% of seats in the City Council. During the first round, if no candidate gets more than 50% of votes but a coalition of lists gets the majority of 50% of votes or if the mayor is elected in the first round but its coalition gets less than 40% of the valid votes, the majority bonus cannot be assigned to the coalition of the winning mayor candidate.

The election of the City Council is based on a direct choice for the candidate with a maximum of one preferential vote: the candidate with the majority of the preferences is elected. The number of the seats for each party is determined proportionally, using D'Hondt seat allocation. Only coalitions with more than 3% of votes are eligible to get any seats.

== Municipal elections ==
=== Mayoral election results ===
Centre-left coalition (The Olive Tree)
Centre-right coalition (Pole for Freedoms)

Region	City	Incumbent mayor	Elected mayor	1st round		2nd round		Seats	Source
Region	City	Incumbent mayor	Elected mayor	Votes	%	Votes	%	Seats	Source
April elections
Piedmont	Biella	Gianluca Susta (PPI)	Gianluca Susta (PPI)	12,090	37.68	16,406	53.94	24 / 40	
Piedmont	Cuneo	Giuseppe Menardi (PPI)	Elio Rostagno (Ind)	14,407	39.75	22,265	67.31	24 / 40	
Piedmont	Verbania	Aldo Reschigna (PDS)	Aldo Reschigna (PDS)	8,583	41.90	11,484	61.05	24 / 40	
Piedmont	Vercelli	Elio Priore	Gabriele Bagnasco (FdV)	9,112	27.43	17,775	56.71	24 / 40	
Lombardy	Bergamo	Gian Pietro Galizzi (PPI)	Guido Vicentini (PPI)	19,301	23.88	39,492	53.01	24 / 40	
Lombardy	Cremona	Alfeo Garini (PPI)	Paolo Bodini (PDS)	23,861	45.38	31,145	63.48	24 / 40	
Lombardy	Mantua	Claudia Corradini (PRI)	Chiara Pinfari (PPI)	13,793	38.86	19,754	65.21	24 / 40	
Veneto	Padua	Flavio Zanonato (PDS)	Flavio Zanonato (PDS)	47,787	31.95	82,700	59.76	24 / 40	
Veneto	Vicenza	Achille Varriati (PPI)	Mario Quaresimin (PPI)	25,290	34.63	34,245	50.92	24 / 40	
Friuli-Venezia Giulia	Udine	Claudio Mussato (PPI)	Enzo Barazza (PRI)	17,869	27.64	31,276	52.12	24 / 40	
Liguria	Imperia	Claudio Scajola (PPI)	Davide Berio (PDS)	9,520	33.62	14,879	55.63	24 / 40	
Emilia-Romagna	Bologna	Walter Vitali (PDS)	Walter Vitali (PDS)	145,664	50.41	—	—	28 / 46	
Emilia-Romagna	Ferrara	Roberto Soffritti (PDS)	Roberto Soffritti (PDS)	46,817	45.71	55,378	60.70	24 / 40	
Emilia-Romagna	Forlì	Sauro Sedioli (PDS)	Franco Rusticali (PDS)	45,582	57.26	—	—	24 / 40	
Emilia-Romagna	Modena	Pier Camillo Beccaria (PDS)	Giuliano Barbolini (PDS)	75,508	59.94	—	—	25 / 40	
Emilia-Romagna	Reggio nell'Emilia	Antonella Spaggiari (PDS)	Antonella Spaggiari (PDS)	62,223	64.78	—	—	27 / 40	
Emilia-Romagna	Rimini	Giuseppe Chicchi (PDS)	Giuseppe Chicchi (PDS)	43,938	48.22	44,795	56.79	24 / 40	
Tuscany	Arezzo	Valdo Vannucci (PSI)	Paolo Ricci (PPI)	29,587	47.48	33,496	60.85	24 / 40	
Tuscany	Florence	Giorgio Morales (PSI)	Mario Primicerio (Ind)	158,746	59.94	—	—	29 / 46	
Tuscany	Livorno	Gianfranco Lamberti (PDS)	Gianfranco Lamberti (PDS)	57,617	51.07	—	—	24 / 40	
Tuscany	Prato	Claudio Martini (PDS)	Fabrizio Mattei (PDS)	60,988	54.58	—	—	24 / 40	
Umbria	Perugia	Mario Valentini (PSI)	Gianfranco Maddoli (Ind)	57,629	56.23	—	—	24 / 40	
Marche	Ascoli Piceno	Nazzareno Cappelli (PPI)	Roberto Allevi (PDS)	13,239	37.07	18,602	56.01	24 / 40	
Marche	Pesaro	Oriano Giovanelli (PDS)	Oriano Giovanelli (PDS)	29,194	46.83	34,011	60.42	24 / 40	
Lazio	Frosinone	Sandro Lunghi (PPI)	Paolo Fanelli (FI)	13,750	43.51	15,888	52.17	24 / 40	
Lazio	Viterbo	Giuseppe Fioroni (PPI)	Marcello Meroi (AN)	17,014	40.51	21,999	56.14	24 / 40	
Abruzzo	Teramo	Antonio Gatti (PPI)	Angelo Sperandio (PDS)	18,167	50.81	—	—	21 / 40	
Molise	Campobasso	Vincenzo Di Grezia (PPI)	Augusto Massa (PDS)	14,551	43.46	19,604	65.84	24 / 40	
Campania	Avellino	Angelo Romano (PPI)	Antonio Di Nunno (PPI)	9,370	25.57	17,986	52.75	24 / 40	
Apulia	Bari	Giovanni Memola (PSI)	Simeone Di Cagno Abbrescia (FI)	112,121	56.20	—	—	28 / 46	
Apulia	Foggia	Salvatore Chirolli (PPI)	Paolo Agostinacchio (AN)	28,020	30.91	42,353	54.90	24 / 40	
Apulia	Lecce	Francesco Corvaglia (PPI)	Stefano Salvemini (PDS)	22,379	38.07	27,388	53.39	24 / 40	
Basilicata	Potenza	Rocco Sampogna (PPI)	Domenico Potenza (PDS)	14,494	33.09	24,025	59.13	24 / 40	
Sardinia	Nuoro	Francesco Zuddas (PLI)	Carlo Forteleoni (PPI)	13,962	58.12	—	—	25 / 40	
Sardinia	Sassari	Giacomo Spissu (PSI)	Anna Sanna (PDS)	30,914	40.06	38,215	58.27	24 / 40	
May – June elections
Aosta Valley	Aosta	Giulio Fiou (PDS)	Pier Luigi Thiébat (UV)	12,676	54.98	—	—	19 / 29	
Trentino-Alto Adige/Südtirol	Bolzano	Marcello Ferrari (PPI)	Giovanni Salghetti (Ind)	22,515	36.64	30,182	54.82	18 / 50	
Trentino-Alto Adige/Südtirol	Trento	Lorenzo Dellai (PPI)	Lorenzo Dellai (PPI)	34,559	51.71	—	—	30 / 50	

== Provincial elections ==
=== Presidential election results ===
Centre-left coalition (The Olive Tree)
Centre-right coalition (Pole for Freedoms)
Centrist coalition (PPI and allies)
Northern League (LN)

Region	Province	Incumbent president	Elected president	1st round		2nd round		Seats
Region	Province	Incumbent president	Elected president	Votes	%	Votes	%	Seats
April elections
Piedmont	Alessandria	Massimo Bianchi (PPI)	Fabrizio Palenzona (PPI)	100,175	36.0	131,284	55.2	18 / 30
Piedmont	Asti	Luciano Grassi (PLI)	Giuseppe Goria (PDS)	21,128	16.7	56,562	52.7	14 / 24
Piedmont	Biella	New Province	Silvia Marsoni (FdV)	41,386	36.0	64,160	55.7	14 / 24
Piedmont	Cuneo	Giovanni Quaglia (PPI)	Giovanni Quaglia (PPI)	143,610	43.5	181,328	65.0	18 / 30
Piedmont	Novara	Luciano De Silvestri (FdV)	Paolo Cattaneo (PPI)	72,993	34.2	97,353	53.3	18 / 30
Piedmont	Turin	Luigi Ricca (PSI)	Mercedes Bresso (PDS)	490,233	36.7	674,678	60.4	27 / 45
Piedmont	Verbano-Cusio-Ossola	New Province	Giuseppe Ravasio (PPI)	72,993	34.2	97,353	53.3	18 / 30
Piedmont	Vercelli	Gilberto Valeri (PDS)	Gilberto Valeri (PDS)	33,880	33.8	53,619	50.8	14 / 24
Lombardy	Bergamo	Gianfranco Ceruti (PPI)	Giovanni Cappelluzzo (LN)	190,704	31.2	321,523	61.4	22 / 36
Lombardy	Brescia	Costanzo Valli (PSI)	Andrea Lepidi (PPI)	197,791	28.9	335,278	57.9	22 / 36
Lombardy	Como	Luciano Bettiga (PSI)	Giuseppe Livio (Ind)	86,276	26.3	148,632	53.9	18 / 30
Lombardy	Cremona	Gian Carlo Corada (PDS)	Gian Carlo Corada (PDS)	79,787	36.5	121,007	58.8	18 / 30
Lombardy	Lecco	New Province	Mario Anghileri (PPI)	61,977	32.7	102,516	61.8	14 / 24
Lombardy	Lodi	New Province	Lorenzo Guerini (PPI)	46,346	37.9	65,904	58.5	14 / 24
Lombardy	Milan	Massimo Zanello (LN)	Livio Tamberi (PPI)	670,403	29.6	1,026,678	53.3	27 / 45
Lombardy	Sondrio	Sergio Pasina (PPI)	Enrico Dioli (PPI)	30,374	28.7	49,739	57.1	14 / 24
Veneto	Belluno	Oscar De Bona (PSI)	Oscar De Bona (Ind)	48,473	39.1	71,266	70.0	14 / 24
Veneto	Padua	Giuseppe Barbieri (PPI)	Renzo Sacco (LN)	156,788	29.7	276,290	56.5	22 / 36
Veneto	Rovigo	Alberto Brigo (PPI)	Alberto Brigo (PPI)	59,117	36.4	85,712	58.7	14 / 24
Veneto	Treviso	Domenico Citron (PPI)	Giovanni Mazzonetto (LN)	205,505	43.5	255,971	65.2	22 / 36
Veneto	Venice	Anna Luisa Furlan (PDS)	Luigino Busatto (PPI)	225,103	42.9	273,774	61.8	22 / 36
Veneto	Verona	Alberto Fenzi (PSI)	Antonio Borghesi (LN)	178,176	35.4	231,071	54.0	22 / 36
Veneto	Vicenza	Giuseppina Dal Santo (PPI)	Giuseppe Doppio (PPI)	148,581	31.4	268,003	61.4	22 / 36
Friuli-Venezia Giulia	Pordenone	Sergio Chiarotto (PPI)	Alberto Rossi (PPI)	60,185	34.4	91,805	60.9	14 / 24
Friuli-Venezia Giulia	Udine	Tiziano Venier (PPI)	Giovanni Pelizzo (PPI)	94,806	28.7	163,967	56.6	18 / 30
Liguria	Imperia	Luciano Demichelis (PPI)	Gabriele Boscetto (FI)	60,333	46.2	60,857	53.1	14 / 24
Liguria	Savona	Mario Robutti (PSI)	Alessandro Garassini (PPI)	66,867	36.1	95,568	57.2	14 / 24
Emilia-Romagna	Bologna	Lamberto Cotti (PSI)	Vittorio Prodi (PPI)	377,068	59.5	–	–	22 / 36
Emilia-Romagna	Ferrara	Francesco Ruvinetti (PSI)	Paolo Siconolfi (PPI)	126,347	50.7	–	–	18 / 30
Emilia-Romagna	Forlì-Cesena	Maria Luisa Bargossi (PDS)	Piero Gallina (PRI)		57.6	–	–	18 / 30
Emilia-Romagna	Modena	Giorgio Baldini (PSI)	Graziano Pattuzzi (PPI)	265,018	62.4	–	–	20 / 30
Emilia-Romagna	Parma	Claudio Magnani (PSI)	Corrado Truffelli (PPI)	126,317	47.4	154,696	67.5	18 / 30
Emilia-Romagna	Piacenza	Renato Zurla (PSDI)	Dario Squeri (PPI)	66,185	37.1	100,490	59.1	14 / 24
Emilia-Romagna	Reggio Emilia	Ascanio Bertani (PSI)	Roberto Ruini (PPI)	198,719	66.3	–	–	21 / 30
Emilia-Romagna	Rimini	New Province	Ermanno Vichi (PPI)	93,422	51.4	–	–	14 / 24
Tuscany	Arezzo	Mauro Tarchi (PDS)	Mauro Tarchi (PDS)	112,540	53.9	–	–	18 / 30
Tuscany	Florence	Mila Pieralli (PDS)	Michele Gesualdi (PPI)	364,197	56.7	–	–	22 / 36
Tuscany	Grosseto	Lamberto Ciani (PSI)	Stefano Gentili (PPI)	53,201	36.8	76,746	58.1	14 / 24
Tuscany	Livorno	Claudio Frontera (PDS)	Claudio Frontera (PDS)		56.5	–	–	18 / 30
Tuscany	Pisa	Gino Nunes (PDS)	Gino Nunes (PDS)		62.1	–	–	20 / 30
Tuscany	Pistoia	Aldo Morelli (PDS)	Aldo Morelli (PDS)		45.3		63.3	14 / 24
Tuscany	Prato	New Province	Daniele Mannocci (Ind)		48.0		68.2	14 / 24
Tuscany	Siena	Alessandro Starnini (PDS)	Alessandro Starnini (PDS)		54.6	–	–	14 / 24
Umbria	Perugia	Marcello Panettoni (PDS)	Mariano Borgognoni (PDS)		60.1	–	–	18 / 30
Umbria	Terni	Alberto Provantini (PDS)	Nicola Molè (CS)		54.3	–	–	14 / 24
Marche	Ascoli Piceno	Romualdo Cafini (PPI)	Pietro Colonnella (PDS)		45.4		56.4	18 / 30
Marche	Macerata	Luigi Sileoni (PPI)	Sauro Pigliapoco (Ind)		44.0		53.9	14 / 24
Marche	Pesaro e Urbino	Umberto Bernardini (PDS)	Umberto Bernardini (PDS)		62.5	–	–	19 / 30
Lazio	Frosinone	Domenico Testani (PPI)	Loreto Gentile (PPI)		41.8		52.7	18 / 30
Lazio	Latina	Severino Del Balzo (PRI)	Paride Martella (CCD)		59.2	–	–	19 / 30
Lazio	Rieti	Cesare Giuliani (PPI)	Giosuè Calabrese (PPI)		38.7		52.1	14 / 24
Lazio	Rome	Achille Ricci (PLI)	Giorgio Fregosi (PDS)	860,474	37.1	993,315	51.1	27 / 45
Abruzzo	Chieti	Mario Amicone (PPI)	Manfredi Pulsinelli (PPI)	86,496	37.3	103,275	52.6	18 / 30
Abruzzo	L'Aquila	Franco Di Giannantonio (PPI)	Palmiero Susi (CCD)	87,925	47.7	78,779	51.5	14 / 24
Abruzzo	Pescara	Fortunato Di Sipio (PPI)	Luciano D'Alfonso (PPI)	79,737	44.1	87,958	56.5	14 / 24
Abruzzo	Teramo	Claudio Ruffini (PDS)	Claudio Ruffini (PDS)	79,157	45.4	93,008	61.6	14 / 24
Molise	Campobasso	Antonio Chieffo (PPI)	Antonio Chieffo (PPI)	67,370	48.2	73,782	59.1	14 / 24
Molise	Isernia	Attilio Peluso (PSI)	Domenico Pellegrino (PDS)	10,920	19.6	25,429	53.5	14 / 24
Campania	Avellino	Rosanna Repole (PPI)	Luigi Anzalone (PDS)	69,218	27.2	123,826	57.9	18 / 30
Campania	Benevento	Mario Serino (PPI)	Roberto Russo (FI)	59,343	41.1	75,828	52.4	14 / 24
Campania	Naples	Rosa Russo (PPI)	Amato Lamberti (FdV)	642,240	42.8	612,336	57.4	27 / 45
Campania	Salerno	Ettore Liguori (PRI)	Alfonso Andria (PPI)	245,957	41.2	253,724	51.2	22 / 36
Apulia	Bari	Domenico Ricchiuti (PPI)	Francesco Sorrentino (FI)	368,362	45.8	324,105	51.1	27 / 45
Apulia	Brindisi	Luigi De Michele (PSI)	Nicola Frugis (FI)	124,678	57.0	–	–	18 / 30
Apulia	Lecce	Luigi Marcelli (PPI)	Lorenzo Ria (PPI)	174,980	38.5	194,273	51.0	22 / 36
Apulia	Taranto	Marco D'Alconzo (PSI)	Marcello Cantore (FI)	150,113	47.2	136,589	50.7	18 / 30
Basilicata	Matera	Rocco Grieco (PPI)	Angelo Tataranno (PDS)	57,852	50.3	–	–	14 / 24
Basilicata	Potenza	Donato Salvatore (PSI)	Domenico Salvatore (PDS)	122,188	52.8	–	–	18 / 30
Calabria	Catanzaro	Marcello Barberio (PDS)	Giuseppe Martino (Ind)	88,903	45.1	81,066	52.2	18 / 30
Calabria	Cosenza	Antonio Acri (PDS)	Antonio Acri (PDS)	159,699	42.0	164,273	55.5	22 / 36
Calabria	Crotone	New Province	Carmine Talarico (PDS)	47,583	54.8	–	–	15 / 24
Calabria	Vibo Valentia	New Province	Enzo Romeo (Ind)	40,156	41.6	43,026	53.3	14 / 24
Sardinia	Cagliari	Cecilia Contu (PSd'Az)	Nicola Scano (PS)	190,460	45.5	196,717	57.8	22 / 36
Sardinia	Nuoro	Federico Caredda (PPI)	Giuseppe Matteo Pirisi (PDS)	84,847	54.4	–	–	14 / 24
Sardinia	Oristano	Ezio Collu (PSI)	Gian Valerio Sanna (PPI)	46,516	50.2	–	–	14 / 24
Sardinia	Sassari	Antonio Pompedda (PDS)	Pietro Soddu (PPI)	139,184	53.3	–	–	18 / 30
