= Ivan Guarducci =

Italian politician and physician (born 1941)

President of the Province of Verbano-Cusio-Ossola
- In office 28 June 1999 – 28 June 2004
- Preceded by: Giuseppe Ravasio
- Succeeded by: Paolo Ravaioli

Personal details
- Born: 23 May 1941 (age 85) Prato, Province of Florence, Kingdom of Italy
- Party: Forza Italia; The People of Freedom
- Profession: Physician

Ivan Guarducci (born 23 May 1941) is an Italian physician and politician who served as president of the Province of Verbano-Cusio-Ossola from 1999 to 2004.

== Life and career ==
Guarducci worked as a physician and served as chief of orthopaedics at the hospital in Domodossola.

A member of Forza Italia, Guarducci was elected president of the Province of Verbano-Cusio-Ossola in the 1999 provincial election, winning against centre-left candidate Enrico Borghi. During his presidency, Guarducci promoted the construction of a single hospital for the Verbano-Cusio-Ossola area. The proposed project, which envisaged a hospital at Piedimulera, was never completed and was subsequently abandoned after political opposition.

He sought re-election in 2004, leading the first round with 45.61% of the vote, ahead of centre-left candidate Paolo Ravaioli. At the runoff, however, Ravaioli defeated Guarducci with 51.27% of the vote, ending Guarducci's presidency.
