= List of presidents of the Province of Verbano-Cusio-Ossola =

President of the Province of Verbano-Cusio-Ossola
- Presidente della Provincia del Verbano-Cusio-Ossola
- Incumbent; Giandomenico Albertella since 20 December 2025
- Term length: 4 years
- Inaugural holder: Giuseppe Ravasio
- Formation: 1995

The president of the Province of Verbano-Cusio-Ossola is the head of the provincial government in Verbano-Cusio-Ossola, Piedmont, Italy. The president oversees the administration of the province, coordinates the activities of the municipalities, and represents the province in regional and national matters.

Since December 2025, the office has been held by Giandomenico Albertella.

== History ==
The Province of Verbano-Cusio-Ossola was established in 1992, after being separated from the Province of Novara. In its initial phase, the new province was administered by a government-appointed extraordinary commissioner, Renato Pisani, pending the organisation of its institutional bodies. Following the 1995 elections, Giuseppe Ravasio took office as the first president of the province, marking the beginning of the province's ordinary democratic administration. In accordance with the reform of local authorities introduced in 1993, the president was directly elected by the citizens for a five-year term and was responsible for appointing and dismissing the members of the Provincial Executive.

Following the 2014 Delrio Law, the president is elected by an assembly composed of the mayors and municipal councillors of the municipalities within the province. The president serves a four-year term and acts as the legal representative of the province, presiding over the Provincial Council and the Provincial Assembly of Mayors.

== List ==
No.	Portrait	Name	Term start	Term end	Party	Election
1		Giuseppe Ravasio	8 May 1995	31 January 1999	Italian People's Party	1995
–		Paolo Ravaioli (Acting vice president)	31 January 1999	28 June 1999	Democrats of the Left	1995
2		Ivan Guarducci	28 June 1999	28 June 2004	Forza Italia	1999
3		Paolo Ravaioli	28 June 2004	8 June 2009	Democrats of the Left; Democratic Party	2004
4		Massimo Nobili	8 June 2009	13 October 2014	The People of Freedom	2009
5		Stefano Costa	13 October 2014	1 November 2018	Democratic Party	2014
6		Arturo Lincio	1 November 2018	21 October 2021	Independent (centre-right)	2018
–		Rino Porini (Acting vice president)	21 October 2021	22 December 2021	Forza Italia	2018
7		Alessandro Lana	22 December 2021	20 December 2025	Independent (centre-right)	2021
8		Giandomenico Albertella	20 December 2025	Incumbent	Independent (centre-right)	2025

== Sources ==
- "Storia amministrativa dell'ente". Ministero dell'Interno.
