= Rattenberg =

Rattenberg Råttnberg
- Municipality
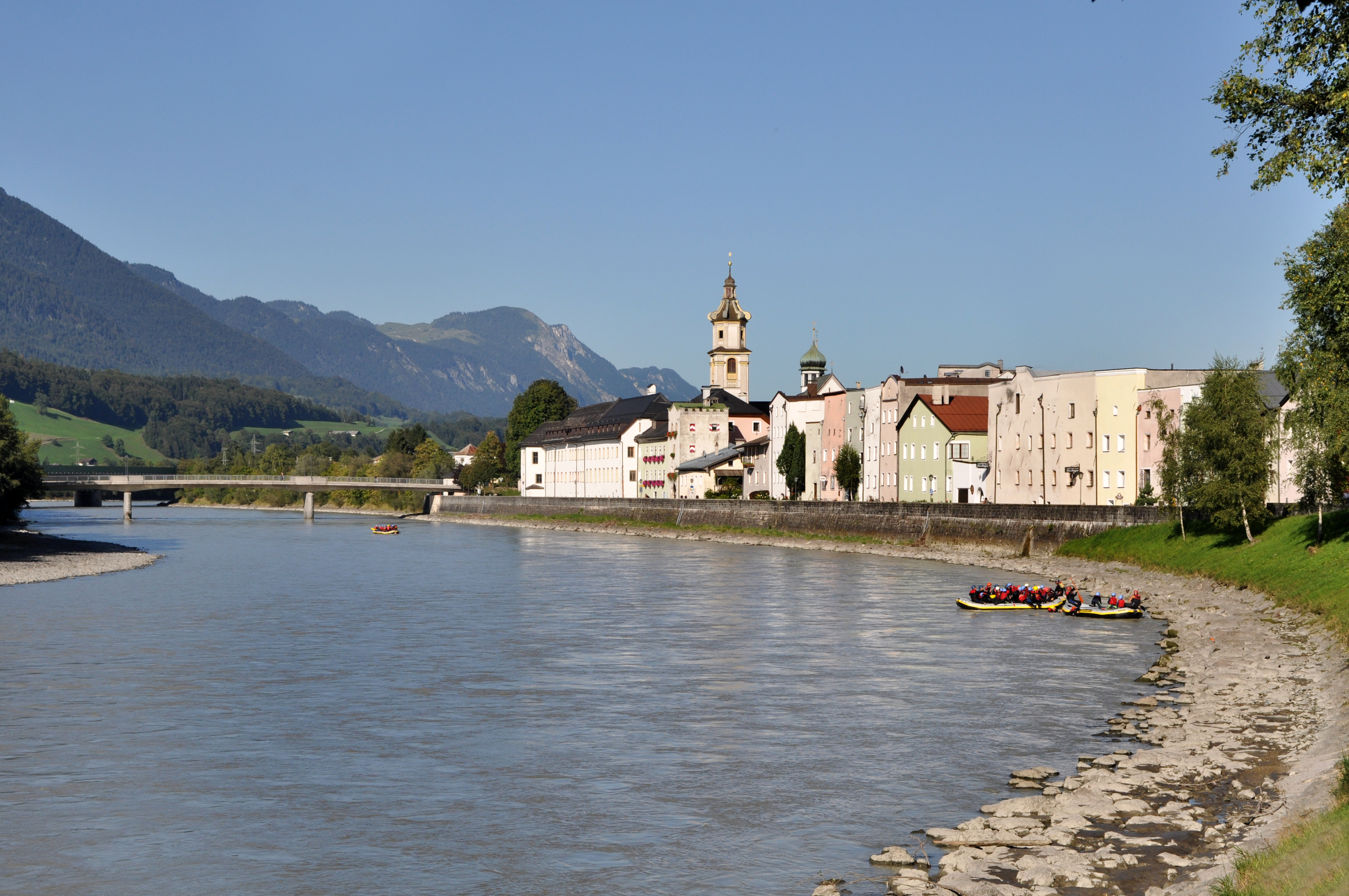
- Rattenberg

- Coat of arms

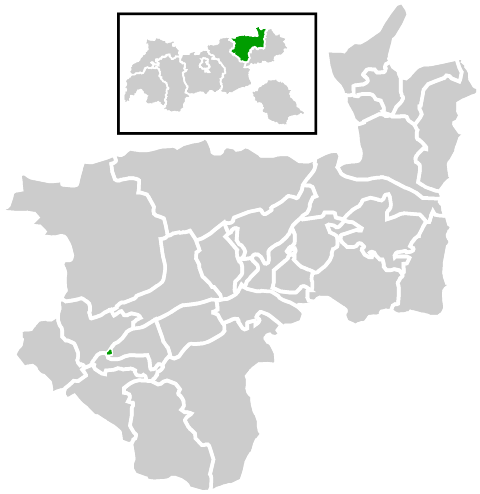
- Location within Kufstein district

- Location within Austria
- Coordinates: 47°26′20″N 11°53′36″E
- Country: Austria
- State: Tyrol
- District: Kufstein

Government
  - Mayor: Bernhard Freiberger (FPÖ)

Area
  - Total: 0.11 km^{2} (0.042 sq mi)
- Elevation: 521 m (1,709 ft)

Population (2019-01-01)
  - Total: 408
  - Density: 3,700/km^{2} (9,600/sq mi)
- Time zone: UTC+1 (CET)
  - Summer (DST): UTC+2 (CEST)
- Postal code: 6240
- Area code: +43 5337
- Vehicle registration: KU
- Website: www.rattenberg.at

Rattenberg (Austrian German pronunciation: [ˈratn̩bɛrɡ]; Bavarian: Råttnberg) is a town on the Inn River in the Austrian state of Tyrol near Rattenberg mountain and Innsbruck. With just 400 inhabitants and a surface area of 10 ha, it is the smallest city in the country.

== Geography ==
The proximity of a mountain to the south of the town means that Rattenberg, like many villages nested in steep sided valleys throughout the Tyrol region of the Alps, receives no direct sunlight for much of the winter. It is one of the few places at a significant southerly latitude that experiences a prolonged period without direct sunlight (another is Viganella, Italy), although the sky remains bright while the town is in the mountain's shadow so there is no permanent darkness or 'polar night' as experienced north of the Arctic Circle.

== Gallery ==
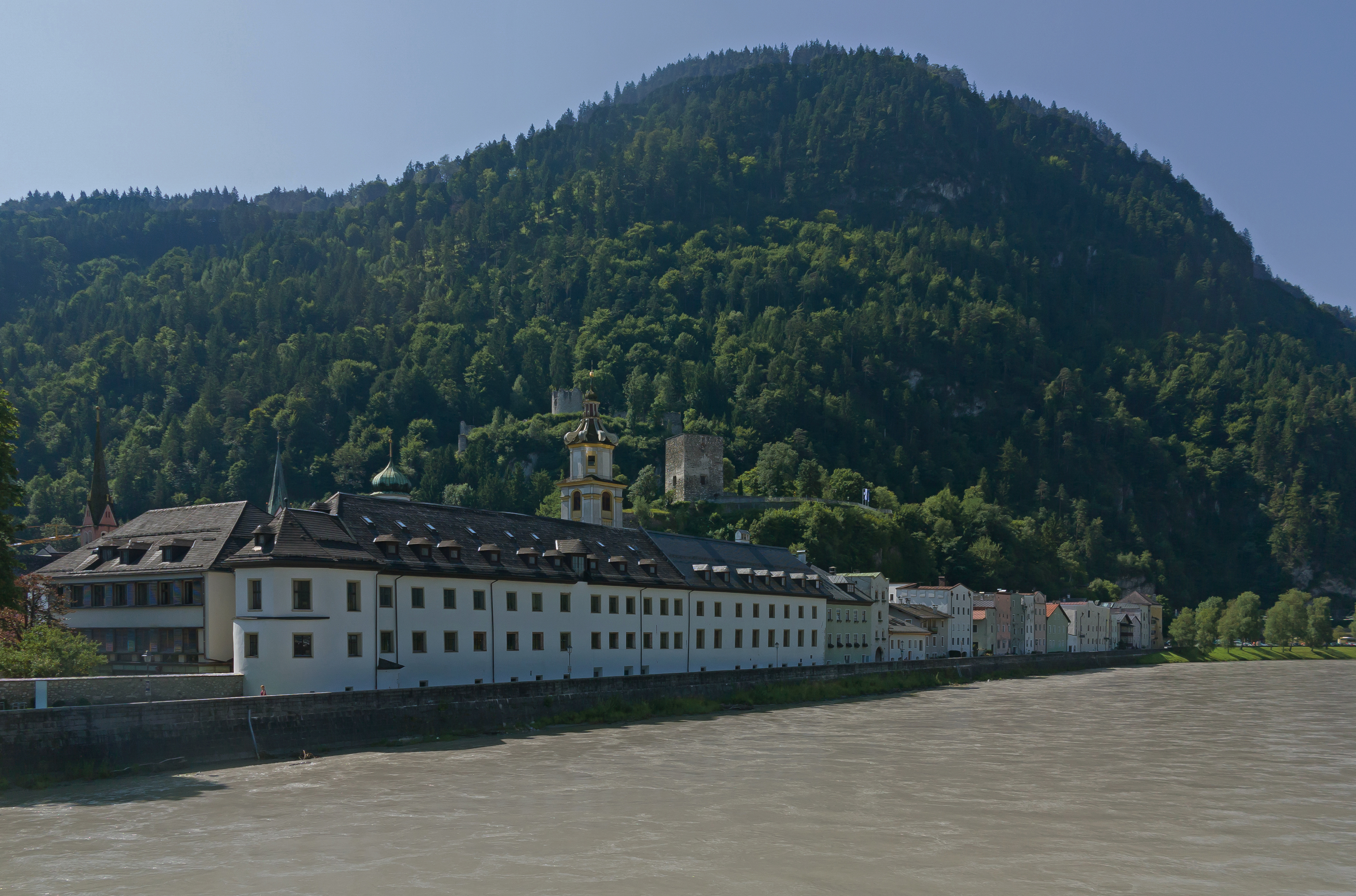
View to the town with former monastery and churchtower

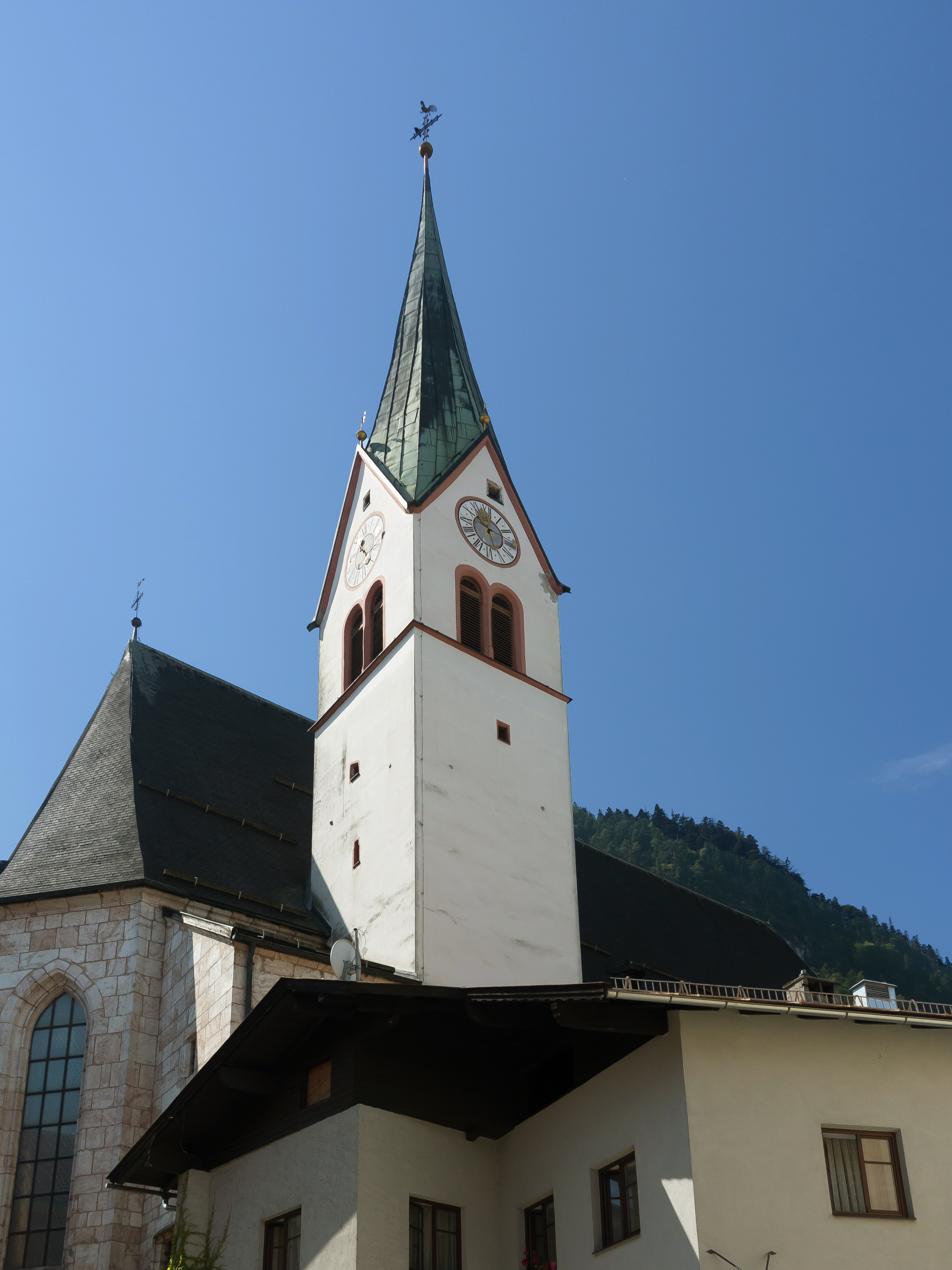
Churchtower (Katholische Pfarrkirche Sankt Virgil)

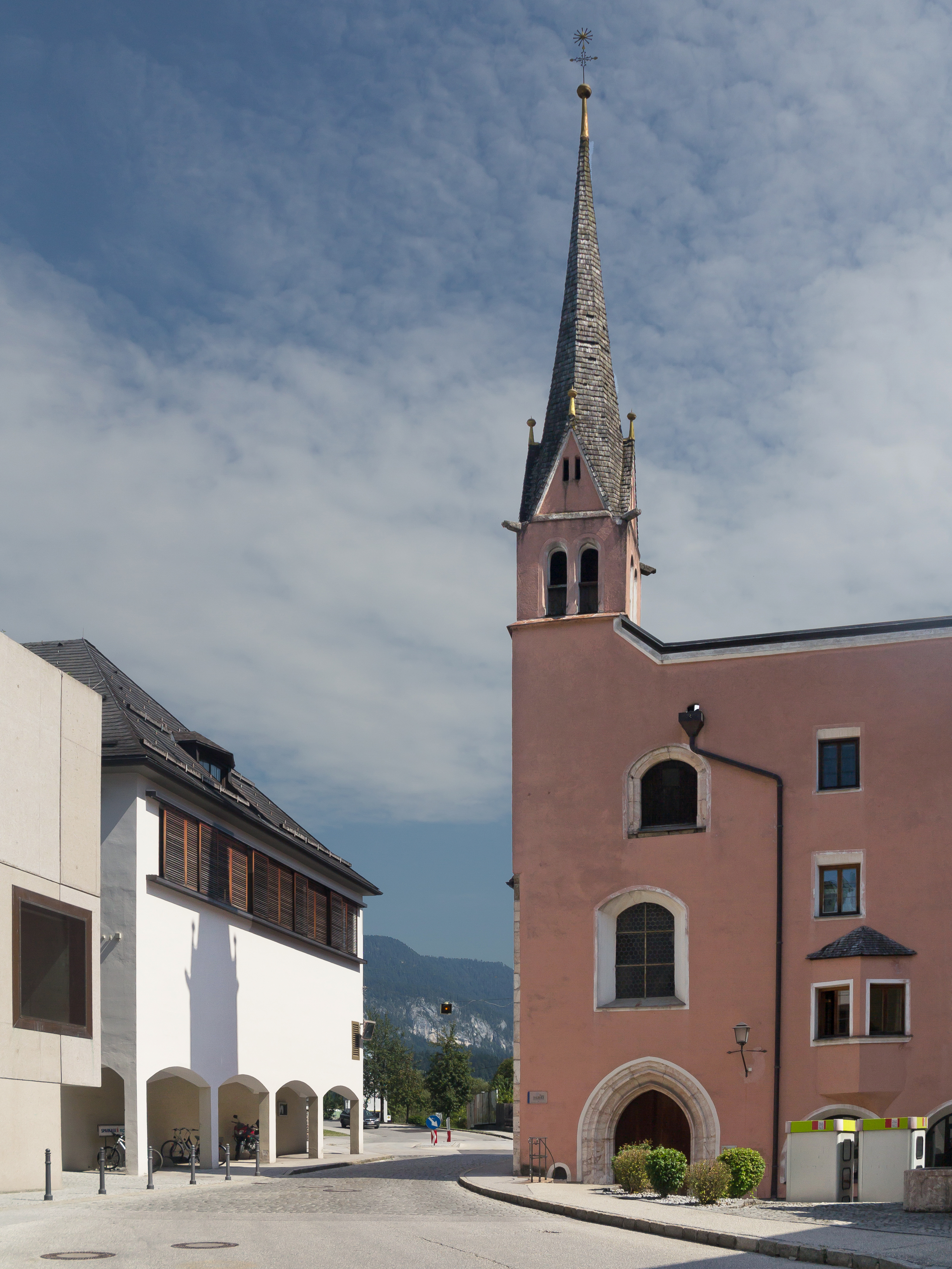
Church: Spitalkirche Heilige Geist

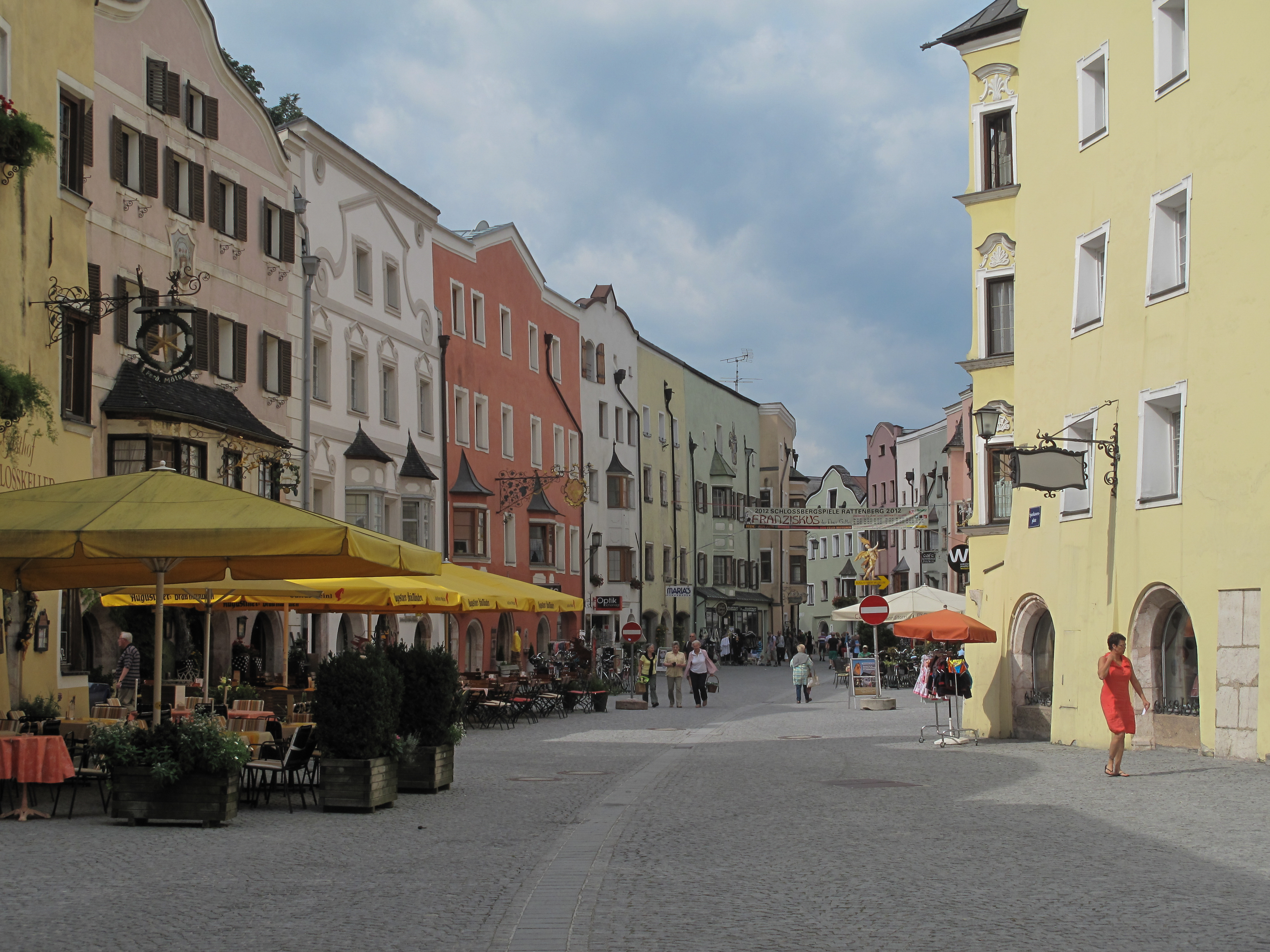
Street view Haussauerstrasse

== History ==
Founded in the 14th century, it was built in the literal shadow of Rat Mountain to protect itself from marauders. Maximilian I had the original town citadel expanded to a formidable fortress.

=== The modern era ===
In November 2005, the town announced they were building 30 specialized rotating mirrors called heliostats to reflect sunlight into parts of the town during the winter months. The $2.4 million operation was suggested by Bartenbach Lichtlabor GmbH, a lighting design company. The EU planned to foot half the bill as of November 2005. However, the project was never implemented.

== Population ==
Historical population
Year	Pop.	±%
1869	679	—
1880	727	+7.1%
1890	737	+1.4%
1900	752	+2.0%
1910	711	−5.5%
1923	701	−1.4%
1934	742	+5.8%
1939	676	−8.9%
1951	879	+30.0%
1961	745	−15.2%
1971	652	−12.5%
1981	590	−9.5%
1991	526	−10.8%
2001	436	−17.1%
2011	405	−7.1%

== Economy ==
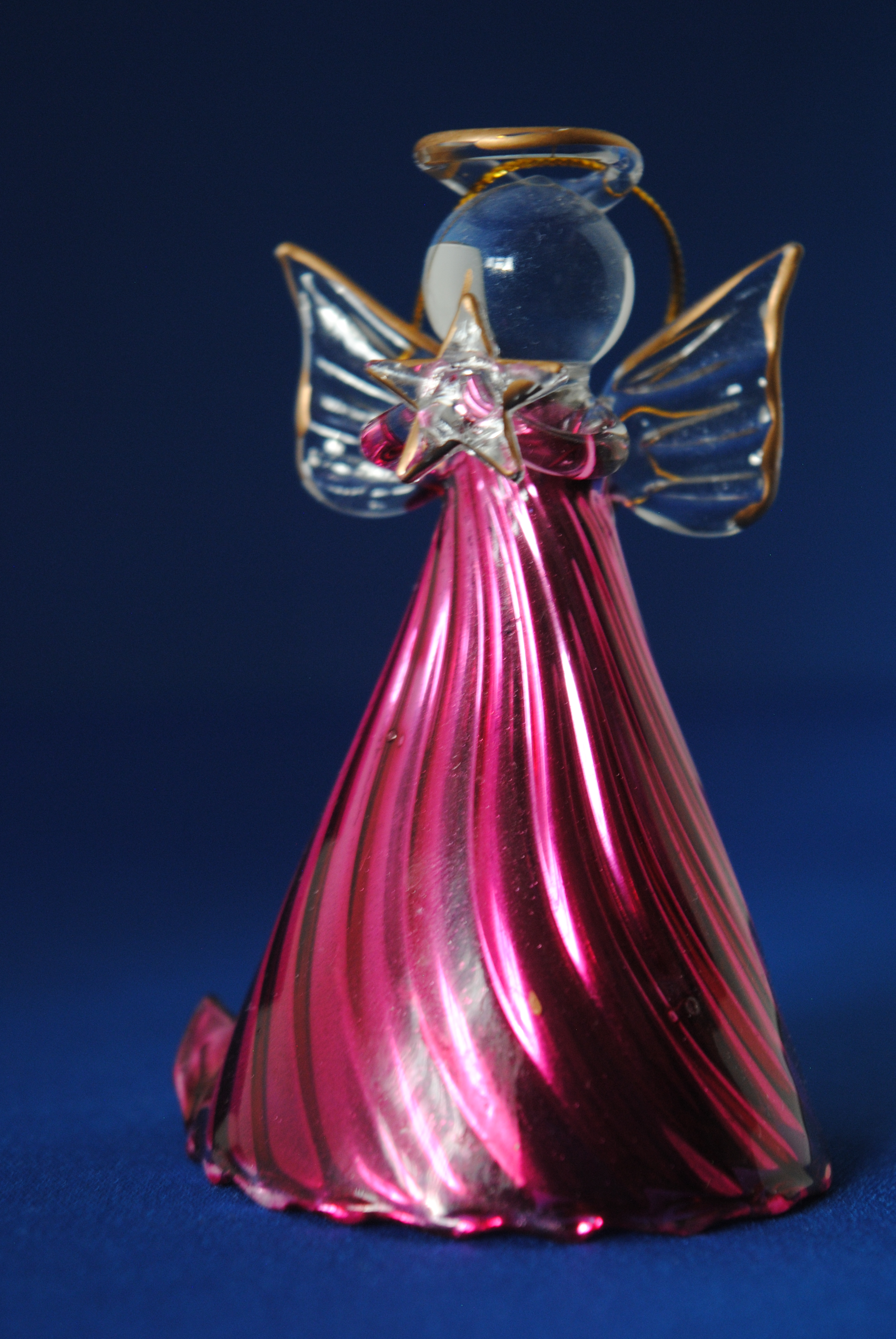
Christmas bauble in the form of a glass bell, shaped like an angel, made and purchased in Rattenberg

Rattenberg has been known for its glass making. Its abundance of crystal glass shops continue the tradition of craftsmanship.

== See also ==
- Rjukan, Norway and Viganella, Italy - other valley settlements that endure a prolonged lack of direct winter sunlight.
