= List of presidents of the Province of Cagliari =

President of the Province of Cagliari
- Presidente della Provincia di Cagliari
- Inaugural holder: Eugenio Boi
- Formation: 1889
- Final holder: Graziano Milia
- Abolished: 2016
- Superseded by: Metropolitan mayor of Cagliari

The president of the Province of Cagliari was the head of the provincial administration of Cagliari, a local government authority in Sardinia, Italy.

== History ==
The office of president of the Province of Cagliari was established in 1889, initially within the Provincial Deputation. Before that date, the Deputation was headed by the prefect. During the Fascist period (1926–1944), the province was governed by appointed officials, including commissioners and presidents of the Rectorate. After World War II, the office was restored and gradually redefined within the Italian Republic, first with indirect election by the Provincial Council and, from 1995, with direct popular election.

The province was eventually replaced in 2016 by the Metropolitan City of Cagliari.

== List ==
=== Presidents of the Provincial Deputation (1889–1926) ===
No.	Portrait	Name	Term of office		Party
No.	Portrait	Name	Start	End	Party
1		Eugenio Boi	1889	1908	?
2		Enrico Marongiu	1908	1912	?
3		Giovanni Marcello	1912	1914	?
4		Umberto Cao	1914	?	?

=== Presidents of the Province (1951–2016) ===
No.	Portrait	Name	Term of office		Party
No.	Portrait	Name	Start	End	Party
		?	?	?	?
		Alberto Palmas	1975	1982	Italian Communist Party
		Giuseppe Putzolu	1982	1985	Italian Communist Party
		Federico Baroschi	1985	1988	Italian Socialist Party
		Walter Piludu	1988	8 August 1990	Italian Communist Party
		Francesco Floris	8 August 1990	16 March 1993	Christian Democracy
		Eliseo Secci	26 March 1993	7 January 1994	Christian Democracy
		Cecilia Contu	7 January 1994	8 May 1995	Sardinian Action Party
		Nicola Scano	8 May 1995	1 May 2000	Democratic Party of the Left; Democrats of the Left
		Sandro Balletto	1 May 2000	10 May 2005	Forza Italia
		Graziano Milia	10 May 2005	13 January 2012	Democrats of the Left; Democratic Party
—		Angela Quaquero (Acting President)	13 January 2012	2 July 2013	Democratic Party
—		Pietro Cadau (Special Commissioner)	2 July 2013	20 April 2014	—
—		Franco Sardi (Special Commissioner)	20 April 2014	4 February 2016	—

== See also ==
- List of mayors of Cagliari
- Metropolitan City of Cagliari

== Sources ==
- "Storia amministrativa dell'ente". Ministero dell'Interno.
- Menichini, Piera (2005). "I presidenti delle Province dall'Unità alla Grande guerra: repertorio analitico". Storia Amministrazione Costituzione (13): 235–236.
