= Stefano Costa =

Italian politician (born 1965)

President of the Province of Verbano-Cusio-Ossola
- In office 13 October 2014 – 1 November 2018
- Preceded by: Massimo Nobili
- Succeeded by: Arturo Lincio

Mayor of Baceno
- In office 25 May 2014 – 27 May 2019
- Preceded by: Rodolfo Angelo Signorini
- Succeeded by: Andrea Vicini
- In office 14 June 1999 – 8 June 2009
- Preceded by: Giuseppe Mandarini
- Succeeded by: Rodolfo Angelo Signorini

Personal details
- Born: 24 March 1965 (age 61) Milan, Italy
- Party: Democratic Party
- Occupation: Teacher

Stefano Costa (born 24 March 1965) is an Italian politician who served as president of the Province of Verbano-Cusio-Ossola from 2014 to 2018 and as mayor of Baceno from 1999 to 2009.

Costa began his political career as a member of the municipal council of Baceno in 1995. He was elected mayor in 1999 and served until 2009, when he became a member of the Provincial Council of Verbania-Cusio-Ossola for the Democratic Party. In June 2014, he was elected mayor of Baceno for a third time. In the 2014 provincial election, the first held under the new system introduced by the Delrio Law, Costa was elected president of the Province of Verbano-Cusio-Ossola with 63,392 weighted votes.

Since 2024, he has served as an assessor in Baceno with responsibility for territorial planning, European projects, waste management, relations with public authorities and institutions, and tourism.
