= Borgomezzavalle =

Coordinates: 46°4′N 8°14′E

Borgomezzavalle Comune di Borgomezzavalle
- Comune
- Municipality of Borgomezzavalle
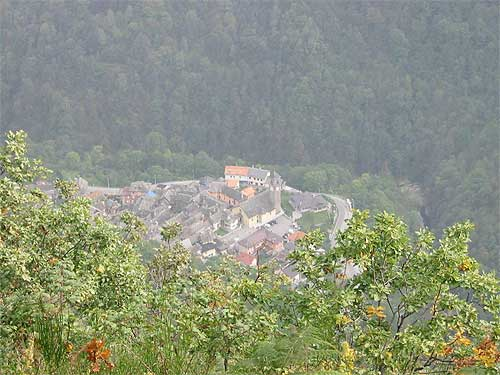
- Viganella, the former capital of its eponymous comune.

- Coat of arms

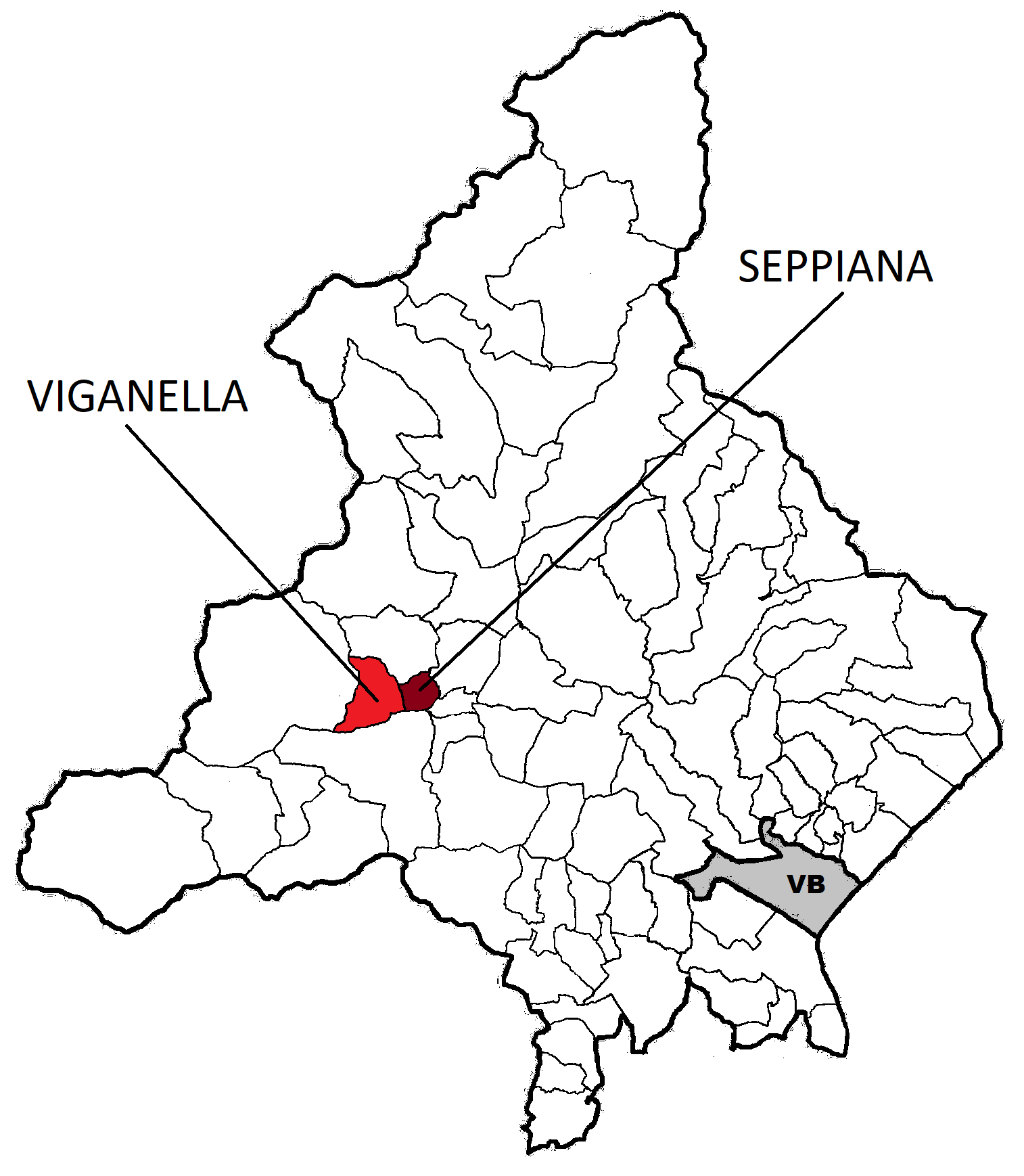
- The former comunes of Seppiana and Viganella, now merged to form Borgomezzavalle.
- Interactive map of Borgomezzavalle
- Location of Borgomezzavalle in Italy Borgomezzavalle (Piedmont)
- Country: Italy
- Region: Piedmont
- Province: Verbano-Cusio-Ossola (VB)
- Frazioni: Camblione, Bordo, Cheggio, Prato, Rivera, Ruginetta.

Government
  - Mayor: Stefano Bellotti (Lista Civica)

Area
  - Total: 19.08 km^{2} (7.37 sq mi)
- Elevation: 591 m (1,939 ft)

Population (31 August 2022)
  - Total: 293
  - Density: 15.4/km^{2} (39.8/sq mi)
- Demonym: Borgomezzavallesi
- Time zone: UTC+1 (CET)
  - Summer (DST): UTC+2 (CEST)
- Postal code: 28846
- Dialing code: 0324
- ISTAT code: 103078
- Patron saint: St. Mary
- Saint day: 8 September
- Website: Official website

Borgomezzavalle is a comune situated in the Valle Antrona, Province of Verbano-Cusio-Ossola in the Italian region Piedmont. In 2019 the population was 320 and as of 2023 it was 290. Its patron saint is St Mary, whose feast is held on the 8th September.

It was established on 1 January 2016 by the merger of the municipalities of Seppiana and Viganella.

== Coat of Arms ==
The coat of arms and the banner of the municipality of Borgomezzavalle were granted by decree of the President of the Republic of 15 March 2018.

Coat of arms quartered: in the first, a sky blue field, a trapezoidal iron mallet sable, placed dexter, with a long handle gules, placed in band, the end of the handle crossing a water wheel argent, placed sinister, the handle supported centrally by a stone fulcrum gules, this resting on a mass of water azure, billowing argent, in the manner of a plain, the water wheel partly submerged in the water; in the second, vert, a lily or, accompanied by two diminished bands, one at the head, the other at the tip, of the same; in the third, vert, a chestnut vert, fruited with sevens or, stemmed and rooted in the natural way; on the quarter, or, a natural vine, uprooted therefrom, two leaves of vert, the horizontal shoots joined to four bunches of grapes, set in a pale, purple, two to the right, two to the left. External ornaments of the Municipality.

The new emblem incorporates the same elements present in the coats of arms of the municipalities of Seppiana and Viganella. The banner is a white cloth with a blue border.

== Etymology ==
From Borgo, "village" and mezzavalle, "middle valley".

The etymology of Seppiana (Silva Plana) translates to "forest plain"; despite the town being situated on a steep mountainside.

== History ==
A referendum concerning the merger of the municipalities of Seppiana and Viganella was held on June 14, 2015. In Seppiana, 93.94% voted in favour, with a turnout of 67.35%. In Viganella 69.32% voted in favour with a turnout of 74.19%.

=== Seppiana ===
Seppiana grew rich through the profits of its iron mining industry in the Valle Antrona.

The 11th century church of San Ambrogio was expanded in the 12th and 13th centuries meaning it was capable of accommodating a congregation of the whole valley.

From 1571 to 1621, the various communities of Antrona, Schieranco, and Mezzavalle (Viganella) gradually separated, creating their own parishes.

During the 16th and 17th centuries, Seppiana, like the entire Ossola region, was struck by a plague epidemic. Part of the population moved to the mountain pastures, and many survivors made vows and contributed tithe, enabling the transformation of the chapel of San Rocco into a church proper, completed in 1641. The statue of the saint is carried in procession through the town streets every year to coincide with his feast on August 16th.

During WWII, Seppiana and its mountain pastures were the scene of clashes and the organization of resistance movements against the German invasion, culminating in the proclamation of the Republic of Ossola in September 1944. The 83rd Garibaldi Brigade operated in the Antrona Valley notable for its guerrilla warfare. Viganella is the central town of the Antrona Valley, one of the Piedmontese Alpine valleys bordering Switzerland, which constitute the Ossola region. Viganella is notable for its historic town with few modern buildings, situated on a rocky knoll between two small streams.

=== Viganella ===
Viganella's rural architecture is typical of a community of miners and charcoal burners, its historic demographic. The comune is notable in the history of Piedmont for its iron mining with the industry's oldest record dating to 21 July 1217 in which the Bishop of Novara, Oldeberto Torneffi, leased a furnace in Vai Magliasca in the municipality of Viganella to a master smelter. Another example is an 18th-century painting by G. Mattia Borgnis, commissioned as a votive offering by the men of Viganella returning from Haute-Savoie where they had been to learn the trade of miners and smelters.

The parish church dedicated to the Nascent Virgin, dating from 1614, contains sculptures and paintings.

Also of note is a building known as "Casa Vanni", the former home of a local painter and sculptor; as well as a medieval tower, the only "fortified house" in the Valle Antrona.

Prehistoric archaeological remains are also present in the municipality such as megalithic caves, Celtic petroglyphs, 15th-century trilithic arches and the remains of a Roman necropolis where terracotta olps, cups and bronze coins from 156 and 157 AD have been recorded.

Viganella comprises six historic hamlets or villages, each sporting their historic oratories or chapels.

The comune is host to several folk traditions. "Candelora" is celebrated every year on February 2nd with the reintroduction of the "pescia," a fir tree decorated with traditional artisanal and culinary items, and the patronal feast of Santa Maria held on September 8th with accompanying festivities

There is a folk group who dress in traditional alpine clothing and the choir "I cantori di Viganella", who practice Gregorian chant.

== Geography ==
The slope of the valley south of the town of Viganella is included in the Alta Valle Antrona natural park.

=== Towns, Villages and Frazione ===
In addition to the two former municipal capitals, Seppiana and Viganella, the other villages and frazione are:

- In Seppiana: Camblione.
- In Viganella: Bordo, Cheggio, Prato, Rivera, Ruginetta.

The municipality also includes numerous small Alpine hamlets or frazione:

- In Seppiana: Alpe Baldana (shared with Villadossola), Alpe Cascina Nova, Alpe Cima al Prà, Alpe Crotto, Alpe Mandariola Sopra, Alpe Mandariola Sotto, Alpe i Merli, Alpe San Giacomo (shared with Pallanzeno), and Alpe Zii.
- In Viganella: Alpe Baitone, Alpe Barco, Alpe Barco Sotto, Alpe Beola, Alpe Brig, Alpe Casalaccio, Alpe Casale, Alpe Casalvera, Alpe Cavallo, Alpe Erbalunga (mainly in Calasca-Castiglione), Alpe Gora, Alpe Grap, Alpe Gurbegia, Alpe La Piana, Alpe Pianezzo, Alpe Piazzana, Alpe Prei, Alpe Saler.

Borgomezzavalle borders the following municipalities: Antrona Schieranco, Calasca-Castiglione, Montescheno, Pallanzeno, Villadossola.

=== Churches, Chapels & Oratories ===
A number of ecclesiastical landmarks are present in the municipality:

- Church of San Pietro (17th century)
- Parish Church of the Nativity of the Virgin Mary (16th century)
- Oratory of Our Lady of Mount Carmel (in Rivera)
- Oratory of St Anthony (17th century)
- Oratory of St Dominic (17th century) (in Cheggio)
- Oratory of St Julius (17th century)
- Oratory of St Joseph and St Stephen (in Bordo)
- Schieranco Oratory (17th century)
- San Rocco's Oratory
- The Church of San Ambrogio (in Seppiana)
- Chapel to the "Fallen in War, 1915-18"
- Chapel to the "Partisans of Ornavasso"
- Chapel of Mundù
- Riale Chapel
- Chapel of the "Madonna del Bisan"
- Chapel of Our Lady of Sorrows (16th century)
- Chapel of Our Lady of Oropa
- Chapel of Peace (1945)
- Chapel of Ramansciuna
- Chapel of Alpe Alberina
- Chapel of Alpe Brigh
- Chapel of Alpe Cavallo
- Chapel of Asôta
- Chapel of Prato (18th century)
- Chapel of St. Aloysius Gonzaga
- Chapel of St. Peter (19th century)
- Chapel of Scarpi
- Chapel of Terzo
- Ines Chapel
- Circuit of the Chapels
- D'Arvina Chapel

== Demographics ==
Borgomezzavelle has seen a declining trend in its population since the mid 20th century.

Population census of Borgomezzalle

Year	Pop.	±% p.a.
1861	781	—
1871	821	+0.50%
1881	813	−0.10%
1901	736	−0.50%
1911	750	+0.19%
1921	742	−0.11%
1931	718	−0.33%
1936	736	+0.50%

Year	Pop.	±% p.a.
1951	707	−0.27%
1961	714	+0.10%
1971	641	−1.07%
1981	532	−1.85%
1991	414	−2.48%
2001	386	−0.70%
2011	335	−1.41%
2021	292	−1.36%

Note: Seppiana and Viganella were merged in 2016.
Source: ISTAT, Popolazione residente dei comuni. Censimenti dal 1861 al 1991, su ebiblio.istat.it, ISTAT.

In January 2019, in order to reverse the declining population in the village, Alberto Preioni, mayor of Borgomezzavalle, announced a plan to sell abandoned mountain cottages for just €1, (about US$1.20). With the purchase comes the obligation to renovate the building, there is no residency requirement. He also offered to pay families €1,000 for each new baby born in the village and €2,000 to someone starting a new business and who registers for VAT.

== Administration ==
Mayor	Elected	Appointed	Party	Office
Gaetano Losa	1 Jan 2016	6 Jan 2016		Commissario prefettizio
Alberto Preioni	6 Jan 2016	24 July 2019	Lista civica	Sindaco
Stefano Bellotti	22 Sept 2020	Incumbent	Lista civica	Sindaco
