= Federico Baroschi =

Italian politician (1940–2022)

Member of the Regional Council of Sardinia
- In office 17 July 1989 – 18 July 1994

President of the Province of Cagliari
- In office 1985–1988
- Preceded by: Giuseppe Putzolu
- Succeeded by: Walter Piludu

Personal details
- Born: 21 September 1940 Brescia, Kingdom of Italy
- Died: 31 March 2022 (aged 81) Buggerru, Sardinia, Italy
- Party: Italian Socialist Party
- Profession: Engineer

Federico Baroschi (21 September 1940 – 31 March 2022) was an Italian engineer and politician. A member of the Italian Socialist Party, he served as president of the Province of Cagliari from 1985 to 1988 and as a member of the Regional Council of Sardinia from 1989 to 1994.

Born in Brescia, Baroschi moved to Sardinia to work as an engineer, first at the Monteponi mine in Iglesias and later in the industrial area of Portovesme. He also served as regional deputy secretary of the Italian Socialist Party and as a municipal councillor in Iglesias from 1990 to 1993.

From 2016 to 2021, Baroschi served as a municipal councillor in Buggerru on a civic list. He died there on 31 March 2022, aged 81.
