= Massimo Nobili =

Italian politician (born 1958)

President of the Province of Verbano-Cusio-Ossola
- In office 8 June 2009 – 13 October 2014
- Preceded by: Paolo Ravaioli
- Succeeded by: Stefano Costa

Personal details
- Born: 8 September 1958 (age 68) Premosello, Province of Novara, Italy
- Party: Forza Italia; The People of Freedom

Massimo Nobili (born 8 September 1958) is an Italian politician who served as president of the Province of Verbano-Cusio-Ossola from 2009 to 2014.

== Life and career ==
Nobili began his political career as a municipal councillor in Loreglia, serving from 1980 to 1985. He later served as provincial secretary of Forza Italia from 2000 to 2005. He also held several positions in public and private organizations in the Verbano-Cusio-Ossola area, including president of SAIA, Lake Maggiore Technopark and SPL in Omegna.

Nobili was elected president of the Province of Verbano-Cusio-Ossola in 2009, representing a centre-right coalition comprising The People of Freedom, Lega Nord, and two civic lists. He received 57.5% of the vote, defeating incumbent president Paolo Ravaioli, the centre-left candidate. He also served as president of the UPI Piedmont.

On 2 June 2009, he was appointed Commander of the Order of Merit of the Italian Republic.
