= Alessandro Lana =

Italian politician (born 1986)

President of the Province of Verbano-Cusio-Ossola
- In office 22 December 2021 – 20 December 2025
- Preceded by: Arturo Lincio
- Succeeded by: Giandomenico Albertella

Mayor of Piedimulera
- Incumbent
- Assumed office 26 May 2014
- Preceded by: Gian Mauro Bertoia

Personal details
- Born: 20 March 1986 (age 40) Domodossola, Piedmont, Italy

Alessandro Lana (born 20 March 1986) is an Italian politician who served as president of the Province of Verbano-Cusio-Ossola from 2021 to 2025. He has served as mayor of Piedimulera since 2014.

Lana was elected president of the Province of Verbano-Cusio-Ossola as a centre-right candidate in December 2021, defeating Marco Stefanetta, mayor of Vogogna, with 50,819 weighted votes. In March 2025 he also became president of the UPI Piedmont.
