= Pallanzeno =

- Comune
- Comune di Pallanzeno
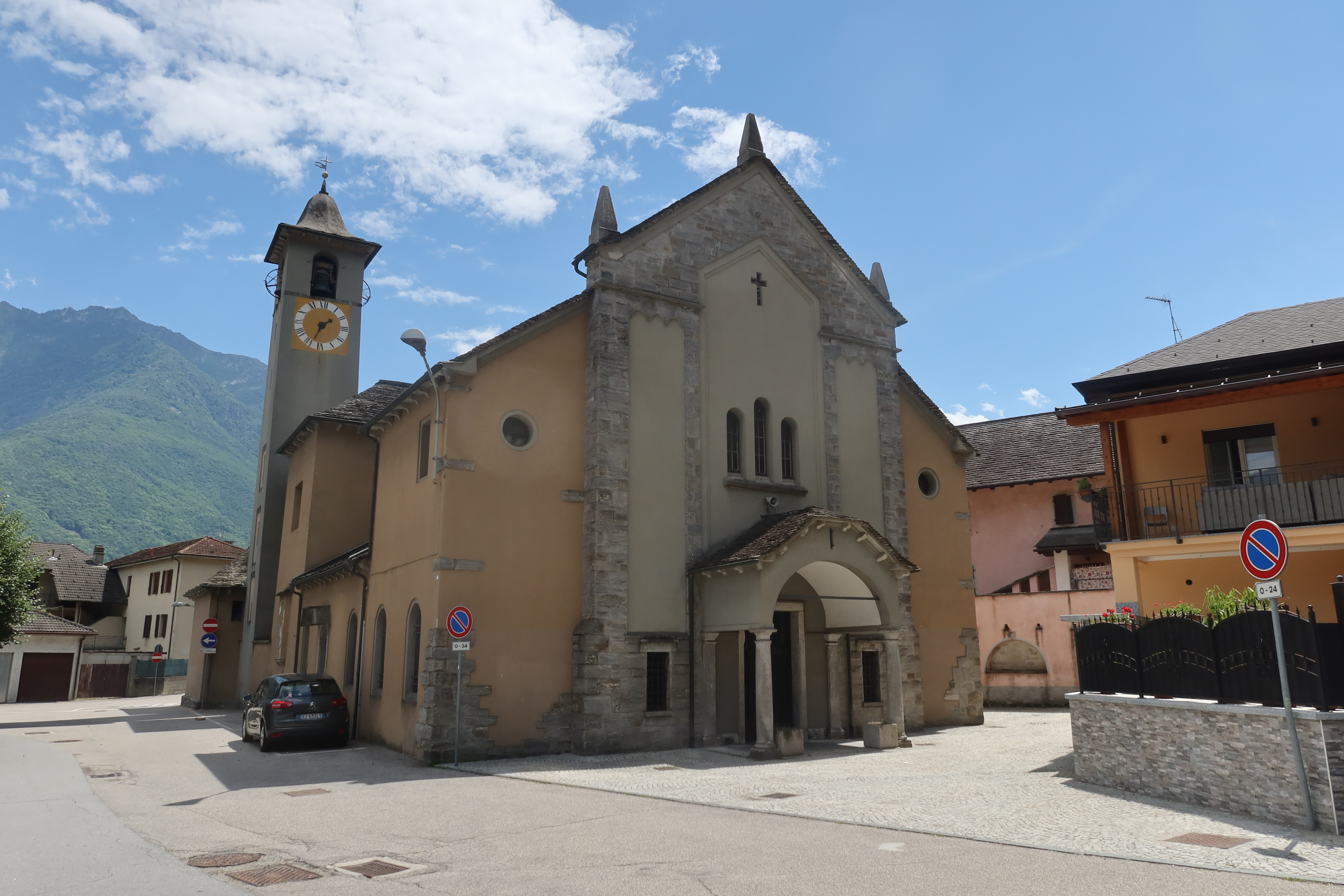

- Location within Italy Location within Piedmont
- Coordinates: 46°3′N 8°16′E
- Country: Italy
- Region: Piedmont
- Province: Province of Verbano-Cusio-Ossola (VB)

Government
  - Mayor: Gianpaolo Blardone

Area
  - Total: 4.37 km^{2} (1.69 sq mi)
- Elevation: 230 m (750 ft)

Population (31 December 2017)
  - Total: 1,136
  - Density: 260/km^{2} (673/sq mi)
- Time zone: UTC+1 (CET)
  - Summer (DST): UTC+2 (CEST)
- Postal code: 28020
- Dialing code: 0324
- Website: Official website

Pallanzeno is a comune (municipality) in the Province of Verbano-Cusio-Ossola in the Italian region Piedmont, located about 120 kilometres (75 mi) northeast of Turin and about 25 kilometres (16 mi) northwest of Verbania.

Pallanzeno borders the following municipalities: Beura-Cardezza, Borgomezzavalle, Calasca-Castiglione, Piedimulera, Villadossola, Vogogna.
