= Eliseo Secci =

Italian politician (born 1948)

Member of the Regional Council of Sardinia
- In office June 2001 – 22 January 2008
- In office 18 July 1994 – 28 June 1999

President of the Province of Cagliari
- In office 26 March 1993 – 7 January 1994
- Preceded by: Francesco Floris
- Succeeded by: Cecilia Contu

Mayor of Decimomannu
- In office 30 November 1998 – 27 May 2003
- In office 1983 – 2 August 1990

Personal details
- Born: 3 June 1948 (age 78) San Nicolò Gerrei, Province of Cagliari, Kingdom of Italy
- Party: Christian Democracy; Italian People's Party; The Daisy
- Profession: Industrial manager

Eliseo Secci (born 3 June 1948) is an Italian industrial manager and politician who served as president of the Province of Cagliari from 1993 to 1994 and as a member of the Regional Council of Sardinia for three legislatures.

== Life and career ==
Secci was born in San Nicolò Gerrei in 1948. He worked as an industrial surveyor at Enichem in Sarroch, where he was responsible for personnel management and development and industrial relations.

He began his political career with Christian Democracy, serving as a municipal councillor and later as mayor of Decimomannu, a position he held from 1983 to 1990. He subsequently elected to the Provincial Council of Cagliari and was president of the province from March to January 1994.

In 1994, following the dissolution of Christian Democracy, Secci joined the Italian People's Party, serving as its regional organizational coordinator. He was elected to the Regional Council of Sardinia during its 11th legislature in the Cagliari constituency with 5,622 preference votes and served as chairman of the Budget Committee. In 1998, he was re-elected mayor of Decimomannu. In 2001, he re-entered the Regional Council as a substitute for Gianfranco Tunis, who had been elected to the Italian Senate.

Secci later joined The Daisy, and was elected to the Regional Council again in the 2004 Sardinian regional election with 4,352 votes. From August 2007, he served as regional assessor for planning, budget and territorial planning.

From 2021 to 2026, Secci served as president of the Sardinian regional committee of the Italian Volleyball Federation (FIPAV).
