= Giuseppe Ravasio =

Italian lawyer and politician (1925–1999)

President of the Province of Verbano-Cusio-Ossola
- In office 8 May 1995 – 31 January 1999
- Preceded by: Office established
- Succeeded by: Ivan Guarducci

Personal details
- Born: 20 November 1925 Gravellona Toce, Province of Novara, Kingdom of Italy
- Died: 31 January 1999 (aged 73) Pallanza, Verbania, Piedmont, Italy
- Party: Christian Democracy; Italian People's Party
- Profession: Lawyer

Giuseppe Ravasio (20 November 1925 – 31 January 1999) was an Italian lawyer and politician who served as the first president of the Province of Verbano-Cusio-Ossola from 1995 until his death in 1999.

== Life and career ==
Ravasio was one of the leading figures of the Christian Democracy in the post-war period in the province of Novara and in Omegna. In 1985, he was elected to the Verbania City Council and from 1986 to 1989 served as municipal assessor for commerce and roads and traffic. In 1990, he became Verbania's first civic ombudsman. He joined the Italian People's Party in 1994.

In the 1995 provincial election, the first presidential election held in the newly established Province of Verbano-Cusio-Ossola, Ravasio ran as the candidate of a centre-left coalition supported by the Populars, the Democratic Party of the Left, and the Pact of Democrats. He finished second in the first round with 31.42% of the vote, behind centre-right candidate Gianmauro Mottini, who received 39.36%. At the runoff, Ravasio won with 50.92% of the vote, becoming the province's first president.

Ravasio died suddenly of cardiac arrest at his home in Pallanza, Verbania, on 31 January 1999, aged 73.
