= Giandomenico Albertella =

Italian politician

President of the Province of Verbano-Cusio-Ossola
- Incumbent
- Assumed office 21 December 2025
- Preceded by: Alessandro Lana

Mayor of Verbania
- Incumbent
- Assumed office 25 June 2024
- Preceded by: Silvia Marchionini

Mayor of Cannobio
- In office 8 June 2009 – 26 May 2019
- Preceded by: Antonello Viviano
- Succeeded by: Gianmaria Minazzi
- In office 12 June 1985 – 8 March 1988
- Preceded by: Guido Fumagalli
- Succeeded by: Mario Grassi

Personal details
- Born: 25 August 1958 (age 68) Cannobio, then Province of Novara, Italy
- Party: Independent (centre-right)
- Education: Polytechnic University of Milan
- Profession: Architect

Giandomenico Albertella (born 25 August 1958) is an Italian politician who has served as mayor of Verbania since June 2024 and president of the Province of Verbano-Cusio-Ossola since December 2025.

== Life and career ==
Born in Cannobio, Albertella earned a degree in architecture from the Polytechnic University of Milan in 1982 and pursued a political career alongside his professional activity as an architect. He began his political activity within the Italian Socialist Party, in which he remained until 1994, before joining Italian Renewal, where he was active until 2002.

He served as mayor of Cannobio from 1985 to 1988 and as a member of the Provincial Council of Novara from 1985 to 1995. From 1988 to 1993, he held the office of provincial assessor, and subsequently served as vice president of the province of Novara until May 1995.

In the mid-1990s, the Mani pulite scandals slowed Albertella's political career, partly due to the involvement of his political mentor, Cornelio Masciadri. After an unsuccessful 1995 mayoral bid in Cannobio, he returned to local politics in 2004 as a centre-right municipal assessor until 2009.

From 2009 to 2019, he again held the office of mayor of Cannobio for two consecutive terms.

In 2019, Albertella ran as an independent for mayor of Verbania with the support of the centre-right coalition, but was defeated in the second round by the incumbent mayor Silvia Marchionini. He ran again in 2024 as a centre-right independent candidate and was elected at the runoff with 51,86% of the votes.

Albertella was elected president of the Province of Verbano-Cusio-Ossola following the 2025 provincial elections, defeating the centre-left candidate Enrico Barbazza, mayor of Malesco. Albertella obtained 56.7% of the weighted vote (44,748 points), compared with 43.3% (34,218 points) for Barbazza.

Political offices
Preceded by Silvia Marchionini	Mayor of Verbania; 2024–present	Succeeded by
