= Gianluca Festa (politician) =

Italian politician

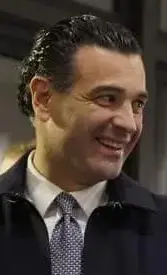
- Festa in 2024

Mayor of Avellino
- In office 28 June 2019 – 16 April 2024
- Preceded by: Vincenzo Ciampi
- Succeeded by: Laura Nargi

Personal details
- Born: 13 August 1974 (age 52) Avellino, Campania, Italy
- Party: Independent
- Education: University of Sannio
- Profession: employee, basketball player

Gianluca Festa
S.S. Felice Scandone
- League: Serie A

Personal information
- Born: 13 August 1974 (age 52) Avellino, Italy
- Listed height: 6 ft 1 in (1.85 m)
- Listed weight: 207 lb (94 kg)

Career information
- High school: University of Sannio
- Playing career: 1999–2001
- Number: 99

Career history
- 1999–2001: S.S. Felice Scandone

Gianluca Festa (born 13 August 1974 in Avellino) is an Italian politician and former professional basketball player.

He played the role of shooting guard for the S.S. Felice Scandone for the season '99-'00 scoring 2 points in a single match and again in the season '00-'01 scoring a maximum of 2 points in a single match.

Festa ran as an independent for the office of Mayor of Avellino at the 2019 local elections, supported by a coalition formed by centre-left and civic parties. He was elected on 9 June and took office on 28 June 2019. Festa was subject to a large amount of attention from the media on 31 May 2020 when he gathered with local youth in a main street of his city to chant controversial songs against the city of Salerno, despite the social distancing restrictions in place due to the COVID-19 pandemic.

== See also ==
- 2019 Italian local elections
- List of mayors of Avellino

Political offices
Preceded by Vincenzo Ciampi	Mayor of Avellino; 2019–2024	Succeeded by TBE
