= Paolo Foti =

Italian politician

Mayor of Avellino
- In office 11 June 2013 – 12 July 2018
- Preceded by: Giuseppe Galasso
- Succeeded by: Vincenzo Ciampi

Personal details
- Born: 12 August 1949 (age 77) Agira, Sicily, Italy
- Party: Democratic Party
- Education: University of Naples Federico II
- Profession: manager

Paolo Foti (born 12 August 1949 in Agira) is an Italian politician.

He is a member of the Democratic Party and was elected Mayor of Avellino on 8 June 2013 and took office on 11 June. He served as mayor until 12 July 2018.

== See also ==
- 2013 Italian local elections
- List of mayors of Avellino

Political offices
Preceded by Giuseppe Galasso	Mayor of Avellino; 2013–2018	Succeeded by Vincenzo Ciampi
