= 1999 Italian local elections =

The 1999 Italian local elections were held on 13 June (with runoffs on 27 June).

In Sicily the elections were held on 28 November (with runoffs on 12 December), while in Trentino the elections were held on 16 May (with runoffs on 30 May).

The elections were overall won by the centre-left alliance The Olive Tree, with 21 municipalities won out of 32 and 46 provinces won out of 67.

The first round of June elections were held on the same day of the 1999 European Parliament election.

== Voting system ==
The semipresidential voting system was the one used for all mayoral elections in Italy of cities with a population higher than 15,000. Under this system voters express a direct choice for the mayor or an indirect choice voting for the party of the candidate's coalition. If no candidate receives at least 50% of votes, the top two candidates go to a run-off after two weeks. The winning candidate obtains a majority bonus equal to 60% of seats in the City Council. During the first round, if no candidate gets more than 50% of votes but a coalition of lists gets the majority of 50% of votes or if the mayor is elected in the first round but its coalition gets less than 40% of the valid votes, the majority bonus cannot be assigned to the coalition of the winning mayor candidate.

The election of the City Council is based on a direct choice for the candidate with a preference vote: the candidate with the majority of the preferences is elected. The number of the seats for each losing party is determined proportionally, using D'Hondt seat allocation. Only coalitions with more than 3% of votes are eligible to get any seats.

== Municipal elections ==
=== Mayoral election results ===
Centre-left coalition (The Olive Tree)
Centre-right coalition (Pole for Freedoms)
Union of Democrats for Europe (UDEUR)

Region	City	Incumbent mayor	Elected mayor	1st round		2nd round		Seats	Source
Region	City	Incumbent mayor	Elected mayor	Votes	%	Votes	%	Seats	Source
May elections
Trentino-Alto Adige	Trento	Lorenzo Dellai (PPI)	Alberto Pacher (DS)	42,675	69.33	—	—	34 / 49	
June elections
Piedmont	Biella	Gianluca Susta (PPI)	Gianluca Susta (PPI)	11,498	42.35	11,895	51.73	24 / 40	
Piedmont	Verbania	Aldo Reschigna (DS)	Aldo Reschigna (DS)	7,953	42.17	8,430	53.92	24 / 40	
Piedmont	Vercelli	Gabriele Bagnasco (FdV)	Gabriele Bagnasco (FdV)	7,293	23.93	13,277	52.29	24 / 40	
Lombardy	Bergamo	Guido Vicentini (PPI)	Cesare Veneziani (CCD)	28,737	40.31	29,731	57.76	24 / 40	
Lombardy	Cremona	Paolo Bodini (DS)	Paolo Bodini (DS)	23,216	50.03	—	—	24 / 40	
Veneto	Padua	Flavio Zanonato (DS)	Giustina Mistrello Destro (FI)	54,340	42.22	57,047	50.55	24 / 40	
Liguria	Imperia	Davide Berio (DS)	Luigi Sappa (FI)	15,643	59.50	—	—	26 / 40	
Emilia-Romagna	Bologna	Walter Vitali (DS)	Giorgio Guazzaloca (Ind)	104,565	41.53	113,462	50.69	28 / 46	
Emilia-Romagna	Ferrara	Roberto Soffritti (DS)	Gaetano Sateriale (DS)	50,046	54.56	—	—	25 / 40	
Emilia-Romagna	Forlì	Franco Rusticali (DS)	Franco Rusticali (DS)	39,927	56.64	—	—	25 / 40	
Emilia-Romagna	Modena	Giuliano Barbolini (DS)	Giuliano Barbolini (DS)	59,144	53.25	—	—	24 / 40	
Emilia-Romagna	Reggio Emilia	Antonella Spaggiari (DS)	Antonella Spaggiari (DS)	55,222	62.28	—	—	26 / 40	
Emilia-Romagna	Rimini	Giuseppe Chicchi (DS)	Alberto Ravaioli (PPI)	39,886	49.27	31,304	51.36	24 / 40	
Tuscany	Arezzo	Paolo Ricci (PPI)	Luigi Lucherini (FI)	23,390	43.96	22,776	51.43	24 / 40	
Tuscany	Florence	Mario Primicerio (Ind)	Leonardo Domenici (DS)	108,424	51.65	—	—	28 / 46	
Tuscany	Livorno	Gianfranco Lamberti (DS)	Gianfranco Lamberti (DS)	54,402	58.74	—	—	26 / 40	
Tuscany	Prato	Fabrizio Mattei (DS)	Fabrizio Mattei (DS)	50,826	54.65	—	—	24 / 40	
Umbria	Perugia	Gianfranco Maddoli (Ind)	Renato Locchi (DS)	53,580	58.54	—	—	25 / 40	
Umbria	Terni	Gianfranco Ciaurro (FI)	Paolo Raffaelli (DS)	36,647	53.86	—	—	24 / 40	
Marche	Ascoli Piceno	Roberto Allevi (DS)	Piero Celani (FI)	17,547	52.73	—	—	24 / 40	
Marche	Pesaro	Oriano Giovanelli (DS)	Oriano Giovanelli (DS)	30,749	55.02	—	—	24 / 40	
Marche	Urbino	Massimo Galuzzi (DS)	Massimo Galuzzi (DS)	6,812	71.61	—	—	15 / 20	
Lazio	Viterbo	Marcello Meroi (AN)	Giancarlo Gabbianelli (AN)	20,893	53.10	—	—	24 / 40	
Abruzzo	Teramo	Angelo Sperandio (Ind)	Angelo Sperandio (Ind)	19,387	53.73	—	—	24 / 40	
Molise	Campobasso	Augusto Massa (DS)	Augusto Massa (DS)	18,539	58.97	—	—	24 / 40	
Campania	Avellino	Antonio Di Nunno (PPI)	Antonio Di Nunno (PPI)	16,357	47.35	16,404	68.39	24 / 40	
Apulia	Bari	Simeone Di Cagno Abbrescia (FI)	Simeone Di Cagno Abbrescia (FI)	103,369	54.15	—	—	28 / 46	
Apulia	Foggia	Paolo Agostinacchio (AN)	Paolo Agostinacchio (AN)	47,201	52.54	—	—	24 / 40	
Basilicata	Potenza	Domenico Potenza (DS)	Gaetano Fierro (UDEUR)	10,811	24.87	19,473	51.83	7 / 40	
November elections
Sicily	Caltanissetta	Stefano Agliata (Note: Prefectural commissioner.)	Salvatore Messana (Ind)	14,483	39.36	15,879	53.24	17 / 30	
Sicily	Syracuse	Vincenzo Dell'Arte (PPI)	Giambattista Bufardeci (FI)	27,070	44.73	30,906	73.58	17 / 40	
