= Silvia Marchionini =

Italian politician

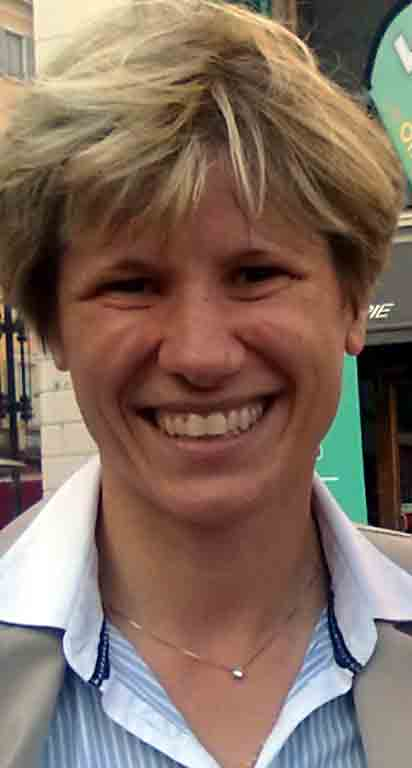

Mayor of Verbania
- In office 9 June 2014 – 26 June 2024
- Preceded by: Marco Zacchera
- Succeeded by: Giandomenico Albertella

Personal details
- Born: 16 July 1975 (age 50) Verbania, Piedmont, Italy
- Party: Democratic Party
- Profession: Teacher

Silvia Marchionini (born 16 July 1975) is an Italian politician.

She is a member of the Democratic Party and served as mayor of the town of Cossogno from 2004 to 2014. She was elected Mayor of Verbania on 8 June 2014 and took office on 9 June. She was re-elected for a second term at the 2019 elections.

== See also ==
- 2014 Italian local elections
- 2019 Italian local elections
- List of mayors of Verbania

Political offices
Preceded by Marco Zacchera	Mayor of Verbania; 2014-2024	Succeeded by Giandomenico Albertella
