= Viganella =

Italian comune

- Frazione
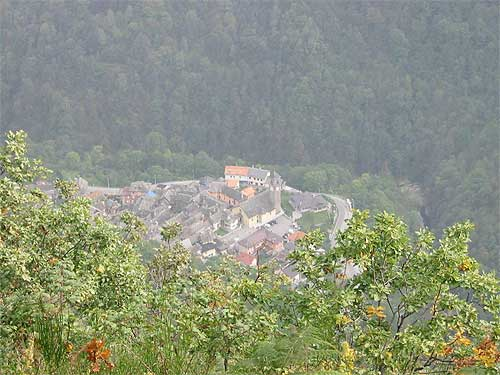
- Viganella in 2005.

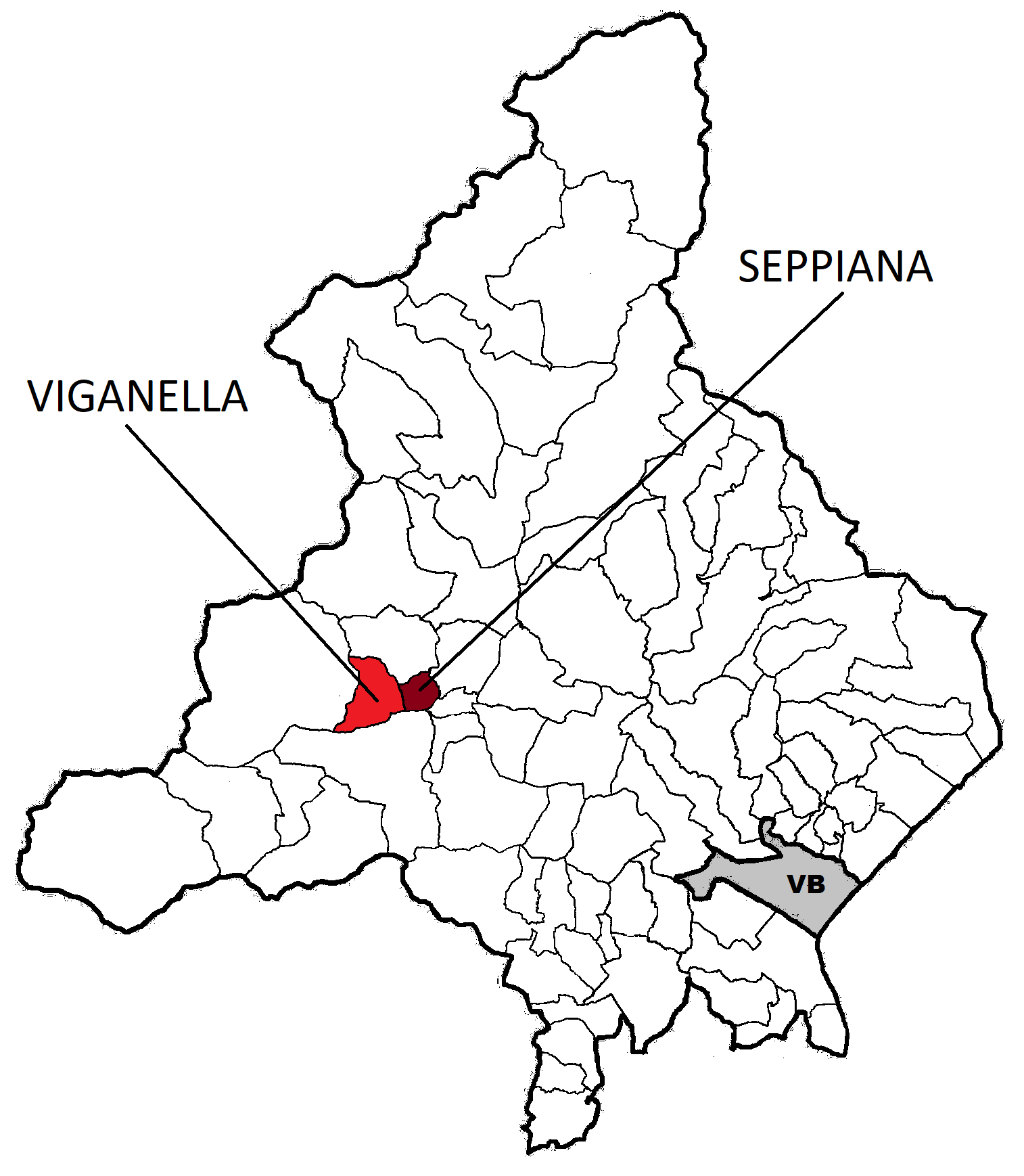

- Location of Viganella in Italy
- Coordinates: 46°03′08″N 8°11′38″E
- Country: Italy
- Region: Piedmont
- Province: Verbano-Cusio-Ossola
- Comune: Borgomezzavalle

Area
  - Total: 13.67 km^{2} (5.28 sq mi)
- Elevation: 582 m (1,909 ft)

Population (31-12-2010)
  - Total: 204
  - Density: 14.9/km^{2} (38.7/sq mi)
- Demonym: Viganellesi
- Time zone: UTC+1 (CET)
  - Summer (DST): UTC+2 (CEST)
- Postal code: 28846 (già 28841)
- Dialing code: 0324
- Website: https://www.comune.borgomezzavalle.vb.it/en-us/home

Viganella is a frazione of Borgomezzavalle, a comune of the Valle Antrona in the Province of Verbano-Cusio-Ossola, the Italian region Piedmont. It is located about 120 kilometres (75 mi) northeast of Turin and about 30 kilometres (19 mi) northwest of Verbania. It was a separate comune until 2016, when it was merged with Seppiana into the municipality of Borgomezzavalle.

== Etymology ==
One hypothesis traces the name Viganella back to vignanella ("small vineyard"), but other studies derive it from vicana with reference to the common lands (of the "vicinia") of the rural settlements of the medieval times.

== Heraldry ==
The municipal coat of arms was granted by decree of the President of the Republic on November 27, 2002. The elements depicted symbolize the main local economic activities: a hydraulically powered hammer recalls ironworking, documented since the 13th century; a vine represents winemaking, which was widespread, especially in the past. The vine is also a reference to the toponym, which sounds similar to vignanella ("small vineyard"), which is among the hypotheses for the etymology of the town's name. The banner was a red flag.

== History ==
Viganella's rural architecture is typical of a community of miners and charcoal burners, its historic demographic. The comune is notable in the history of Piedmont for its iron mining with the industry's oldest record dating to 21 July 1217 in which the Bishop of Novara, Oldeberto Torneffi, leased a furnace in Vai Magliasca in the municipality of Viganella to a master smelter. Another example is an 18th-century painting by G. Mattia Borgnis, commissioned as a votive offering by the men of Viganella returning from Haute-Savoie where they had been to learn the trade of miners and smelters.

The parish church dedicated to the Nascent Virgin, dating from 1614, contains sculptures and paintings.

Also of note is a building known as "Casa Vanni", the former home of a local painter and sculptor; as well as a medieval tower, the only "fortified house" in the Valle Antrona.

Prehistoric archaeological remains are also present in the municipality such as megalithic caves, Celtic petroglyphs, 15th-century trilithic arches and the remains of a Roman necropolis where terracotta olps, cups and bronze coins from 156 and 157 AD have been recorded.

Viganella comprises six historic hamlets or villages, each sporting their historic oratories or chapels.

The comune is host to several folk traditions. "Candelora" is celebrated every year on February 2nd with the reintroduction of the "pescia," a fir tree decorated with traditional artisanal and culinary items, and the patronal feast of Santa Maria held on September 8th with accompanying festivities

There is a folk group who dress in traditional alpine clothing and the choir "I cantori di Viganella", who practice Gregorian chant.

== Notable places ==
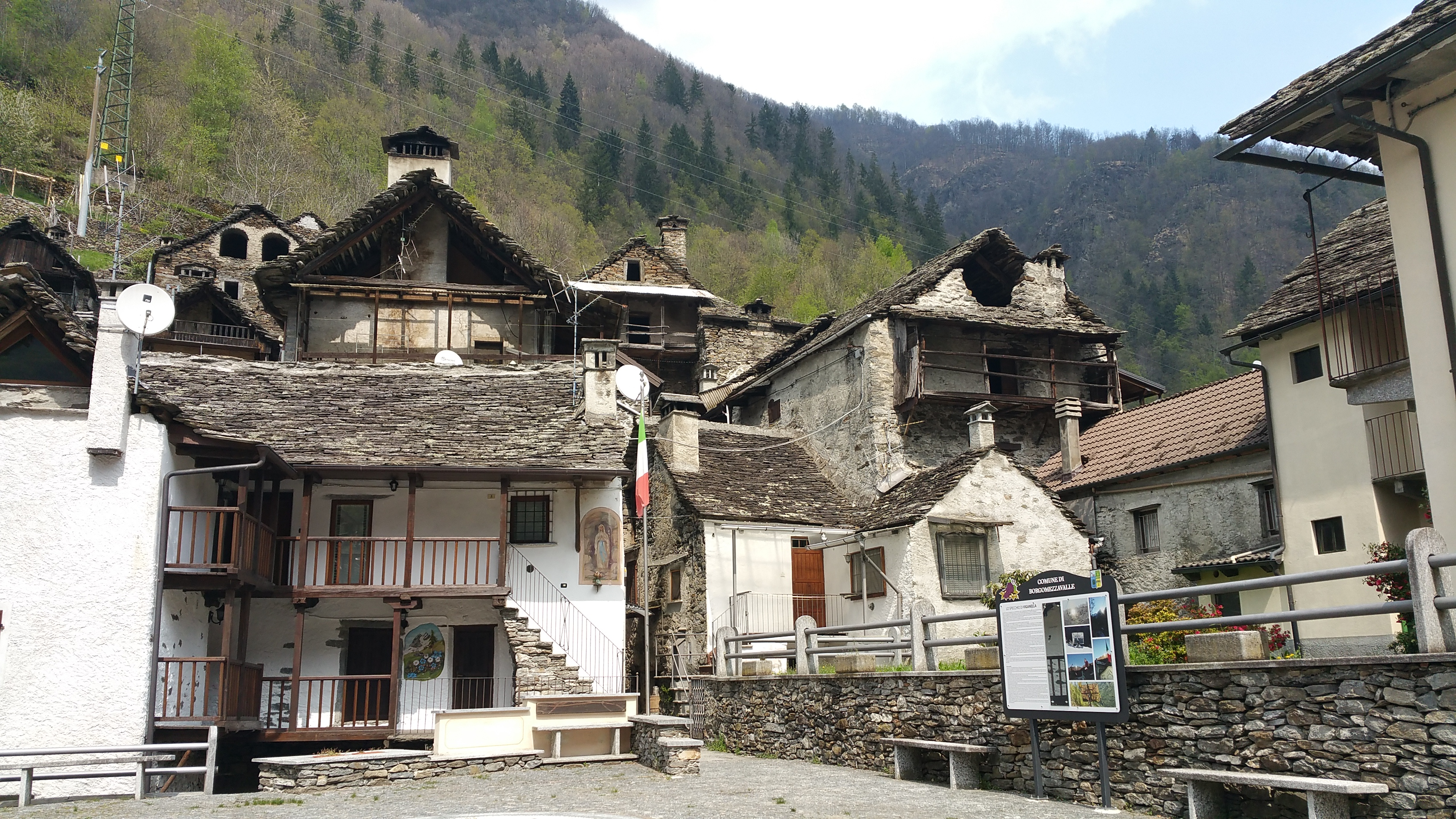
Viganella Square.

The center of Viganella is home to the 16th-century parish church of the Nativity of the Virgin Mary and several ancient buildings of interesting architecture. Numerous chapels and oratories are found throughout the municipality, including the 17th-century buildings of San Domenico and San Giulio.

The Colma (dei Prei) mountain hut in located the Antrona Valley at 1,570 m above sea level and sleeps 12.

== Winter lighting ==
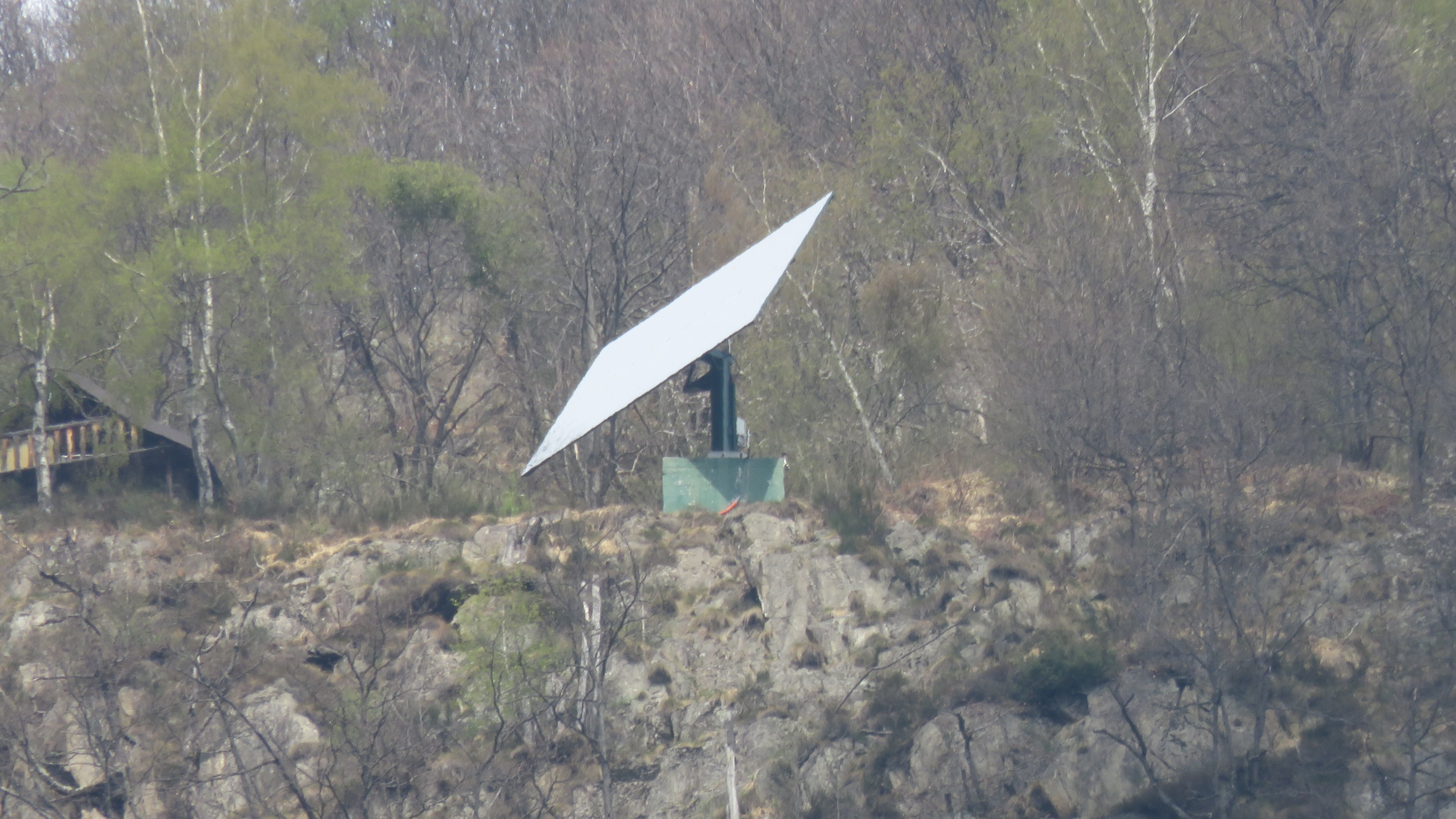
The mirror of Viganella.

Due to the high ridge to the south, the town remains shadowed for 83 days per year, between 11 November and 2 February. A giant mirror was set up in December 2006 with controlled orientation above the mountainside at 1100 on the Alpe Scagiola, consisting of 14 sheets of steel which together are 8 metres (26 ft) wide and 5 metres (16 ft) high. The mirror functions as a heliostat, tracking the Sun so that sunlight always reflects onto the town square. The mirror cost €100,000, or approximately €540 per resident.

The town was featured in a 2009 Italian/Canadian film called Lo Specchio (The Mirror), as well as the 2019 Italian film C'è tempo.

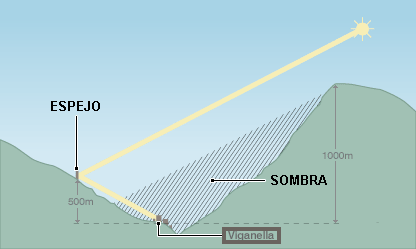
Schematic describing how the mirror illuminates Viganella.

According to a former mayor: "The idea behind the project doesn't have a scientific basis, but a human one. It comes from a desire to let people socialise in winter when the town shuts down due to the cold and the dark."

== Settlements ==
The municipality included four frazioni or hamlets:

- Bordo
- Cheggio
- Prato
- Rivera
- Ruginetta.

It also included the small Alpine villages (località) of Alpe Baitone, Alpe Barco, Alpe Barco Sotto, Alpe Beola, Alpe Brig, Alpe Casalaccio, Alpe Casale, Alpe Casalvera, Alpe Cavallo, Alpe Erbalunga (mainly in Calasca-Castiglione), Alpe Gora, Alpe Grap, Alpe Gurbegia, Alpe La Piana, Alpe Pianezzo, Alpe Piazzana, Alpe Prei, and Alpe Saler.

== Demographics ==
According to ISTAT data, as of December 31, 2010, the resident foreign population was 54. The most represented nationalities based on their percentage of the total resident population were:

- Germany: 44 (21.57%)
- Switzerland: 5 (2.45%)

== Population ==
From the population census:

Population census of Viganella

Year	Pop.	±% p.a.
1861	471	—
1871	499	+0.58%
1881	502	+0.06%
1901	438	−0.68%
1911	484	+1.00%
1921	456	−0.59%
1931	422	−0.77%
1936	426	+0.19%

Year	Pop.	±% p.a.
1951	367	−0.99%
1961	367	+0.00%
1971	332	−1.00%
1981	263	−2.30%
1991	192	−3.10%
2001	204	+0.61%
2011	174	−1.58%

Note: Seppiana and Viganella were merged in 2016 to form Borgomezzavalle.
Source: ISTAT, Popolazione residente dei comuni. Censimenti dal 1861 al 1991, su ebiblio.istat.it, ISTAT.

== See also ==
- Rjukan, a town in Norway also uses mirrors to illuminate the town.
