= Francesco Floris =

Italian historian and politician (1939–2014)

President of the Province of Cagliari
- In office 8 August 1990 – 26 March 1993
- Preceded by: Walter Piludu
- Succeeded by: Eliseo Secci

Personal details
- Born: 24 July 1939 Cagliari, Kingdom of Italy
- Died: 12 November 2014 (aged 75) Cagliari, Sardinia, Italy
- Party: Christian Democracy
- Profession: Teacher, historian

Francesco Floris (24 July 1939 – 12 November 2014) was an Italian politician and historian. A member of Christian Democracy, he served as president of the Province of Cagliari from 1990 to 1993.

Floris graduated in law in 1962 and taught history and philosophy in several Sardinian secondary schools. In 1983 he became a school principal and subsequently headed the "Siotto Pintor" Classical High School in Cagliari, where he remained until his retirement in 2006.

He was also a historian of Sardinia, publishing numerous works on the island's history, nobility and genealogy, including Breve storia della Sardegna (1994), Feudi e feudatari in Sardegna (1996) and Storia della Sardegna (2007).
