= Arturo Lincio =

Italian politician (born 1949)

President of the Province of Verbano-Cusio-Ossola
- In office 1 November 2018 – 21 October 2021
- Preceded by: Stefano Costa
- Succeeded by: Alessandro Lana

Mayor of Trasquera
- In office 5 June 2016 – 4 October 2021
- Preceded by: Gianfranco Baudin
- Succeeded by: Geremia Magliocco
- In office 14 May 2001 – 15 May 2011
- Preceded by: Geremia Magliocco
- Succeeded by: Geremia Magliocco

Personal details
- Born: Arturo Carlo Lincio; 21 March 1949 (age 77) Domodossola, Province of Novara, Italy
- Education: University of Turin
- Profession: Teacher

Arturo Carlo Lincio (born 21 March 1949) is an Italian politician who served as president of the Province of Verbano-Cusio-Ossola from 2018 to 2021. He also served as mayor of Trasquera.

Lincio was elected president of the Province of Verbano-Cusio-Ossola in November 2018 as a centre-right candidate, defeating Maria Rosa Gnocchi, the centre-left candidate, with 54.08% of the weighted vote. His tenure as president ended in October 2021.
