= Walter Piludu =

Italian politician

President of the Province of Cagliari
- In office 1988–1990
- Preceded by: Federico Baroschi
- Succeeded by: Francesco Floris

Personal details
- Born: 15 June 1950 Milan, Italy
- Died: 3 November 2016 (aged 66) Cagliari, Italy
- Party: Italian Communist Party
- Occupation: Politician

Walter Piludu (15 June 1950 – 3 November 2016) was an Italian politician for the Italian Communist Party (PCI).

A public administrator in the eighties and nineties, he was also a militant, and a local leader of the Italian Communist Party from 1971 to the early nineties. He was born in Milan in 1950 but moved to Cagliari in 1964, and in 1971 he joined the PCI helping to form the "Karl Marx" University of where he was then secretary from 1972 to 1974. He directed the youth organization of the party (the FGCI), and between 1976 and 1979 he was the first secretary of the federation of Cagliari and then regional secretary of Sardinia. A PCI political official, as part of the secretariat of the Cagliari Federation Party, between 1979 and 1985 he held several political responsibilities..

Elected in 1985 to the Province of Cagliari, he was, for three years, the commissioner of Public Works, and, from 1988 to 1990, president of the province. In November 1989, he was among the first and very few local leaders of the PCI to line up against the so-called Bolognina Breakthrough, promoted by Achille Occhetto to change the party name: of the political struggle in Sardinia, Piludu was one of the main leaders.

In January 1991, after the transformation of the PCI to the Democratic Party of the Left, despite being a staunch supporter of political Enrico Berlinguer and being strongly influenced by the lessons of Giorgio Amendola, he decided not to join the PDS and engaged in moving first and then in the Communist Refoundation Party, of which he was the regional coordinator from February 1991 to May 1992. In January 1994, he announced his departure from the party he had helped found. Even still, until 1995, his institutional commitment to advisor to the Province of Cagliari at the helm of the "Communist Independent Group" and even still remained tied to the reasons of reformist left, albeit he never aligned himself with any party.

From 2011 to his death in 2016, he lived with ALS. In 2015 he was interviewed by the television program Le Iene on the theme of euthanasia.

In the month of June 2015 he published the book Il Cugino Comunista - Viaggio al termine della vita, written by Walter with his cousin Carlo Piludu. Piludu died on 3 November 2016 at the age of 66.

== Work ==
- Il Cugino Comunista - Viaggio al termine della vita, con Carlo Piludu, Cagliari, CUEC, 2015, ISBN 978-88-8467-928-4.
