= Piedimulera =

- Comune
- Comune di Piedimulera
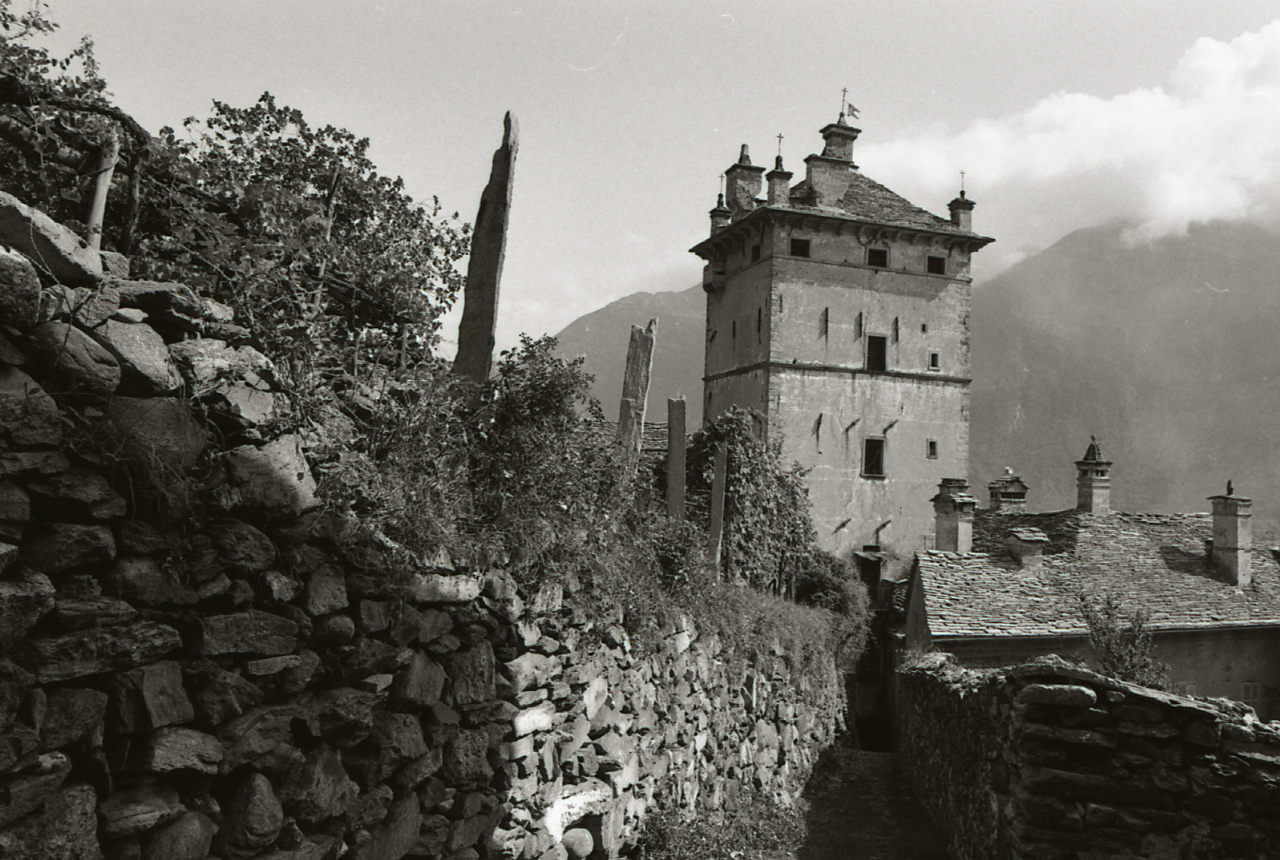

- Location within Italy Location within Piedmont
- Coordinates: 46°1′N 8°16′E
- Country: Italy
- Region: Piedmont
- Province: Verbano-Cusio-Ossola (VB)
- Frazioni: Aprì, Catarnallo, Cimamulera, Colletto, Crosa, Gozzi Sopra, Gozzi Sotto, La Piana, Madonna, Meggiana, Mezzamulera, Morlongo, Pairazzi, San Giuseppe

Government
  - Mayor: Alessandro Lana

Area
  - Total: 7.57 km^{2} (2.92 sq mi)
- Elevation: 247 m (810 ft)

Population (14 October 2016)
  - Total: 1,522
  - Density: 201/km^{2} (521/sq mi)
- Demonym: Piedimuleresi
- Time zone: UTC+1 (CET)
  - Summer (DST): UTC+2 (CEST)
- Postal code: 28885
- Dialing code: 0324
- Website: Official website

Piedimulera is a comune (municipality) in the Province of Verbano-Cusio-Ossola in the Italian region of Piedmont, located about 110 kilometres (68 mi) northeast of Turin and about 25 kilometres (16 mi) northwest of Verbania. Piedimulera is described as a village located on the left bank of the river Anza, at the foot of the mountain, called Mulera.

Piedimulera borders the following municipalities: Calasca-Castiglione, Pallanzeno, Pieve Vergonte, Vogogna, Seppiana.
