= List of mayors of Verbania =

Mayor of Verbania
- Sindaco di Verbania
- Incumbent; Giandomenico Albertella since 26 June 2024
- Appointer: Popular election
- Term length: 5 years, renewable once
- Website: Official website

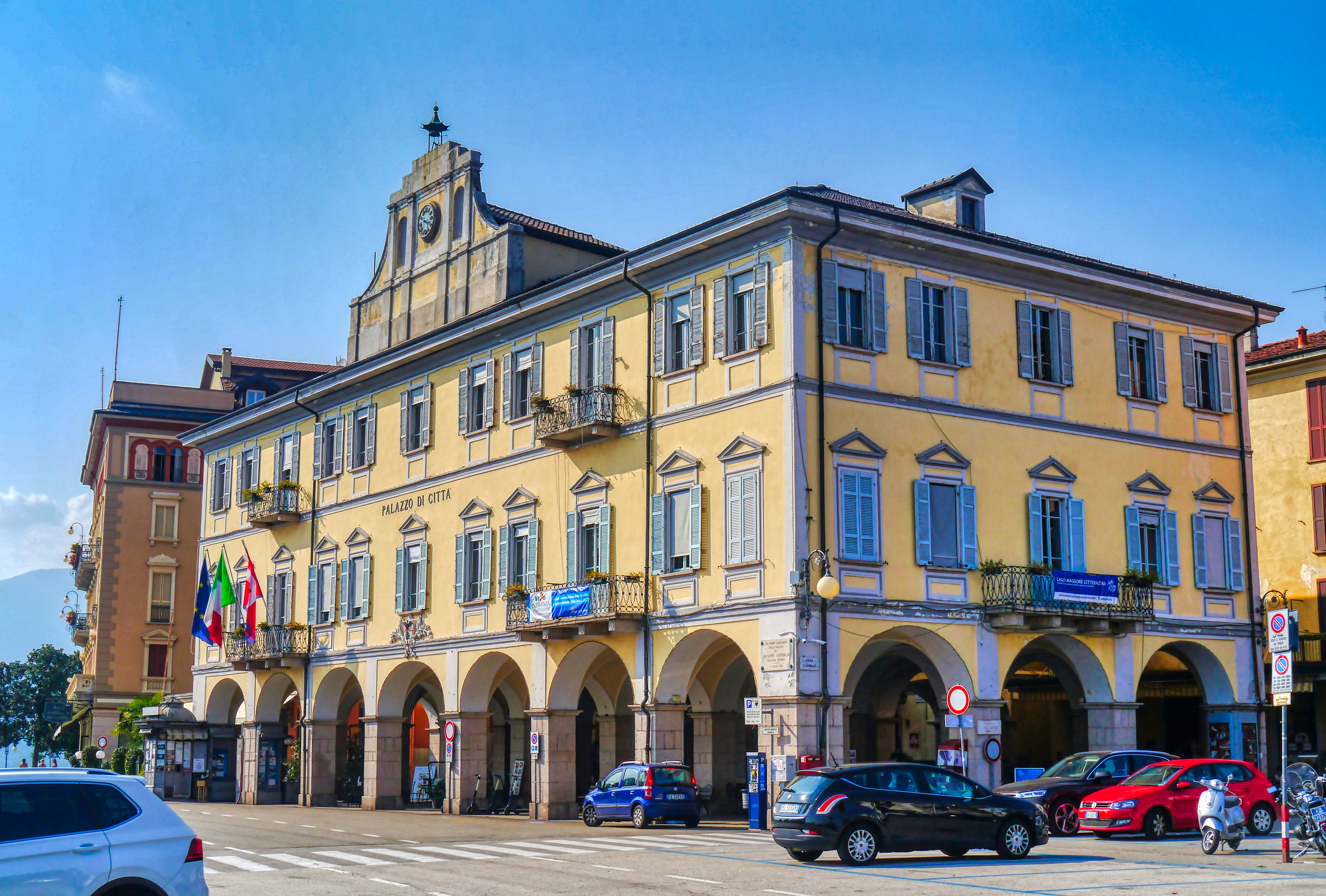
Palazzo di Città is the seat of the Mayor of Verbania.

The Mayor of Verbania is an elected politician who, along with Verbania's City Council, is accountable for the strategic government of Verbania in Piedmont, Italy.

The current mayor is Giandomenico Albertella, an independent, who took office on 26 June 2024.

== Overview ==
According to the Italian Constitution, the Mayor of Verbania is a member of the City Council.

The Mayor is elected by the people of Verbania, who also elect the members of the City Council, controlling the Mayor's policy guidelines and is able to enforce his resignation by a motion of no confidence. The Mayor is entitled to appoint and release the members of his government.

Since 1995 the Mayor has been elected directly by Verbania's electorate: in all mayoral elections in Italy in cities with a population higher than 15,000, the voters express a direct choice for the mayor or an indirect choice voting for the party of the candidate's coalition. If no candidate receives at least 50% of votes, the top two candidates go to a second round after two weeks. The election of the City Council is based on a direct choice for the candidate with a preference vote: the candidate with the majority of the preferences is elected. The number of seats for each party is determined proportionally.

== Kingdom of Italy (1861–1946) ==
The city of Verbania was founded in 1939 and was ruled by an authoritarian Podestà chosen by the National Fascist Party. The office of Mayor of Verbania was created in 1945 during the Allied occupation.

	Mayor	Term start	Term end	Party
Fascist Podestà (1939–1944)
–	Domenico Campanelli (Note: Prefectural Commissioner.)	1939	1941	PNF
1	Ernesto Pirola	1941	1944	PNF
2	Enrico Alberini	1944	1945	PFR
Allied occupation (1944–1945)
1	Vincenzo Andreani (Note: Appointed by the National Liberation Committee.)	1945	1946	PSI

== Italian Republic (since 1946) ==
=== City Council election (1946-1995) ===
From 1946 to 1995, the Mayor of Verbania was elected by the City Council.

	Mayor	Term start	Term end	Party
1	Luigi Zappelli	1946	1948	PSI
2	Giuseppe Perin	1948	1949	PSI
3	Edoardo Cometti	1949	1951	PSI
4	Ugo Sironi	1951	1964	PSI
5	Stefano Ammenti	1964	1970	PSI
(4)	Ugo Sironi	1970	1971	PSI
6	Pietro Mazzola	1971	1974	PCI
7	Francesco Imperiale	1974	1978	PSI
8	Giovanni Motetta	1978	1979	PCI
(6)	Pietro Mazzola	1979	1980	PCI
9	Giacomo Ramoni	1980	1985	PSI
(7)	Francesco Imperiale	1985	1990	PSI
10	Bartolomeo Zani	1990	1993	PSI
11	Aldo Reschigna	1993	1995	PDS

=== Direct election (since 1995) ===
Since 1995, under provisions of new local administration law, the Mayor of Verbania is chosen by direct election, originally every four, than every five years.

	Mayor	Term start	Term end	Party	Coalition	Election
11	Aldo Reschigna	8 May 1995	28 June 1999	PDS; DS	PDS • PPI	1995
11	Aldo Reschigna	28 June 1999	14 June 2004	PDS; DS	DS • PPI • PdCI • SDI	1999
12	Claudio Zanotti	14 June 2004	8 June 2009	PD	DS • DL • PRC • SDI	2004
13	Marco Zacchera	8 June 2009	30 April 2013 (Note: Resigned.)	PdL	PdL • LN • UDC	2009
Special Prefectural Commissioner tenure (30 April 2013 – 9 June 2014)
14	Silvia Marchionini	9 June 2014	12 June 2019	PD	PD • SEL	2014
14	Silvia Marchionini	12 June 2019	26 June 2024	PD	PD	2019
15	Giandomenico Albertella	26 June 2024	Incumbent	Ind	Ind	2024
