= Paolo Ravaioli =

Italian politician (born 1947)

President of the Province of Verbano-Cusio-Ossola
- In office 28 June 2004 – 8 June 2009
- Preceded by: Ivan Guarducci
- Succeeded by: Massimo Nobili

Personal details
- Born: 9 May 1947 (age 79) Premosello, Province of Novara, Italy
- Party: Italian Communist Party; Democratic Party of the Left; Democrats of the Left; Democratic Party
- Profession: Surveyor

Paolo Ravaioli (born 9 May 1947) is an Italian politician who served as president of the Province of Verbano-Cusio-Ossola from 2004 to 2009.

== Career ==
Ravaioli began his political career in local government, serving as a councillor of Villadossola and of the Valle Ossola mountain community. He was also a member of the management committee of USSL 56 Health Agency and served as vice-president of the Province of Verbano-Cusio-Ossola in 1997. He was initially a member of the Italian Communist Party, later joining the Democratic Party of the Left and the Democrats of the Left, before becoming a member of the Democratic Party.

In the 2004 provincial election, Ravaioli was elected president of the province for the centre-left coalition, defeating incumbent Ivan Guarducci in the runoff with 67.15% of the vote. He stood for re-election in 2009, but received 39.5% of the vote and was defeated by the centre-right candidate, Massimo Nobili.

In 2017, he was elected provincial secretary of the Democratic Party.
