= List of mayors of Avellino =

Mayor of Avellino
- Sindaco di Avellino
- Incumbent; Giuliana Perrotta (Special Prefectural Commissioner) since 18 July 2025
- Appointer: Popular election
- Term length: 5 years, renewable once
- Formation: 1861
- Website: Official website

The mayor of Avellino is an elected politician who, along with the Avellino City Council, is accountable for the strategic government of Avellino in Campania, Italy.

Since 18 July 2025, the office has been held by the prefectural commissioner Giuliana Perrotta, following the no-confidence motion that led to the fall of the administration led by mayor Laura Nargi.

== Overview ==
According to the Italian Constitution, the mayor of Avellino is member of the City Council.

The mayor is elected by the population of Avellino, who also elects the members of the City Council, controlling the mayor's policy guidelines and is able to enforce his resignation by a motion of no confidence. The mayor is entitled to appoint and release the members of his government.

Since 1995 the mayor is elected directly by Avellino's electorate: in all mayoral elections in Italy in cities with a population higher than 15,000. The voters express a direct choice for the mayor or an indirect choice voting for the party of the candidate's coalition. If no candidate receives at least 50% of votes, the top two candidates go to a second round after two weeks. The election of the City Council is based on a direct choice for the candidate with a preference vote: the candidate with the majority of the preferences is elected. The number of the seats for each party is determined proportionally.

However, if in the first round no candidate receives a majority, but the lists supporting a candidate different from the eventual runoff winner do; or a mayor is elected in the first round, but the lists supporting them do not receive at least 40% of votes, it will lead to an anatra zoppa (lame duck) situation, in which case the mayor will not have a majority of council on their side. This occurred in the 2018 elections, where Vincenzo Ciampi of the Five Star Movement won the runoff with 59.54% of the vote, but the M5S list supporting him only received 14.2% of the vote in the first round, while the lists supporting centre-left coalition's candidate Nello Pizza received 53.26% of the vote, thus they received a majority on the council. That eventually led to Ciampi losing a council vote of no confidence and resigning after only five months in office, and new elections being called in 2019.

== Italian Republic (since 1946) ==
=== City Council election (1946-1995) ===
From 1946 to 1995, the Mayor of Avellino was elected by the City Council.

	Mayor	Term start	Term end	Party
Special Prefectural Commissioner's tenure (1946–1947)
1	Francesco Amendola	1947	1952	PdA
2	Olindo Preziosi	1952	1952	PNM
3	Domenico Cucciniello	1952	1955	PLI
Special Prefectural Commissioner's tenure (1955–1956)
4	Michelangelo Nicoletti	1956	1963	PLI
5	Emilio Turco	1963	1965	DC
6	Angelo Scalpati	1965	1969	DC
(5)	Emilio Turco	1969	1970	DC
Special Prefectural Commissioner's tenure (1970)
7	Antonio Aurigemma	1970	1975	DC
8	Massimo Preziosi	1975	1980	DC
9	Giovanni Pionati	1980	1981	DC
10	Antonio Matarzzo	1981	1983	DC
(9)	Giovanni Pionati	1983	1984	DC
11	Lorenzo Venezia	1984	1989	DC
12	Angelo Romano	1989	1995	DC

=== Direct election (since 1995) ===
Since 1995, under provisions of new local administration law, the Mayor of Avellino is chosen by direct election, originally every four then every five years.

	Mayor	Term start	Term end	Party	Coalition	Election
13	Antonio Di Nunno	7 May 1995	28 June 1999	PPI; DL	PDS • PRC • PPI • PS	1995
13	Antonio Di Nunno	28 June 1999	31 October 2003 (Note: Reisgned.)	PPI; DL	DS • PRC • PPI • Dem	1999
Special Prefectural Commissioner's tenure (31 October 2003 – 14 June 2004)
14	Giuseppe Galasso	14 June 2004	23 June 2009	DL; PD	DS • UDEUR • DL • SDI	2004
14	Giuseppe Galasso	23 June 2009	31 October 2012 (Note: Resigned.)	DL; PD	PD • IdV	2009
Special Prefectural Commissioner's tenure (31 October 2012 – 11 June 2013)
15	Paolo Foti	11 June 2013	12 July 2018	PD	PD • CD	2013
16	Vincenzo Ciampi	12 July 2018	27 November 2018 (Note: Resigned after suffering a vote of no confidence in the City Council.)	M5S	M5S	2018
Special Prefectural Commissioner's tenure (27 November 2018 – 28 June 2019)
17	Gianluca Festa	28 June 2019	16 April 2024 (Note: Resigned after a corruption scandal.)	Ind	Ind	2019
Special Prefectural Commissioner's tenure (16 April 2024 – 9 July 2024)
18	Laura Nargi	9 July 2024	18 July 2025 (Note: Resigned after suffering a vote of no confidence in the City Council.)	Ind	Ind	2024
Special Prefectural Commissioner's tenure (since 18 July 2025)
19	Nello Pizza	Elected		PD	PD • M5S • AVS • PSI • IV	2026
