= Vincenzo Ciampi =

Italian politician

Member of the Regional Council of Campania
- In office 13 October 2020 – 22 November 2025

Mayor of Avellino
- In office 12 July 2018 – 27 November 2018
- Preceded by: Paolo Foti
- Succeeded by: Gianluca Festa

Personal details
- Born: 12 December 1967 (age 58) Avellino, Italy
- Party: Five Star Movement
- Education: University of Naples Federico II
- Profession: lawyer

Vincenzo Ciampi (born 12 December 1967) is an Italian politician.

He is a member of the Five Star Movement and ran for Mayor of Avellino in the 2018 local elections. In the first round, he came second with 20.23% of the votes, after centre-left candidate Nello Pizza. In the runoff, he defeated Pizza with 59.54% of the vote. However, in the first round, the M5S list supporting him only received 14.2% of votes, while the lists supporting Pizza received 53.26% of votes, thus he did not have a majority on the city council, leading to an anatra zoppa situation. He served from July to November 2018. He resigned after a motion of no confidence and the office was held by a Special Commissioner appointed on 27 November 2018 until 2019 new elections.

On 13 October 2020, Ciampi was elected member of the Regional Council of Campania.

== See also ==
- 2018 Italian local elections
- List of mayors of Avellino

Political offices
Preceded by Paolo Foti	Mayor of Avellino; July 2018 – November 2018	Succeeded by Gianluca Festa
