= Marco Zacchera =

Italian politician

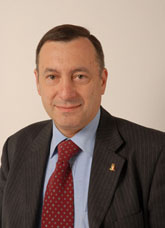

Mayor of Verbania
- In office 8 June 2009 – 30 April 2013
- Preceded by: Claudio Zanotti
- Succeeded by: Silvia Marchionini

Member of the Chamber of Deputies
- In office 15 April 1994 – 12 January 2012

Personal details
- Born: 10 October 1951 (age 74) Verbania, Piedmont, Italy
- Party: National Alliance (1994-2009); The People of Freedom (2009-2013)
- Education: Bocconi University; University of Eastern Piedmont
- Profession: tax advisor

Marco Zacchera (born 10 October 1951 in Verbania) is an Italian politician.

He was elected at the Chamber of Deputies for five legislatures (XII, XIII, XIV, XV, XVI) with the right-wing parties National Alliance (1994, 1996, 2001, 2006) and The People of Freedom (2008).

Zacchera served as Mayor of Verbania from June 2009 to April 2013.

== See also ==
- List of mayors of Verbania

Political offices
Preceded by Claudio Zanotti	Mayor of Verbania; 2009–2013	Succeeded by Silvia Marchionini
