= Antonio Chieffo =

Italian politician

Regional assessor for Local authorities of Molise
- In office 21 November 2011 – 16 March 2013
- President: Angelo Michele Iorio

Regional assessor of Transports and Public works of Molise
- In office July 2003 – February 2006
- President: Angelo Michele Iorio

Member of the Regional Council of Molise
- In office 27 December 2001 – 16 March 2013

President of the Province of Campobasso
- In office 20 July 1987 – 23 November 2001
- Preceded by: Antonio Macchiarola
- Succeeded by: Augusto Massa

Personal details
- Born: 3 July 1952 (age 73) Colletorto, Province of Campobasso, Italy
- Party: Christian Democracy, Forza Italia
- Occupation: Public administrator

Antonio Chieffo (born 3 July 1952) is an Italian politician who served as a member of the Regional Council of Molise and president of the Province of Campobasso.

== Life and career ==
Chieffo was born in Colletorto in 1952. He was active in local politics with the Christian Democracy party, serving as a municipal councillor and later as mayor of Colletorto from 1980 to 1985. He subsequently served as provincial councillor and as provincial assessor for environment, hunting and fishing from 1985 to 1987.

He was first elected president of the Province of Campobasso in 1987, holding the office for three consecutive terms until 2001.

After leaving the provincial presidency, Chieffo joined Forza Italia and was later elected to the Regional Council of Molise, where he served as regional assessor for infrastructure, transport and public works. He was re-elected in 2006 and again in 2011 with the Great South list.
