= Seppiana =

- Frazione
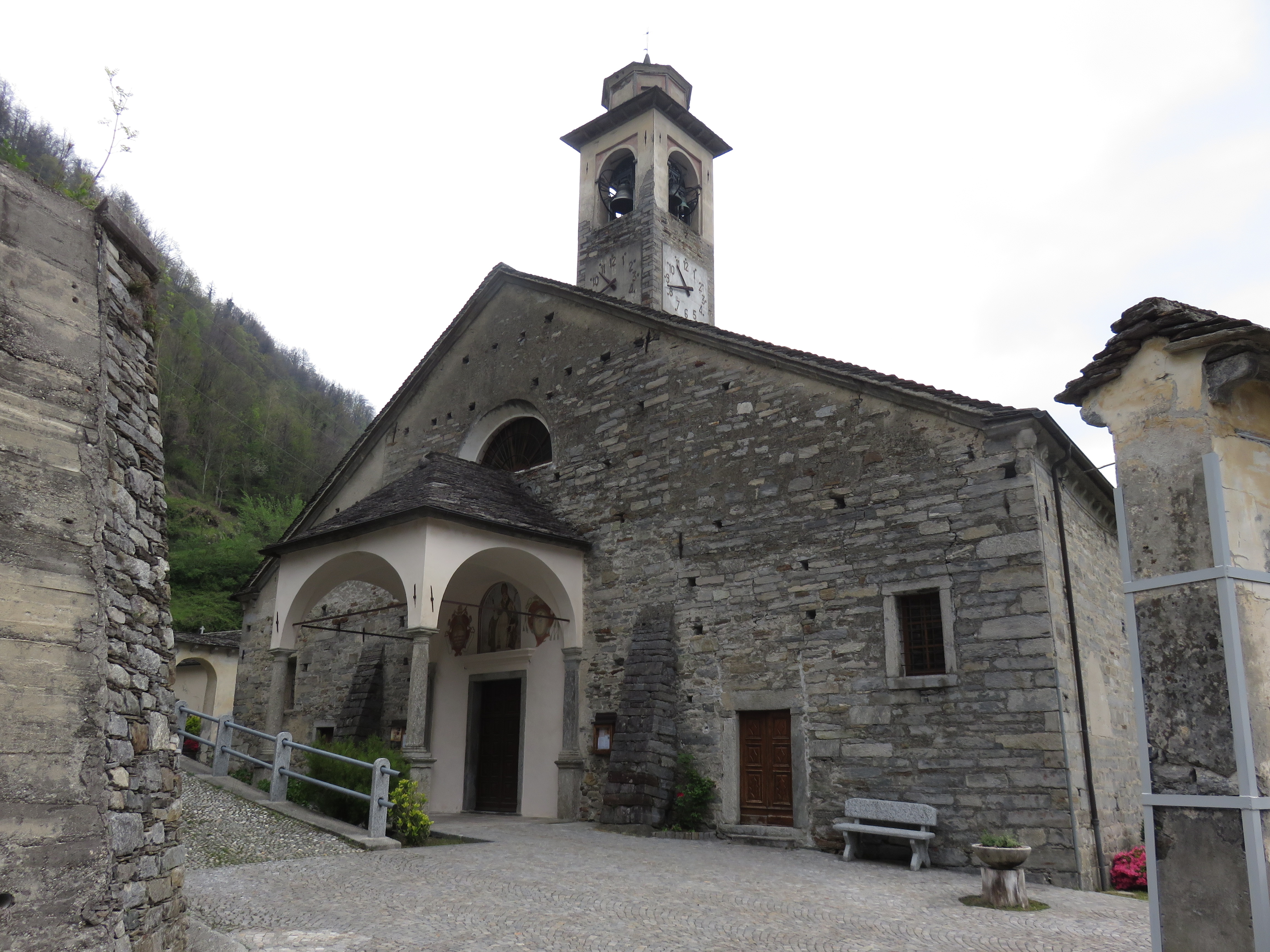
- Church of St Ambrose.

- Location of Seppiana in Italy
- Coordinates: 46°03′27.8″N 8°12′56.1″E
- Country: Italy
- Region: Piedmont
- Province: Verbano-Cusio-Ossola
- Comune: Borgomezzavalle

Area
  - Total: 5.42 km^{2} (2.09 sq mi)
- Elevation: 557 m (1,827 ft)

Population (31/12/2010)
  - Total: 159
  - Density: 29.3/km^{2} (76.0/sq mi)
- Demonym: seppianesi
- Time zone: UTC+1 (CET)
  - Summer (DST): UTC+2 (CEST)
- Postal code: 28846 (già 28843)
- Dialing code: 0324
- Patron saint: Saint Ambrose
- Saint day: 7 December
- Website: https://www.comune.borgomezzavalle.vb.it/en-us/home

Seppiana is a frazione of the comune of Borgomezzavalle, Province of Verbano-Cusio-Ossola in the Italian region Piedmont, situated in the Valle Antrona. It is located about 120 kilometres (75 mi) northeast of Turin and about 30 kilometres (19 mi) northwest of Verbania.

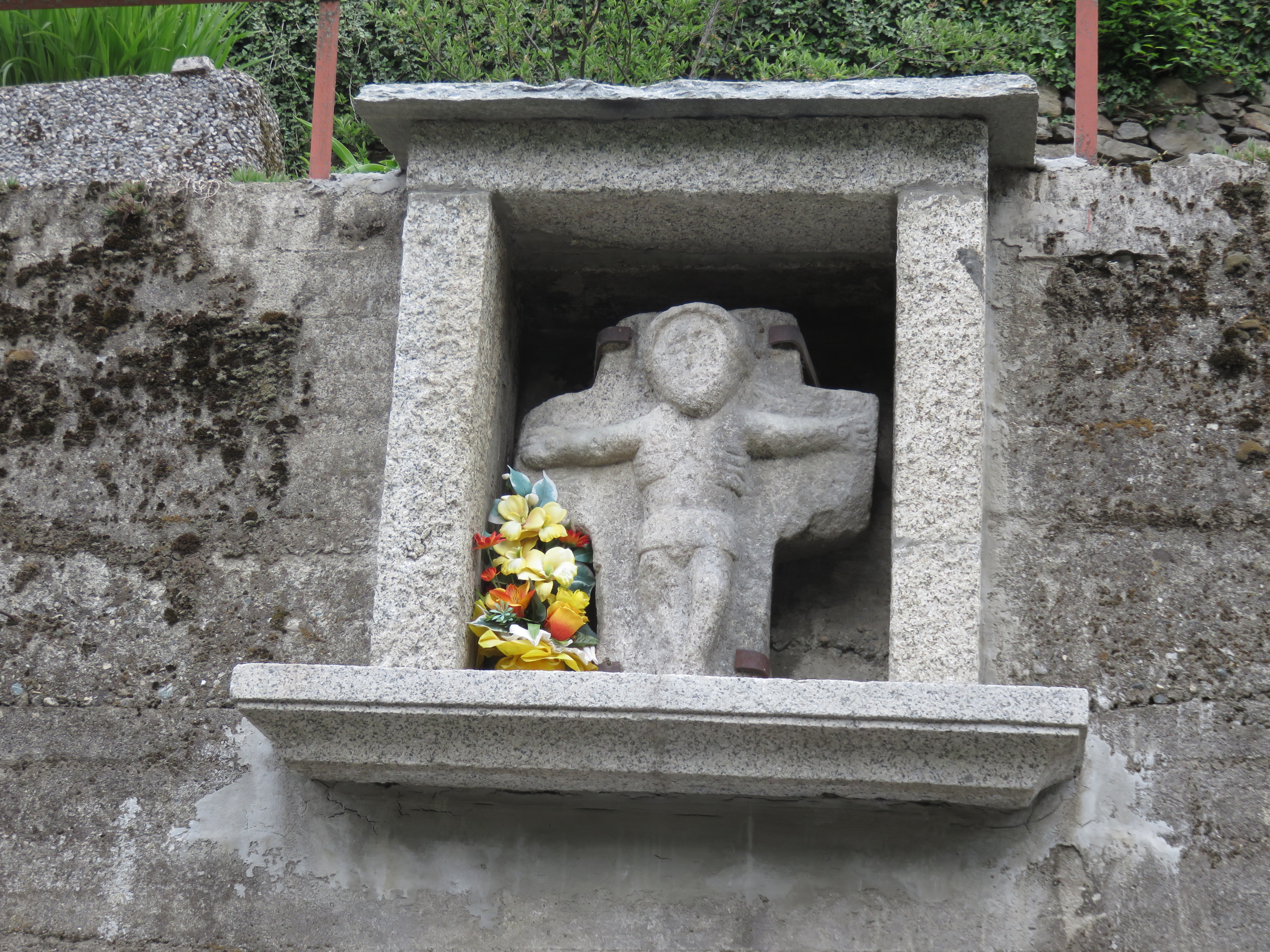
A Christian altar in Seppiana.

On 1 January 2016, it was merged with Viganella merged into the municipality of Borgomezzavalle.
