= Oscar De Bona =

Italian politician

Oscar De Bona (born 27 December 1948 in Trichiana) is an Italian politician.

A long-time member of the Italian Socialist Party, he was elected President of the Province of Belluno in 1990. After the disbandment of that party, he joined Lega Autonomia Veneta and was re-elected President of the Province in 1995 and 1999. For his third re-election, he launched a local list named Dolomitic Agreement, which was later merged in the Venetian section of the New Italian Socialist Party. From 2005 to 2010, De Bona was regional minister of Immigration in Galan III Government. In 2010, he ran for a seat in the Regional Council of Veneto in the Province of Belluno, unsuccessfully.
