= Cecilia Contu =

Italian politician (1937–2022)

President of the Province of Cagliari
- In office 7 January 1994 – 8 May 1995
- Preceded by: Eliseo Secci
- Succeeded by: Nicola Scano

Secretary of the Sardinian Action Party
- In office 1994–1995
- Preceded by: Giancarlo Acciaro
- Succeeded by: Lorenzo Palermo

Personal details
- Born: 17 January 1937 Codrongianos, Province of Sassari, Kingdom of Italy
- Died: 22 December 2022 (aged 85) Cagliari, Sardinia, Italy
- Party: Sardinian Action Party
- Profession: Teacher

Cecilia Contu (17 January 1937 – 22 December 2022) was an Italian politician and teacher. A member of the Sardinian Action Party, she served as president of the Province of Cagliari from January 1994 to May 1995, becoming the first woman to hold the office.

Contu was the daughter of Anselmo Contu, a sardist politician and the first president of the Regional Council of Sardinia. She served as provincial assessor for the environment from 1985 to 1990 and as national secretary of the Sardinian Action Party from 1994 to 1995.

Contu died in Cagliari on 22 December 2022, at the age of 85.
