= Angelo Romano =

Italian politician (1934–2026)

Mayor of Avellino
- In office 25 April 1989 – 8 May 1995
- Preceded by: Lorenzo Venezia
- Succeeded by: Antonio Di Nunno

Personal details
- Born: 4 June 1934 Capriglia Irpina, Avellino, Kingdom of Italy
- Died: 21 March 2026 (aged 91) Avellino, Campania, Italy
- Party: Christian Democracy; Forza Italia

Angelo Romano (4 June 1934 – 21 March 2026) was an Italian politician.

== Life and career ==
Romano was born in Avellino on 4 June 1934. He was a member of the Christian Democrats. He was elected city councillor in his hometown. He was mayor of Avellino from April 1989 to May 1995, distinguishing himself as the "mayor of demolitions". After the dissolution of the Christian Democrats he moved to Forza Italia, sitting again on the benches of the city council from 1999 to 2003.

Romano died 21 March 2026, at the age of 91.
