= Calasca-Castiglione =

- Comune
- Comune di Calasca-Castiglione

- Coat of arms

- Location within Italy Location within Piedmont
- Coordinates: 46°4′N 8°7′E
- Country: Italy
- Region: Piedmont
- Province: Verbano-Cusio-Ossola (VB)
- Frazioni: Barzona, Calasca dentro, Pianezzo, Antrogna, Duiamen, Molini, Gurva, Boretta, Vigino, Porcareccia, Pecciola, Selvavecchia, Castiglione d'Ossola, Colombetti, Meggianella

Government
  - Mayor: Silvia Tipaldi

Area
  - Total: 57.07 km^{2} (22.03 sq mi)
- Elevation: 665 m (2,182 ft)

Population (30 April 2017)
  - Total: 637
  - Density: 11.2/km^{2} (28.9/sq mi)
- Demonym: Calaschesi
- Time zone: UTC+1 (CET)
  - Summer (DST): UTC+2 (CEST)
- Postal code: 28873
- Dialing code: 0324
- Patron saint: St. Anthony the Abbot
- Saint day: 17 January
- Website: Official website

Calasca-Castiglione is a comune (municipality) in the Province of Verbano-Cusio-Ossola in the Italian region Piedmont, located about 120 kilometres (75 mi) northeast of Turin and about 35 kilometres (22 mi) northwest of Verbania.

Calasca-Castiglione borders the following municipalities: Antrona Schieranco, Bannio Anzino, Borgomezzavalle, Pallanzeno, Piedimulera, Pieve Vergonte, Rimella, Valstrona, Vanzone con San Carlo.
