= Antonio Di Nunno =

Italian politician (1945–2015)

Mayor of Avellino
- In office 7 May 1995 – 31 October 2003
- Preceded by: Angelo Romano
- Succeeded by: Giuseppe Galasso

Personal details
- Born: 5 August 1945 Avellino, Campania, Italy
- Died: 3 January 2015 (aged 69) Avellino, Campania, Italy
- Party: Italian People's Party
- Occupation: Journalist

Antonio Di Nunno (5 August 1945 – 3 January 2015) was an Italian politician and journalist. He served as mayor of Avellino as a member of the Italian People's Party from May 1995 to October 2003. Antonio considered the usefulness of political commitment in his city.

== Biography ==
Antonio Di Nunno was born in Avellino, Campania on 5 August 1945 and died in Avellino, Campania at the age of 69. He died as a result of an illness that had affected him irreparably fifteen years before his death in January 2015. He was a professional journalist of RAI Tgr Campania.

== See also ==
- List of mayors of Avellino

Political offices
Preceded by Angelo Romano	Mayor of Avellino; 7 May 1995 – 31 October 2003	Succeeded by Giuseppe Galasso
