= Aldo Reschigna =

Italian politician

Mayor of Verbania
- In office 13 September 1993 – 14 June 2004
- Preceded by: Bartolomeo Zani
- Succeeded by: Claudio Zanotti

Member of the Regional Council of Piedmont
- In office 16 May 2005 – 26 May 2019

Vice President of Piedmont
- In office 16 June 2014 – 26 May 2019
- President: Sergio Chiamparino
- Preceded by: Gilberto Pichetto Fratin
- Succeeded by: Fabio Carosso

Personal details
- Born: 6 April 1956 (age 70) Verbania, Piedmont, Italy
- Party: Italian Communist Party; Democratic Party of the Left; Democrats of the Left; Democratic Party

Aldo Reschigna (born 6 April 1956) is an Italian politician who served as Mayor of Verbania (1993–2004), member of the Regional Council of Piedmont (2005–2019) and Vice President of Piedmont (2014–2019).
