= Timeline of Piacenza =

The following is a timeline of the history of the city of Piacenza in the Emilia-Romagna region of Italy.

== Prior to 18th century ==
- 218 BCE – Placentia becomes a Roman colony.
- 205 BCE – Placentia besieged by Carthaginian forces of Hasdrubal.
- 200 BCE – Town sacked by Gaulish forces.
- 187 BCE – Via Aemilia (Ariminum-Placentia road) built.
- 271 CE – The Marcomanni defeat the Aurehan outside the city walls.
- 375 CE – Basilica of Sant'Antonino built.
- 450 CE – Roman Catholic Diocese of Piacenza established (approximate date).
- 546 – "Totila reduced Piacenza by famine."
- 903 – San Savino church construction begins.
- 988 – Piacenza becomes an archbishopric.
- 997 – Piacenza demoted to a bishopric; Emperor Otto III removes the city from the county of Piacenza and gives it to the bishop.
- 1005 – Bishop Siegfried moves San Savino outside the walls and rebuilds it.
- 1095 – Council of Piacenza a mixed synod of ecclesiastics and laymen.
- 1107 – San Savino rebuilt in a Romanesque style.
- 1122 – Piacenza Cathedral construction begins.
- 1167 – Piacenza joins the Lombard League.
- 1183 – Meeting of Lombard League held in Piacenza regarding the Peace of Constance.
- 1226 – Piacenza joins renewed Lombard League.
- 1229 – Piacenza participates in War of the Keys on the side of the pope and the Battle of San Cesario on the side of Bologna.
- 1233 – Piacenza Cathedral construction completed.
- 1235 – Guelph Annals of Piacenza finished.
- 1254 – Scotti (family) in power.
- 1278 – San Francesco church construction begins.
- 1281 – Palazzo Comunale built.
- 1334 – Sant'Anna church built.
- 1400 – Public clock installed (approximate date).
- 1447 – Piacenza taken by forces of Francesco I Sforza.
- 1471 – Hospital built.
- 1475 – Printing press in operation.
- 1499 – San Sisto church construction begins.
- 1512 – Piacenza "occupied by the papal forces."
- 1545 – Duchy of Parma and Piacenza created under Pier Luigi Farnese, Duke of Parma.
- 1558 – Palazzo Farnese construction begins.
- 1620 – Statue of Ranuccio I Farnese erected in the Piazza dei Cavalli.
- 1625 – Statue of Alexander Farnese erected in the Piazza dei Cavalli.

== 18th–19th centuries ==
- 1738 – Austrians in power per Treaty of Vienna (1738).
- 1746 – 16 June: Austrian-Sardinian and Franco-Spanish conflict fought near city.
- 1748 – Spaniards in power.
- 1796 – Piacenza occupied by French forces.
- 1801 – Piacenza becomes part of the Kingdom of Piedmont-Sardinia per Treaty of Lunéville.
- 1804 – Teatro Municipale (Piacenza) (theatre) opens.
- 1811 – Biblioteca Comunale Passerini-Landi (library) established.
- 1821
  - Political unrest.
  - Cimitero di Piacenza (cemetery) established.
- 1831 – Political unrest.
- 1848 – 10 May: "Piacenza was the first Italian city to vote for union with Piedmont" during the Revolution of 1848.
- 1859
  - Piacenza–Bologna railway begins operating; Piacenza railway station opens.
  - Piacenza becomes part of the Kingdom of Piedmont-Sardinia.
  - Circondario di Piacenza (provincial district) established.
- 1860 – Alessandria–Piacenza railway begins operating.
- 1861 – Population: 40,582.^{(it)}
- 1867 – Progresso newspaper begins publication.
- 1883 – Libertà newspaper begins publication.

== 20th century ==
- 1902 – Piacenza tram begins operating.
- 1903 – Museo Civico (museum) founded.
- 1911 – Population: 38,542.
- 1919 – Piacenza Football Club formed.
- 1920 – Stadio comunale di Piacenza (stadium) opens.
- 1932 – Ferrovia Piacenza-Bettola (railway) begins operating.
- 1933 – Piacenza–Cremona railway begins operating.
- 1936 – Population: 64,210.^{(it)}
- 1961 – Population: 88,541.^{(it)}
- 1969 – Stadio Leonardo Garilli (stadium) opens.
- 1981 – Population: 109,039.^{(it)}
- 1994 – Local election held; Giacomo Vaciago (center-left) becomes Mayor. He is the first Mayor elected by direct vote in the history of Piacenza.
- 1995 – Local election held; Dario Squeri (center-left) is elected President of the Province of Piacenza. He is the first President elected by direct vote in the history of Piacenza.
- 1998 – Local election held; the lawyer Gianguido Guidotti (center-right) becomes Mayor. He is the first Mayor of the center-right coalition elected by direct vote in the history of Piacenza. The incumbent Mayor Giacomo Vaciago is the first Mayor to not run for a second final term.
- 1999 – Local election held; Dario Squeri (center-left) is elected re-President of the Province of Piacenza.

== 21st century ==
- 2000 – La Cronaca newspaper begins publication.
- 2002 – Local election held; Roberto Reggi (center-left) becomes Mayor. The incumbent Mayor Gianguido Guidotti is the first Mayor to lost a run-off in the direct vote.
- 2004 – Local election held; Gian Luigi Boiardi (center-left) is elected President of the Province of Piacenza.
- 2007 – Local election held; Roberto Reggi (center-left) is re-elected Mayor. He is the first incumbent Mayor re-elected by direct vote.
- 2008 – Museo civico di storia naturale di Piacenza (museum) opens in the Fabbrica del Ghiaccio.
- 2009 – Local election held; Massimo Trespidi is elected President of the Province of Piacenza. He is the first President of the center-right elected by direct vote in the history of Piacenza. The incumbent Mayor Gianluigi Boiardi is the first President to lost at the first round in the direct vote.
- 2012 – Local election held; Paolo Dosi (center-left) becomes Mayor.
- 2013
  - Piacenza–Cremona railway closed.
  - Population: 100,843.
- 2017 – Local election held; the lawyer Patrizia Barbieri (center-right) becomes Mayor. She is the first female Mayor elected by direct vote in the history of Piacenza. The incumbent Mayor Paolo Dosi is the second Mayor to not run for a second final term.

== See also ==
- Piacenza history
- History of Piacenza
- List of mayors of Piacenza
- List of counts of Piacenza, 8th–11th centuries
- List of bishops of Piacenza
- State Archives of Piacenza (state archives)

Timelines of other cities in the macroregion of Northeast Italy:^{(it)}

- Emilia-Romagna region: Timeline of Bologna; Ferrara; Forlì; Modena; Parma; Ravenna; Reggio Emilia; Rimini
- Friuli-Venezia Giulia region: Timeline of Trieste
- Trentino-South Tyrol region: Timeline of Trento
- Veneto region: Timeline of Padua; Treviso; Venice; Verona; Vicenza

== Bibliography ==
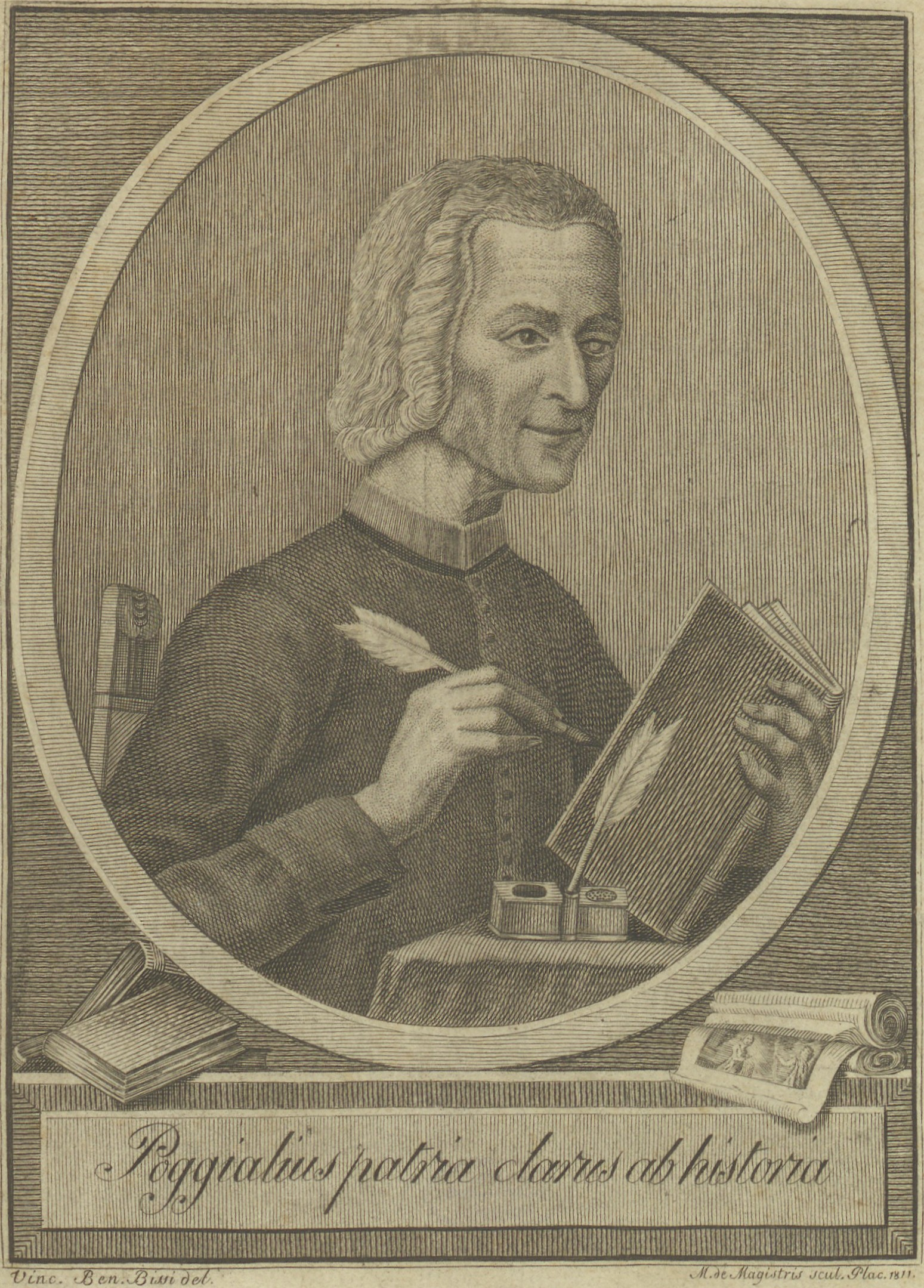
Portrait of Cristoforo Poggiali, 18th century historian of Piacenza

=== in English ===
- William Smith, ed. (1872) [1854]. "Placentia". Dictionary of Greek and Roman Geography. London: John Murray. hdl:2027/hvd.ah5cur.
- "Piacenza", Hand-book for Travellers in Northern Italy (16th ed.), London: John Murray, 1897, OCLC 2231483
- "Piacenza". Chambers's Encyclopaedia. London. 1901. hdl:2027/njp.32101065312934.
- "Piacenza" . Encyclopædia Britannica. Vol. 21 (11th ed.). 1910. pp. 558–559.
- Benjamin Vincent (1910), "Placentia", Haydn's Dictionary of Dates (25th ed.), London: Ward, Lock & Co., hdl:2027/uc2.ark:/13960/t41r6xh8t
- "Piacenza", Northern Italy (14th ed.), Leipzig: Karl Baedeker, 1913
- Roy Domenico (2002). "Emilia Romagna: Piacenza". Regions of Italy: a Reference Guide to History and Culture. Greenwood. pp. 95+. ISBN 0313307334.
- Christopher Kleinhenz, ed. (2004). "Piacenza". Medieval Italy: an Encyclopedia. Routledge. ISBN 0415939291.
- Charles M. Rosenberg, ed. (2010). Court Cities of Northern Italy: Milan, Parma, Piacenza, Mantua, Ferrara, Bologna, Urbino, Pesaro, and Rimini. Cambridge University Press. ISBN 978-0-521-79248-6.
- Porter, A. Kingsley (1912). "San Savino at Piacenza, I: History and Structure". American Journal of Archaeology. 16 (3): 350–367. doi:10.2307/497193. JSTOR 497193. S2CID 191373774.

=== in Italian ===
- Cristoforo Poggiali [in Italian]. Memorie storiche della città di Piacenza. Gicopazzi. 1757-1766 (12 volumes)
  - v.11
- Luciano Scarabelli [in Italian] (1841). Guida ai monumenti storici ed artistici della città di Piacenza. Lodi: Wilmant e Figli.
- Nuovissima guida della citta di Piacenza. Piacenza: Domenico Tagliaferri. 1842.
- "Piacenza". Nuova Enciclopedia Italiana (in Italian). Vol. 17 (6th ed.). Turin: Unione Tipografico-Editrice Torinese. 1884. hdl:2027/nnc1.cu08476845.
- Carlo Lozzi (1887). "Storie de'Municipii: Piacenza". Biblioteca istorica della antica e nuova Italia (in Italian). Vol. 2. Imola. OCLC 12117233. (bibliography)
- Henry Berger, ed. (1899), "Giornali Italiani (per ordine di localita): Piacenza", Annuario della stampa italiana (in Italian), Milan
- "Piacenza", Enciclopedia Italiana (Treccani) (in Italian), 1935
- Piero Castignoli. Storia di Piacenza (in Italian). OCLC 25082754. circa 1980-2002 (6 volumes)
- Maria Luigia Pagliani (1991). Piacenza: forma e urbanistica. Città antiche in Italia. L'Erma di Bretschneider. ISBN 978-88-7062-719-0.
