= Timeline of Reggio Emilia =

The following is a timeline of the history of the city of Reggio Emilia in the Emilia-Romagna region of Italy.

== Prior to 18th century ==
- 187 BCE – Via Aemilia (road) built through town.
- 77 BCE – Roman tribune Marcus Junius Brutus the Elder assassinated.
- 328 – Protasio, First known Bishop of Regium (Reggio Emilia).
- 409 – Reggio sacked by Gothic.
- 899 – Reggio sacked by Magyar forces.
- 924 – Reggio sacked by Magyar forces.
- 1168 – Reggio joins the Lombard League.
- May 29, 1176 – Victorious Battle of Legnano (Italian Cities allies, Lombard league, against the Emperor).

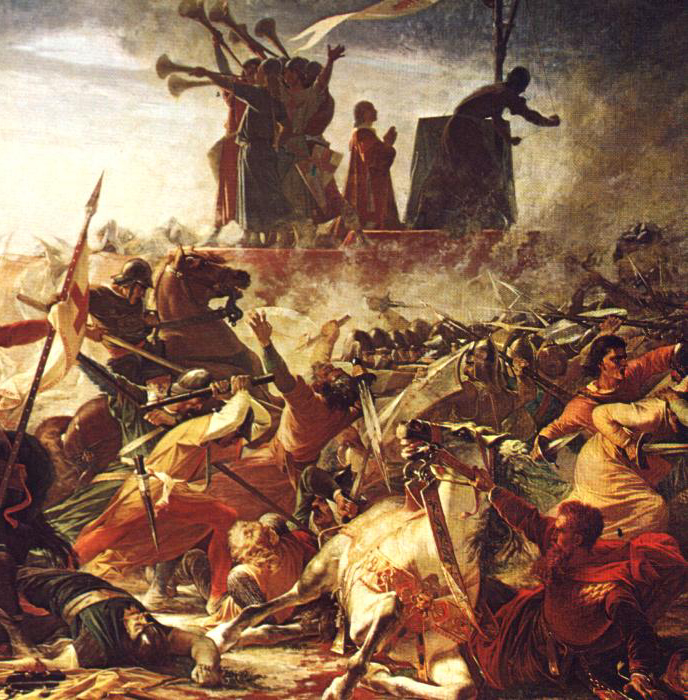
The defence of the Carroccio during the battle of Legnano (1176) by Amos Cassioli (1832–1891)

- June 25, 1183 Peace of Constance .
- 1245 – Consuetudini (law) issued.
- 1289 – Obizzo II d'Este in power.
- 1409 – Este in power (until 1796).
- 1452 – Duchy of Reggio established.
- 1474 – Birth of Ludovico Ariosto, poet.
- 1480 – Printing press in operation.
- 1512 – Forces of Pope Julius II occupy Reggio.
- 1523 – Este rule restored.
- 1597 – Basilica della Ghiara construction begins.

== 18th–19th centuries ==
- 1741 – Teatro della cittadella (theatre) opens.
- 1746 – Accademia degli Ipocondriaci active.
- 1798 – Biblioteca Nazionale (library) opens.
- 1808 – Reggio becomes seat of the Crostolo department in the French Cisalpine Republic.
- 1819 – Reale Accademia Reggiana di Scienze, Lettere ed Arti established.
- 1830 – Musei Civici di Reggio Emilia (museum) active.
- 1856 – Reggio Emilia Synagogue built.
- 1857 – Teatro Municipale (theatre) opens.
- 1859
  - Reggio Emilia railway station opens.
  - Reggio becomes part of the Kingdom of Piedmont-Sardinia.
- 1860 – Gazzetta di Reggio newspaper begins publication.
- 1861 – Reggio becomes part of the Kingdom of Italy.
- 1862 – Chamber of Commerce established.
- 1873 – Dismantling of the Walls of Reggio Emilia begins.
- 1887 – Ferrovia Reggio Emilia-Guastalla (railway) in operation.
- 1892 – Ferrovia Reggio Emilia-Sassuolo (railway) in operation.
- 1897 – Population: 59,117.
- 1900 – Basilica della Ghiara restored.

== 20th century ==
- 1901
  - Officine Meccaniche Reggiane manufactory in business.
  - Camera del Lavoro established.
- 1906 – Population: 64,548.
- 1910 – Stadio Mirabello (stadium) built.
- 1911
  - Ferrovia Reggio Emilia-Ciano d'Enza (railway) in operation.
  - Population: 70,419.
- 1919 – A.C. Reggiana 1919 (football club) formed.
- 1927 – Ferrovia Reggio Emilia-Boretto (railway) begins operating.
- 1931 – Population: 91,040.
- 1944 – 8 January: Bombing of Reggio by Allied forces during World War II.
- 1945 – Cesare Campioli becomes mayor (until 1962).
- 1965 – Istituto per la Storia della Resistenza e della Società contemporanea (history institute) active.
- 1995 – Mapei Stadium – Città del Tricolore opens.

== 21st century ==
- 2013 – Population: 163,928.
- 2014 – Local election held; Luca Vecchi becomes mayor.

== See also ==
- History of Reggio Emilia
- List of mayors of Reggio Emilia
- List of bishops of Reggio Emilia
- List of dukes of Reggio

Timelines of other cities in the macroregion of Northeast Italy:^{(it)}

- Emilia-Romagna region: Timeline of Bologna; Ferrara; Forlì; Modena; Parma; Piacenza; Ravenna; Rimini
- Friuli-Venezia Giulia region: Timeline of Trieste
- Trentino-South Tyrol region: Timeline of Trento
- Veneto region: Timeline of Padua; Treviso; Venice; Verona; Vicenza

== Bibliography ==
=== in English ===
- William Smith, ed. (1872) [1854]. "Regium Lepidi". Dictionary of Greek and Roman Geography. London: John Murray. hdl:2027/hvd.ah5cur.
- "Reggio". Chambers's Encyclopaedia. London. 1901. hdl:2027/njp.32101065312934.
- Umberto Cassuto (1905), "Reggio", Jewish Encyclopedia, vol. 10, New York, hdl:2027/msu.31293024395141
- "Reggio nell' Emilia" . Encyclopædia Britannica. Vol. 23 (11th ed.). 1910. p. 38.
- Edward Hutton (1912), "Reggio", Cities of Lombardy, New York: Macmillan Co.
- "Reggio", Northern Italy (14th ed.), Leipzig: Karl Baedeker, 1913
- Roy Domenico (2002). "Emilia Romagna: Reggio nell' Emilia". Regions of Italy: a Reference Guide to History and Culture. Greenwood. pp. 99+. ISBN 0313307334.

=== in Italian ===
- Taccoli. Memorie di Reggio Emilia, Parma 1748
- Girolamo Tiraboschi, ed. (1825). "Regium Lepidi". Dizionario topografico storico degli stati Estensi (in Italian).
- "Reggio d'Emilia", Nuova Enciclopedia Italiana (in Italian), vol. 19 (6th ed.), Unione tipografico-editrice torinese, 1885, pp. 51+, hdl:2027/nnc1.cu08476861
- Carlo Lozzi (1887). "Storie de'Municipii: Reggio d' Emilia". Biblioteca istorica della antica e nuova Italia (in Italian). Vol. 2. Imola. OCLC 12117233. (bibliography)
- U. Bassi. Reggio Emilia alla fine del sec. XVIII, 1895
- Giovanni Crocioni (1907). I teatri di Reggio nell' Emilia. Cooperativa lavorante tipografi.
- A. Balletti. Storia di Reggio nell'Emilia, 1925
- "Reggio nell' Emilia", Enciclopedia Italiana (Treccani) (in Italian), 1935
