= Ciampoli =

Ciampoli is an Italian surname. Notable people with the surname include:

- Domenico Ciampoli (1852–1929), Italian writer
- Giovanni Ciampoli (1589–1643), Italian priest, poet, and humanist
- Tulia Ciámpoli (1915–1981), Argentine actress, dancer, and violinist

== See also ==
- Campoli
- Campioli
