= Katia Tarasconi =

Italian politician

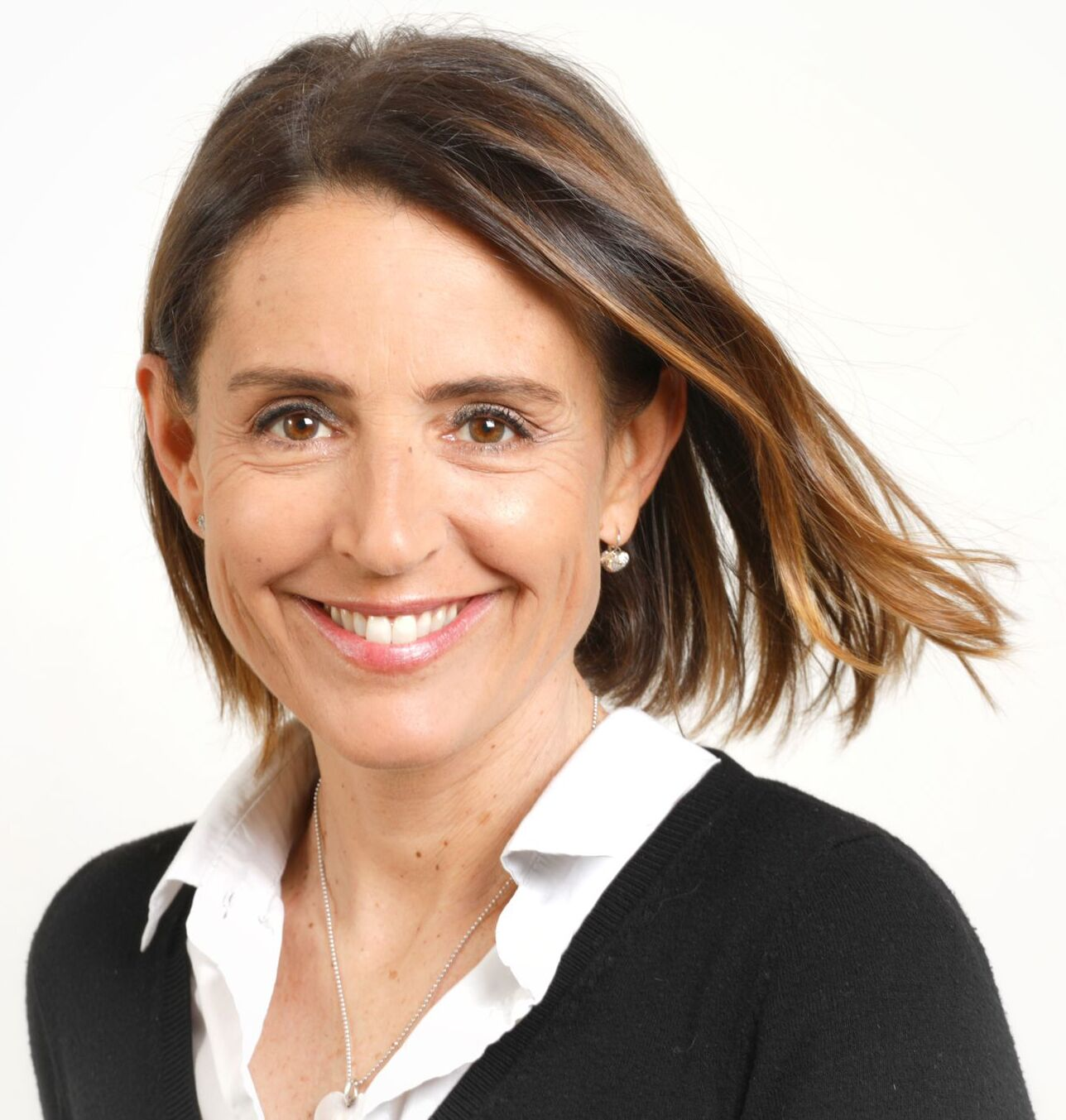

Mayor of Piacenza
- Incumbent
- Assumed office 29 June 2022
- Preceded by: Patrizia Barbieri

Member of the Legislative Assembly of Emilia-Romagna
- In office 27 July 2015 – 28 June 2022
- President: Simonetta Salieri (2015–20); Emma Petitti (2020–22)
- Preceded by: Paola Gazzolo
- Succeeded by: Gian Luigi Molinari

Personal details
- Born: 5 October 1973 (age 52) Piacenza, Italy
- Party: Democratic Party
- Children: 2
- Education: University of Miami
- Occupation: Graphic designer, manager

Katia Tarasconi (born 5 October 1973) is an Italian politician, Mayor of Piacenza since 2022.

== Biography ==
Tarasconi graduated in 1998 with a degree in graphic arts from University of Miami where she worked for two years for the editorial art department of the Miami Herald. Back to Italy, she worked as commercial manager of the communication company Irix from Piacenza, of which she was managing director from 2001 to 2008.

=== Assessor and Councilor ===
She joined the Democratic Party and has been assessor for trade in Piacenza from 2007 to 2015 with the Mayor Roberto Reggi (PD) until 2012 and with the Mayor Paolo Dosi (PD) since 2012. In the 2014 Emilia-Romagna regional election, she became the first of the non-elected in the Piacenza district, but after Paola Gazzolo's appointment as Regional assessor (according to the Italian law, a role in the Regional executive is not compatible with the legislative seat) Tarasconi was proclaimed on 27 July 2015 in the former seat of her predecessor Gazzolo in the Legislative Assembly of Emilia-Romagna, being later re-elected at the 2020 regional election.

=== Mayor of Piacenza ===
Before the 2022 local elections, she announced her candidacy for the office of Mayor of Piacenza as the official candidate of the centre-left coalition (Democratic Party, Azione and four civic lists). After obtaining 39.93% in the first round, she entered the second round against the centre-right candidate and incumbent mayor Patrizia Barbieri and was elected new mayor with 53,46% of the votes. In accordance with Italian law, she vacated her seat in the Regional council on 28. June, as the office of Mayor is not compatible with membership of the National Parliament or Regional Council and she officially took office on 29. June.

=== Personal life ===
Divorced, already married to an American citizen, she had two children: in September 2021, she lost her 18-year-old son Kristopher Dixon, involved in a car accident in Rome.

Political offices
Preceded by Patrizia Barbieri	Mayor of Piacenza since 2022	Incumbent
