= Dario Squeri =

Italian politician (born 1952)

President of the Province of Piacenza
- In office 10 May 1995 – 28 June 2004
- Preceded by: Renato Zurla
- Succeeded by: Gian Luigi Boiardi

Personal details
- Born: 13 May 1952 (age 74) Piacenza, Italy
- Party: The Daisy (2002–2004) Centro Popolare Europeo (2004-present)

Dario Squeri (born 13 May 1952) is an Italian politician who served as president of the Province of Piacenza from 1995 to 2004. He was first elected with the centre-left The Olive Tree coalition and re-elected in 1999 after forming an alliance with the Lega Nord.

In 2002, he was the founder of The Daisy in the province of Piacenza. In 2004, he moved towards the centre-right and founded the Centro Popolare Europeo.

Squeri was the centre-right candidate for mayor of Piacenza in 2007, reaching the runoff but losing to incumbent mayor Roberto Reggi, who won with 55.7% of the vote.
