= List of presidents of the Province of Piacenza =

President of the Province of Piacenza
- Presidente della Provincia di Piacenza
- Incumbent; Monica Patelli since 25 September 2022
- Term length: 4 years
- Inaugural holder: Carolippo Guerra
- Formation: 1889

The president of the Province of Piacenza is the head of the provincial government in Piacenza, Emilia-Romagna, Italy. The president oversees the administration of the province, coordinates the activities of the municipalities, and represents the province in regional and national matters.

Since September 2022, the office has been held by Monica Patelli, a centre-left independent.

== List ==
=== Presidents of the Provincial Deputation (1889–1926) ===
No.	Portrait	Name	Term start	Term end	Party
1		Carolippo Guerra	December 1889	July 1895	
2		Francesco Achille	August 1895	June 1897	
3		Giovanni Pavesi Negri	August 1897	April 1911	
4		Enrico Ranza	April 1911	July 1914	
5		Marco Boscarelli	August 1914	November 1920	
6		Giuseppe Cavallini	November 1920	May 1922	
7		Aurelio De Francesco	February 1923	December 1923	
8		Fausto Marchesi	January 1924	February 1924	National Fascist Party
9		Francesco Pallastrelli	February 1924	December 1925	
(8)		Fausto Marchesi	January 1926	February 1928	National Fascist Party

=== Presidents of the Provincial Rectorate (1926–1945) ===
No.	Portrait	Name	Term start	Term end	Party
1		Fausto Marchesi	May 1929	April 1932	National Fascist Party
2		Carlo Archieri	September 1932	March 1934	National Fascist Party
3		Guido Gottardi	June 1934	June 1938	National Fascist Party
4		Giovanni Battista Cella Malugani	June 1938	July 1943	National Fascist Party
5		Pietro Tassi	February 1944	April 1945	National Fascist Party

=== Presidents of the Provincial Deputation (1945–1951) ===
No.	Portrait	Name	Term start	Term end	Party
1		Francesco Pallastrelli	May 1945	January 1948	Christian Democracy
2		Ettore Martini	September 1948	May 1951	Christian Democracy

=== Presidents of the Province (1951–present) ===
No.	Portrait	Name	Term start	Term end	Party
1		Ettore Martini	June 1951	July 1956	Christian Democracy
2		Alfredo Conti	July 1956	March 1958	Christian Democracy
3		Franco Giacoboni	June 1958	January 1961	Christian Democracy
4		Antonio Molinaroli	February 1961	March 1965	Christian Democracy
(3)		Franco Giacoboni	March 1965	April 1968	Christian Democracy
5		Giordano Persicani	April 1968	January 1969	Italian Socialist Party
6		Fiorenzo Tosi	January 1969	October 1975	Christian Democracy
(5)		Giordano Persicani	October 1975	October 1980	Italian Socialist Party
7		Luigi Tagliaferri	October 1980	August 1985	Italian Communist Party
8		Franco Benaglia	7 August 1985	11 August 1990	Italian Socialist Party
9		Maurizio Migliavacca	11 August 1990	24 January 1994	Italian Communist Party; Democratic Party of the Left
10		Renato Zurla	21 March 1994	8 May 1995	Italian Democratic Socialist Party
11		Dario Squeri	8 May 1995	28 June 1999	Independent (centre-left)
11		Dario Squeri	28 June 1999	28 June 2004	Independent (centre-left)
12		Gian Luigi Boiardi	28 June 2004	8 June 2009	Democrats of the Left; Democratic Party
13		Massimo Trespidi	8 June 2009	14 October 2014	The People of Freedom
14		Francesco Rolleri	14 October 2014	31 October 2018	Democratic Party
15		Patrizia Barbieri	31 October 2018	29 June 2022	Independent (centre-right)
—		Franco Albertini (acting)	29 June 2022	25 September 2022	Civic list
16		Monica Patelli	25 September 2022	Incumbent	Independent (centre-left)

== Sources ==
- "Storia amministrativa dell'ente". Ministero dell'Interno.
- "Albo dei Presidenti". Province of Piacenza. Archived from the original on 2021-05-18.
- Fornasari, Paola (2011). La Provincia di Piacenza e il suo archivio (1860–1970) (PDF). Piacenza. Archived from the original on 2022-03-17.
- Menichini, Piera (2005). "I presidenti delle Province dall'Unità alla Grande guerra: repertorio analitico". Storia Amministrazione Costituzione (13).
