= Massimo Trespidi =

President of the Province of Piacenza
- In office 9 June 2009 – 14 October 2014
- Preceded by: Gian Luigi Boiardi
- Succeeded by: Francesco Rolleri

Personal details
- Born: 12 July 1960 (age 66) Castel San Giovanni, Province of Piacenza, Italy
- Education: University of Pavia
- Occupation: Teacher

Massimo Trespidi (born 12 July 1960) is an Italian politician who served as president of the Province of Piacenza from 2009 to 2014.

== Life and career ==
Trespidi graduated in philosophy from the University of Pavia in 1984 and later worked as a high school teacher of philosophy and history.

A member of Communion and Liberation since 1975, he began his political career with Christian Democracy, serving as deputy mayor and councillor in Castel San Giovanni between 1985 and 1990.

He later joined Forza Italia and became deputy mayor of Piacenza (1998–2002). In 2009 he was elected president of the Province of Piacenza, defeating the incumbent Gian Luigi Boiardi in the first round of voting.

After leaving office in 2014, Trespidi returned to teaching. He later ran for mayor of Piacenza in 2017 and was elected city councillor. In 2022 he was re-elected to the city council.

Since 2023 he has been president of the Giuseppe Nicolini Conservatory in Piacenza.
