= Spaggiari =

Spaggiari (Italian pronunciation: [spadˈdʒaːri]) is an Italian surname.

Notable people with this surname include:

- Albert Spaggiari (1932–1989), French criminal
- Antonella Spaggiari (born 1957), Italian politician
- Bruno Spaggiari (born 1933), Italian motorcycle racer
