= Campioli =

Campioli is an Italian surname. Notable people with the surname include:

- Cesare Campioli (1902–1971), Italian politician and businessman
- Filippo Campioli (born 1982), Italian former high jumper

== See also ==
- Campoli
- Ciampoli
