= Cavazzoli =

Fraction of Reggio Emilia, Emilia-Romagna, Italy

- Frazione
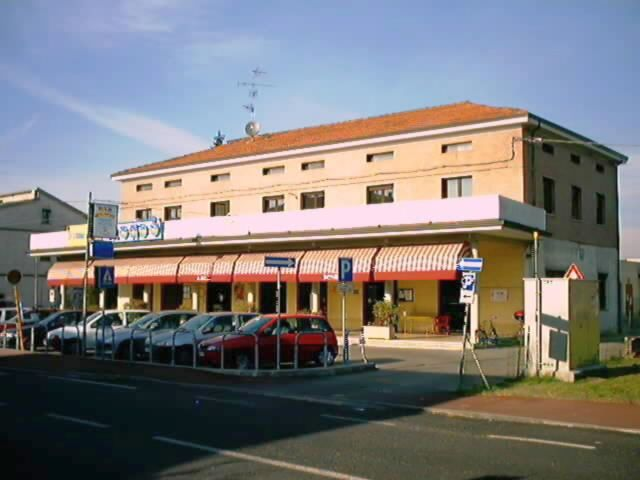
- The Arci Rondò Club in the center of Cavazzoli
- Interactive map of Cavazzoli
- Country: Italy
- Region: Emilia-Romagna
- Province: Reggio Emilia
- Municipality: Reggio nell'Emilia

Area Parish boundaries
  - Total: 3.3 km^{2} (1.3 sq mi)

Population (31/12/2019)Data from the Municipality of Reggio Emilia
  - Total: 1,378
- Demonym: Cavazzolesi
- Postal code: RE

Cavazzoli or Villa Cavazzoli (I Cavasō in Reggiano dialect; De Cavazzolis in Latin) is a frazione (Note: The fractions of the city of Reggio Emilia, as in other Italian municipalities, are also called villas, which often serve as a prefix to the official toponym. During the 1900s, those closest to the historic center became city neighborhoods. This is the case for the portion of Cavazzoli's territory located south of the Milan–Bologna railway.) of the municipality of Reggio Emilia with 1,378 inhabitants, now a small northwestern extension of the urban area of Reggio. (Note: Since 1981, Istat has included the settlement of Cavazzoli within the larger urban area of Reggio nell'Emilia. In Italy, geographic fractions have not been used as statistical units since the 1991 Census of Italy.)

The fraction is the birthplace of Cesare Campioli, the first mayor of Reggio Emilia after the Liberation, the silver medal of the Resistance Paolo Davoli, and the tenor Ferruccio Tagliavini.

Locally, according to tradition, the remains of Saint Julius the Martyr rest, contained in a transparent reliquary in the namesake oratory located in the Valle di San Giulio.

== Geography ==
The settlement is located in an area of medium plain 3 km from the city center, in the northwestern part of the municipal territory, between the Milan–Bologna railway, the Guazzatoio canal, and the Crostolo stream. It borders to the north with the fraction of Sesso (Reggio Emilia); to the east with Sesso and San Prospero Strinati; to the south with the commercial zone and to the west with Pieve Modolena and Roncocesi.

== Origin of the name ==
The toponym Cavazzoli is likely a hydronymToponym related to or associated with a watercourse dating back to the Late Middle Ages, derived from the Latin cavus 'hollow' with the suffix -aciu or -atiu functioning as a noun indicating a 'depression,' that is, 'the bed of a watercourse.' It is probable that the watercourse in question could be the paleochannel of the Crostolo stream that flowed west of its current path.It is likely that the paleochannel follows the path of the current Cavo Guazzatore (or Guazzatoio). In the municipal territory of Reggio Emilia, the same toponymic origin characterizes the fractions of Gavassa and Gavasseto.

== History ==
The earliest human settlements identified in the Cavazzoli area date back to the recent Bronze Age (14th–12th century BC). This is evidenced by the terramara discovered by Gaetano Chierici in the early second half of the 19th century in the Crostolo riverbed near the bridge of the Milan–Bologna national railway line, with artifacts now housed in the Civic Museums of Reggio. Not far from there, in the locality of La Palazzina, a fragment of a Roman tombstone was found.

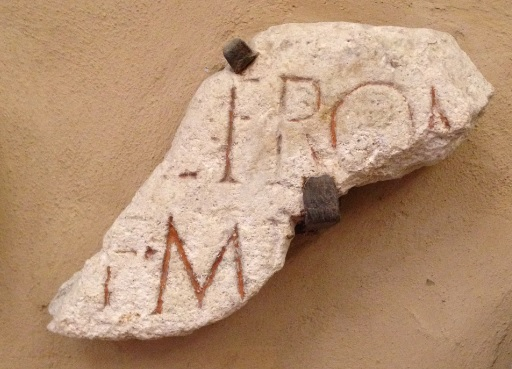
Fragment of a Roman tombstone found in the La Palazzina locality, near the walnut grove of Rete 2, now preserved in the Civic Museums

The locality is mentioned for the first time in a document from 1330, which also mentions an early oratory dedicated to Saint Gregory. The 1458 Estimo assigns 15 hearths (families) to the village, roughly 100 inhabitants. The territory of Cavazzoli was once also called Borghi di Santo Stefano or Borgo Santo Stefano, taking its name from the gate of the city of Reggio located on the Via Emilia toward Parma.

In Cavazzoli, toward the end of the 19th century, due to the strong spread of socialist ideas, one of the first consumer cooperatives in the Reggio area was established. The cooperative ideal, both socialist and Catholic, and the dense network of sharecroppers and small landowner farmers led in the 1920s to the creation of the social dairy and, in 1937, the social winery.

In this village, in 1921, following the split of the communist faction from the Italian Socialist Party, the FGCI (Italian Communist Youth Federation) was born. Natives of Cavazzoli included the martyr of the Resistance, partisan, and communist militant Paolo Davoli, and his friend Cesare Campioli, anti-fascist and partisan, who had to emigrate to the Paris banlieue to escape fascist persecution and, after the Liberation, became mayor of Reggio for 17 years. In the annex of the Villa Ottavi-Terrachini, then in Cavazzoli’s territory, the famous Reggio tenor Ferruccio Tagliavini was also born. Other natives of the village of Cavazzoli include: the landscape painter Paolo Ferretti (1822–1904); Dante Montanari (1890–1966, chief engineer of the Municipality of Reggio and president of the Province of Reggio Emilia from 1951 to 1964); Ferruccio Orlandini (1896–1983, sculptor). During the Liberation war, the village was the scene of a tragic event. On the morning of November 20, 1944, the Cavazzoli massacre occurred: a local resident found the bodies of four men in a ditch just outside the village, along the road to Roncocesi, evidently tortured before being killed or dying under torture. During the Second World War, between December 1943 and March 1944, Cavazzoli was the site of the provincial concentration camp of Reggio Emilia. To host it, the fascist administration seized the Nobili family’s manor, located in the current via Campioli. Several prisoners passed through it, including Reggio and foreign Jews, later deported to Birkenau and Bergen-Belsen.

With the urban growth of the city of Reggio, Villa Cavazzoli changed its fractional boundaries starting from the post-war period (Note: The first neighborhood built in the immediate post-war period was Regina Pacis, which incorporated the already existing IACP Le Delizie Village of Villa Cavazzoli in via Pietro Mascagni.) to the 1960s. (Note: During that period, the parish of San Pio X was established, and the massive urbanization of the Carrozzone-Betonica area continued, completed in the 1990s., thus retaining less than half of its original territorial area. It should not be forgotten that until the mid-20th century, the territory of the village of Cavazzoli had a territorial area of 7.4 sq m.) According to population estimates from the 1936 Diocesan Yearbook reported in Il Pescatore Reggiano of that year, the Cavazzoli parish, which then extended over a territory of over 7.4 km², had about 7,000 inhabitants, stretching from north to south along the western outskirts of the city outside Porta Santo Stefano.

In this vast, predominantly agricultural area dotted with farmhouses, the country estates of the great Reggio bourgeois and aristocratic families Ottavi, Terrachini, Toschi, and Nobili were located, along with several charitable institutions that were previously convents and monasteries. Until the 1960s, the village’s territory also included a large urban area, now fully integrated into the city’s urban fabric, extending south of the Milan–Bologna railway. To the east, the boundary was Porta Santo Stefano, to the west the Guazzatore canal, and to the south the Enza canal. Today, the toponym Cavazzoli (Note: Of the historic territory of the old Villa Cavazzoli, in addition to the current settlement of Cavazzoli, the neighborhoods of Carrozzone-Betonica (including the Commercial Zone), Spirito Santo-Orologio, and Regina Pacis are part. The territories of the ancient village located on the right bank of the Crostolo, outside Porta Santo Stefano, were annexed to the city parish of Santo Stefano in the 1930s.) uniquely identifies the territory of the All Saints parish, sometimes referred to as Cavazzoli Nord.

In the early 1950s, with the contribution of local volunteers, the new cooperative building was constructed, including: a multipurpose hall with a cinema, headquarters for left-wing parties, and a bar-restaurant that opened as a social theater with a concert by the Cavazzoli soprano Elsa Camellini. In 1969, the building was renovated and transformed into the current Arci Rondò Club, still operational today.

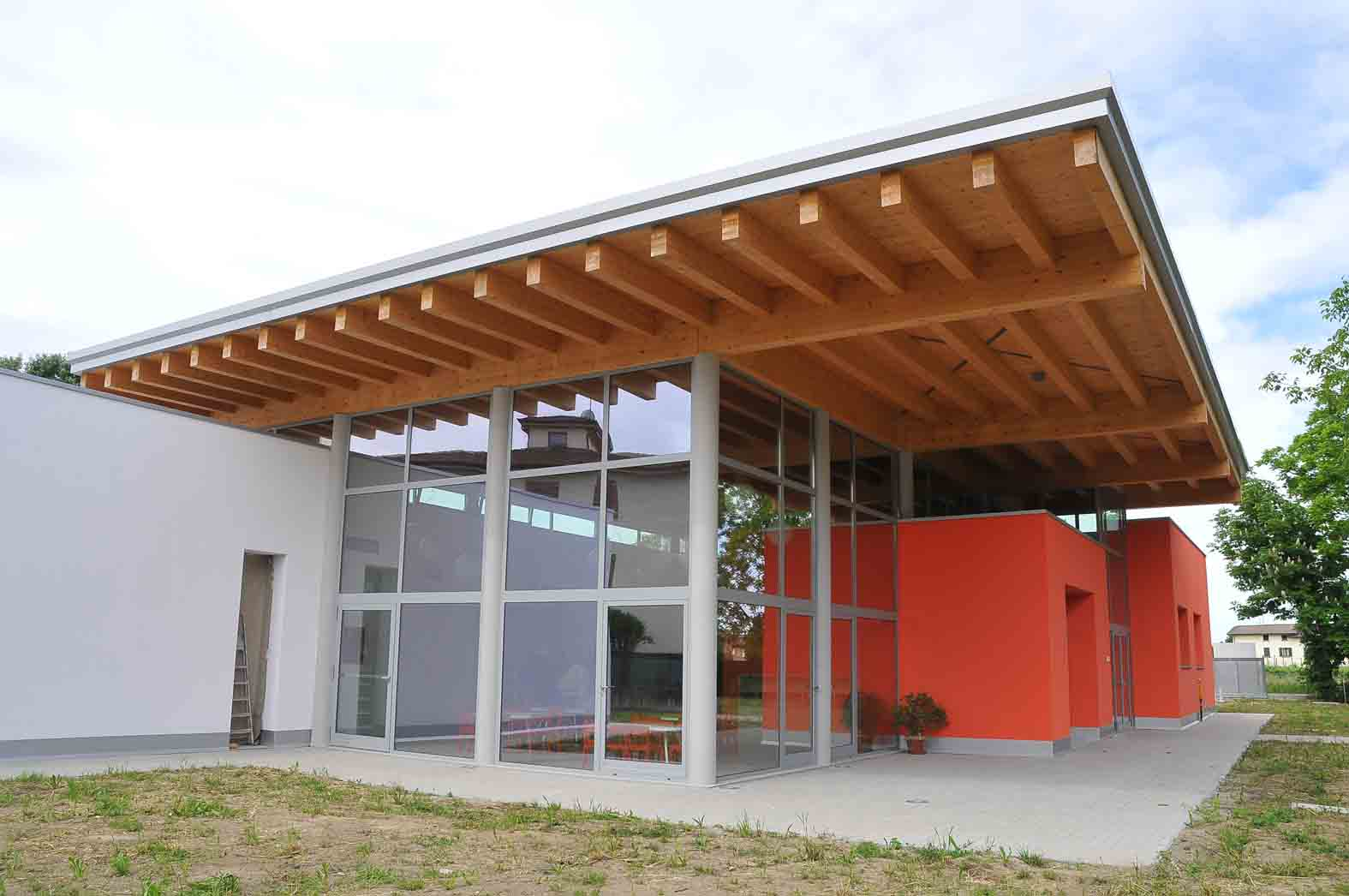
The new kindergarten with spring nursery

In the 1990s, Cavazzoli lost its identity as a small local community: the sharp population decline of the 1970s and 1980s, the abandonment of the countryside, and increased mobility led to the closure of all commercial activities. In 1991, due to the low number of resident children, the elementary school closed its doors. However, from the mid-1990s, construction activity resumed, bringing the population to current levels, although this did not lead to the revival of commercial activities. Nevertheless, the significant population increase prompted the local parish and the city administration, then led by Graziano Delrio, to build a nursery-kindergarten, inaugurated in 2014 and a symbol of the fraction’s revival.

== Monuments and places of interest ==
=== Religious architecture ===
Currently, Cavazzoli’s religious buildings are limited to the parish church and the Oratory of Saint Julius. In the past, during the period of maximum territorial extension of the villa, other religious buildings and several votive shrines were present, all located in the current neighborhoods of Carrozzone, Regina Pacis neighbourhood, and Orologio.

- All Saints' Parish Church, Cavazzoli
- Oratory of San Giulio martire

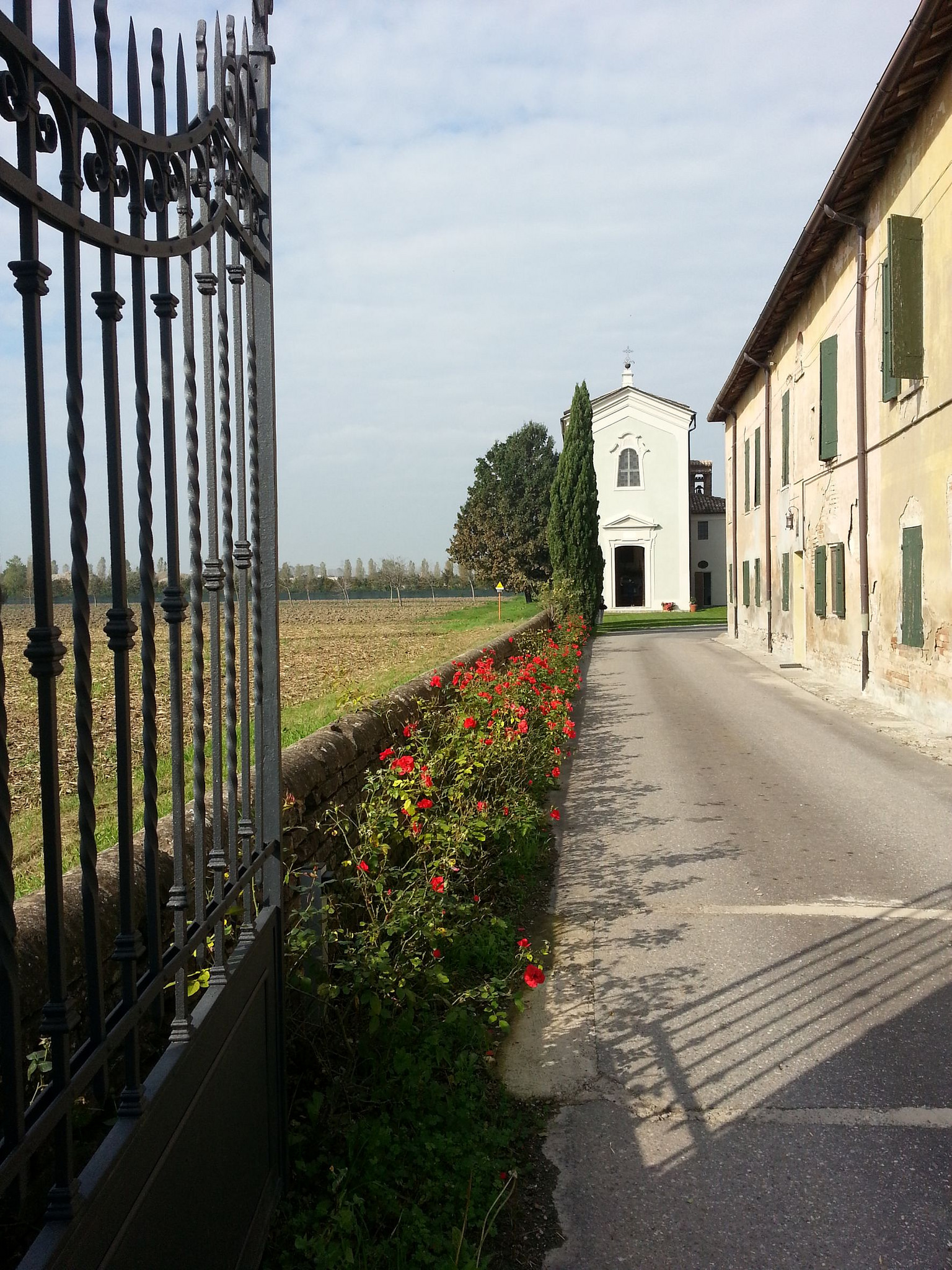
Entrance to the agricultural courtyard and the church of Saint Julius

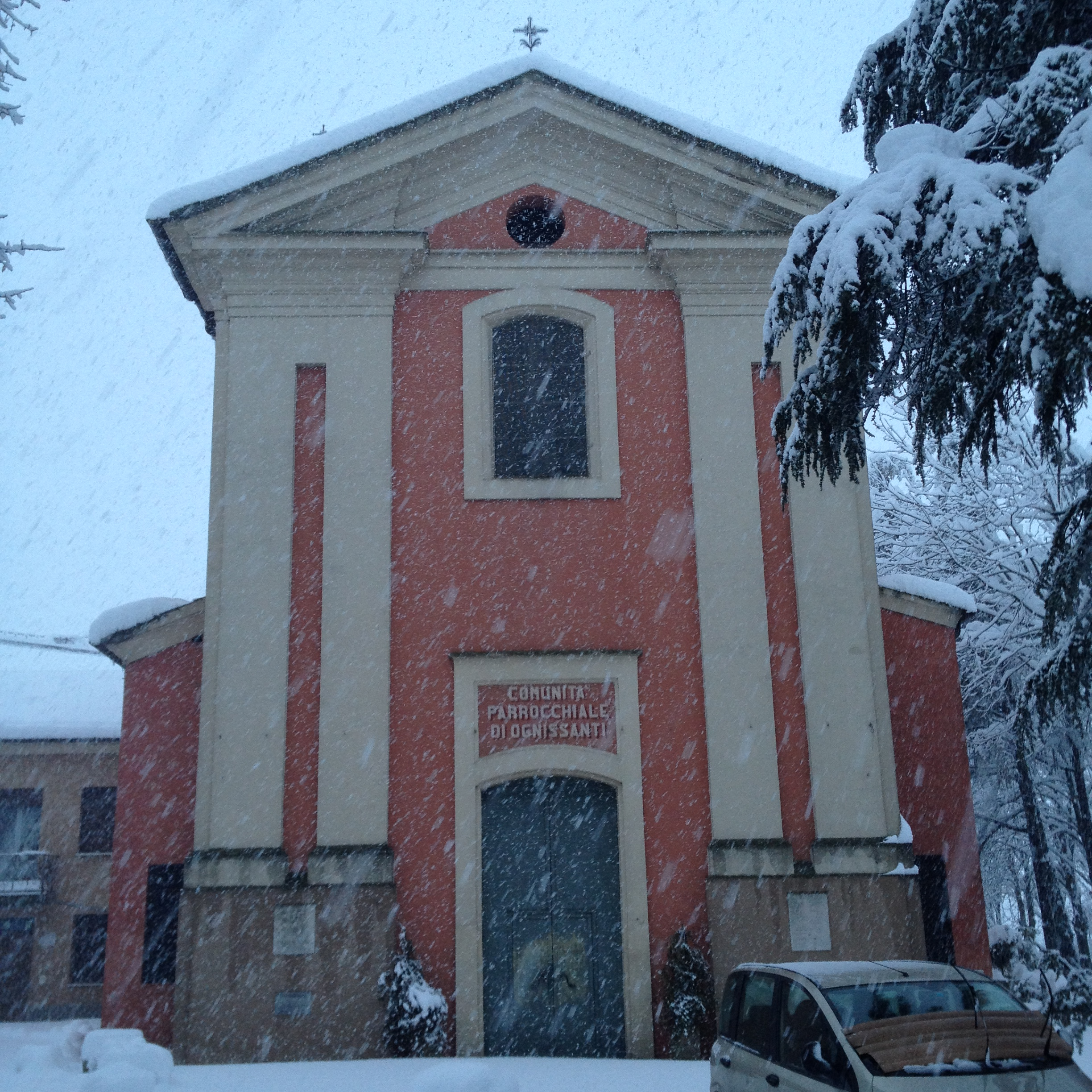
The parish church of All Saints under snow

=== Civil architecture ===
Most of the civil buildings of historical or architectural value are linked to the rural architecture of the territory. Also noteworthy is an important example of modern architecture related to technological services (Rete 2).

- Nobili Manor, via Cesare Campioli (18th century).
- Soncini Houses, via Cesare Campioli (18th century).
- Ancient octagonal cheese factory, via Guernica (18th century).
- Former Parisetti Charitable Institution/Farmstead ECA, via Guernica (17th century–18th century).
- Gatti Houses, via Giovanni Rinaldi (17th–18th century).
- Barchi Houses, via Errico Malatesta (18th century).
- Monument to the fallen for freedom (Cavazzoli massacre), via Giovanni Rinaldi (1946).
- Rete 2 district heating plant - Turbogas, via Hiroshima (1999).

=== Archaeological sites ===
- Terramara of Cavazzoli, via Cesare Campioli (Bronze Age).

=== Natural areas ===
Cavazzoli’s agricultural landscape is part of the historic reclamation and derived water systems and hydraulic works, managed by the Emilia Centrale Reclamation Consortium. To the east, it is bordered by the Crostolo river park, accessible on foot or by bicycle through the namesake naturalistic walkway.

==== Gardens ====
- Private garden of the Nobili Manor ('Il Palazzone'), via Cesare Campioli

==== Parks ====
- Tre Noci Park, via Carlo Pergreffi (Note: Partisan from Roncocesi who died following an Allied bombing in 1944)
- Crostolo Walkway - Dante Montanari

== Society ==
The population of Cavazzoli experienced a sharp decline between the mid-1960s and the 1990s, dropping from 1,300 inhabitants in 1963 to 637 in 1972, 613 in 1984, rising to 807 in 1997, and reaching 1,378 in 2019. (Note: Data from the Statistics Office of the Municipality of Reggio Emilia.)

The aging index is lower than the municipal average (105 versus 137), and the birth rate is similar to the overall city figure (8 versus 8). The average number of family members is higher than the general municipal figure (2.4 members versus 2.2).

Foreigners account for 11.6% (compared to 16.8% for the entire municipality) and mostly come from Nigeria, Ukraine, and Moldova.

=== Tradition and folklore ===
- Good Friday
- Feast of Saint Julius Martyr, last Sunday of August
- Feast of the Most Holy Name of Mary, second Sunday of September
- Feast of All Saints, November 1

=== Institutions, organizations, and associations ===
- Cooperative Rondò, via Giovanni Rinaldi
- ANPI Cavazzoli-Betonica Section
- San Giulio-Cavazzoli Nord Irrigation Consortium, via San Giulio

== Culture ==
The fraction hosts several educational and cultural institutions. There are no primary or lower secondary school facilities: those responsible for the territory are the Vasco Agosti primary school in San Prospero Strinati for the urban area and the Roncocesi state primary school for the western rural area, although the closest elementary school is Giacomo Leopardi (formerly Pieve 2) in via John Fitzgerald Kennedy. The lower secondary school responsible for Cavazzoli’s territory is the Enrico Fermi middle school in the Gardenia neighborhood, though the Antonio Fontanesi state middle school is closer. Other educational and recreational centers include the parish oratory and the Arci Rondò Club.

=== Early childhood ===
- Kindergarten and spring nursery Maria Vergine Madre, via Giovanni Rinaldi

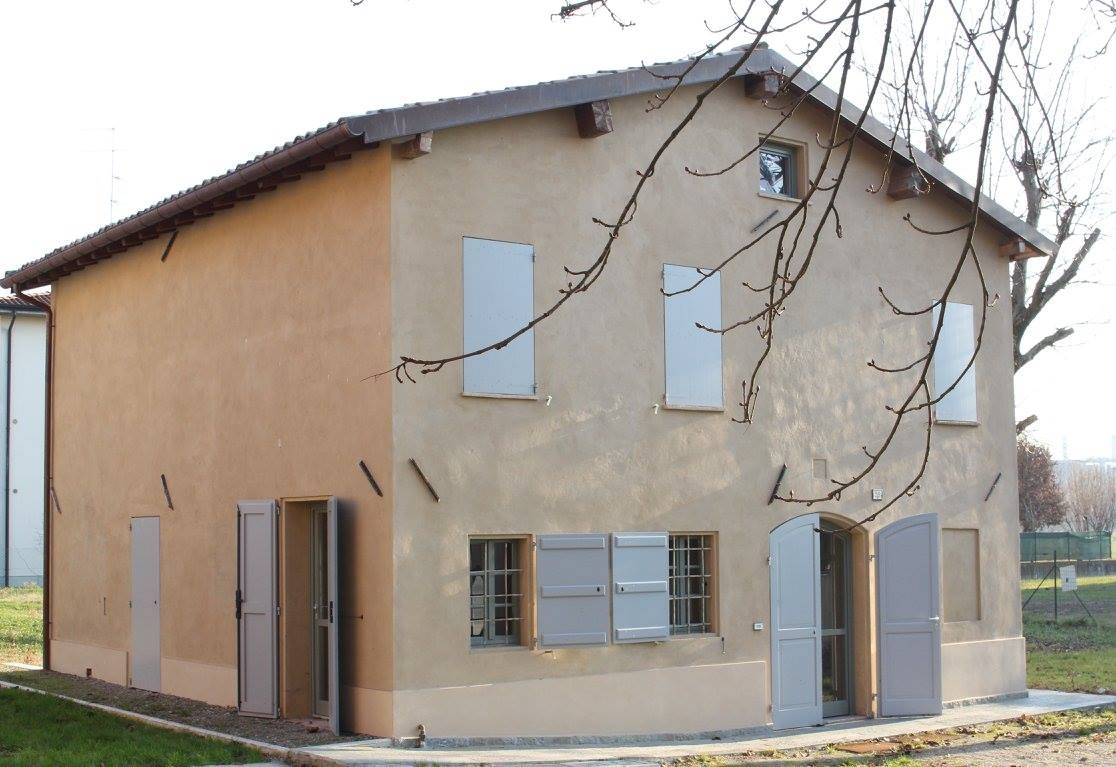
The former bell-ringer’s house, now the seat of the oratory

=== Extracurricular educational activities ===
- Parish oratory and former bell-ringer’s house, via Giovanni Rinaldi

=== Other ===
- Arci Rondò Club, via Giovanni Rinaldi, 45

=== Events ===
- Mediofondo del Porcellino - Memorial Augusto Strozzi e Milo Campioli, cycling rally FCI (May 1)
- REstate insieme in Cavazzoli (June–September)
- Inter-parish futsal tournament (July)
- Dialect theater series (October–March)

== Human geography ==
The urban area of Cavazzoli is partially included in the Crostolo stream agricultural park, located within a green wedge that extends between the Milan–Bologna railway and the watercourse.

The development of the current fraction, i.e., Cavazzoli Nord—excluding the large agglomeration absorbed by the central urban area of Reggio, located between via Gorizia, the Via Emilia, and the national railway—began only in the 1970s with the subdivision of via Pergreffi, then resumed significantly, after a period of stagnation, in the mid-1990s and slowed again at the dawn of the 2008 crisis, almost completely halting with the 2011 debt crisis.

The first major infrastructure built in the fraction, after the great reclamations and the canalization of the Crostolo in the 16th century, was the Milan–Bologna railway, inaugurated in 1859. In the 1920s, the extension of the municipal road of Cavazzoli or della Sbarra (now via Giovanni Rinaldi) to Roncocesi was completed. North of the Valle di San Giulio, near Case Barchi, the Autostrada del Sole was built, operational between Milan and Bologna since 1959. In 1965, via Rinaldi was paved for the first time, and in 1970, all other country roads, including the so-called viottolo di Mezzo, previously strada vicinale Toschi, then via Cornelio Bentivoglio, definitively named via Guernica since 1988. In 1970, the road bridge over the Crostolo stream on via Rinaldi was opened to traffic, and in 1984, via Hiroshima, the northern segment of the equipped axis crossing the city from north to south, was activated. In the early 1990s, greater attention was given to light mobility, leading to the completion of the bicycle bridge over the Crostolo stream of the Dante Montanari walkway, built in 1992 to replace the old footbridge that passed under the railway next to the former level crossing of via Cesare Campioli. Between 2000 and 2002, the cycle path within the Cavazzoli urban area was built, including the construction of the first two roundabouts in the villa. In 2006, the variant to the SS63 (viale Bice Bertani Davoli) was completed, linked to the construction of the TAV Milan–Bologna, operational since 2008. Between 2009 and 2011, the cycle path connecting to the Via Emilia was built. The last significant public work dates to 2014 and concerns the cycle path to Roncocesi, part of the Ciclovia 8, named after Alfonsina Strada. In 2019, a new bicycle bridge over the Crostolo stream was built, connecting the stream’s containment embankment to the Villaggio Crostolo industrial area (Sesso).

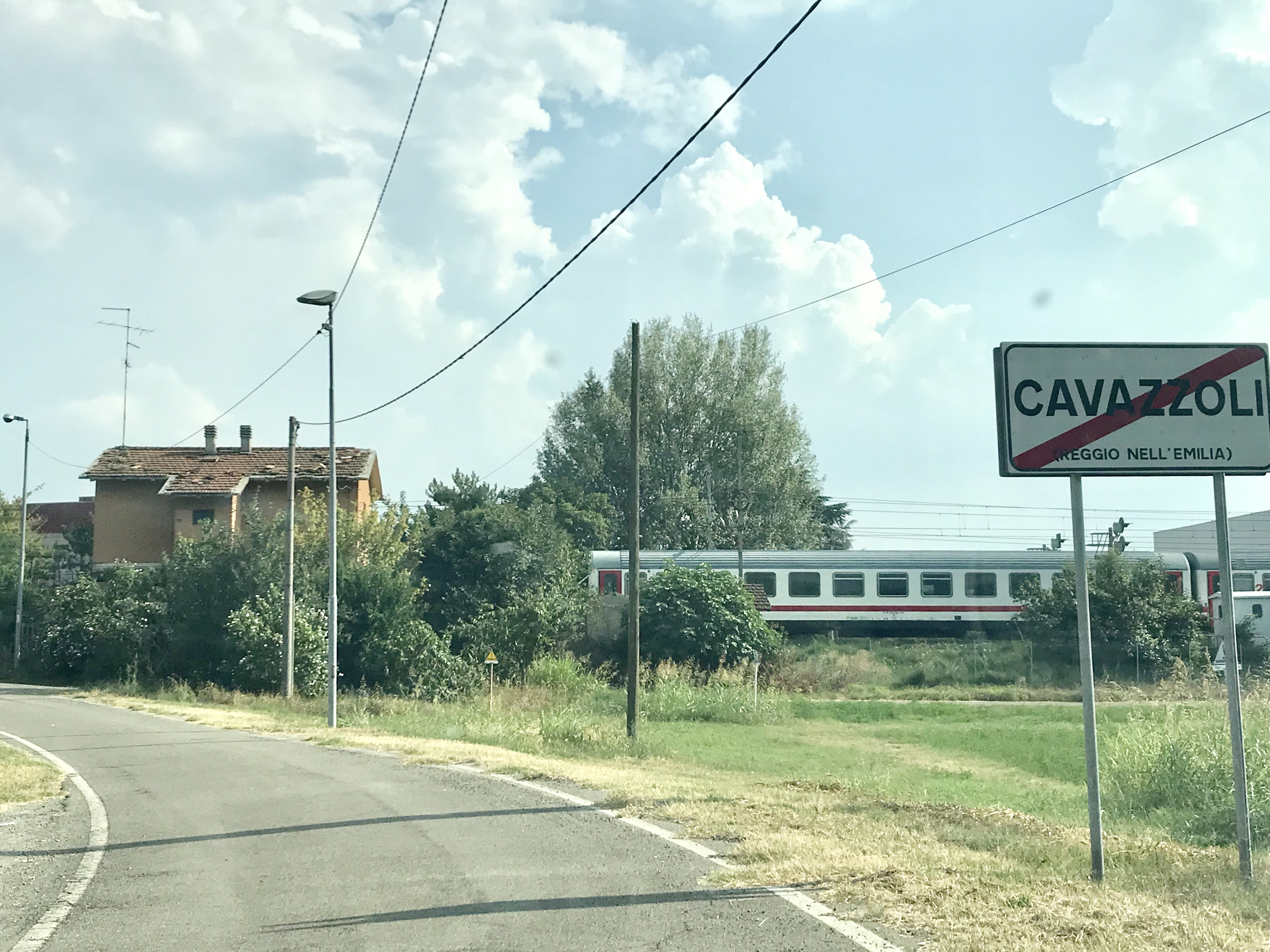
Frecciabianca passing through the former level crossing of via Campioli

The urban fabric of the fraction is mostly characterized by sparse buildings at the center of the lot. Urbanized areas account for 7% of the territorial surface, though inhabited by 77% of the population (at the municipal level, 92% of the population lives there). 93% of Cavazzoli’s territory is predominantly agricultural (the overall municipal figure is 80%), dotted with scattered houses. 23% of the population resides there (at the municipal level, the percentage is 8%). This shows that, unlike the municipal average, more people live in the countryside in Cavazzoli.

With the 1999–2001 general regulatory plan, later confirmed with the 2009–2011 structural plan and the Building regulations, new construction areas were planned for the settlement through detailed plan and completion zones, totaling about 100 new housing units, which would have led to the creation of the fraction’s first public park through the practice of urban equalization and a small area designated for retail trade, which completely disappeared in the early 1990s.

In the 2020s, Cavazzoli will be affected by the completion of a 6.5 km section, between San Prospero Strinati and Corte Tegge, of the Northern Bypass of Reggio Emilia.

== Economy ==
The fraction has a predominantly residential and agricultural vocation. It mainly hosts residents working in the industrial and service areas of the city and province. There are a few productive activities located along the main road, related to inert waste disposal, food processing, metal constructions, binding, and graphics. Until the early 1990s, two cooperative workshops for processing agricultural products, primarily dairy products related to the production of Parmigiano Reggiano, The San Giulio social dairy of Cavazzoli closed in 2006 and winemaking, The Cavazzoli cooperative winery, part of Cantine Riunite, closed in 1992. The building was later sold and converted into a powdered milk and other products factory. related to the Lambrusco supply chain, were present. In the fraction, in the Valle di San Giulio, the only large livestock farmThe only intensive cattle breeding farm remaining in Cavazzoli active in Cavazzoli’s territory is present, which, until the 1980s, was characterized by small family-run farms. There are also public and private areas dedicated to personal services, including: urban district heating services, initial hospitality residential services, neuropsychiatric residential services, and early childhood services.

== Infrastructure and transport ==
=== Mobility ===
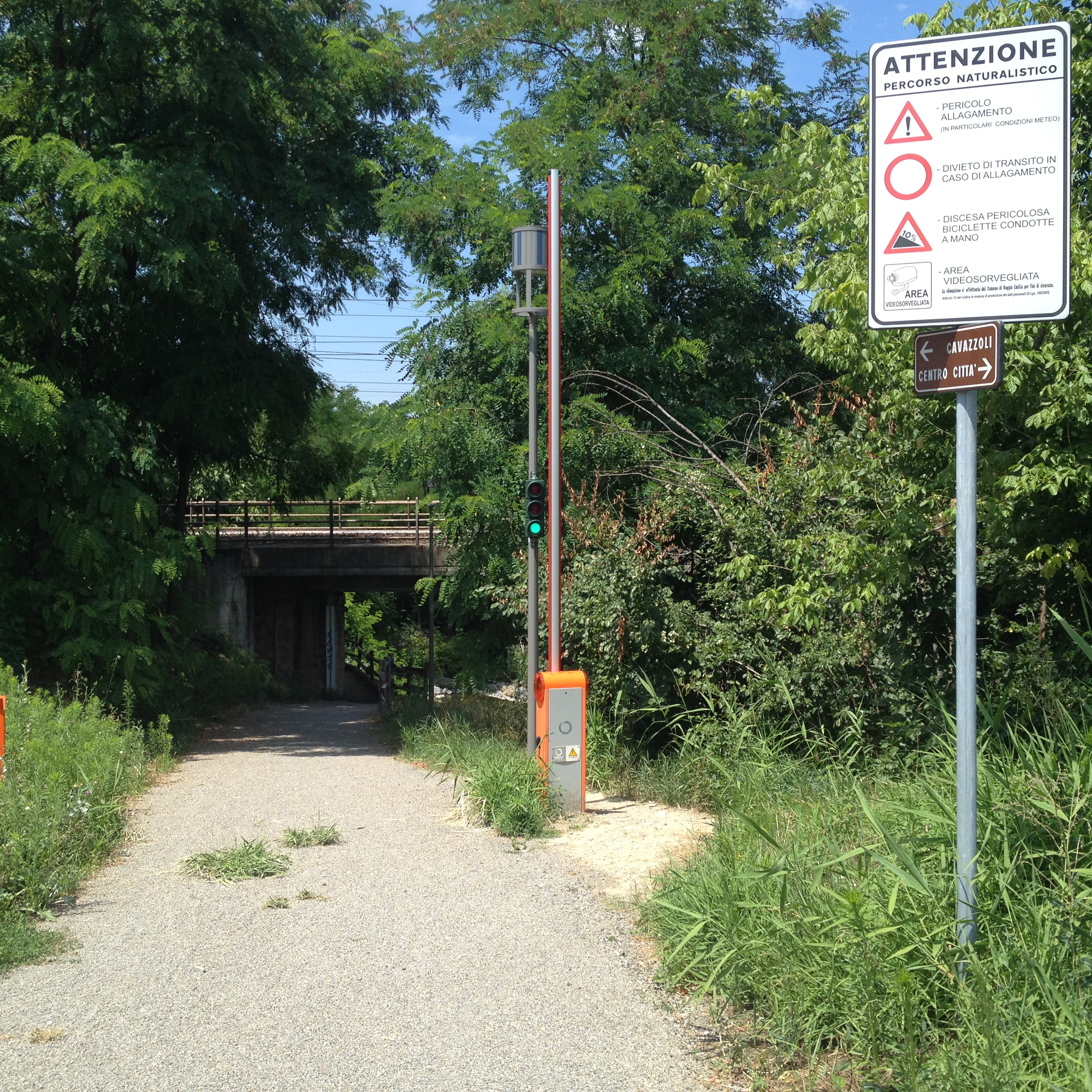
The underpass pedestrian and cycle path of the Crostolo walkway south of the Milan–Bologna railway

The fraction is located near the city’s major transit routes and is crossed by several cycle paths, including the Ciclovia 8 connecting Roncocesi to the historic center of the capital and the naturalistic walkway flanking the Crostolo stream. In the future, it will be at the center of an important road junction, marked by the interchange between the upcoming extension of the Northern Bypass of Reggio Emilia and the equipped axis.

The settlement is served by a low-frequency urban public transport line of the city of Reggio Emilia, operated by the Società Emiliana Trasporti Autofiloviari.

The territorial area is crossed by significant national mobility networks, though they have no exits or stops locally:

- Milan–Bologna railway
- High-Speed Milan–Bologna Railway
- Autostrada del Sole

=== Technological infrastructure ===
South of the villa settlement is the Rete 2 turbogas plant, managed by Iren. This district heating plant for the city has been operational since 1988. On the eastern border of the fraction, already in Sesso’s territory, from 1968 to 2012, the provincial incinerator of Reggio Emilia operated, now decommissioned.

The peripheral location of the fraction and low human impact over time have led to the presence of a dense network of Terna power lines of local and national significance, including those supplying the RFI railway network.

== Sports ==
Grassroots sports have always been present in Cavazzoli, albeit in amateur form. The main disciplines include football, futsal, bowls, and cycle touring.

=== Football ===
The sports teams based in Cavazzoli currently active are:

- The FalkGalileo Asd, which has 22 teams in various championships, from the youngest to the first team participating in the regional FIGC Promozione championship
- The Rondò, a football team founded in 1975, competing in provincial amateur UISP and Centro Sportivo Italiano championships

In the 1970s, the parish hosted the Mamo Cavazzoli, a youth football team registered in the provincial CSI championships.

=== Cycle touring ===
Since 1969, the G.S. Rondò, a cycle touring team affiliated with UISP, has been active, founded by several volunteers from the namesake Arci club in Cavazzoli.

=== Sports facilities ===
The only sports facility in the fraction is the Cesare Campioli Sports Center, once private and equipped with a guesthouse, known as the Sporting Club, and now municipally owned. The fields, which include a small gym, have also hosted significant training sessions of national football clubs visiting the city, including Milan and Atalanta. In 2019–2020, it hosted the training sessions of Reggiana. It is managed by the FalkGalileo Asd and includes a small football school.

Other small playing fields are present in the parish area, at Tre Noci Park, and, in the past, at the Arci Rondò Club.

Since 1978, the former coach of Reggiana and Polisportiva Brescello, Cesare Vitale, has resided in the fraction.

== Image gallery ==
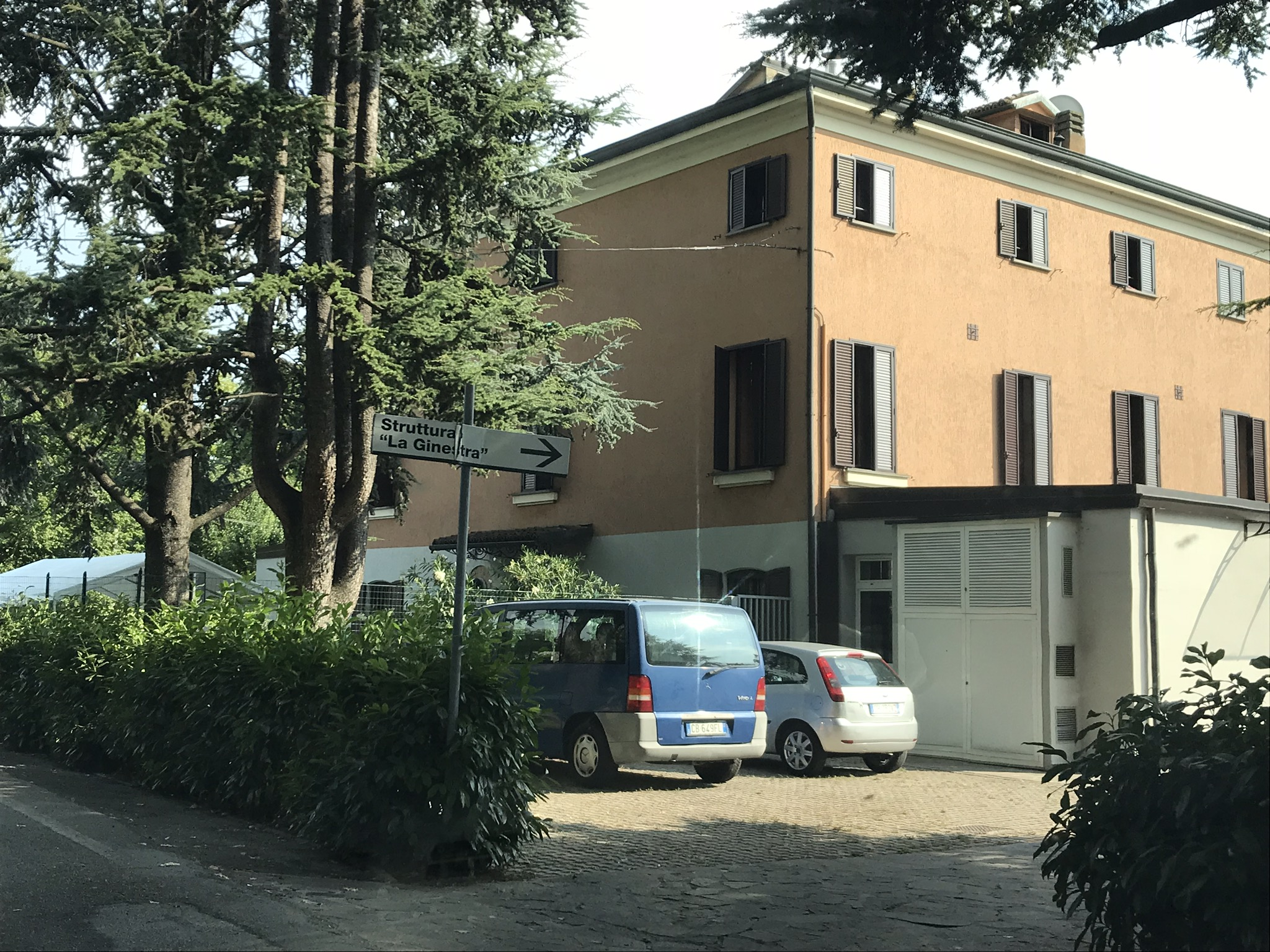
Nursing home La Ginestra

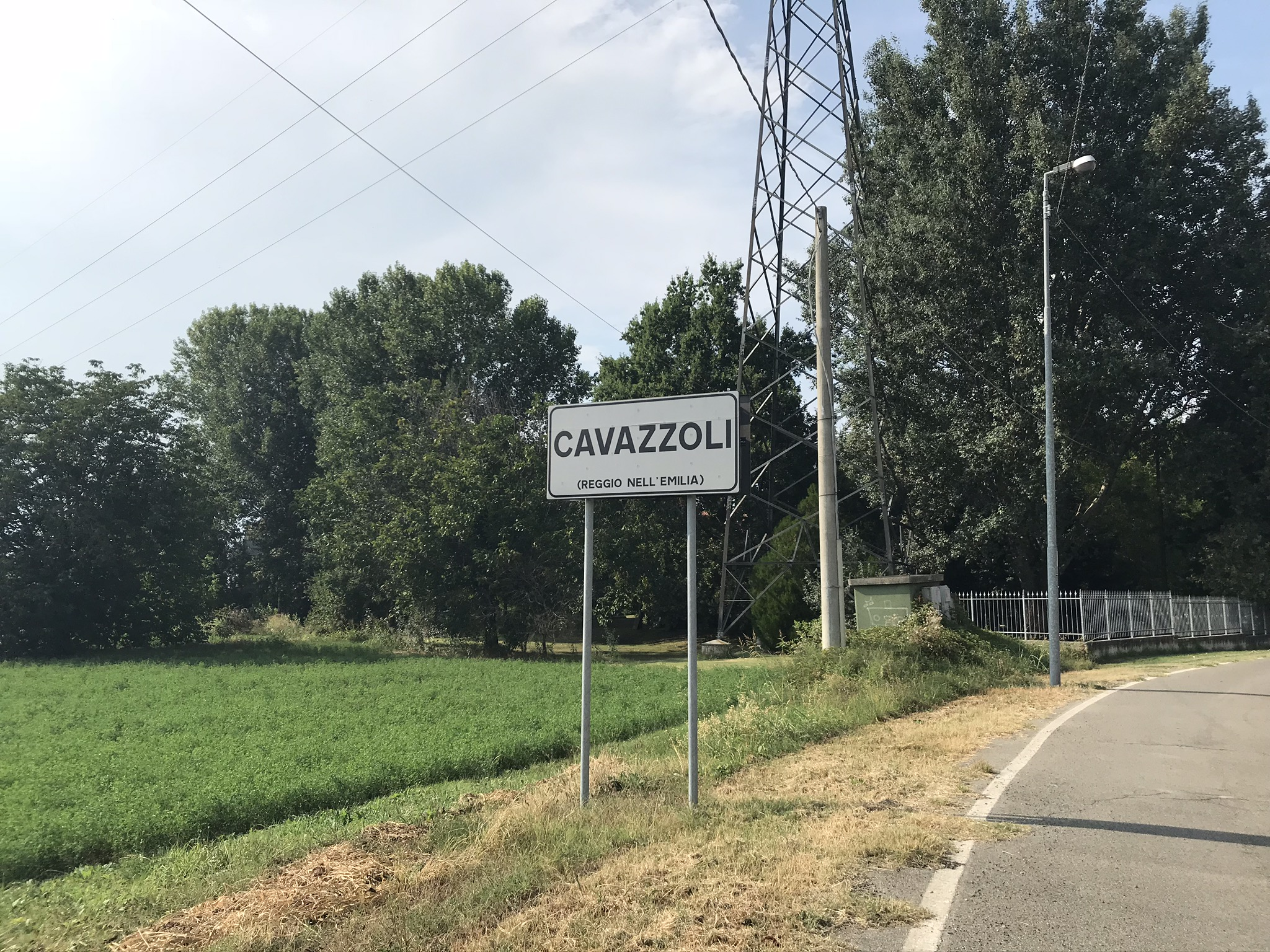
Entrance to the Cavazzoli urban area from via Campioli

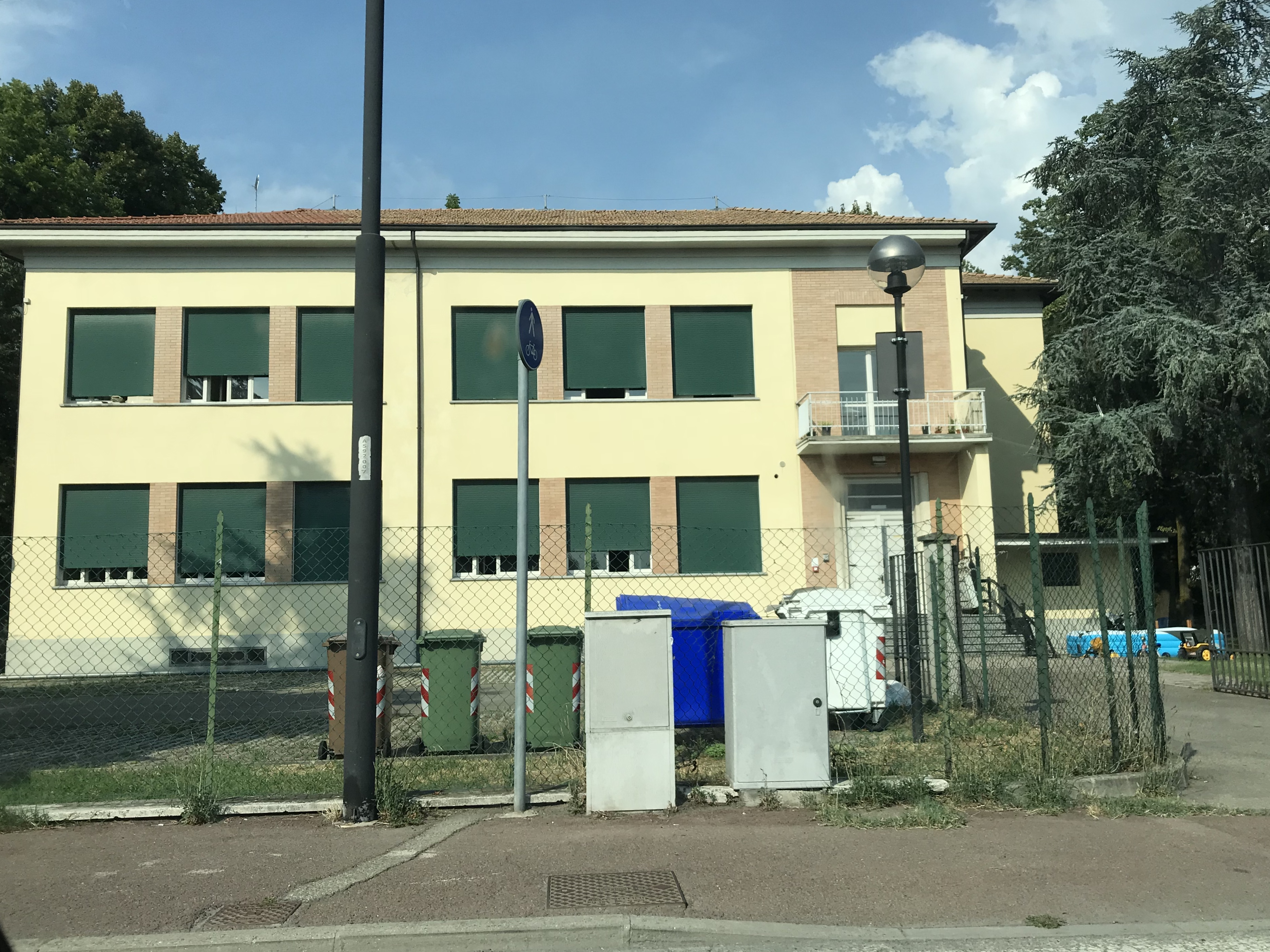
Former Cavazzoli elementary school (now Pensionato Cavazzoli)

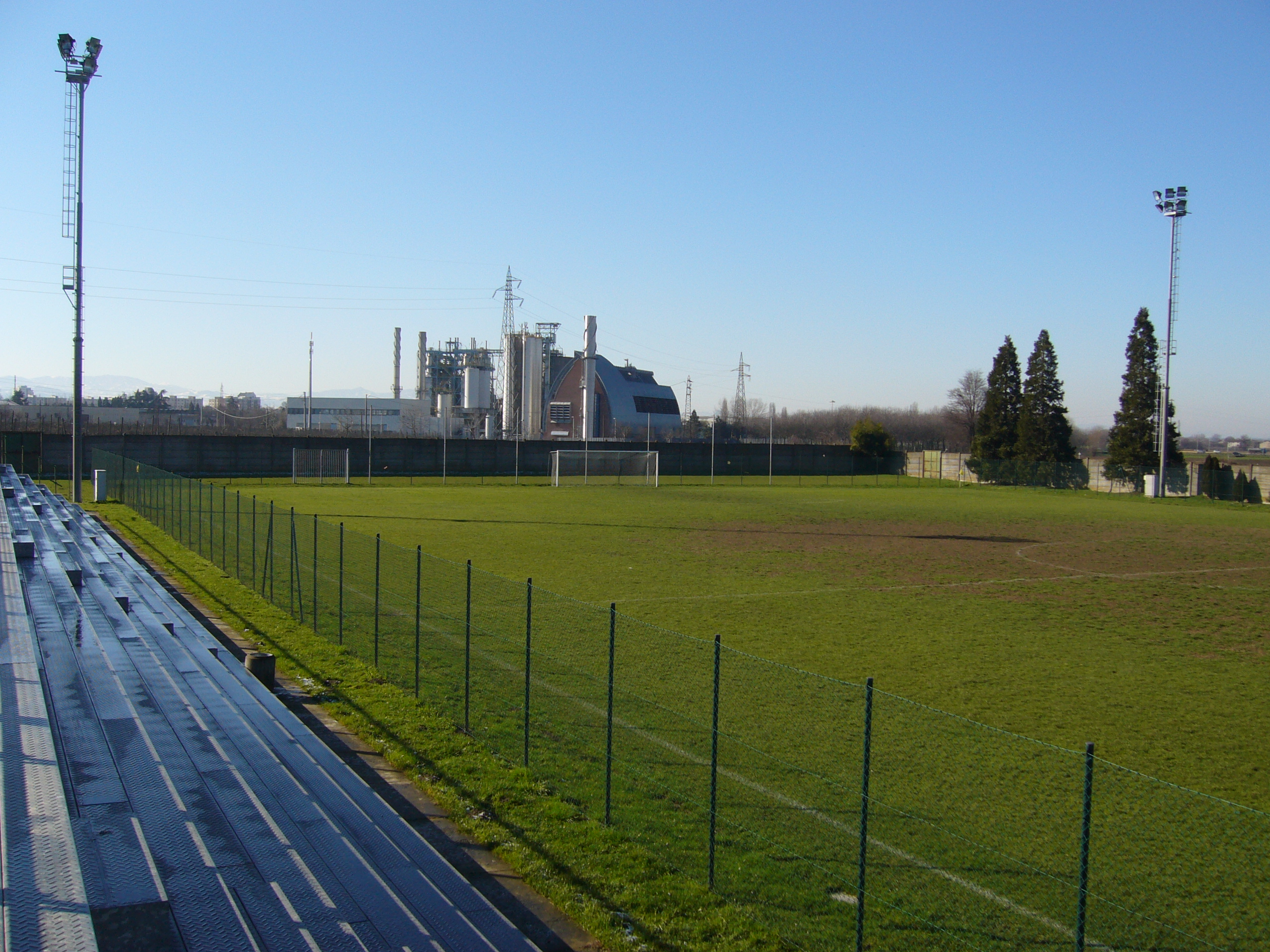
The sports field ex Sporting in via Campioli. In the background, the district heating Rete 2 plant

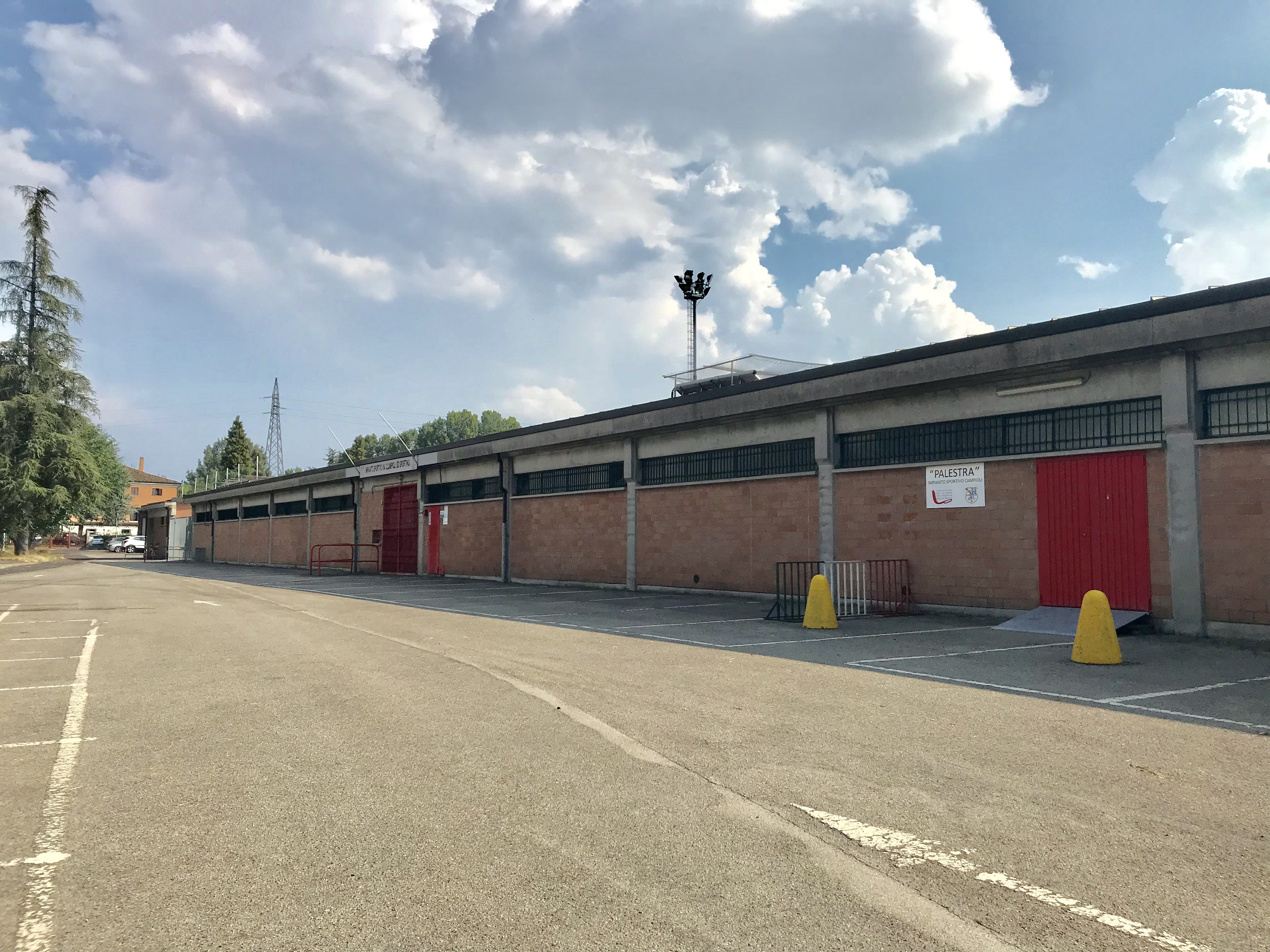
Cesare Campioli sports field, entrance

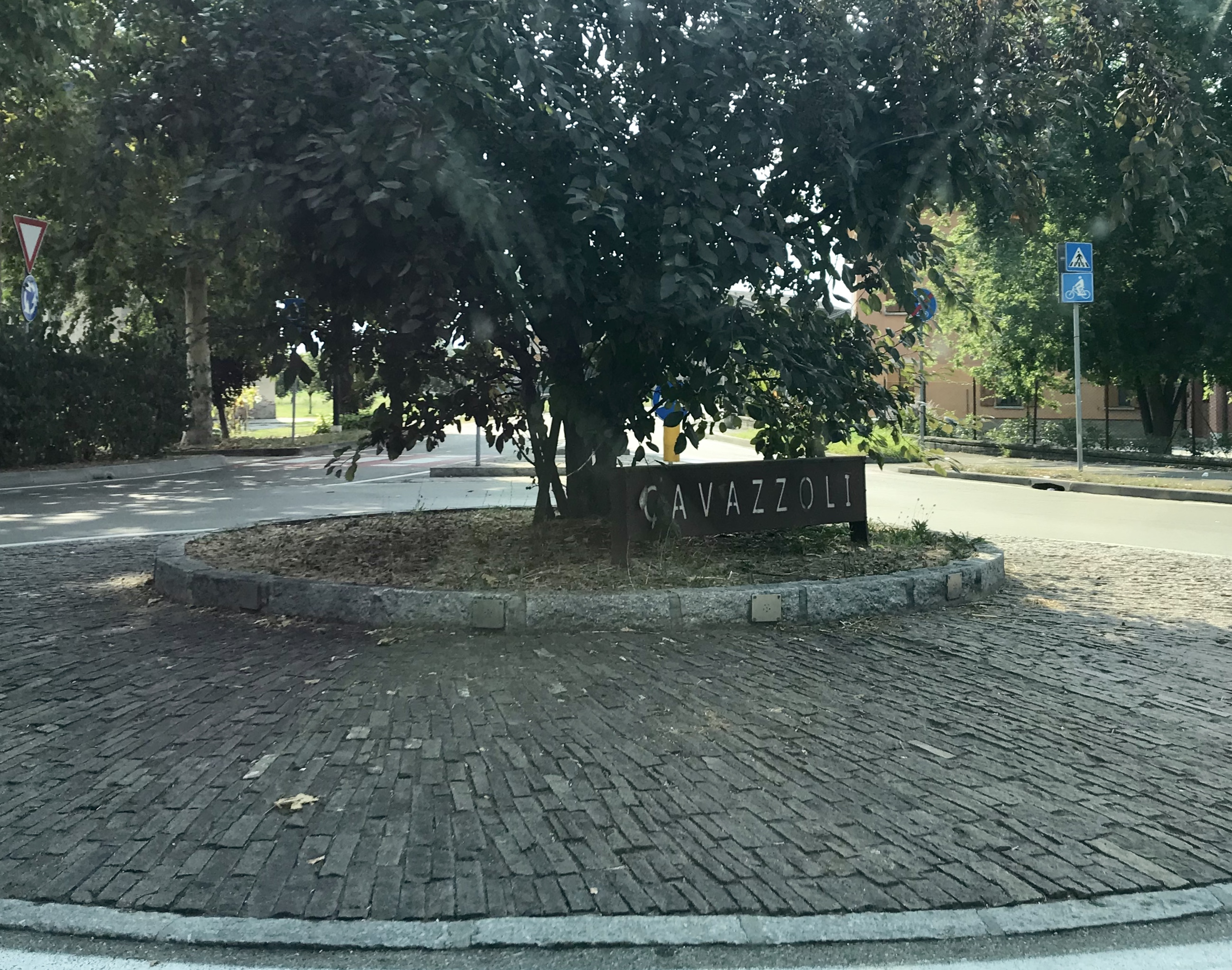
Cavazzoli entrance portal
