= Renzo Bonazzi =

Italian politician and lawyer

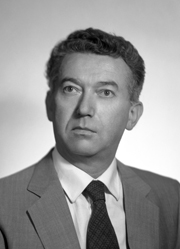

Mayor of Reggio Emilia
- In office 17 May 1962 – 12 May 1976
- Preceded by: Cesare Campioli
- Succeeded by: Ugo Benassi

Member of the Senate
- In office 5 July 1976 – 1 July 1987

Personal details
- Born: 27 January 1925 Reggio Emilia, Italy
- Died: 2 April 2010 (aged 85) Reggio Emilia, Italy
- Party: Italian Communist Party
- Spouse: Marisa Bonazzi
- Occupation: lawyer

Renzo Bonazzi (27 January 1925 – 2 April 2010) was an Italian politician and lawyer.

He was a member of the Italian Communist Party. He served as Mayor of Reggio Emilia from 1962 to 1976.

He was elected to the Senate of the Republic from 1976 to 1987 for three legislatures (VII, VIII, IX).

== Biography ==
Renzo Bonazzi was born in Reggio Emilia, Italy in 1925 and died in Reggio Emilia in 2010 at the age of 85. He is married to Marisa Bonazzi.

== See also ==
- List of mayors of Reggio Emilia

Political offices
| Preceded by Cesare Campioli | Mayor of Reggio Emilia; 17 May 1962—12 May 1976 | Succeeded by Ugo Benassi |
