= List of mayors of Reggio Emilia =

Mayor of Reggio Emilia
- Sindaco di Reggio Emilia
- Incumbent; Marco Massari (PD) since 21 June 2024
- Appointer: Popular election
- Term length: 5 years, renewable once
- Formation: 1859
- Website: Official website

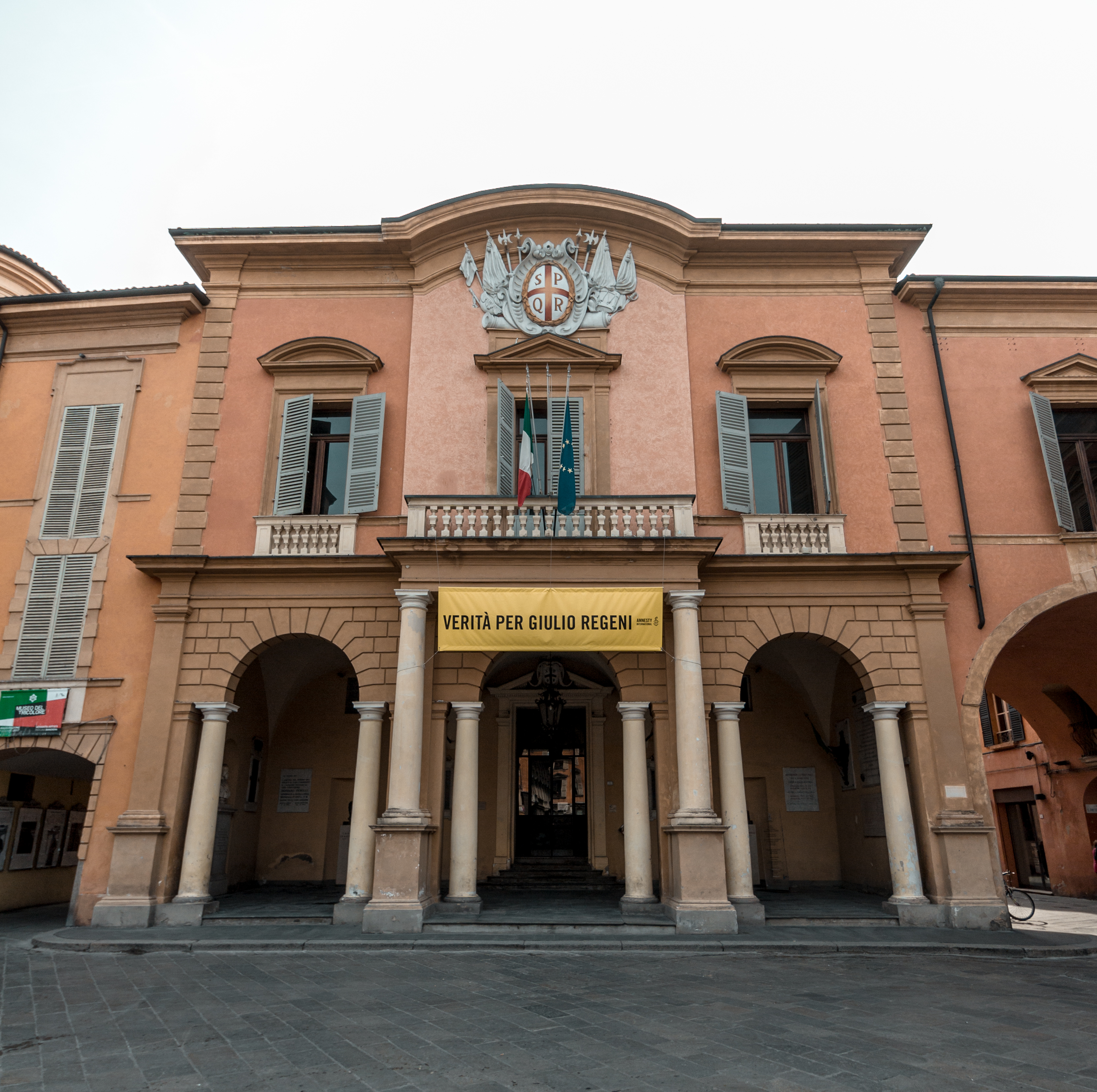
Reggio Emilia's City Hall

The Mayor of Reggio Emilia is an elected politician who, along with the Reggio Emilia's City Council, is accountable for the strategic government of Reggio Emilia in Emilia-Romagna, Italy.

The elected Mayor is Marco Massari, a member of the Democratic Party, elected on 9 June 2024.

== Overview ==
According to the Italian Constitution, the Mayor of Reggio Emilia is member of the City Council.

The Mayor is elected by the population of Reggio Emilia, who also elect the members of the City Council, controlling the Mayor's policy guidelines and is able to enforce his resignation by a motion of no confidence. The Mayor is entitled to appoint and release the members of his government.

Since 1995 the Mayor is elected directly by Reggio Emilia's electorate: in all mayoral elections in Italy in cities with a population higher than 15,000 the voters express a direct choice for the mayor or an indirect choice voting for the party of the candidate's coalition. If no candidate receives at least 50% of votes, the top two candidates go to a second round after two weeks. The election of the City Council is based on a direct choice for the candidate with a preference vote: the candidate with the majority of the preferences is elected. The number of seats for each party is determined proportionally.

== Republic of Italy (since 1946) ==
=== City Council election (1946–1995) ===
From 1946 to 1995, the Mayor of Reggio Emilia was elected by the City Council.

	Mayor	Term start	Term end	Party
1	Cesare Campioli (1902–1971)	1 May 1946	17 May 1962	PCI
2	Renzo Bonazzi (1925–2010)	17 May 1962	12 May 1976	PCI
3	Ugo Benassi (1928–2011)	12 May 1976	19 February 1987	PCI
4	Giulio Fantuzzi (b. 1950)	19 February 1987	14 June 1991	PCI
5	Antonella Spaggiari (b. 1957)	14 June 1991	24 April 1995	PDS

=== Direct election (since 1995) ===
Since 1995, under provisions of new local administration law, the Mayor of Reggio Emilia is chosen by direct election, originally every four and since 1999 every five years.

	Mayor	Term start	Term end	Party	Coalition	Election
(5)	Antonella Spaggiari (b. 1957)	24 April 1995	14 June 1999	PDS; DS	The Olive Tree (PDS-PPI-FdV-PdD)	1995
(5)	Antonella Spaggiari (b. 1957)	14 June 1999	14 June 2004	PDS; DS	The Olive Tree (DS-PPI-Dem-SDI)	1999
6	Graziano Delrio (b. 1960)	14 June 2004	9 June 2009	DL; PD	The Olive Tree (DS-DL-PRC-PdCI)	2004
6	Graziano Delrio (b. 1960)	9 June 2009	3 June 2013 (Note: Resigned after being appointed Minister of Regional Affairs and Autonomies in the Letta Cabinet. The deputy mayor Ugo Ferrari (PD) held the office till a new municipal election was held.)	DL; PD	PD • SEL • IdV	2009
7	Luca Vecchi (b. 1972)	5 June 2014	19 June 2019	PD	PD • SEL	2014
7	Luca Vecchi (b. 1972)	19 June 2019	21 June 2024	PD	PD • EV • +E	2019
8	Marco Massari (b. 1960)	21 June 2024	Incumbent	PD	PD • M5S • EV	2024

== See also ==
- Timeline of Reggio Emilia
