= Ugo Benassi =

Italian politician (1928–2011)

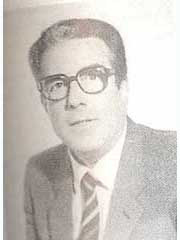

Mayor of Reggio Emilia
- In office 12 May 1976 – 19 February 1987
- Preceded by: Renzo Bonazzi
- Succeeded by: Giulio Fantuzzi

Member of the Senate
- In office 9 July 1987 – 17 April 1991

Personal details
- Born: 24 September 1928 Carpineti, Italy
- Died: 17 September 2011 (aged 82) Reggio Emilia, Italy
- Party: Italian Communist Party
- Occupation: politician

Ugo Benassi (24 September 1928 – 17 September 2011) was an Italian politician.

He was a member of the Italian Communist Party. He served as Mayor of Reggio Emilia from 1976 to 1987.

He was elected to the Senate of the Republic in 1987.

== Biography ==
Ugo Benassi was born in Carpineti, Italy in 1928 and died in Reggio Emilia in 2011 at the age of 82.

== See also ==
- List of mayors of Reggio Emilia

Political offices
Preceded by Renzo Bonazzi	Mayor of Reggio Emilia; 12 May 1976—19 February 1987	Succeeded by Giulio Fantuzzi
