= Antonio Molinaroli =

Italian politician (1894–1972)

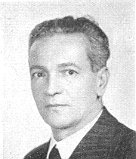

Member of the Chamber of Deputies
- In office 1948–1953
- Constituency: Piacenza

President of the Province of Piacenza
- In office February 1961 – March 1965
- Preceded by: Franco Giacoboni
- Succeeded by: Franco Giacoboni

Personal details
- Born: 24 May 1894 Piacenza, Kingdom of Italy
- Died: 7 October 1972 (aged 78) Piacenza, Italy
- Party: Christian Democracy
- Profession: Public official

Antonio Molinaroli (24 May 1894 – 7 October 1972) was an Italian politician who served as a member of the Chamber of Deputies (1948–1953) and president of the Province of Piacenza (1961–1965).
