= Giulio Fantuzzi =

Italian politician (born 1950)

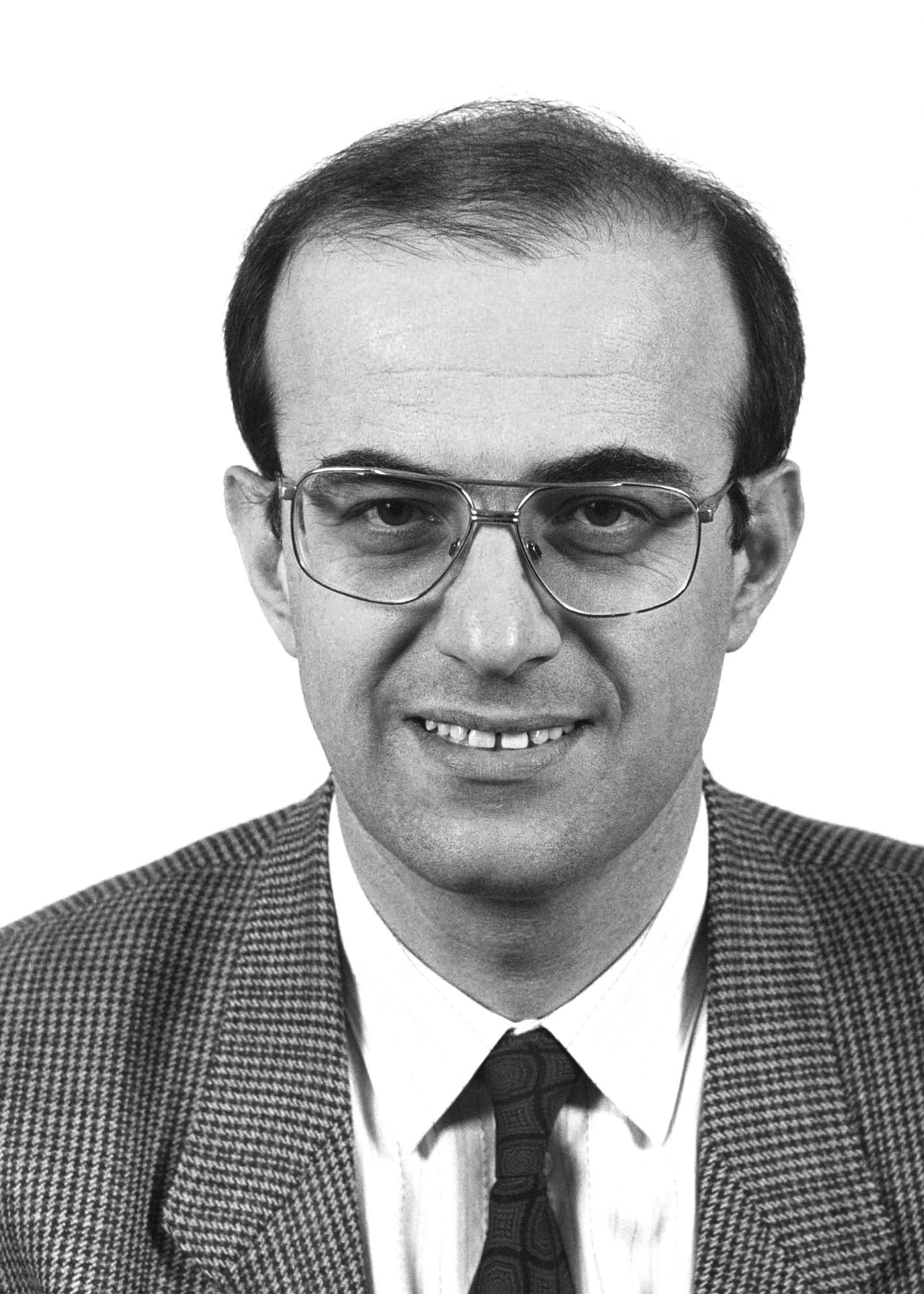
- Fantuzzi in 1994

Mayor of Reggio Emilia
- In office 19 February 1987 – 14 June 1991
- Preceded by: Ugo Benassi
- Succeeded by: Antonella Spaggiari

Member of the European Parliament
- In office 1989–1999

Mayor of Correggio
- In office 1975–1980

Personal details
- Born: September 17, 1950 (age 74); Reggio Emilia, Italy
- Political party: Democratic Party
- Occupation: politician

Giulio Fantuzzi (born 17 September 1950) is an Italian politician.

He is a member of the Democratic Party. He has served as mayor of Reggio Emilia from 1987 to 1991. He was elected mayor of Correggio from 1975 to 1980.

He was a member of the Agriculture Commission. He was elected coordinator of the Democratic Party for the province of Reggio Emilia in 2007.

He was elected provincial secretary by the Reggio Democratic Party in 2008.

He was a Member of the European Parliament from 1989 to 1999.

== Biography ==
Giulio Fantuzzi was born in Reggio Emilia, Italy in 1950.

== See also ==
- List of mayors of Reggio Emilia

Political offices
Preceded by Ugo Benassi	Mayor of Reggio Emilia; 19 February 1987—14 June 1991	Succeeded by Antonella Spaggiari
Preceded by -	Member of the European Parliament; 1989 – 1999	Succeeded by -
Preceded by -	Mayor of Correggio; 1975 – 1980	Succeeded by -
