= Francesco Rolleri =

Italian politician and businessman

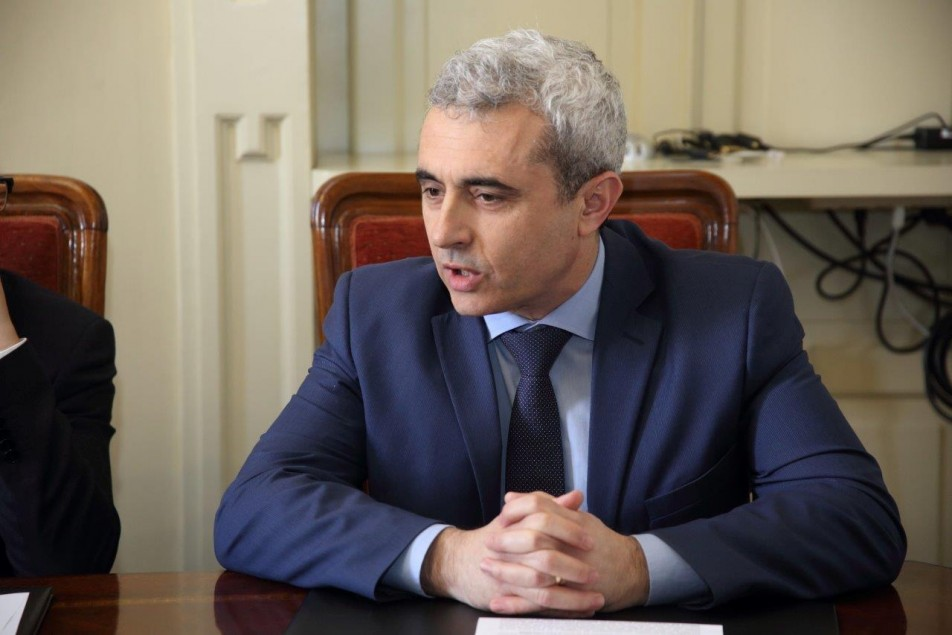

President of the Province of Piacenza
- In office 14 October 2014 – 31 October 2018
- Preceded by: Massimo Trespidi
- Succeeded by: Patrizia Barbieri

Mayor of Vigolzone
- In office 8 June 2009 – 26 May 2019
- Preceded by: Mario Chiesa
- Succeeded by: Gianluca Argellati

Personal details
- Born: 7 January 1965 (age 61) Piacenza, Italy
- Education: University of Urbino
- Occupation: Businessman

Francesco Rolleri (born 7 January 1965) is an Italian politician and businessman who served as president of the Province of Piacenza from 2014 to 2018.

== Life and career ==
Rolleri was born in Piacenza in 1965. After taking a diploma from a local Technical Commercial Institute, he founded a sheet metal bending company in 1987 together with his father and brother, which later became Rolleri S.p.A. The business later developed into Rolleri Holding, a group comprising several brands operating in industrial and related sectors. Rolleri soon pursued his interest in politics, graduating in political science from the University of Urbino.

In 2009, he was elected mayor of Vigolzone and was re-elected for a second term in 2014.

On 14 October 2014, following the introduction of indirect provincial elections in Italy, Rolleri was elected president of the Province of Piacenza receiving 55,215 weighted votes. Supported by a centre-left coalition, he served a four-year term, succeeding Massimo Trespidi and leaving office in 2018, when he was succeeded by Patrizia Barbieri.

Rolleri was elected president of Confindustria Piacenza in 2020, serving until May 2024, when he was succeeded by Nicola Parenti. During his presidency, the association increased the number of employees represented by its member companies from about 17,000 to more than 24,000, despite the economic challenges posed by the COVID-19 pandemic and the energy crisis.
