= Monica Patelli =

Italian politician

President of the Province of Piacenza
- Incumbent
- Assumed office 25 September 2022
- Preceded by: Patrizia Barbieri

Mayor of Borgonovo Val Tidone
- Incumbent
- Assumed office 5 October 2021
- Preceded by: Pietro Mazzocchi

Personal details
- Born: August 26, 1979 (age 47) Castel San Giovanni, Emilia-Romagna, Italy
- Education: Polytechnic University of Milan

Monica Patelli (born 26 August 1979) is an Italian politician who has served as president of the Province of Piacenza since 2022.

== Life and career ==
Patelli graduated in mechanical engineering from the Polytechnic University of Milan and later worked in local administration in the province of Piacenza. Since 2010, she has working as coordinator of the Institute for Transport and Logistics (ITL) in Piacenza.

In the 2021 local elections, she was elected mayor of Borgonovo Val Tidone, defeating incumbent mayor Pietro Mazzocchi with 46% of preferences and becoming the municipality's first female mayor.

On 25 September 2022, Patelli was elected president of the Province of Piacenza as the candidate of the centre-left coalition, defeating her opponent Paola Galvani, mayor of Rottofreno. Although Galvani received more individual votes from electors, Patelli won on the basis of the weighted voting system used in provincial elections, obtaining 48,163 weighted votes (52.8%) against Galvani's 43,104 (47.2%).
