= Alfredo Conti =

Italian lawyer and politician (1894–1978)

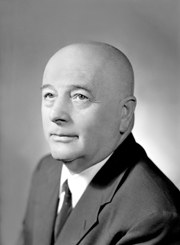

Member of the Senate of the Republic
- In office 1958–1968
- Constituency: Emilia-Romagna

President of the Province of Piacenza
- In office July 1956 – March 1958
- Preceded by: Ettore Martini
- Succeeded by: Franco Giacoboni

Personal details
- Born: 5 January 1894 Cremona, Kingdom of Italy
- Died: 2 July 1978 (aged 84)
- Party: Christian Democracy
- Profession: Lawyer

Alfredo Conti (5 January 1894 – 2 July 1978) was an Italian politician who served as president of the Province of Piacenza (1956–1958) and as a member of the Senate of the Republic (1958–1968).
