= Patrizia Barbieri =

Italian politician (born 1960)

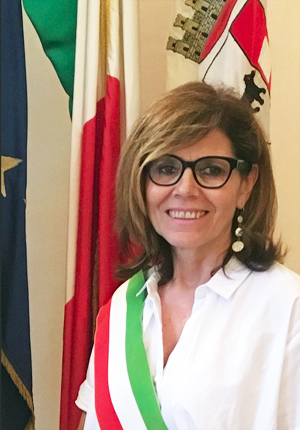

Mayor of Piacenza
- In office 27 June 2017 – 29 June 2022
- Preceded by: Paolo Dosi
- Succeeded by: Katia Tarasconi

President of the Province of Piacenza
- In office 31 October 2018 – 29 June 2022
- Preceded by: Francesco Rolleri
- Succeeded by: Monica Patelli

Personal details
- Born: 8 May 1960 (age 66) Cremona, Lombardy, Italy
- Party: Independent (Centre-Right)
- Education: University of Parma
- Occupation: lawyer
- Website: patriziabarbieri.com

Patrizia Barbieri (born 8 May 1960) is an Italian politician.

== Life and career ==
Barbieri was born in Cremona, Italy, and she graduated in law at University of Parma. She has a law firm together with some partners in Piacenza, where she works as a civil lawyer and as a freelancer. She resides in Castelvetro Piacentino, a little town where she was Mayor from 20 November 1994 to 26 May 2003 (two consecutive terms). She is married and has two daughters.

Supported by Lega Nord, Forza Italia, Brothers of Italy and a civic list, she won the 2017 Piacenza mayoral election and then officially took office on 28 June 2017 as Mayor of Piacenza for a first five-year term (renewable once). Through second degree elections – i.e. through indirect elections reserved for local administrators (Mayors and Councilors of Municipalities of the territory) – on 31 October 2018 was elected – maintaining simultaneously her role as mayor, as required by the Delrio Law – also President of the Province of Piacenza for a first four-year term (renewable once).

On 4 March 2020 Barbieri announced she had tested positive for SARS-CoV-2.

On 16 February 2022, she decided to run (supported again by the same parties) for a second, and last, five-year term as Mayor of Piacenza in the 2022 election: Barbieri lost re-election on 26 June with 46.54% of votes against Katia Tarasconi (PD) in the run-off and she officially left office on 29 June: as established by the Delrio Law, with the loss of the role of mayor Barbieri lost also the presidency of the Province which is held ad interim by the vicepresident Franco Albertini pending the regular election at the expiry of the mandate in September, when she was succeeded by Monica Patelli.

Political offices
Preceded by Paolo Dosi	Mayor of Piacenza; 2017–2022	Succeeded by Katia Tarasconi
Preceded by Francesco Rolleri	President of the Province of Piacenza; 2018–2022	Succeeded by Monica Patelli
