= Luca Vecchi =

Italian politician

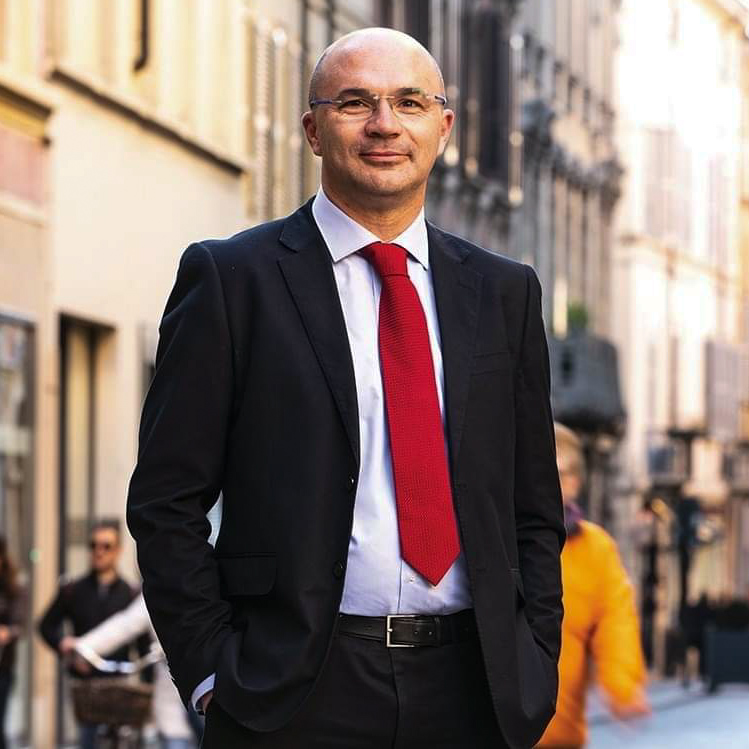

Mayor of Reggio Emilia
- In office 5 June 2014 – 21 June 2024
- Preceded by: Graziano Delrio
- Succeeded by: Marco Massari

Personal details
- Born: 21 September 1972 (age 54) Reggio Emilia, Emilia-Romagna, Italy
- Party: Democratic Party
- Education: University of Modena and Reggio Emilia
- Profession: Tax advisor

Luca Vecchi (born 21 September 1972) is an Italian politician. A member of the Democratic Party, he was elected Mayor of Reggio Emilia on 25 May 2014 and took office on 5 June. He was re-elected for a second term in 2019.

== See also ==
- 2014 Italian local elections
- 2019 Italian local elections
- List of mayors of Reggio Emilia

Political offices
Preceded by Graziano Delrio	Mayor of Reggio Emilia; 2014-2024	Succeeded by Marco Massari
