= Antonella Spaggiari =

Italian politician

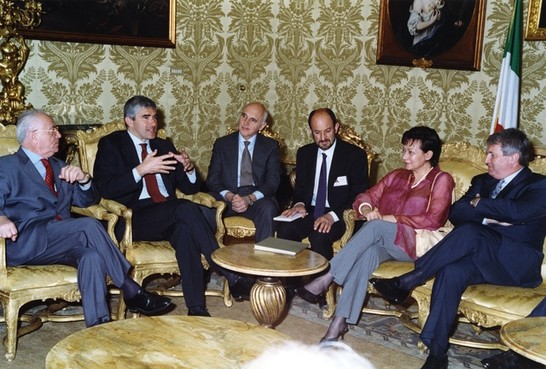

Mayor of Reggio Emilia
- In office 14 June 1991 – 14 June 2004
- Preceded by: Giulio Fantuzzi
- Succeeded by: Graziano Delrio

Personal details
- Born: 27 April 1957 (age 68) Reggio Emilia, Italy
- Party: Italian Communist Party

Antonella Spaggiari (born 27 April 1957) is an Italian politician.

She was a member of the Italian Communist Party, serving also as party secretary and group leader at the city council of Reggio Emilia. She was elected mayor of Reggio Emilia to replace Giulio Fantuzzi and served from 1991 to 2004.

She was appointed director of the Manodori Foundation in 2004.

== Biography ==
Antonella Spaggiari was born in Reggio Emilia, Italy in 1957.

== See also ==
- List of mayors of Reggio Emilia

Political offices
Preceded by Giulio Fantuzzi	Mayor of Reggio Emilia; 14 June 1991—14 June 2004	Succeeded by Graziano Delrio
