= Campoli =

Campoli may refer to:

- Alfredo Campoli (1906–1991), famous violinist who was often referred to simply as "Campoli"
- Chris Campoli (born 1984), Canadian professional ice hockey player
- Cosmo Campoli (1922–1997), Chicago-based sculptor
- María Antonieta Cámpoli (born 1955), Italian-Venezuelan pageant titleholder, Miss Venezuela in 1972

It may also refer to any one of several places in Italy:

- Campoli Appennino, a municipality in the Province of Frosinone, Lazio
- Campoli del Monte Taburno, a municipality in the Province of Benevento, Campania
- Campoli, a civil parish of Caulonia (RC), Calabria

== See also ==
- Campioli
