= Domenico Ciampoli =

Italian writer (1852–1929)

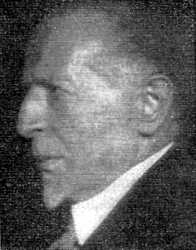
Domenico Ciampoli

Domenico Ciampoli (23 August 1852 in Atessa – 21 March 1929 in Rome) was an Italian writer and Slavist, best remembered for his writings on verism, particularly his short stories Fiori de monte (1876), Fiabe abruzzesi (1880), Racconti abruzzesi (1880), Trecce nere (1882) and Cicuta (1884), his novels L'ignoto (1884), Roccamarina (1890), L'invinsibile (1896), and Il Barone di San Giorgio (1897), and his Slavic publications Melodie Russe (1881), and Studi Slavi and Letterature slave (1889–1890).

== Biography ==
He did his early studies in Atessa, then in Vasto and Lanciano, finishing high school in L'Aquila. After graduating in Literature from the University of Naples Federico II, he taught in several high schools from 1881 until, when he moved to Rome and obtained a professorship in Italian Language and Slavic Literature, he taught at the University of Sassari from 1884 and from 1887 to 1891 at the University of Catania.

Meanwhile, he had written several collections of popular novellas with a verist imprint: Bianca del Sangro (1878), Fiori di monte (1878), Fiabe abruzzesi (1880), Racconti abruzzesi (1880), Trecce nere (1882), Cicuta (1884), Fra le selve (1891), which were followed, from 1884 to 1897, by five novels influenced by Gabriele D'Annunzio: Diana, Roccamarina, Il Pinturicchio, L'invisibile and Il Barone di S. Giorgio. In addition to editing several translations of Slavic epic and folk songs and short stories and novels of nineteenth-century Russian classics (by authors such as Tolstoy, Gogol', Pushkin, Mikhail Lermontov, and Turgenev), he published Literary Studies and Slavic Literatures in 1891, an erudite survey of Aleardo Aleardi poetic work, Plagi aleardiani, in 1896, and Critical Essays on Foreign Literatures in 1904.

In 1892 he left teaching to move to the Vittorio Emanuele II National Library in Rome and then to the Marciana in Venice. From 1899 he directed several Italian libraries: the University Library of Sassari, again the National Library of Rome, then from 1907 the Biblioteca Casanatense, the Giovanni Maria Lancisi, the Biblioteca Angelica and finally, from 1918 again the Lancisian Library: this activity enabled him to study, translate and publish several codices. Retired in 1923, he died in Rome in 1929.
