= Paolo Dosi =

Italian politician

Mayor of Piacenza
- In office 23 May 2012 – 27 June 2017
- Preceded by: Roberto Reggi
- Succeeded by: Patrizia Barbieri

Personal details
- Born: Paolo Dosi; 28 March 1954 (age 72) Piacenza, Italy
- Party: Democratic Party (PD)
- Occupation: Politician

Paolo Dosi (born 28 March 1954) is an Italian politician who served as Mayor of Piacenza from 2012 to 2017.

== Biography ==
Member of the Democratic Party, Paolo Dosi was Mayor of Piacenza from 2012 to 2017. He became the candidate of the center-left coalition (led by PD) because he won the 2011 primary election: Dosi was elected mayor in May 2012. After only a single five-year term, in December 2016 Dosi (eligible for a second and final term) decided to not run. He left office in June 2017.

=== Personal life ===
He was born in Piacenza, Italy. Dosi is married with Stefania. The couple has two child.

Political offices
Preceded by Roberto Reggi	Mayor of Piacenza; 2012–2017	Succeeded by Patrizia Barbieri
Party political offices
Preceded by Roberto Reggi (2007)	Democratic Party nominee for Mayor of Piacenza; 2012	Succeeded by Paolo Rizzi (2017)
