= Graziano Delrio =

Italian medical doctor and politician (born 1960)

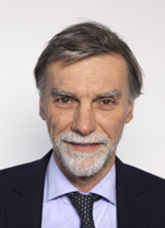

Minister of Infrastructure and Transport
- In office 2 April 2015 – 1 June 2018
- Prime Minister: Matteo Renzi; Paolo Gentiloni
- Preceded by: Maurizio Lupi
- Succeeded by: Danilo Toninelli

Secretary of the Council of Ministers
- In office 22 February 2014 – 2 April 2015
- Prime Minister: Matteo Renzi
- Preceded by: Filippo Patroni Griffi
- Succeeded by: Claudio De Vincenti

Minister for Regional Affairs and Autonomies
- In office 28 April 2013 – 22 February 2014
- Prime Minister: Enrico Letta
- Preceded by: Piero Gnudi
- Succeeded by: Maria Carmela Lanzetta

Member of the Senate
- Incumbent
- Assumed office 13 October 2022
- Constituency: Emilia-Romagna

Member of the Chamber of Deputies
- In office 23 March 2018 – 13 October 2022
- Constituency: Reggio Emilia

Mayor of Reggio Emilia
- In office 13 June 2004 – 3 June 2013
- Preceded by: Antonella Spaggiari
- Succeeded by: Luca Vecchi

Personal details
- Born: 27 April 1960 (age 66) Reggio Emilia, Italy
- Party: PPI (1994–2002); DL (2002–2007); PD (since 2007)
- Spouse: Anna Maria Grassi (since 1982)
- Children: 9
- Education: University of Modena

Graziano Delrio (born 27 April 1960) is an Italian medical doctor and politician, who served in the government of Italy as Minister of Infrastructure and Transport from 2 April 2015 to 1 June 2018. He previously served as the state secretary to Prime Minister Matteo Renzi. He was minister for regional affairs and autonomy from 28 April 2013 to 22 February 2014 as part of the Letta Cabinet. He also served as the mayor of Reggio Emilia.

== Personal life ==
Graziano Delrio was born in Reggio nell'Emilia on 27 April 1960, he is married and has nine children. He holds a degree in medicine and studied in the UK and Israel. His specialization is in endocrinology.

He is close to the Communion and Liberation movement, and he spoke in the Rimini Meeting in August 2018.

== Career ==
Delrio worked at the University of Modena and Reggio Emilia as a faculty member and researcher. He is the founder and former director of the Giorgio la Pira Association, which was founded to promote cultural contact between Italy and the Middle East. He is a senior member of the Democratic Party. In 1999, he became a member of the municipal council of the Reggio Emilia province. In 2000, he was elected to the regional board and served as the president of the health and social politics commission for the province and as the member of the environment and territory commission.

In 2004, he became a member of the Margherita Party and was elected as the mayor of Reggio Emilia for the Unione Party. He was the president of national association of Italian municipalities until July 2013 when the mayor of Turin, Piero Fassino, was elected to the post. On 28 April 2013, Delrio was appointed minister for regional affairs and autonomy to the cabinet led by the Prime Minister Enrico Letta. On 22 February 2014, he was appointed state secretary to the Prime Minister Matteo Renzi's office.

In 2014, the Italian Parliament approved a law proposed by Delrio, which abolished the Provinces of Italy, ascribing their political and administrative powers to the upper and lower constituent entities of the national jurisdiction (in Italian called comune and regione). As of March 2021, the related reform was implemented by Friuli-Venezia Giulia and Sicily.

== Legal issues ==
Delrio was investigated due to 'ndrangheta illegal goods and services control in the 2010s.
