= List of mayors of Piacenza =

Mayor of Piacenza
- Sindaco di Piacenza

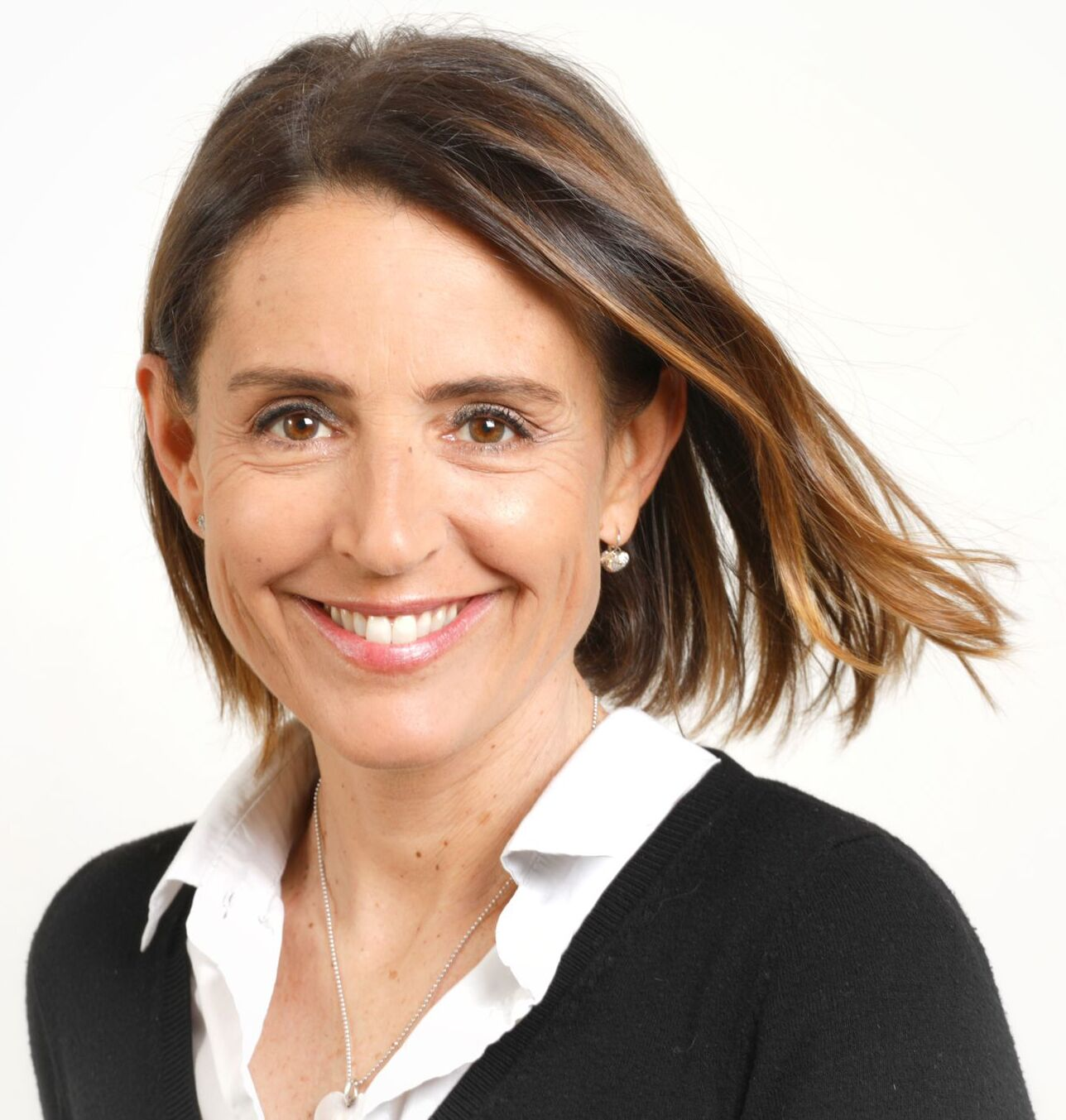
- Incumbent; Katia Tarasconi (PD) since 29 June 2022
- Appointer: Popular election
- Term length: 5 years, renewable once
- Formation: 1860
- Website: Official website

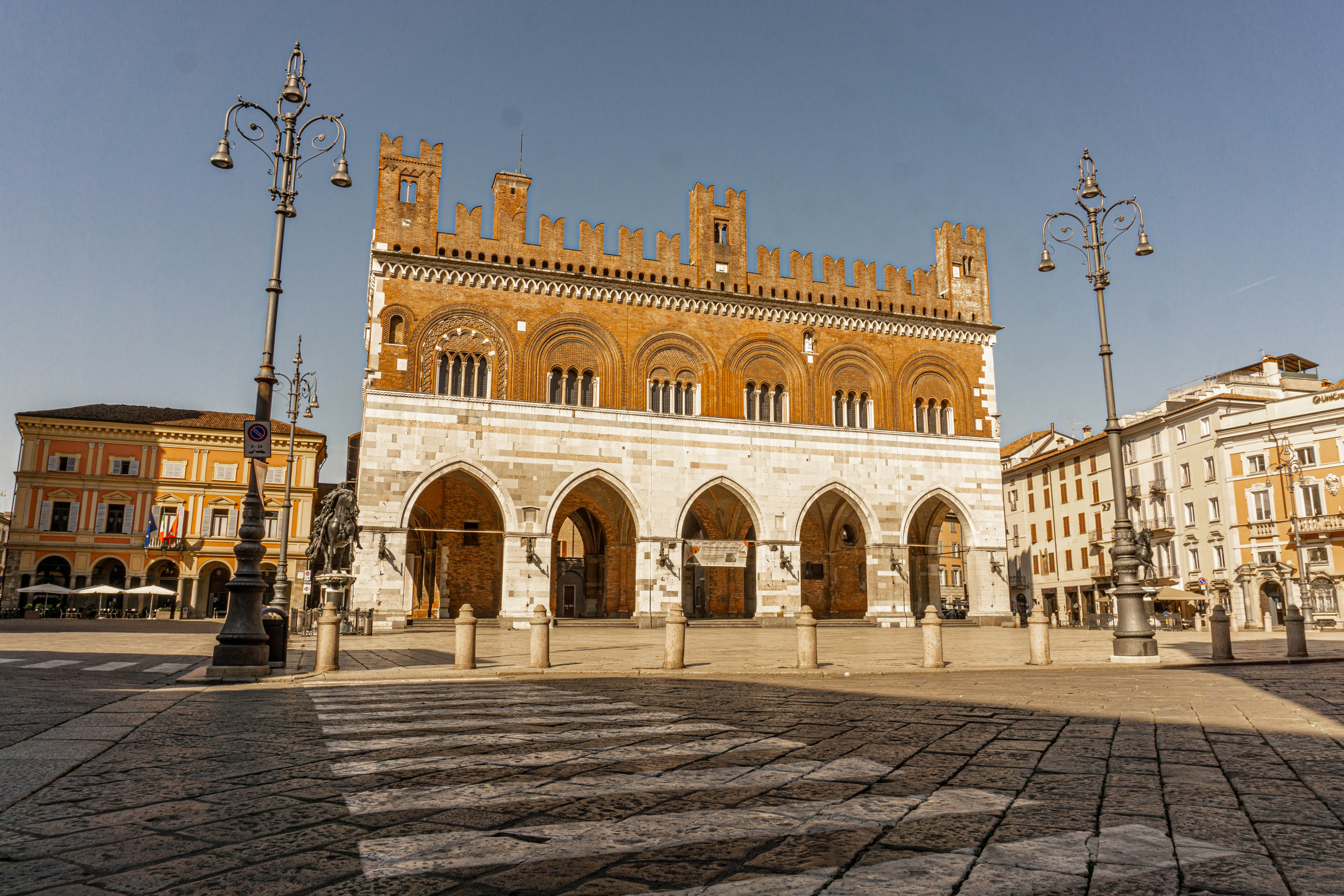
Piacenza City Hall

The mayor of Piacenza is an elected politician who, along with the Piacenza's city council, is accountable for the strategic government of Piacenza in Emilia-Romagna, Italy.

The current mayor is Katia Tarasconi (PD), who took office on 29 June 2022.

== Overview ==
According to the Italian Constitution, the mayor of Piacenza is member of the city council.

The mayor is elected by the population of Piacenza, who also elect the members of the city council, controlling the mayor's policy guidelines and is able to enforce his resignation by a motion of no confidence. The mayor is entitled to appoint and release the members of his government.

Since 1994 the mayor is elected directly by Piacenza's electorate: in all mayoral elections in Italy in cities with a population higher than 15,000 the voters express a direct choice for the mayor or an indirect choice voting for the party of the candidate's coalition. If no candidate receives at least 50% of votes, the top two candidates go to a second round after two weeks. The election of the City Council is based on a direct choice for the candidate with a preference vote: the candidate with the majority of the preferences is elected. The number of the seats for each party is determined proportionally.

== Italian Republic (since 1946) ==
=== City Council election (1946–1994) ===
From 1946 to 1994, the Mayor of Piacenza was elected by the City Council.

	Mayor	Term start	Term end	Party
1	Giuseppe Visconti	1946	1947	PCI
2	Ettore Crovini	1947	1950	PCI
Special Prefectural Commissioner tenure (1950–1951)
3	Giacomo Chiapponi	1951	1956	DC
4	Angelo Faggi	1956	1957	PSDI
5	Giancarlo Montani	1957	1960	PSDI
6	Alberto Spigaroli	1960	1963	DC
7	Giovanni Menzani	1963	1965	DC
8	Giovanni Cerlesi	1965	1966	PSDI
(5)	Giancarlo Montani	1966	1970	PSDI
9	Erio Ghillani	1970	1975	DC
10	Felice Trabacchi	1975	1980	PCI
11	Stefano Pareti	1980	1985	PSI
12	Angelo Tansini	1985	1990	PSDI
13	Franco Benaglia	1990	1992	PSI
14	Anna Braghieri	1992	1993	DC
15	Filippo Grandi	1993	1994	PLI

=== Direct election (since 1994) ===
Since 1994, under provisions of new local administration law, the Mayor of Piacenza is chosen by direct election, originally every four, and since 2002 every five years.

	Mayor	Term start	Term end	Party	Coalition	Election
16	Giacomo Vaciago (1942–2017)	28 June 1994	9 June 1998	Ind	PDS • AD • FdV	1994
17	Gianguido Guidotti (1937–2024)	9 June 1998	12 June 2002	Ind	Pole for Freedoms (FI-AN-CCD)	1998
18	Roberto Reggi (b. 1960)	12 June 2002	11 June 2007	DL; PD	The Olive Tree (DS-DL-PRC)	2002
18	Roberto Reggi (b. 1960)	11 June 2007	23 May 2012	DL; PD	The Olive Tree (DS-DL-PRC)	2007
19	Paolo Dosi (b. 1954)	23 May 2012	27 June 2017	PD	PD • Mod • IdV • SEL	2012
20	Patrizia Barbieri (b. 1960)	27 June 2017	29 June 2022	Ind	FI • Lega • FdI	2017
21	Katia Tarasconi (b. 1973)	29 June 2022	Incumbent	PD	PD and leftist lists	2022

== See also ==
- Timeline of Piacenza

== Bibliography ==
- "Il sindaco di Piacenza nella storia". Il Nuovo Gironale. No. 24. 21 June 2002.
