= Cesare Campioli =

Italian politician and lawyer

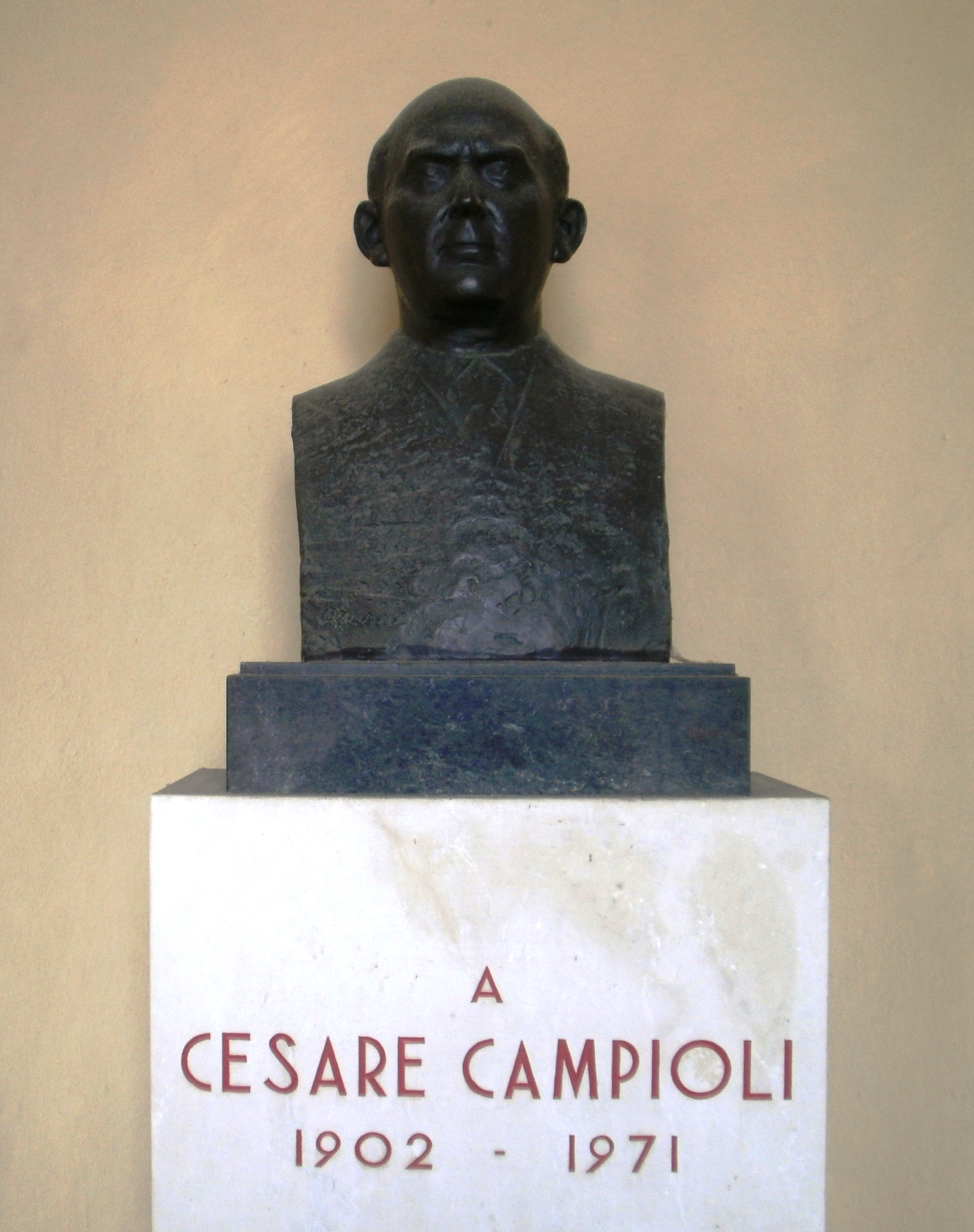

Mayor of Reggio Emilia
- In office 4 May 1945 – 17 May 1962
- Preceded by: Prospero Miselli
- Succeeded by: Renzo Bonazzi

Personal details
- Born: 24 March 1902 Cavazzoli, Italy
- Died: 25 January 1971 (aged 68) Reggio Emilia, Italy
- Party: Italian Communist Party
- Occupation: businessman.

Cesare Campioli (24 March 1902 – 25 January 1971) was an Italian politician and businessman.

He was member of the Italian Communist Party and was appointed Mayor of Reggio Emilia by the Prefect with a decree of 4 May 1945. He served as mayor for 17 years from 1945 to 1962.

== Biography ==
Cesare Campioli was born in Cavazzoli, Italy in 1902 and died in Reggio Emilia in 1971 at the age of 68. He left the office of mayor in 1962.

== See also ==
- List of mayors of Reggio Emilia

Political offices
Preceded by Prospero Miselli	Mayor of Reggio Emilia; 4 May 1945—17 May 1962	Succeeded by Renzo Bonazzi
