= Gian Luigi Boiardi =

Italian politician (1951–2018)

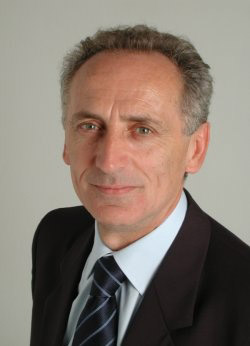
Gian Luigi Boiardi

Gian Luigi Boiardi (9 January 1951 – 18 September 2018) was an Italian politician who served as a Deputy from 2001 to 2005.
