= 2024 Italian local elections =

The 2024 Italian local elections were held in various Italian local communities on 8-9 June 2024, at the same time as the European elections and the Piedmontese election, with a run-off round on 23–24 June.

== Results ==
=== Results in Provincial Capitals ===
Region	City	Population	Incumbent mayor	Elected mayor	1st round		2nd round		Seats
Region	City	Population	Incumbent mayor	Elected mayor	Votes	%	Votes	%	Seats
Abruzzo	Pescara	119,554	Carlo Masci (FI)	Carlo Masci (FI)	31,535	51.0%	—	—	20 / 32
Apulia	Bari	316,491	Antonio Decaro (PD)	Vito Leccese (PD)	73,735	48.0%	72,038	70.3%	22 / 32
Apulia	Lecce	94,783	Carlo Salvemini (PD)	Adriana Poli Bortone (FdI)	26,053	50.0%	23,780	50.7%	20 / 32
Basilicata	Potenza	64,406	Mario Guarente (Lega)	Vincenzo Telesca (Ind.)	12,319	32.4%	19,733	64.9%	20 / 32
Calabria	Vibo Valentia	33,642	Maria Limardo (Ind.)	Enzo Romeo (Ind.)	5,863	31.9%	6,788	53.6%	20 / 32
Campania	Avellino	54,515	Gianluca Festa (Ind.)	Laura Nargi (Ind.)	9,975	32.5%	12,501	51.8%	20 / 32
Emilia-Romagna	Cesena	97,137	Enzo Lattuca (PD)	Enzo Lattuca (PD)	31,492	65.2%	—	—	22 / 32
Emilia-Romagna	Ferrara	132,009	Alan Fabbri (LN)	Alan Fabbri (LN)	40,921	57.9%	—	—	20 / 32
Emilia-Romagna	Forlì	116,700	Gian Luca Zattini (LN)	Gian Luca Zattini (LN)	27,819	50.6%	—	—	20 / 32
Emilia-Romagna	Modena	184,732	Gian Carlo Muzzarelli (PD)	Massimo Mezzetti (PD)	54,860	63.8%	—	—	22 / 32
Emilia-Romagna	Reggio Emilia	171,944	Luca Vecchi (PD)	Marco Massari (PD)	42,598	56.0%	—	—	20 / 32
Lombardy	Bergamo	121,200	Giorgio Gori (PD)	Elena Carnevali (PD)	31,321	55.0%	—	—	20 / 32
Lombardy	Cremona	71,223	Gianluca Galimberti (PD)	Andrea Virgilio (PD)	13,484	41.9%	13,013	50.4%	20 / 32
Lombardy	Pavia	73,086	Fabrizio Fracassi (Lega)	Michele Lissia (PD)	18,042	53.1%	—	—	20 / 32
Marche	Ascoli Piceno	45,483	Marco Fioravanti (FdI)	Marco Fioravanti (FdI)	20,088	73.9%	—	—	25 / 32
Marche	Pesaro	94,813	Matteo Ricci (PD)	Andrea Biancani (PD)	30,020	60.6%	—	—	21 / 32
Marche	Urbino	14,786	Maurizio Gambini (Ind.)	Maurizio Gambini (Ind.)	4,052	48.0%	4,354	53.1%	20 / 32
Molise	Campobasso	47,449	Roberto Gravina (M5S)	Marialuisa Forte (PD)	8,643	32.2%	10,510	51.0%	10 / 32
Piedmont	Biella	44,324	Claudio Corradino (LN)	Marzio Olivero (FdI)	10,999	53.8%	—	—	20 / 32
Piedmont	Verbania	30,104	Silvia Marchionini (PD)	Giandomenico Albertella (Ind.)	4,439	30.0%	6,452	51.9%	20 / 32
Piedmont	Vercelli	45,875	Andrea Corsaro (FI)	Roberto Scheda (Ind.)	7,784	37.9%	8,070	54.2%	20 / 32
Sardinia	Cagliari	154,460	Paolo Truzzu (FdI)	Massimo Zedda (PP)	43,268	60.3%	—	—	21 / 34
Sardinia	Sassari	127,567	Nanni Campus (Ind.)	Giuseppe Mascia (PD)	31,108	51.1%	—	—	21 / 34
Sicily	Caltanisetta	62,797	Roberto Gambino (M5S)	Walter Tesauro (UdC)	10,052	34.4%	10,610	52.4%	14 / 24
Tuscany	Florence	367,150	Dario Nardella (PD)	Sara Funaro (PD)	78,126	43.2%	82,254	60.6%	22 / 36
Tuscany	Livorno	152,914	Luca Salvetti (Ind.)	Luca Salvetti (Ind.)	37,478	51.7%	—	—	20 / 32
Tuscany	Prato	195,213	Matteo Biffoni (PD)	Ilaria Bugetti (PD)	42,947	52.2%	—	—	20 / 32
Umbria	Perugia	161,228	Andrea Romizi (FI)	Vittoria Ferdinandi (Ind.)	40,922	49.0%	40,696	52.1%	20 / 32
Veneto	Rovigo	50,279	Gianfranco Tomao (Ind.)	Valeria Cittadin (Ind.)	12,117	49.1%	11,486	58.2%	20 / 32
