= Timeline of Forlì =

History of the city of Forli, Italy

The following is a timeline of the history of the city of Forlì in the Emilia-Romagna region of Italy.

== Prior to 20th century ==
- 188 BCE – Via Aemilia (road) built through Forum Livii.
- 2nd–4th century CE – Roman Catholic diocese of Forlì established.
- 4th century CE – Mercurialis of Forlì becomes bishop.
- 1058 – Ravenna-Forli conflict; Forli becomes a "free commune."
- 1173 – Fire.
- 1180 – Abbey of San Mercuriale belltower built.
- 1212 – Civic piazza established.
- 1275 – Forces of Guelph Bologna and Ghibelline Forlì fight in the Battle of San Procolo.
- 1282 – Battle of Forlì; French and Guelph forces under Jean d'Eppe defeated.
- 1315 – Ordelaffi in power.
- 1371 – Rocca di Ravaldino (citadel) built.
- 1418 – Regional Jewish congress held in Forlì.
- 1427 – Chiesa di San Biagio (Forlì) (church) built.
- 1460 – Palazzo del Podestà (Forlì) built.
- 1495 – Printing press in operation.
- 1499–1500 – Siege of Forli by forces of Cesare Borgia during the Italian War of 1499–1504.
- 1504 – Forlì becomes part of the Papal States.
- 1574 – Accademia dei Filergiti (learned society) founded.
- 1750 – Biblioteca comunale Aurelio Saffi (library) founded.
- 1816 – Parco della Resistenza in Forlì (park) laid out.
- 1838 – Pinacoteca Civica di Forlì (museum) founded.
- 1859 – Province of Forlì established.
- 1861
  - Bologna–Forlì railway begins operating.
  - Population: 37,648.
- 1879 – Meteorological observatory established.
- 1881 – Tranvia Forlì-Meldola (tram) begins operating.
- 1883 – Tranvia Forlì-Ravenna (tram) begins operating.

== 20th century ==
- 1901 – Population: 43,321
- 1902 – Camera del Lavoro (labor entity) formed.
- 1911 – Population: 45,994.
- 1919 – Foot-Ball Club Forlì formed.
- 1925 – Stadio Tullo Morgagni (stadium) opens.
- 1926 – Forlì railway station opens.
- 1931 – Population: 60,824.
- 1934 – Forlì Airport built.
- 1943 – Campo di concentramento di Forlì begins operating during World War II.
- 1944 – September: Attack on Forlì airport by German forces.
- 1963 – Archivio di Stato di Forlì (state archives) established.
- 1992 – Province renamed "Province of Forlì-Cesena."
- 2000 – Teatro Diego Fabbri (theatre) opens.

== 21st century ==
- 2009 – Local election held; Roberto Balzani becomes mayor.
- 2013 – Population: 116,029.
- 2014 – Davide Drei becomes mayor.
- 2019 – Gian Luca Zattini becomes mayor.

== See also ==
- History of Forlì
- List of mayors of Forlì
- List of bishops of Forli
- History of Romagna region

Timelines of other cities in the macroregion of Northeast Italy:^{(it)}

- Emilia-Romagna region: Timeline of Bologna; Ferrara; Modena; Parma; Piacenza; Ravenna; Reggio Emilia; Rimini
- Friuli-Venezia Giulia region: Timeline of Trieste
- Trentino-South Tyrol region: Timeline of Trento
- Veneto region: Timeline of Padua; Treviso; Venice; Verona; Vicenza

== Bibliography ==
=== in English ===
- William Smith, ed. (1872) [1854]. "Forum Livii". Dictionary of Greek and Roman Geography. London: John Murray. hdl:2027/hvd.ah5cuq.
- Ismar Elbogen (1903), "Forli", Jewish Encyclopedia, vol. 5, New York, hdl:2027/mdp.49015002282276
- "Forli", Central Italy and Rome: Handbook for Travellers (15th ed.), Leipzig: Karl Baedeker, 1909, OCLC 423237
- Ashby, Thomas (1910). "Forlì" . Encyclopædia Britannica. Vol. 10 (11th ed.). p. 666.
- Roy Domenico (2002). "Emilia Romagna: Forli/Cesena". Regions of Italy: a Reference Guide to History and Culture. Greenwood. pp. 88+. ISBN 0313307334.
- Darrell D. Davisson (2004). "Forlì". In Christopher Kleinhenz (ed.). Medieval Italy: an Encyclopedia. Routledge. pp. 361+. ISBN 0415939291.

=== in Italian ===
- Leone Cobelli [in Italian] (1874). Cronache forlivesi. (Written in 15th century)
- Andrea Bernardi [in Italian] (1897). Giuseppe Mazzatinti [in Italian] (ed.). Cronache Forlivesi dal 1476 al 1517. Dei monumenti istorici pertinenti alle Provincie della Romagna.Ser.3: Cronache. R. Deputazione di Storia Patria. (Written in 16th century)
- Paolo Bonoli [in Italian] (1661). Historia della città di Forlì.
- Q. Marchesi. Supplemento istorico dell'antica città di Forlì, 1678
- Guida per la città di Forlì. Casali. 1838.
- Iscrizioni nella città di Forli e suo territorio dall'anno 1180 al 1800. Casali. 1849.
- "Forlì". Nuova Enciclopedia Italiana (in Italian). Vol. 9 (6th ed.). Turin: Unione Tipografico-Editrice Torinese. 1880. hdl:2027/uc1.c2649807.
- Carlo Lozzi (1886). "Storie de'Municipii: Forlì". Biblioteca istorica della antica e nuova Italia (in Italian). Vol. 1. Imola. OCLC 12117233. (Bibliography)
- Nicola Bernardini, ed. (1890). "Provincia di Forlì". Guida della stampa periodica italiana (in Italian). Lecce: R. Tipografia editrice salentina dei fratelli Spacciante.
- Brando Brandi (1892). L'archivio storico del comune di Forli. Rome.
- E. Calzini and G. Mazzatinti. Guida di Forlì, 1893
- E. Casadei. Forlì e dintorni, Società Tipografica Forlivese, 1928
- "Forli", Enciclopedia Italiana (Treccani) (in Italian), 1932
- Storia di Forlì, Nuova Alfa Editoriale, 1989 (3 volumes)
