= 2014 Italian local elections =

The 2014 Italian local elections were held on 25 May, with a second round on 8 June. In Italy, direct elections were held in 4,086 municipalities: in each municipality (comune) were chosen mayor and members of the City Council. Of the 4,086 municipalities, 29 were provincial capitals and 243 had a population higher than 15,000 inhabitants (10,000 for Sicily).

Municipal councilors and mayors ordinarily serve a terms of five years.

== Voting System ==
All mayoral elections in Italy in cities with a population higher than 15,000 use the same system. Under this system voters express a direct choice for the mayor or an indirect choice voting for one of the parties of the candidate's coalition. If no candidate receives a majority of votes, the top two candidates go to a second round after two weeks. The coalition of the elected mayor is guaranteed a majority of seats in the council with the attribution of extra seats.

The City Council is elected at the same time as the mayor. Voters can vote for a list of candidates and can express up to two preferences for candidates of said list. In case of two preferences, they must be given to candidates of both genders. Seats are the attributed to parties proportionally, and for each party the candidates with the highest number of preferences are elected.

== Results ==
=== Coalition results ===
Majority of each coalition in 243 municipalities (comuni) with a population higher than 15,000:

Coalition	Comuni
Centre-left coalition	164
Centre-right coalition	41
Five Star Movement	3
Independents and others	35

=== Party results ===
Party votes in 29 provincial capital municipalities:

Party	Votes
Democratic Party	737,879
Five Star Movement	202,795
Forza Italia	187,238
Left Ecology Freedom	48,597
Brothers of Italy	45,989
New Centre-Right	33,388
Northern League	31,401

=== Mayoral election results ===
Region	City	Incumbent mayor	Elected mayor	1st round		2nd round		Seats	Source
Region	City	Incumbent mayor	Elected mayor	Votes	%	Votes	%	Seats	Source
Piedmont	Biella	Donato Gentile (FI)	Marco Cavicchioli (PD)	8,743	36.62%	10,462	59.17%	20 / 32	
Piedmont	Verbania	Michele Mazza	Silvia Marchionini (PD)	7,788	46.90%	8,815	77.89%	20 / 32	
Piedmont	Vercelli	Andrea Corsaro (FI)	Maura Forte (PD)	8,518	35.41%	11,200	67.50%	20 / 32	
Lombardy	Bergamo	Franco Tentorio (FI)	Giorgio Gori (PD)	28,281	45.48%	26,385	53.50%	20 / 32	
Lombardy	Cremona	Oreste Perri (FI)	Gianluca Galimberti (PD)	17,512	45.80%	17,300	56.31%	20 / 32	
Lombardy	Pavia	Alessandro Cattaneo (FI)	Massimo Depaoli (PD)	14,326	36.44%	17,068	53.13%	20 / 32	
Veneto	Padua	Ivo Rossi (PD)	Massimo Bitonci (LN)	34,890	31.42%	51,702	53.50%	20 / 32	
Emilia-Romagna	Cesena	Paolo Lucchi (PD)	Paolo Lucchi (PD)	29,715	54.79%	—	—	15 / 24	
Emilia-Romagna	Ferrara	Tiziano Tagliani (PD)	Tiziano Tagliani (PD)	41,205	55.55%	—	—	20 / 32	
Emilia-Romagna	Forlì	Roberto Balzani (PD)	Davide Drei (PD)	33,755	54.27%	—	—	20 / 32	
Emilia-Romagna	Modena	Giorgio Pighi (PD)	Gian Carlo Muzzarelli (PD)	47,492	49.71%	38,068	63.07%	20 / 32	
Emilia-Romagna	Reggio Emilia	Ugo Ferrari	Luca Vecchi (PD)	46,673	56.38%	—	—	20 / 32	
Tuscany	Florence	Dario Nardella (PD)	Dario Nardella (PD)	111,049	59.15%	—	—	24 / 36	
Tuscany	Livorno	Alessandro Cosimi (PD)	Filippo Nogarin (M5S)	16,216	19.01%	35,899	53.06%	20 / 32	
Tuscany	Prato	Roberto Cenni (FI)	Matteo Biffoni (PD)	53,167	58.18%	—	—	20 / 32	
Marche	Ascoli Piceno	Guido Castelli (FI)	Guido Castelli (FI)	18,451	58.92%	—	—	22 / 32	
Marche	Pesaro	Luca Ceriscioli (PD)	Matteo Ricci (PD)	32,068	60.51%	—	—	21 / 32	
Marche	Urbino	Franco Corbucci (PD)	Maurizio Gambini (Ind.)	3,105	33.54%	4,610	56,10%	10 / 16	
Umbria	Perugia	Wladimiro Boccali (PD)	Andrea Romizi (FI)	22,375	26.31%	35,469	58.02%	20 / 34	
Umbria	Terni	Leopoldo Di Girolamo (PD)	Leopoldo Di Girolamo (PD)	27,160	46.88%	20,198	59.51%	20 / 32	
Abruzzo	Pescara	Luigi Albore Mascia (FI)	Marco Alessandrini (PD)	29,797	43.00%	29,699	66,34%	20 / 32	
Abruzzo	Teramo	Maurizio Brucchi (FI)	Maurizio Brucchi (FI)	16,770	49.77%	13,616	51.52%	20 / 32	
Molise	Campobasso	Luigi Di Bartolomeo (FI)	Antonio Battista (PD)	15,374	50.01%	—	—	20 / 32	
Apulia	Bari	Michele Emiliano (PD)	Antonio Decaro (PD)	88,371	49.38%	64,457	65.40%	22 / 36	
Apulia	Foggia	Gianni Mongelli (PD)	Franco Landella (FI)	27,075	32.41%	27,839	50.33%	20 / 32	
Basilicata	Potenza	Vito Santarsiero (PD)	Dario De Luca (FdI)	7,132	16.79%	16,293	58.54%	4 / 32	
Calabria	Reggio Calabria	Special commissioners	Giuseppe Falcomatà (PD)	58,171	60.99%	—	—	22 / 32	
Sicily	Caltanissetta	Michele Campisi (NCD)	Giovanni Ruvolo (Ind.)	12,152	46.39%	14,471	64.31%	18 / 30	
Sardinia	Sassari	Gianfranco Ganau (PD)	Nicola Sanna (PD)	43,833	65.28%	—	—	24 / 34	

=== City councils ===
City	PD	FI	LN	SEL	M5S	FdI	NCD	Others
Pescara	14	4	0	2	2	0	2	5
Teramo	5	3	0	0	1	0	4	16
Potenza	13	1	0	0	0	2	0	13
Cesena	15	2	0	0	4	0	1	2
Ferrara	18	3	1	1	4	1	0	1
Forlì	18	4	0	0	3	1	0	2
Modena	19	2	0	1	4	0	0	1
Reggio Emilia	19	2	0	1	5	0	0	1
Bergamo	17	6	2	1	1	1	0	2
Cremona	19	7	1	1	0	0	1	0
Pavia	20	8	1	0	0	0	1	0
Ascoli Piceno	4	6	0	0	1	2	1	14
Pesaro	21	3	0	0	4	0	1	1
Urbino	4	2	0	0	0	0	0	5
Campobasso	9	1	0	0	3	0	0	10
Biella	20	5	1	0	1	1	0	1
Verbania	19	3	1	1	1	0	1	2
Vercelli	14	6	1	0	1	0	0	1
Bari	16	8	0	3	1	1	2	3
Foggia	3	8	0	0	0	1	5	11
Sassari	19	3	0	1	3	0	0	5
Caltanissetta	13	3	0	0	2	0	2	10
Florence	24	4	0	1	3	0	0	1
Livorno	6	0	0	0	20	0	0	2
Prato	20	8	0	0	2	0	0	0
Perugia	8	12	0	0	2	3	3	1
Terni	19	4	0	1	4	1	0	0
Padua	7	4	13	0	1	0	0	3
