= 2019 Italian local elections =

The 2019 Italian local elections will be held on different dates; most on 26 May 2019, together with the 2019 European election, with a second round on 9 June. Direct elections will be held in 3,843 out of 7,918 municipalities; in each of these, mayor and members of the City Council are going to be elected. Of the 3,841 municipalities, 30 are provincial capitals.

The elections in Sicily were held on 28 April, with a second ballot on 12 May. The elections in Sardinia were held on 16 June with a second ballot on 30 June.

== Voting system ==
All mayoral elections in Italy in cities with a population higher than 15,000 use the same voting system. Under this system, voters express a direct choice for the mayor or an indirect choice voting for the party of the candidate's coalition. If no candidate receives at least 50% of votes, the top two candidates go to a second round after two weeks. This gives a result whereby the winning candidate may be able to claim majority support, although it is not guaranteed.

The election of the City Council is based on a direct choice for the candidate with a preference vote: the candidate with the majority of the preferences is elected. The number of seats for each party is determined proportionally.

== Municipal elections ==
=== Overall results ===
Majority of each coalition in the municipalities which have a population higher than 15,000 inhabitants:

Coalition	Comuni
Centre-left coalition	114
Centre-right coalition	87
Independents and civic lists	25
Five Star Movement	3
Right-wing coalition	1

=== Mayoral election results ===
Centre-left coalition
Centre-right coalition
Five Star Movement
Right-wing coalition
Civic lists
Prefectural commissioner

Region	City	Population	Incumbent mayor	Elected mayor	1st round		2nd round		Seats	Source
Region	City	Population	Incumbent mayor	Elected mayor	Votes	%	Votes	%	Seats	Source
Piedmont	Biella	44,324	Marco Cavicchioli (PD)	Claudio Corradino (Lega)	9,317	39.95	8,982	50.98	20 / 32	
Piedmont	Verbania	30,709	Silvia Marchionini (PD)	Silvia Marchionini (PD)	6,244	37.50	6,923	50.62	19 / 32	
Piedmont	Vercelli	46,181	Maura Forte (PD)	Andrea Corsaro (FI)	9,918	41.89	9,450	54.80	20 / 32	
Lombardy	Bergamo	120,923	Giorgio Gori (PD)	Giorgio Gori (PD)	34,499	55.33	—	—	20 / 32	
Lombardy	Cremona	72,156	Gianluca Galimberti (PD)	Gianluca Galimberti (PD)	17,125	46.37	17,245	55.94	20 / 32	
Lombardy	Pavia	72,773	Flavio Ferdani (Note: Prefectural commissioner replacing mayor Massimo Depaoli (PD) since 2 April 2019.)	Fabrizio Fracassi (Lega)	19,787	53.04	—	—	20 / 32	
Veneto	Rovigo	51,008	Nicola Izzo (Note: Prefectural commissioner replacing mayor Massimo Bergamin (LN) since 22 February 2019.)	Edoardo Gaffeo (Ind.)	7,070	25.42	10,600	50.94	20 / 32	
Emilia-Romagna	Ferrara	132,023	Tiziano Tagliani (PD)	Alan Fabbri (Lega)	36,629	48.44	37,504	56.77	20 / 32	
Emilia-Romagna	Forlì	117,863	Davide Drei (PD)	Gian Luca Zattini (Ind.)	27,905	45.80	27,207	53.07	20 / 32	
Emilia-Romagna	Modena	185,273	Gian Carlo Muzzarelli (PD)	Gian Carlo Muzzarelli (PD)	50,750	53.42	—	—	20 / 32	
Emilia-Romagna	Reggio Emilia	171,944	Luca Vecchi (PD)	Luca Vecchi (PD)	40,243	49.13	38,075	63.31	20 / 32	
Tuscany	Florence	380,948	Dario Nardella (PD)	Dario Nardella (PD)	109,728	57.05	—	—	22 / 36	
Tuscany	Livorno	158,371	Filippo Nogarin (M5S)	Luca Salvetti (Ind.)	28,503	34.20	42,186	63.32	20 / 32	
Tuscany	Prato	193,325	Matteo Biffoni (PD)	Matteo Biffoni (PD)	42,316	47.16	42,199	56.12	20 / 32	
Marche	Ascoli Piceno	48,390	Guido Castelli (FI)	Marco Fioravanti (FdI)	10,847	37.38	11,925	59.31	20 / 32	
Marche	Pesaro	94,882	Matteo Ricci (PD)	Matteo Ricci (PD)	30,573	57.32	—	—	20 / 32	
Umbria	Perugia	165,683	Andrea Romizi (FI)	Andrea Romizi (FI)	52,006	59.80	—	—	21 / 32	
Abruzzo	Pescara	119,820	Marco Alessandrini (PD)	Carlo Masci (FI)	32,766	51.33	—	—	20 / 32	
Molise	Campobasso	49,168	Antonio Battista (PD)	Roberto Gravina (M5S)	8,484	29.41	16,139	69.07	20 / 32	
Campania	Avellino	56,339	Giuseppe Priolo (Note: Prefectural commissioner replacing mayor Vincenzo Ciampi (M5S) since 27 November 2018.)	Gianluca Festa (Ind.)	9,266	28.67	11,707	51.52	20 / 32	
Apulia	Bari	322,018	Antonio Decaro (PD)	Antonio Decaro (PD)	114,946	66.27	—	—	24 / 36	
Apulia	Foggia	151,371	Franco Landella (FI)	Franco Landella (FI)	36,400	46.11	29,838	53.28	20 / 32	
Apulia	Lecce	95,425	Ennio Mario Sodano (Note: Prefectural commissioner replacing mayor Carlo Salvemini (PD) since 14 January 2019.)	Carlo Salvemini (Ind.)	26,909	50.87	—	—	20 / 32	
Basilicata	Potenza	67,161	Dario De Luca (FdI)	Mario Guarente (Lega)	18,004	44.73	16,248	50.32	20 / 32	
Calabria	Vibo Valentia	34,133	Giuseppe Guetta (Note: Prefectural commissioner replacing mayor Elio Costa (centre-right independent politician) since 29 January 2019.)	Maria Limardo (Ind.)	11,219	59.54	—	—	21 / 32	
Sicily	Caltanissetta	62,317	Giovanni Ruvolo (Ind.)	Roberto Gambino (M5S)	6,051	19.92	13,796	58.85	14 / 24	
Sardinia	Cagliari	154,052	Bruno Carcangiu (Note: Prefectural commissioner replacing mayor Massimo Zedda (Progressive Camp) since 5 April 2019.)	Paolo Truzzu (FdI)	33,933	50.12	—	—	21 / 34	
Sardinia	Sassari	127,018	Nicola Sanna (PD)	Nanni Campus (Ind.)	17,555	30.54	24,674	56.22	21 / 34	
