= Nadia Romeo =

Italian politician (born 1971)

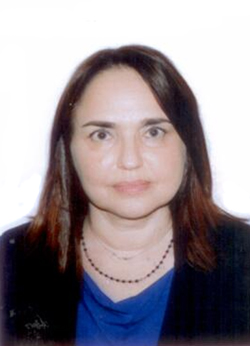
- Romeo in 2024

Member of the Chamber of Deputies
- Incumbent
- Assumed office 9 July 2024
- Preceded by: Alessandro Zan
- Constituency: Veneto 2 – P01

Personal details
- Born: 23 June 1971 (age 54)
- Party: Democratic Party (since 2007)
- Parent: Domenico Romeo (father)

Nadia Romeo (born 23 June 1971) is an Italian politician serving as a member of the Chamber of Deputies since 2024. From 2019 to 2024, she served as president of the municipal council of Rovigo.

== Biography ==
The daughter of Socialist Senator Domenico Romeo, she graduated from a classical high school and earned a degree in political science; she has been a labor consultant since 2002.

A member of the New Italian Socialist Party, she was appointed councilor for the environment and service decentralization in 2003 on the Rovigo city council led by Paolo Avezzù, resigning two years later in 2005 due to disagreements within the center-right majority, and subsequently joining Enrico Boselli Italian Democratic Socialists.

In the 2006 local elections, she ran for the Rovigo City Council on the The Italian Socialists list in support of the center-left mayoral candidate Fausto Merchiori. She was elected city councilor and served as councilor for the environment, commerce and tourism, local police and civil protection, and mobility and transportation in Merchiori’s administration. In the 2011 local elections, she was re-elected as a city councilor, serving as the leader of the Democratic Party (PD) in the Rovigo City Council.

Ahead of the 2015 local elections, she ran for List of mayors of Rovigo after winning the center-left primary election to select the mayoral candidate, backed by the PD and the civic lists Viva Rovigo, Rovigo Cambia Verso, and Italian Socialist Party (2007). With 23.99% of the vote, she was the top vote-getter in the first round and advanced to the runoff against the center-right League candidate Massimo Bergamin (18.64%). In the runoff, she received 40.28% of the vote and was defeated by Bergamin, who received 59.72% with the support of the Obiettivo Rovigo, Popular Area, and Presenza Cristiana lists. She was nevertheless elected to the city council as an unsuccessful mayoral candidate and was also confirmed as the PD’s group leader in the city council.

In the 2019 local elections, she was re-elected as a city councilor in Rovigo and became president of the City Council under the administration of Edoardo Gaffeo, serving in that role until 2024.

In the 2022 early general election, she ran for the Chamber of Deputies as the second candidate on the Democratic Party – Democratic and Progressive Italy list in the Veneto 2 constituency, but finished as the highest-ranking unelected candidate. On July 9, 2024, she became a deputy, taking over for Alessandro Zan, who was elected to the European Parliament. In the 19th legislature, she served on the 13th Agriculture Committee and the Parliamentary Commission of Inquiry on hydrogeological and seismic risk in Italy, on the implementation of prevention and safety regulations and on emergency and reconstruction measures following the natural disasters that occurred since 2019. She also repeatedly denounced the damage caused by the blue crab to oyster production and introduced an amendment to the 2025 Budget Law calling for a reduction in the Value-added tax rate on oysters from 22% to 10%.

In the 2023 PD primaries, he supported the motion put forward by Elly Schlein, a member of Parliament and former vice president of the Emilia-Romagna Region[8], and helped establish the local campaign committee, which won with 53.75% of the vote and subsequently joined the PD’s National Executive Committee.
