= Baiardi =

Baiardi is a surname. Notable people with the surname include:

- Ana María Baiardi Quesnel (born 1965), Paraguayan diplomat and politician
- Ennio Baiardi (1928–2014), Italian politician
- Michael Baiardi (born 1972), American composer, songwriter, and music producer
