= Ferdinandi =

Ferdinandi is a surname. Notable people with the surname include:

- Vincenzo Ferdinandi (1920 –1990), Italian fashion designer
- Vittoria Ferdinandi (born 1986), Italian politician and entrepreneur
