= Music of Emilia-Romagna =

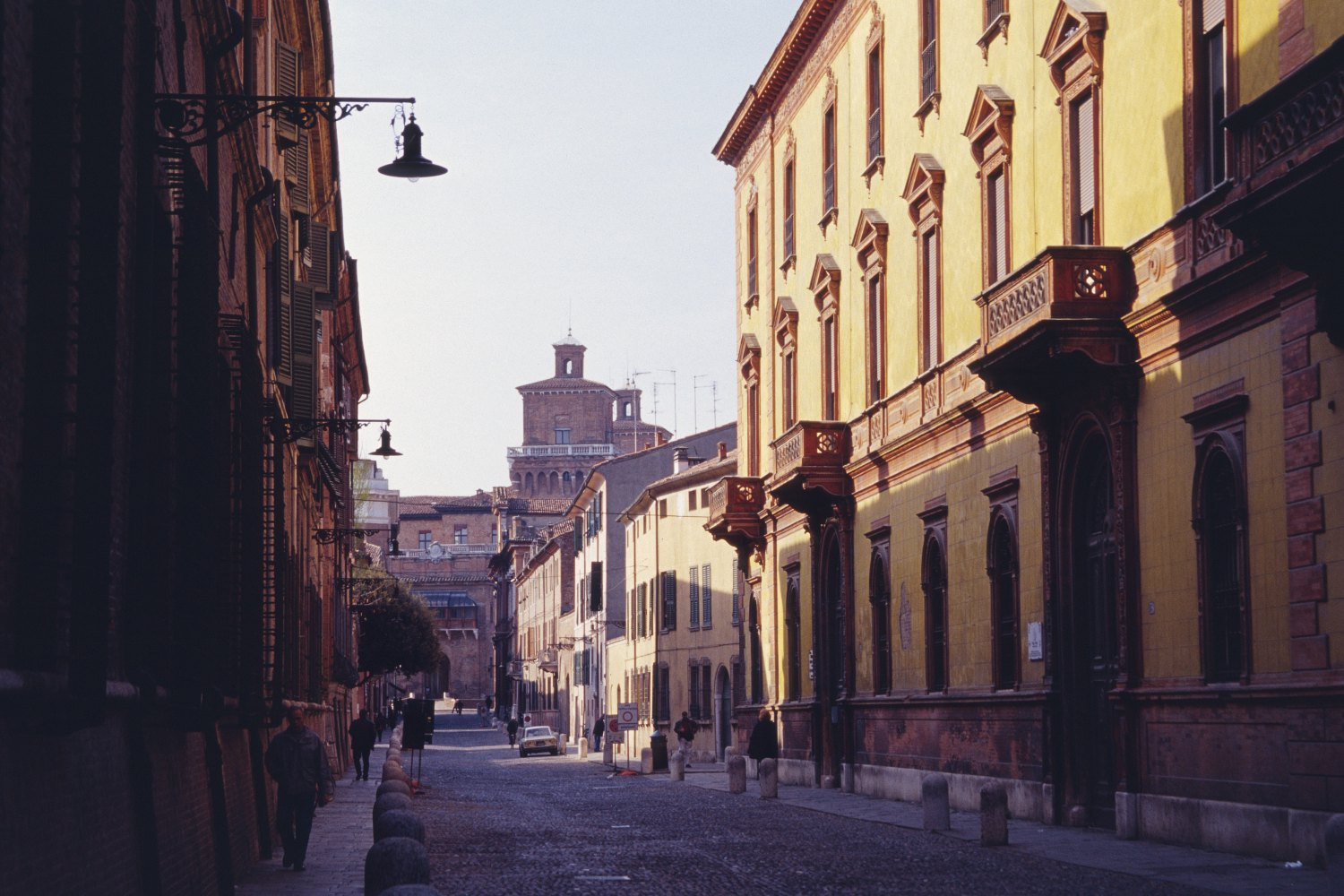
Street in the Renaissance town center of Ferrara.

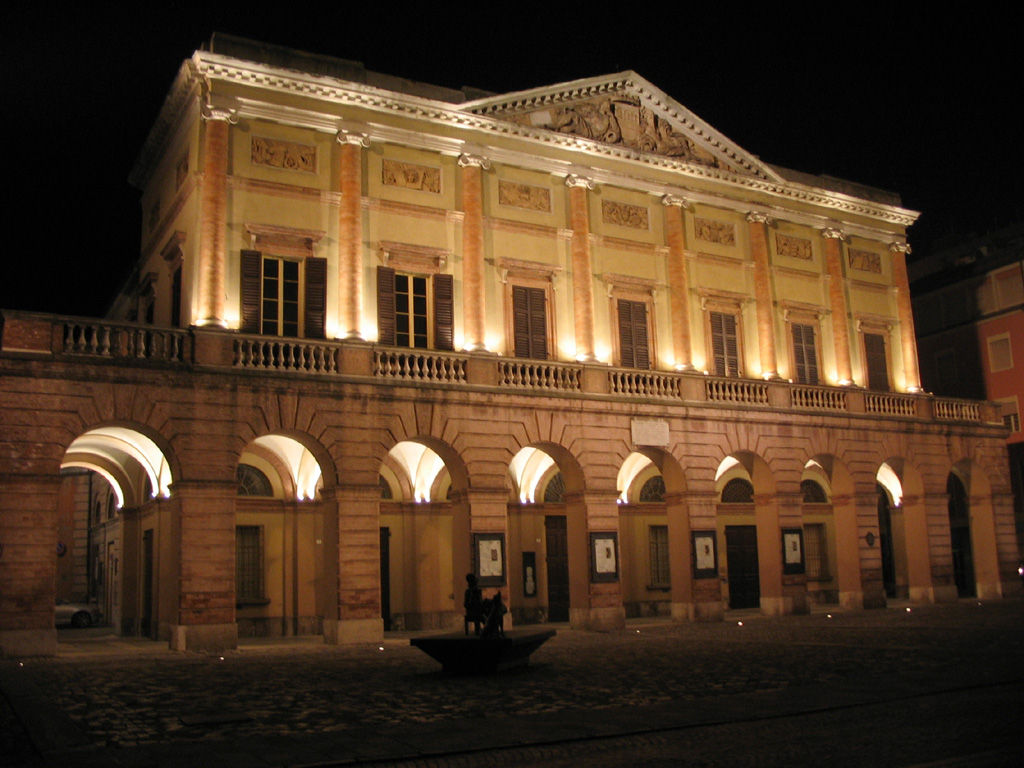
The Teatro Alessandro Bonci in Cesena.

The Music of Emilia-Romagna has the reputation of being one of the richest in Europe; there are six music conservatories alone in the region, and the sheer number of other musical venues and activities is astounding. The region, as the name implies, combines the traditions of two different, contiguous areas—Emilia and Romagna—and it is perhaps this blend that contributes to the wealth of musical culture.

== Musical venues and activities ==
- Bologna's Teatro Comunale is located in Piazza Verdi, in the historic centre of the city, near the International museum and library of music and the Giovanni Battista Martini Music Conservatory. The theatre has a permanent orchestra and the city sponsors an annual MusicaInsieme (Music Together) chamber music festival as well as a series of university concerts. Other venues in the city include the Manzoni Auditorium, the Mario Caglio Europauditorium, the premises of the Philharmonic Academy, the musical instrument collection of the Music Museum, the Chapel of San Petronio, and the University Department of Music and Theatre.
- Cesena is the site of the Teatro Alessandro Bonci and the Bruno Maderna music conservatory. Musical activities in the province include sunrise concerts during the summer and the Suoni del Tempo (Sounds of Time) Festival in the Rocca Malatestiana fortress.
- Ferrara's Teatro Comunale was built in 1798. It is the centre of activity for the annual Ferrara Music Festival. The city has a permanent symphonic orchestra and the Association Ferrara Musica as well as the Gustav Mahler Academy, an organization that runs master classes for young musicians.
- Forlì is the site of the new Teatro Diego Fabbri.
- Modena, the city of Luciano Pavarotti, has a reputation as a centre of Italian pop music, the city of agents, recording studios, publishers, etc. The Teatro Comunale is from 1841. The city has an important musical manuscript collection in the Estense Library and sponsors an annual International Festival of Military Bands.
- Parma's Teatro Regio di Parma is historic, having been built in 1829, when the territory was still the Duchy of Parma. Recent additions to the musical infrastructure of the city include the Casa della Musica to house the musical archives of the city, the Niccolò Paganini Auditorium, and the Toscanini Orchestra, a permanent ensemble. There is an annual Verdi Festival and a joint festival with the neighbouring province of Reggio. Parma is also the site of one of the true marvels of Italian theatre, the Teatro Farnese from 1628, still an active musical venue. Finally, Parma is the birthplace of Arturo Toscanini and the site of the Arrigo Boito Music Conservatory.
- Piacenza's Teatro Municipale was built in 1798. The town is the site of the Giuseppe Nicolini Conservatory and in Villanova sull'Arda stands the Giuseppe Verdi hospital, donated by the composer to his native province just three miles from the town of Busseto, his birthplace.
- Ravenna hosts the Ravenna Festival annually in the region, plus a concert series of the Byzantine Academy, concerts on the premises of the Casa dell'arte, a Jazz Festival, and there is the permanent Ravenna Chamber Ensemble. The main theatre is the Teatro Comunale Alighieri dating from 1852, but venues for the abundant music in Ravenna are spread throughout the city.
- Reggio Emilia's Teatro Municipale has regular opera, concert, and ballet seasons, as well as being the site for two major festivals during the year: Reggio Emilia Dance and the REC Autumn Festival.
- Rimini sponsors a late summer music festival, the Sagra Musicale Malatestiana.
