= Romizi =

Romizi is a surname. Notable people with the surname include:

- Andrea Romizi (born 1979), Italian politician
- Marco Romizi (born 1990), Italian footballer
