= Wladimiro Boccali =

Italian politician

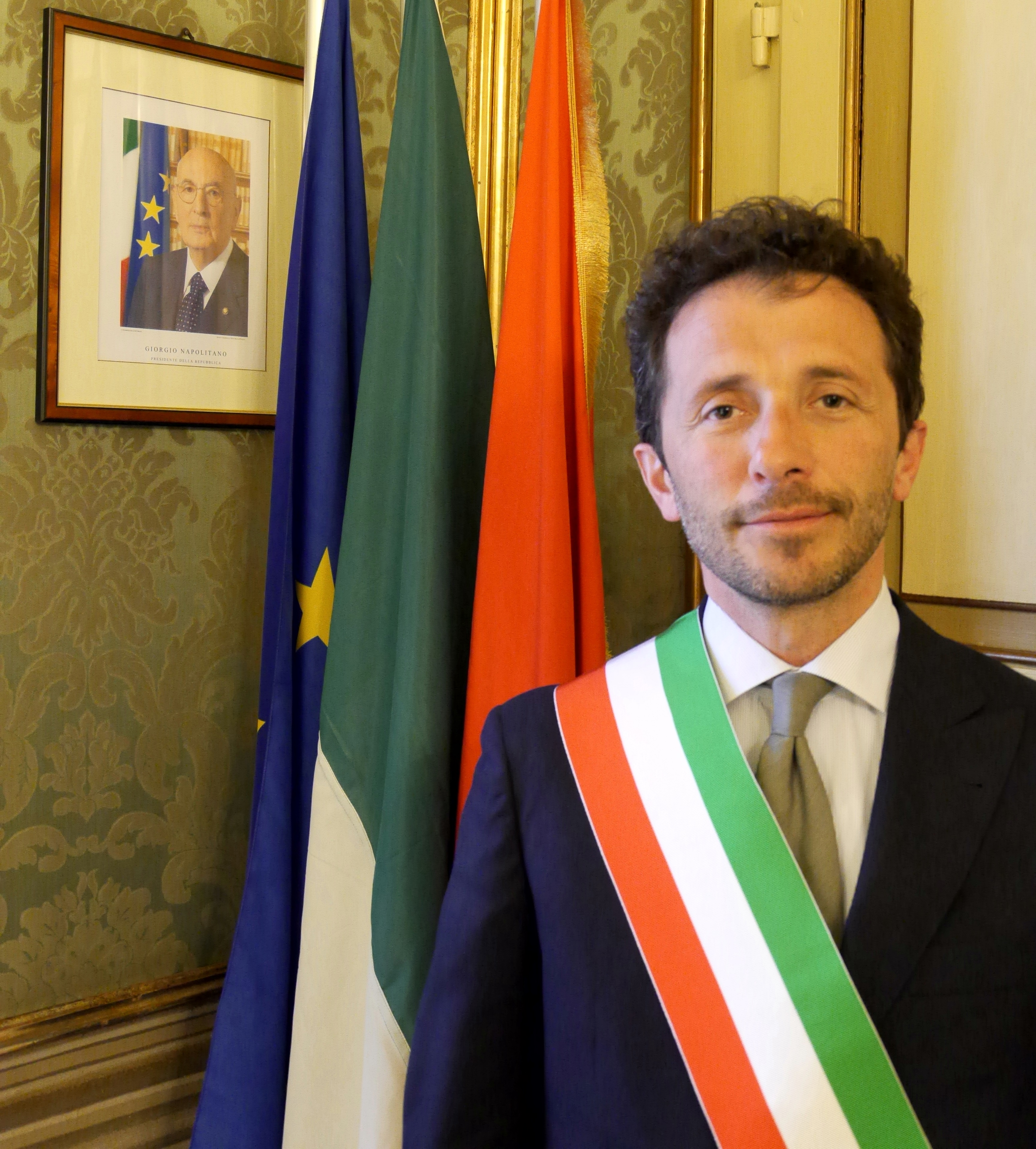

Mayor of Perugia
- In office 8 June 2009 – 11 June 2014
- Preceded by: Renato Locchi
- Succeeded by: Andrea Romizi

Personal details
- Born: 7 June 1970 (age 56) Perugia, Umbria, Italy
- Party: Italian Communist Party (1990-1991); Democratic Party of the Left (1991-1998); Democrats of the Left (1998-2007); Democratic Party (since 2007)

Wladimiro Boccali (born 7 June 1970 in Perugia) is an Italian politician.

He is a member of the Democratic Party and served as Mayor of Perugia from June 2009 to June 2014. Boccali ran for a second term at the 2014 elections but lost to the centre-right candidate Andrea Romizi.

== Biography ==
In 1990, he was elected to the city council as a member of the Italian Communist Party and also became chair of the Municipal Council on Immigration. Following the “Bolognina” political shift, he joined the Democratic Party of the Left. In 1996, he became president of ARCI Perugia and a member of the national executive committee of the Italian Recreational and Cultural Association until 1999. That year, he ran again in the municipal elections and was re-elected as a council member.

Until 2004, he served as councilor for social cohesion policies, and was then appointed councilor for urban planning and private housing, a position he held until 2009.

He won the 2009 municipal elections with 51,114 votes (52.93%) and became mayor of Perugia for the center-left coalition. In 2010, he was appointed president of ANCI Umbria and later also president of the Transportation and Mobility Commission of the National Association of Italian Municipalities. In 2012, he stepped down from that position and was assigned to the ANCI Civil Protection Commission. During his term as mayor, he supported the joint bid by Perugia and Assisi to become the 2019 European Capital of Culture.

In 2014, he ran for re-election in the local elections but was defeated in the runoff on June 8 by center-right candidate Andrea Romizi.

In 2015, he was appointed Chairman of Perseo Sirio (the supplemental pension fund for public administration and healthcare workers).

== See also ==
- List of mayors of Perugia

Political offices
Preceded by Renato Locchi	Mayor of Perugia; 2009–2014	Succeeded by Andrea Romizi
