= Vittorio Barazzotto =

Italian politician

Member of the Provincial Council of Vercelli
- In office 10 July 1990 – 8 May 1995

Mayor of Biella
- In office 28 June 2004 – 8 June 2009
- Preceded by: Gianluca Susta
- Succeeded by: Donato Gentile

Member of the Regional Council of Piedmont
- In office 30 June 2014 – 26 May 2019

Personal details
- Born: 20 November 1958 (age 67) Biella, Province of Vercelli, Italy
- Party: Italian Republican Party (1985-2002); The Daisy (2002-2007); Democratic Party (2007-2019); Italia Viva (since 2019)
- Education: University of Turin
- Profession: Accountant

Vittorio Barazzotto (born 20 November 1958) is an Italian politician.

He is a member of the Democratic Party and he served as Mayor of Biella from 28 June 2004 to 8 June 2009. Barazzotto also served as a member of the Regional Council of Piedmont from 2014 to 2019.

== Life and career ==
City councilor in Biella with the Italian Republican Party from 1987 to 1995 and provincial councilor for the province of Vercelli from 1990 to 1995 and until 1992 delegate for major roads, and from 1992 to 2004 also municipal councilor of Biella, holding various positions: education, culture, finance, CED, personnel, sports, library, and museum during the three terms of Mayor Gianluca Susta. From 1993 to 1994, he was deputy mayor.

In 2001, he was a candidate for the Senate for The Olive Tree (Italy) in the single-member constituency of Biella, obtaining 36.1% of the votes but not being elected.

In the 2004 local elections, he ran for List of mayors of Biella, supported by a center-left coalition consisting of La Margherita, Democrats of the Left, and Italian Communists. In the second round on June 26, he won 50.5% of the vote, beating center-right candidate Gabriele Mello Rella. In 2007, he joined the Democratic Party (Italy), becoming its leader in Biella in 2009.

Running for a second term in the 2009 elections, he was defeated by Donato Gentile of the People of Freedom party, who won 52% of the votes in the first round.From 2009 to 2014, he sat on the city council in the opposition benches.

He was elected Regional council (Italy) with the PD in the 2014 elections for the Biella constituency with 3,167 preference votes, holding the position of chairman of the first budget committee.

He joined Italia Viva in 2019, and since February 2020 he has been the party's regional coordinator for the province of Biella. In 2022, he ran for the Chamber of Deputies for Azione - Italia Viva in the single-member constituency of Novara, obtaining 8.54% of the votes and failing to be elected.

In May 2024, during the European elections, he was nominated as a candidate for the United States of Europe (electoral list) (formed by +Europa, Italia Viva, and other parties) in the northwestern constituency.

== See also ==
- 2004 Italian local elections
- List of mayors of Biella

Political offices
Preceded by Gianluca Susta	Mayor of Biella; 2004–2009	Succeeded by Donato Gentile
