= Bruno Piva =

Italian politician

Mayor of Rovigo
- In office 21 June 2011 – 15 July 2014
- Preceded by: Fausto Merchiori
- Succeeded by: Massimo Bergamin

Personal details
- Born: 16 May 1946 (age 79) Rovigo, Veneto, Italy
- Party: The People of Freedom (2009-2013); Forza Italia (since 2013)
- Profession: physician

Bruno Piva (born 16 May 1946 in Rovigo) is an Italian politician.

He has been chief physician of pain management at Rovigo Hospital. As a member of the centre-right party The People of Freedom, he ran for Mayor of Rovigo at the 2011 Italian local elections. He was elected on 30 May and took office on 21 June 2011. He resigned on 15 July 2014 after an internal government crisis.

== See also ==
- 2011 Italian local elections
- List of mayors of Rovigo

Political offices
| Preceded by Fausto Merchiori | Mayor of Rovigo; 2011–2014 | Succeeded by Massimo Bergamin |
