= Massimo Bergamin =

Italian politician

Mayor of Rovigo
- In office 16 June 2015 – 22 February 2019
- Preceded by: Bruno Piva
- Succeeded by: Edoardo Gaffeo

Personal details
- Born: 21 May 1964 (age 62) Gavello, Veneto, Italy
- Party: Lega Nord

Massimo Bergamin (born 21 May 1964 in Gavello) is an Italian politician.

He is a member of the right-wing populist party Lega Nord. Bergamin was elected Mayor of Rovigo and took office on 16 June 2015.

He resigned on 22 February 2019 after an internal government crisis.

== Biography ==
Elected in 2015 after defeating Democratic Party challenger Nadia Romeo in a runoff election, he was removed from office on February 22, 2019, following the resignation of the majority of council members (22 out of 32).

== See also ==
- 2015 Italian local elections
- List of mayors of Rovigo

Political offices
Preceded by Bruno Piva	Mayor of Rovigo; 2015–2019	Succeeded by Edoardo Gaffeo
