= Gabriele Antonio Fratto =

Italian politician (born 1989)

President of the Province of Forlì-Cesena
- In office 31 October 2018 – 11 October 2021
- Preceded by: Davide Drei
- Succeeded by: Enzo Lattuca

Mayor of Bertinoro
- In office 6 June 2016 – 4 October 2021
- Preceded by: Nevio Zaccarelli
- Succeeded by: Gessica Allegni

Personal details
- Born: 3 April 1989 (age 37) Cesena, Emilia-Romagna, Italy

Gabriele Antonio Fratto (born 3 April 1989) is an Italian politician who served as president of the Province of Forlì-Cesena from 2018 to 2021 and as mayor of Bertinoro from 2016 to 2021.

== Life and career ==
Fratto was elected to the municipal council of Bertinoro in 2011, and became mayor in the 2016 local elections, taking office on 6 June 2016.

In October 2018, Fratto was elected president of the Province of Forlì-Cesena, supported by a centre-left coalition. He received 47,010 weighted votes (67.59%) against Gianluca Vincenzi, the mayor of Gatteo. He remained president until October 2021, when he resigned and was succeeded by his deputy, Cristina Nicoletti, until new elections in December.

Fratto currently serves as vice president of the Fondazione Fornino-Valmori ETS, an organisation based in Emilia-Romagna that provides services and support to people with autism and their families. He is also a member of the Associates' Consultative Council (Consulta dei Soci) of BCC Ravennate Forlivese Imolese, representing the Central Romagna local committee.
