= List of mayors of Perugia =

Mayor of Perugia
- Sindaco di Perugia
- Incumbent; Vittoria Ferdinandi since 25 June 2024
- Appointer: Popular election
- Term length: 5 years, renewable once
- Formation: September 1860
- Website: Official website

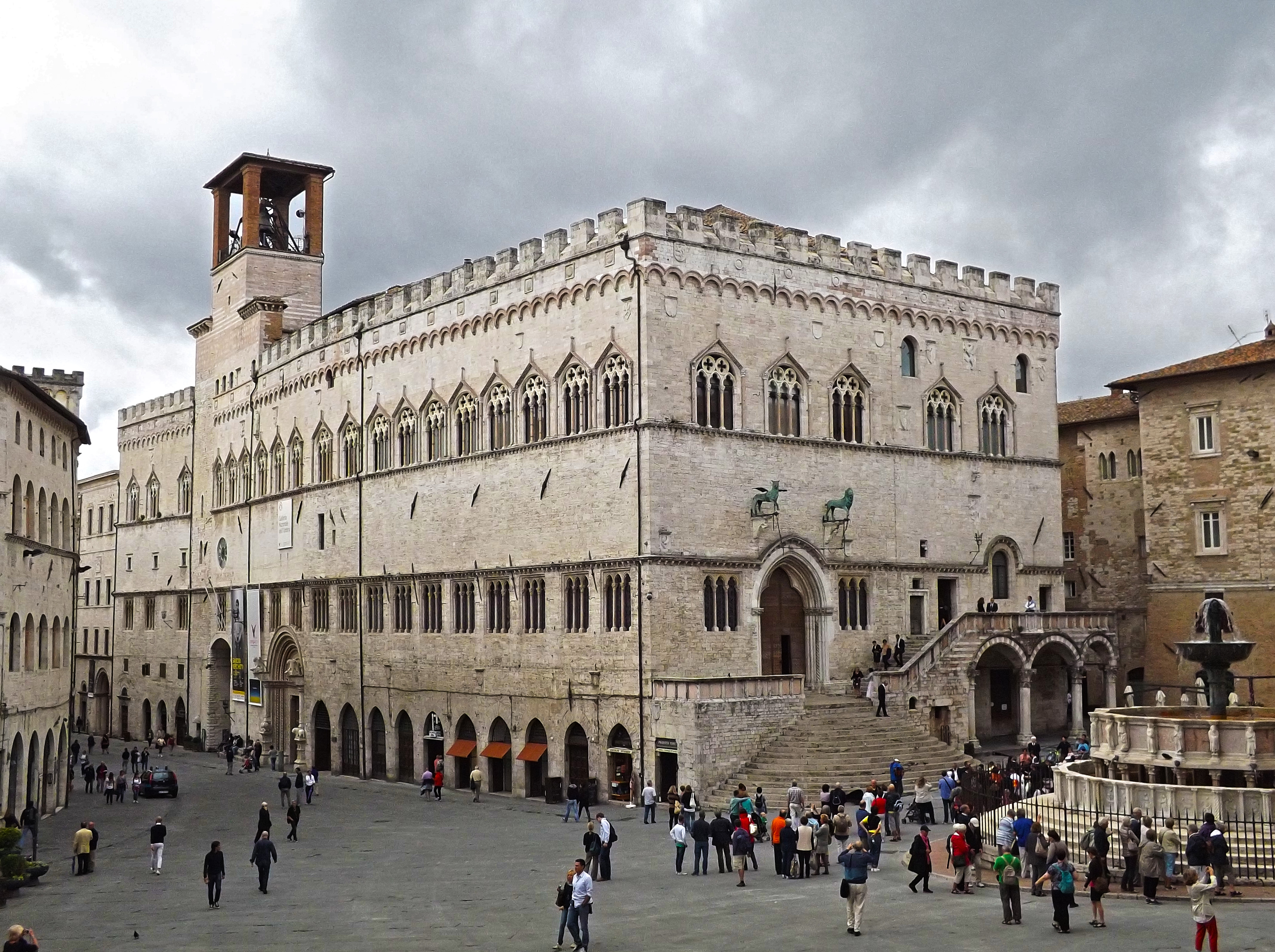
Palazzo dei Priori is the seat of the Mayor of Perugia.

The mayor of Perugia is an elected politician who, along with the Perugia's city council, is accountable for the strategic government of Perugia in Umbria, Italy, the capital city of the region.

The current mayor is Vittoria Ferdinandi, elected on 23–24 June 2024.

== Overview ==
According to the Italian Constitution, the mayor of Perugia is member of the city council.

The mayor is elected by the population of Perugia, who also elect the members of the city council, controlling the mayor's policy guidelines and is able to enforce his resignation by a motion of no confidence. The mayor is entitled to appoint and release the members of his government.

Since 1995 the mayor is elected directly by Perugia's electorate: in all mayoral elections in Italy in cities with a population higher than 15,000 the voters express a direct choice for the mayor or an indirect choice voting for the party of the candidate's coalition. If no candidate receives at least 50% of votes, the top two candidates go to a second round after two weeks. The election of the City Council is based on a direct choice for the candidate with a preference vote: the candidate with the majority of the preferences is elected. The number of the seats for each party is determined proportionally.

== List ==
=== Italian Republic (since 1946) ===
==== City Council election (1946–1995) ====
From 1946 to 1995, the Mayor of Perugia was elected by the City Council.

	Mayor	Term start	Term end	Party	Coalition	Election
1	Ugo Lupattelli	26 January 1946	16 February 1948	PSI	PSI • PCI	1946
2	Aldo Manna	16 February 1948	26 May 1952	PSI	PSI • PCI	1946
2	Aldo Manna	26 May 1952	23 April 1953	PSI	PSI	1952
3	Alessandro Seppilli	29 December 1953	28 May 1956	PSI	PSI	1952
3	Alessandro Seppilli	28 May 1956	7 November 1960	PSI	PSI	1956
3	Alessandro Seppilli	7 November 1960	28 December 1964	PSI	PSI	1960
4	Antonio Berardi	28 December 1964	23 July 1970	PSI	DC • PSI • PSDI	1964
5	Mario Caraffini	23 July 1970	21 July 1975	PSI	PCI • PSI • PSIUP	1970
6	Giovanni Perari	21 July 1975	3 July 1977	PSI	PCI • PSI	1975
7	Stelio Zaganelli	3 July 1977	6 July 1980	PSI	PCI • PSI	1975
8	Giorgio Casoli	6 July 1980	10 July 1985	PSI	PCI • PSI	1980
8	Giorgio Casoli	10 July 1985	25 May 1987	PSI	PCI • PSI	1985
9	Mario Silla Baglioni	25 May 1987	6 July 1990	PSI	PCI • PSI	1985
8	Mario Valentini	6 July 1990	24 April 1995	PSI	PCI • PSI • PRI	1990

==== Direct election (since 1995) ====
Since 1995, under provisions of new local administration law, the Mayor of Perugia is chosen by direct election, originally every four, then every five years.

	Mayor of Perugia	Took office	Left office	Party	Coalition	Election
10	Gianfranco Maddoli (b. 1938)	24 April 1995	14 June 1999	Ind	The Olive Tree (PDS-PRC-PdD-PPI)	1995
11	Renato Locchi (b. 1947)	14 June 1999	14 June 2004	DS; PD	The Olive Tree (DS-PRC-SDI-PPI)	1999
11	Renato Locchi (b. 1947)	14 June 2004	8 June 2009	DS; PD	The Olive Tree (DS-PRC-SDI-DL)	2004
12	Wladimiro Boccali (b. 1970)	8 June 2009	11 June 2014	PD	PD • IdV • SEL • FdS	2009
13	Andrea Romizi (b. 1979)	11 June 2014	31 May 2019	FI	FI • NCD • FdI and right-wing lists	2014
13	Andrea Romizi (b. 1979)	31 May 2019	25 June 2024	FI	FI • Lega • FdI and right-wing lists	2019
14	Vittoria Ferdinandi (b. 1986)	25 June 2024	Incumbent	Ind	PD • AVS • M5S • A	2024
