= List of mayors of Pavia =

Mayor of Pavia
- Sindaco di Pavia

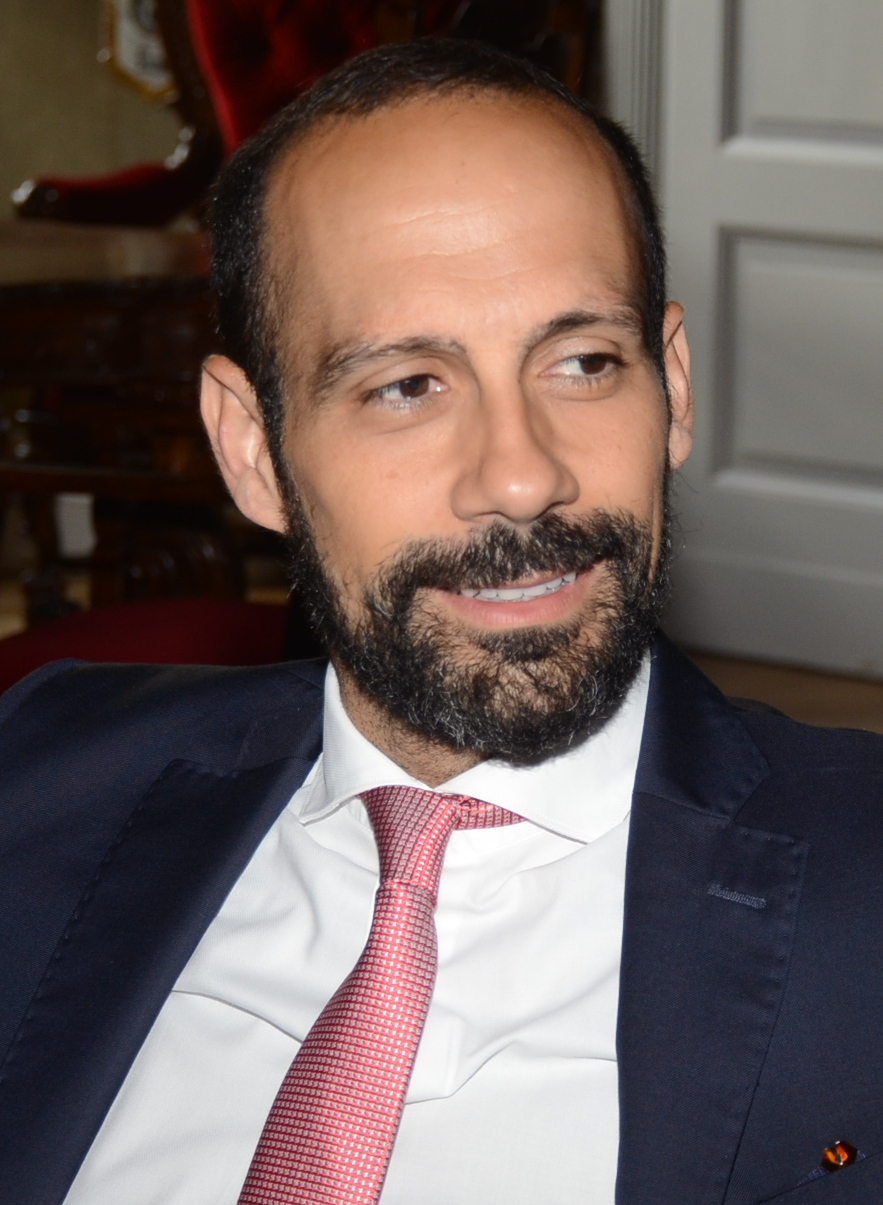
- Incumbent; Michele Lissia (PD) since 11 June 2024
- Appointer: Electorate of Pavia
- Term length: 5 years, renewable once
- Formation: 1860
- Website: Official website

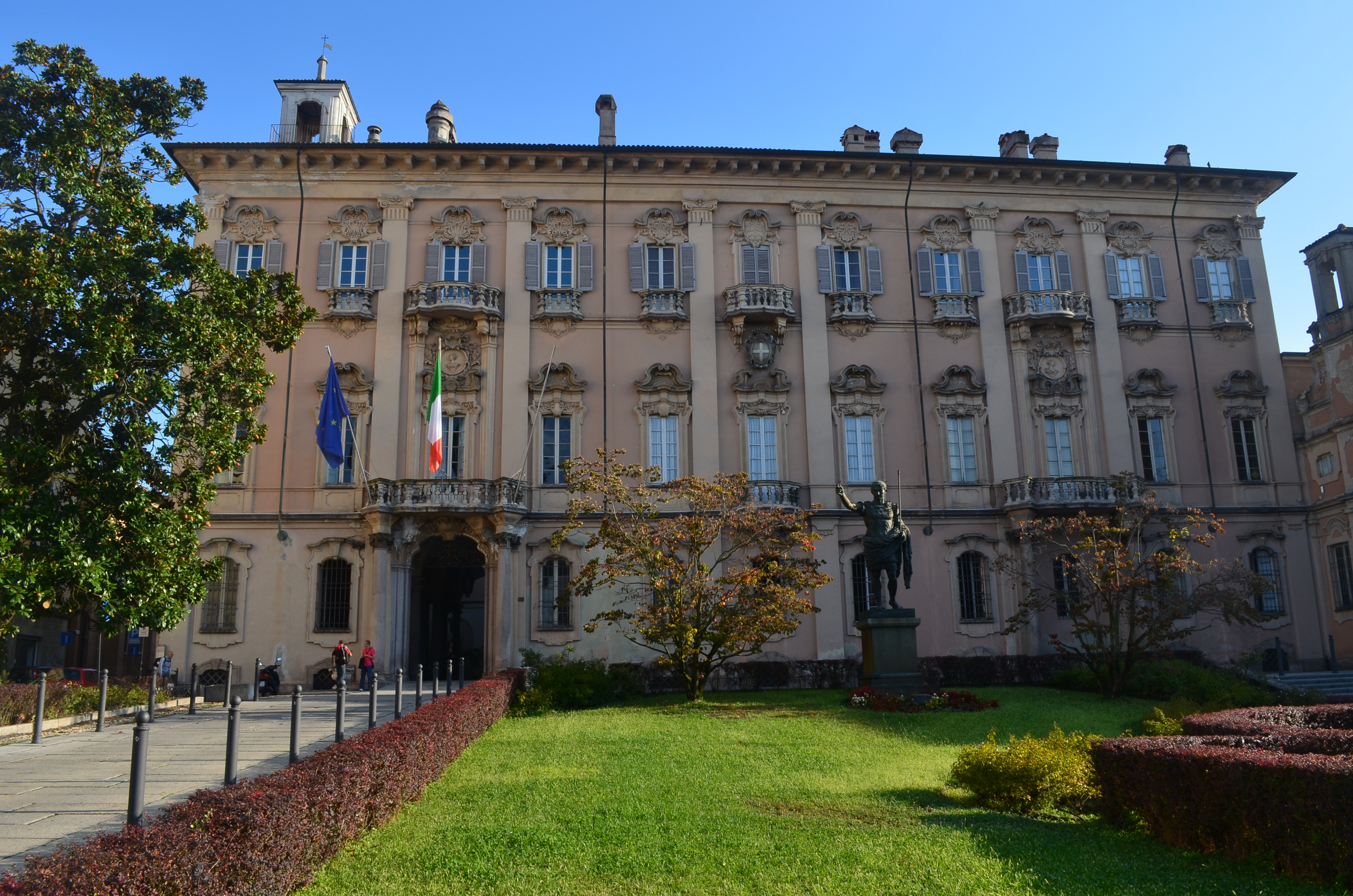
Palazzo Mezzabarba is the seat of the Mayor of Pavia.

The mayor of Pavia is an elected politician who, along with the Pavia's city council, is accountable for the strategic government of Pavia in Lombardy, Italy.

The current mayor is Michele Lissia, a member of the centre-left Democratic Party, who took office on 11 June 2024.

== Overview ==
According to the Italian Constitution, the mayor of Pavia is member of the city council.

The mayor is elected by the population of Pavia, who also elect the members of the city council, controlling the mayor's policy guidelines and is able to enforce his resignation by a motion of no confidence. The mayor is entitled to appoint and release the members of his government.

Since 1993 the mayor is elected directly by Pavia's electorate: in all mayoral elections in Italy in cities with a population higher than 15,000 the voters express a direct choice for the mayor or an indirect choice voting for the party of the candidate's coalition. If no candidate receives at least 50% of votes, the top two candidates go to a second round after two weeks. The election of the City Council is based on a direct choice for the candidate with a preference vote: the candidate with the majority of the preferences is elected. The number of the seats for each party is determined proportionally.

== Republic of Italy (since 1946) ==
=== City Council election (1946-1993) ===
From 1946 to 1993, the Mayor of Pavia was elected by the City Council.

	Mayor	Term start	Term end	Party
1	Cornelio Fietta	1946	1948	PSI
2	Carlo Milani	1948	1951	DC
3	Alberto Ricevuti	1951	1956	DC
4	Bruno Fassina	1956	1964	DC
5	Giovanni Vaccari	1964	1970	PSDI
6	Sesto Bajno	1970	1970	DC
7	Angelo Biancardi	1970	1971	PSI
Special Prefectural Commissioner tenure (1971–1973)
8	Elio Veltri	1973	1980	PSI
9	Giorgio Maini	1980	1986	PCI
10	Pierangelo Giovanolla	1986	1988	PCI
11	Sandro Bruni	1988	1990	DC
12	Sandro Cantone	1990	1993	DC

=== Direct election (since 1993) ===
Since 1993, under provisions of new local administration law, the Mayor of Pavia is chosen by direct election, originally every four then every five years.

	Mayor	Term start	Term end	Party	Coalition	Election
13	Rodolfo Jannacone Pazzi	20 June 1993	24 October 1995 (Note: Ousted out of office after losing the majority in the City Council.)	LN	LN	1993
Special Prefectural Commissioner tenure (24 October 1995 – 24 June 1996)
14	Andrea Albergati	24 June 1996	30 April 2000	PPI	PDS • PPI • RI • SI • FdV	1996
14	Andrea Albergati	30 April 2000	18 April 2005	PPI	DS • PPI • PdCI • SDI	2000
15	Piera Capitelli	18 April 2005	28 January 2009 (Note: Ousted out of office after losing the majority in the City Council.)	DS; PD	DS • DL • PdCI • SDI	2005
Special Prefectural Commissioner tenure (28 January 2009 – 8 June 2009)
16	Alessandro Cattaneo	8 June 2009	9 June 2014	PdL	PdL • LN • UDC	2009
17	Massimo Depaoli	9 June 2014	2 April 2019 (Note: Resigned after losing the majority in the City Council.)	PD	PD	2014
Special Prefectural Commissioner tenure (2 April 2019 – 30 May 2019)
18	Fabrizio Fracassi	30 May 2019	11 June 2024	LN	LN • FI • FdI	2019
19	Michele Lissia	11 June 2024	Incumbent	PD	PD • AVS • M5S • A	2024

== See also ==
- Timeline of Pavia

== Bibliography ==
- Arecchi, Alberto (1998). Mille nomi nella storia di Pavia. Pavia: Associazione culturale Liutprand.
