= List of mayors of Vercelli =

Mayor of Vercelli
- Sindaco di Vercelli

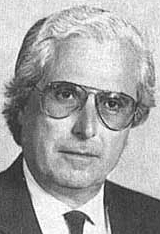
- Incumbent; Roberto Scheda since 26 June 2024
- Appointer: Popular election
- Term length: 5 years, renewable once
- Website: Official website

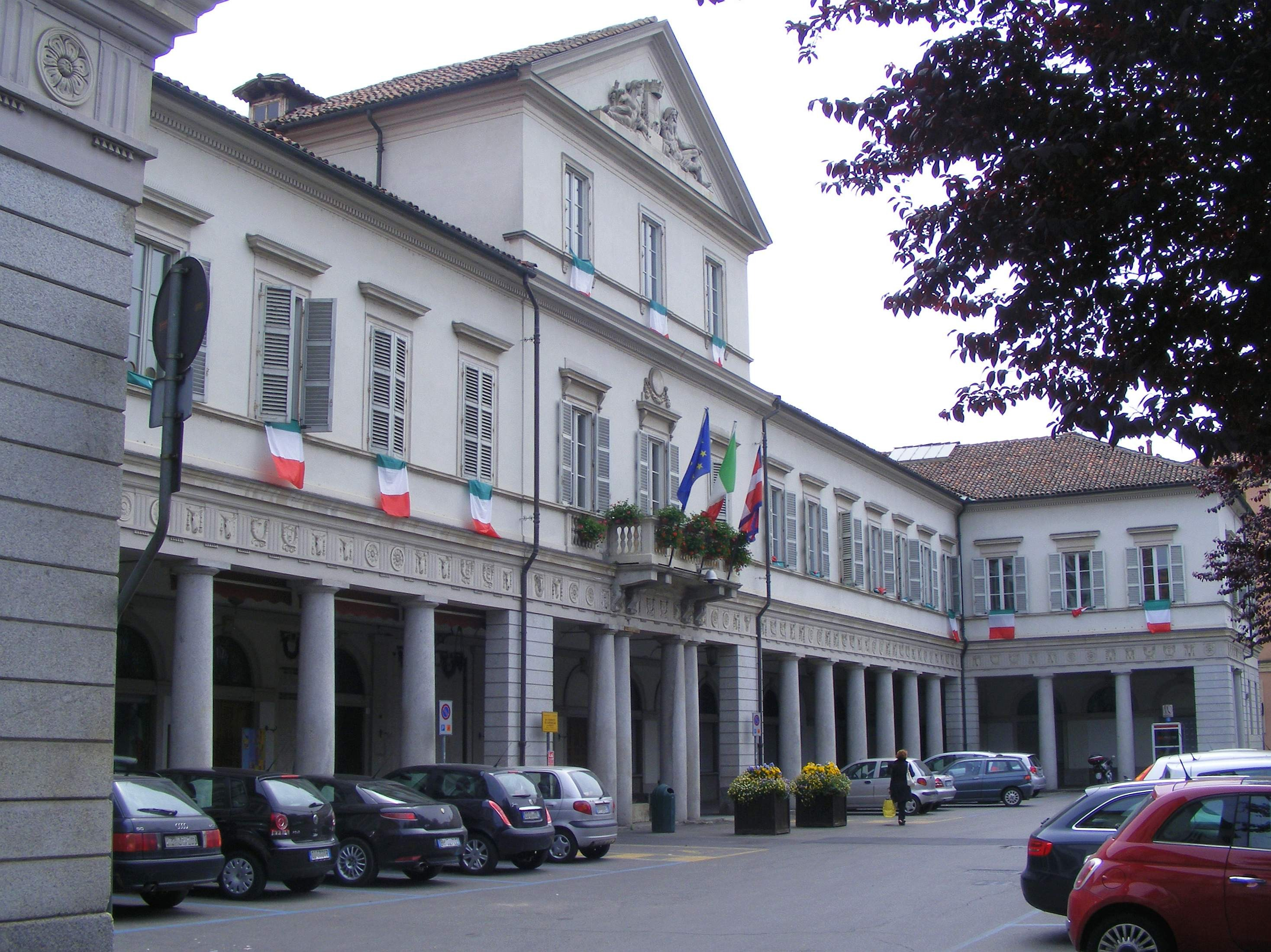
Vercelli's Town Hall

The mayor of Vercelli is an elected politician who, along with the Vercelli City Council, is accountable for the strategic government of Vercelli in Piedmont, Italy.

The current mayor is Roberto Scheda, a centre-right independent, who took office on 26 June 2024.

== Overview ==
According to the Italian Constitution, the mayor of Vercelli is a member of the city council.

The mayor is elected by the population of Vercelli, who also elects the members of the city council, controlling the mayor's policy guidelines and is able to enforce his resignation by a motion of no confidence. The mayor is entitled to appoint and release the members of his government.

Since 1993 the mayor has been elected directly by Vercelli's electorate: in all mayoral elections in Italy in cities with a population higher than 15,000, the voters express a direct choice for the mayor or an indirect choice voting for the party of the candidate's coalition. If no candidate receives at least 50% of votes, the top two candidates go to a second round after two weeks. The election of the City Council is based on a direct choice for the candidate with a preference vote: the candidate with the majority of the preferences is elected. The number of seats for each party is determined proportionally.

== Italian Republic (since 1946) ==
=== City Council election (1946-1993) ===
From 1946 to 1993, the Mayor of Vercelli was elected by the City Council.

	Mayor	Term start	Term end	Party
1	Vittore Domiglio	7 April 1946	31 December 1947	PCI
2	Francesco Ansaldi	31 December 1947	15 March 1949	PCI
Special Prefectural Commissioner tenure (15 March 1949 – 9 July 1949)
3	Mino Pretti	9 July 1949	6 December 1952	DC
4	Giorgio Berzero	6 December 1952	15 October 1958	DC
5	Giuseppe Franchino	15 October 1958	27 February 1962	DC
(4)	Giorgio Berzero	27 February 1962	11 February 1963	DC
6	Baldassarre Buffa	11 February 1963	12 February 1966	DC
(3)	Mino Pretti	12 February 1966	16 September 1970	DC
7	Carlo Boggio	16 September 1970	20 August 1975	DC
8	Ennio Baiardi	20 August 1975	24 May 1983	PCI
9	Ezio Robotti	24 May 1983	23 September 1985	PCI
10	Fulvio Bodo	23 September 1985	3 November 1992	PSI
Special Prefectural Commissioner tenure (3 November 1992 – 30 June 1993)

=== Direct election (since 1993) ===
Since 1993, under provisions of new local administration law, the Mayor of Vercelli is chosen by direct election, originally every four, then every five years.

	Mayor	Term start	Term end	Party	Coalition	Election
11	Mietta Baracchi Bavagnoli	30 June 1993	22 November 1994 (Note: Ousted from office after the City Council passed a motion of no confidence towards her.)	LN	LN	1993
Special Prefectural Commissioner tenure (22 November 1994 – 8 May 1995)
12	Gabriele Bagnasco	8 May 1995	28 June 1999	FdV	PDS • FdV	1995
12	Gabriele Bagnasco	28 June 1999	28 June 2004	FdV	PRC • FdV	1999
13	Andrea Corsaro	28 June 2004	8 June 2009	FI; PdL	FI • AN • UDC	2004
13	Andrea Corsaro	8 June 2009	11 June 2014	FI; PdL	PdL • LN • UDC	2009
14	Maura Forte	11 June 2014	12 June 2019	PD	PD	2014
(13)	Andrea Corsaro	12 June 2019	26 June 2024	FI	FI • Lega • FdI	2019
15	Roberto Scheda	26 June 2024	Incumbent	Ind	FI • Lega • FdI	2024
