= Marco Cavicchioli =

Italian politician (born 1969)

Mayor of Biella
- In office 10 June 2014 – 14 June 2019
- Preceded by: Donato Gentile
- Succeeded by: Claudio Corradino

Personal details
- Born: 31 January 1969 (age 57) Biella, Piedmont, Italy
- Party: Democratic Party
- Profession: lawyer

Marco Cavicchioli (born 31 January 1969 in Biella) is an Italian politician.

He is a member of the Democratic Party and he was elected Mayor of Biella on 8 June 2014 and took office on 10 June. Cavicchioli ran for a second term at the 2019 Italian local elections, but he was not re-elected.

== See also ==
- 2014 Italian local elections
- List of mayors of Biella

Political offices
Preceded by Donato Gentile	Mayor of Biella; 2014–2019	Succeeded by Claudio Corradino
