= Maura Forte =

Italian politician

Mayor of Vercelli
- In office 11 June 2014 – 12 June 2019
- Preceded by: Andrea Corsaro
- Succeeded by: Andrea Corsaro

Personal details
- Born: 1 November 1959 (age 66) Villata, Piedmont, Italy
- Party: Democratic Party
- Education: University of Pavia
- Profession: teacher

Maura Forte (born 1 November 1959 in Villata) is an Italian politician.

She is a member of the Democratic Party and she was elected Mayor of Vercelli on 8 June 2014 and took office on 11 June. Forte ran for a second term at the 2019 local elections, but lost at the second round to former mayor Andrea Corsaro.

== Biography ==
Born in Villata in 1959, she completed her high school studies at the Agricultural Institute of Vercelli and went on to earn a degree in biological sciences from the University of Pavia. After graduating, she worked as an entrepreneur running a company that produced blood products, and beginning in 1994, she taught chemistry at the Avogadro Scientific High School in Vercelli, where she also served as vice principal.

In the 2014 local elections, she ran for mayor of Vercelli, backed by a center-left coalition consisting of the Democratic Party (Italy), Civic Choice, and civic slates. In the second round on June 8, she defeated the center-right candidate Enrico Demaria, winning 67% of the vote.

In December 2018, he announced his candidacy for a second term ahead of the 2019 local elections, but lost in the runoff to the former mayor and his predecessor, Andrea Corsaro.

== See also ==
- 2014 Italian local elections
- List of mayors of Vercelli

Political offices
Preceded by Andrea Corsaro	Mayor of Vercelli; 2014–2019	Succeeded by Andrea Corsaro
