= Gianluca Susta =

Italian politician (born 1956)

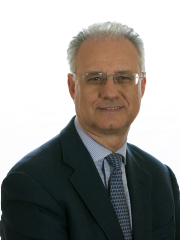

Member of the Italian Senate
- In office 15 March 2013 – 22 March 2018

Vice-President of Piedmont
- In office 5 April 2005 – 9 April 2010

Member of the European Parliament
- In office 2006–2013

Mayor of Biella
- In office 14 December 1992 – 28 June 2004
- Preceded by: Luigi Petrini
- Succeeded by: Vittorio Barazzotto

Personal details
- Born: 10 April 1956 (age 70) Biella, Piedmont, Italy
- Party: Christian Democracy (1974-1994); Italian People's Party (1994-2002); The Daisy (2002-2007); Democratic Party (since 2007)
- Education: University of Turin
- Profession: lawyer

Gianluca Susta (born 10 April 1956, Biella) is an Italian politician and a member of the Italian Senate, to which he was elected in February 2013. Previously, he served as Mayor of Biella from 1992 to 2004 and was a member of the European Parliament from 8 May 2006, when he took up a seat vacated after the 2006 Italian general election, until his election to the Italian Senate. He represents Margherita within the ALDE parliamentary group and supports a pro-European stance by his signing the Spinelli Group Manifesto.
