= List of mayors of Biella =

Mayor of Biella
- Sindaco di Biella
- Incumbent; Marzio Olivero (FdI) since 12 June 2024
- Appointer: Popular election
- Term length: 5 years, renewable once
- Website: Official website

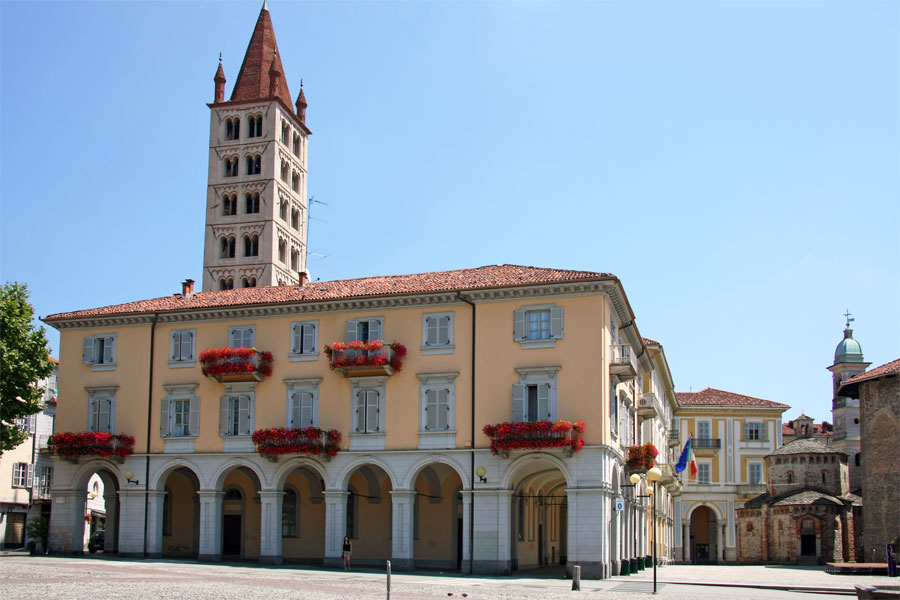
Palazzo Municipale is the seat of the Mayor of Biella.

The Mayor of Biella is an elected politician who, along with the Biella's city council, is accountable for the strategic government of Biella in Piedmont, Italy.

The current mayor is Marzio Olivero, a member of the far-right party Brothers of Italy (FdI), who took office on 12 June 2024.

== Overview ==
According to the Italian Constitution, the mayor of Biella is member of the city council.

The mayor is elected by the population of Biella, who also elects the members of the city council, controlling the mayor's policy guidelines and is able to enforce his resignation by a motion of no confidence. The mayor is entitled to appoint and release the members of his government.

Since 1994 the mayor is elected directly by Biella's electorate: in all mayoral elections in Italy in cities with a population higher than 15,000 the voters express a direct choice for the mayor or an indirect choice voting for the party of the candidate's coalition. If no candidate receives at least 50% of votes, the top two candidates go to a second round after two weeks. The election of the city council is based on a direct choice for the candidate with a preference vote: the candidate with the majority of the preferences is elected. The number of the seats for each party is determined proportionally.

== Republic of Italy (since 1946) ==
=== City council election (1946-1995) ===
From 1946 to 1995, the mayor of Biella was elected by the City Council.

	Mayor	Term start	Term end	Party
1	Virgilio Luisetti	1946	1949	PSI
2	Mario Coda Spirito	1949	1951	PCI
3	Bruno Blotto Baldo	1951	1960	DC
4	Novellino Casalvolone	1960	1964	DC
5	Franco Borri Brunetto	1964	1980	DC
6	Luigi Squillario	1980	1990	DC
7	Luigi Petrini	1990	1992	DC
8	Gianluca Susta	1992	1995	DC

=== Direct election (since 1995) ===
Since 1995, under provisions of new local administration law, the Mayor of Biella is chosen by direct election, originally every four, than every five years.

	Mayor	Term start	Term end	Party	Coalition	Election
8	Gianluca Susta	8 May 1995	28 June 1999	PPI; DL	PDS • PPI	1995
8	Gianluca Susta	28 June 1999	28 June 2004	PPI; DL	DS • PPI • SDI	1999
9	Vittorio Barazzotto	28 June 2004	8 June 2009	DL; PD	DS • DL • PdCI	2004
10	Donato Gentile	8 June 2009	10 June 2014	PdL	PdL • LN	2009
11	Marco Cavicchioli	10 June 2014	14 June 2019	PD	PD	2014
12	Claudio Corradino	14 June 2019	12 June 2024	Lega	FI • Lega • FdI	2019
13	Marzio Olivero	12 June 2024	Incumbent	FdI	FI • Lega • FdI	2024
