= List of presidents of the Province of Forlì-Cesena =

President of the Province of Forlì-Cesena
- Presidente della Provincia di Forlì-Cesena

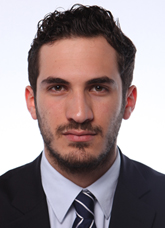
- Incumbent; Enzo Lattuca since 20 December 2021
- Term length: 4 years
- Inaugural holder: Giuseppe Brasini
- Formation: 1889

The president of the Province of Forlì-Cesena is the head of the provincial government in Forlì-Cesena, Emilia-Romagna, Italy. The president oversees the administration of the province, coordinates the activities of the municipalities, and represents the province in regional and national matters.

Since December 2021, the office has been held by Enzo Lattuca of the Democratic Party.

== List ==
=== Presidents of the Provincial Deputation (1889–1926) ===
No.	Portrait	Name	Term		Party
No.	Portrait	Name	Start	End	Party
1		Giuseppe Brasini	1889	1894	?
2		Francesco Vendemini	1894	1905	?
3		Clerzio Casati	1905	1907	?
4		Giovanni Renzi	1907	1908	?
5		Achille Renzi	1908	1910	?
6		Giuseppe Bellini	1910	1913	Italian Republican Party
(5)		Achille Renzi	1914	?	?

=== Presidents of the Province (1951–present) ===
No.	Portrait	Name	Term		Party
No.	Portrait	Name	Start	End	Party
		?	?	?	?
		Alessandro Guidi	?	23 July 1990	Italian Socialist Party
		Carlo Sarpieri	23 July 1990	16 May 1994	Italian Communist Party; Democratic Party of the Left
		Maria Luisa Bargossi	16 May 1994	24 April 1995	Democratic Party of the Left
		Piero Gallina	24 April 1995	14 June 1999	Italian Republican Party
		Piero Gallina	14 June 1999	21 June 2004	Italian Republican Party
		Massimo Bulbi	21 June 2004	22 June 2009	The Daisy (2004–2007); Democratic Party (2007–2014)
		Massimo Bulbi	22 June 2009	13 October 2014	The Daisy (2004–2007); Democratic Party (2007–2014)
		Davide Drei	13 October 2014	31 October 2018	Democratic Party
		Gabriele Antonio Fratto	31 October 2018	11 October 2021	Independent (centre-left)
–		Cristina Nicoletti (acting)	11 October 2021	20 December 2021	Independent (centre-left)
		Enzo Lattuca	20 December 2021	16 March 2026	Democratic Party
		Enzo Lattuca	16 March 2026	Incumbent	Democratic Party

== Sources ==
- "Storia amministrativa dell'ente". Ministero dell'Interno.
- Menichini, Piera (2005). "I presidenti delle Province dall'Unità alla Grande guerra: repertorio analitico". Storia Amministrazione Costituzione (13): 251–252.
