= Parco della Resistenza in Forlì =

Coordinates: 44°13′02″N 12°02′57″E

Parco della Resistenza in Forlì

The Parco della Resistenza ('Resistance Park') is a city park in Forlì, Italy.

It was engineered by L. Mirri in 1816 on a typical illuministic framework and renovated twice during the following century. The park was built after the fashion of typical Italian gardens although at that stage the English landscape gardens were becoming very popular too.

During those days, the center of the garden was occupied by an obelisk surrounded by symmetrical flower beds. Four more smaller centralities were distributed around four statues representing the four seasons. At the garden bottom there stood a small temple, the Kafeehaus and the keeper's house.

In 1928 the garden was completely renovated by the engineer G. Santarelli. To obtain a better drainage, the soil level was raised and pedestrians walks were separated from coaches tracks. The three bottom buildings were replaced by one single service building. During the 1970s, further works were undertaken and the garden was widened up to Viale Spazzoli.

Today the park has two entrances, one in Viale Spazzoli and a second entrance in Piazzale della Vittoria. At the entrance in Piazzale della Vittoria the municipality of Forlì has offered since 2002 a free bike-hiring service.

== Photo gallery ==
Fountain

Bike-hiring service
