= Enzo Lattuca =

Italian politician

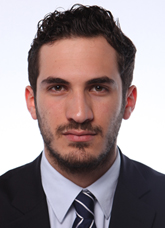

Mayor of Cesena
- Incumbent
- Assumed office 10 June 2019
- Preceded by: Paolo Lucchi

President of the Province of Forlì-Cesena
- Incumbent
- Assumed office 19 December 2021
- Preceded by: Gabriele Antonio Fratto

Member of the Chamber of Deputies
- In office 15 March 2013 – 22 March 2018
- Constituency: Emilia-Romagna

Personal details
- Born: February 9, 1988 (age 38) Cesena, Italy
- Party: DS (until 2007); PD (since 2007)
- Education: University of Bologna

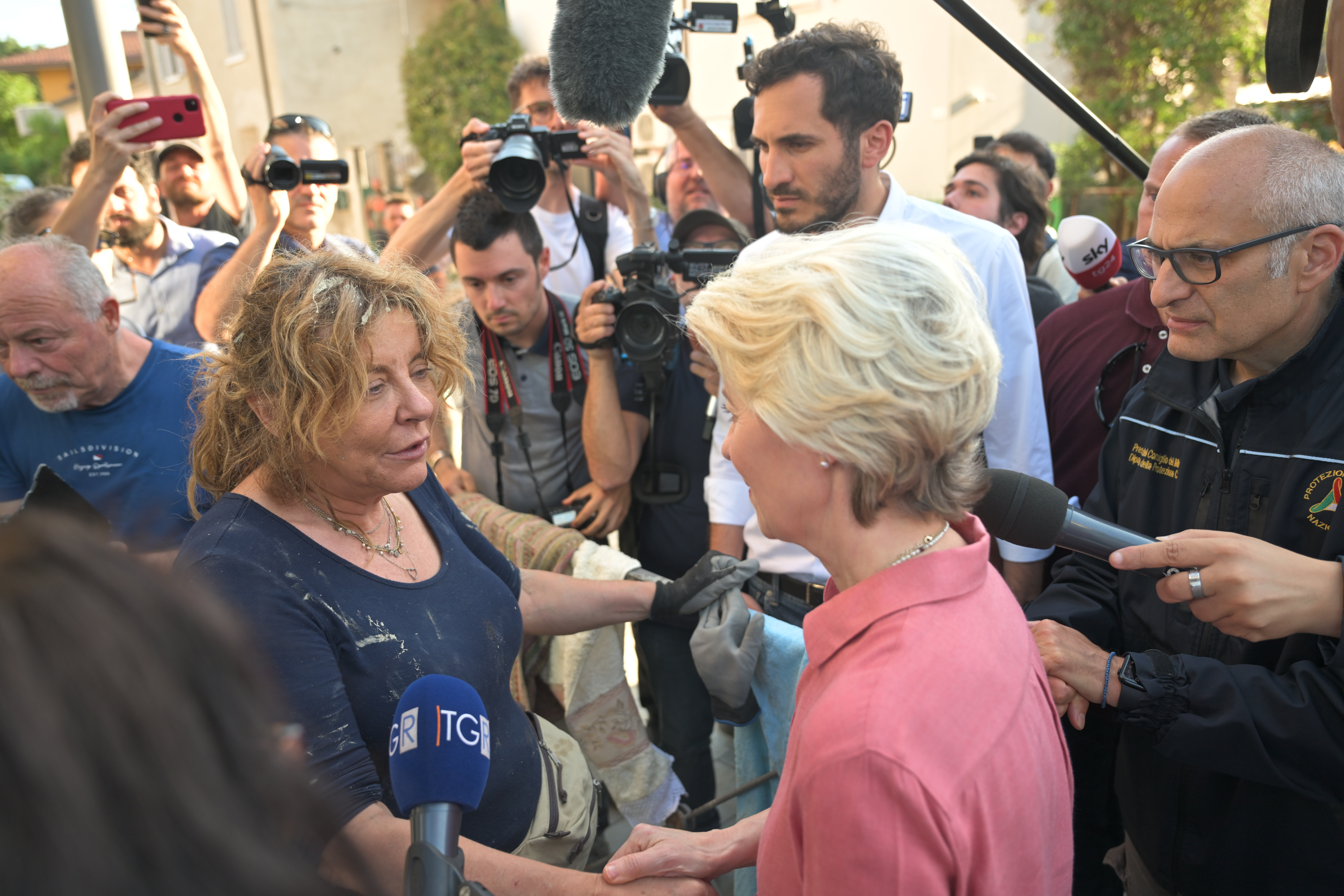
Enzo Lattuca with EU Commission President Ursula von der Leyen in Cesena.

Enzo Lattuca (born 9 February 1988) is an Italian politician, former deputy of the Italian Republic, mayor of Cesena since 2019 and current President of the Union of Valle Savio Municipalities.

== Biography ==
=== Studies ===
Graduated in 2007 at the Augusto Righi Scientific High School in Cesena, in July 2012, he obtained a master's degree in Law at the University of Bologna with a thesis in Constitutional Law entitled "The powers of the President of the Republic in training, crises and activities of the Government". Subsequently, in 2017, he obtained - again at the University of Bologna - the title of PhD in Constitutional Law, discussing a thesis on "Parliamentary law, study of the practice of the XVII Legislature of the Chamber of Deputies".

=== Personal life ===
He lives with Giorgia and is the father of two children: Tommaso (born in 2017) and Pietro (born in 2019).

== Political activity ==
Since 2009, he has been a municipal councilor of Cesena and, since 2010, he has held the position of municipal secretary of the Democratic Party.

In December 2012, he won the parliamentary primary of the PD Cesena, winning 3,918 preferences out of 5,892 voters.

=== Member of the Chamber of Deputies ===
In the general elections of February, 2013, he was elected deputy, becoming the youngest member of parliament of the 17th legislature and in the entire history of Italy, having turned 25 years and 15 days at the time of the vote.

On May 9, 2013, he announced his resignation as councilor of Cesena, reasons therefore with the "objective difficulties" involved in the maintenance of the dual role of parliamentary and municipal councilor, as well as the belief gained about the inappropriateness of asking for a derogation from the prohibition dual role established by the statute of the PD.

On May 4, 2015, he opposed voting for Italicum, the new electoral law approved by the House.

=== Mayor of Cesena ===
On 9 June 2019, he was elected mayor of the city of Cesena defeating center-right candidate Andrea Rossi in the ballot with 55.74%. On the occasion of the first session of the new city council, on 27 June 2019, he sworn in as the new mayor of the city.

== Controversy ==
On 25 October 2013, the deputy of the Five Star Movement Maria Edera Spadoni accused him of physical and verbal assault against her, therefore asking the Bureau of the Chamber to evaluate the episode for disciplinary purposes. In a note, the deputy PD contested the reconstruction of the facts, denying any aggressive intent against the colleague.

On 11 December 2013, the Bureau of the Chamber took note of the fact that a mere verbal altercation took place between the two deputies, also arranging "by way of exception [...] to make available on the website the video recording of this episode in consideration of the media coverage that the same has had", in which the gesture of knocking made on the head of the M5S deputy and consequently the clerks of the Chamber who dragged away the deputy of the PD. Lattuca, after expressing his satisfaction with the conclusions of the Bureau, made a request for a public apology to him by the deputy Giorgio Sorialfor "having declared that I had put my hands on my colleague Spadoni".
