= List of mayors of Rovigo =

Mayor of Rovigo
- Sindaco di Rovigo
- Incumbent; Valeria Cittadin since 26 June 2024
- Appointer: Popular election
- Term length: 5 years, renewable once
- Formation: 1860
- Website: Official website

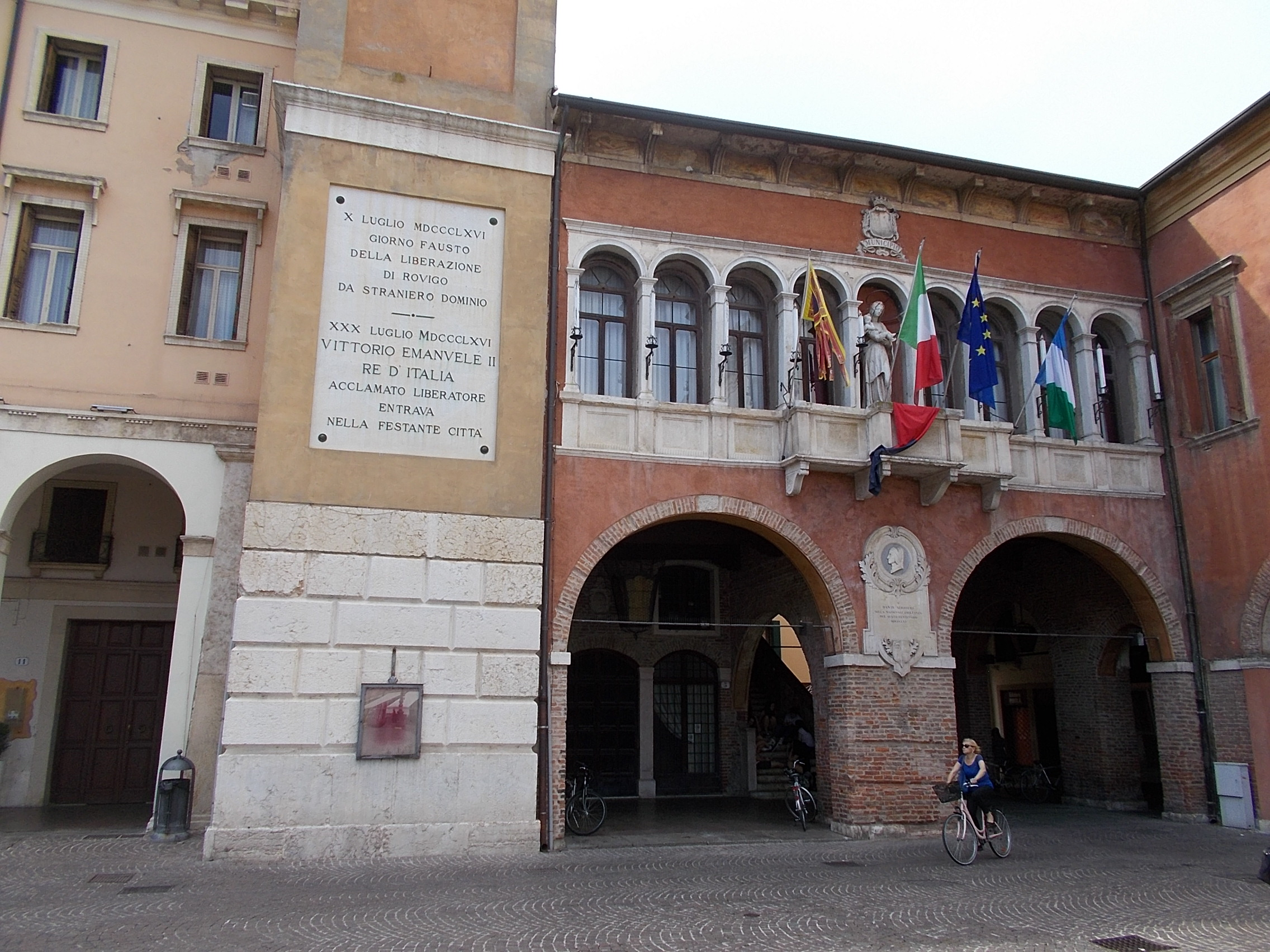
Rovigo's Town Hall.

The mayor of Rovigo is an elected politician who, along with the Rovigo City Council, is accountable for the strategic government of Rovigo in Veneto, Italy.

The current mayor is Valeria Cittadin, a centre-right independent, who took office on 26 June 2024.

== Overview ==
According to the Italian Constitution, the mayor of Rovigo is member of the City Council.

The mayor is elected by the population of Rovigo, who also elects the members of the City Council, controlling the mayor's policy guidelines and is able to enforce his resignation by a motion of no confidence. The mayor is entitled to appoint and release the members of his government.

Since 1994 the mayor is elected directly by Rovigo's electorate: in all mayoral elections in Italy in cities with a population higher than 15,000 the voters express a direct choice for the mayor or an indirect choice voting for the party of the candidate's coalition. If no candidate receives at least 50% of votes, the top two candidates go to a second round after two weeks. The election of the City Council is based on a direct choice for the candidate with a preference vote: the candidate with the majority of the preferences is elected. The number of the seats for each party is determined proportionally.

== Italian Republic (since 1946) ==
=== City Council election (1946-1994) ===
From 1946 to 1994, the Mayor of Rovigo was elected by the City Council.

	Mayor	Term start	Term end	Party
1	Silvio Andreotti	1946	1951	PSIUP
2	Giancarlo Morelli	1951	1956	PCI
3	Agostino Zorzato	1956	1970	DC
4	Luigi Bortolussi	1970	1975	DC
5	Giovanni Gavioli	1975	1978	DC
6	Benito Bortolami	1978	1987	DC
7	Carlo Piombo	1987	1990	DC
8	Carlo Brazzorotto	1990	1993	DC
9	Lorenzo Liviero	1993	1993	DC
10	Renzo Marangon	1993	1993	DC
11	Luigi Frezzato	1993	1994	PDS

=== Direct election (since 1994) ===
Since 1994, under provisions of new local administration law, the Mayor of Rovigo is chosen by direct electionis chosen by direct election, originally every four, then every five years.

	Mayor	Term start	Term end	Party	Coalition	Election
12	Fabio Baratella	28 June 1994	26 May 1998	PDS; DS	PDS • PRC	1994
12	Fabio Baratella	26 May 1998	30 November 2000 (Note: Resigned in order to participate to the national general elections.)	PDS; DS	PDS • PPI • SDI • FdV • PRC	1998
Special Prefectural Commissioner tenure (30 November 2000 – 28 May 2001)
13	Paolo Avezzù	28 May 2001	12 June 2006	FI	FI • LN • AN • CCD • CDU	2001
14	Fausto Merchiori	12 June 2006	21 June 2011	DS; PD	DS • DL • SDI • FdV • PRC	2006
15	Bruno Piva	21 June 2011	15 July 2014 (Note: Ousted from office after the majority of the city councillors resigned.)	PdL	PdL • LN	2011
Special Prefectural Commissioner tenure (15 July 2014 – 16 June 2015)
16	Massimo Bergamin	16 June 2015	22 February 2019 (Note: Ousted from office after the majority of the city councillors resigned.)	LN	FI • LN	2015
Special Prefectural Commissioner tenure (22 February 2019 – 13 June 2019)
17	Edoardo Gaffeo	13 June 2019	15 February 2024 (Note: Resigned after losing the majority in the City Council.)	Ind	PD	2019
Special Prefectural Commissioner tenure (15 February 2024 – 26 June 2024)
18	Valentina Cittadin	26 June 2024	Incumbent	Ind	FI • Lega • FdI	2024
