= Vittoria Ferdinandi =

Italian politician

Mayor of Perugia
- Incumbent
- Assumed office 25 June 2024
- Preceded by: Andrea Romizi

Personal details
- Born: 4 September 1986 (age 40) Perugia, Italy
- Party: Centre-left independent
- Education: University of Perugia
- Profession: Social entrepreneur, psychologist, activist

Vittoria Ferdinandi OMRI (born 4 September 1986) is an Italian politician and entrepreneur, mayor of Perugia since 2024 and the first woman to hold this office.

== Biography ==
Graduated in philosophy and in clinical psychology, Ferdinandi was appointed Knight of the Republic by President Sergio Mattarella in 2021 for her commitment to the establishment and management of the Numero Zero restaurant and social enterprise, located in the historic center of Perugia. The restaurant, managed with the RealMente social promotion association, has an inclusive staff, including different forms of mental disorder, whose carriers are valued beyond simple job placement.

=== Mayor of Perugia ===
In the 2024 local elections, Ferdinandi became the centre-left candidate for the office of Mayor of Perugia, supported by the Democratic Party, the Greens and Left Alliance, the Five Star Movement and Action. She was elected in the run-off with the 52.12% of votes, thus becoming the first woman to lead the city of Perugia.
