= List of mayors of Forlì =

Mayor of Forlì
- Sindaco di Forlì
- Incumbent; Gian Luca Zattini since 11 June 2019
- Appointer: Popular election
- Term length: 5 years, renewable once
- Formation: 1860
- Website: Official website

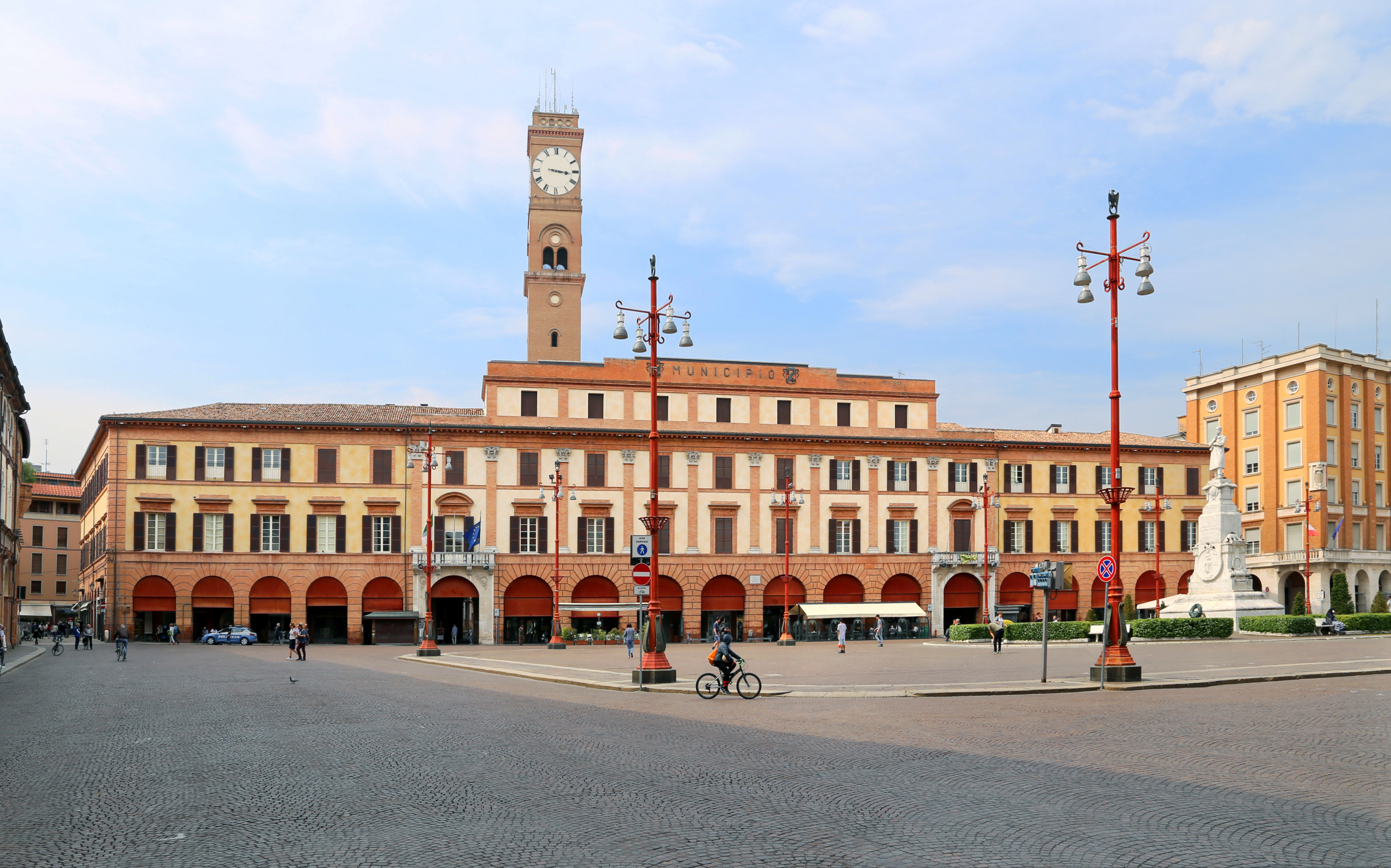
Forlì's Town Hall.

The mayor of Forlì is an elected politician who, along with the Forlì City Council, is accountable for the strategic government of Forlì in Emilia-Romagna, Italy.

The current mayor is Gian Luca Zattini, a centre-right independent, who took office on 11 June 2019.

== Overview ==
According to the Italian Constitution, the mayor of Forlì is member of the City Council.

The mayor is elected by the population of Forlì, who also elect the members of the City Council, controlling the mayor's policy guidelines and is able to enforce his resignation by a motion of no confidence. The mayor is entitled to appoint and release the members of his government.

Since 1993 the mayor is elected directly by Forlì's electorate: in all mayoral elections in Italy in cities with a population higher than 15,000 the voters express a direct choice for the mayor or an indirect choice voting for the party of the candidate's coalition. If no candidate receives at least 50% of votes, the top two candidates go to a second round after two weeks. The election of the City Council is based on a direct choice for the candidate with a preference vote: the candidate with the majority of the preferences is elected. The number of the seats for each party is determined proportionally.

== Kingdom of Italy (1861–1946) ==
In 1860, the Kingdom of Italy created the office of the mayor of Forlì (Sindaco di Forlì), appointed by the King himself. From 1889 to 1926 the mayor was elected by the City Council.

In 1926, the Fascist dictatorship abolished mayors and City councils, replacing them with an authoritarian Podestà chosen by the National Fascist Party. The office of mayor was restored in 1945 during the Allied occupation.

	Mayor	Term start	Term end	Party
1	Giovanni Romagnoli	1860	1861	Ind
2	Pellegrino Canestri Trotti	1861	1866	Right
3	Augusto Matteucci	1866	1868	Right
4	Alessandro Mazzoni	1868	1878	Left
(3)	Augusto Matteucci	1878	1883	Right
5	Gaetano Ghinassi	1883	1889	Left
6	Ercole Adriano Ceccarelli	1889	1894	Far Left
7	Domenico Manzoni	1894	1898	Left
8	Curzio Casati	1898	1901	Left
9	Giuseppe Bellini	1901	1910	PRI
10	Giuseppe Gaudenzi	1910	1915	PRI
(9)	Giuseppe Bellini	1915	1919	PRI
(10)	Giuseppe Gaudenzi	1919	1923	PRI
11	Corrado Panciatichi	1923	1926	PNF
Fascist Podestà (1926–1945)
1	Ercole Gaddi Pepoli	1926	1930	PNF
2	Mario Fabbri	1930	1936	PNF
3	Fante Luigi Panciatichi	1936	1940	PNF
4	Franco Melli	1940	1942	PNF
5	Renato Rossi	1942	1943	PNF
6	Attiliano Tancini	1943	1945	PFR
Allied occupation (1945–1946)
12	Franco Agosto	1945	1946	PCI

== Italian Republic (since 1946) ==
=== City Council election (1946–1995) ===
From 1946 to 1995, the mayor of Forlì was elected by the City Council.

	Mayor	Term start	Term end	Party
1	Franco Agosto	1946	1951	PCI
2	Francesco Simoncini	1951	1952	PRI
3	Mario Colletto	1952	1956	PRI
4	Icilio Missiroli	1956	1965	PRI
Special Prefectural Commissioner tenure (1966–1970)
5	Angelo Satanassi	1970	1979	PCI
6	Giorgio Zanniboni	1979	1989	PCI
7	Sauro Sedioli	1989	1995	PDS

=== Direct election (since 1995) ===
Since 1995, under provisions of new local administration law, the mayor of Forlì is chosen by direct election, originally every four, then every five years.

	Mayor	Term start	Term end	Party	Coalition	Election
8	Franco Rusticali	24 April 1995	14 June 1999	PDS; DS	PDS • PPI • PRI	1995
8	Franco Rusticali	14 June 1999	14 June 2004	PDS; DS	DS • PPI • PdCI • PRI	1999
9	Nadia Masini	14 June 2004	23 June 2009	DS; PD	DS • DL • PRC • FdV • PRI	2004
10	Roberto Balzani	23 June 2009	28 May 2014	PD	PD • IdV	2009
11	Davide Drei	28 May 2014	11 June 2019	PD	PD	2014
12	Gian Luca Zattini	11 June 2019	10 June 2024	Ind	Lega • FI • FdI	2019
12	Gian Luca Zattini	10 June 2024	Incumbent	Ind	FdI • FI • Lega • PRI	2024
