= Massimo Depaoli =

Italian politician

Mayor of Pavia
- In office 9 June 2014 – 2 April 2019
- Preceded by: Alessandro Cattaneo
- Succeeded by: Fabrizio Fracassi

Personal details
- Born: 10 October 1959 (age 66) Turin, Piedmont, Italy
- Party: Democratic Party
- Education: University of Pavia
- Profession: professor

Massimo Depaoli (born 10 October 1959 in Turin) is an Italian politician.

== Biography ==
Graduated from the University of Pavia in 1983, he is a teacher of letters at the "Copernico" high school. Ecologist, he was a militant of Legambiente, whose president was in the nineties for the territory of Pavia.

== Political career ==
Already an exponent of the Federation of the Greens, Depaoli began his political career in 1990, when he was elected councillor and assessor in Garlasco. Member of the Democratic Party, he was the spokesman for the Pavia Ovest Circle from 2008 to 2009. On the occasion of the 2009 municipal elections, he became a municipal councilor on the democratic lists.

He is a member of the Democratic Party. He was elected Mayor of Pavia on 8 June 2014 and took office on 9 June. He resigned on 11 March 2019 and was removed from office on 2 April.

== See also ==
- 2014 Italian local elections
- List of mayors of Pavia

Political offices
Preceded by Alessandro Cattaneo	Mayor of Pavia; 2014-2019	Succeeded by Fabrizio Fracassi
