= Donato Gentile =

Italian politician

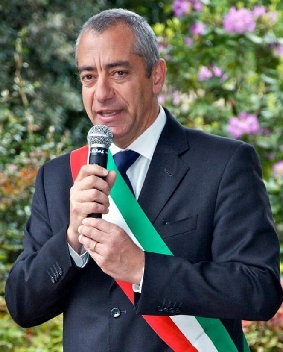

Mayor of Biella
- In office 8 June 2009 – 10 June 2014
- Preceded by: Vittorio Barazzotto
- Succeeded by: Marco Cavicchioli

Personal details
- Born: 15 February 1957 (age 69) Piacenza, Emilia-Romagna, Italy
- Party: The People of Freedom (2009-2013); Forza Italia (since 2013)
- Education: University of Turin
- Profession: teacher

Donato Gentile (born 15 February 1957 in Piacenza) is an Italian politician.

He is a member of the centre-right party Forza Italia and he served as Mayor of Biella from 8 June 2009 to 10 June 2014.

== See also ==
- 2009 Italian local elections
- List of mayors of Biella

Political offices
Preceded by Vittorio Barazzotto	Mayor of Biella; 2009–2014	Succeeded by Marco Cavicchioli
