= Claudio Corradino =

Italian politician (born 1959)

Mayor of Biella
- In office 14 June 2019 – 12 June 2024
- Preceded by: Marco Cavicchioli
- Succeeded by: Marzio Olivero

Personal details
- Born: 25 August 1959 (age 67) Cossato, Province of Vercelli, Italy
- Party: Lega Nord
- Profession: real estate agent

Claudio Corradino (born 25 August 1959) is an Italian politician.

Corradino is a member of the right-wing party Lega Nord and served as mayor of the town of Cossato from 2009 to 2019.

He ran for Mayor of Biella at the 2019 local elections and was elected at the second round on 9 June. He took office on 14 June 2019.

== Biography ==
A real estate agent and IT technician by profession, he entered politics by joining the Lega Nord and running for the Senate of the Republic (Italy) in the 2008 general election, but was not elected. The following year, he ran for mayor of Cossato and was elected in a runoff election. He was re-elected in 2014.

Once his term ended, in 2019 he decided to run for mayor of Biella as part of a center-right coalition, winning the runoff election with 50.98% of the vote against former mayor Donato Gentile. In 2024, he did not seek re-election for a second term, but was elected as a minority council member in Villanova Biellese, thus remaining vice president of ANCI Piedmont.

== See also ==
- 2019 Italian local elections
- List of mayors of Biella

Political offices
Preceded by Marco Cavicchioli	Mayor of Biella; 2019-2024	Succeeded by Marzio Olivero
