= Roberto Scheda =

Italian politician (born 1942)

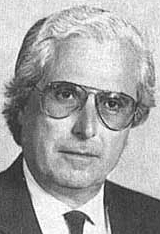

Mayor of Vercelli
- Incumbent
- Assumed office 26 June 2024
- Preceded by: Andrea Corsaro

Member of the Senate of the Republic
- In office 23 April 1992 – 14 April 1994
- Constituency: Biella
- Succeeded by: Stefano Caldoro

Mayor of Rosasco
- In office 8 June 2009 – 26 May 2019
- Preceded by: Vincenzo Gardini
- Succeeded by: Riccardo Berzero Taccone

Personal details
- Born: 30 October 1942 (age 83) Livorno, Kingdom of Italy
- Education: University of Pavia
- Profession: Lawyer

Roberto Scheda (born 30 October 1942) is an Italian politician who has served as Mayor of Vercelli since June 2024. He previously served as mayor of Rosasco (2009–2019) and Senator (1992–1994).

He was also president of the New Italian Socialist Party from 2007 to 2009.

== Biography ==
After earning a law degree from the University of Pavia, he became a lawyer.

He served as the Socialist deputy mayor of Vercelli from 1975 to 1977, as a city councilor from 1970 to 1975, as a city council member from 1970 to 1981, and as president of the Cassa di Risparmio di Vercelli from 1981 to 1992.

In the 1992 general election, he was elected to the Senate of the Republic (Italy) in the Biella constituency for the 11th Italian legislature, running on the Italian Socialist Party ticket. He served as President of the Vercelli Provincial Council from 1999 to 2002. During those years, he also served as regional secretary of the New Italian Socialist Party in Piedmont.

Councilor for Public Works and Infrastructure in the municipality of Vercelli from 2004 to 2014, first with the New PSI and later with the People of Freedom party; from 2009 to 2019, he served as mayor of Rosasco in the Province of Pavia.
