= Edoardo Gaffeo =

Italian politician

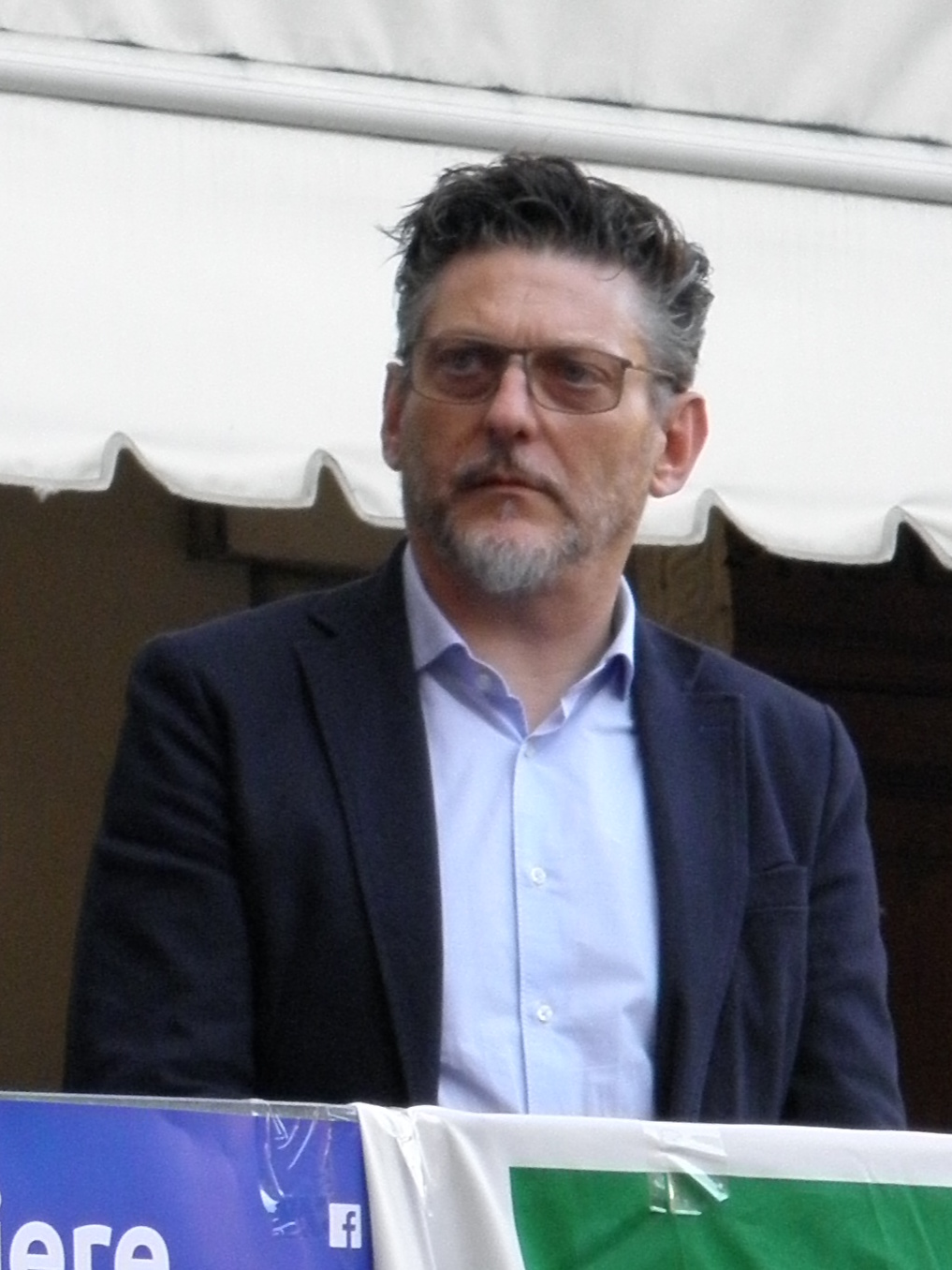

Mayor of Rovigo
- In office 13 June 2019 – 15 February 2024
- Preceded by: Massimo Bergamin
- Succeeded by: Valeria Cittadin

Personal details
- Born: 12 August 1967 (age 59) Rovigo, Veneto, Italy
- Party: Independent (centre-left)
- Education: University of Bologna
- Profession: University professor

Edoardo Gaffeo (born 12 August 1967 in Rovigo) is an Italian politician.

Gaffeo ran for Mayor of Rovigo at the 2019 Italian local elections, supported by a centre-left coalition. He was elected on 10 June and took office on 13 June 2019.

== Biography ==
Born in Rovigo, he earned a bachelor’s degree in economics and business from the University of Bologna in 1992 and subsequently received his Ph.D. in political economy from the Marche Polytechnic University in 1997. He began his academic career as a researcher, with a stint from 1997 to 1999 at the Confindustria Research Center. In 2010, he became an associate professor of political economy, and since 2018, he has been a full professor of economic policy at the University of Trento.

He served on the board of directors of Interporto di Rovigo (2003–2005), the Fondazione della Cassa di Risparmio del Veneto (2010–2013), and Intesa Sanpaolo (2013–2019).

== See also ==
- 2019 Italian local elections
- List of mayors of Rovigo

Political offices
| Preceded by Massimo Bergamin | Mayor of Rovigo; 2019-2024 | Succeeded by Valeria Cittadin |
