= Alessandro Cattaneo =

Italian politician (born 1979)

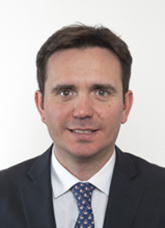

Member of the Chamber of Deputies
- Incumbent
- Assumed office 23 March 2018

Mayor of Pavia
- In office 8 June 2009 – 9 June 2014
- Preceded by: Piera Capitelli
- Succeeded by: Massimo Depaoli

Personal details
- Born: 12 June 1979 (age 47) Rho, Lombardy, Italy
- Party: FI (2001-2009); PdL (2009-2013); FI (since 2013)
- Education: University of Pavia
- Profession: engineer

Alessandro Cattaneo (born 12 June 1979 in Rho) is an Italian politician. He is a member of the centre-right party Forza Italia and served as Mayor of Pavia from June 2009 to May 2014.

Cattaneo has been elected for the Chamber of Deputies at the 2018 Italian general election.

== See also ==
- 2009 Italian local elections
- 2018 Italian general election
- List of mayors of Pavia

Political offices
| Preceded by Piera Capitelli | Mayor of Pavia; 2009–2014 | Succeeded by Massimo Depaoli |
