= Ennio Baiardi =

Italian politician (1928–2014)

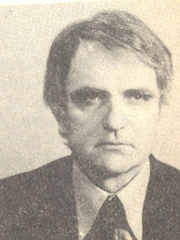
Ennio Baiardi

Ennio Baiardi (6 May 1928 – 16 October 2014) was an Italian politician who served as Mayor of Vercelli (1975–1983) and as Senator for two legislatures (1983–1987, 1987–1992).
