= Fabrizio Fracassi =

Italian politician (born 1957)

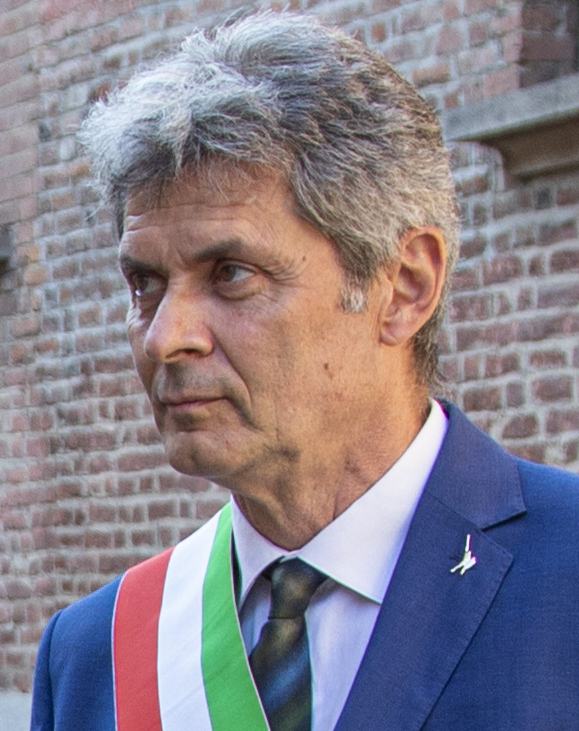

Mayor of Pavia
- In office 30 May 2019 – 11 June 2024
- Preceded by: Massimo Depaoli
- Succeeded by: Michele Lissia

Personal details
- Born: 12 September 1957 (age 68) Pavia, Lombardy, Italy
- Party: Lega Nord
- Profession: employee

Mario Fabrizio Fracassi (born 12 September 1957, in Pavia) is an Italian politician.

He is a member of Lega Nord and he served as member of the Regional Council of Lombardy from 1995 to 2000. He was elected Mayor of Pavia at the 2019 Italian local elections and took office on 30 May 2019.

== Biography ==
A certified surveyor, he joined the Lega Nord in 1990. In 1993, he was elected for the first time as a city councilor for the Northern League in the municipality of Pavia, where he also served as vice-chair of the Culture and Education Committee. From 1995 to 2000, he also served as a regional councilor for the Lombardy Region, initially on the Committee for Economic Development and later on the Committee for Culture and Tourism. In 2000, he was re-elected as a city councilor in Pavia for his party. In 2009, he was appointed councilor for urban planning by Mayor Alessandro Cattaneo of the The People of Freedom party.

In 2019, he was nominated as a mayoral candidate for Pavia by the center-right coalition (Lega, FI, FdI, and two civic lists), after the city of Pavia was placed under special administration following the resignation of the outgoing mayor, Massimo Depaoli of the center-left. In the local elections held on May 26, Fracassi won in the first round with 53.04% of the vote, while his main challenger, center-left candidate Ilaria Cristiani, received 30.93%. He is the second League member to win the mayoral seat at Palazzo Mezzabarba after Rodolfo Jannaccone Pazzi, who served as mayor from 1993 to 1995.

In the 2024 municipal elections, he was not nominated for a second term by his coalition, which instead chose Alessandro Cantoni—formerly the education councilor in the Fracassi administration—who lost the election in the first round to the center-left candidate Michele Lissia.

== See also ==
- 2019 Italian local elections
- List of mayors of Pavia

Political offices
Preceded by Massimo Depaoli	Mayor of Pavia; 2019-2024	Succeeded by Michele Lissia
