= Roberto Balzani =

Italian politician

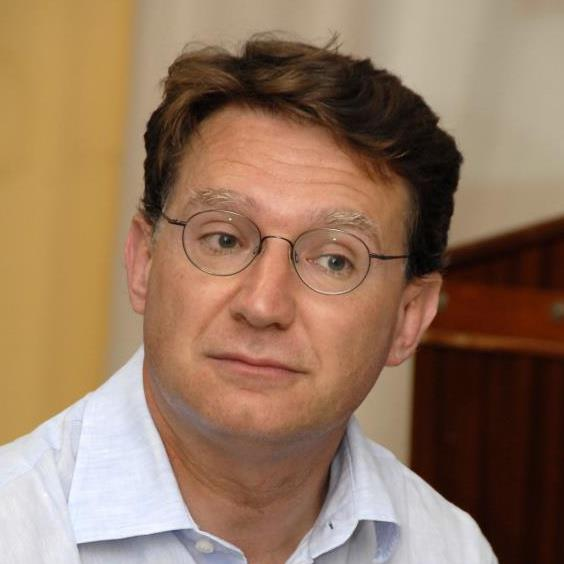

Mayor of Forlì
- In office 23 June 2009 – 28 May 2014
- Preceded by: Nadia Masini
- Succeeded by: Davide Drei

Personal details
- Born: 21 August 1961 (age 65) Forlì, Italy
- Party: Democratic Party
- Education: University of Florence
- Profession: Professor

Roberto Balzani (born 21 August 1961) is an Italian historian, professor and politician.

He is professor of contemporary history at the University of Bologna. His works mainly focus on the Italian Risorgimento and history of Italy in the 19th century.

Balzani is a member of the Democratic Party and served as Mayor of Forlì from June 2009 to May 2014.

== See also ==
- 2009 Italian local elections
- List of mayors of Forlì

Political offices
Preceded by Nadia Masini	Mayor of Forlì; 2009–2014	Succeeded by Davide Drei
