= Davide Drei =

Italian politician

Mayor of Forlì
- In office 28 May 2014 – 11 June 2019
- Preceded by: Roberto Balzani
- Succeeded by: Gian Luca Zattini

President of the Province of Forlì-Cesena
- In office 13 October 2014 – 31 October 2018
- Preceded by: Massimo Bulbi
- Succeeded by: Gabriele Antonio Fratto

Personal details
- Born: 22 January 1965 (age 61) Forlì, Italy
- Party: Democratic Party
- Education: University of Bologna
- Profession: employee

Davide Drei (born 22 January 1965) is an Italian politician.

He is a member of the Democratic Party and he was elected mayor of Forlì on 25 May 2014 and took office on 28 May. His term as mayor ended on 11 June 2019.

Drei served as president of the Province of Forlì-Cesena from 2014 to 2018.

== Biography ==
After earning a degree in geological sciences from the University of Bologna in 1990, he held various positions within the municipal administration.

He has been mayor of the city of Forlì since 2014, succeeding Roberto Balzani, who was elected as a member of the Democratic Party (Italy). From October 13, 2014, to October 30, 2018, he also served as president of the province of Forlì-Cesena.

In 2019, he decided not to run for a second term.

== See also ==
- 2014 Italian local elections
- List of mayors of Forlì

Political offices
Preceded by Roberto Balzani	Mayor of Forlì; 2014–2019	Succeeded by Gian Luca Zattini
Preceded by Massimo Bulbi	President of the Province of Forlì-Cesena; 2014–2018	Succeeded by Gabriele Antonio Fratto
