= Andrea Romizi =

Italian politician and mayor (born 1979)

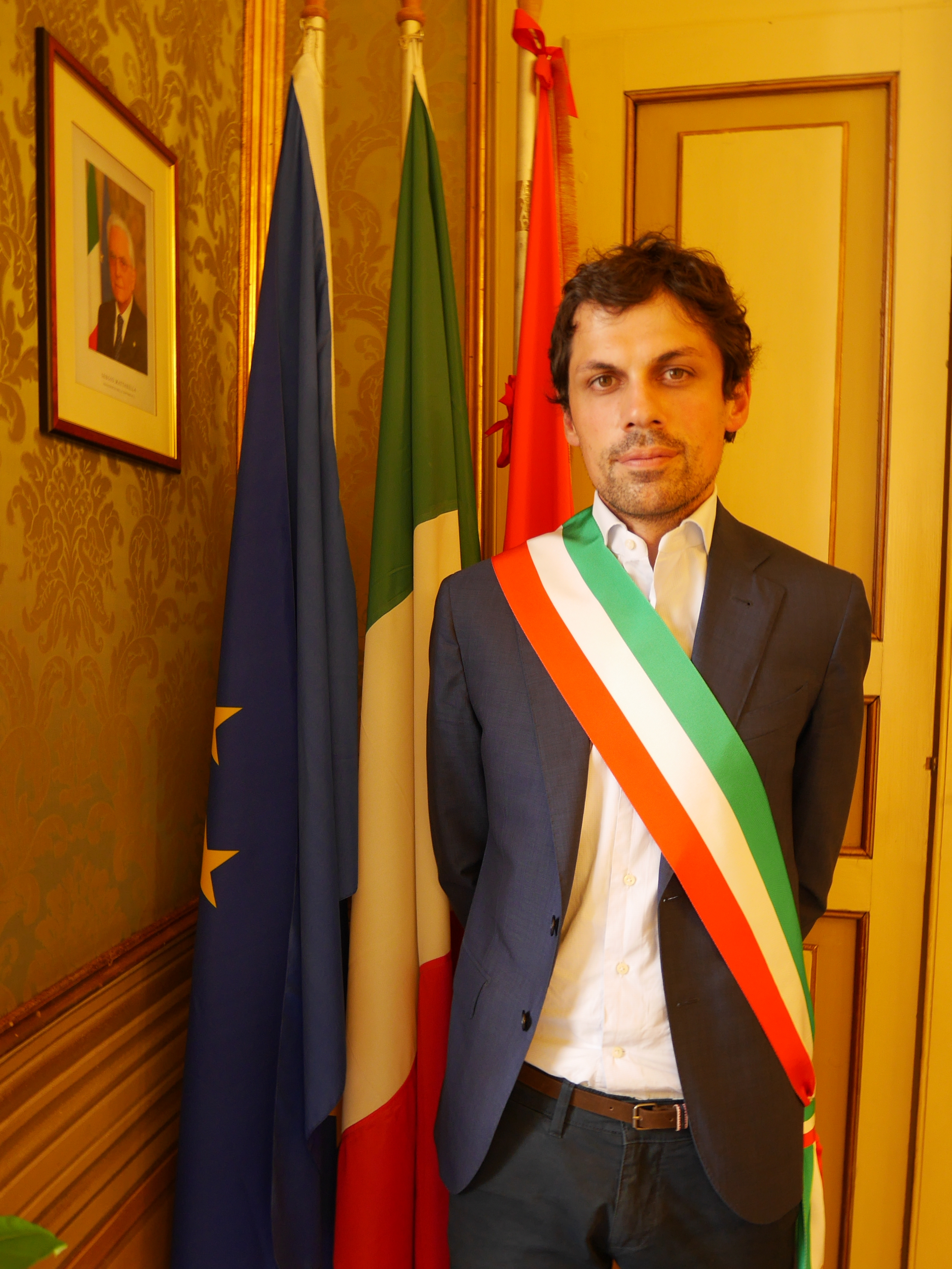

Member of the Legislative Assembly of Umbria
- Incumbent
- Assumed office 17 November 2024

Mayor of Perugia
- In office 11 June 2014 – 25 June 2024
- Preceded by: Wladimiro Boccali
- Succeeded by: Vittoria Ferdinandi

Personal details
- Born: 9 February 1979 (age 47) Assisi, Italy
- Party: Forza Italia
- Education: University of Perugia
- Profession: Lawyer

Andrea Romizi (born 9 February 1979) is an Italian politician serving as a member of the Legislative Assembly of Umbria since 2024. He was mayor of Perugia from 2014 to 2024.

== Life and career ==
After graduating in Law at the University of Perugia and becoming a lawyer, Romizi began working at the legal office led by Fiammetta Modena, member of The People of Freedom and centre-right candidate at the 2010 Umbrian regional election: in 2009, Romizi is elected to the city council of Perugia.

At the 2014 Italian local elections, Romizi became the centre-right candidate for the office of Mayor of Perugia: after ranking second at the first round, Romizi won the second round, defeating the incumbent Mayor Wladimiro Boccali. Romizi is the first centre-right Mayor of Perugia since World War II.

In December 2018, Romizi announced his intention to run for a second mayoral term at the 2019 local elections. On May 26, 2019 he was confirmed mayor in the first round with 59.8% of the vote, beating center-left Giuliano Giubilei. In December 2019, he was appointed by Silvio Berlusconi as the regional coordinator of Forza Italia, in place of Catia Polidori.

In 2024, he was elected to the Legislative Assembly of Umbria.
