= Gian Luca Zattini =

Italian politician

Mayor of Forlì
- Incumbent
- Assumed office 11 June 2019
- Preceded by: Davide Drei

Mayor of Meldola
- In office 8 June 2009 – 27 May 2019
- Preceded by: Loris Venturi
- Succeeded by: Roberto Cavallucci

Personal details
- Born: 12 April 1955 (age 71) Meldola, Province of Forlì-Cesena, Italy
- Party: DC (1980-1994); Independent (since 1994)
- Education: University of Bologna
- Profession: Dentist

Gian Luca Zattini (born 12 April 1955) is an Italian politician.

Zattini studied as MD and works as dentist; he was a member of the Christian Democracy (1980–1994) and served as member of municipal council (from 1975) and mayor of Meldola for two terms from 2009 to 2019.

He was elected Mayor of Forlì at the 2019 local elections with the civic list Forlì cambia (Forlì changes), supported by the League, The People of the Family and a centre-right coalition. Zattini won the centre-left coalition that had administered the city since 49 years. He took office on 11 June 2019.

In March 2020, he authorized the municipal police to use pilotless aircraft for monitoring citizens and for crime prevention. It has been one of the first Italian cases of use of drones at the service of a civil authority.

Political offices
| Preceded by Davide Drei | Mayor of Forlì since 2019 | Succeeded by |
