= Teatro Diego Fabbri =

Coordinates: 44°13′16″N 12°02′21″E

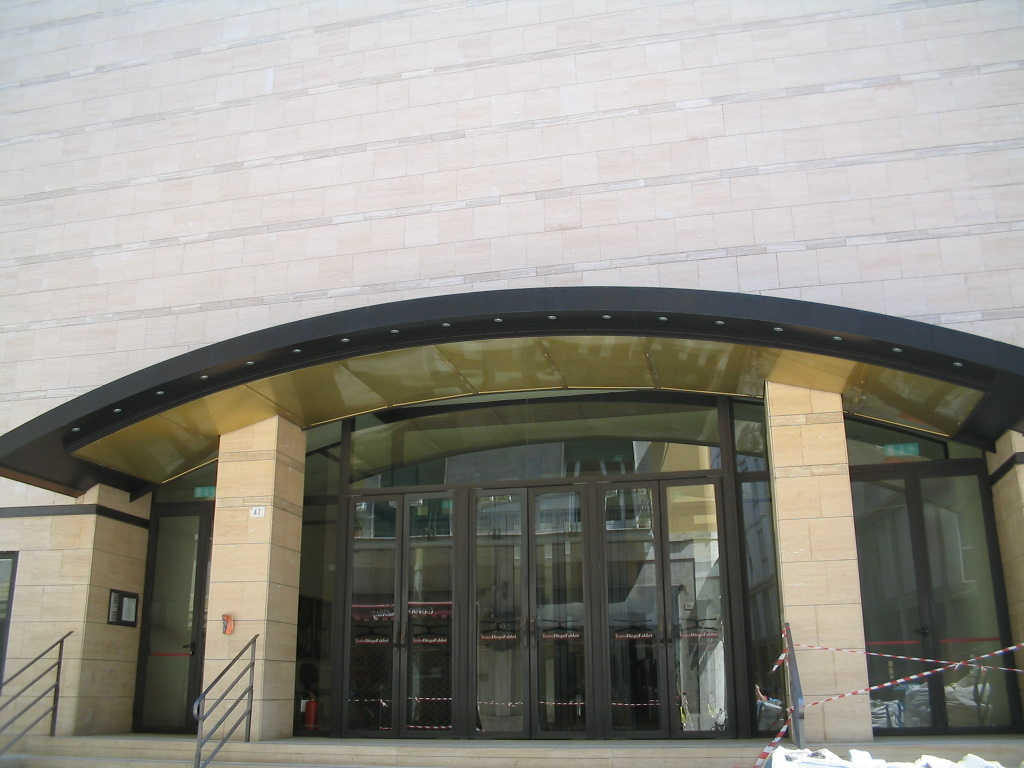
- Main entrance
- Interactive map of Teatro Diego Fabbri
- Address: Forlì

Website
- www.teatrodiegofabbri.it

The Teatro Diego Fabbri (Diego Fabbri Theatre) is a theatre in Forlì, Emilia-Romagna, northern Italy. It was opened in September 2000 and is managed by the municipality of Forlì.

It is provided with 550 seats in the arena and 160 in the galleries, a foyer with 100 seats and two rehearsal halls.
