= Andrea Corsaro =

Italian politician

Mayor of Vercelli
- In office 12 June 2019 – 26 June 2024
- Preceded by: Maura Forte
- Succeeded by: Roberto Scheda
- In office 28 June 2004 – 11 June 2014
- Preceded by: Gabriele Bagnasco
- Succeeded by: Maura Forte

Personal details
- Born: 14 August 1958 (age 68) Vercelli, Piedmont, Italy
- Party: Independent (until 2009; since 2024)
- Other political affiliations: PdL (2009-2013); Forza Italia (2013-2024)
- Education: University of Turin
- Profession: Lawyer

Andrea Corsaro (born 14 August 1958) is an Italian politician.

== Biography ==
He ran for Mayor of Vercelli at the 2004 local elections, supported by a centre-right coalition. He won and took office on 28 June 2004. Corsaro joined The People of Freedom in 2009 and was elected for a second term at the 2009 local elections.

Corsaro ran again for Mayor of Vercelli in 2019 and he won at the second round against the outgoing mayor Maura Forte. He took office on 12 June 2019.

== See also ==
- 2004 Italian local elections
- 2009 Italian local elections
- 2019 Italian local elections
- List of mayors of Vercelli

Political offices
Preceded by Gabriele Bagnasco	Mayor of Vercelli; 2004–2014	Succeeded by Maura Forte
Preceded by Maura Forte	Mayor of Vercelli; 2019–2024	Succeeded by Roberto Scheda
