= Politics of Emilia-Romagna =

The politics of Emilia-Romagna, a region of Italy, takes place in the framework of an "anomalous presidential" representative democracy or prime-ministerial system with an executive presidency, whereby the President of Regional Government is the head of government, and of a pluriform multi-party system. Executive power is exercised by the Regional Government. Legislative power is vested in both the government and the Legislative Assembly.

The region has long been a stronghold of the Italian Communist Party and its successors, from the Democratic Party of the Left to the present-day Democratic Party, and is part of the so-called "Red belt", along with Tuscany, Marche and Umbria.

== Executive branch ==
The Regional Government (Giunta Regionale) is presided by the President of the Region (Presidente della Regione), who is elected for a five-year term, and is composed by the President, the Ministers (Assessori), who are currently 12, including a vice president and one Under-Secretary for in President's office.

=== List of presidents ===
| N. | Portrait | President | Term of office | | Tenure (Years and days) | Party | Composition | Legislature |
|---|---|---|---|---|---|---|---|---|
| 1 | | Guido Fanti (1925–2012) | 28 July 1970 | 22 July 1975 | 5 years, 298 days | Italian Communist Party | PCI–PSIUP | I (1970) |
| 1 | | Guido Fanti (1925–2012) | 22 July 1975 | 21 May 1976 | 5 years, 298 days | Italian Communist Party | PCI | II (1975) |
| 2 | | Sergio Cavina (1929–1977) | 21 May 1976 | 22 December 1977 † | 1 year, 215 days | Italian Communist Party | PCI–PSI | II (1975) |
| 3 | | Lanfranco Turci (1940–) | 7 January 1978 | 25 July 1980 | 9 years, 127 days | Italian Communist Party | PCI–PSI | II (1975) |
| 3 | | Lanfranco Turci (1940–) | 25 July 1980 | 16 July 1985 | 9 years, 127 days | Italian Communist Party | PCI–PDUP | III (1980) |
| 3 | | Lanfranco Turci (1940–) | 16 July 1985 | 28 April 1987 | 9 years, 127 days | Italian Communist Party | PCI | IV (1985) |
| 4 | | Luciano Guerzoni (1935–2017) | 28 April 1987 | 24 June 1990 | 3 years, 57 days | Italian Communist Party | PCI | IV (1985) |
| 5 | | Enrico Boselli (1957–) | 24 June 1990 | 5 July 1993 | 3 years, 11 days | Italian Socialist Party | PCI/PDS–PSI–PRI–PSDI | V (1990) |
| 6 | | Pier Luigi Bersani (1951–) | 5 July 1993 | 9 June 1995 | 2 years, 328 days | Democratic Party of the Left | PDS–PSI–PRI–PSDI | V (1990) |
| 6 | | Pier Luigi Bersani (1951–) | 9 June 1995 | 28 May 1996 | 2 years, 328 days | Democratic Party of the Left | PDS–PPI–PdD–FdV | VI (1995) |
| 7 | | Antonio La Forgia (1944–2022) | 5 June 1996 | 22 February 1999 | 2 years, 262 days | Democratic Party of the Left | PDS–PPI–PdD–FdV | VI (1995) |
| 8 | | Vasco Errani (1955–) | 3 March 1999 | 16 April 2000 | 15 years, 127 days | Democrats of the Left | DS–PPI–PdD–FdV | VI (1995) |
| 8 | | Vasco Errani (1955–) | 16 April 2000 | 5 April 2005 | 15 years, 127 days | Democrats of the Left | DS–PRC–Dem–FdV–PdCI | VII (2000) |
| 8 | | Vasco Errani (1955–) | 5 April 2005 | 29 March 2010 | 15 years, 127 days | Democratic Party | PD–PRC–IdV–FdV–PdCI | VIII (2005) |
| 8 | | Vasco Errani (1955–) | 29 March 2010 | 8 July 2014 | 15 years, 127 days | Democratic Party | PD–SEL–PdCI–IdV | IX (2010) |
| – | | Simonetta Saliera (1956– ) | 8 July 2014 | 24 November 2014 | 139 days | Democratic Party | PD–SEL–PdCI–IdV | IX (2010) |
| 9 | | Stefano Bonaccini (1967–) | 24 November 2014 | 28 February 2020 | 9 years, 231 days | Democratic Party | PD–SEL | X (2014) |
| 9 | | Stefano Bonaccini (1967–) | 28 February 2020 | 12 July 2024 | 9 years, 231 days | Democratic Party | PD–SI–IV–EV | XI (2020) |
| – | | Irene Priolo (1974– ) | 12 July 2024 | 13 December 2024 | 154 days | Democratic Party | PD–SI–IV–EV | XI (2020) |
| 10 | | Michele De Pascale (1985– ) | 13 December 2024 | Incumbent | 1 year, 282 days | Democratic Party | PD–AVS–M5S | XII (2024) |

== Legislative branch ==
The Legislative Assembly of Emilia-Romagna (Assemblea Legislativa dell'Emilia-Romagna) is composed of 50 members. 40 councillors are elected in provincial constituencies by proportional representation using the largest remainder method with a Droop quota and open lists, while 10 councillors (elected in bloc) come from a "regional list", including the President-elect. One seat is reserved for the candidate who comes second. If a coalition wins more than 50% of the total seats in the council with PR, only 5 candidates from the regional list will be chosen and the number of those elected in provincial constituencies will be 45. If the winning coalition receives less than 40% of votes special seats are added to the council to ensure a large majority for the President's coalition.

The council is elected for a five-year term, but, if the President suffers a vote of no confidence, resigns or dies, under the simul stabunt, simul cadent clause introduced in 1999 (literally they will stand together or they will fall together), also the council is dissolved and a snap election is called.

=== Current composition ===
The Assembly is currently composed of the following political groups:

| Party | Seats | Status |
|---|---|---|
| Democratic Party (PD) | 28 / 50 | In government |
| Brothers of Italy (FdI) | 11 / 50 | In opposition |
| Greens and Left Alliance (AVS) | 3 / 50 | In government |
| Civics with De Pascale (Civici) | 2 / 50 | In government |
| Forza Italia (FI) | 2 / 50 | In opposition |
| Civic Network (RC) | 2 / 50 | In opposition |
| League (Lega) | 1 / 50 | In opposition |
| Five Star Movement (M5S) | 1 / 50 | In government |

By coalition:

| Coalition | Seats | Status |
|---|---|---|
| Centre-left coalition | 34 / 50 | Government |
| Centre-right coalition | 16 / 50 | Opposition |

== Local government ==
=== Provinces ===
Emilia-Romagna is divided in nine provinces, which are a traditional form of local administration in the region.

Socialist and communist ideas had an early diffusion in quite all the provinces around World War I. After the Fascist parenthesis, left-wing parties found their strongholds in Emilia-Romagna, also known as the "red region of Italy".

| Province | Inhabitants | President | Party | Election |
|---|---|---|---|---|
| Metropolitan City of Bologna | 1,012,535 | Matteo Lepore (metropolitan mayor) | Democratic Party | 2021 |
| Ferrara (list) | 346,034 | Daniele Garuti | Independent (centre-right) | 2024 |
| Forlì-Cesena (list) | 394,654 | Enzo Lattuca | Democratic Party | 2021 |
| Modena (list) | 702,983 | Fabio Braglia | Democratic Party | 2023 |
| Parma (list) | 451,666 | Alessandro Fadda | Democratic Party | 2024 |
| Piacenza (list) | 286,731 | Monica Patelli | Independent (Democratic Party) | 2022 |
| Ravenna (list) | 390,433 | Valentina Palli | Democratic Party | 2025 |
| Reggio Emilia (list) | 532,102 | Giorgio Zanni | Democratic Party | 2018 |
| Rimini (list) | 338,035 | Jamil Sadegholvaad | Democratic Party | 2022 |

=== Municipalities ===
Emilia-Romagna is also divided in 331 comuni (municipalities), which have even more history, having been established in the Middle Ages when they were the main places of government. 17 comuni (9 provincial capitals) have more than 35,000 inhabitants.

Provincial capitals

| Municipality | Inhabitants | Mayor | Party | Election |
|---|---|---|---|---|
| Bologna (list) | 390,198 | Matteo Lepore | Democratic Party | 2020 |
| Ferrara (list) | 132,125 | Alan Fabbri | Lega Emilia | 2019 |
| Forlì (list) | 117,892 | Gian Luca Zattini | Independent (Lega Emilia) | 2019 |
| Modena (list) | 185,045 | Massimo Mezzetti | Democratic Party | 2024 |
| Parma (list) | 197,132 | Michele Guerra | Italia in Comune | 2022 |
| Piacenza (list) | 103,398 | Katia Tarasconi | Democratic Party | 2022 |
| Ravenna (list) | 158,503 | Michele De Pascale | Democratic Party | 2021 |
| Reggio Emilia (list) | 172,196 | Marco Massari | Democratic Party | 2024 |
| Rimini (list) | 150,013 | Jamil Sadegholvaad | Democratic Party | 2021 |

Other municipalities

Cities with more than 35,000 inhabitants.

| Municipality | Inhabitants | Mayor | Party | Election |
|---|---|---|---|---|
| Cesena | 97,216 | Enzo Lattuca | Democratic Party | 2022 |
| Carpi | 71,281 | Riccardo Righi | Democratic Party | 2024 |
| Imola | 69,924 | Marco Panieri | Democratic Party | 2020 |
| Faenza | 58,863 | Massimo Isola | Democratic Party | 2020 |
| Sassuolo | 40,863 | Matteo Mesini | Democratic Party | 2024 |
| Casalecchio di Reno | 36,509 | Matteo Ruggeri | Democratic Party | 2024 |
| Cento | 35,485 | Edoardo Accorsi | Democratic Party | 2021 |
| Riccione | 35,044 | Daniela Angelini | Democratic Party | 2022 |

== Parties and elections ==
=== Latest regional election ===
In the latest regional election, which took place on 17–18 November 2024, Michele De Pascale (Democratic Party) was elected President of Emilia-Romagna by a landslide.

17–18 November 2024 Emilia-Romagna regional election results
| Candidates | Votes | % | Seats | Parties | Votes | % | Seats |
|---|---|---|---|---|---|---|---|
| Michele De Pascale | 922,150 | 56.77 | 1 | Democratic Party | 641,704 | 42.94 | 27 |
| Michele De Pascale | 922,150 | 56.77 | 1 | Greens and Left Alliance | 79,236 | 5.30 | 3 |
| Michele De Pascale | 922,150 | 56.77 | 1 | Civics with De Pascale for President | 57,400 | 3.84 | 2 |
| Michele De Pascale | 922,150 | 56.77 | 1 | Five Star Movement | 53,075 | 3.55 | 1 |
| Michele De Pascale | 922,150 | 56.77 | 1 | Future Emilia-Romagna | 25,729 | 1.72 | – |
| Michele De Pascale | 922,150 | 56.77 | 1 | Total | 857,144 | 57.36 | 33 |
| Elena Ugolini | 650,935 | 40.07 | 1 | Brothers of Italy | 354,833 | 23.74 | 11 |
| Elena Ugolini | 650,935 | 40.07 | 1 | Forza Italia | 83,998 | 5.62 | 2 |
| Elena Ugolini | 650,935 | 40.07 | 1 | League | 78,734 | 5.27 | 1 |
| Elena Ugolini | 650,935 | 40.07 | 1 | Civic Network – Ugolini for President | 76,988 | 5.15 | 1 |
| Elena Ugolini | 650,935 | 40.07 | 1 | Total | 594,553 | 39.79 | 15 |
| Federico Serra | 31,483 | 1.94 | – | Emilia-Romagna for Peace, Environment and Labour | 27,337 | 1.83 | – |
| Luca Teodori | 19,831 | 1.22 | – | Loyalty Coherence Truth | 15,341 | 1.03 | – |
| Total candidates | 1,624,399 | 100.00 | 2 | Total parties | 1,494,375 | 100.00 | 48 |
| Blank and invalid votes | 35,643 | | | | | | |
| Registered voters/turnout | 3,576,427 | 46.42 | | | | | |
Source: Ministry of the Interior – Election in Emilia-Romagna
