= Elections in Emilia-Romagna =

This page gathers the results of elections in Emilia-Romagna.

== Regional elections ==
=== Latest regional election ===
In the latest regional election, which took place on 17–18 November 2024, Michele De Pascale (Democratic Party) was elected President of Emilia-Romagna by a landslide.

17–18 November 2024 Emilia-Romagna regional election results
| Candidates | Votes | % | Seats | Parties | Votes | % | Seats |
|---|---|---|---|---|---|---|---|
| Michele De Pascale | 922,150 | 56.77 | 1 | Democratic Party | 641,704 | 42.94 | 27 |
| Michele De Pascale | 922,150 | 56.77 | 1 | Greens and Left Alliance | 79,236 | 5.30 | 3 |
| Michele De Pascale | 922,150 | 56.77 | 1 | Civics with De Pascale for President | 57,400 | 3.84 | 2 |
| Michele De Pascale | 922,150 | 56.77 | 1 | Five Star Movement | 53,075 | 3.55 | 1 |
| Michele De Pascale | 922,150 | 56.77 | 1 | Future Emilia-Romagna | 25,729 | 1.72 | – |
| Michele De Pascale | 922,150 | 56.77 | 1 | Total | 857,144 | 57.36 | 33 |
| Elena Ugolini | 650,935 | 40.07 | 1 | Brothers of Italy | 354,833 | 23.74 | 11 |
| Elena Ugolini | 650,935 | 40.07 | 1 | Forza Italia | 83,998 | 5.62 | 2 |
| Elena Ugolini | 650,935 | 40.07 | 1 | League | 78,734 | 5.27 | 1 |
| Elena Ugolini | 650,935 | 40.07 | 1 | Civic Network – Ugolini for President | 76,988 | 5.15 | 1 |
| Elena Ugolini | 650,935 | 40.07 | 1 | Total | 594,553 | 39.79 | 15 |
| Federico Serra | 31,483 | 1.94 | – | Emilia-Romagna for Peace, Environment and Labour | 27,337 | 1.83 | – |
| Luca Teodori | 19,831 | 1.22 | – | Loyalty Coherence Truth | 15,341 | 1.03 | – |
| Total candidates | 1,624,399 | 100.00 | 2 | Total parties | 1,494,375 | 100.00 | 48 |
| Blank and invalid votes | 35,643 | | | | | | |
| Registered voters/turnout | 3,576,427 | 46.42 | | | | | |
Source: Ministry of the Interior – Election in Emilia-Romagna

=== List of previous regional elections ===
- 1970 Emilia-Romagna regional election
- 1975 Emilia-Romagna regional election
- 1980 Emilia-Romagna regional election
- 1985 Emilia-Romagna regional election
- 1990 Emilia-Romagna regional election
- 1995 Emilia-Romagna regional election
- 2000 Emilia-Romagna regional election
- 2005 Emilia-Romagna regional election
- 2010 Emilia-Romagna regional election
- 2014 Emilia-Romagna regional election
- 2020 Emilia-Romagna regional election
