= List of presidents of Emilia-Romagna =

This is the list of presidents of Emilia–Romagna since 1970.

== List of presidents ==
N.	Portrait	President	Term of office		Tenure (Years and days)	Party	Composition	Legislature
1		Guido Fanti (1925–2012)	28 July 1970	22 July 1975	5 years, 298 days	Italian Communist Party	PCI–PSIUP	I (1970)
1		Guido Fanti (1925–2012)	22 July 1975	21 May 1976	5 years, 298 days	Italian Communist Party	PCI	II (1975)
2		Sergio Cavina (1929–1977)	21 May 1976	22 December 1977 †	1 year, 215 days	Italian Communist Party	PCI–PSI	II (1975)
3		Lanfranco Turci (1940–)	7 January 1978	25 July 1980	9 years, 127 days	Italian Communist Party	PCI–PSI	II (1975)
3		Lanfranco Turci (1940–)	25 July 1980	16 July 1985	9 years, 127 days	Italian Communist Party	PCI–PDUP	III (1980)
3		Lanfranco Turci (1940–)	16 July 1985	28 April 1987	9 years, 127 days	Italian Communist Party	PCI	IV (1985)
4		Luciano Guerzoni (1935–2017)	28 April 1987	24 June 1990	3 years, 57 days	Italian Communist Party	PCI	IV (1985)
5		Enrico Boselli (1957–)	24 June 1990	5 July 1993	3 years, 11 days	Italian Socialist Party	PCI/PDS–PSI–PRI–PSDI	V (1990)
6		Pier Luigi Bersani (1951–)	5 July 1993	9 June 1995	2 years, 328 days	Democratic Party of the Left	PDS–PSI–PRI–PSDI	V (1990)
6		Pier Luigi Bersani (1951–)	9 June 1995	28 May 1996	2 years, 328 days	Democratic Party of the Left	PDS–PPI–PdD–FdV	VI (1995)
7		Antonio La Forgia (1944–2022)	5 June 1996	22 February 1999	2 years, 262 days	Democratic Party of the Left	PDS–PPI–PdD–FdV	VI (1995)
8		Vasco Errani (1955–)	3 March 1999	16 April 2000	15 years, 127 days	Democrats of the Left	DS–PPI–PdD–FdV	VI (1995)
8		Vasco Errani (1955–)	16 April 2000	5 April 2005	15 years, 127 days	Democrats of the Left	DS–PRC–Dem–FdV–PdCI	VII (2000)
8		Vasco Errani (1955–)	5 April 2005	29 March 2010	15 years, 127 days	Democratic Party	PD–PRC–IdV–FdV–PdCI	VIII (2005)
8		Vasco Errani (1955–)	29 March 2010	8 July 2014	15 years, 127 days	Democratic Party	PD–SEL–PdCI–IdV	IX (2010)
–		Simonetta Saliera (1956– )	8 July 2014	24 November 2014	139 days	Democratic Party	PD–SEL–PdCI–IdV	IX (2010)
9		Stefano Bonaccini (1967–)	24 November 2014	28 February 2020	9 years, 231 days	Democratic Party	PD–SEL	X (2014)
9		Stefano Bonaccini (1967–)	28 February 2020	12 July 2024	9 years, 231 days	Democratic Party	PD–SI–IV–EV	XI (2020)
–		Irene Priolo (1974– )	12 July 2024	13 December 2024	154 days	Democratic Party	PD–SI–IV–EV	XI (2020)
10		Michele De Pascale (1985– )	13 December 2024	Incumbent	1 year, 252 days	Democratic Party	PD–AVS–M5S	XII (2024)

== Presidents by time in office ==
Rank	President	Political party	Total time in office	Terms
1	Vasco Errani	DS/PD	15 years, 127 days	4
2	Stefano Bonaccini	PD	9 years, 231 days	2
3	Lanfranco Turci	PCI	9 years, 127 days	3
4	Guido Fanti	PCI	5 years, 298 days	2
5	Luciano Guerzoni	PCI	3 years, 57 days	1
6	Enrico Boselli	PSI	3 years, 11 days	1
7	Pier Luigi Bersani	PDS	2 years, 328 days	2
8	Antonio La Forgia	PDS	2 years, 262 days	1
9	Michele De Pascale	PD	1 year, 252 days	1
10	Sergio Cavina	PCI	1 year, 215 days	1
