= Democratic Party of Emilia-Romagna =

Regional branch of the Democratic Party (Italy)

Democratic Party of Emilia-Romagna Partito Democratico Emilia-Romagna
- Secretary: Stefano Bonaccini
- Founded: 14 October 2007
- Merger of: Democrats of the Left; The Daisy minor parties
- Headquarters: Bologna
- Youth wing: Young Democrats
- Membership (2013): 100,000
- Ideology: Social democracy Democratic socialism Christian left Progressivism
- National affiliation: Democratic Party
- Colors: Red
- Legislative Assembly of Emilia-Romagna: 30 / 50

Website
- pder.it

The Democratic Party of Emilia-Romagna (Italian: Partito Democratico Emilia-Romagna, PDER) is a social-democratic political party in Italy, acting as the regional faction of the Democratic Party. The PD is the largest party by representation in Emilia-Romagna and it led a coalition formed by Left Ecology Freedom and Italy of Values which had a supermajority in the regional Legislative Assembly. The party's leader was Vasco Errani, who was President of Emilia-Romagna until 14 July 2014.

The Democratic Party is the heir of the Italian Communist Party which governed Emilia-Romagna for almost sixty years; in fact, Emilia-Romagna is considered by public opinion a "red region", or rather a region which has been governed only by centre-left or left-wing Presidents, and where social-democratic, socialist and communist parties gained the majority of votes in every elections.

Other than Vasco Errani prominent members of the PDER include Virginio Merola, Graziano Delrio and Stefano Bonaccini.

== Popular support ==
The electoral results of the Democratic Party in the Emilia-Romagna are shown in the table below. As PD was founded in 2007, the electoral results from 1994 to 2006 refer to the combined result of the two main percursor parties, the Democrats of the Left and Democracy is Freedom – The Daisy (and its precursors, 1994–2001), or to the joint-list called The Olive Tree.

Region	1994 general	1995 regional	1996 general	1999 European	2000 regional	2001 general	2004 European	2005 regional	2006 general	2008 general	2009 European	2010 regional	2013 general	2014 European	2014 regional	2018 general
Emilia-Romagna	51.4	52.3	47.5	43.7	43.9	44.3	43.0	48.1	44.8	45.7	38.6	40.6	37.0	52.5	44.5	26.4

== Electoral results ==
Chamber of Deputies
Election year	# of overall votes	% of overall vote	# of overall seats won	+/–
2008	1,282,534 (#1)	45.70	20 / 45	–
2008	Major party in coalition led by Walter Veltroni.			
2013	989,660 (#1)	37.04	28 / 45	▲8
2013	Major party in Italy. Common Good led by Pier Luigi Bersani.			
2018	668,837 (#2)	26.38	18 / 45	▼10
2018	Major party in coalition led by Matteo Renzi.			

Senate of the Republic
Election year	# of overall votes	% of overall vote	# of overall seats won	+/–
2008	1,193,939 (#1)	45.40	12 / 22	–
2008	Major party in coalition led by Walter Veltroni.			
2013	977,617 (#1)	39.16	13 / 22	▲1
2013	Major party in Italy. Common Good led by Pier Luigi Bersani.			
2018	621,521 (#2)	26.33	8 / 22	▼5
2018	Major party in coalition led by Matteo Renzi.			

Legislative Assembly
Election year	# of overall votes	% of overall vote	# of overall seats won	+/–	Leader
2010	857,613 (#1)	40.6	28 / 50	–	Vasco Errani
2010	Senior party in the government coalition led by Vasco Errani.				
2014	535,109 (#1)	44.5	30 / 50	▲2	Stefano Bonaccini
2014	Senior party in the government coalition led by Stefano Bonaccini.				
