= Legislative Assembly of Emilia-Romagna =

Legislative organ of Emilia-Romagna, Italy

Legislative Assembly of Emilia-Romagna Assemblea legislativa dell'Emilia-Romagna
- 12th legislature
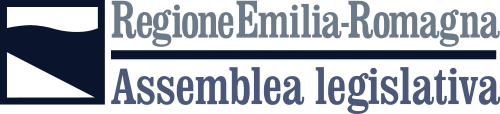

Type
- Type: Regional council Unicameral
- Established: 13 July 1970

Leadership
- President: Maurizio Fabbri, PD since 13 December 2024

Structure
- Seats: 50
- Political groups: Government (34): PD (28); AVS (3); Civici (2); M5S (1); Opposition (16): FdI (11); FI (2); RC (2); Lega (1)
- Length of term: 5 years

Elections
- Voting system: Party-list semi-proportional representation with majority bonus D'Hondt method
- Last election: 17 November 2024
- Next election: No later than 18 November 2029

Meeting place
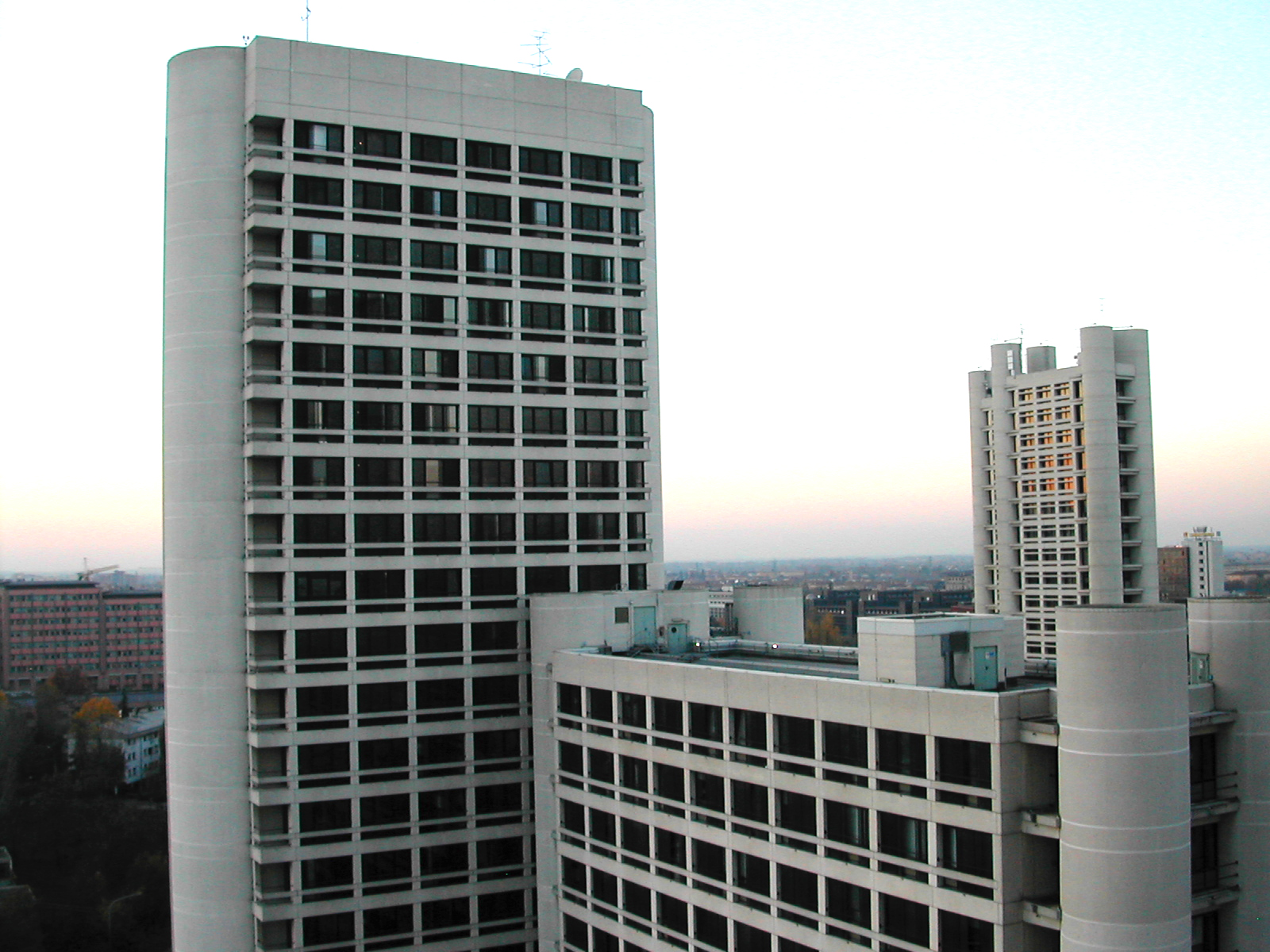
- Fiera District, Bologna

Website
- www.assemblea.emr.it

The Legislative Assembly of Emilia-Romagna (Italian: Assemblea Legislativa dell'Emilia-Romagna) is the regional council, hence the regional legislative authority, of Emilia-Romagna.

It was first elected in 1970, when the ordinary Regions were instituted, on the basis of the Constitution of Italy of 1948.

== Composition ==
The Legislative Assembly of Emilia-Romagna is composed of 50 members, of which 48 are elected in provincial constituencies with proportional representation, one is for the candidate for President who comes second, who usually becomes the leader of the opposition in the Council, and one is for the elected president.

The Assembly is elected for a five-year term, but, if the President suffers a vote of no confidence, resigns or dies, under the simul stabunt vel simul cadent clause (introduced in 1999), also the Assembly will be dissolved and there will be a snap election.

=== Political groups (2024–2029) ===
The Assembly is currently composed of the following political groups:

Party	Seats	Status
Democratic Party (PD)	28 / 50	In government
Brothers of Italy (FdI)	11 / 50	In opposition
Greens and Left Alliance (AVS)	3 / 50	In government
Civics with De Pascale (Civici)	2 / 50	In government
Forza Italia (FI)	2 / 50	In opposition
Civic Network (RC)	2 / 50	In opposition
League (Lega)	1 / 50	In opposition
Five Star Movement (M5S)	1 / 50	In government

By coalition:

Coalition	Seats	Status
Centre-left coalition	34 / 50	Government
Centre-right coalition	16 / 50	Opposition

=== Historical composition ===
Election	PCI	PSI	DC	PLI	PRI	PSDI	MSI	Others	Total
7 June 1970	24	3	14	1	2	2	1	3	50
15 June 1975	26	4	13	1	2	2	1	1	50
8 June 1980	26	4	13	1	2	2	1	1	50
12 May 1985	26	4	13	1	2	1	2	1	50
6 May 1990	23	6	13	1	2	1	1	3	50

Election	Majority	Opposition	Council	President of the Region
23 April 1995	Centre-left (The Olive Tree) 34 / 50	Centre-right (Pole for Freedoms) 12 / 50 PRC 3 / 50 Lega Nord 1 / 50		Pierluigi Bersani (1995–1996); Antonio La Forgia (1996–1999); Vasco Errani (1999–2000)
16 April 2000	Centre-left (The Olive Tree) 33 / 50	Centre-right (House of Freedoms) 17 / 50		Vasco Errani (2000–2014)
3 April 2005	Centre-left (The Union) 32 / 50	Centre-right (House of Freedoms) 18 / 50		Vasco Errani (2000–2014)
28 March 2010	Centre-left 32 / 50	Centre-right 15 / 50 M5S 2 / 50 UDC 1 / 50		Vasco Errani (2000–2014)
23 November 2014 (snap election)	Centre-left 32 / 50	Centre-right 12 / 50 M5S 5 / 50 PRC 1 / 50		Stefano Bonaccini (2014–2024)
26 January 2020	Centre-left 29 / 50	Centre-right 19 / 50 M5S 2 / 50		Stefano Bonaccini (2014–2024)
17 November 2024 (snap election)	Centre-left 34 / 50	Centre-right 16 / 50		Michele De Pascale (since 2024)

== Presidents ==
This is a list of the Presidents of the Legislative Assembly (Italian: Presidenti dell'Assemblea Legislativa):

Name	Period		Regional Legislature
Silvano Armaroli (PSI)	13 July 1970	24 July 1975	I (1970)
Silvano Armaroli (PSI)	24 July 1975	22 December 1977	II (1975)
Natalino Guerra (DC)	22 December 1977	21 July 1980	II (1975)
Ottorino Bartolini (PSI)	21 July 1980	18 November 1983	III (1980)
Giovanni Piepoli (PSI)	18 November 1983	17 June 1985	III (1980)
Giovanni Piepoli (PSI)	17 June 1985	24 June 1990	IV (1985)
Luciano Guerzoni (PDS)	24 June 1990	13 January 1992	V (1990)
Federico Castellucci (PDS)	13 January 1992	29 May 1995	V (1990)
Celestina Cerruti (Dem)	29 May 1995	7 June 2000	VI (1995)
Antonio La Forgia (Dem)	7 June 2000	16 May 2005	VII (2000)
Monica Donini (PRC)	16 May 2005	10 May 2010	VIII (2005)
Matteo Richetti (PD)	10 May 2010	16 January 2013	IX (2010)
Palma Costi (PD)	16 January 2013	29 December 2014	IX (2010)
Simonetta Saliera (PD)	29 December 2014	28 February 2020	X (2014)
Emma Petitti (PD)	28 February 2020	13 December 2024	XI (2020)
Maurizio Fabbri (PD)	13 December 2024	incumbent	XII (2024)

== See also ==
- Regional council (Italy)
- Emilia-Romagna
- Politics of Emilia-Romagna
- Politics of Italy
