= 1995 Emilia-Romagna regional election =

← 1990	23 April 1995	2000 →

All 50 seats to the Regional Council of Emilia-Romagna
- Turnout: 88.30% (▼4.68%)
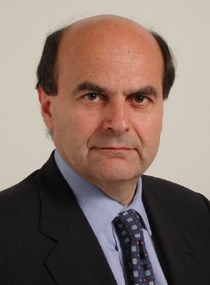

	Majority party	Minority party
Leader	Pier Luigi Bersani	Gianfranco Morra
Party	PDS	FI
Alliance	Centre-left	Centre-right
Seats won	34	12
Popular vote	1,508,241	896,012
Percentage	53.81%	31.97%
- Seat totals by Province. As this is a PR election, seat totals are determined by popular vote in each province
President before election
Pier Luigi Bersani
PDS
President-elect
Pier Luigi Bersani
PDS

The Emilia-Romagna regional election of 1995 took place on 23 April 1995.

Pier Luigi Bersani (Democratic Party of the Left), who had succeeded Enrico Boselli (Socialist Party) in 1994, was elected President of the Region, defeating Gianfranco Morra (Forza Italia) by a landslide.

For the first time the President of the Region was directly elected by the people, although the election was not yet binding and the President-elect could have been replaced during the term. This is precisely what happened in 1996, when Antonio La Forgia replaced Bersani, who had been appointed minister in Prodi I Cabinet, and again in 1999, when La Forgia was replaced by Vasco Errani.

== Electoral system ==
The Legislative Assembly of Emilia-Romagna (Assemblea Legislativa dell'Emilia-Romagna) is composed of 50 members. 40 councillors are elected in provincial constituencies by proportional representation using the largest remainder method with a Droop quota and open lists, while 10 councillors (elected in bloc) come from a "regional list", including the President-elect. One seat is reserved for the candidate who comes second. If a coalition wins more than 50% of the total seats in the Council with PR, only 5 candidates from the regional list will be chosen and the number of those elected in provincial constituencies will be 45. If the winning coalition receives less than 40% of votes special seats are added to the Council to ensure a large majority for the President's coalition.

== Parties and candidates ==
Political party or alliance	Constituent lists	Previous result		Candidate
Political party or alliance	Constituent lists	Votes (%)	Seats	Candidate
Centre-left coalition	Democratic Party of the Left	42.1	23	Pier Luigi Bersani
Centre-left coalition	Populars	23.4	13	Pier Luigi Bersani
Centre-left coalition	Federation of the Greens	4.9	2	Pier Luigi Bersani
Centre-left coalition	Italian Republican Party – Labour Federation	4.8	2	Pier Luigi Bersani
Centre-left coalition	Pact of Democrats	—	—	Pier Luigi Bersani
Centre-right coalition	National Alliance	3.0	1	Gianfranco Morra
Centre-right coalition	Forza Italia	—	—	Gianfranco Morra
Centre-right coalition	Christian Democratic Centre	—	—	Gianfranco Morra
Northern League Emilia-Romagna (LNE+LNR)		2.9	1	Pierluigi Copercini
Pannella List		1.0	–	Carduccio Parizzi
Communist Refoundation Party		—	—	Renato Albertini

== Results ==
23 April 1995 Emilia-Romagna regional election results
Candidates	Votes	%	Seats	Parties	Votes	%	Seats
Pier Luigi Bersani	1,508,241	53.81	10				
Pier Luigi Bersani	1,508,241	53.81	10	Democratic Party of the Left	1,106,929	43.02	20
Pier Luigi Bersani	1,508,241	53.81	10	Populars	144,398	5.61	2
Pier Luigi Bersani	1,508,241	53.81	10	Pact of Democrats	96,042	3.73	1
Pier Luigi Bersani	1,508,241	53.81	10	Federation of the Greens	82,178	3.19	1
Pier Luigi Bersani	1,508,241	53.81	10	Italian Republican Party – Labour Federation	34,802	1.35	–
Pier Luigi Bersani	1,508,241	53.81	10	Total	1,464,349	56.91	24
Gianfranco Morra	896,012	31.97	–				
Gianfranco Morra	896,012	31.97	–	Forza Italia – The People's Pole	467,863	18.18	7
Gianfranco Morra	896,012	31.97	–	National Alliance	264,367	10.27	4
Gianfranco Morra	896,012	31.97	–	Christian Democratic Centre	59,898	2.33	1
Gianfranco Morra	896,012	31.97	–	Total	792,128	30.78	12
Renato Albertini	247,476	8.83	–	Communist Refoundation Party	196,274	7.63	3
Pierluigi Copercini	107,628	3.84	–	Northern League Emilia-Romagna	86,400	3.36	1
Carduccio Parizzi	43,633	1.56	–	Pannella List	33,995	1.32	–
Total candidates	2,802,990	100.00	10	Total parties	2,573,146	100.00	40
Source: Ministry of the Interior – Historical Archive of Elections

Popular vote
PDS	43.02%
FI–PP	18.18%
AN	10.27%
PRC	7.63%
PPI	5.61%
PdD	3.73%
LN	3.36%
FdV	3.19%
CCD	2.33%
Others	2.67%

President
Bersani	53.81%
Morra	31.97%
Albertini	8.83%
Copercini	3.84%
Parizzi	1.56%
