= Gian Luca Galletti =

Italian politician (born 1961)

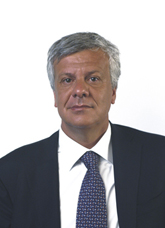

Minister of the Environment
- In office 22 February 2014 – 1 June 2018
- Prime Minister: Matteo Renzi; Paolo Gentiloni
- Preceded by: Andrea Orlando
- Succeeded by: Sergio Costa

Member of the Chamber of Deputies
- In office 28 April 2006 – 14 March 2013
- Constituency: Emilia-Romagna

Personal details
- Born: 15 July 1961 (age 65) Bologna, Italy
- Party: Union of the Centre (2002–2016); Centrists for Europe (2016–present)
- Education: University of Bologna
- Profession: Tax advisor Politician

Gian Luca Galletti (born 15 July 1961) is an Italian politician, member of the Christian democratic Centrists for Europe.

He has been Minister of the Environment since 22 February 2014, serving in the centre-left cabinets of Matteo Renzi and Paolo Gentiloni.

== Biography ==
Gian Luca Galletti was born in Bologna in 1961; he attended the University of Bologna and graduated in Economy and Commerce. In 1969 he started working as tax advisor and auditor.

In 1999 he was elected in the city council of Bologna, as a member of the Christian democratic Union of the Centre; from 1999 to 2004 he served as assessor of budget in the cabinet of Giorgio Guazzaloca, the sole centre-right mayor that ruled Bologna since the Second World War.

In 2005 he was elected in the Legislative Assembly of Emilia-Romagna; in 2006 he was elected for the first time at the Italian Chamber of Deputies, in the centre-right coalition. He was re-elected in 2008.

In 2009, he was a candidate for the presidency of the Bologna Province, gaining 4.6% of votes; while the following year, he ran as UDC candidate to the Presidency of Emilia-Romagna, however, Galletti arrived only fourth behind the centre-left governor Vasco Errani, the centre-right candidate Anna Maria Bernini and the Five Star Giovanni Favia. During the campaign he announced his support to nuclear power, which has been a long-time debate in Italy.

On 26 April 2012, Galletti was elected leader of the Union of Centre in the Chamber of Deputies, replacing his political mentor Pier Ferdinando Casini.

In the general election in the following year, Galletti ran in the coalition With Monti for Italy, led by incumbent Prime Minister Mario Monti, a centrist technocrat, but he did not succeed in being elected. However, after few months he was appointed undersecretary to the Education Ministry, in the Enrico Letta's government.

=== Minister of the Environment ===
On 22 February 2014, when the new secretary of the Democratic Party, Matteo Renzi, forced Letta to resign and became the new prime minister, Galletti was appointed by him as Minister of the Environment and Protection of Land and Sea.

His nomination was harshly criticized by many green associations due to his support to nuclear power; Monica Frassoni, a former MEP, accused Galletti of being only known as the "tax advisor of Pier Ferdinando Casini".

During the Italian rotating presidency of the EU Council in 2014, he led to the modification of the European legislation on GMOs, allowing each state to have decision-making autonomy on the cultivation of genetically modified organisms on its territory. During the same period, he advised the council of EU towards a more restrictive regulation on the use of single-use shopping bags.

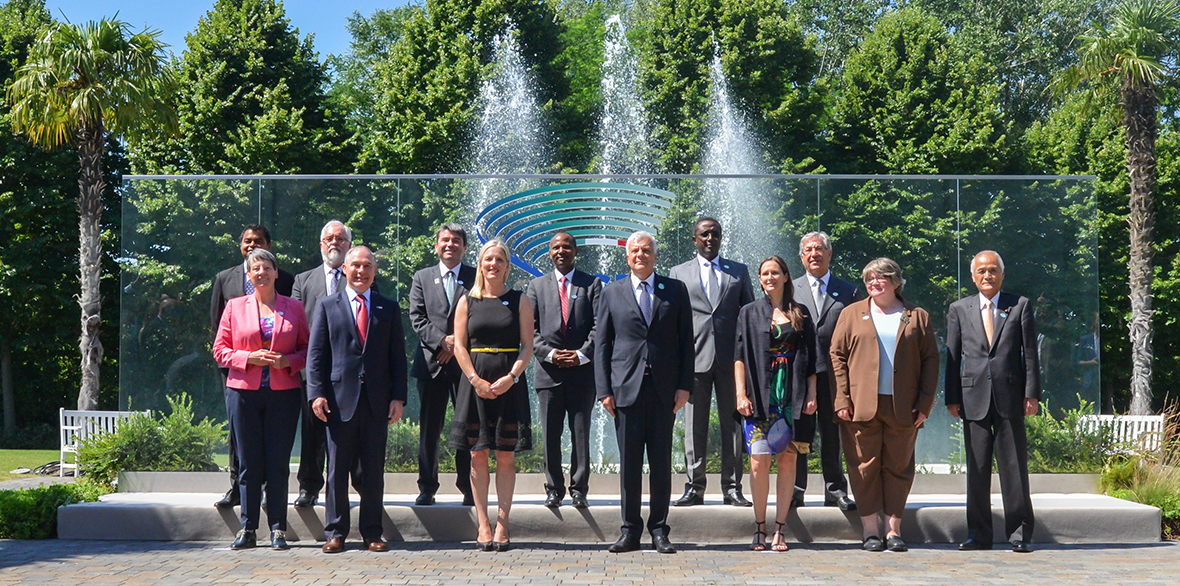
Galletti and the other Environment ministers, during the G7 in Bologna.

In September, he approved the plan to build the Trans Adriatic Pipeline (TAP), a pipeline project to transport natural gas, starting from Greece via Albania and the Adriatic Sea to Italy and further to Western Europe. This project was heavily opposed by the Apulian governor Michele Emiliano.

In November and December 2015, Galletti participated in the UN Climate Change Conference in Paris, better known as COP 21. The conference brought a global agreement on the reduction of climate change, the text of which represented a consensus of the representatives of the 196 parties attending it.

On 12 December 2016, when Renzi resigned as prime minister after the constitutional referendum, Galletti was confirmed as Environment minister by the new prime minister Paolo Gentiloni.

In the run-up of the constitutional referendum the Union of the Centre chose to campaign for "No", while Galletti, Casini and other centrist deputies were among the keenest supporters of "Yes". After the referendum, Casini, Galletti and Gianpiero D'Alia launched a new party, known as Centrists for Europe.

Galletti decided not to run in the 2018 general election, which then saw a large defeat of the centre-left coalition, to which his new party as part of the Popular Civic List belonged, (although Casini was reelected) and a plurality for the centre-right led by the populist League of Matteo Salvini, but also a strong showing for the anti-establishment Five Star Movement.

Political offices
Preceded by Andrea Orlando	Italian Minister of the Environment; 2014–2018	Succeeded by Sergio Costa
