= Tommaso Foti =

Italian politician (born 1960)

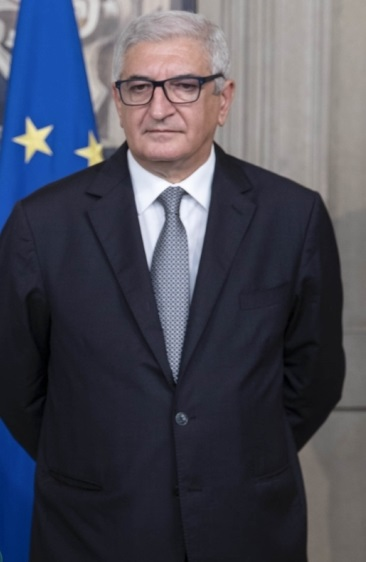
- Foti in 2019

Minister for European Affairs, Cohesion Policies and the NRRP
- Incumbent
- Assumed office 2 December 2024
- Prime Minister: Giorgia Meloni
- Preceded by: Raffaele Fitto

Member of the Chamber of Deputies
- Incumbent
- Assumed office 23 March 2018
- Constituency: Emilia-Romagna
- In office 9 May 1996 – 14 March 2013
- Constituency: Emilia-Romagna

Personal details
- Born: 28 April 1960 (age 66) Piacenza, Italy
- Party: FdI (since 2012)
- Other political affiliations: MSI (1976–1995); AN (1995–2009); PdL (2009–2012)
- Children: 1

Tommaso Foti (born 28 April 1960) is an Italian politician of Brothers of Italy serving as Minister of European Affairs (Cohesion policies and PNRR). He represented the National Alliance from 1996 to 2008, The People of Freedom from 2008 to 2013, and Brothers of Italy since 2018. Since 2022, he has served as group leader of Brothers of Italy in the chamber.

== Early career in politics ==
He began his political activity at a very young age, joining the Youth Front (FdG) at the age of 16, the youth organization of the Italian Social Movement-National Right (MSI-DN), in which he subsequently held the position of provincial secretary, member of the National Directorate, and in 1983 member of the National Executive.

In the administrative elections of 1980, he was elected city councilor of Piacenza for the Italian Social Movement, at the age of only 20, being subsequently confirmed in every consultation, also for the National Alliance, for another six terms and remaining in office until 2005.

In the regional elections in Emilia-Romagna in 1985 he was a candidate for the province of Piacenza in the lists of the MSI, but was not elected despite 3106 preferences.

In the political elections of 1987 he was a candidate for the Chamber of Deputies in the Parma-Modena-Piacenza-Reggio nell'Emilia constituency, obtaining 4423 preferences and being the first of the non-elected of the MSI.

In the 1992 political elections he was re-elected in the same constituency, but again with 1577 preferences he was the first of the non-elected.

In 1995 he joined Gianfranco Fini's Fiuggi turning point which led to the dissolution of the MSI-DN and the foundation of the National Alliance.

In the regional elections in Emilia-Romagna in 1995 he was included in the list of the center-right presidential candidate Gianfranco Morra, who however was defeated by the center-left challenger Pier Luigi Bersani: he was therefore not elected councilor.

== Election to the Chamber of Deputies ==
Elected to the Chamber of Deputies on the occasion of the 1996 general elections for the Pole for Freedom (in the National Alliance quota) in the constituency of Piacenza, where he obtained 41.32% and narrowly beat Gianfranco Pasquino (40.97%) and Giorgio Alessandrini of the Lega Nord (17.71%), he became a member of the board of directors of AN in the Chamber of Deputies for the XIII Legislature.

In 1998 he was also appointed deputy mayor of Piacenza with responsibility for the Budget, the Bursar and Taxes and Fees within the center-right municipal council led by Gianguido Guidotti He held the position until 2001, when he had to resign due to the incompatibility between national offices (i.e. the Presidency of the Bicameral) and local administrative positions.
