= 2024 Emilia-Romagna regional election =

Regional election in Italy

- 17–18 November 2024

All 50 seats to the Regional Council of Emilia-Romagna
- Turnout: 46.4% (▼21.3%)
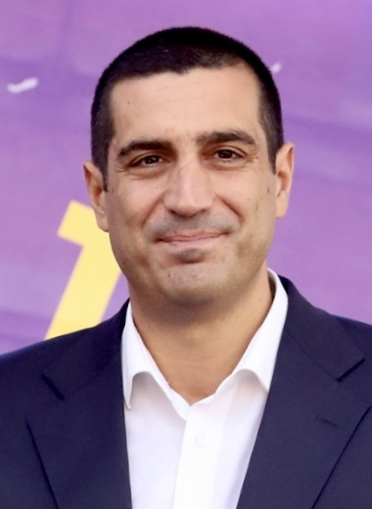

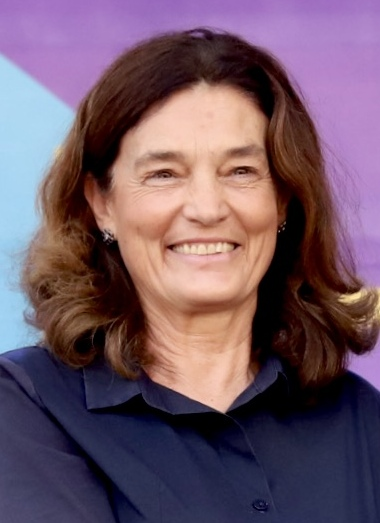
| | Majority party | Minority party |
|---|---|---|
| Candidate | Michele De Pascale | Elena Ugolini |
| Party | PD | Independent |
| Alliance | Centre-left | Centre-right |
| Seats won | 34 | 16 |
| Seat change | ▲5 | ▼3 |
| Popular vote | 922,150 | 650,935 |
| Percentage | 56.8% | 40.1% |
| Swing | ▲5.4% | ▼3.5% |
- Map of the election result
President before election
Stefano Bonaccini
PD
Elected President
Michele De Pascale
PD

The 2024 Emilia-Romagna regional election took place in Emilia-Romagna, Italy, on 17–18 November 2024.

The elections were called following Stefano Bonaccini's election to the European Parliament, a position incompatible with his post as the regional president. He resigned on 12 July 2024, on the same day, the Democratic Party unanimously nominated Mayor of Ravenna Michele De Pascale as its candidate. On 25 July, the centre-right coalition announced the candidacy of Elena Ugolini, a former undersecretary of state and school principal, without a party affiliation.

De Pascale defeated Ugolini by a 16.7 points margin, winning nearly 57% of the popular vote. The number of seats of the centre-left coalition in the Regional Council increased by 5, giving them a 2/3 supermajority.

== Electoral system ==
In Emilia-Romagna, a new electoral law was approved by the Legislative Assembly in July 2014, abolishing the blocked list.

The voter can express one or two preference votes for the candidates on the chosen list; in the case of the expression of two preferences, these must concern candidates of different sex according to "gender preference" (under penalty of annulment of the second preference). As regards the election of the councilors, the law guarantees in any case at least 27 seats on the lists that support the elected president (majority prize), obtaining effects that are very similar to those of the list but acting on the provincial lists. The first 40 seats are distributed on a proportional basis. A seat is then attributed to the candidate for president who came second. The remaining 9 seats are assigned by majority method to the lists that support the elected president if these lists have obtained less than 25 seats with the previous procedure, otherwise the "prize" will be only 4 seats. If, at the end of these assignments, the majority lists have not obtained at least 27 seats, these will be guaranteed by removing some of the seats already assigned to the opposition lists.

== Parties and candidates ==
| Political party or alliance | Constituent lists | Previous result | | Candidate |
| Political party or alliance | Constituent lists | % | Seats | Candidate |
|---|---|---|---|---|
| Centre-left coalition | Democratic Party | 34.7 | 22 | Michele De Pascale |
| Centre-left coalition | Greens and Left Alliance (incl. SI, EV, Pos) | 5.7 | 3 | Michele De Pascale |
| Centre-left coalition | Five Star Movement | 4.7 | 2 | Michele De Pascale |
| Centre-left coalition | Future Emilia-Romagna (incl. Az, +E, PSI, PRI, RI) | 1.5 | – | Michele De Pascale |
| Centre-left coalition | Civics with De Pascale for President (incl. IV, Volt) | – | – | Michele De Pascale |
| Centre-right coalition | League (incl. UDC) | 32.0 | 14 | Elena Ugolini |
| Centre-right coalition | Brothers of Italy | 8.6 | 3 | Elena Ugolini |
| Centre-right coalition | Forza Italia (incl. NM) | 2.6 | 1 | Elena Ugolini |
| Centre-right coalition | Civic Network – Ugolini for President | – | – | Elena Ugolini |
| Emilia-Romagna for Peace, Environment and Labour (incl. PRC, PCI, PaP) | | 0.7 | – | Federico Serra |
| Loyalty Coherence Truth (incl. M3V) | | 0.5 | – | Luca Teodori |

== Opinion polls ==
=== Candidates ===
| Date | Polling firm/ Client | Sample size | De Pascale | Ugolini | Others | Undecided | Lead |
| 18 Oct 2024 | Opinio (exit poll) | – | 53.0–57.0 | 39.0–43.0 | 1.0–4.0 | – | 14.0 |
| 18 Oct 2024 | SWG (exit poll) | – | 54.5–58.5 | 39.5–43.5 | 1.0–3.0 | – | 15.0 |
|---|---|---|---|---|---|---|---|
| 15 Oct 2024 | BiDiMedia | 1,000 | 55.9 | 42.5 | 1.6 | 22.0 | 13.4 |
| 15 Sep 2024 | YouTrend | 1,008 | 56.8 | 43.2 | 0.0 | 48.8 | 13.6 |
| 22 Aug 2024 | Noto | 1,000 | 52.0 | 44.0 | 4.0 | 31.0 | 8.0 |

== Results ==
17–18 November 2024 Emilia-Romagna regional election results
| Candidates | Votes | % | Seats | Parties | Votes | % | Seats |
|---|---|---|---|---|---|---|---|
| Michele De Pascale | 922,150 | 56.77 | 1 | Democratic Party | 641,704 | 42.94 | 27 |
| Michele De Pascale | 922,150 | 56.77 | 1 | Greens and Left Alliance | 79,236 | 5.30 | 3 |
| Michele De Pascale | 922,150 | 56.77 | 1 | Civics with De Pascale for President | 57,400 | 3.84 | 2 |
| Michele De Pascale | 922,150 | 56.77 | 1 | Five Star Movement | 53,075 | 3.55 | 1 |
| Michele De Pascale | 922,150 | 56.77 | 1 | Future Emilia-Romagna | 25,729 | 1.72 | – |
| Michele De Pascale | 922,150 | 56.77 | 1 | Total | 857,144 | 57.36 | 33 |
| Elena Ugolini | 650,935 | 40.07 | 1 | Brothers of Italy | 354,833 | 23.74 | 11 |
| Elena Ugolini | 650,935 | 40.07 | 1 | Forza Italia | 83,998 | 5.62 | 2 |
| Elena Ugolini | 650,935 | 40.07 | 1 | League | 78,734 | 5.27 | 1 |
| Elena Ugolini | 650,935 | 40.07 | 1 | Civic Network – Ugolini for President | 76,988 | 5.15 | 1 |
| Elena Ugolini | 650,935 | 40.07 | 1 | Total | 594,553 | 39.79 | 15 |
| Federico Serra | 31,483 | 1.94 | – | Emilia-Romagna for Peace, Environment and Labour | 27,337 | 1.83 | – |
| Luca Teodori | 19,831 | 1.22 | – | Loyalty Coherence Truth | 15,341 | 1.03 | – |
| Total candidates | 1,624,399 | 100.00 | 2 | Total parties | 1,494,375 | 100.00 | 48 |
| Blank and invalid votes | 35,643 | | | | | | |
| Registered voters/turnout | 3,576,427 | 46.42 | | | | | |
Source: Ministry of the Interior – Election in Emilia-Romagna

Popular vote
| PD | 42.94% |
| FdI | 23.74% |
| FI | 5.62% |
| AVS | 5.30% |
| Lega | 5.27% |
| RC | 5.15% |
| Civici | 3.84% |
| M5S | 3.55% |
| ERPAL | 1.83% |
| ERF | 1.72% |
| LCV | 1.03% |

President
| De Pascale | 56.77% |
| Ugolini | 40.07% |
| Serra | 1.94% |
| Teodori | 1.22% |

Seats summary
| Centre-left | 68.00% |
| Centre-right | 32.00% |

=== Results by province and capital city ===
| Province | Michele De Pascale | Elena Ugolini | Others |
|---|---|---|---|
| Bologna | 251,388 60.85% | 146,175 35.38% | 15,592 3.77% |
| Modena | 151,412 59.05% | 98,182 38.29% | 6,816 2.66% |
| Reggio Emilia | 116,493 62.49% | 63,611 34.12% | 6,303 3.39% |
| Parma | 77,303 51.24% | 69,211 45.88% | 4,354 2.89% |
| Forlì-Cesena | 81,985 58.17% | 55,270 39.22% | 3,674 2.61% |
| Ravenna | 86,987 58.16% | 57,438 38.40% | 5,135 3.52% |
| Ferrara | 58,147 48.77% | 57,533 48.25% | 3,559 2.98% |
| Rimini | 59,604 52.22% | 51,036 44.71% | 3,501 3.07% |
| Piacenza | 38,831 41.45% | 52,479 56.01% | 2,380 2.54% |
| Total | 922,150 56.77% | 650,935 40.07% | 51,314 3.16% |

| City | Michele De Pascale | Elena Ugolini | Others |
|---|---|---|---|
| Bologna | 102,589 63.55% | 51,567 31.94% | 7,281 4.51% |
| Modena | 46,486 65.85% | 22,286 31.57% | 1,822 2.58% |
| Reggio Emilia | 37,836 64.86% | 18,619 31.92% | 1,882 3.22% |
| Parma | 36,828 55.99% | 27,012 41.06% | 1,940 2.95% |
| Forlì | 24,799 58.91% | 16,271 38.65% | 1,028 2.44% |
| Ravenna | 34,962 58.22% | 22,666 37.75% | 2,421 4.03% |
| Ferrara | 26,816 54.17% | 21,160 42.74% | 1,530 3.09% |
| Rimini | 27,587 53.63% | 22,337 43.42% | 1,520 2.95% |
| Piacenza | 15,116 46.15% | 16,643 50.82% | 992 3.03% |

=== Turnout ===
| Region | Time | | | |
| Region | 12:00 | 19:00 | 23:00 | 15:00 |
|---|---|---|---|---|
| Emilia-Romagna | 11.55% | 31.01% | 35.77% | 46.42% |
| Province | Time | | | |
| Province | 12:00 | 19:00 | 23:00 | 15:00 |
| Bologna | 13.06% | 35.00% | 40.58% | 51.66% |
| Ferrara | 11.12% | 28.98% | 32.90% | 43.13% |
| Forlì-Cesena | 11.18% | 30.20% | 34.34% | 45.50% |
| Modena | 11.55% | 31.61% | 36.60% | 47.20% |
| Parma | 10.14% | 27.88% | 32.21% | 42.70% |
| Piacenza | 10.87% | 27.39% | 31.56% | 41.49% |
| Ravenna | 13.14% | 33.72% | 38.52% | 49.72% |
| Reggio Emilia | 11.41% | 30.66% | 35.25% | 45.44% |
| Rimini | 8.95% | 25.80% | 30.17% | 40.73% |
Source: Ministry of the Interior – Turnout

=== Elected councillors ===
| Constituency | Party | Member |
|---|---|---|
| Emilia-Romagna (at-large) | PD | Michele De Pascale (Note: As President of the Region.) |
| Emilia-Romagna (at-large) | RC | Elena Ugolini |
| Bologna | PD | Isabella Conti |
| Bologna | PD | Irene Priolo |
| Bologna | PD | Raffaele Donini |
| Bologna | PD | Maurizio Fabbri |
| Bologna | PD | Fabrizio Castellari |
| Bologna | FdI | Marta Evangelisti |
| Bologna | FdI | Francesco Sassone |
| Bologna | FI | Valentina Castaldini |
| Bologna | AVS | Simona Larghetti |
| Bologna | RC | Marco Mastacchi |
| Bologna | Civici | Giovanni Gordini |
| Bologna | M5S | Lorenzo Casadei |
| Modena | PD | Gian Carlo Muzzarelli |
| Modena | PD | Maria Costi |
| Modena | PD | Luca Sabattini |
| Modena | PD | Ludovica Ferrari |
| Modena | FdI | Annalisa Arletti |
| Modena | FdI | Ferdinando Pulitanò |
| Modena | AVS | Paolo Trande |
| Modena | Civici | Vincenzo Paldino |

| Constituency | Party | Member |
|---|---|---|
| Reggio Emilia | PD | Alessio Mammi |
| Reggio Emilia | PD | Elena Carletti |
| Reggio Emilia | PD | Andrea Costa |
| Reggio Emilia | PD | Anna Fornili |
| Reggio Emilia | FdI | Alessandro Aragona |
| Reggio Emilia | AVS | Paolo Burani |
| Parma | PD | Barabara Lori |
| Parma | PD | Andrea Massari |
| Parma | PD | Matteo Daffadà |
| Parma | FdI | Priamo Bocchi |
| Parma | FI | Pietro Vignali |
| Parma | Lega | Tommaso Fiazza |
| Forlì-Cesena | PD | Daniele Valbonesi |
| Forlì-Cesena | PD | Valentina Ancarani |
| Forlì-Cesena | PD | Francesca Lucchi |
| Forlì-Cesena | FdI | Luca Pestelli |
| Ravenna | PD | Eleonora Proni |
| Ravenna | PD | Niccolò Bosi |
| Ravenna | FdI | Alberto Ferrero |
| Rimini | PD | Alice Parma |
| Rimini | PD | Emma Petitti |
| Rimini | FdI | Nicola Marcello |

| Constituency | Party | Member |
|---|---|---|
| Piacenza | PD | Luca Quintavalla |
| Piacenza | PD | Lodovico Albasi |
| Piacenza | FdI | Giancarlo Tagliaferri |
| Ferrara | PD | Paolo Calvano |
| Ferrara | PD | Marcella Zappaterra |
| Ferrara | FdI | Alessandro Balboni |

== See also ==
- 2024 Italian regional elections
