= People's Energy (Italy) =

People's Energy Energia Popolare
- Leader: Stefano Bonaccini
- Founded: 21 July 2023
- Ideology: Social liberalism Social democracy Reformism
- Political position: Centre-left
- National affiliation: PD

People's Energy (Italian: Energia Popolare), is a big tent social-liberal and social-democratic faction within the Democratic Party (PD), a political party in Italy. The faction was founded by Stefano Bonaccini, party's president and governor of Emilia-Romagna.

== History ==
On 20 November 2022, the president of Emilia-Romagna, Stefano Bonaccini, formally announced his candidacy as leader of the Democratic Party in the upcoming leadership election. Bonaccini won the first round, achieving 52.87% among party members, but eventually lost to his former deputy Elly Schlein in the open primary election on 26 February 2023. He was successively named as the new party president on 12 March 2023, following an agreement between him and Schlein.

On 21 and 22 July, during a two-days convention in Cesena, Bonaccini launched his own political faction, named People's Energy, from the slogan chosen for the leadership election.
