= Pier Luigi Bersani =

Italian politician (born 1951)

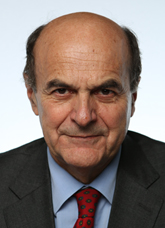

Secretary of the Democratic Party
- In office 7 November 2009 – 20 April 2013
- Deputy: Enrico Letta
- Preceded by: Dario Franceschini
- Succeeded by: Guglielmo Epifani

Minister of Economic Development
- In office 17 May 2006 – 8 May 2008
- Prime Minister: Romano Prodi
- Preceded by: Claudio Scajola (Productive Activities)
- Succeeded by: Claudio Scajola

Minister of Transports and Navigation
- In office 22 December 1999 – 11 June 2001
- Prime Minister: Massimo D'Alema
- Preceded by: Tiziano Treu
- Succeeded by: Pietro Lunardi (Infrastructures and Transports)

Minister of Industry, Commerce and Craftmanship
- In office 18 May 1996 – 22 December 1999
- Prime Minister: Romano Prodi
- Preceded by: Alberto Clò
- Succeeded by: Enrico Letta

President of Emilia-Romagna
- In office 6 July 1993 – 17 May 1996
- Preceded by: Enrico Boselli
- Succeeded by: Antonio La Forgia

Member of the Chamber of Deputies
- In office 28 April 2006 – 13 October 2022
- Constituency: Emilia-Romagna (2001–2013; 2018–2022); Lombardy (2013–2018)
- In office 30 May 2001 – 19 July 2004
- Constituency: Emilia-Romagna

Member of the European Parliament
- In office 20 July 2004 – 27 April 2006
- Constituency: North-West Italy

Personal details
- Born: 29 September 1951 (age 75) Bettola, Piacenza, Italy
- Party: PCI (before 1991); PDS (1991–1998); DS (1998–2007); PD (2007–2017; since 2023); Art1 (2017–2023)
- Height: 1.8 m (5 ft 11 in)
- Spouse: Daniela Ferrari
- Children: 2 daughters
- Education: University of Bologna
- Website: Official website

Pier Luigi Bersani (Italian pronunciation: [ˈpjɛr luˈiːdʒi berˈsaːni]; born 29 September 1951) is an Italian politician and was Secretary of the Democratic Party (PD), Italy's leading centre-left party, from 2009 to 2013. Bersani was Minister of Industry, Commerce and Craftmanship from 1996 to 1999, President of Emilia-Romagna from 1993 to 1996, Minister of Transport from 1999 to 2001, and Minister of Economic Development from 2006 to 2008.

== Early life ==
Pier Luigi Bersani was born on 29 September 1951 in Bettola, a mountain municipality in Nure Valley, in the province of Piacenza, Emilia-Romagna region, Italy. His father was a mechanic and a gas station clerk. After earning his high-school degree in Piacenza, Bersani enrolled in the University of Bologna where he graduated in philosophy with a dissertation on Pope Gregory I. He married Daniela in 1980, and he has two daughters: Elisa and Margherita. After a short experience as a teacher he committed his life to politics and public administration.

== Political career ==
=== Early political career ===
Bersani joined the Italian Communist Party and subsequently the Democratic Party of the Left. As member of the National Secretariat of the Democrats of the Left, he was responsible for the economic sector. As a young man, he became Vice-President of the Mountain Community of Piacenza, then elected in the Regional Council of Emilia-Romagna region and Vice-President of Emilia-Romagna in 1990; he was President of Emilia-Romagna from 1993 to 1996.

=== Centre-left cabinets (1996–2001) ===
After the general election of 1996 he was Minister of Industry, Commerce and Craftmanship (1996–1999) and Minister of Transports (1999–2001) in the centre-left cabinets of Prodi, D'Alema, Amato.

=== European Parliament (2004–2006) ===
In 2004, he was elected to the European Parliament representing the North-West region for the Democrats of the Left, part of the Socialist Group, and sat on the European Parliament's Committee on Economic and Monetary Affairs. He was a substitute for the Committee on the Internal Market and Consumer Protection, a member of the Delegation to the European Union-Kazakhstan, EU-Kyrgyzstan and EU-Uzbekistan Parliamentary Cooperation Committees, and for relations with Tajikistan, Turkmenistan and Mongolia, and a substitute for the Delegation for relations with Belarus. He left the European Parliament on his re-election to the Chamber of Deputies in 2006, and he was appointed as Minister of Economic Development in the government of Prime Minister Romano Prodi on 17 May 2006.

=== Prodi II Cabinet (2006–2008) ===
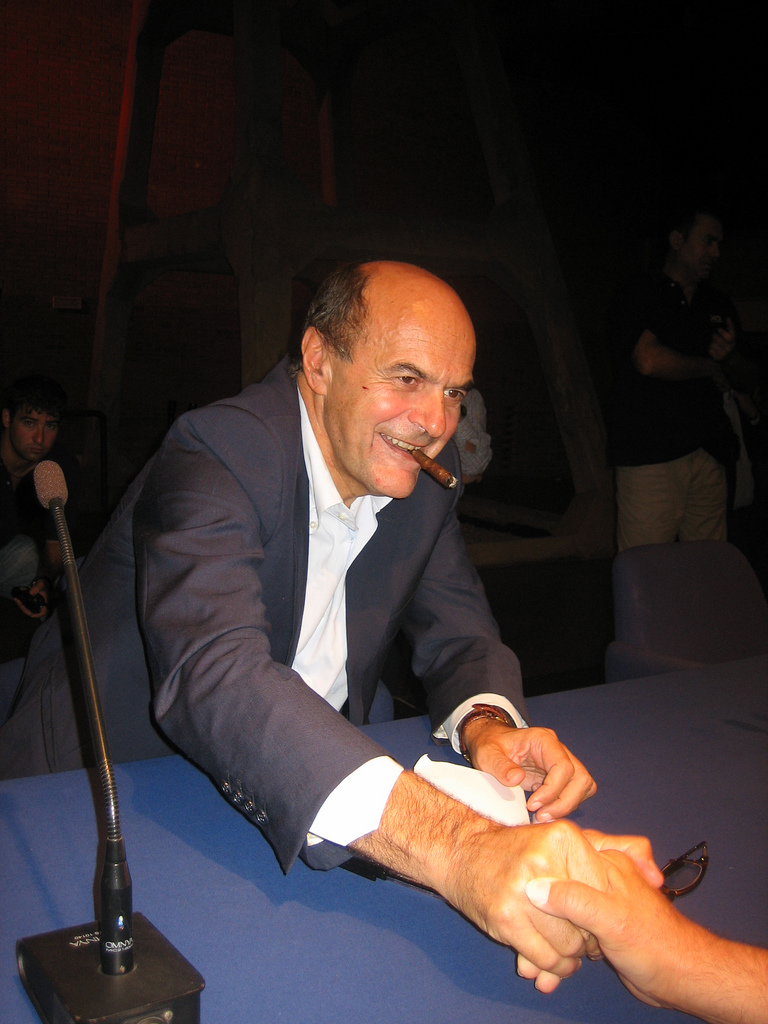
Bersani at the Festa de l'Unità, the official festival of the Democratic Party

The Prodi II Cabinet assigned Bersani, as the Minister of Economic Development, the task of introducing reforms aimed at achieving increased market liberalization and competition. The minister responded with Decree Law 223 of 30 June 2006, later converted into Law 248/2006, popularly known as the "Bersani 1" decree on taxi drivers and pharmacies, although it also addressed other sectors. In 2021, Bersani said that economic liberalization does not mean entrusting everything to the market, which he describes as liberismo, right-wing, and distinct. In his view, liberalization means defending the common citizen from the market and ensuring that there are no dominant positions.

The government's policy of competition and liberalization would not to stop there. "Bersani 1" was followed by "Bersani 2" (decree 7 of 31 January 2007, converted into Law 40 of 2 April 2007), and then by a series of bills for the liberalization of the professions and television broadcasting, local public services, and energy, as well as the reduction and simplification of times and procedures for the start up of new businesses. Another bill proposed to rationalize the jurisdictions of the regulatory authorities, modifying and reinforcing their powers, particularly with regard to competition. Still another bill would introduce and regulate the judicial procedures for class action lawsuits.

=== Secretary of the Democratic Party of Italy (2009–2013) ===
On 25 October 2009, Bersani defeated incumbents Dario Franceschini and Ignazio Marino in the Democratic Party leadership election, thus becoming Italy's main opposition leader, scoring 55.1% among party members. Since 7 November 2009, as decided by the National Assembly, Pier Luigi Bersani officially took office as Secretary of the Democratic Party of Italy. He defeated the mayor of Florence Matteo Renzi in the 2012 primary election.

== 2013 elections ==
Before the 2013 Italian general election, the Democratic Party was ahead but at "the beginning of the year, Bersani’s party was above 40%, and former centre-right Prime Minister Silvio Berlusconi was hovering around 25%. By the time [reported] polling stopped [a week before the vote], the right was up to 30% and the left down to 35%. Outgoing appointed-technocrat Prime Minister Mario Monti's centrist party-coalition was at less than 15% of the vote and the protest Five-Star Movement led by comedian Beppe Grillo was getting more than 15%".

In the general elections on 24–25 February 2013, as a consequence of the electoral system the PD-led centre-left coalition, Italy Common Good, took a small absolute majority in the lower house. In most of the rest of Europe, this would have been enough to make Bersani Prime Minister. However, the coalition failed to gain a majority in the Senate. Unlike in most parliamentary systems, the Chamber of Deputies and the Senate have equal power, and Italian governments must maintain the confidence of both chambers in order to stay in office. Bersani said he would try to form a government with the informal support of Five Star Movement. Anna Finocchiaro, PD's leader in the Senate, confirmed the likelihood PD would not form a new coalition with Berlusconi's centre-right coalition.

On 22 March President Giorgio Napolitano asked Bersani to form a new government. On 27 March Bersani failed to strike a deal for forming a new Italian government with the grassroots Five-Star Movement (M5S) which held the balance of power after February's inconclusive elections. On 19 April Bersani announced he would be stepping down from his post as Democratic Party leader after Romano Prodi failed to secure a parliamentary majority in the presidential election.

== Other activities ==
In 2001, Bersani co-founded with Vincenzo Visco the NENS ("New Economy, New Society") think tank. He is also chairman of the Nuova Romea Society that was established in 2002 with the objective of the development of Emilia-Romagna and Veneto territories.

== Electoral history ==
Election	House	Constituency	Party	Votes	Result
1980	Regional Council of Emilia-Romagna	Piacenza	PCI	2,991	Elected
1985	Regional Council of Emilia-Romagna	Piacenza	PCI	3,623	Elected
1990	Regional Council of Emilia-Romagna	Piacenza	PCI	3,690	Elected
1995	Regional Council of Emilia-Romagna	Emilia-Romagna-at-large	PDS	– (Note: Elected in a closed list proportional representation system.)	Elected
2001	Chamber of Deputies	Fidenza	DS	47,303	Elected
2004	European Parliament	North-West Italy	DS	346,683	Elected
2006	Chamber of Deputies	Emilia-Romagna	DS	–	Elected
2008	Chamber of Deputies	Emilia-Romagna	PD	–	Elected
2013	Chamber of Deputies	Lombardy 2	PD	–	Elected
2018	Chamber of Deputies	Emilia-Romagna	LeU	–	Elected

=== First-past-the-post elections ===
2001 general election (C): Fidenza
Candidate	Coalition	Votes	%
Pier Luigi Bersani	The Olive Tree (DS)	47,303	49.5
Paolo Paglia	House of Freedoms (FI)	42,374	44.4
Others		5,813	6.1
Total		95,490	100.0

== Honours ==
- Légion d'honneur

Political offices
Preceded by Enrico Boselli	President of Emilia-Romagna; 1994–1996	Succeeded by Antonio La Forgia
Preceded by Alberto Clò	Minister of Industry, Commerce and Craftsmanship; 1996–1999	Succeeded by Enrico Letta
Preceded by Tiziano Treu	Minister of Transports and Navigation; 1999–2001	Succeeded by Pietro Lunardi as Minister of Infrastructures and Transports
Preceded by Claudio Scajola as Minister of Productive Activities	Minister of Economic Development; 2006–2008	Succeeded by Claudio Scajola
Party political offices
Preceded by Dario Franceschini	Secretary of the Democratic Party; 2009–2013	Succeeded by Guglielmo Epifani
