= Emma Petitti =

Italian politician (born 1970)

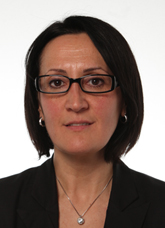
- Petitti in 2013

Member of the Chamber of Deputies
- In office 15 March 2013 – 12 January 2015
- Succeeded by: Paola Boldrini
- Constituency: Emilia-Romagna

Personal details
- Born: 12 May 1970 (age 56)
- Party: Democratic Party

Emma Petitti (born 12 May 1970) is an Italian politician serving as a member of the Legislative Assembly of Emilia-Romagna since 2020. From 2020 to 2024, she served as president of the Assembly. From 2013 to 2015, she was a member of the Chamber of Deputies. From 2014 to 2020, she served as assessor for the budget of Emilia-Romagna.
