= Antonio La Forgia =

Italian politician (1944–2022)

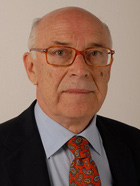
- La Forgia in 2018

Member of the Chamber of Deputies
- In office 28 April 2006 – 14 March 2013
- Constituency: Emilia-Romagna

President of the Legislative Assembly of Emilia-Romagna
- In office 7 June 2000 – 4 April 2005
- Preceded by: Celestina Ceruti
- Succeeded by: Monica Donini

President of Emilia-Romagna
- In office 17 May 1996 – 3 March 1999
- Preceded by: Pier Luigi Bersani
- Succeeded by: Vasco Errani

Personal details
- Born: 24 December 1944 Forlì, Italy
- Died: 10 June 2022 (aged 77) Bologna, Italy
- Party: Italian Communist Party (until 1991); Democratic Party of the Left (1991–1998); The Democrats (1999–2002); Democracy is Freedom – The Daisy (2002–2007); Democratic Party (2007–2022)
- Education: University of Bologna

Antonio La Forgia (24 December 1944 – 10 June 2022) was an Italian politician. From 1996 to 1999, he was president of Emilia-Romagna and of the Emilia-Romagna Legislative Assembly from 2000 to 2005. From 2006 to 2013, he served as deputy, representing the Democratic Party.

La Forgia died in Bologna on 10 June 2022, at the age of 77.

== Biography ==
After graduating in physics, he joined the Italian Communist Party and served as councilor for personnel organization and management in Bologna. From 1985 to 1990, he was also councilor for innovation in Bologna. From 1991 to 1993, he was municipal secretary of the Democratic Party of the Left in Bologna, while from 1993 to 1996 he was appointed regional secretary of the PDS.

President of the Emilia-Romagna Region since 1996, he resigned in 1999 after joining Prodi's I Democratici project, of which he was a member of the regional council. With this party, he ran in the 1999 European elections in the northwestern Italy constituency, obtaining over 8,000 votes but not being elected.

He subsequently joined the Democracy is Freedom – The Daisy party. He then participated in the formation of the Democratic Party, running for regional secretary of the new party in Emilia-Romagna in the primaries on October 14, 2007, where he obtained 18.99% of the votes and is one of the leading figures in the Prodi-Ulivo wing of the party.

In the 2006 general election, he was nominated and elected to the Chamber of Deputies (Italy) in the Emilia-Romagna (Chamber of Deputies constituency) constituency on the L'Ulivo list.

In the 2008 general election, he was re-elected as a member of parliament for the Emilia-Romagna (Chamber of Deputies constituency) constituency in the ranks of the PD. He ended his parliamentary term in 2013.

He died on June 10, 2022, at the age of 77 in Bologna; suffering from terminal cancer, he had opted for deep Sedation a few days earlier.
