= 2005 Emilia-Romagna regional election =

← 2000	3–4 April 2005	2010 →

All 50 seats to the Regional Council of Emilia-Romagna
- Turnout: 76.67% (▼3.05%)
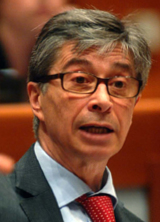

	Majority party	Minority party
Leader	Vasco Errani	Carlo Monaco
Party	DS	FI
Alliance	The Union	House of Freedoms
Seats won	32	18
Seat change	▼1	▲1
Popular vote	1,579,989	886,775
Percentage	62.7%	35.3%
Swing	▲6.2%	▼5.0%
- Seat totals by Province. As this is a PR election, seat totals are determined by popular vote in each province.
President before election
Vasco Errani
DS
President-elect
Vasco Errani
DS

The Emilia-Romagna regional election of 2005 took place on 3–4 April 2005.

The incumbent President Vasco Errani, a member of the social democratic Democrats of the Left, was re-elected defeating by a landslide Carlo Monaco, the candidate of the centre-right coalition led by Forza Italia.

== Electoral system ==
Regional elections in Emilia-Romagna were ruled by the "Tatarella law" (approved in 1995), which provided for a mixed electoral system: four fifths of the regional councilors were elected in provincial constituencies by proportional representation, using the largest remainder method with a droop quota and open lists, while the residual votes and the unassigned seats were grouped into a "single regional constituency", where the whole ratios and the highest remainders were divided with the Hare method among the provincial party lists; one fifth of the council seats instead was reserved for regional lists and assigned with a majoritarian system: the leader of the regional list that scored the highest number of votes was elected to the presidency of the Region while the other candidates were elected regional councilors.

A threshold of 3% had been established for the provincial lists, which, however, could still have entered the regional council if the regional list to which they were connected had scored at least 5% of valid votes.

The panachage was also allowed: the voter can indicate a candidate for the presidency but prefer a provincial list connected to another candidate.

== Parties and candidates ==
Political party or alliance	Constituent lists	Previous result		Candidate
Political party or alliance	Constituent lists	Votes (%)	Seats	Candidate
The Union	The Olive Tree	44.5	19	Vasco Errani
The Union	Communist Refoundation Party	5.7	2	Vasco Errani
The Union	Federation of the Greens	2.7	1	Vasco Errani
The Union	Party of Italian Communists	2.1	1	Vasco Errani
The Union	Union of Democrats for Europe	0.1	–	Vasco Errani
The Union	Italy of Values	—	—	Vasco Errani
House of Freedoms	Forza Italia	21.1	10	Monaco Carlo
House of Freedoms	National Alliance	11.4	4	Monaco Carlo
House of Freedoms	Union of Christian and Centre Democrats	3.7	1	Monaco Carlo
House of Freedoms	Northern League Emilia-Romagna (LNE+LNR)	3.3	1	Monaco Carlo
House of Freedoms	New Italian Socialist Party	0.4	–	Monaco Carlo

== Results ==
3–4 April 2005 Emilia-Romagna regional election results
Candidates	Votes	%	Seats	Parties	Votes	%	Seats
Vasco Errani	1,579,989	62.73	5				
Vasco Errani	1,579,989	62.73	5	The Olive Tree	1,095,566	48.03	22
Vasco Errani	1,579,989	62.73	5	Communist Refoundation Party	130,609	5.73	2
Vasco Errani	1,579,989	62.73	5	Party of Italian Communists	79,406	3.48	1
Vasco Errani	1,579,989	62.73	5	Federation of the Greens	69,475	3.05	1
Vasco Errani	1,579,989	62.73	5	Italy of Values	31,929	1.40	1
Vasco Errani	1,579,989	62.73	5	Union of Democrats for Europe	7,732	0.34	–
Vasco Errani	1,579,989	62.73	5	Total	1,414,717	62.02	27
Monaco Carlo	886,775	35.21	1				
Monaco Carlo	886,775	35.21	1	Forza Italia	415,406	18.21	9
Monaco Carlo	886,775	35.21	1	National Alliance	201,963	8.85	4
Monaco Carlo	886,775	35.21	1	Northern League Emilia-Romagna	109,092	4.78	3
Monaco Carlo	886,775	35.21	1	Union of Christian and Centre Democrats	89,787	3.94	1
Monaco Carlo	886,775	35.21	1	New Italian Socialist Party	19,372	0.85	–
Monaco Carlo	886,775	35.21	1	Total	835,620	36.63	17
Bruno Barbieri	26,712	1.06	–	Consumers' List	15,520	0.68	–
Gianni Correggiari	25,052	0.99	–	Social Alternative	15,193	0.67	–
Total candidates	2,518,528	100.00	6	Total parties	2,281,050	100.00	44
Source: Ministry of the Interior – Historical Archive of Elections

Popular vote
Ulivo	48.03%
FI	18.21%
AN	8.85%
PRC	5.73%
LN	4.78%
UDC	3.94%
PdCI	3.48%
FdV	3.05%
Others	3.94%

President
Errani	62.73%
Monaco	35.21%
Barbieri	1.06%
Correggiari	0.99%
