= Luciano Guerzoni (born 1935) =

Italian politician

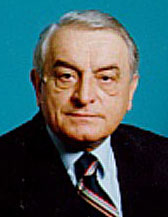

Member of the Senate
- In office 9 May 1996 – 27 April 2006
- In office 23 April 1992 – 14 April 1994

President of the Legislative Assembly of Emilia-Romagna
- In office 25 June 1990 – 13 January 1992
- Preceded by: Giovanni Piepoli
- Succeeded by: Federico Castellucci

President of Emilia-Romagna
- In office 28 April 1987 – 24 June 1990
- Preceded by: Lanfranco Turci
- Succeeded by: Enrico Boselli

Personal details
- Born: 28 July 1935 Modena
- Died: 10 August 2017 (aged 82) Modena
- Party: Democrats of the Left
- Other political affiliations: Democratic Party of the Left; Italian Communist Party
- Occupation: politician

Luciano Guerzoni (28 July 1935 – 10 August 2017) was an Italian politician.

He was born in Modena, and spent all of his political career representing Emilia-Romagna. Guerzoni was president of the region from 1987 to 1990 and led its legislative assembly from 1990 to 1992. Guerzoni then represented Emilia-Romagna in the Senate for three terms, from 1992 to 1994 and again from 1996 to 2006.
