= 2010 Emilia-Romagna regional election =

← 2005	28–29 March 2010	2014 →

All 50 seats to the Regional Council of Emilia-Romagna
- Turnout: 68.07% (▼8.6%)
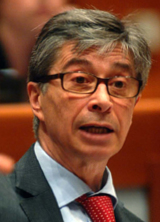

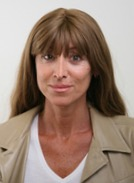
	Majority party	Minority party
Leader	Vasco Errani	Anna Maria Bernini
Party	PD	PdL
Alliance	Centre-left	Centre-right
Seats won	32	15
Seat change	Steady	▼3
Popular vote	1,197,789	844,915
Percentage	52.1%	36.7%
Swing	▼10.6%	▲1.5%
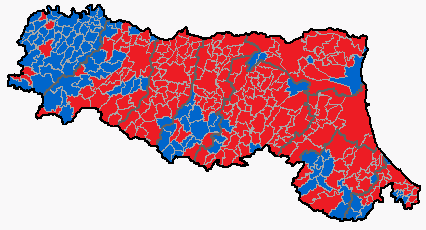
- Map of the election result
President before election
Vasco Errani
PD
President-elect
Vasco Errani
PD

The Emilia-Romagna regional election of 2010 took place on 28–29 March 2010.

The two-term incumbent President of the Region, Vasco Errani of the centre-left Democratic Party defeated Anna Maria Bernini (backed by The People of Freedom and Lega Nord Emilia-Romagna) and Gian Luca Galletti (Union of the Centre).

Errani (–10.6% compared to 2005) and the Democrats (–7.7%) lost ground to the Five Star Movement, whose candidate won a surprising 7.0% of the vote, in what was the worst result for the centre-left in a regional election in Emilia–Romagna. The other surprise of the election was Lega Nord, which gained 13.7% of the vote, up from 4.8% in 2005.

== Electoral system ==
Regional elections in Emilia-Romagna were ruled by the "Tatarella law" (approved in 1995), which provided for a mixed electoral system: four fifths of the regional councilors were elected in provincial constituencies by proportional representation, using the largest remainder method with a droop quota and open lists, while the residual votes and the unassigned seats were grouped into a "single regional constituency", where the whole ratios and the highest remainders were divided with the Hare method among the provincial party lists; one fifth of the council seats instead was reserved for regional lists and assigned with a majoritarian system: the leader of the regional list that scored the highest number of votes was elected to the presidency of the Region while the other candidates were elected regional councilors.

A threshold of 3% had been established for the provincial lists, which, however, could still have entered the regional council if the regional list to which they were connected had scored at least 5% of valid votes.

The panachage was also allowed: the voter can indicate a candidate for the presidency but prefer a provincial list connected to another candidate.

== Parties and candidates ==
Political party or alliance	Constituent lists	Previous result		Candidate
Political party or alliance	Constituent lists	Votes (%)	Seats	Candidate
Centre-left coalition	Democratic Party	48.0	22	Vasco Errani
Centre-left coalition	Federation of the Left	9.2	3	Vasco Errani
Centre-left coalition	Left Ecology Freedom – Greens	3.0	1	Vasco Errani
Centre-left coalition	Italy of Values	1.4	1	Vasco Errani
Centre-left coalition	Pensioners' Party	—	—	Vasco Errani
Centre-right coalition	The People of Freedom	27.1	13	Anna Maria Bernini
Centre-right coalition	Northern League Emilia-Romagna (LNE+LNR)	4.8	3	Anna Maria Bernini
Centre-right coalition	The Right	—	—	Anna Maria Bernini
Union of the Centre		3.9	1	Gian Luca Galletti
Five Star Movement		—	—	Giovanni Favia

== Results ==
Seats in each constituency

28–29 March 2010 Emilia-Romagna regional election results
Candidates	Votes	%	Seats	Parties	Votes	%	Seats
Vasco Errani	1,197,789	52.07	10				
Vasco Errani	1,197,789	52.07	10	Democratic Party	857,613	40.65	18
Vasco Errani	1,197,789	52.07	10	Italy of Values	136,040	6.45	2
Vasco Errani	1,197,789	52.07	10	Federation of the Left	58,943	2.79	1
Vasco Errani	1,197,789	52.07	10	Left Ecology Freedom – Greens	37,698	1.79	1
Vasco Errani	1,197,789	52.07	10	Pensioners' Party	5,310	0.25	–
Vasco Errani	1,197,789	52.07	10	Total	1,095,604	51.93	22
Anna Maria Bernini	844,915	36.73	1				
Anna Maria Bernini	844,915	36.73	1	The People of Freedom	518,108	24.56	10
Anna Maria Bernini	844,915	36.73	1	Northern League Emilia-Romagna	288,601	13.68	4
Anna Maria Bernini	844,915	36.73	1	The Right	1,695	0.08	–
Anna Maria Bernini	844,915	36.73	1	Total	808,404	38.32	14
Giovanni Favia	161,056	7.00	–	Five Star Movement	126,619	6.00	2
Gian Luca Galletti	96,625	4.20	–	Union of the Centre	79,244	3.76	1
Total candidates	2,300,385	100.00	11	Total parties	2,109,871	100.00	39
Source: Ministry of the Interior – Historical Archive of Elections

Popular vote
PD	40.65%
PdL	24.56%
LN	13.68%
IdV	6.45%
M5S	6.00%
UdC	3.76%
FdS	2.79%
SEL	1.79%
Others	0.33%

President
Errani	52.07%
Bernini	36.73%
Favia	7.00%
Galletti	4.20%
