= 2000 Emilia-Romagna regional election =

- 16 April 2000

All 50 seats to the Regional Council of Emilia-Romagna
- Turnout: 79.72% (▼8.58%)
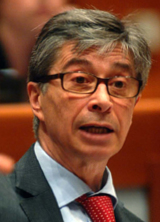

	Majority party	Minority party
Leader	Vasco Errani	Gabriele Cané
Party	DS	FI
Alliance	The Olive Tree	Pole for Freedoms
Seats won	33	17
Seat change	▼1	▲5
Popular vote	1,451,468	1,036,660
Percentage	56.5%	40.3%
Swing	▲2.7%	▲8.3%
- Seat totals by Province. As this is a PR election, seat totals are determined by popular vote in each province.
President before election
Vasco Errani
DS
President-elect
Vasco Errani
DS

The Emilia-Romagna regional election of 2000 took place on 16 April 2000.

Vasco Errani (Democrats of the Left), who had replaced Pier Luigi Bersani in 1999, was re-elected President, defeating Gabriele Cané, the candidate of Forza Italia.

== Electoral system ==
Regional elections in Emilia-Romagna were ruled by the "Tatarella law" (approved in 1995), which provided for a mixed electoral system: four fifths of the regional councilors were elected in provincial constituencies by proportional representation, using the largest remainder method with a droop quota and open lists, while the residual votes and the unassigned seats were grouped into a "single regional constituency", where the whole ratios and the highest remainders were divided with the Hare method among the provincial party lists; one fifth of the council seats instead was reserved for regional lists and assigned with a majoritarian system: the leader of the regional list that scored the highest number of votes was elected to the presidency of the Region while the other candidates were elected regional councilors.

A threshold of 3% had been established for the provincial lists, which, however, could still have entered the regional council if the regional list to which they were connected had scored at least 5% of valid votes.

The panachage was also allowed: the voter can indicate a candidate for the presidency but prefer a provincial list connected to another candidate.

== Parties and candidates ==
Political party or alliance	Constituent lists	Previous result		Candidate
Political party or alliance	Constituent lists	Votes (%)	Seats	Candidate
Centre-left coalition	Democrats of the Left	43.0	20	Vasco Errani
Centre-left coalition	Communist Refoundation Party	7.6	3	Vasco Errani
Centre-left coalition	Italian People's Party – Italian Renewal – UPR	5.6	2	Vasco Errani
Centre-left coalition	Federation of the Greens	3.2	1	Vasco Errani
Centre-left coalition	Italian Republican Party	1.3	–	Vasco Errani
Centre-left coalition	The Democrats	—N/a	—N/a	Vasco Errani
Centre-left coalition	Party of Italian Communists	—N/a	—N/a	Vasco Errani
Centre-left coalition	Italian Democratic Socialists	—N/a	—N/a	Vasco Errani
Centre-left coalition	Union of Democrats for Europe	—N/a	—N/a	Vasco Errani
Centre-right coalition	Forza Italia	18.2	7	Gianfranco Morra
Centre-right coalition	National Alliance	10.3	4	Gianfranco Morra
Centre-right coalition	Northern League Emilia-Romagna (LNE+LNR)	3.4	1	Gianfranco Morra
Centre-right coalition	Christian Democratic Centre	2.3	1	Gianfranco Morra
Centre-right coalition	United Christian Democrats	—N/a	—N/a	Gianfranco Morra
Centre-right coalition	Others	—N/a	—N/a	Gianfranco Morra
Bonino List		1.3	–	Sergio Stanzani

== Results ==
16 April 2000 Emilia-Romagna regional election results
Candidates	Votes	%	Seats	Parties	Votes	%	Seats
Vasco Errani	1,451,468	56.47	10				
Vasco Errani	1,451,468	56.47	10	Democrats of the Left	869,242	36.10	16
Vasco Errani	1,451,468	56.47	10	Communist Refoundation Party	138,464	5.75	2
Vasco Errani	1,451,468	56.47	10	The Democrats	113,132	4.70	2
Vasco Errani	1,451,468	56.47	10	Italian People's Party – Italian Renewal – Union for the Republic	70,808	2.94	1
Vasco Errani	1,451,468	56.47	10	Federation of the Greens	64,005	2.66	1
Vasco Errani	1,451,468	56.47	10	Party of Italian Communists	49,686	2.06	1
Vasco Errani	1,451,468	56.47	10	Italian Democratic Socialists	29,934	1.24	–
Vasco Errani	1,451,468	56.47	10	Italian Republican Party	21,625	0.90	–
Vasco Errani	1,451,468	56.47	10	Union of Democrats for Europe	1,363	0.06	–
Vasco Errani	1,451,468	56.47	10	Total	1,358,259	56.41	23
Gabriele Cané	1,036,660	40.33	1				
Gabriele Cané	1,036,660	40.33	1	Forza Italia	509,084	21.14	10
Gabriele Cané	1,036,660	40.33	1	National Alliance	274,420	11.40	4
Gabriele Cané	1,036,660	40.33	1	Northern League Emilia-Romagna	79,714	3.31	1
Gabriele Cané	1,036,660	40.33	1	Christian Democratic Centre	47,664	1.98	1
Gabriele Cané	1,036,660	40.33	1	United Christian Democrats	42,548	1.77	–
Gabriele Cané	1,036,660	40.33	1	Socialist Party	9,507	0.39	–
Gabriele Cané	1,036,660	40.33	1	Governing Emilia Romagna	8,094	0.34	–
Gabriele Cané	1,036,660	40.33	1	The Liberals Sgarbi	6,810	0.28	–
Gabriele Cané	1,036,660	40.33	1	Total	977.841	40.61	16
Sergio Stanzani	70,655	2.75	–	Bonino List	62,611	2.60	–
Carlo Rasmi	11,447	0.45	–	Popular Action	9,080	0.38	–
Total candidates	2,570,230	100.00	11	Total parties	2,407,791	100.00	39
Source: Ministry of the Interior – Historical Archive of Elections

Popular vote
DS	36.10%
FI	21.14%
AN	11.40%
PRC	5.75%
Dem	4.70%
LN	3.31%
PPI–RI–UpR	2.94%
FdV	2.66%
Bonino List	2.60%
PdCI	2.06%
Others	7.34%

President
Errani	56.47%
Cané	40.33%
Stanzani	2.75%
Rasmi	0.45%
