= 2014 Emilia-Romagna regional election =

- 23 November 2014

All 50 seats to the Regional Council of Emilia-Romagna
- Turnout: 37.7% (▼30.37%)
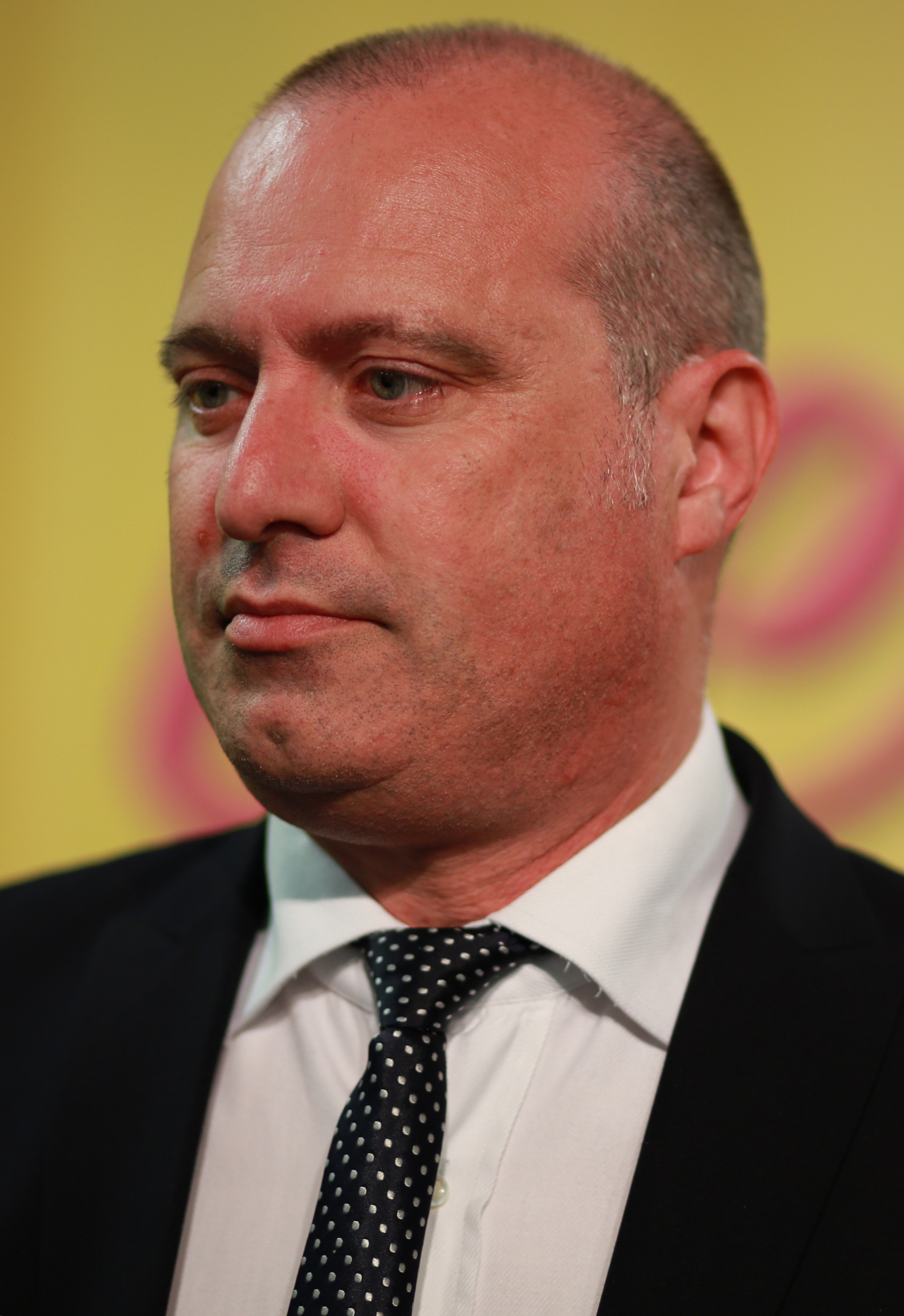

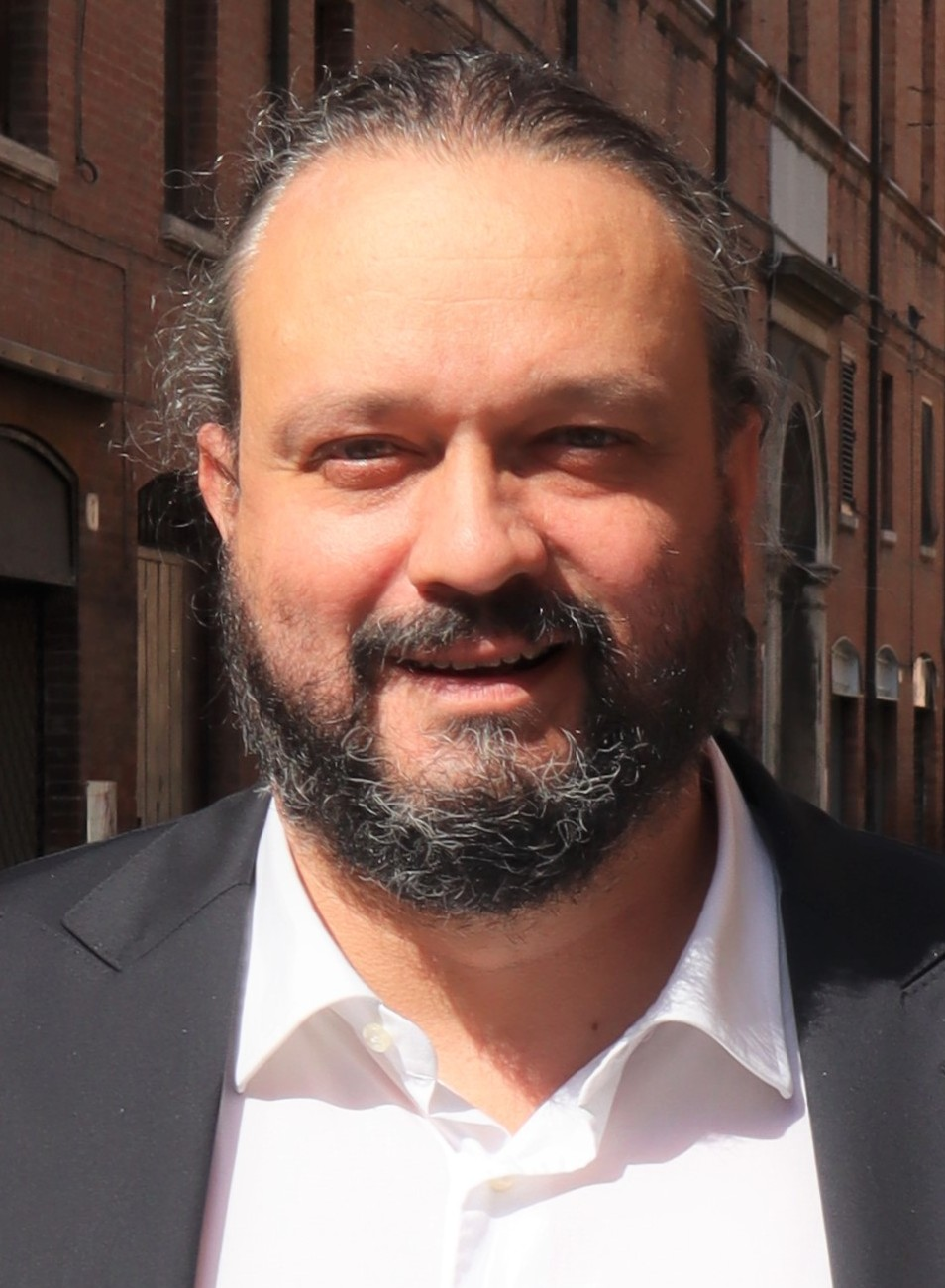
	Majority party	Minority party
Leader	Stefano Bonaccini	Alan Fabbri
Party	PD	Lega
Alliance	Centre-left	Centre-right
Seats won	32	12
Seat change	Steady	▼3
Popular vote	615,723	374,736
Percentage	49.1	29.8
Swing	▼3.0%	▼6.9%
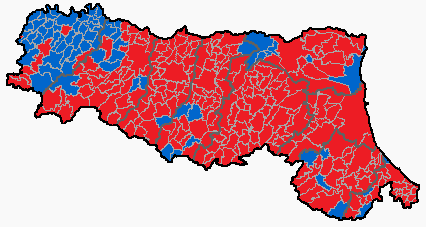
- Map of the election result
President before election
Vasco Errani
PD
President
Stefano Bonaccini
PD

The Emilia-Romagna regional election of 2014 took place on 23 November 2014.

The three-term incumbent President of the Region, Vasco Errani of the centre-left Democratic Party resigned in July 2014 after the conviction for fraudulent misrepresentation, triggering a snap election.

In an election marked by the lowest turnout ever in the Region (37.7%), Stefano Bonaccini, a Democrat, was elected President by defeating several candidates, mainly Alan Fabbri of the Northern League (29.9%) and Giulia Gibertoni of the Five Star Movement (13.3%).

== Electoral system ==
In Emilia-Romagna, a new electoral law was approved by the Legislative Assembly in July 2014, abolishing the blocked list. The first elections regulated by this law were the regional elections of 2014.

The voter can express one or two preference votes for the candidates on the chosen list; in the case of the expression of two preferences, these must concern candidates of different sex according to "gender preference" (under penalty of annulment of the second preference). As regards the election of the councilors, the law guarantees in any case at least 27 seats on the lists that support the elected president (majority prize), obtaining effects that are very similar to those of the list but acting on the provincial lists. The first 40 seats are distributed on a proportional basis. A seat is then attributed to the candidate for president who came second. The remaining 9 seats are assigned by majority method to the lists that support the elected president if these lists have obtained less than 25 seats with the previous procedure, otherwise the "prize" will be only 4 seats. If, at the end of these assignments, the majority lists have not obtained at least 27 seats, these will be guaranteed by removing some of the seats already assigned to the opposition lists.

== Parties and leaders ==
Political party or alliance	Constituent lists	Previous result		Candidate
Political party or alliance	Constituent lists	Votes (%)	Seats	Candidate
Centre-left coalition	Democratic Party	40.6	18	Stefano Bonaccini
Centre-left coalition	Left Ecology Freedom	1.8	1	Stefano Bonaccini
Centre-left coalition	Civic Emilia-Romagna (incl. PSI, Greens and SC)	—N/a	—N/a	Stefano Bonaccini
Centre-left coalition	Democratic Centre – DemoS (incl. IdV)	—N/a	—N/a	Stefano Bonaccini
Centre-right coalition	Forza Italia	24.6	10	Alan Fabbri
Centre-right coalition	Northern League Emilia-Romagna (incl. LNE+LNR)	13.7	4	Alan Fabbri
Centre-right coalition	Brothers of Italy	—N/a	—N/a	Alan Fabbri
Five Star Movement		6.0	2	Giulia Gibertoni
The Other Emilia-Romagna (incl. PRC and PdCI)		2.8	1	Maria Cristina Quintavalla
Popular Emilia-Romagna (incl. NCD and UDC)		—N/a	—N/a	Alessandro Rondoni

== Results ==
Seats distribution by constituency.

23 November 2014 Emilia-Romagna regional election results
Candidates	Votes	%	Seats	Parties	Votes	%	Seats
Stefano Bonaccini	615,723	49.05	1				
Stefano Bonaccini	615,723	49.05	1	Democratic Party	535,109	44.52	29
Stefano Bonaccini	615,723	49.05	1	Left Ecology Freedom	38,845	3.23	2
Stefano Bonaccini	615,723	49.05	1	Civic Emilia-Romagna	17,984	1.49	–
Stefano Bonaccini	615,723	49.05	1	Democratic Centre – Solidary Democracy	5,247	0.43	–
Stefano Bonaccini	615,723	49.05	1	Total	597,185	49.69	31
Alan Fabbri	374,736	29.85	1				
Alan Fabbri	374,736	29.85	1	Northern League Emilia-Romagna	233,439	19.42	8
Alan Fabbri	374,736	29.85	1	Forza Italia	100,478	8.36	2
Alan Fabbri	374,736	29.85	1	Brothers of Italy	23,052	1.91	1
Alan Fabbri	374,736	29.85	1	Total	356,969	29.70	11
Giulia Gibertoni	167,022	13.31	–	Five Star Movement	159,456	13.26	5
Maria Cristina Quintavalla	50,211	4.00	–	The Other Emilia-Romagna	44,676	3.71	1
Alessandro Rondoni	33,437	2.66	–	Popular Emilia-Romagna	31,635	2.63	–
Maurizio Mazzanti	14,129	1.13	–	Free Citizens for Emilia-Romagna	11,864	0.98	–
Total candidates	1,255,258	100.00	2	Total parties	1,201,785	100.00	48
Source: Ministry of the Interior – Historical Archive of Elections

Popular vote
PD	44.52%
LN	19.42%
M5S	13.26%
FI	8.36%
PRC–PdCI	3.71%
SEL	3.23%
ERP	2.63%
Others	4.81%

President
Bonaccini	49.05%
Fabbri	29.85%
Gibertoni	13.30%
Quintavalla	4.00%
Rondoni	2.66%
Mazzanti	1.12%

Seats summary
CSX	64.00%
CDX	24.00%
M5S	10.00%
LER	2.00%
