= Stefano Bonaccini =

Italian politician (born 1967)

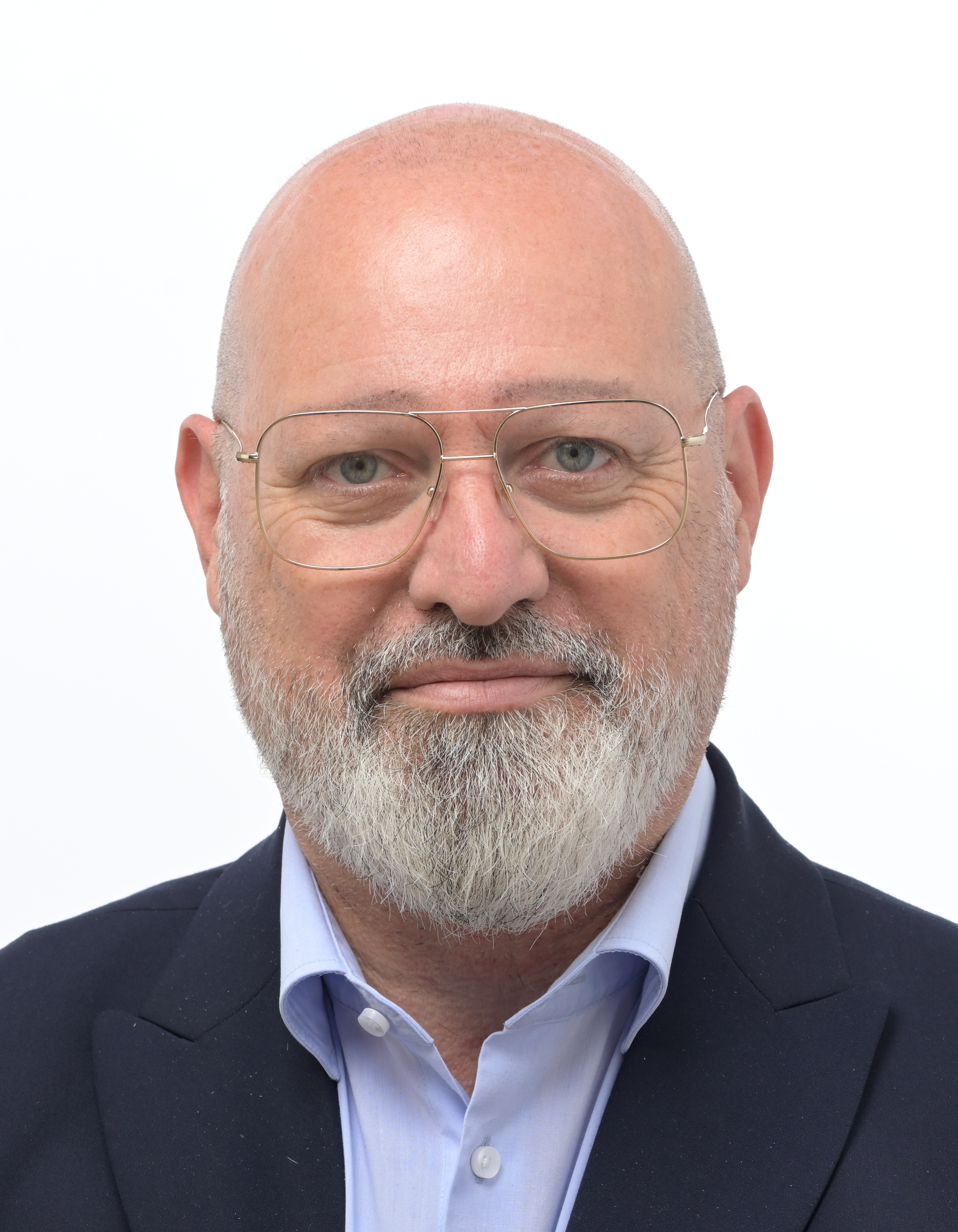
- Official portrait, 2024

Member of the European Parliament
- Incumbent
- Assumed office 16 July 2024
- Constituency: North-East Italy

9th President of Emilia-Romagna
- In office 24 November 2014 – 12 July 2024
- Preceded by: Vasco Errani
- Succeeded by: Michele De Pascale

President of the Democratic Party
- Incumbent
- Assumed office 12 March 2023
- Preceded by: Valentina Cuppi

President of the Conference of the Regions and Autonomous Provinces
- In office 17 December 2015 – 9 April 2021
- Deputy: Giovanni Toti
- Preceded by: Sergio Chiamparino
- Succeeded by: Massimiliano Fedriga

Personal details
- Born: 1 January 1967 (age 59) Modena, Italy
- Party: PCI (until 1991); PDS (1991–1998); DS (1998–2007); PD (since 2007)
- Spouse: Sandra Notari
- Children: 2

Stefano Bonaccini (Italian pronunciation: [ˈsteːfano bonatˈtʃiːni]; born 1 January 1967) is an Italian politician and member of the Democratic Party (PD), of which he is serving as president since 12 March 2023. In 2024, he was elected to the European Parliament to represent North-East Italy.

For nearly ten years, from November 2014 to July 2024, Bonaccini served as the President of Emilia-Romagna. He resigned from the role to become an MEP.

Bonaccini started his political career in the Italian Communist Party (PCI) and followed that party's transition toward social democracy, becoming one of the main representatives of the PD's reformist or moderate wing.

== Early political career ==
Stefano Bonaccini was born in Campogalliano, near Modena, on 1 January 1967, in a lower middle-class family. His father was a truck driver, while his mother worked in a factory.

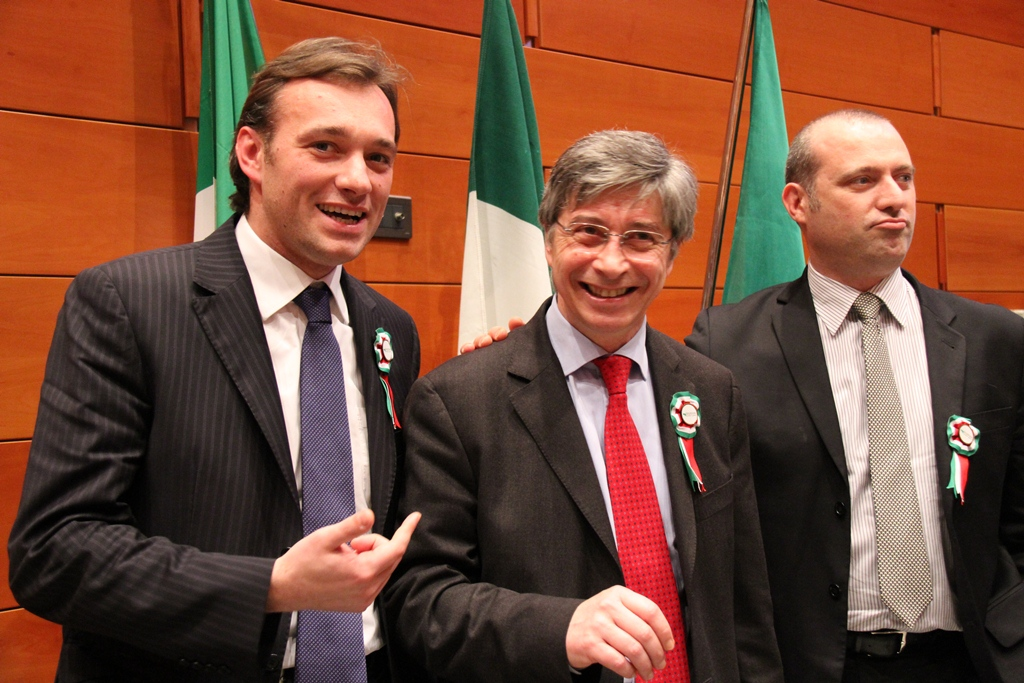
Bonaccini with Matteo Richetti and Vasco Errani in 2011

After attending the scientific lyceum, he started his political career during the 1980s, as a member of the peace movements. Contextually, he joined the Italian Communist Party (PCI), for which he became municipal assessor in the town of Campogaliano, where he lived. The PCI was transformed into the Democratic Party of the Left (PDS) and, in 1993, Bonaccini became provincial secretary of the Left Youth (SG), the PDS youth-wing. Two years later, in 1995, he was elected provincial secretary of the PDS of Modena. In 1998, he joined the newly formed Democrats of the Left (DS). From 1999 to 2006, he served as Modena's municipal assessor for public works, cultural heritage and historical city centre.

In 2007, he was appointed the provincial secretary of the Democratic Party (PD), the new centre-left party formed by the union between DS and the Christian centrist party, The Daisy (DL). Two years later he was elected regional secretary of the PD for Emilia-Romagna.

After the 2010 regional election, Bonaccini was elected regional councillor for the Democratic Party. During the legislature he became one of the closer advisors of incumbent governor Vasco Errani, who was ruling the region since 1999. During these years, Bonaccini was widely considered as one of Errani's most probable successors. On 13 December 2013, he was appointed national coordinator for "Local Authorities" in the national secretariat of the PD, under the leadership of Matteo Renzi, who Bonaccini supported in the 2013 primary election.

== President of Emilia-Romagna (2014–2024) ==
After the resignation of Emilia-Romagna's long-time President Errani, Bonaccini emerged as the most probable candidate for the presidency. However, he was initially challenged by the President of the Regional Council, Matteo Richetti. In September 2014, they were both under investigation for embezzlement. Richetti withdrew his candidacy, while Bonaccini decided to continue his campaign. The two politicians would be later acquitted from all charges.

On 28 September, Bonaccini won the centre-left primary election to become the presidential candidate for the Democratic Party, with 60.9% of the votes against the former mayor of Forlì, Roberto Balzani.

=== First term ===
On 23 November 2014, he won the regional election in Emilia-Romagna with 49.1% of the votes, defeating the centre-right candidate Alan Fabbri and becoming the 9th President of the region.

On 20 July 2015, Bonaccini signed so-called the "Pact for Labour", a deal between regional government, trade unions and entrepreneurs, to relaunch employment in the region. The Pact allocated, in almost five years, more than 22 billion euros.

On 17 December 2015, Bonaccini was elected President of the Conference of the Regions and Autonomous Provinces, replacing Piedmontese President Sergio Chiamparino, who resigned a few weeks before. While on 12 December 2016, he was elected president of the Council of European Municipalities and Regions (CEMR), the largest organisation of local and regional governments in Europe.

Since 2014, the regional government cut the waiting lists for patients and exams in health and opened many "health houses" for proximity medicine. Moreover, Emilia-Romagna was the first region in Italy to abolish the so-called superticket and started a drastic reduction of the fees for the nests.

In 2017 and 2018, Bonaccini's government implemented a policy aimed to increase the political and fiscal autonomy of Emilia-Romagna. Bonaccini stated: "We have activated the path towards a greater regional autonomy to better face the challenges of change. We want an autonomy that respects the Constitution, national unity and solidarity between territories, which are principles that are absolutely inviolable for us, but capable of improving relations between central administration and local autonomies. Above all, we need an autonomy to strengthen investment planning, to streamline and simplify procedures, to make our services for citizens and businesses even more efficient and effective."

During his first term, Emilia-Romagna lived a period of economic prosperity. Unemployment went down from 9% in 2014, to 4.8% in 2019, while the employment rate rose to 71%, the highest in the country. The region was also the first one in Italy for GDP growth from 2014 to 2019 and the first region for export "per capita".

=== 2020 regional election ===
Despite Emilia-Romagna having always been considered one of the "red regions" – a stronghold of left-wing parties since the end of the World War II – due to the right-wing surge in the country, the 2020 regional election was considered as the first competitive one in the history of the region. Bonaccini was confirmed the centre-left candidate at the head of a coalition including the PD and its left-wing allies of Free and Equal (LeU) and Green Europe (EV), as well as More Europe (+Eu). Bonaccini also launched a personal civic list, named "Bonaccini for President", which included, among others, members from Matteo Renzi's Italia Viva (IV), Carlo Calenda's Action and Federico Pizzarotti's Italia in Comune (IiC).

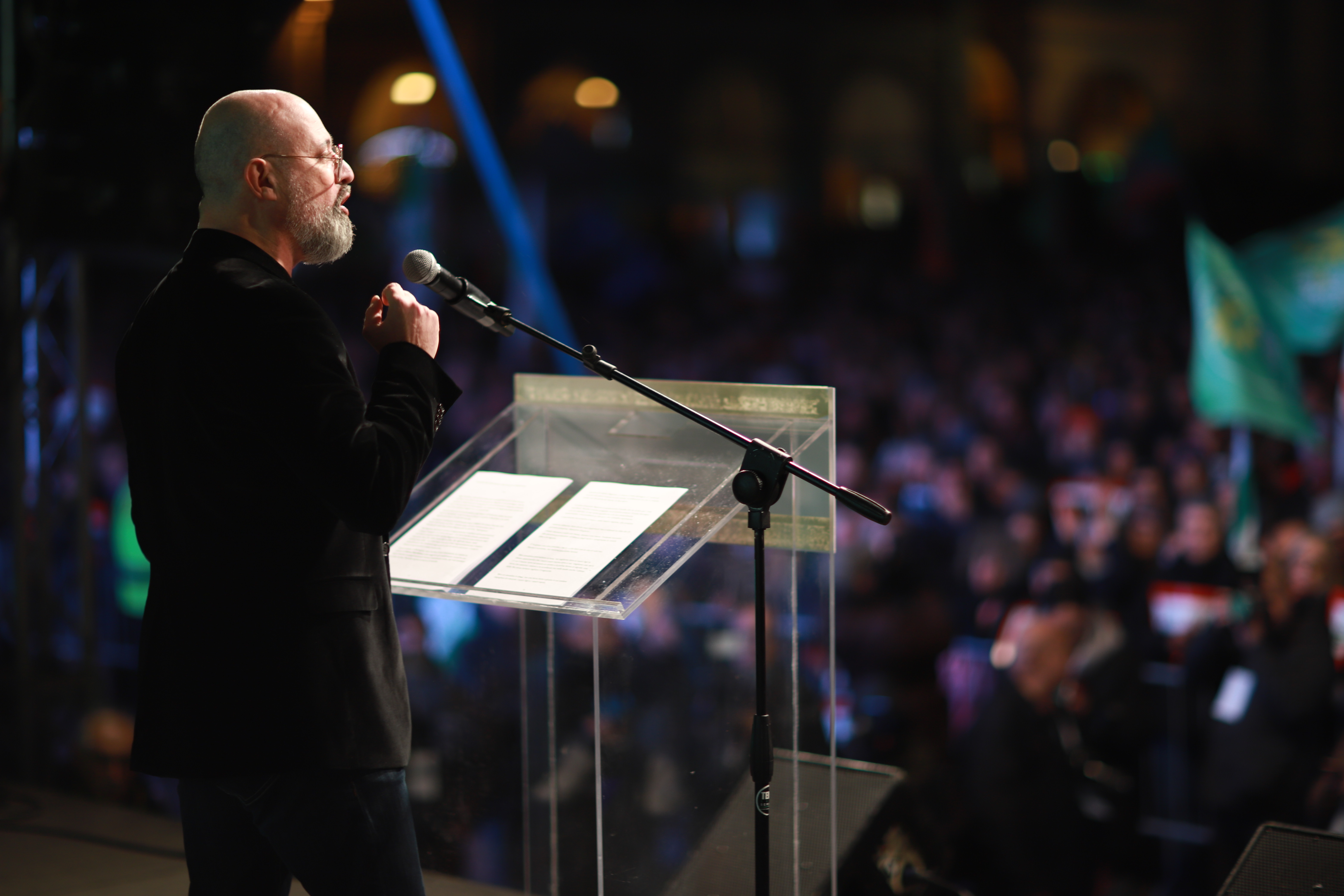
Bonaccini during a rally in Bologna on 7 December 2019

The centre-right proposed Senator Lucia Borgonzoni, member of the League (Lega) and former undersecretary to cultural activities in Giuseppe Conte's first government. The centre-right coalition included also Brothers of Italy (FdI), Forza Italia (FI) and Cambiamo! (C!).

During the campaign, Bonaccini claimed the results achieved by his administration (including the "Pact for Labour" of 2015), and proposed four priority points summed up into the slogan "A step forward": to create free kindergartens for all children in the region, to break down the waiting lists for health interventions and access times to first aid, to carry out preventive maintenance and safety of the regional territory, and to reduce the phenomenon of NEET.

The electoral campaign was characterized by a massive presence of the League's leader, Matteo Salvini, who aimed to win in Emilia-Romagna to tear down the government. However, his campaign led to the birth of the Sardines movement, a grassroots political movement, which organized a series of peaceful demonstrations to protest against the right-wing surge in the country and, more specifically, against the political rhetoric of Salvini.

On 26 January, Bonaccini was re-elected to a second term, with more than 51% of votes, against 43% of Borgonzoni. The centre-left alliance scored particularly well in Bologna, Modena, Reggio Emilia and Ravenna, where Bonaccini approached or even overcame the 60% of votes.

=== COVID-19 pandemic ===
In March 2020, Italy was severely hit by the coronavirus pandemic and Emilia-Romagna became one of the most affected regions. As of March 2021, Emilia-Romagna had more than 276,000 cases and 10,000 deaths were confirmed.

On 4 March, when Emilia-Romagna's regional minister of health, Raffaele Donini, was declared positive for COVID-19, Governor Bonaccini appointed Sergio Venturi as Extraordinary Commissioner for the emergency. Venturi served as regional minister oh health from 2014 to 2020.

On 9 March 2020, the government of Italy under Prime Minister Giuseppe Conte imposed a national quarantine, restricting the movement of the population except for necessity, work, and health circumstances in the whole country. On 16 March, Bonaccini imposed a strengthened quarantine on the municipality of Medicina, near Bologna, since it had developed an intense outbreak. People were not allowed to enter or exit the town for any reason. While on 21 March, he closed supermarkets during the weekends. On 18 May, the lockdown officially ended.

On 1 November 2020, Bonaccini tested positive for COVID-19, amid a pandemic resurgence in the country. On 13 November, he was hospitalized with a bilateral pneumonia and discharged after a few days.

In March 2021, when his region was heavily hit by a third wave of the pandemic, Bonaccini imposed red zones in the provinces of Bologna, Modena and in many municipalities through Romagna.

=== 2023 Democratic Party leadership run and party presidency ===
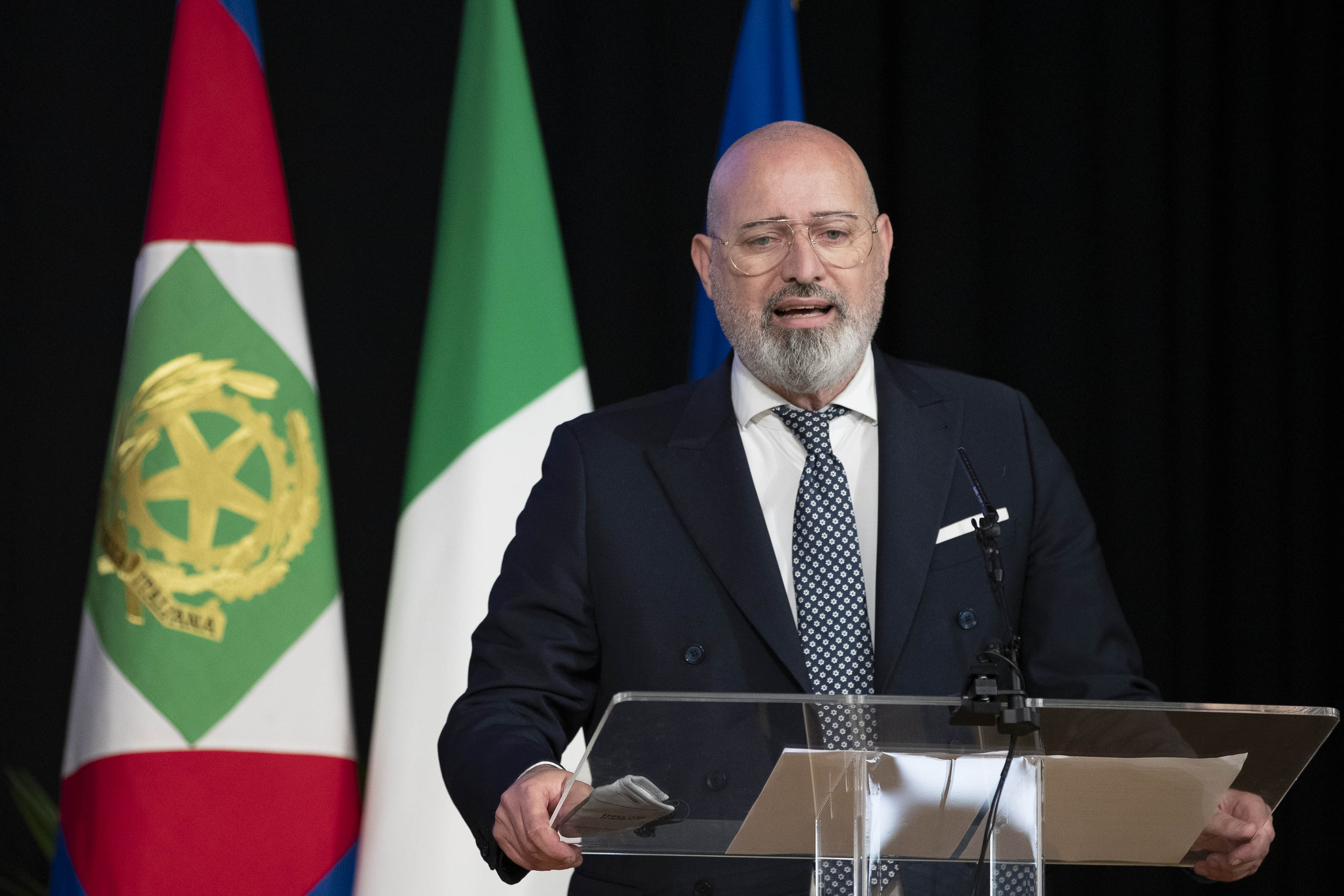
Stefano Bonaccini in 2022

Following the resignation of Enrico Letta as secretary of the Democratic Party after the 2022 Italian general election, Bonaccini was immediately touted as a potential candidate for the party leadership. On 20 November 2022, Bonaccini formally announced his candidacy as leader of the Democratic Party. In the 2023 PD leadership election, Bonaccini won the first round, achieving 52.87% among party members, but eventually lost to his former deputy Elly Schlein in the open primary election on 26 February 2023. He was successively named as the new party president on 12 March 2023, following an agreement between him and Schlein.

On 21 and 22 July, during a two-days convention in Cesena, Bonaccini launched his own political faction, named People's Energy, from the slogan chosen for the leadership election.

=== 2023 Emilia-Romagna floods ===
As a president, Bonaccini had to face one of the deadliest natural events which ever affected the region. In May 2023, a series of floods hit in and around the cities of Bologna, Cesena, Forlì, Faenza, Ravenna, and Rimini. The first floods occurred between 2 and 3 May 2023, killing two people. More severe floods took place on 16–17 May 2023, killing at least 15 people and displacing 50,000 others. The same amount of rain which usually falls in seven months fell in two weeks, causing the overflow of twenty-three rivers across the region. In some areas, almost half the annual average of rain fell in only 36 hours. Moreover, 400 landslides occurred in the area and 43 cities and towns were flooded. The provisional cost of the damage caused by the floods amounts to more than €10 billion (US$11 billion).

Bonaccini's request to be named extraordinary commissioner to manage the relief funds, as was custom among regional presidents in Italy, was opposed by the Meloni government, in particular by Brothers of Italy and Lega; some regional presidents of the centre-right coalition, such as Roberto Occhiuto, Giovanni Toti, and Luca Zaia, sided with Bonaccini. On 7 June, Meloni hosted a meeting with Bonaccini and other administrators from the affected areas, stating that the emergency would be temporarily managed by an operative table between the national government and local institutions led by Nello Musumeci, the Minister for Civil Protection and Maritime Policies. After weeks of tension within the government and between majority and opposition parties, the Meloni cabinet officially appointed army corps general Francesco Paolo Figliuolo as Extraordinary Commissioner for the Reconstruction on 27 June 2023.

== European Parliament (2024–present) ==
In 2024, Bonaccini ran in the European Parliament election as PD's top candidate in the North East Italy constituency. He was elected with 390,400 votes, coming second after Prime Minister Meloni on the FdI list. On 26 June, he announced that he will resign from his post as Emilia-Romagna regional president following the G7 ministers' meeting on science and technology in Bologna and Forlì on 9–11 July, right before the new European Parliament starts working on 16 July. After his resignation, Vice President Irene Priolo acceded to the office as a caretaker and new regional elections would be held on 17 November.

== Personal life ==
Bonaccini is married to Sandra Notari, a small business owner from Modena. They met the first time during a meeting between Modena's city council, of which Bonaccini served as assessor, and local business owners. The couple has two daughters, Maria Vittoria and Virginia. On 2 October 2023, Maria Vittoria had a daughter, Carolina, thus Bonaccini became grandfather at the age of 56.

Until 39 years old, Bonaccini played as a forward in many local football teams. He is an avid supporter of Juventus FC and Modena Volley.

== Electoral history ==
Election	House	Constituency	Party	Votes	Result
2024	European Parliament	North-East Italy	PD	390,400	Elected

2014 Emilia-Romagna regional election
Candidate	Party	Coalition	Votes	%
Stefano Bonaccini	PD	Centre-left coalition	615,723	49.0
Alan Fabbri	LN	Centre-right coalition	374,736	30.0
Giulia Gibertoni	M5S		167,022	13.3
Others			97,777	7.7
Total			1,255,258	100.0

2020 Emilia-Romagna regional election
Candidate	Party	Coalition	Votes	%
Stefano Bonaccini	PD	Centre-left coalition	1,195,742	51.4
Lucia Borgonzoni	Lega	Centre-right coalition	1,014,672	43.6
Others			115,083	5.0
Total			2,325,497	100.0
