= Pact of Democrats =

The Pact of Democrats (Italian: Patto dei Democratici) was a short-lived electoral alliance of political parties in Italy.

It was launched for the 1995 regional elections by the Segni Pact, the Italian Socialists and Democratic Alliance. After the election, in which the Pact of Democrats scored everywhere between 3 and 6%, with the exception of Abruzzo (6.7%) and tiny Molise (9.2%), the alliance was disbanded.

In the 1996 general election the list was succeeded by Italian Renewal (Segni Pact, Italian Socialists, others) and the Democratic Union (Democratic Alliance, others).
