= 1985 Emilia-Romagna regional election =

The Emilia-Romagna regional election of 1985 took place on 12 May 1985.

The Italian Communist Party was by far the largest party, with almost twice the votes of Christian Democracy. After the election Lanfranco Turci, the incumbent Communist President of the Region, formed a new government with the support of the Italian Socialist Party. Turci, elected senator, was replaced by Luciano Guerzoni in 1987.

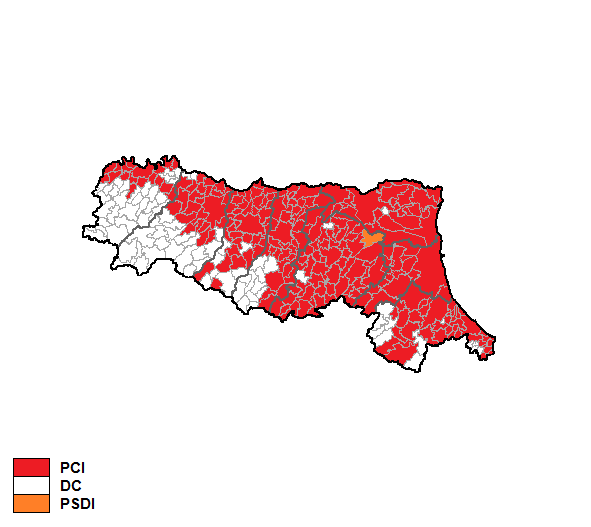
Largest party by municipality

== Results ==
Parties	Votes	%	Seats
Italian Communist Party	1,382,913	47.0	26
Christian Democracy	722,286	24.6	13
Italian Socialist Party	320,809	10.9	4
Italian Republican Party	138,030	4.7	2
Italian Social Movement	125,346	4.3	2
Italian Democratic Socialist Party	78,651	2.7	1
Green List	67,109	2.3	1
Italian Liberal Party	47,092	1.6	1
Proletarian Democracy	33,190	1.1	–
Pensioners' Italian Alliance – Venetian League	11,564	0.4	–
Pensioners' Italian Alliance	5,634	02	–
Valdostan Union – Democratic Party – others	4,815	0.2	–
Pensioners' National Party	2,261	0.1	–
Total	2,939,700	100.0	50
Source: Ministry of the Interior
