= 1970 Emilia-Romagna regional election =

The Emilia-Romagna regional election of 1970 took place on 7–8 June 1970.

The Italian Communist Party was by far the largest party and, after the election, Communist Guido Fanti formed a government with the support of the Italian Socialist Party.

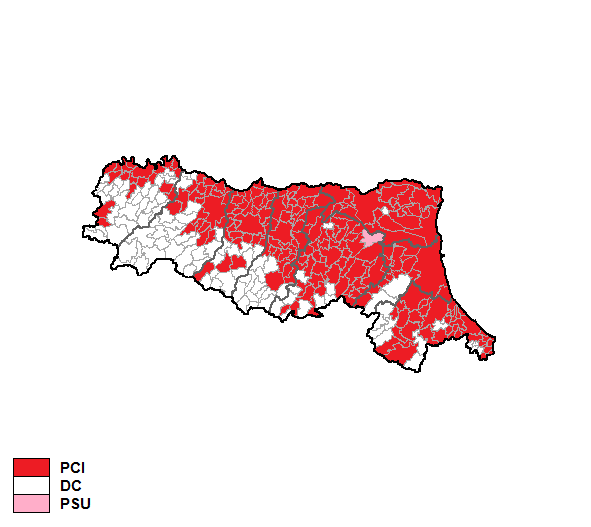
Largest party by municipality

== Results ==
7 June 1970 Emilia-Romagna regional election results
| Parties | Votes | % | Seats |
|---|---|---|---|
| Italian Communist Party | 1,148,643 | 43.99 | 24 |
| Christian Democracy | 672,755 | 25.76 | 14 |
| Italian Socialist Party | 210,369 | 8.06 | 3 |
| Unitary Socialist Party | 195,925 | 7.50 | 3 |
| Italian Republican Party | 103,393 | 3.96 | 2 |
| Italian Socialist Party of Proletarian Unity | 99,993 | 3.83 | 2 |
| Italian Liberal Party | 97,662 | 3.74 | 1 |
| Italian Social Movement | 77,366 | 2.96 | 1 |
| Italian Democratic Party of Monarchist Unity | 5,069 | 0.19 | – |
| Total | 2,611,175 | 100.0 | 50 |
| Invalid/blank votes | 86,134 | | |
| Registered voters | 2,697,309 | 96.59 | |
Source: Ministry of the Interior

Popular vote
| PCI | 43.99% |
| DC | 25.76% |
| PSI | 8.06% |
| PSDI | 7.50% |
| PRI | 3.96% |
| PSIUP | 3.83% |
| PLI | 3.74% |
| MSI | 2.96% |
| PIDUM | 0.19% |
