= 1975 Emilia-Romagna regional election =

The Emilia-Romagna regional election of 1975 took place on 15 June 1975.

The Italian Communist Party was by far the largest party, with almost two times the votes of Christian Democracy. After the election Guido Fanti, the incumbent Communist President of the Region, formed a new government with the support of the Italian Socialist Party. In 1976 Fanti was replaced by Sergio Cavina, to whom Lanfranco Turci succeeded in 1978.

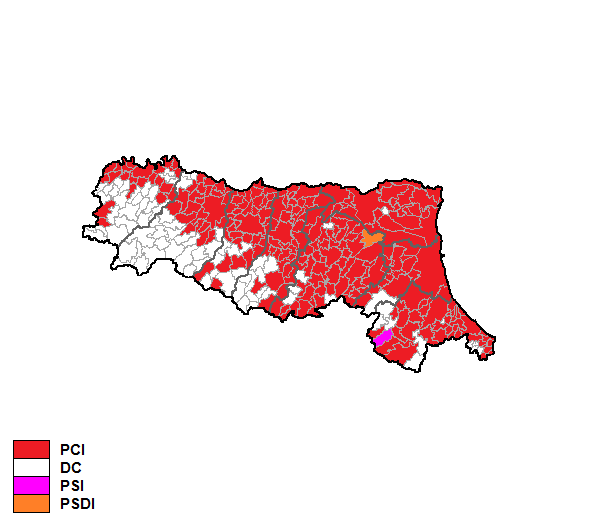
Largest party by municipality

== Results ==
Parties	Votes	%	Seats
Italian Communist Party	1,363,477	48.3	26
Christian Democracy	713,036	25.3	13
Italian Socialist Party	288,928	10.2	4
Italian Democratic Socialist Party	146,492	5.2	2
Italian Republican Party	109,941	3.9	2
Italian Social Movement	103,810	3.7	1
Italian Liberal Party	52,187	1.9	1
Proletarian Unity Party	45,651	1.6	1
Total	2,823,522	100.0	50
Source: Ministry of the Interior
