= 1980 Emilia-Romagna regional election =

The Emilia-Romagna regional election of 1980 took place on 8 June 1980.

The Italian Communist Party was by far the largest party, with almost two times the votes of Christian Democracy. After the election Lanfranco Turci, the incumbent Communist President of the Region, formed a new government with the support of the Italian Socialist Party.

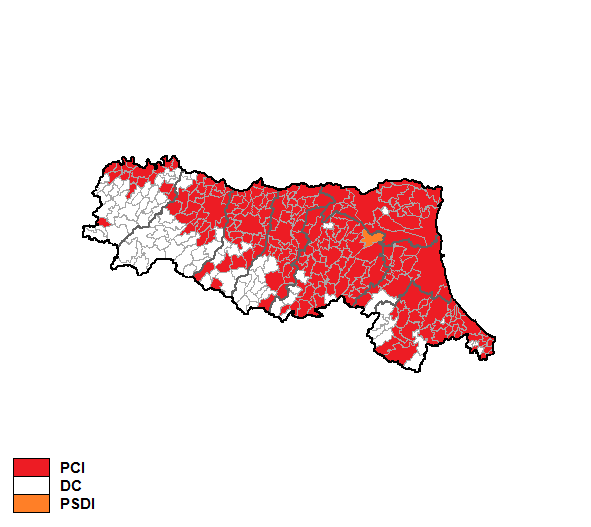
Largest party by municipality

== Results ==
Parties	Votes	%	Seats
Italian Communist Party	1,359,255	48.2	26
Christian Democracy	722,614	25.6	13
Italian Socialist Party	290,981	10.3	4
Italian Democratic Socialist Party	133,238	4.7	2
Italian Republican Party	122,919	4.4	2
Italian Social Movement	89,734	3.2	1
Italian Liberal Party	59,802	2.1	1
Proletarian Unity Party	40,039	1.4	1
Democratic Party – List for Trieste	2,396	0.1	–
Total	2,820,978	100.0	50
Source: Ministry of the Interior
