= 1990 Emilia-Romagna regional election =

The Emilia-Romagna regional election of 1990 took place on 6 and 7 May 1990.

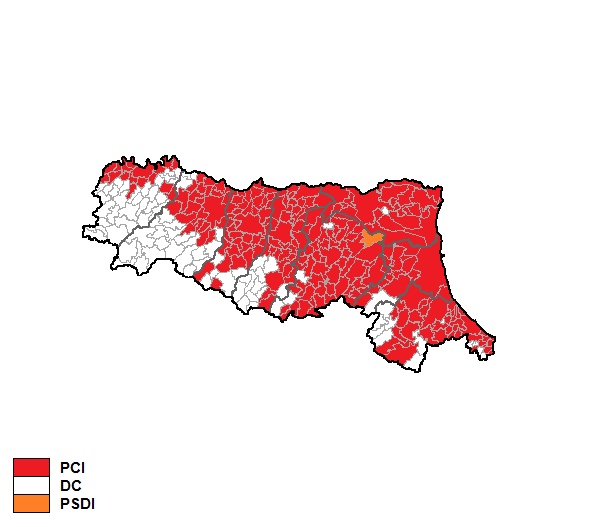
Largest party by municipality

== Events ==
The Italian Communist Party was by far the largest party.

After the election Enrico Boselli, regional leader of the Italian Socialist Party, formed a government comprising the Communists and the Italian Democratic Socialist Party.

In 1994 Boselli, who had been elected to the Parliament of Italy, was replaced by Pier Luigi Bersani of the Democratic Party of the Left, the successor party of the Communists.

== Results ==
Parties	Votes	%	Seats
Italian Communist Party	1,231,631	42.06	23
Christian Democracy	683,979	23.36	13
Italian Socialist Party	362,319	12.37	6
Italian Republican Party	140,044	4.78	2
Green List	97,676	3.34	1
Italian Social Movement	88,718	3.03	1
Northern League Emilia-Romagna	85,379	2.92	1
Italian Democratic Socialist Party	55,244	1.89	1
Rainbow Greens	46,770	1.60	1
Italian Liberal Party	42,916	1.47	1
Antiprohibitionists on Drugs	30,365	1.04	–
Proletarian Democracy	24,146	0.82	–
Hunting Fishing Environment	20,540	0.70	–
Pensioners' List	12,764	0.44	–
Ecological List	5,705	0.19	
Total	2,928,196	100.0	50
Source: Ministry of the Interior
