= Vasco Errani =

Italian politician (born 1955)

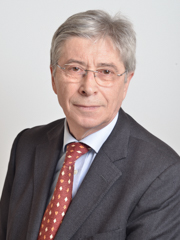

Member of the Senate of the Republic
- In office 23 March 2018 – 13 October 2022
- Constituency: Emilia-Romagna

8th President of Emilia-Romagna
- In office 3 March 1999 – 8 July 2014
- Preceded by: Antonio La Forgia
- Succeeded by: Stefano Bonaccini

President of the Conference of the Regions and Autonomous Provinces
- In office 13 May 2005 – 31 July 2014
- Preceded by: Enzo Ghigo
- Succeeded by: Sergio Chiamparino

Personal details
- Born: 17 May 1955 (age 71) Massa Lombarda, Italy
- Party: PCI (1970–1991); PDS (1991–1998); DS (1998–2007); PD (2007–2017); Art.1 (2017–2023)
- Education: University of Bologna
- Profession: Politician

Vasco Errani (born 17 May 1955) is an Italian politician. He was a founding member of the Democratic Party (PD), which he has left on 22 February 2017, to join Article 1 – Democratic and Progressive Movement, a party founded by the former PD left-wing minority. He has been President of Emilia-Romagna from 1999 to 2014, being the longest-serving one of all time. Errani is one of the longest-serving governors in the history of the Italian Republic.

== Early political career ==
Errani started his political career in Ravenna in the late 1970s by joining the Italian Communist Party (PCI), which evolved as the Democratic Party of the Left (PDS) in 1991 and the Democrats of the Left (DS) in 1998. In this capacity he was municipal councillor in Ravenna from 1983 through 1995, when he was first elected to the Legislative Assembly of Emilia-Romagna and co-opted in the Regional Government as under-secretary to the Presidency. In 1997 he was appointed regional minister of Tourism.

== President of Emilia-Romagna ==
On 3 March 1999, he was elected President of the Region by the Legislative Assembly.

In 2000, when the first direct election took place, Errani was overwhelmingly elected president with 56.5% of the vote. In 2005 he was re-elected by a landslide 62.7% of the vote against the 35.2% of his closest opponent.

In 2010 Errani was elected president for a third consecutive time, but with a slimmer share of 52.1%.

Errani was chosen as president of the State–Regions Conference by fellow presidents in 2005, after having been its deputy in 2000–2005. In the 2010 regional elections the centre-left lost its majority in the Conference and Roberto Formigoni, longtime President of Lombardy, claimed the post. However, Errani was re-elected thanks to the decisive support of Lega Nord.

On 8 July 2014 Errani resigned as President of Emilia-Romagna after he was investigated for the Terremerse scandal. Errani was fully cleared from the charges in July 2016.

== Special Commissioner for the earthquakes ==
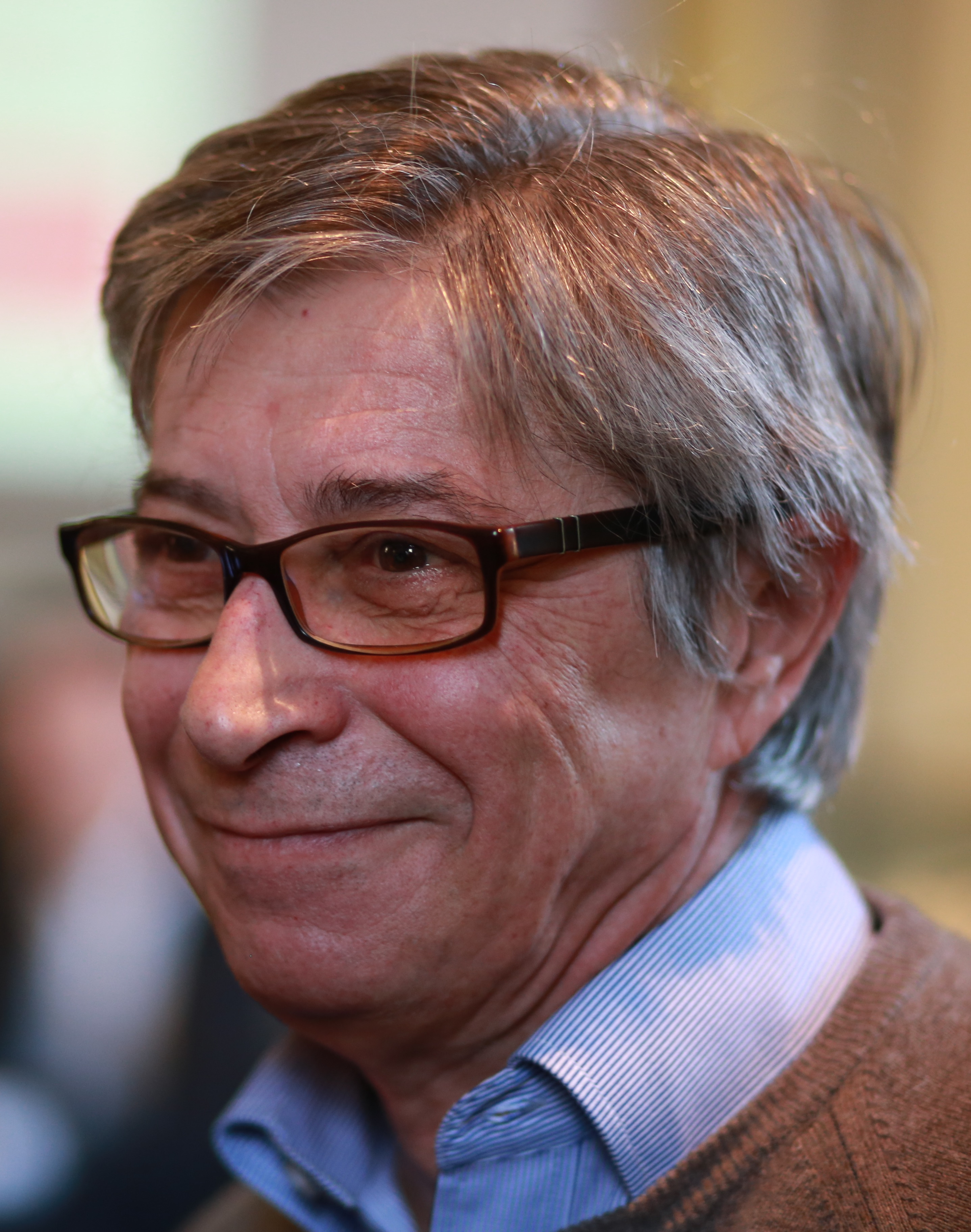
Vasco Errani in 2015.

=== 2012 Emilia earthquakes ===
In May 2012, two major earthquakes occurred in Emilia-Romagna, causing 27 deaths and widespread damage. Errani was nominated Special Commissioner for the reconstruction, by the Prime Minister Monti and the chief the Protezione Civile Franco Gabrielli.

=== 2016 Central Italy earthquakes ===
On 24 August 2016, an earthquake measuring 6.2 on the moment magnitude scale struck Central Italy. The epicentre was close to Accumoli, in an area near the borders of the Umbria, Lazio, Abruzzo and Marche regions. The earthquake killed 299 people and left more than 4,500 homeless.

On 1 September, Prime Minister Matteo Renzi appointed Errani as Special Commissioner for reconstruction.

== Legal problems ==
In 2012, Vasco Errani was placed under investigation, because the cooperative "Terremerse", owned by his brother, had received a loan of €1 million, out of public funds controlled by the Regional administration of Emilia-Romagna, for the construction of a factory farm. Errani found himself under investigation for fraudulent misrepresentation, based on suspicion of his having provided misleading information to the investigating magistrate.

On 8 November 2012 Errani and his fellow accused were acquitted because the facts were not those alleged by the prosecutor ("... perché il fatto non sussiste").

The Bologna public prosecutor's office nevertheless lodged a successful appeal, and 8 July 2014 Errani was sentenced to one year of imprisonment by the Court of Appeal together with regional officials Terzini and Mazzotti, who were sentenced to one year and two months. Following this Errani immediately resigned as president of the region and lodged an appeal against this latest appeal court decision. On 21 June 2016 he was definitively acquitted by the Court of Appeal of Bologna.
