= Primary elections in Italy =

Primary elections were first introduced in Italy by Lega Nord in 1995, but were seldom used until before the 2005 regional elections.

In January 2005 the centre-left The Union coalition held open primaries in order to select its candidate for President in Apulia. More importantly, in October 2005, The Union asked its voters to choose the candidate for Prime Minister in the 2006 general election: 4.3 million voters showed up delivering Romano Prodi a clear victory. Two years later, in October 2007: 3.5 million voters of the Democratic Party were called to elect Walter Veltroni as their first leader, the party's constituent assembly and regional leaders.

The centre-right (see House of Freedoms, The People of Freedom, centre-right coalition and Forza Italia) has held primary elections only at the local level.

== Regulatory rules ==
There are no laws at country level to govern the conduct of any primary election.

In 2004 Tuscany introduced a regional law regulating primaries, but parties are not mandated to hold primaries. As of today, these rules were used in occasion of the 2005 regional election by the Democrats of the Left and Future Tuscany, and in the 2010 regional election by the Democratic Party and Left Ecology Freedom.

== List of primary elections ==
The list includes the results of (open) primary elections for prime minister, president of region, mayor of a city with 150,000 inhabitants and leader of major party. All the following primaries were funded and ran by parties, with the sole exception of those for the Regional Council of Tuscany.

Highlighted rows denote country-level primary elections.
O : Open primary
C: Closed primary

=== 2000s ===
Primary date(s)	O / C	Party/Coalition	Position(s)	Winner	Article
16 January 2005		The Union	President of Apulia	Nichi Vendola	
16 October 2005	O	The Union	Prime Minister of Italy	Romano Prodi	link
4 December 2005		The Union	President of Sicily	Rita Borsellino	
29 January 2005		The Union	Mayor of Milan	Bruno Ferrante	
4 February 2007		The Union	Mayor of Genoa	Marta Vincenzi	
4 February 2007		The Union	Mayor of Palermo	Leoluca Orlando	
14 October 2007	O	Democratic Party	Party leader	Walter Veltroni	link
14 December 2008		Democratic Party and allies	Mayor of Bologna	Flavio Delbono	
14 February 2009		Democratic Party and allies	Mayor of Florence	Matteo Renzi	
25 October 2009	O	Democratic Party	Party leader	Pier Luigi Bersani	link

=== 2010s ===
Primary date(s)	O / C	Party/Coalition	Position(s)	Winner	Article
24 January 2010		Democratic Party and allies	President of Apulia	Nichi Vendola	
24 January 2010		Democratic Party and allies	Mayor of Venice	Giorgio Orsoni	
7 February 2010		Democratic Party and allies	President of Umbria	Catiuscia Marini	
14 February 2010		Democratic Party and allies	President of Calabria	Agazio Loiero	
14 November 2010		Democratic Party and allies	Mayor of Milan	Giuliano Pisapia	link
12 December 2010		Democratic Party and allies	Mayor of Trieste	Roberto Cosolini	
23 January 2011		Democratic Party and allies	Mayor of Bologna	Virginio Merola	
23 January 2011		Democratic Party and allies	Mayor of Naples	Andrea Cozzolino (Note: Candidate who was replaced by another candidate without a primary vote in the run-up of the general election.)	
30 January 2011		Democratic Party and allies	Mayor of Cagliari	Massimo Zedda	
27 February 2011		Democratic Party and allies	Mayor of Turin	Piero Fassino	
4 December 2011		Democratic Party and allies	Mayor of Verona	Michele Bertucco	
29 January 2012		Democratic Party and allies	Mayor of Parma	Vincenzo Bernazzoli	
12 February 2012		Democratic Party and allies	Mayor of Genoa	Marco Doria	
4 March 2012		Democratic Party and allies	Mayor of Palermo	Fabrizio Ferrandelli	
25 November 2012	O	Democratic Party and allies	Prime Minister of Italy	Pier Luigi Bersani	link
15 December 2012		Democratic Party and allies	President of Lombardy	Umberto Ambrosoli	
7 April 2013		Democratic Party and allies	Mayor of Rome	Ignazio Marino	
14 April 2013		Democratic Party and allies	Mayor of Brescia	Emilio Del Bono	
13 July 2013		Democratic Party and allies	President of Trentino	Ugo Rossi	
22 September 2013		Democratic Party and allies	President of Basilicata	Marcello Pittella	
29 September 2013		Democratic Party and allies	President of Sardinia	Francesca Barracciu	
8 December 2013	O	Democratic Party	Party leader	Matteo Renzi	link
2 February 2014		Democratic Party and allies	Mayor of Padua	Ivo Rossi	
23 February 2014		Democratic Party and allies	Mayor of Bari	Antonio Decaro	
23 February 2014		Brothers of Italy	Party leader	Giorgia Meloni	
2 March 2014		Democratic Party and allies	Mayor of Modena	Gian Carlo Muzzarelli	
2 March 2014		Democratic Party and allies	Mayor of Reggio Emilia	Luca Vecchi	
9 March 2014		Democratic Party and allies	Mayor of Foggia	Augusto Marasco	
16 March 2014		Democratic Party and allies	Mayor of Livorno	Marco Ruggeri	
23 March 2014		Democratic Party	Mayor of Florence	Dario Nardella	
28 September 2014		Democratic Party	President of Emilia-Romagna	Stefano Bonaccini	
5 October 2014		Democratic Party and allies	President of Calabria	Mario Oliverio	
30 November 2014		Democratic Party and allies	President of Veneto	Alessandra Moretti	
30 November 2014		Democratic Party and allies	President of Apulia	Michele Emiliano	
11 January 2015		Democratic Party and allies	President of Liguria	Raffaella Paita	
1 March 2015		Democratic Party and allies	President of Marche	Luca Ceriscioli	
1 March 2015		Democratic Party and allies	President of Campania	Vincenzo De Luca	
16 March 2015		Democratic Party and allies	Mayor of Venice	Felice Casson	
7 February 2016		Democratic Party and allies	Mayor of Milan	Giuseppe Sala	link
6 March 2016		Democratic Party and allies	Mayor of Naples	Valeria Valente	
6 March 2016		Democratic Party and allies	Mayor of Rome	Roberto Giachetti	
6 March 2016		Democratic Party and allies	Mayor of Trieste	Roberto Cosolini	
5 March 2017		Democratic Party and allies	Mayor of Parma	Paolo Scarpa	
2 April 2017		Democratic Party and allies	Mayor of Verona	Orietta Salemi	
30 April 2017	O	Democratic Party	Party leader	Matteo Renzi	link
14 May 2017	C	Lega Nord	Party leader	Matteo Salvini	
24 February 2019		Centre-right coalition	Mayor of Bari	Pasquale Di Rella	
24 February 2019		Centre-right coalition	Mayor of Foggia	Franco Landella	
3 March 2019	O	Democratic Party	Party leader	Nicola Zingaretti	link

=== 2020s ===
Primary date(s)	O / C	Party/Coalition	Position(s)	Winner	Article
12 January 2020		Democratic Party and allies	President of Apulia	Michele Emiliano	link
12–13 June 2021		Democratic Party and allies	Mayor of Turin	Stefano Lo Russo	link
20 June 2021		Democratic Party and allies	Mayor of Bologna	Matteo Lepore	link
20 June 2021		Democratic Party and allies	Mayor of Rome	Roberto Gualtieri	link
23 July 2022		Democratic Party and allies	President of Sicily	Caterina Chinnici	link
15 March 2023		Democratic Party and allies	Party Leader	Elly Schlein	
16 March 2026		Democratic Party and allies	Mayor of Reggio Calabria	Domenico Battaglia	
