= Mayor of Bologna =

- Sindaco di Bologna

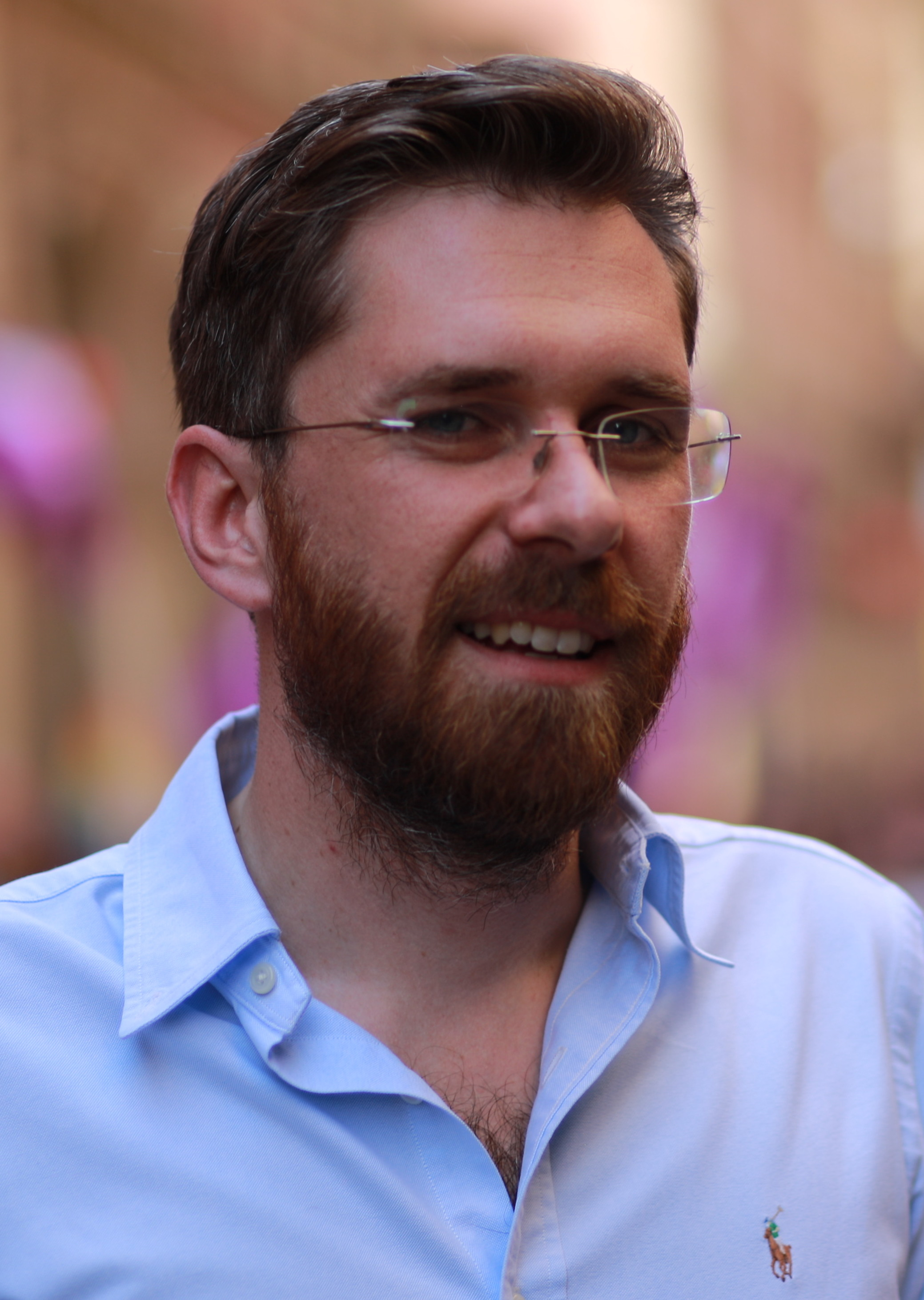
- Incumbent; Matteo Lepore since 11 October 2021
- Style: No courtesy or style
- Seat: Palazzo d'Accursio
- Appointer: Electorate of Bologna
- Term length: 5 years, renewable once
- Inaugural holder: Luigi Pizzardi
- Formation: 6 April 1860
- Deputy: Emily Marion Clancy
- Salary: €114,960 per year
- Website: Official website

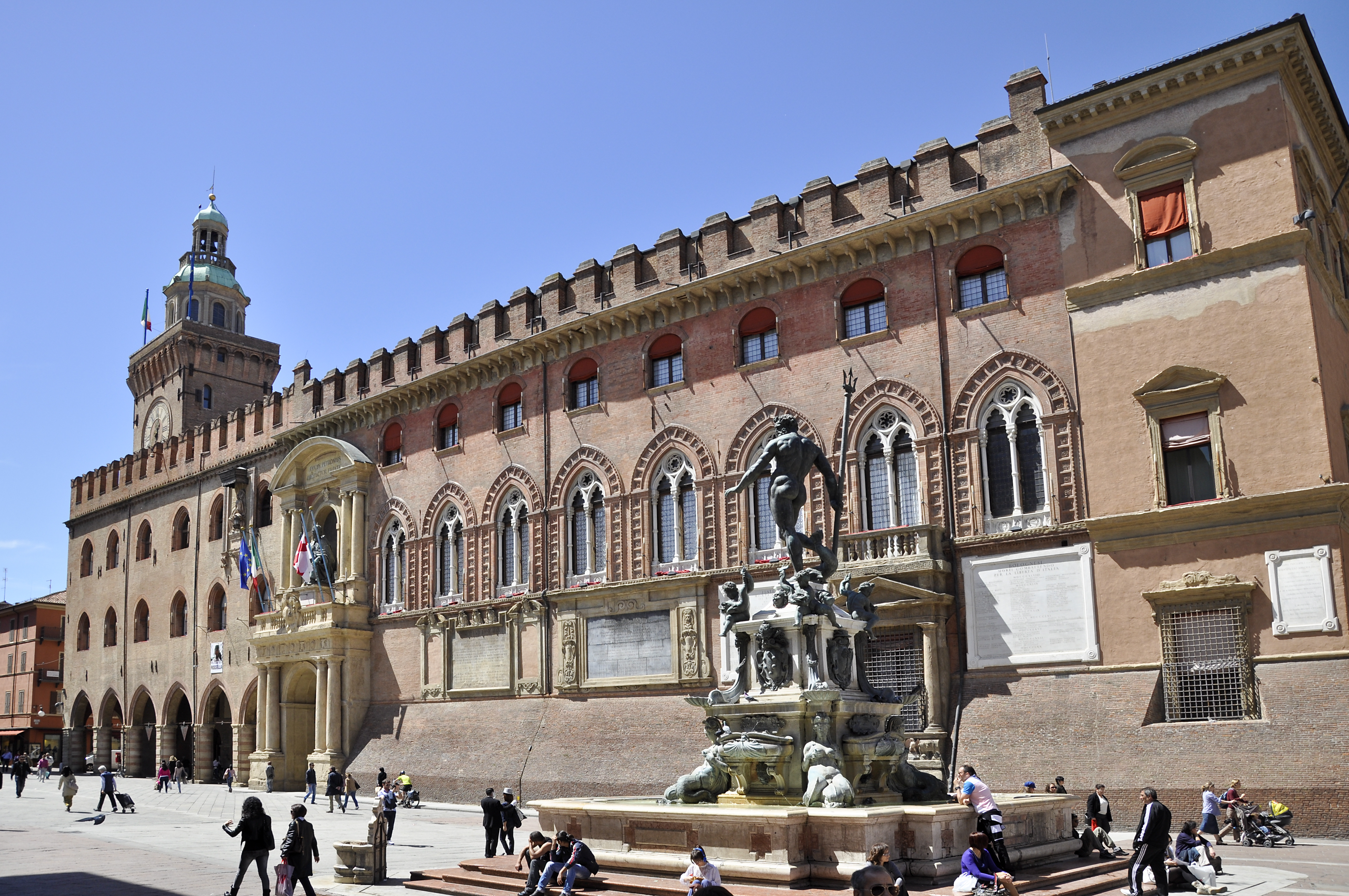
Palazzo d'Accursio is the seat of the mayor.

The mayor of Bologna (Italian: sindaco di Bologna) is an elected politician who, along with the Bologna City Council, is accountable for the strategic government of Bologna, the regional capital of Emilia-Romagna, Italy.

== Overview ==
According to the Italian Constitution, the mayor of Bologna is a member of the City Council. The Mayor is elected by the population of Bologna, who also elects the members of the City Council, the legislative body which checks the mayor's policy guidelines and is able to enforce his resignation by a motion of no confidence. The mayor is entitled to appoint and release the members of his executive. Since 1993, the mayor is elected directly by Bologna's electorate: in all mayoral elections in Italy in cities with a population higher than 15,000 voters express a direct choice for the mayor or an indirect choice voting for the party of the candidate's coalition. If no candidate receives at least 50% of votes, the top two candidates go to a second round after two weeks. The election of the City Council is based on a direct choice for the candidate with a preference vote: the candidate with the majority of the preferences is elected. The number of the seats for each party is determined proportionally on the base of a majority bonus system.

== List of mayors of Bologna ==
=== Kingdom of Italy (1860-1946) ===
In 1860, the nascent Kingdom of Italy created the office of the mayor of Bologna, who was chosen by the city council. In 1926, the Italian fascist dictatorship abolished mayors and city councils, replacing them with an authoritarian Podestà chosen by the National Fascist Party.

	Mayor	Term start	Term end	Party
1	Luigi Pizzardi	6 April 1860	11 January 1862	Right
2	Carlo Pepoli	11 January 1862	7 May 1866	Independent
3	Gioacchino Napoleone Pepoli	7 May 1866	6 April 1870	Left
4	Camillo Casarini	6 April 1870	3 January 1875	Left
5	Gaetano Tacconi	3 January 1875	29 March 1890	Right
6	Carlo Carli	29 March 1890	1 June 1891	Left
7	Alberto Dallolio	1 June 1891	22 December 1902	Left
8	Enrico Golinelli	22 December 1902	30 January 1905	Left
9	Giuseppe Tanari	30 January 1905	21 November 1910	Right
10	Ettore Nadalini	21 November 1910	15 July 1914	Left
11	Francesco Zanardi	15 July 1914	21 November 1920	PSI
12	Enio Gnudi	21 November 1920	4 March 1923	PSI
13	Umberto Puppini	4 March 1923	26 December 1926	PNF
Fascist Podestà (1926-1945)
1	Leandro Arpinati	26 December 1926	22 September 1929	PNF
2	Antonio Carranti	22 September 1929	24 April 1930	PNF
3	Giovanni Battista Berardi	10 July 1930	1 October 1933	PNF
4	Angelo Manaresi	1 October 1933	10 July 1936	PNF
5	Cesare Colliva	10 July 1936	23 November 1939	PNF
6	Enzo Ferné	23 November 1939	26 August 1943	PNF
7	Mario Agnoli	26 August 1943	25 April 1945	PFR
Liberation (1945-1946)
14	Giuseppe Dozza	25 April 1945	7 April 1946	PCI

=== Republic of Italy (1946–present) ===
From 1945 to 1995, the mayor of Bologna was chosen by the city council.

	Mayor of Bologna	Term start	Term end	Party	Coalition	Election
1	Giuseppe Dozza (1901–1974)	7 April 1946	19 June 1951	PCI	PCI • PSI	1946
1	Giuseppe Dozza (1901–1974)	19 June 1951	30 June 1956	PCI	PCI • PSI	1951
1	Giuseppe Dozza (1901–1974)	30 June 1956	7 December 1960	PCI	PCI • PSI	1956
1	Giuseppe Dozza (1901–1974)	7 December 1960	6 February 1965	PCI	PCI • PSI	1960
1	Giuseppe Dozza (1901–1974)	6 February 1965	2 April 1966	PCI	PCI • PSI	1964
2	Guido Fanti (1925–2012)	2 April 1966	29 July 1970	PCI	PCI • PSI	1964
3	Renato Zangheri (1925–2015)	29 July 1970	23 July 1975	PCI	PCI • PSI • PSIUP	1970
3	Renato Zangheri (1925–2015)	23 July 1975	23 July 1980	PCI	PCI • PSI	1975
3	Renato Zangheri (1925–2015)	23 July 1980	29 April 1983	PCI	PCI • PSI	1980
4	Renzo Imbeni (1944–2005)	29 April 1983	24 July 1985	PCI; PDS	PCI • PSI	1980
4	Renzo Imbeni (1944–2005)	24 July 1985	16 July 1990	PCI; PDS	PCI	1985
4	Renzo Imbeni (1944–2005)	16 July 1990	27 February 1993	PCI; PDS	PCI • PSI • PSDI	1990
5	Walter Vitali (b. 1952)	27 February 1993	24 April 1995	PDS	PDS • PSI • PSDI	1990

Since 1995, under provisions of new local administration law (1993), the mayor of Bologna is chosen by direct election, originally every four years, and since 1999 every five years.

	Mayor of Bologna	Term start	Term end	Party	Coalition	Election
(5)	Walter Vitali (b. 1952)	24 April 1995	30 June 1999	PDS; DS	The Olive Tree (PDS-PPI-FdV)	1995
6	Giorgio Guazzaloca (1944–2017)	30 June 1999	14 June 2004	Ind	Pole for Freedoms (FI-AN)	1999
7	Sergio Cofferati (b. 1948)	14 June 2004	23 June 2009	DS; PD	The Olive Tree (DS-DL-FdV-PRC-IdV)	2004
8	Flavio Delbono (b. 1959)	23 June 2009	17 February 2010 (Note: He resigned following the so-called Cinziagate scandal. Until May 2011 the local government was then presided by Anna Maria Cancellieri, a state-appointed commissioner.)	PD	PD • IdV • FdS • FdV	2009
Special Prefectural Commissioner tenure (17 February 2010 – 16 May 2011)
9	Virginio Merola (b. 1955)	16 May 2011	20 June 2016	PD	PD • SEL • IdV	2011
9	Virginio Merola (b. 1955)	20 June 2016	11 October 2021	PD	PD	2016
10	Matteo Lepore (b. 1980)	11 October 2021 (Note: Election originally scheduled for June 2021 then postponed due to the coronavirus pandemic.)	Incumbent	PD	PD • SI • IV • EV • M5S	2021

==== By time in office ====
Rank	Mayor	Political Party	Total time in office	Terms
1	Giuseppe Dozza	PCI	20 years, 342 days	5
2	Renato Zangheri	PCI	12 years, 274 days	3
3	Virginio Merola	PD	10 years, 141 days	2
4	Renzo Imbeni	PCI	9 years, 304 days	2
5	Walter Vitali	PDS	6 years, 123 days	2
6	Matteo Lepore	PD	5 years, 35 days	1
7	Sergio Cofferati	DS / PD	5 years, 9 days	1
8	Giorgio Guazzaloca	Ind	4 years, 350 days	1
9	Guido Fanti	PCI	4 years, 118 days	1
10	Flavio Delbono	PD	239 days	1

== Elections ==
=== City Council elections, 1946–1990 ===
Results

Number of votes for each party:

Election	DC	PCI	PSI	PLI	PRI	PSDI	MSI	Others	Total
24 March 1946	56,543 (30.3%)	71,369 (38.3%)	49,031 (26.3%)	2,940 (1.6%)	5,343 (2.9%)	–	–	1,200 (0.6%)	186,426
27 May 1951	59,532 (25.8%)	93,043 (40.4%)	16,892 (7.9%)	13,837 (6.0%)	4,409 (1.9%)	32,498 (14.1%)	7,716 (3.6%)	2,350 (1.0%)	230,307
27 May 1956	74,388 (27.7%)	121,556 (45.3%)	19,955 (7.4%)	12,380 (4.6%)	3,412 (1.3%)	23,290 (8.8%)	13,407 (5.0%)	–	268,571
6 November 1960	81,087 (26.7%)	138,090 (45.6%)	25,962 (8.6%)	14,958 (4.9%)	3,298 (1.1%)	26,336 (8.7%)	13,262 (4.4%)	–	302,993
22 November 1964	73,530 (22.0%)	149,433 (44.8%)	25,265 (7.8%)	36,707 (11.0%)	1,672 (0.5%)	27,707 (8.3%)	11,274 (3.4%)	8,055 (2.4%)	333,655
7 June 1970	74,956 (21.3%)	149,339 (42.5%)	26,462 (7.5%)	25,493 (7.3%)	9,347 (2.7%)	36,852 (10.5%)	15,633 (4.6%)	12,956 (3.7%)	351,038
15 June 1975	84,840 (23.1%)	179,622 (49.0%)	34,178 (9.3%)	13,535 (3.7%)	10,659 (2.9%)	24,509 (6.7%)	19,067 (5.2%)	–	366,410
8 June 1980	77,579 (22.5%)	158,585 (46.0%)	32,300 (9.4%)	13,897 (4.0%)	13,630 (4.0%)	21,841 (6.3%)	15,768 (4.6%)	10,822 (3.1%)	344,422
12 May 1985	77,199 (22.7%)	151,113 (44.5%)	40,969 (12.1%)	10,009 (3.0%)	15,372 (4.5%)	10,469 (3.1%)	17,976 (5.3%)	16,409 (4.8%)	339,516
6 May 1990	65,354 (20.4%)	124,237 (38.7%)	44,068 (13.7%)	9,040 (2.8%)	17,670 (5.5%)	5,824 (1.8%)	12,707 (4.0%)	47,774 (14.9%)	320,850

Number of seats in the City Council for each party:

Election	DC	PCI	PSI	PLI	PRI	PSDI	MSI	Others	Total
24 March 1946	19	24	16	–	1	–	–	–	60
27 May 1951	10	33	6	2	1	6	1	1	60
27 May 1956	17	29	4	2	–	5	3	–	60
6 November 1960	17	28	5	3	–	5	2	–	60
22 November 1964	14	28	4	6	–	5	2	1	60
7 June 1970	14	27	4	4	1	6	2	2	60
15 June 1975	14	31	5	2	1	4	3	–	60
8 June 1980	14	29	6	2	2	4	3	–	60
12 May 1985	15	29	7	1	2	2	3	1	60
6 May 1990	13	25	9	1	3	1	2	7	60

=== Mayoral and City Council election, 1995 ===
The election took place on 23 April 1995.

Results

Summary of the 1995 Bologna City Council election results
Parties and coalitions		Votes	%	Seats
Two Towers for Bologna (Due Torri per Bologna)	PDS	104,276	38.65	22
Democrats for Bologna (Democratici per Bologna)	PPI	17,049	6.32	3
Federation of the Greens (Federazione dei Verdi)	FdV	14,136	5.24	3
Vitali coalition (Centre-left)		135,461	50.22	28
National Alliance (Alleanza Nazionale)	AN	46,840	17.36	7
Federalist Union (Unione Federalista)	UF	1,420	0.53	0
Berselli coalition (Right-wing)		48,260	17.89	7
New Bologna (Bologna Nuova)	FI	44,723	16.58	7
Communist Refoundation Party (Rifondazione Comunista)	PRC	20,718	7.68	3
Others		20,600	7.63	1
Total		269,762	100.00	46
Votes cast / turnout		304,106	87.08	
Registered voters		349,220		
Source: Ministry of the Interior

Candidate	Party	Coalition	Votes	%
Walter Vitali	PDS	PDS-PPI-FdV	145,664	50.41
Filippo Berselli	AN	AN-UF	52,127	18.04
Giuseppe Gazzoni Frascara	FI		48,615	16.83
Ugo Renzo Boghetta	PRC		20,452	7.08
Giovanni Salizzoni	Ind		10,569	3.66
Luigi Pasquini	LN		4,533	1.57
Carlo Monaco	LP		3,888	1.35
Others			3,085	1.07
Eligible voters			349,220	100.00
Voted			304,106	87.08
Blank or invalid ballots			15,173	
Total valid votes			288,933	

=== Mayoral and City Council election, 1999 ===
The election took place on two rounds: the first on 13 June, the second on 27 June 1999.

Results

Summary of the 1999 Bologna City Council election results
Parties and coalitions		Votes	%	Seats
For Bologna (Per Bologna)	DS	57,263	25.36	11
The Democrats (I Democratici)	Dem	26,036	11.53	4
Party of Italian Communists (Partito dei Comunisti Italiani)	PdCI	8,789	3.89	1
Federation of the Greens (Federazione dei Verdi)	FdV	5,762	2.55	1
Italian People's Party (Partito Popolare Italiano)	PPI	3,863	1.71	0
Italian Democratic Socialists (Socialisti Democratici Italiani)	SDI	3,303	1.46	0
Bartolini coalition (Centre-left)		105,016	46.50	17
Your Bologna (La Tua Bologna)		35,125	15.55	11
Forza Italia	FI	25,890	11.46	8
National Alliance (Alleanza Nazionale)	AN	24,742	10.96	7
To Govern Bologna (Governare Bologna)		6,737	2.98	2
Guazzaloca coalition (Centre-right)		92,494	40.96	28 (Note: Even if the coalition didn't receive the majority of votes, no other alliance was able to obtain overall more than 50% of votes. Once its mayoral candidate won the second round, the coalition was awarded the majority bonus granted by the electoral law to the alliance whose candidate is elected mayor.)
Communist Refoundation Party (Rifondazione Comunista)	PRC	11,223	4.97	1
Others		17,100	7.57	0
Total		225,833	100.00	46
Votes cast / turnout		265,816	78.85	
Registered voters		337,097		
Source: Ministry of the Interior

Candidate	Party	Coalition	First round		Second round	
Candidate	Party	Coalition	Votes	%	Votes	%
Silvia Bartolini	DS	The Olive Tree	117,367	46.61	110,390	49.31
Giorgio Guazzaloca	Ind	Pole for Freedoms	104,565	41.53	113,462	50.69
Maurizio Zamboni	PRC		11,460	4.55		
Others			18,383	7.31		
Eligible voters			337,097	100.00	337,097	100.00
Voted			265,816	78.85	227,842	67.59
Blank or invalid ballots			14,036		3,990	
Total valid votes			251,780		223,852	

=== Mayoral and City Council election, 2004 ===
The election took place on 12–13 June 2004.

Results

Summary of the 2004 Bologna City Council election results
Parties and coalitions		Votes	%	Seats
Democrats of the Left (Democratici di Sinistra)	DS	80,477	36.54	20
The Daisy (La Margherita)	DL	15,218	6.91	3
Federation of the Greens (Federazione dei Verdi)	FdV	11,418	5.18	2
Communist Refoundation Party (Rifondazione Comunista)	PRC	10,216	4.64	2
Italy of Values (Italia dei Valori)	IdV	4,653	2.11	1
Others		4,566	2.07	0
Cofferati coalition (Centre-left)		126,548	57.46	28
Your Bologna (La Tua Bologna)		40,429	18.36	9
Forza Italia	FI	24,315	11.04	5
National Alliance (Alleanza Nazionale)	AN	18,803	8.54	4
To Govern Bologna (Governare Bologna)		1,268	0.58	0
Guazzaloca coalition (Centre-right)		84,815	38.51	18
Others		8,888	4.03	0
Total		220,251	100.00	46
Votes cast / turnout		261,392	81.81	
Registered voters		337,097		
Source: Ministry of the Interior

Candidate	Party	Coalition	Votes	%
Sergio Cofferati	DS	The Olive Tree	140,795	55.92
Giorgio Guazzaloca	Ind	House of Freedoms	102,221	40.60
Others			8,752	3.48
Eligible voters			319,529	100.00
Voted			261,392	81.81
Blank or invalid ballots			9,624	
Total valid votes			251,768	

=== Mayoral and City Council election, 2009 ===
The election took place in two rounds: the first on 6–7 June, the second on 21–22 June 2009.

Results

Summary of the 2009 Bologna City Council election results
Parties and coalitions		Votes	%	Seats
Democratic Party (Partito Democratico)	PD	85,262	39.91%	24
Italy of Values (Italia dei Valori)	IdV	9,456	4.43%	2
Left for Bologna (Sinistra per Bologna)	SEL	4,554	2.13%	1
Federation of the Left (Federazione della Sinistra)	FdS	3,894	1.82%	1
Others		4,689	2.20%	0
Delbono coalition (Centre-left)		107,855	50.48%	28
The People of Freedom (Il Popolo della Libertà)	PdL	33,134	15.51%	7
Cazzola List (Lista Cazzola)	LC	21,106	9.88%	4
Lega Nord	LN	6,705	3.14%	1
Others		470	0.22%	0
Cazzola coalition (Centre-right)		61,415	28.74%	12
Guazzaloca For Bologna (Guazzaloca Per Bologna)	GPB	26,099	12.22%	5
Beppegrillo.it		6,450	3.02%	1
Others		11,430	5.35%	0
Total		213,645	100%	46
Votes cast / turnout		233,045	76.39%	
Registered voters		305,086		
Source: Ministry of the Interior

Candidate	Party	Coalition	First round		Second round	
Candidate	Party	Coalition	Votes	%	Votes	%
Flavio Delbono	PD	PD-IdV-SEL-FdS	112,127	49.40	112,789	60.77
Alfredo Cazzola	PdL	PdL-LN	66,056	29.10	72,798	39.23
Giorgio Guazzaloca	Ind		28,785	12.68		
Others			20,015	8.82		
Eligible voters			305,086	100.00	305,086	100.00
Voted			233,045	76.39	189,772	62.20
Blank or invalid ballots			6,062		4,185	
Total valid votes			226,983		185,587	

=== Mayoral and City Council election, 2011 ===
The election took place on 15–16 May 2011.

Results

Summary of the 2011 Bologna City Council election results
Parties and coalitions		Votes	%	Seats
Democratic Party (Partito Democratico)	PD	72,335	38.28%	17
Left for Bologna (Sinistra per Bologna)	SEL	19,358	10.24%	4
Italy of Values (Italia dei Valori)	IdV	6,938	3.70%	1
Federation of the Left (Federazione della Sinistra)	FdS	2,776	1.46%	0
Others		1,118	0.59%	0
Merola coalition (Centre-left)		102,560	54.27%	22
The People of Freedom (Il Popolo della Libertà)	PdL	31,374	16.60%	6
Lega Nord	LN	20,268	10.72%	4
Bernardini coalition (Centre-right)		51,642	27.33%	10
Five Star Movement (Movimento Cinque Stelle)	M5S	17,778	9.41%	3
Aldrovandi List (Lista Aldrovandi)	LA	8,961	4.74%	1
Others		8,043	4.25%	0
Total		188,984	100%	36
Votes cast / turnout		215,534	71.41%	
Registered voters		301,384		
Source: Ministry of the Interior

Candidate	Party	Coalition	Votes	%
Virginio Merola	PD	PD-SEL-IdV-FdS	106,070	50.47
Manes Bernardini	LN	PdL-LN	63,799	30.35
Massimo Bugani	M5S		19,969	9.50
Stefano Aldrovandi	Ind		10,679	5.08
Others			9,668	5.14
Eligible voters			301,834	100.00
Voted			215,534	81.81
Blank or invalid ballots			5,349	
Total valid votes			210,185	

=== Mayoral and City Council election, 2016 ===
The election took place in two rounds: the first on 5 June, the second on 19 June 2016.

Results

Summary of the 2016 Bologna City Council election results
Parties and coalitions		Votes	%	Seats
Democratic Party (Partito Democratico)	PD	60,066	35.46%	21
Common City (Città Comune)	CC	4,917	2.90%	1
Others		3,228	1.91%	0
Merola coalition (Centre-left)		68,211	40.26%	22
Lega Nord	LN	17,376	10.26%	4
Forza Italia	FI	10,614	6.27%	2
Others		92,740	5.47%	0
Borgonzoni coalition (Centre-right)		37,264	22.00%	6
Five Star Movement (Movimento Cinque Stelle)	M5S	28,115	16.60%	4
Together Bologna (Insieme Bologna)	AP	16,844	9.94%	2
Civic Coalition (Coalizione Civica)	SEL	12,017	7.09%	2
Others		4,384	2.58%	0
Total		169,409	100%	36
Votes cast / turnout		179,325	59.66%	
Registered voters		300,586		
Source: Ministry of the Interior

Candidate	Party	Coalition	First round		Second round	
Candidate	Party	Coalition	Votes	%	Votes	%
Virginio Merola	PD		68,772	39.48	83,907	54.64
Lucia Borgonzoni	LN	FI-LN-FdI	38,807	22.28	69,660	45.36
Massimo Bugani	M5S		28,889	16.59		
Manes Bernardini	Ind	AP	18,188	10.44		
Federico Martelloni	Ind	SEL-Pos	12,188	7.00		
Matteo Badiali	FdV		2,645	1.52		
Ermanno Lorenzoni	PCdL		2,178	1.25		
Mirko De Carli	PdF		2,074	1.19		
Others			446	0.26		
Eligible voters			300,586	100.00	300,586	100.00
Voted			179,325	59.66	159,818	53.17
Blank or invalid ballots			5,138		6,251	
Total valid votes			174,187		153,567	

=== Mayoral and City Council election, 2021 ===
The election took place on 3–4 October 2021.

Results

Summary of the 2021 Bologna City Council election results
Parties and coalitions		Votes	%	Seats
Democratic Party (Partito Democratico)	PD	53,486	36.50%	16
Civic Coalition (Coalizione Civica)	LeU	10,722	7.32%	3
Lepore List (Lista Lepore)	LL	9,303	6.35%	2
You Also Count (Anche Tu Conti)	IV	8,376	5.72%	2
Five Star Movement (Movimento Cinque Stelle)	M5S	4,938	3.37%	1
Green Europe (Europa Verde)	EV	4,113	2.81%	1
Others		1,335	0.91%	0
Lepore coalition (Centre-left)		92,273	62.96%	25
Brothers of Italy (Fratelli d'Italia)	FdI	18,514	12.63%	6
Lega		11,346	7.74%	3
Battistini List (Lista Battistini)	LB	6,640	4.53%	1
Forza Italia	FI	5,561	3.79%	1
The People of the Family (Il Popolo della Famiglia)	PdF	598	0.41%	0
Battistini coalition (Centre-right)		42,659	29.11%	11
Others		11,621	7.93%	0
Total		146,553	100%	36
Votes cast / turnout		156,742	51.18%	
Registered voters		306,240		
Source: Ministry of the Interior

Candidate	Party	Coalition	Votes	%
Matteo Lepore	PD	PD-LeU-IV-M5S-EV-PSI-Volt	94,565	61.90
Fabio Battistini	Ind	FdI-Lega-FI-PdF	45,282	29.64
Marta Collot	PaP		3,801	2.49
Stefano Sermenghi	IE		3,053	2.00
Andrea Tosatto	M3V		2,497	1.63
Dora Palumbo	PRC	PRC-PCI	2,433	1.59
Federico Bacchiocchi	PCdL		625	0.41
Luca Labanti	M24A		508	0.33
Eligible voters			306,240	100.00
Voted			156,742	51.18
Blank or invalid ballots			3,978	
Total valid votes			152,764	

=== Mayoral and City Council election, 2027 ===
These elections, originally scheduled to take place in October 2026, will take place in Spring 2027. According to the Italian law, since 2011 local elections can take place each year only between 15 April and 15 June.

== See also ==
- Timeline of Bologna
