= List of Democratic Party of Italy politicians =

A list of notable politicians of the Democratic Party of Italy:

== A ==
- Marisa Abbondanzieri
- Nicola Adamo
- Mauro Agostini
- Giuliano Amato
- Alfonso Andria
- Salvo Andò
- Giuseppe Ayala

== B ==
- Augusto Barbera
- Franco Bassanini
- Antonio Bassolino
- Giorgio Benvenuto
- Luigi Berlinguer
- Rita Bernardini
- Pier Luigi Bersani
- Giovanni Bianchi
- Enzo Bianco
- Gerardo Bianco
- Rosy Bindi
- Paola Binetti
- Guido Bodrato
- Rita Borsellino
- Mercedes Bresso
- Claudio Burlando

== C ==
- Massimo Cacciari
- Massimo Calearo
- Salvatore Cardinale
- Pierre Carniti
- Salvatore Caronna
- Patrizia Casagrande Esposto
- Pierluigi Castagnetti
- Luca Ceriscioli
- Sergio Chiamparino
- Carlo Azeglio Ciampi
- Graziano Cioni
- Giuseppe Civati
- Luigi Cocilovo
- Sergio Cofferati
- Tommaso Coletti
- Paola Concia
- Rosario Crocetta
- Gianni Cuperlo

== D ==
- Massimo D'Alema
- Luciano D'Alfonso
- Sergio D'Antoni
- Pier Giorgio Dall'Acqua
- Cesare Damiano
- Ciriaco De Mita
- Ottaviano Del Turco
- Flavio Delbono
- Lorenzo Dellai
- Graziano Delrio
- Bruno Dettori
- Leonardo Domenici

== E ==
- Michele Emiliano
- Vasco Errani

== F ==
- Piero Fassino
- Massimo Federici
- Emanuele Fiano
- Anna Finocchiaro
- Giuseppe Fioroni
- Maurizio Fistarol
- Marco Follini
- Marco Formentini
- Dario Franceschini
- Franco Frigo

== G ==
- Paolo Gentiloni
- Roberto Giachetti
- Paolo Giaretta
- Giuseppe Giulietti
- Donata Gottardi
- Lilli Gruber
- Roberto Gualtieri

== I ==
- Rosa Russo Iervolino

== K ==
- Giovanni Kessler

== L ==
- Linda Lanzillotta
- Vincenzo Lavarra
- Enrico Letta
- Massimo Livi Bacci
- Maria Rita Lorenzetti
- Andrea Losco
- Giuseppe Lumia

== M ==
- Antonio Maccanico
- Marianna Madia
- Enrico Manca
- Nicola Mancino
- Luigi Manconi
- Pietro Marcenaro
- Catiuscia Marini
- Franco Marini
- Ignazio Marino
- Piero Marrazzo
- Sergio Mattarella
- Giovanna Melandri
- Virginio Merola
- Maurizio Migliavacca
- Marco Minniti
- Alessia Mosca

== O ==
- Mario Oliverio
- Rosario Olivo
- Andrea Orlando

== P ==
- Pier Antonio Panzeri
- Arturo Parisi
- Giovanni Pellegrino
- Giuseppe Pericu
- Claudio Petruccioli
- Pina Picierno
- Roberta Pinotti
- Lapo Pistelli
- Gianni Pittella
- Barbara Pollastrini
- Giovanni Procacci
- Romano Prodi
- Vittorio Prodi

== R ==
- Piero Rebaudengo
- Matteo Renzi
- Sergio Reolon
- Stefano Rodotà
- Ettore Rosato
- Francesco Rutelli

== S ==
- Guido Sacconi
- Cataldo Salerno
- Giulio Santagata
- Riccardo Sarfatti
- Luciana Sbarbati
- Oscar Luigi Scalfaro
- Ivan Scalfarotto
- Marina Sereni
- Achille Serra
- Renato Soru
- Gian Mario Spacca
- Gianluca Susta

== T ==
- Patrizia Toia
- Jean-Léonard Touadi
- Livia Turco

== V ==
- Guglielmo Vaccaro
- Achille Variati
- Walter Veltroni
- Donato Veraldi
- Gianni Vernetti
- Umberto Veronesi
- Marta Vincenzi
- Luciano Violante
- Vincenzo Visco

== Z ==
- Mauro Zani
- Flavio Zanonato
- Valerio Zanone
