= 2009 Bologna municipal election =

← 2004	6–7 and 21–22 June 2009	2011 →
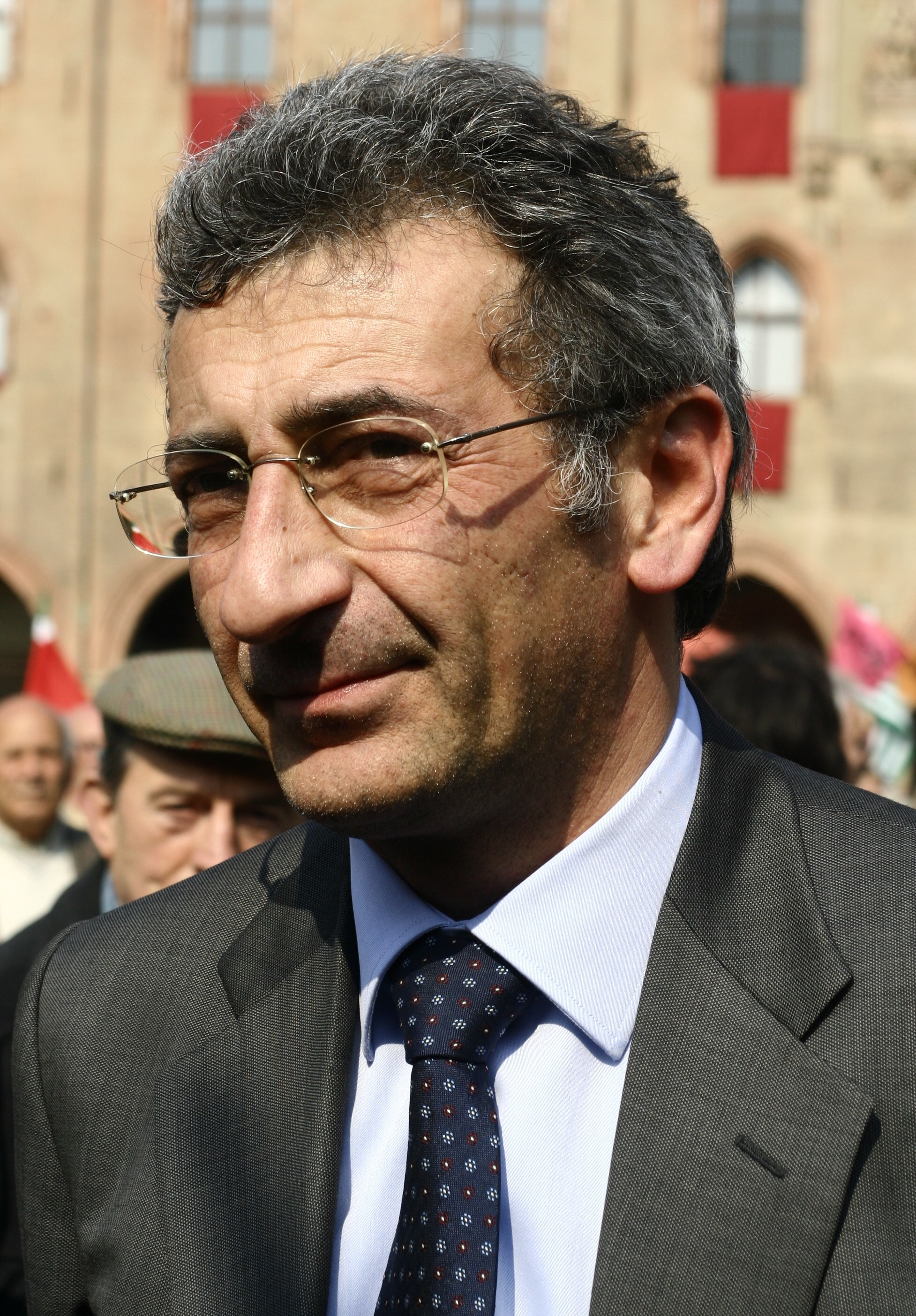

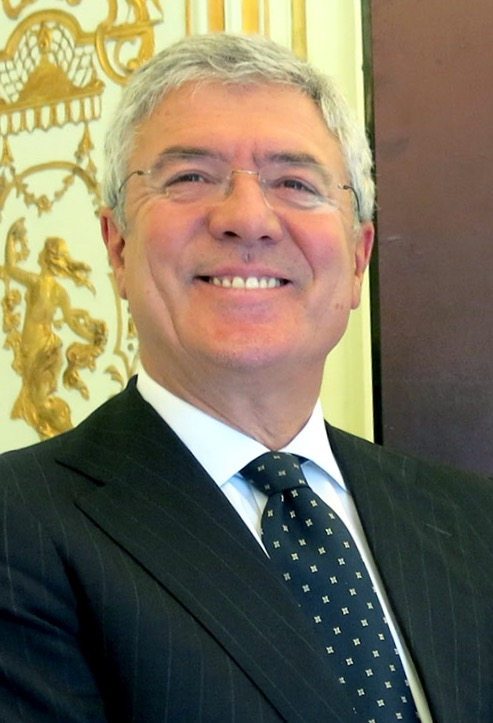
Candidate	Flavio Delbono	Alfredo Cazzola
Party	Democratic Party	People of Freedom
Alliance	Centre-left	Centre-right
Popular vote	112,127	66,056
Percentage	49.40%	29.10%
Popular vote (2nd)	112,789	72,798
Percentage (2nd)	60.77%	39.23%
Mayor before election
Sergio Cofferati
Democratic Party
Elected mayor
Flavio Delbono
Democratic Party

Municipal elections were held in Bologna on 6–7 and 21–22 June 2009. The centre-left candidate Flavio Delbono was elected mayor at the second round with 60.77% of votes.

== Background ==
The centre-left primary elections took place on 13 and 14 December 2008. The Vice-President of Emilia-Romagna, Flavio Delbono, received 49.73% of the 24,920 votes cast in the primary; Maurizio Cevenini received 23.29%, Virginio Merola received 21.44% and Andrea Forlani received 5.1%. On 9 January 2009, Delbono announced that he would be resigning as vice-president of Emilia-Romagna and regional assessor in order to focus on his election campaign.

The other candidates were Alfredo Cazzola, former owner of Virtus Bologna and Bologna F.C., who was the candidate of The People of Freedom and Northern League, and Giorgio Guazzaloca, a former mayor of Bologna.

== Voting system ==
The voting system is used for all mayoral elections in Italy, in the city with a population higher than 15,000 inhabitants. Under this system voters express a direct choice for the mayor or an indirect choice voting for the party of the candidate's coalition. If no candidate receives 50% of votes, the top two candidates go to a second round after two weeks. This gives a result whereby the winning candidate may be able to claim majority support, although it is not guaranteed.

The election of the City Council is based on a direct choice for the candidate with a preference vote: the candidate with the majority of the preferences is elected. The number of the seats for each party is determined proportionally.

== Main parties and leaders ==
Political force or alliance	Constituent lists	Leader
Bologna Free City	Bologna Free City	Valerio Monteventi
Citizens for Bologna	Citizens for Bologna	Gianfranco Pasquino
Centre-left coalition	Democratic Party	Flavio Delbono
Centre-left coalition	Italy of Values	Flavio Delbono
Centre-left coalition	Left for Bologna (incl. PS and SD)	Flavio Delbono
Centre-left coalition	PRC – PdCI	Flavio Delbono
Centre-left coalition	Federation of the Greens	Flavio Delbono
Centre-left coalition	Civic lists	Flavio Delbono
Five Star Movement	Five Star Movement	Giovanni Favia
Guazzaloca For Bologna	Guazzaloca For Bologna (incl. UDC)	Giorgio Guazzaloca
Centre-right coalition	The People of Freedom	Alfredo Cazzola
Centre-right coalition	Northern League	Alfredo Cazzola
Centre-right coalition	Civic lists	Alfredo Cazzola

== Results ==
Summary of the 2009 Bologna City Council election results
Candidates	I round		II round		Leaders seats	Parties	Votes	%	Seats
Candidates	Votes	%	Votes	%	Leaders seats	Parties	Votes	%	Seats
Flavio Delbono	112,127	49.40	112,789	60.77	–	Democratic Party	85,262	39.91	24
Flavio Delbono	112,127	49.40	112,789	60.77	–	Italy of Values	9,456	4.43	2
Flavio Delbono	112,127	49.40	112,789	60.77	–	Left for Bologna	4,554	2.13	1
Flavio Delbono	112,127	49.40	112,789	60.77	–	Communist Refoundation Party – Party of Italian Communists	3,894	1.82	1
Flavio Delbono	112,127	49.40	112,789	60.77	–	Bologna 2014	1,980	0.93	–
Flavio Delbono	112,127	49.40	112,789	60.77	–	Federation of the Greens	1,831	0.86	–
Flavio Delbono	112,127	49.40	112,789	60.77	–	Bologna to the Centre	878	0.41	–
Alfredo Cazzola	66,056	29.10	72,798	39.23	1	The People of Freedom	33,134	15.51	6
Alfredo Cazzola	66,056	29.10	72,798	39.23	1	Alfredo Cazzola for Mayor	21,106	9.88	4
Alfredo Cazzola	66,056	29.10	72,798	39.23	1	Northern League	6,705	3.14	1
Alfredo Cazzola	66,056	29.10	72,798	39.23	1	Third Pole of the Centre – Christian Democracy	470	0.22	–
Alfredo Cazzola	66,056	29.10	72,798	39.23	1	Co.Da.Cons (A)	396	0.19	–
Giorgio Guazzaloca	28,785	12.68	–	–	1	Giorgio Guazzaloca for Bologna	26,099	12.22	5
Giovanni Favia	7,428	3.27	–	–	1	Five Star Civic List	6,450	3.02	–
Giovanni Favia	7,428	3.27	–	–	1	(A)			
Gianfranco Pasquino	4,448	1.96	–	–	–	Citizens for Bologna	3,704	1.73	–
Valerio Monteventi	3,625	1.60	–	–	–	Bologna Free City	3,567	1.67	–
Giuseppina Tedde	1,094	0.48	–	–	–	Other City	973	0.46	–
Michele Terra	893	0.39	–	–	–	Workers' Communist Party	841	0.39	–
Alessandro Mazzanti	728	0.32	–	–	–	Tricolour Flame	672	0.31	–
Stefano Morselli	601	0.26	–	–	–	Stefano Morselli for Mayor	550	0.26	–
Giulio Tam	458	0.20	–	–	–	New Force	435	0.20	–
Leonardo Tucci	414	0.18	–	–	–	9 United Neighborhoods for Bologna	372	0.17	–
Michele Laganà	326	0.14	–	–	–	Future Bologna	316	0.15	–
Total	226,983	100.00	185,587	100.00	3		213,645	100.00	43
Source: Ministry of the Interior

Popular vote
PD	39.91%
PdL	15.51%
GpB	12.22%
ACS	9.88%
IdV	4.43%
LN	3.14%
M5S	3.02%
SEL	2.13%
PRC–PdCI	1.82%
Others	7.94%

Mayor (1st round)
Delbono	49.40%
Cazzola	29.10%
Guazzaloca	12.68%
Favia	3.27%
Pasquino	1.96%
Monteventi	1.60%
Others	1.99%

Mayor (2nd round)
Delbono	60.77%
Cazzola	39.23%
