= Matteo Lepore =

Italian politician (born 1980)

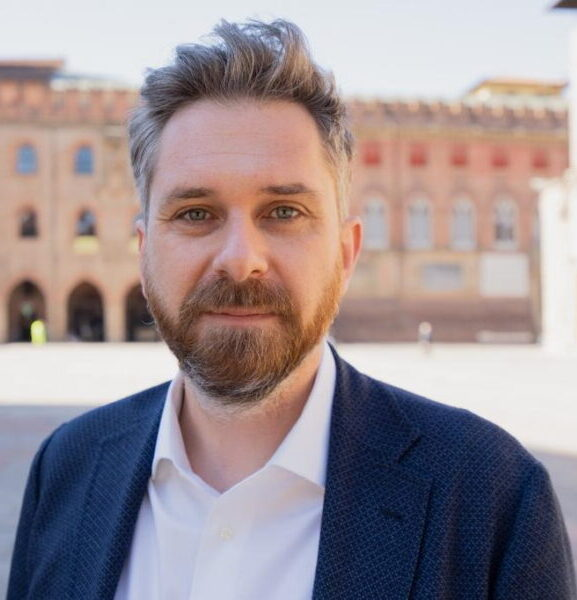
- Lepore in 2022

Mayor of Bologna
- Incumbent
- Assumed office 11 October 2021
- Preceded by: Virginio Merola

Personal details
- Born: 10 October 1980 (age 45) Bologna, Emilia-Romagna, Italy
- Party: DS (1999–2007); PD (2007–present)
- Education: University of Bologna
- Occupation: Politician
- Website: matteolepore.it

Matteo Lepore (Italian pronunciation: [matˈtɛːo ˈlɛːpore]; born 10 October 1980) is an Italian politician. A member of the Democratic Party (PD), he has served as mayor of Bologna since 11 October 2021.

== Early life ==
Lepore was born in Bologna in 1980 and grew up in the Savena district. He attended the classical lyceum Luigi Galvani and graduated in political science from the University of Bologna. In 2007, he obtained a master's degree in international relations, after having carried out an internship in Brussels at the Liaison Office with the European Institutions of the Emilia-Romagna Region. In 2008 he obtained another master's degree in building and urban planning and in 2009 one in cooperation economics, both at the University of Bologna.

From 2008 to 2011, Lepore was responsible for the territorial development, innovation and internationalization area of Legacoop Bologna. In 2010, he was part of the organizing technical committee for the city of Bologna at the 2010 Shanghai Expo.

== Political career ==
Lepore became a member of the Democrats of the Left (DS) in 1999. In 2007, he was among the founders of the Democratic Party (PD).

Following the 2011 municipal election with the victory of Virginio Merola, Lepore was appointed municipal councilor for Institutional Affairs, Demographic Services, International Relations, Communication, Urban Marketing, Innovation and Work. He was elected as a town councilor in the 2016 election, and was then appointed councilor for Culture, Tourism, Heritage, Sport and Civic Imagination. He became one of the closest advisor of Merola and widely considered his most probable successor as mayor.

=== Mayor of Bologna ===
In 2021, Lepore announced his intention to run as mayor of Bologna in the upcoming election. In June 2021, Lepore took part in the primary election of the center-left coalition to choose the candidate for mayor of Bologna, and defeated Isabella Conti, mayor of San Lazzaro di Savena, with 59.6% of votes against 40.6%. In the October 2021 municipal election, Lepore was elected mayor in the first round with 61.9% of votes, defeating the centre-right candidate Fabio Battistini with 29.6%, and becoming the most voted mayor of Bologna since the introduction of the direct elections in 1995.

== See also ==
- List of mayors of Bologna
- List of Democratic Party of Italy politicians
