= Lucia Borgonzoni =

Italian politician

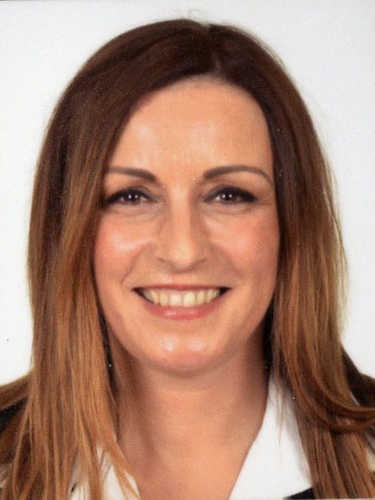

Member of the Senate of the Republic
- Incumbent
- Assumed office March 23, 2018
- Constituency: Emilia-Romagna - 01

Personal details
- Born: September 18, 1976 (age 49) Bologna, Emilia-Romagna, Italy
- Party: Northern League
- Education: Accademia di Belle Arti di Bologna
- Profession: politician, interior designer

Lucia Borgonzoni (born September 18, 1976) is an Italian politician and member of the Senate of Italy. She served as Undersecretary for Cultural Heritage and Activities in the Conte I Cabinet.

== Biography ==
Daughter of Italian architect Giambattista Borgonzoni and granddaughter of painter and partisan Aldo Borgonzoni [it], Lucia Borgonzoni graduated in Visual Arts at the Academy of Fine Arts in Bologna with a thesis in Phenomenology of styles. She proceeded to showcase her works in various exhibitions in Italy, and worked both as an interior designer and a bartender at LINK social centre in Bologna.

She joined Northern League in 1992 and attained leadership of Young Padanians Movement in Bologna. In the 2009 provincial elections she was elected to the Provincial council of Bologna within a centre-right coalition. She resigned following her election to the municipal council of Bologna in the 2011 Italian local elections.

In the 2016 municipal elections, she was candidate for Mayor of Bologna for the centre-right coalition; her electoral platform focused on security policies and "giving priority to Bolognesi". Borgonzoni secured a 22.3% result in the first round, but lost the runoff vote to encumber Mayor of Bologna Virginio Merola, who won with 45.4% of the vote.

In the 2018 parliamentary election, Lucia Borgonzoni was elected Member of the Senate in the Emilia-Romagna - 01 constituency. She served as Undersecretary for Cultural Heritage and Activities in the Conte I Cabinet from 2018 to 2019.

In October 2019 Borgonzoni announced her candidacy for President of Emilia-Romagna, backed by a centre-right coalition of League, Brothers of Italy, Forza Italia, The People of the Family and other minor parties. In the 2019 regional elections she placed second with 43.63% of the vote, losing to incumbent centre-left President Stefano Bonaccini, who secured a 51.42% result. In March 2020 she formally renounced to her seat in the Regional council, incompatible with her role as Senator.
