= Walter Vitali =

Italian politician (born 1952)

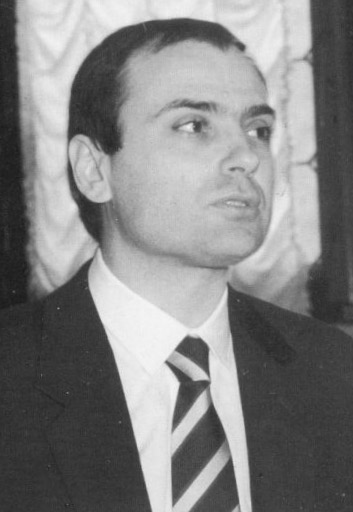

Mayor of Bologna
- In office 27 February 1993 – 30 June 1999
- Preceded by: Renzo Imbeni
- Succeeded by: Giorgio Guazzaloca

Member of the Senate
- In office 30 May 2001 – 14 March 2013
- Constituency: Emilia-Romagna

Personal details
- Born: 30 September 1952 (age 74) Minerbio, Italy
- Party: PCI (till 1991); PDS (1991-1998); DS (1998-2007); PD (since 2007)
- Education: University of Bologna
- Occupation: Politician

Walter Vitali (born 30 September 1952) is an Italian politician, Mayor of Bologna from 1993 to 1999.

== Biography ==
Before graduating in Philosophy at the University of Bologna in 1975, Vitali joined the Federation of Italian Communist Youth. In 1980, Vitali is elected to the city council of Bologna and has been councilor for Youth and Institutional Affairs under the guide of mayors Renato Zangheri and Renzo Imbeni, with which he has also been appointed councilor for Budget from 1989 to 1993.

=== Mayor of Bologna ===
In 1993, Vitali is appointed Mayor of Bologna, becoming the last mayor of the city appointed by the city councilors. At the 1995 local elections, the first elections where the mayor was elected directly by the people of Bologna, Vitali is re-confirmed mayor, receiving support from the whole Olive Tree coalition. In 1998, during his term as mayor, Bologna has been appointed European Capital of Culture for the year 2000.

=== Senator ===
Vitali decided not to run for another term as mayor in 1999 and instead run for a seat in the Italian Senate at the 2001 general election. He held his seat in Palazzo Madama for three consecutive legislatures from 2001 to 2013.
