= Giuseppe Dozza =

Italian politician (1901–1974)

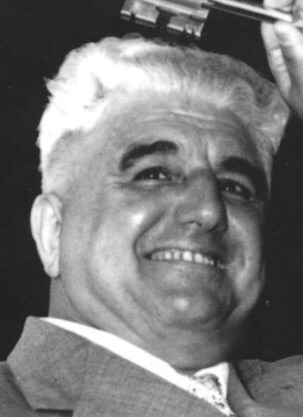

Mayor of Bologna
- In office 25 April 1945 – 2 April 1966
- Preceded by: Mario Agnoli (Podestà)
- Succeeded by: Guido Fanti

Member of the Constituent Assembly
- In office 25 June 1946 – 31 January 1948
- Constituency: Bologna

Personal details
- Born: 29 November 1901 Bologna, Italy
- Died: 28 December 1974 (aged 73) Bologna, Italy
- Party: Italian Communist Party
- Occupation: Politician

Giuseppe Dozza (29 November 1901 – 28 December 1974) was an Italian politician, the first Mayor of Bologna after the end of World War II.

== Biography ==
=== The resistance ===
One of the founders of the Communist Party of Italy, Dozza was immediately persecuted by the Fascist regime and expatriated in France in the 1920s. He returned to Italy only in 1943 to participate in the resistance movement in his hometown Bologna. The National Liberation Committee already decided that once Bologna has been freed, Dozza would have become its Mayor.

=== Member of the Constituent Assembly ===
In the 1946 general election, Dozza is elected at the Constituent Assembly, participating in the drafting of what would later become the Italian Constitution.

=== Mayor of Bologna ===
Once elected Mayor, Dozza began immediately to instil confidence in citizens and encouraged them to participate in the reconstruction of the city.

Dozza had committed himself to the autonomous battle of Bologna, demanding more decentralized powers and claiming the financial autonomy of local authorities. Dozza brought solidarity to workers in crisis and equipped the first industrial areas that were the avant-gardes of the economic boom.

Dozza established the tax councils, which combined the need for self-government of Bologna with the principle of "progressive taxation" and with the principle of control of citizens in finding economic resources. They worked at full speed with transparency and without inflicting too heavy tax burdens on the middle classes and saving the popular classes.

In the early 1950s, Dozza's administration also provided a generous sum of money to the University of Bologna, gathering the consensus of the world of culture and that of the productive forces that liked Dozza's plan to fund research on the use of nuclear energy for peaceful purposes.

Dozza saw the solidity of his electoral consent when he won the 1956 local elections against the Christian Democratic leader of Bologna Giuseppe Dossetti. In the last ten years of his term, Dozza concentrated on more ambitious designs, such as the ring road, the fair district and the revival of cultural life.

However, in 1962 Dozza became ill and was forced to resign four years later. During his final years of his service for the city, Umbro Lorenzini (1925-2000), who was an assessor at that time, helped him with different projects, such as Bologna's orbital road. He died on 28 December 1974, at the age of 73, and is buried in the Certosa di Bologna monastery.
