= Annamaria Cancellieri =

Italian official and prefect

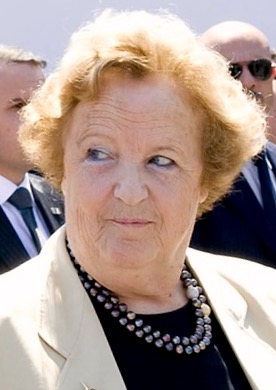

Minister of Justice
- In office 28 April 2013 – 22 February 2014
- Prime Minister: Enrico Letta
- Preceded by: Paola Severino
- Succeeded by: Andrea Orlando

Minister of the Interior
- In office 16 November 2011 – 28 April 2013
- Prime Minister: Mario Monti
- Preceded by: Roberto Maroni
- Succeeded by: Angelino Alfano

Commissioner of Bologna
- In office 17 February 2010 – 16 May 2011
- Preceded by: Flavio Delbono
- Succeeded by: Virginio Merola

Personal details
- Born: 22 October 1943 (age 82) Rome, Italy
- Party: Independent
- Education: Sapienza University of Rome

Annamaria Cancellieri (born 22 October 1943) is an Italian official and prefect who served as Minister of Interior in the Monti Cabinet and Minister of Justice in the Letta Cabinet.

== Early life and education ==
Cancellieri was born in Rome on 22 October 1943. She studied political science at the University of Rome.

== Career ==
Cancellieri worked for the ministry of interior beginning in 1972. She then worked as a Prefetto (prefect) in Bologna, Vicenza, Bergamo, Brescia, Catania and Genova. She retired from the provincial-level government representation. She was subsequently appointed special commissioner of the municipalities of Bologna (in February 2010) and of Parma (in October 2011), temporarily taking over from the mayors in the wake of political scandals.

She was appointed minister of interior on 16 November 2011, and was one of the technocrats in the Monti cabinet.

Her term in the Monti cabinet ended on 27 April 2013 when Enrico Letta announced that she would serve as justice minister in his cabinet. The following day her tenure as justice minister began and she replaced Paola Severino in the post. Andrea Orlando replaced her in the post in February 2014 when the Renzi cabinet was formed.

== Italian court reform ==
In 2013, Cancellieri and Letta's government went ahead with Severino's (and Monti government's) reform of Italian courts initially planned in 2012. This overdue reform was deemed necessary by a number of people in order to streamline the functioning of some of the State's courts and was part of an effort by the Italian authorities to reduce the spending of public money. However, some harsh debate arose as cases occurred in which Cancellieri ordered to close efficient courts (e.g. the court of Bassano del Grappa, one of the quickest in Italy) merging them with slower, less efficient courts. The decree was also passed in contrast to the requests of various authorities of Bassano and Veneto, and even in contrast to the Italian Parliament's official stand. The closing of the court of Bassano was later confirmed by the Constitutional Court of Italy with the reason that "the courts of Bassano and Belluno could not be balanced within the same province..." despite the fact that Bassano and Belluno are not in the same province and the Court's judgement was thus based on a false premise.

Political offices
Preceded by Roberto Maroni	Italian Minister of the Interior; 2011–2013	Succeeded by Angelino Alfano
Preceded by Paola Severino	Italian Minister of Justice; 2013–2014	Succeeded by Andrea Orlando
