= 2021 Bologna municipal election =

Election in Bologna

- 3–4 October 2021
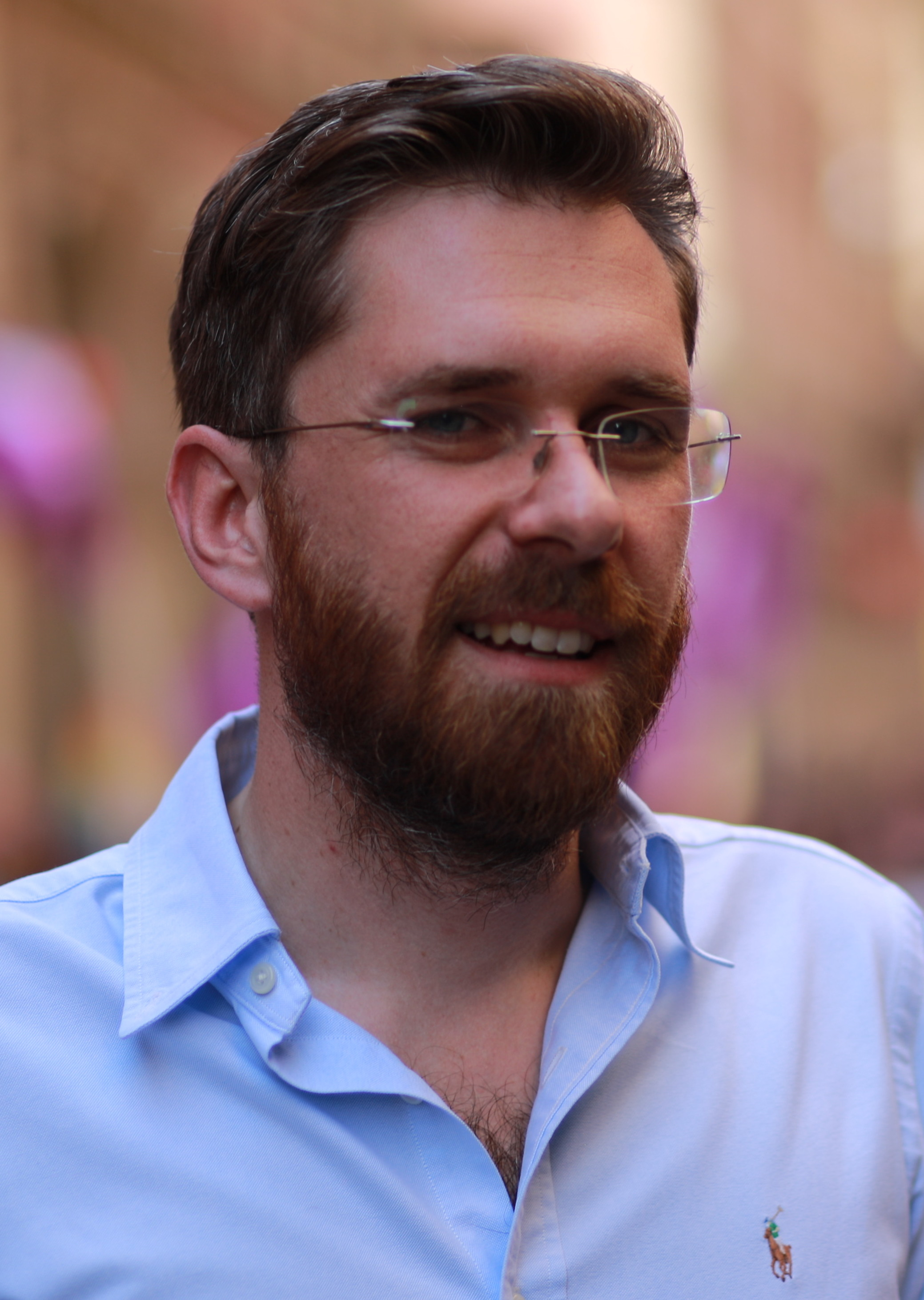

	Majority party	Minority party
Candidate	Matteo Lepore	Fabio Battistini
Party	Democratic Party	Independent
Alliance	Centre-left	Centre-right
Seats won	25	11
Popular vote	94,565	45,282
Percentage	61.9%	29.6%
Mayor before election
Virginio Merola
Democratic Party
Elected mayor
Matteo Lepore
Democratic Party

The municipal elections in Bologna took place on 3 and 4 October 2021. The incumbent Mayor of Bologna was Virginio Merola of Democratic Party, who won the 2016 Bologna municipal election. The centre-left candidate Matteo Lepore won in a landslide with 62% of votes, becoming the most voted mayor since the introduction of direct elections in 1995.

== Electoral system ==
The voting system is used for all mayoral elections in Italy, in the cities with a population higher than 15,000 inhabitants. Under this system, voters express a direct choice for the mayor or an indirect choice voting for the party of the candidate's coalition. If no candidate receives 50% of votes during the first round, the top two candidates go to a second round after two weeks. The winning candidate obtains a majority bonus equal to 60% of seats. During the first round, if no candidate gets more than 50% of votes but a coalition of lists gets the majority of 50% of votes or if the mayor is elected in the first round but its coalition gets less than 40% of the valid votes, the majority bonus cannot be assigned to the coalition of the winning mayor candidate.

The election of the City Council is based on a direct choice for the candidate with a maximum of two preferential votes, each for a different gender, belonging to the same party list: the candidate with the majority of the preferences is elected. The number of the seats for each party is determined proportionally, using D'Hondt seat allocation. Only coalitions with more than 3% of votes are eligible to get any seats.

== Background ==
=== Centre-left primary election ===
Candidate	Party	Votes	%	Notes
Matteo Lepore	Democratic Party	15,750	59.6%	
Isabella Conti	Italia Viva	10,672	40.4%	
Total		26,422	100%	

==== Endorsements ====
===== Matteo Lepore =====
- Anna Ascani (PD), current Vicepresident of the Democratic Party (2019–today) and Undersecretary for Economic Development (2021–today)
- Stefano Bonaccini (PD), current President of Emilia-Romagna (2014–today)
- Emily Marion Clancy (SI), municipal councillor for Bologna (2016–today)
- Giuseppe Conte (M5S), former Prime Minister (2018–2021)
- Valentina Cuppi (PD), current President of the Democratic Party (2020–today), mayor of Marzabotto (2019–today)
- Andrea De Maria (PD), Member of the Chamber of Deputies (2013–today), mayor of Marzabotto (1995–2004)
- Vasco Errani (Art.1), former President of Emilia-Romagna (1999–2014)
- Cathy La Torre (Independent), lawyer and LGBT activist, municipal councillor for Bologna (2011–2016)
- Nicola Fratoianni (SI), current Secretary of Italian Left (2017–2019; 2021–today)
- Enrico Letta (PD), current Secretary of the Democratic Party (2021–today) and former Prime Minister (2013–2014)
- Virginio Merola (PD), current Mayor of Bologna (2011–today)
- Dario Nardella (PD), current Mayor of Florence (2014–today)
- Romano Prodi (Independent), former Prime Minister (1996–1998; 2006–2008)
- Peppe Provenzano (PD), current Deputy secretary of the Democratic Party (2021–today) and former Minister for Territorial Cohesion (2019–2021)
- Mattia Santori (Independent), leader of the Sardines movement
- Elly Schlein (GI), current Vicepresident of Emilia-Romagna (2020–today)
- Nicola Zingaretti (PD), President of Lazio (2013–today) and former Secretary of the Democratic Party (2019–2021)

===== Isabella Conti =====
- Alberto Aitini (PD), municipal assessor for Bologna (2016–today)
- Mauro Felicori (Independent), regional assessor of Culture (2020–today)
- Gian Luca Galletti (CpE), Minister of Environment (2014–2018), member of the Chamber of Deputies (2006–2013)
- Elisabetta Gualmini (PD), Member of the European Parliament (2019–today)
- Marco Lombardo (PD), municipal assessor for Bologna (2016–today)
- Matteo Renzi (IV), member of the Senate of the Republic (2018–today), former Prime Minister (2014–2016)
- Giampiero Veronesi (PD), Mayor of Anzola dell'Emilia (2014–today)

== Parties and candidates ==
This is a list of the parties (and their respective leaders) which will participate in the election.

Political force or alliance	Constituent lists	Candidate
Centre-left coalition	Democratic Party	Matteo Lepore
Centre-left coalition	Five Star Movement	Matteo Lepore
Centre-left coalition	Matteo Lepore for Mayor	Matteo Lepore
Centre-left coalition	Civic Coalition for Bologna (incl. SI, Art.1, Pos, èViva)	Matteo Lepore
Centre-left coalition	You Also Count (incl. IV, +E)	Matteo Lepore
Centre-left coalition	Green Europe	Matteo Lepore
Centre-left coalition	Italian Socialist Party – Volt	Matteo Lepore
Centre-right coalition	Forza Italia – Union of the Centre	Fabio Battistini
Centre-right coalition	League	Fabio Battistini
Centre-right coalition	Brothers of Italy	Fabio Battistini
Centre-right coalition	Battistini for Mayor – We like Bologna (incl. È, NcI)	Fabio Battistini
Centre-right coalition	The People of the Family	Fabio Battistini
Power to the People		Marta Collot
Stefano Sermenghi for Mayor	Italexit (incl. Vox Italy)	Stefano Sermenghi
Stefano Sermenghi for Mayor	BFC – Bologna Civic Forum	Stefano Sermenghi
3V Movement		Andrea Tosatto
United Left for Bologna (incl. PRC, PCI)		Dora Palumbo
August 24th Movement		Luca Labanti
Workers' Communist Party		Federico Bacchiocchi

== Opinion polls ==
=== Candidates ===
View source data.

Date	Polling firm/ Client	Sample size	Lepore	Battistini	Others	Undecided	Lead
4 October 2021	Election result	-	61.9	29.6	8.5	-	32.3
12–15 Sep 2021	Noto	1,000	60.0	34.0	6.0	22.0	36.0
7–10 Sep 2021	Quorum	805	59.5	32.1	8.4	42.0	27.4
3–8 Sep 2021	Quorum	806	60.1	32.5	4.0–8.0	7.4	27.6
7 Sep 2021	Opinio	—N/a	58.0	37.0	6.0	17.4	21.0
24–26 Aug 2021	BiDiMedia	822	63.5	28.0	8.5	26.0	35.5
13–18 Aug 2021	Winpoll	800	61.6	27.1	11.3	—N/a	34.5
17 Aug 2021	Opinio	—N/a	57.0	38.0	5.0	—N/a	19.0
3–5 Aug 2021	Demopolis	1,502	49.0	36.0	15.0	38.0	13.0

=== Parties ===
View source data.

Date	Polling firm	Sample size	Centre-left					Centre-right				Others	Undecided	Lead
Date	Polling firm	Sample size	PD	M5S	CC	+E–IV	Other	Lega	FI	FdI	Other	Others	Undecided	Lead
4 October 2021	Election result	-	36.5	3.4	7.3	5.7	10.1	7.7	3.8	12.6	4.9	7.9	-	23.9
3–8 Sep 2021	Quorum	806	40.8	8.1	—N/a		11.2	16.3	5.8	11.9	2.2	3.7	34.7	24.5
24–26 Aug 2021	BiDiMedia	822	35.9	5.1	10.4	5.3	7.1	8.3	3.5	13.6	2.7	8.1	23.0	24.8
19–24 Apr 2021	BiDiMedia	1,338	33.2	7.0	12.0	10.7	9.6	3.1	11.1	5.3	7.0	6.1	26.0	22.1
16–19 Sep 2020	Quorum	1,010	38.6	3.0	9.4	4.1	18.9	18.9	8.3	5.6	6.3	5.8	40.0	19.7
5 June 2016	Election result	–	35.5	16.6	13.4			10.3	6.3	2.4	14.3	1.4	–	18.9

== Results ==
Summary of the 2021 Bologna City Council election results
Candidates	1st round		Leader's seats	Parties	Votes	%	Seats
Candidates	Votes	%	Leader's seats	Parties	Votes	%	Seats
Matteo Lepore	94,565	61.90	–	Democratic Party	53,486	36.50	16
Matteo Lepore	94,565	61.90	–	Civic Coalition for Bologna	10,722	7.32	3
Matteo Lepore	94,565	61.90	–	Matteo Lepore for Mayor	9,303	6.35	3
Matteo Lepore	94,565	61.90	–	You Also Count	8,376	5.72	2
Matteo Lepore	94,565	61.90	–	Five Star Movement	4,938	3.37	1
Matteo Lepore	94,565	61.90	–	Green Europe	4,113	2.81	1
Matteo Lepore	94,565	61.90	–	Italian Socialist Party – Volt	1,335	0.91	–
Matteo Lepore	94,565	61.90	–	Total	92,273	62.96	25
Fabio Battistini	45,282	29.64	1	Brothers of Italy	18,514	12.63	5
Fabio Battistini	45,282	29.64	1	League	11,346	7.74	3
Fabio Battistini	45,282	29.64	1	Battistini For Mayor	6,640	4.53	1
Fabio Battistini	45,282	29.64	1	Forza Italia – Union of the Centre	5,561	3.79	1
Fabio Battistini	45,282	29.64	1	The People of the Family	598	0.41	–
Fabio Battistini	45,282	29.64	1	Total	42,659	29.11	10
Marta Collot	3,801	2.49	–	Power to the People	3,355	2.29	–
Stefano Sermenghi	3,053	2.00	–	BFC – Bologna Civic Forum	1,599	1.09	–
Stefano Sermenghi	3,053	2.00	–	Italexit – Civic List for Bologna	1,075	0.73	–
Stefano Sermenghi	3,053	2.00	–	Total	2,674	1.82	–
Andrea Tosatto	2,497	1.63	–	3V Movement	2,428	1.66	–
Dora Palumbo	2,433	1.59	–	United Left – Communist Refoundation – PCI	2,144	1.46	–
Federico Bacchiocchi	625	0.41	–	Workers' Communist Party	597	0.41	–
Luca Labanti	508	0.33	–	August 24th Movement	423	0.29	–
Total	152.764	100.00	1		146,553	100.00	35
Source: Ministry of the Interior

Notes: if a defeated candidate for Mayor obtained over 3% of votes, he/she is automatically elected communal councilor (Battistini); see Italian electoral law of 1993 for Comuni. The candidate elected Mayor is not a member of communal council, but Merola votes in the communal council (see Italian electoral law 1993).

Popular vote
PD	36.50%
FdI	12.63%
Lega	7.74%
CC	7.32%
Lepore	6.35%
ATC	5.72%
Battistini	4.53%
FI	3.79%
M5S	3.37%
EV	2.81%
PaP	2.29%
M3V	1.66%
SU	1.46%
Others	3.83%

Mayor
Lepore	61.90%
Battistini	29.64%
Collot	2.49%
Sermenghi	2.00%
Tosatto	1.63%
Palumbo	1.59%
Bacchiocchi	0.41%
Labanti	0.33%

Seats summary
Centre-left	69.44%
Centre-right	30.56%

== See also ==
- 2021 Italian local elections
