= 2011 Bologna municipal election =

← 2009	15–16 May 2011	2016 →
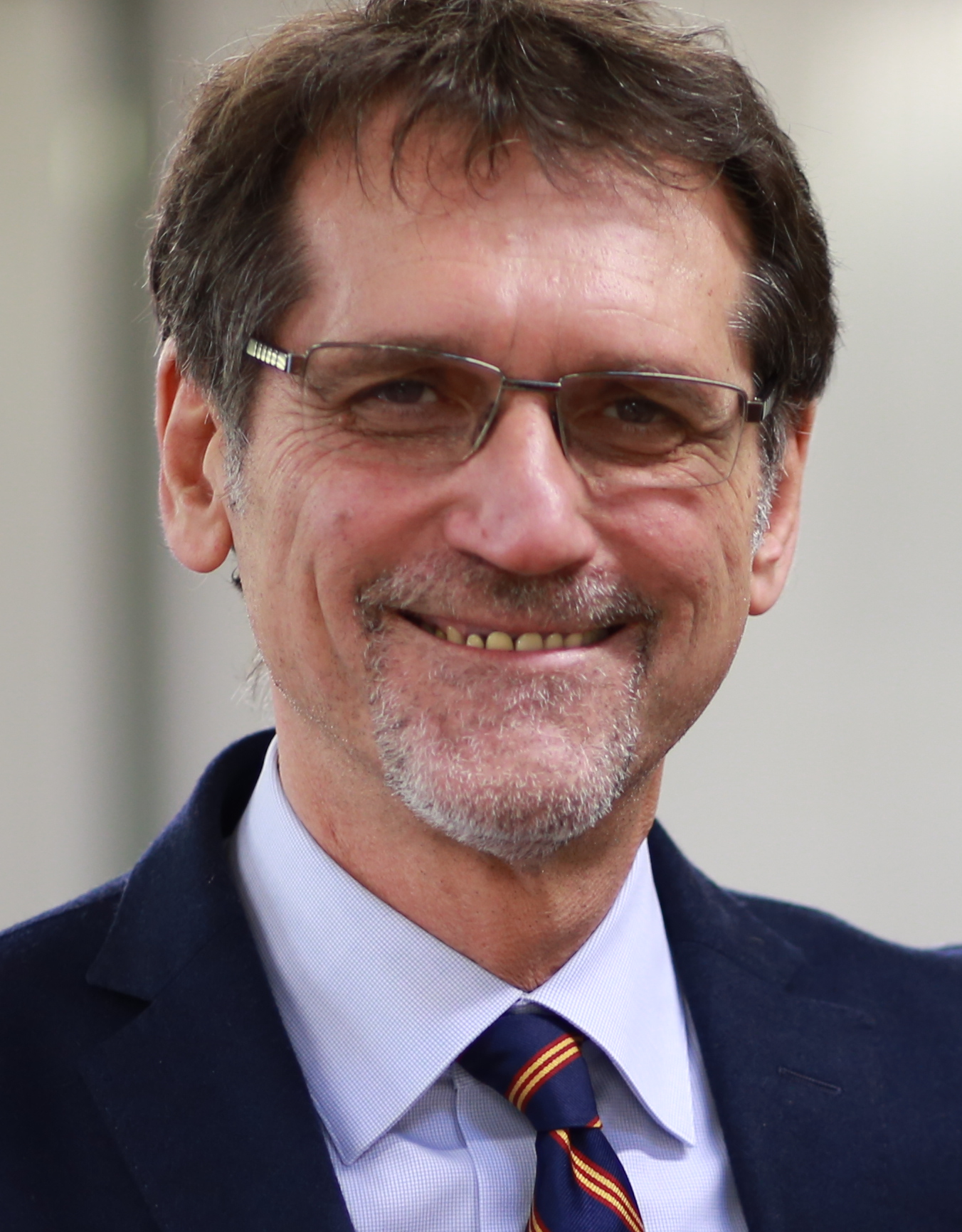

Candidate	Virginio Merola	Manes Bernardini
Party	Democratic Party	Northern League
Alliance	Centre-left	Centre-right
Popular vote	106,070	63,799
Percentage	50.47%	30.35%
- Composition of the Bologna City Council
Mayor before election
Flavio Delbono
Democratic Party
Elected mayor
Virginio Merola
Democratic Party

Municipal elections were held in Bologna on 15 and 16 May 2011. The centre-left candidate Virginio Merola was elected mayor at the first round with 50.47% of votes. The turnout was just 71%, a decrease compared to 2009 and 2004 elections.

== Background ==
The election took place before the end of the legislature because the incumbent mayor Flavio Delbono, who was under investigation after the Cinziagate scandal. Delbono was forced to announce his resignation as mayor on 25 January 2010 following the revelation that he was being investigated for crimes such as embezzlement, fraud and aggravated abuse of office. The investigation followed Delbono's former assistant's claim that he had spent public money on her— the pair had been having an affair. Investigators subsequently questioned Delbono about the purchase of a property near St. Julian's, Malta. Delbono denied all the allegations made against him and said that resigning as mayor was the right thing to do. He has announced that he will return to lecturing and is working to clear his name. His resignation was confirmed on 28 January following the approval of an emergency budget, the election to appoint Delbono's successor must take place by 28 March 2010.

For 15 months, Bologna was governed under a special commissioner, Anna Maria Cancellieri, an exceptional event in post-war Italian politics.

== Voting system ==
The voting system is used for all mayoral elections in Italy, in the city with a population higher than 15,000 inhabitants. Under this system voters express a direct choice for the mayor or an indirect choice voting for the party of the candidate's coalition. If no candidate receives 50% of votes, the top two candidates go to a second round after two weeks. This gives a result whereby the winning candidate may be able to claim majority support, although it is not guaranteed.

The election of the City Council is based on a direct choice for the candidate with a preference vote: the candidate with the majority of the preferences is elected. The number of the seats for each party is determined proportionally.

== Parties and leaders ==
Political force or alliance	Constituent lists	Leader
Centre-left coalition	Democratic Party	Virginio Merola
Centre-left coalition	With Amelia for Bologna	Virginio Merola
Centre-left coalition	Italy of Values	Virginio Merola
Centre-left coalition	Federation of the Left	Virginio Merola
Centre-left coalition	Italian Socialist Party	Virginio Merola
Five Star Movement	Five Star Movement	Massimo Bugani
Stefano Aldrovandi Mayor	Stefano Aldrovandi Mayor (incl. UDC and FLI)	Stefano Aldrovandi
Bologna Capital	Bologna Capital	Daniele Corticelli
Bologna Capital	The Populars of Italy Tomorrow	Daniele Corticelli
Bologna Capital	Italian Republican Party	Daniele Corticelli
Bologna Capital	Acting Together Civically	Daniele Corticelli
Centre-right coalition	The People of Freedom	Manes Bernardini
Centre-right coalition	Northern League	Manes Bernardini

== Results ==
Summary of the 2011 Bologna City Council election results
Candidates	Votes	%	Leaders seats	Parties	Votes	%	Seats
Virginio Merola	106,070	50.47	–	Democratic Party	72,335	38.28	17
Virginio Merola	106,070	50.47	–	With Amelia for Bologna	19,358	10.24	4
Virginio Merola	106,070	50.47	–	Italy of Values	6,983	3.70	1
Virginio Merola	106,070	50.47	–	Federation of the Left	2,766	1.46	–
Virginio Merola	106,070	50.47	–	Lay Socialists Reformists	1,118	0.59	–
Manes Bernardini	63,799	30.35	1	The People of Freedom	31,374	16.60	6
Manes Bernardini	63,799	30.35	1	Northern League	20,268	10.72	3
Massimo Bugani	19,969	9.50	1	Five Star Movement	17,778	9.41	2
Stefano Aldrovandi	10,679	5.08	1	Stefano Aldrovandi for Mayor	8,961	4.74	–
Daniele Corticelli	6,442	3.06	–	Bologna Capital	4,546	2.41	–
Daniele Corticelli	6,442	3.06	–	The Populars of Italy Tomorrow	328	0.17	–
Daniele Corticelli	6,442	3.06	–	Italian Republican Party	251	0.13	–
Daniele Corticelli	6,442	3.06	–	Acting Together Civically	201	0.11	–
Michele Terra	1,601	0.76	–	Workers' Communist Party	1,125	0.60	–
Elisabetta Avanzi	654	0.31	–	New Force	603	0.32	–
Anna Montella	580	0.28	–	The Right	602	0.32	–
Angelo Maria Carcano	391	0.19	–	Neptune List	387	0.20	–
Total	210,185	100.00	3		188,984	100.00	33
Source: Ministry of the Interior

Popular vote
PD	38.28%
PdL	16.60%
LN	10.72%
SEL	10.24%
M5S	9.41%
SAS	4.74%
IdV	3.70%
BC	2.41%
Others	3.90%

Mayor
Merola	50.47%
Bernardini	30.35%
Bugani	9.50%
Aldrovandi	5.08%
Corticelli	3.06%
Others	1.54%
