= Nitto Francesco Palma =

Italian politician

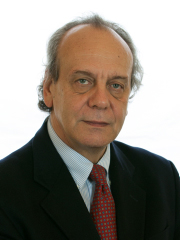

Minister of Justice
- In office 27 July 2011 – 16 November 2011
- Prime Minister: Silvio Berlusconi
- Preceded by: Angelino Alfano
- Succeeded by: Paola Severino

Member of the Senate
- In office 28 April 2006 – 22 March 2018

Member of the Chamber of Deputies
- In office 30 May 2001 – 27 April 2006

Personal details
- Born: 3 March 1950 (age 76) Rome, Italy
- Party: Forza Italia
- Profession: Politician, Magistrate

Benedetto "Nitto" Francesco Palma (born 3 March 1950 in Rome) is an Italian politician and magistrate. From July to November 2011 he served as Minister of Justice in the Berlusconi fourth government.

== Biography ==
He was Judge instructor in Vicenza until 1979; from 1979 to 1993 he was deputy Prosecutor of the Republic in Rome.

In 1994 he was deputy head of the cabinet of the Minister of Justice Alfredo Biondi. He was then deputy Prosecutor in the National Antimafia Directorate.

In 2001 he has been elected to the Chamber of Deputies in the uninominal constituency of Oderzo. From 2006 to 2018 he served instead as a Senator. In 2011 he was appointed Minister of Justice in place of Angelino Alfano, who became the Secretary of The People of Freedom.

In the 2018 general election he has not been re-elected.
