= Paola Severino =

Italian lawyer, academic and politician

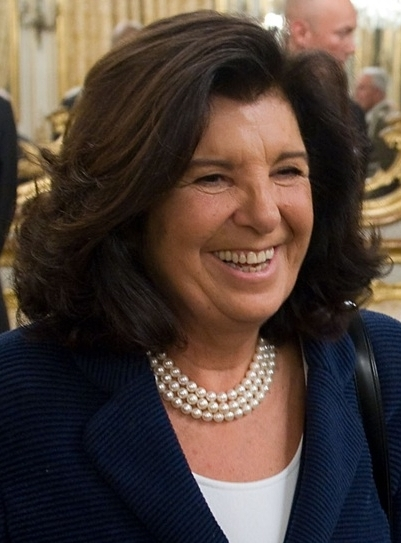

Minister of Justice
- In office 16 November 2011 – 28 April 2013
- Prime Minister: Mario Monti
- Preceded by: Nitto Francesco Palma
- Succeeded by: Anna Maria Cancellieri

Personal details
- Born: 22 October 1948 (age 77) Naples, Italy
- Party: Independent
- Education: Sapienza University

Paola Severino (born 22 October 1948) is an Italian lawyer, academic and politician. She served as Minister of Justice in the Monti cabinet from November 2011 to April 2013, being the first woman appointed Minister of Justice in Italian history. On 3 October 2016, she was nominated rector of Libera Università Internazionale degli Studi Sociali Guido Carli.

== Early life and education ==
Severino was born in Naples in 1948. She studied law at La Sapienza University of Rome and graduated in 1971. She is married to former CONSOB executive Paolo Di Benedetto, with whom she had a daughter. Severino is an amputee, having lost her right arm due to an illness.

== Career ==
Severino began her career as a researcher at the Consiglio Nazionale delle Ricerche (National Council of Research) in 1972, and worked there until 1975. She then worked as an assistant professor at La Sapienza from 1975 to 1987. Later she began to work at Perugia University and taught penal commercial law at the Faculty of Economics. She was appointed vice president of the Superior Council of Military Magistracy in 1997. She was the first Italian woman appointed this post. Her tenure lasted until 2002. In addition, Severino worked with Giovanni Maria Flick, former President of the Italian Constitutional Court.

Severino is among top criminal lawyers in Italy. One of her clients was the former Italian Prime Minister Romano Prodi. Other prominent individual clients of Severino include Cesare Geronzi and Francesco Caltagirone whom she defended in the Cirio trial. Italian energy giant Eni was another client of Severino. She served as the head of the department of law at LUISS Guido Carli University in Rome from 2003 to 2006. Before her appointment as minister of justice, she was working as a professor of penal law at the School for Carabinieri Officers and a Pro-Rector Vicar at LUISS Guido Carli University.

Severino was appointed minister of justice on 16 November 2011. Her income in 2011 was more than seven million euros, making her the top rich minister in the Monti cabinet. Her tenure ended in April 2013. Anna Maria Cancellieri replaced her as justice minister. From 2018 to 2020, she was Special Representative of the President-in-Office of the Organization for Security and Cooperation in Europe (OSCE) for the fight against corruption, a position established by the Italian Presidency of the organization in 2018

Political offices
Preceded by Nitto Francesco Palma	Minister of Justice; 2011–2013	Succeeded by Anna Maria Cancellieri
