= Renzo Imbeni =

Italian politician (1944–2005)

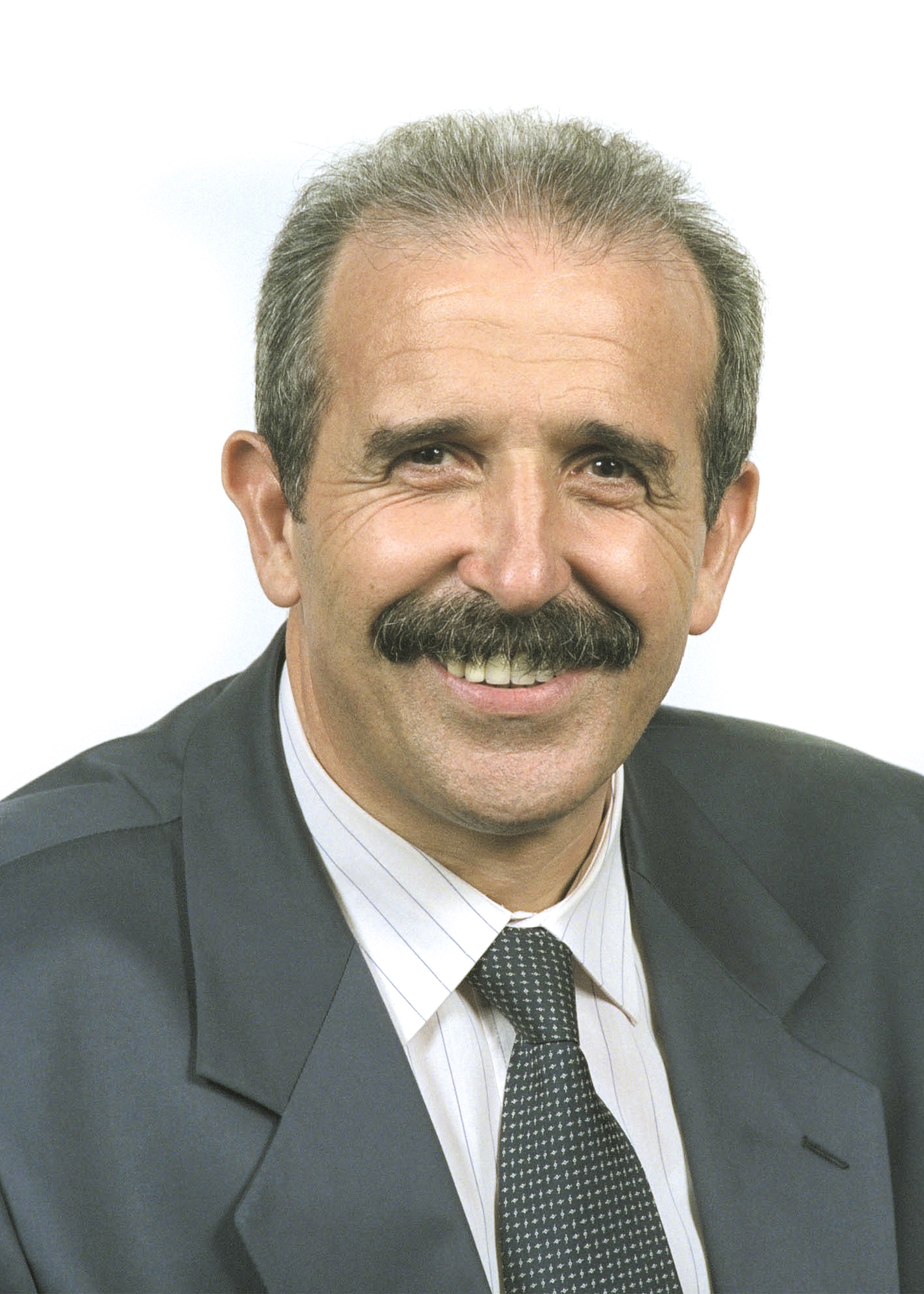

Mayor of Bologna
- In office 29 April 1983 – 27 February 1993
- Preceded by: Renato Zangheri
- Succeeded by: Walter Vitali

Member of the European Parliament
- In office 18 July 1989 – 13 July 2004
- Constituency: North-East Italy

Personal details
- Born: 12 October 1944 Modena, Italy
- Died: 22 February 2005 (aged 60) Bologna, Italy
- Party: PCI (until 1991); PDS (1991-1998); DS (1998-2005)
- Education: University of Bologna
- Occupation: Politician
- Renzo Imbeni's voice Imbeni nominating the port of Salento for the 1999 Nobel Peace Prize; Recorded 25 February 1999

Renzo Imbeni (12 October 1944 – 22 February 2005) was an Italian politician who was Mayor of Bologna from 1983 to 1993.

== Biography ==
Imbeni graduated in economics at the University of Bologna and in 1972 he was elected Secretary of the Italian Communist Youth Federation, the youth association of the Italian Communist Party.

From 1976 to 1983, Imbeni was the city secretary of the PCI in Bologna, until he was appointed Mayor of Bologna after the resignation of his predecessor Renato Zangheri who was elected to the Chamber of Deputies.

Imbeni's administration dealt with the consequences of the Years of Lead attacks in Bologna, pursuing the idea of the city as a "happy island" during very difficult times.

Imbeni upheld the rights of women and homosexuals, arguing that democracy should be based on differences and the plurality of voices.

From 1989 to 2004, Imbeni was elected to the European Parliament, serving as vice-president of the European Parliament from 1994 to 2004.

Imbeni died on 22 February 2005 at the age of 60, after a long illness.
