= Guido Fanti =

Italian politician (1925–2012)

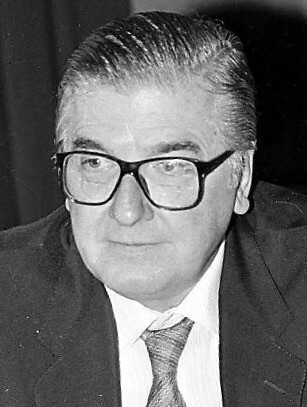

Member of the European Parliament
- In office 17 July 1979 – 24 July 1989
- Constituency: North-East Italy

President of Emilia-Romagna
- In office 28 July 1970 – 21 May 1976
- Preceded by: Office established
- Succeeded by: Sergio Cavina

Mayor of Bologna
- In office 2 April 1966 – 29 July 1970
- Preceded by: Giuseppe Dozza
- Succeeded by: Renato Zangheri

Personal details
- Born: 12 May 1925 Bologna, Italy
- Died: 11 February 2012 (aged 86) Bologna, Italy
- Party: Italian Communist Party
- Profession: Politician

Guido Fanti (27 May 1925 – 11 February 2012) was an Italian politician. From 1979 to 1989, he served as a Member of the European Parliament (MEP). He was a member of the Italian Communist Party.

== Biography ==
Fanti was born in 1925. He enrolled at the university but was forced to leave it during the Second World War. He was called to arms in 1943 but soon joined the partisan resistance. In 1945, after the liberation of Bologna, he joined the Italian Communist Party. He became provincial secretary of the PCI fifteen years later. In 1960 he also entered the central committee of the party, where he was reconfirmed in the following two congresses, and in 1965, at the XI congress, a member of the national directorate.

Fanti was elected city councilor of Bologna in 1957; on 2 April 1966 he was elected mayor of the city, when Giuseppe Dozza resigned for health reasons, after having brought the semi-destroyed city from war to reconstruction, and the economic and social recovery started. During his mandate, the PEEP public housing plan and the construction of the "Fiera District" (based on a project by architect Kenzō Tange) were approved.

On 29 July 1970, Guido Fanti resigned from office because he was elected the first president of the Emilia-Romagna Region. He then renounced his regional mandate as he was a member of the Chamber of Deputies from 1976 to 1983. In 1983, he was elected senator of the IX legislature and remained in office until 1987. From 1979 until 1989, he was a member of the European Parliament, of which he became vice president in 1984.

Guido Fanti died in the night between 10 and 11 February 2012.
