= Flavio Delbono =

Italian politician and economist (born 1959)

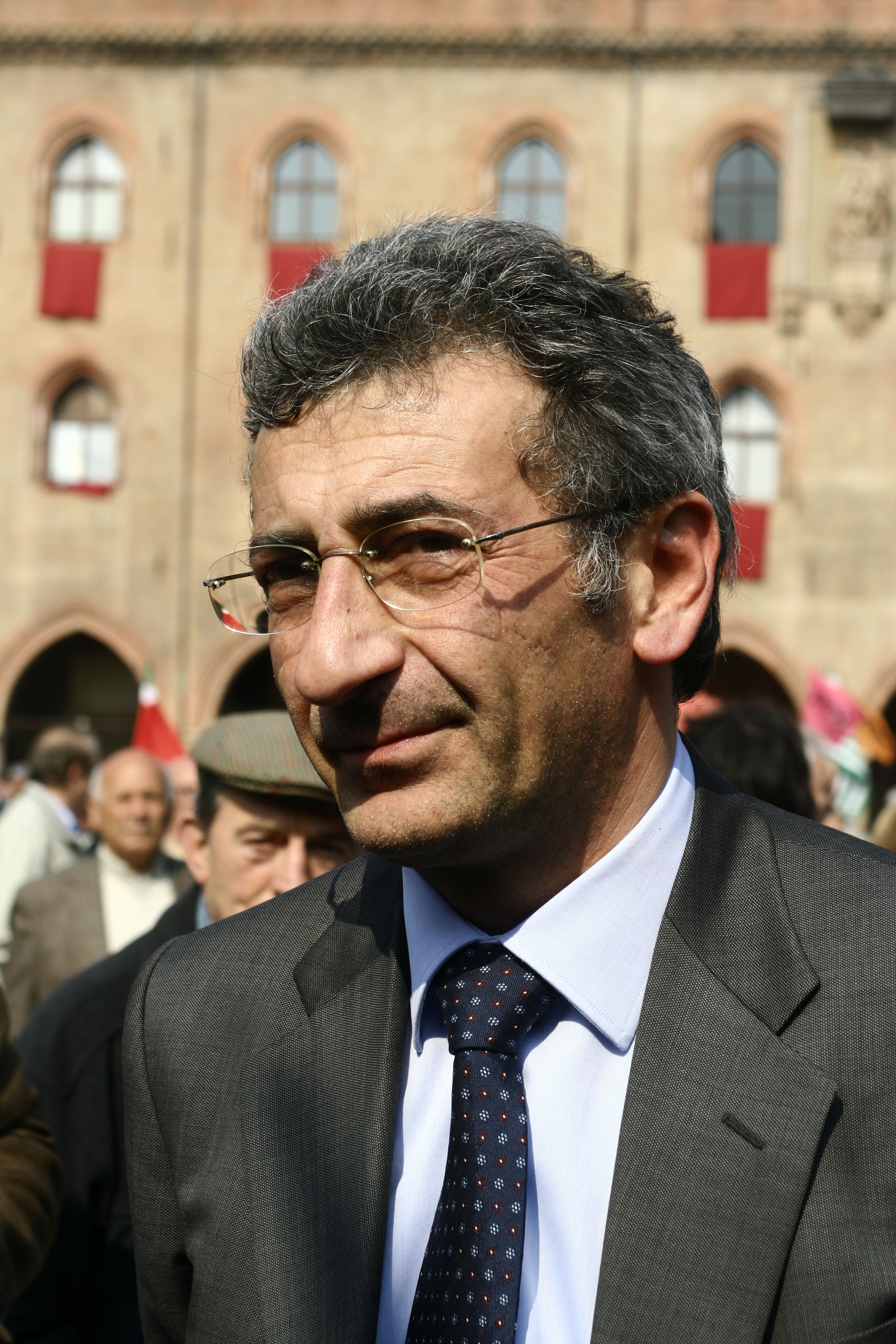

Mayor of Bologna
- In office 25 June 2009 – 17 February 2010
- Preceded by: Sergio Cofferati
- Succeeded by: Virginio Merola

Vice-President of Emilia-Romagna
- In office 2003–2009
- Preceded by: Vera Zamagni
- Succeeded by: Maria Giuseppina Muzzarelli

Personal details
- Born: 17 September 1959 (age 66) Sabbioneta, Lombardy, Italy
- Party: Democratic Party

Flavio Delbono (born 17 September 1959) is an Italian politician and economist. He served as the mayor of Bologna from 25 June 2009 until 28 January 2010, when he was forced to resign as he was being investigated for crimes such as embezzlement, fraud and aggravated abuse of office following allegations made by his former lover.

== Biography ==
Delbono was born in Sabbioneta, a small town in the Province of Mantua in Lombardy. His father was a municipal policeman and his mother was a seamstress. After graduating from the Liceo scientifico, Delbono studied economics at the University of Parma, graduating in 1982. He received a dottorato di ricerca in economics from the University of Siena in 1986, and a D.Phil. from Linacre College, Oxford in 1988. While at Oxford, Delbono studied under the future Nobel laureate Amartya Sen.

Delbono joined the faculty of the Johns Hopkins University SAIS Bologna Center as an adjunct professor of international economics in 1987. In 1992, at the age of 33, Delbono was appointed as professor of Political Economy at the University of Bologna. His predecessors in this position include Romano Prodi and Stefano Zamagni.

== Political and administrative career ==
From 1995 to 1999, Delbono served as an assessor for the city of Bologna with specific responsibility for the budget. In 2000, the newly elected President of the Emilia-Romagna region, Vasco Errani, named Delbono as the regional assessor for finance and organisation. In 2003 he was also named as vice-president of Emilia-Romagna. Following Errani's re-election in May 2005, Delbono was reconfirmed as vice-president and given additional responsibility for the region's relationship with Europe.

On 19 June 2008, Delbono was unanimously elected in Brussels as the President of the Lisbon Regions Network—a 15-member pan-European group concerned with implementing the Lisbon Strategy.

== Primary campaign ==
On 13 October 2008, Delbono announced his intention to stand in the Democratic Party primary election for mayor of Bologna. Delbono's candidacy was backed by several prominent figures in Bolognese politics, including: Sergio Cofferati, Romano Prodi, Pier Luigi Bersani, Renato Zangheri and Salvatore Caronna.

The primary elections took place on 13 and 14 December 2008. Delbono received 49.73% of the 24,920 votes cast in the primary; Maurizio Cevenini received 23.29%, Virginio Merola received 21.44% and Andrea Forlani received 5.1%.

== Campaign for mayor of Bologna ==
On 9 January 2009, Delbono announced that he would be resigning as vice-president of Emilia-Romagna and regional assessor in order to focus on his election campaign. Maria Giuseppina Muzzarelli was announced as his successor as vice-president on 3 February. The mayoral election was held on 21 and 22 June; Delbono's opponents included Alfredo Cazzola, the candidate of The People of Freedom and Lega Nord, and the UDC's Giorgio Guazzaloca, a former mayor of Bologna. Delbono received 49.4% of the vote in the first round, forcing a second round against Cazzola, who had received 29.1%. Delbono received 60.67% of the votes in the second round. Delbono was officially proclaimed as mayor of the city of Bologna on 25 June 2009.

== Scandal and resignation ==
Delbono was forced to announce his resignation as mayor on 25 January 2010 following the revelation that he was being investigated for crimes such as embezzlement, fraud and aggravated abuse of office. The investigation followed Delbono's former assistant's claim that he had spent public money on her— the pair had been having an affair. Investigators subsequently questioned Delbono about the purchase of a property near St. Julian's, Malta. Delbono denied all the allegations made against him and said that resigning as mayor was the right thing to do. He has announced that he will return to lecturing and is working to clear his name. His resignation was confirmed on 28 January following the approval of an emergency budget, the election to appoint Delbono's successor must take place by 28 March 2010.

However, Bologna did not receive a mayor until 2011, and was ruled by a commissioner, Anna Maria Cancellieri.
