= Luigi Pizzardi =

Italian politician

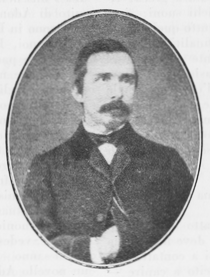
Photographic portrait of Luigi Pizzardi (1815-1871)

Luigi Pizzardi (October 31, 1815 – September 3, 1871) was an Italian politician.

Pizzardi was born in Castelmaggiore, into a rich Bolognese land-owning family. From 1846 he was among the leading politicians of Bologna, and was the first mayor of the city. In 1859 he was appointed Senator of the Kingdom, but did not participate in the activities of the Senate. He donated substantial assets to the Ospedale Maggiore (Main Hospital of Bologna) to build today's Bellaria hospital. He died in Bologna, aged 55.

In 1920, his heirs donated to the Rigatoni Museum and the Gallery of Modern Art (Bologna) a few great nineteenth- century paintings that had adorned the famous Salone del Risorgimento which Pizzardi wanted in his palace. The family Pizzardi archive is in Bologna at Palazzo Ratta, via Castiglione 29.
