= 2016 Bologna municipal election =

← 2011	5 and 19 June 2016	2021 →
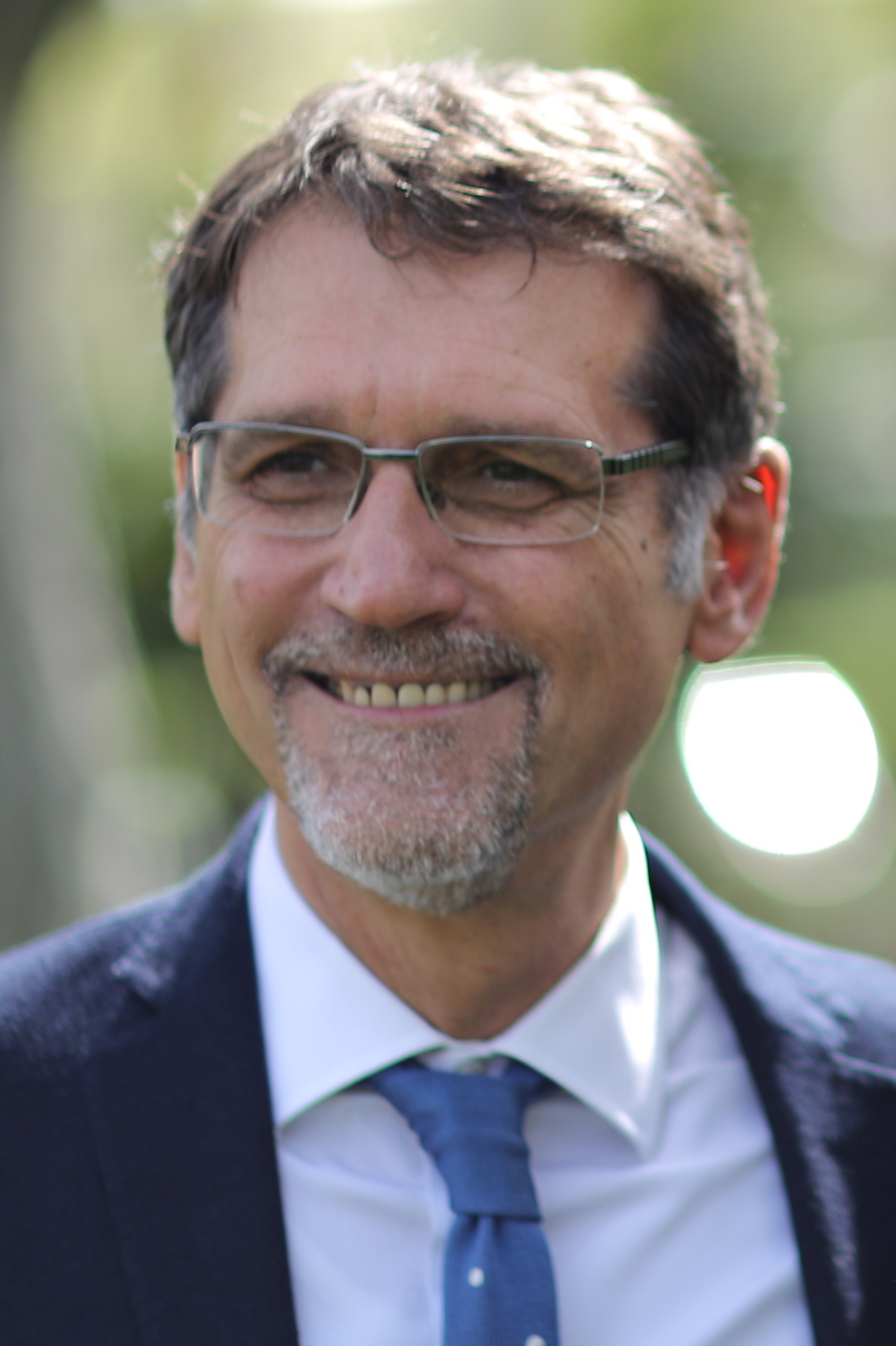

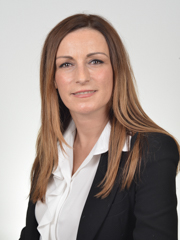
Candidate	Virginio Merola	Lucia Borgonzoni
Party	Democratic Party	Northern League
Alliance	Centre-left	Centre-right
Popular vote	68,749	38,806
Percentage	39.46%	22.27%
Popular vote (2nd)	83,907	69,660
Percentage (2nd)	54.64%	45.36%
Mayor before election
Virginio Merola
Democratic Party
Elected mayor
Virginio Merola
Democratic Party

Municipal elections were held in Bologna on 5 and 19 June 2016. The centre-left candidate Virginio Merola was elected mayor at the second round with 54.64% of votes.

== Voting system ==
The voting system is used for all mayoral elections in Italy, in the city with a population higher than 15,000 inhabitants. Under this system voters express a direct choice for the mayor or an indirect choice voting for the party of the candidate's coalition. If no candidate receives 50% of votes, the top two candidates go to a second round after two weeks. This gives a result whereby the winning candidate may be able to claim majority support, although it is not guaranteed.

The election of the City Council is based on a direct choice for the candidate with a preference vote: the candidate with the majority of the preferences is elected. The number of the seats for each party is determined proportionally.

== Parties and candidates ==
This is a list of the parties (and their respective leaders) which will participate in the election.

Political force or alliance	Constituent lists	Leader
Centre-left coalition	Democratic Party	Virginio Merola
Centre-left coalition	Common City with Amelia	Virginio Merola
Centre-left coalition	Bologna Alive	Virginio Merola
Centre-left coalition	Citizens for Bologna	Virginio Merola
Centre-left coalition	Bologna metropolitan hits the mark	Virginio Merola
Centre-right coalition	Northern League	Lucia Borgonzoni
Centre-right coalition	Forza Italia	Lucia Borgonzoni
Centre-right coalition	United We Win	Lucia Borgonzoni
Centre-right coalition	Brothers of Italy	Lucia Borgonzoni
Centre-right coalition	Let's take back Bologna	Lucia Borgonzoni
Five Star Movement	Five Star Movement	Massimo Bugani
Popular Area	Together Bologna	Manes Bernardini
Left-wing coalition	Civic Coalition (incl. SEL and Possible)	Federico Martelloni
Federation of the Greens	Federation of the Greens	Matteo Badiali
Workers' Communist Party	Workers' Communist Party	Ermanno Lorenzoni
The People of the Family	The People of the Family	Mirko De Carli
Justice Honor Freedom	Justice Honor Freedom	Sergio Celloni

== Results ==
Summary of the 2016 Bologna City Council election results
Candidates	1st round		2nd round		Leaders seats	Parties	Votes	%	Seats
Candidates	Votes	%	Votes	%	Leaders seats	Parties	Votes	%	Seats
Virginio Merola	68,772	39.48	83,907	54.64	–	Democratic Party	60,066	35.46	21
Virginio Merola	68,772	39.48	83,907	54.64	–	Common City with Amelia	4,917	2.90	1
Virginio Merola	68,772	39.48	83,907	54.64	–	Federation of the Greens (A)	2,574	1.52	–
Virginio Merola	68,772	39.48	83,907	54.64	–	Bologna Alive	1,416	0.84	–
Virginio Merola	68,772	39.48	83,907	54.64	–	Citizens for Bologna	1,325	0.78	–
Virginio Merola	68,772	39.48	83,907	54.64	–	Bologna metropolitan hits the mark	487	0.29	–
Lucia Borgonzoni	38,807	22.28	69,660	45.36	1	Northern League	17,376	10.26	3
Lucia Borgonzoni	38,807	22.28	69,660	45.36	1	Forza Italia	10,614	6.27	2
Lucia Borgonzoni	38,807	22.28	69,660	45.36	1	United We Win	4,176	2.47	–
Lucia Borgonzoni	38,807	22.28	69,660	45.36	1	Brothers of Italy	4,073	2.40	–
Lucia Borgonzoni	38,807	22.28	69,660	45.36	1	Let's take back Bologna	1,025	0.61	–
Massimo Bugani	28,889	16.59	–	–	1	Five Star Movement	28,115	16.60	3
Manes Bernardini	18,188	10.44	–	–	1	Together Bologna	16,844	9.94	1
Federico Martelloni	12,188	7.00	–	–	1	Civic Coalition	12,017	7.09	1
Matteo Badiali	2,645	1.52	–	–	–	Federation of the Greens	2,569	1.51	–
Ermanno Lorenzoni	2,178	1.25	–	–	–	Workers' Communist Party	1,869	1.10	–
Mirko De Carli	2,074	1.19	–	–	–	The People of the Family	2,087	1.23	–
Sergio Celloni	446	0.26	–	–	–	Justice Honor Freedom	428	0.25	–
Total	174,187	100.00	153,567	100.00	4		169,409	100.00	32
Source: Ministry of the Interior

Notes: if a defeated candidate for Mayor obtained over 3% of votes, the mayoral candidate is automatically elected communal councilor (Borgonzoni, Bugani, Bernardini and Martelloni); see Italian electoral law of 1993 for Comuni. The candidate elected Mayor is not a member of communal council, but Merola votes in the communal council (see Italian electoral law 1993).

Popular vote
PD	35.44%
M5S	16.60%
LN	10.25%
IB	9.94%
CC	7.09%
FI	6.26%
CCA	2.89%
UV	2.45%
FdI	2.41%
Others	6.67%

Mayor (1st round)
Merola	39.46%
Borgonzoni	22.27%
Bugani	16.19%
Bernardini	10.43%
Martelloni	7.00%
Others	4.65%

Mayor (2nd round)
Merola	54.64%
Borgonzoni	45.36%
