= Giorgio Guazzaloca =

Italian politician (1944–2017)

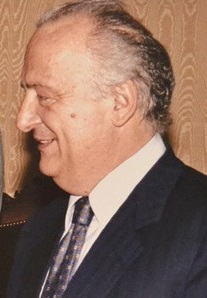

Mayor of Bologna
- In office 30 June 1999 – 14 June 2004
- Preceded by: Walter Vitali
- Succeeded by: Sergio Cofferati

Personal details
- Born: 6 February 1944 Bazzano, Italy
- Died: 26 April 2017 (aged 73) Bologna, Italy
- Occupation: Politician, butcher

Giorgio Guazzaloca (6 February 1944 – 26 April 2017) was an Italian politician. He was the mayor of Bologna from 1999 to 2004.

== Biography ==
Guazzaloca left school when he was 14 and started working in his father's butcher's shop, opening one of his own in 1965. From 1985 to 1999, Guazzaloca was the president of the Italian General Confederation of Enterprises office of Bologna, and was president of the Chamber of Commerce, Industry, Agriculture and Artisanship from 1991 to 1998.

=== Mayor of Bologna ===
On 19 December 1998, Guazzaloca announced his independent candidacy for the office of mayor of Bologna as part of the centre-right coalition, receiving support from the Pole for Freedoms. In June 1999, in an upset, Guazzaloca won the runoff against The Olive Tree candidate and became the first centre-right mayor of Bologna since the end of World War II. He declared that he wanted a city guided not on the basis of political ideologies but exclusively on the basis of the interests of the people of Bologna. Guazzaloca tried to run for a second term in 2004 but was defeated in the first round by The Union candidate Sergio Cofferati.

=== Later life and death ===
In 2005, Guazzaloca became a member of the Italian Competition Authority. Guazzaloca tried one more time to run for the office of mayor of Bologna in 2009 with his own civic list, ranking third. He died in the Sant’Orsola-Malpighi Polyclinic in Bologna on 26 April 2017, at the age of 73, after having fought for years against multiple myeloma.
