= Renato Zangheri =

Italian politician (1925–2015)

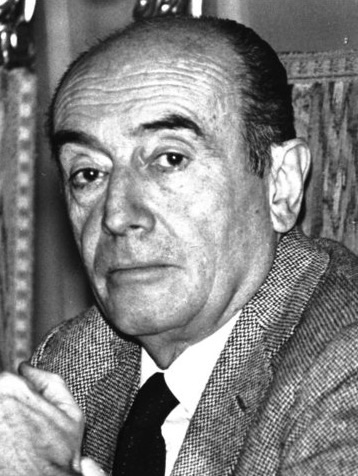

Mayor of Bologna
- In office 29 July 1970 – 29 April 1983
- Preceded by: Guido Fanti
- Succeeded by: Renzo Imbeni

Member of the Chamber of Deputies
- In office 12 July 1983 – 22 April 1992
- Constituency: Bologna

Personal details
- Born: 8 April 1925 Rimini, Emilia-Romagna, Kingdom of Italy
- Died: 6 August 2015 (aged 90) Imola, Emilia-Romagna, Italy
- Party: PCI (1944–91); PDS (1991–98); DS (1998–2007); PD (from 2007)
- Spouse: Claudia dall'Osso (m. 1992)
- Children: 1
- Education: University of Bologna
- Occupation: Politician, academic

Renato Zangheri (8 April 1925 – 6 August 2015) was an Italian politician, who was Mayor of Bologna from 1970 to 1983 and Member of the Chamber of Deputies from 1983 to 1992.

== Early life and political activity ==
Zangheri was born in Rimini on 8 April 1925. He attended the city's classical lyceum, and was a tennis partner of Clara Petacci, mistress of Benito Mussolini, during her stays at the Grand Hotel Rimini.

Zangheri joined the Italian Communist Party (PCI) in 1944. In 1946, he codirected Città Nuova, a weekly newspaper dedicated to discussing the city's post-war reconstruction. Sitting on boards of the local party, Zangheri was concerned by its intake of intellectual socialists unable to respond to the acute socio-economic crises of the time.

Zangheri studied with the Faculty of Literature and Philosophy at the University of Bologna, graduating with a thesis on the problems and aspects of Italian socialism. Among his teachers were Felice Battaglia, who wrote that Zangheri had "the religious sense of culture" in a 1948 letter.

Emilio Sereni, the PCI's cultural director, had requested that Zangheri be transferred to Rome after his university studies to work in the party's cultural office, but the transfer was continually postponed and never realised. Instead, Zangheri assisted the historian Luigi Dal Pane, who had invited Zangheri to the University of Perugia to assist his course in economic history. Zangheri joined the editorial committee of Movimento operaio, a Marxist historiographic journal founded in 1949, and also directed the magazines Emilia and Stuidi Storici; the latter was run by the Istituto Gramsci.

== Academic career ==
Zangheri obtained a teaching qualification that elevated him to the university professorship in 1960. In 1962, he won a competition for the professorship of economic history at the University of Trieste, moving to Bologna in 1965 as professor of history of economic doctrine.

Zangheri's research concerned the distribution of land ownership in 19th and 19th centuries, land registers as historical sources, the thought of the Physiocrats, income distribution during pre-capitalist development, and the history of socialism. His writings on socialism included studies on Antonio Gramsci and Andrea Còsta. Zangheri lectured at the universities of Reading, Barcelona, Columbia, New York, Yale, and Harvard.

After his political career, Zangheri returned to university teaching. He was rector at the University of San Marino from 1991 to 1994. In 1998, the Ministry of Cultural Heritage appointed Zangheri as president of the scientific commission for a national edition of Gramsci's works; he resigned in 2000.

Among Zangheri's most popular publications is a history of Italian socialism published by Einaudi, the first volume of which was published in 1993. Zangheri was for a time president of the Istituto Gramsci.

== Political career ==
=== City councillor and mayor ===
Gramsci was elected for the first time to the city council of Bologna in 1956. Following the Hungarian Revolution of 1956, Zangheri cosigned an appeal from historians endorsing Giuseppe Di Vittorio's support for the striking workers, against the beliefs of the PCI's leadership. From 1960 to 1964, Zangheri was responsible for the city's cultural institutions, only recently transferred from the competence of the city's superintendence.

On 29 July 1970, Zangheri was elected mayor of Bologna, and would be reelected in 1975 and 1980. Zangheri guided the city throughout the difficult Years of Lead. The city faced the Italicus Express bombing by a fascist group (4 August 1974), the social unrest that followed the carabinieri's murder of activist Francesco Lorusso (11 March 1977), the crash of Itavia Flight 870 after leaving Bologna airport (27 June 1980), and the massacre at Bologna Centrale railway station (2 August 1980).

Amid this polarised political climate, Zangheri advocated compromising with the burgeoning youth movement, particularly through civil society. He organised cultural and musical events, bringing The Clash to perform in Bologna, and Carmelo Bene to speak at the Two Towers. He promoted political participation, especially among young people. The policy allowed him to navigate the tension between the traditional communists in the PCI's leadership and the progressive communists from the new students' movements of the 1960. Under his leadership, Bologna opened Italy's first gay community centre, the Cassero, against the wish of the central party. While Zangheri bemoaned how Bologna was a net fiscal contributor and deprived of its full funding by the central government, the council was recognised for its administrative efficiency.

Despite this, Zangheri was sometimes vilified by Bologna's citizens, especially by young people out on the streets during the social unrest in 1977, when he was regularly met with a popular protest chant of "Zangherì, Zangherà". Reflecting on his time in office thirty years later, Zangheri said that the PCI made mistakes and failed to "understand much about those young people", and he chose "excessive rigidity" because he "couldn't choose otherwise".

In January 1971, Zangheri organised a series of events and meetings celebrating the fiftieth anniversary of the Italian Communist Party. In 1979, he was appointed a member of the national party's leadership. He was considered a possible successor to Enrico Berlinguer for the PCI's leadership in 1984, but lost to Alessandro Natta.

=== Deputy ===
Zangheri resigned as mayor of Bologna on 24 April 1983, when the PCI nominated him as candidate for the Chamber of Deputies. He was elected at the 1983 general election, and reelected in the 1987 general election. From 1986 to 1990, Zangheri was the group leader of the Italian Communist Party in the chamber; his resignation, on grounds of ill health, surprised the party's secretariat, but was also perceived as symptomatic of growing discontent with him from other parliamentarians and the broader decline of the party. Zangheri joined the Democratic Party of the Left in 1991, followed by the Democrats of the Left.

As deputy, Zangheri supported the separation of the province of Rimini from the province of Forlì. While many municipalities tabled bills supporting their separation from existing provinces, Zangheri formed a coalition among municipalities that he thought had more legitimate claims; at the same time, he leveraged the usual fruitlessness of these requests to convince the province of Forlì to endorse Rimini's request. He intervened in favour of further environmental regulations to reduce algal bloom in the Adriatic Sea, against the interests of farmers and industrialists but in favour of the coastal tourist sector.

During his visits to Rome, Zangheri frequently met with a circle of friends from Romagna, including journalist Sergio Zavoli, painter Alberto Sughi, and sometimes filmmaker Federico Fellini and poet Tonino Guerra.

== Personal life and death ==
In 1992, Zangheri married Claudia dall'Osso, who was half Zangheri's age. Zangheri had one daughter.

On 19 December 2003, Zangheri was awarded the Sigismondo d’Oro, the highest civic award offered by Rimini's municipal government.

In his later life, Zangheri lived in Imola, which he associated with Costa, who was born in the city. He developed Alzheimer's disease.

Zangheri died in Imola on 6 August 2015. Though his funeral was a private service, the city of Bologna declared a day of mourning on 8 August 2015, and the funeral chapel was opened for visits in the Sala Rossa of the city's Palazzo d’Accursio.
