= Salvatore Caronna =

Italian politician

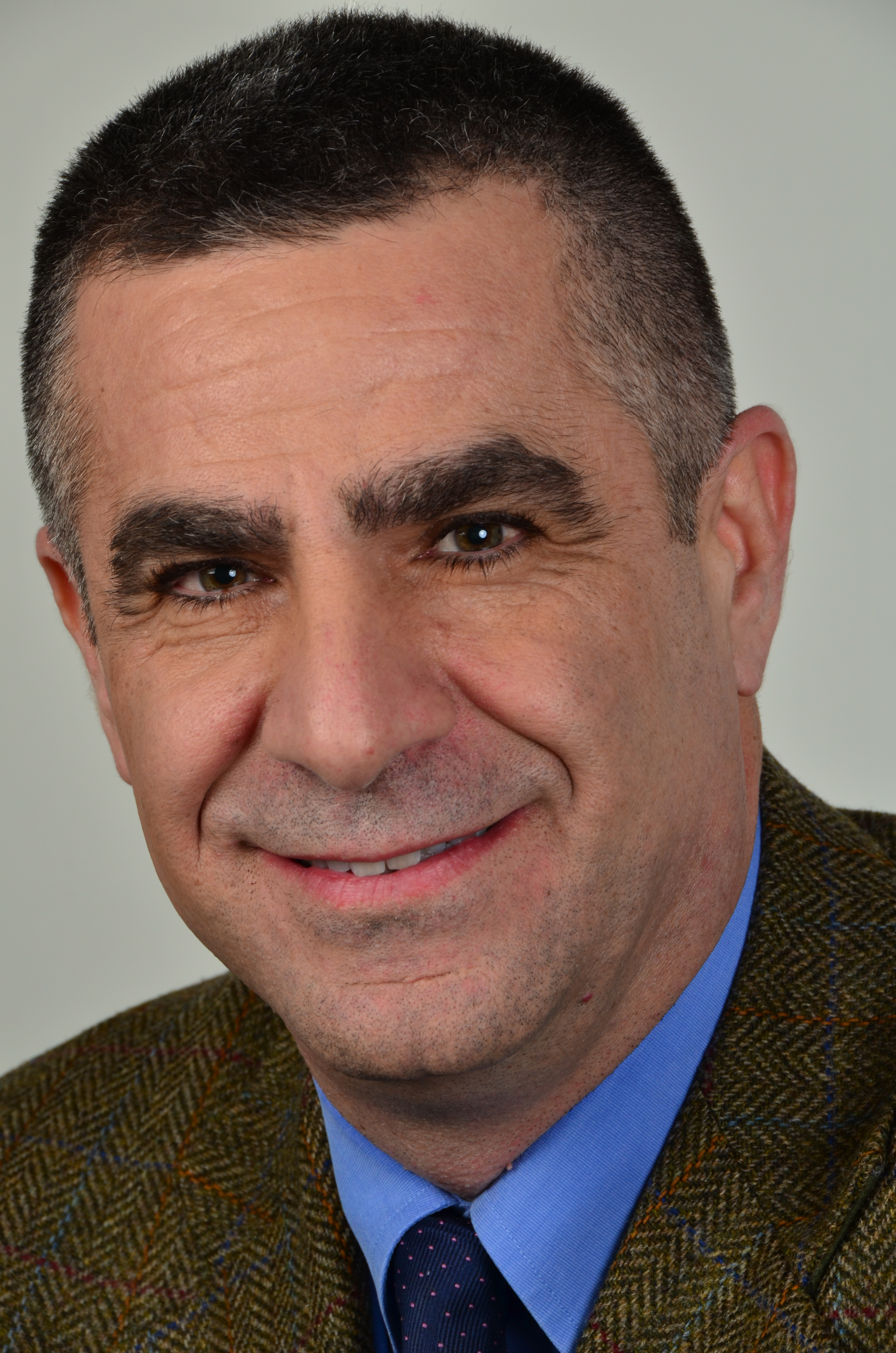
Caronna in February 2014

Salvatore Caronna (born 5 March 1964, in Bad Säckingen) is an Italian politician and Member of the European Parliament (MEP).

== Biography ==
Caronna's interest in politics began when he was young and joined the student movement. After that experience, he had the opportunity to join student organizations at the national level. In 1986, he assumed the post of secretary of the Communist Youth Federation of Bologna (where he had studied).

He was president of the Arci Bolognese from 1989 to 1993 and national manager of the association. In December 1999, on the day of the defeat of the center-left in Bologna, he was elected secretary of the Democrats of the Left, a position that he held until the end of June 2006. After that time, the center-left returned to govern Bologna.

He was first elected to the Consiglio Communale in Bologna, and served as regional adviser of Emilia-Romagna from 2005 to 2009. In the primary elections of October 14, 2007, Caronna was elected regional secretary of the Democratic Party of Emilia-Romagna, where he was part of the national directorate of the Democratic Party.

In the election of June 6 and 7, 2009, Caronna was elected deputy to the European Parliament. His is a member in the EU regional development commission and an alternate for the agriculture and civil liberties, justice, and internal affairs commissions. He was a member of a special commission against corruption, money laundering, and the mafia.

Caronna renewed his candidacy in the 2014 European Parliament election but did not obtain a new post.

Caronna is married and has two children.
