= President of Emilia-Romagna =

- Flag of Emilia-Romagna.

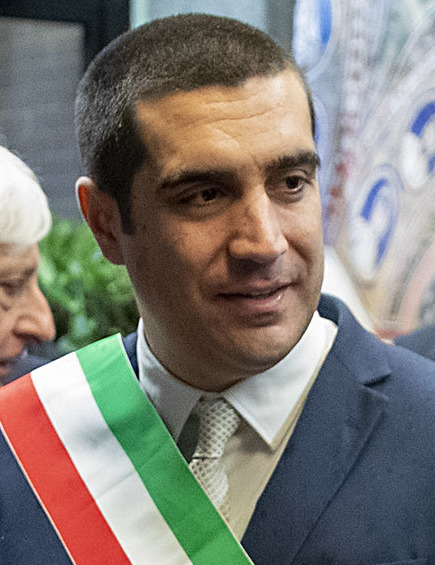
- Incumbent; Michele De Pascale since 13 December 2024
- Residence: Via A. Moro 52, Bologna
- Term length: Five years, two consecutive terms
- Inaugural holder: Guido Fanti (1970)
- Formation: Constitution of Italy
- Website: regione.emilia-romagna.it

The president of Emilia-Romagna is the supreme authority of Emilia-Romagna, one of the twenty regions of Italy The current president is Michele De Pascale, who was elected in the 2024 Emilia-Romagna regional election and has served since 13 December 2024.

== Election ==
Originally appointed by the Regional Council of Emilia-Romagna, since 1995 de facto and 2000 de jure, he is elected by popular vote every five years under universal suffrage: the candidate who receives a plurality of votes, is elected.

His office is connected to the Regional Council, which is elected contextually: one fifth of the assembly seats are generally reserved to his supporters, which are wholesale elected concurrently with the president. The Council and the president are linked by an alleged relationship of confidence: if the president resigns or he is dismissed by the Council, a snap election is called for both the legislative and the executive offices, because in no case the two bodies can be chosen separately.

The popular election of the president and the relationship of confidence between him and the legislature, allow to identify the Italian regions model of government as a particular form of semi-presidential system.

== Powers ==
The president of Emilia-Romagna promulgates regional laws and regulations. He can receive special administrative functions by the national government. The president is one of the eighty members of the Regional Council and, in this capacity, he can propose new laws.

The president appoints and dismiss the Regional Cabinet (called Giunta Regionale in Italian). The Cabinet is composed by no more than ten regional assessors (assessori, literally "aldermen"), who can be members of the Council at the same time. Assessors should not be confused with the ministers: according to Italian administrative law, assessors only receive delegations from the president to rule a bureau or an agency, the Region being a single legal person, not divided in ministries. One assessor can be appointed Vice President. The president can also appoint four under-secretaries (sottosegretari) to help the president in his functions.

The Regional Cabinet prepares the budget, appoints the boards of public regional agencies and companies, manages assets, develops projects of governance, and resorts to the Constitutional Court of Italy if it thinks that a national law may violate regional powers. The president and the Cabinet are two different authorities of the Region: in matters within its competence, the Cabinet has the power to vote to give its approval.

== Regional Cabinet ==
The Regional Cabinet is currently composed by the president and ten regional assessors.

== See also ==
- List of presidents of Emilia-Romagna
