= Sergio Cofferati =

Italian politician (born 1948)

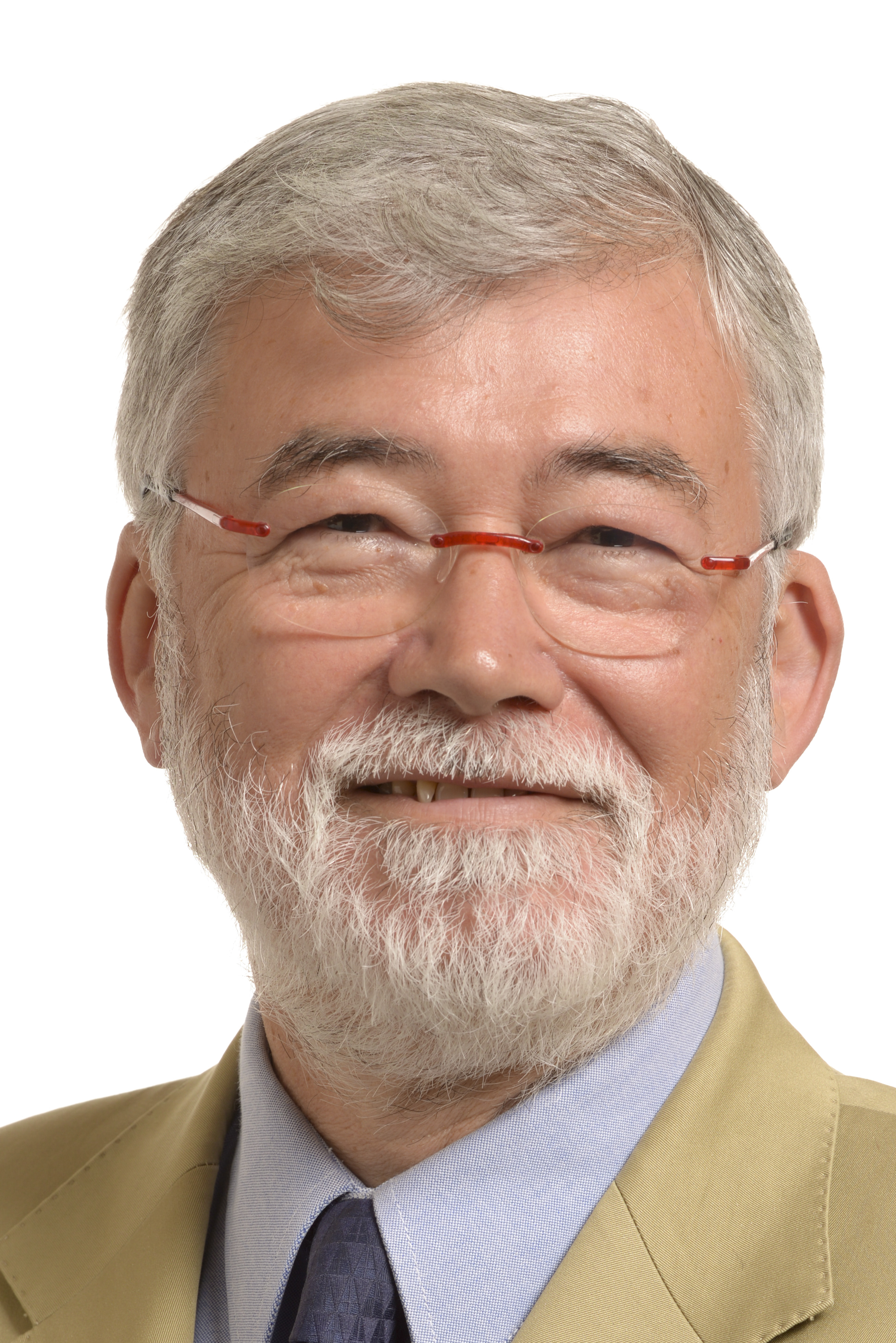

Member of the European Parliament
- In office 14 July 2009 – 2 July 2019
- Constituency: North-West Italy

Mayor of Bologna
- In office 14 June 2004 – 25 June 2009
- Preceded by: Giorgio Guazzaloca
- Succeeded by: Flavio Delbono

General Secretary of CGIL
- In office 29 June 1994 – 20 September 2002
- Preceded by: Bruno Trentin
- Succeeded by: Guglielmo Epifani

Personal details
- Born: 30 January 1948 (age 78) Sesto ed Uniti, Italy
- Party: DS (before 2007); PD (2007–2015; since 2023); SI (2017–2023)

Sergio Gaetano Cofferati (born 30 January 1948) is an Italian trade unionist and politician. He was secretary general of CGIL from 1994 to 2002, mayor of Bologna for the Democrats of the Left from 2004 to 2009, and Member of the European Parliament (MEP) from 2009 to 2019 elected as a candidate of the Democratic Party.

== Early life and career ==
Cofferati was born at Sesto ed Uniti, in the province of Cremona. Initially an employee of Milan's Pirelli and a member of CGIL, Cofferati rose up in the major Italian trade union, becoming leader of Filcea (the chemical labour wing of CGIL) in 1988, and Secretary General of the CGIL itself in 1990, succeeding Bruno Trentin. He led the CGIL until 2002, after having obtained some relevant triumphs such as negotiating the reform of pensions in 1995, and opposing the change of article 18 of the "workers' statute", a 1970 bill, which protects employees in the event of illegitimate, unjust and discriminatory dismissal.

In 2004, Cofferati was elected as mayor of Bologna, replacing Giorgio Guazzaloca. In 2008, he decided not to run for his second term as mayor.

== Member of the European Parliament, 2009–2019 ==
In 2009 Cofferati was elected to the European Parliament as a Member of the Progressive Alliance of Socialists and Democrats. He first served on the Committee on Employment and Social Affairs (2009–2012) before moving to Committee on the Internal Market and Consumer Protection in 2012. In 2016, he also joined the Parliament's temporary Committee of Inquiry into Money Laundering, Tax Avoidance and Tax Evasion (PANA) that investigated the Panama Papers revelations and tax avoidance schemes more broadly.

In addition to his committee assignments, Cofferati was one of the vice-chairs of the European Parliament Intergroup on Seas, Rivers, Islands and Coastal Areas. He is also a member of the European Parliament Intergroup on Western Sahara; the European Parliament Intergroup on Extreme Poverty and Human Rights; and the MEP Heart Group, a group of parliamentarians who have an interest in promoting measures that will help reduce the burden of cardiovascular diseases (CVD).

Trade union offices
Preceded by Giuliano Cazzola	General Secretary of the Italian Federation of Chemical and Allied Workers; 1988–1990	Succeeded by Franco Chiriaco
Civic offices
Preceded by Giorgio Guazzaloca	Mayor of Bologna; 2004-2009	Succeeded by Flavio Delbono
