= Virginio Merola =

Italian politician

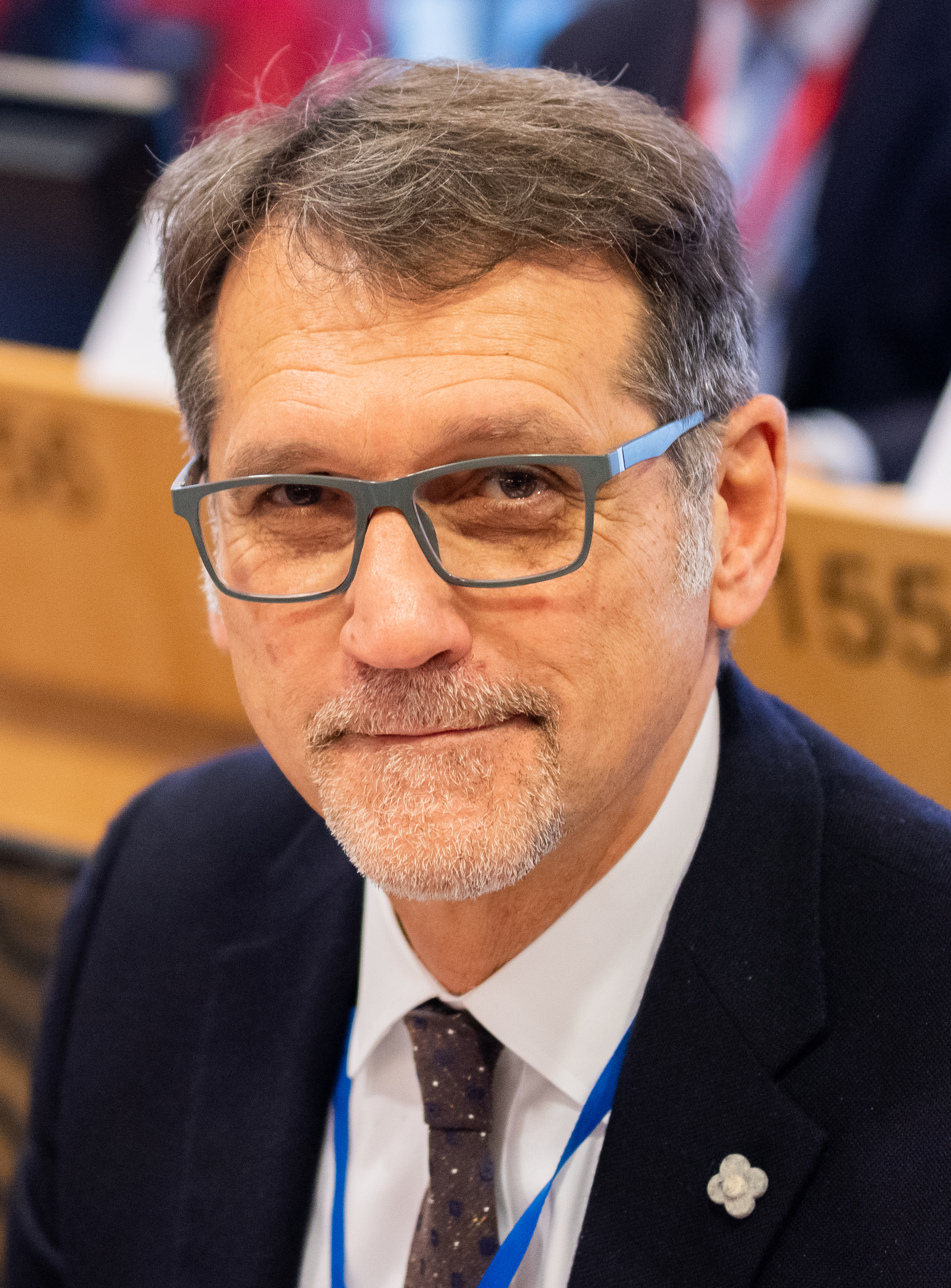

Mayor of Bologna
- In office 16 May 2011 – 11 October 2021
- Preceded by: Flavio Delbono
- Succeeded by: Matteo Lepore

1st Metropolitan Mayor of Bologna
- In office 1 January 2015 – 11 October 2021
- Preceded by: Office established
- Succeeded by: Matteo Lepore

Member of the Chamber of Deputies
- Incumbent
- Assumed office 13 October 2022
- Constituency: Bologna

Personal details
- Born: 14 February 1955 (age 71) Santa Maria Capua Vetere, Campania, Italy
- Party: PD (2007–present)
- Other political affiliations: PCI (1970s–1991); PDS (1991–1998); DS (1998–2007)
- Education: University of Bologna
- Occupation: Politician
- Website: www.virginiomerola.it

Virginio Merola (born 14 February 1955) is an Italian politician. Merola is a member of the Democratic Party and former Mayor of Bologna.

== Early life ==
Virginio Merola was born on 14 February 1955 in Santa Maria Capua Vetere in the Province of Caserta in Campania. After a short period in Curti, his family migrated to Bologna, when he was five years old. He attended the classical lyceum Marco Minghetti and then he studied at the University of Bologna, where he graduated in philosophy.

== Political career ==
During the 1970s Merola became a member of the Italian Communist Party, of which Bologna was a solid stronghold. When the PCI was transformed into a social democratic party, the Democratic Party of the Left, Merola joined it. He had been President of Savena district for the PDS from 1995 to 2004, when he was appointed city planning by mayor Sergio Cofferati, a former trade union leader.

In 2007 Virginio Merola was one of the founders of the Democratic Party. In 2008 he was candidated to the centre-left primary to become Mayor in 2009 municipal election. The contest was won by University professor and Vice President of Emilia Romagna Flavio Delbono and Merola arrived third with 21.4% of votes.

In 2010 Delbono resigned as mayor after the so-called Cinziagate, when the Mayor was being investigated for embezzlement, fraud and aggravated abuse of office following allegations made by his former lover. Delbono's natural heir as mayor was considered Maurizio Cevenini, a famous local politician who has been a long-time member of the city council; but Cevenini suffered an ischemia in October 2010 and renounced to run as new mayor. After Cevenini's withdrawal Merola ran again in the primary election against Amelia Frascaroli, a member of Left Ecology Freedom, and Benedetto Zacchiroli, an LGBT activist member of the PD, and won with 58.4% of votes.

In 2011 election he led a centre-left coalition against Manes Bernardini, member of the right-wing regionalist Lega Nord, who led the centre-right coalition. Merola won the election in the first round with 50.47% of votes; he is the latest of a long line of left-wing mayors of Bologna.

In September 2014 Merola transcribed, along with other centre-left mayor like Ignazio Marino and Giuliano Pisapia, in the civil register the foreign marriages of same-sex couples, which was opposed by Catholic institutions.

After the establishment of metropolitan cities, administrative divisions that included a large core city and the smaller surrounding towns that are closely related to it with regard to economic activities and essential public services, on 1 January 2015 Merola became also Metropolitan Mayor of Bologna.

In 2016 he ran once again as leader of a centre-left coalition against Lucia Borgonzoni, member of Lega Nord, and Massimo Bugani, the candidate of the Five Star Movement. Merola became the most voted candidate in the first round, but gained only 39.5% of votes and did not succeed in being elected in the first round. On 19 June, he won the second round with 54.64% of votes and remained mayor.

== Electoral history ==
Election	House	Constituency	Party	Votes	Result
2022	Chamber of Deputies	Emilia-Romagna – Bologna	PD	93,462	Elected

== See also ==
- List of mayors of Bologna
- List of Democratic Party of Italy politicians
