= Emilia-Romagna (Chamber of Deputies constituency) =

- Chamber of Deputies; Electoral constituency
- Region: Emilia-Romagna
- Electorate: 3,316,885 (2018)
- Major settlements: Bologna, Cesena, Ferrara, Forlì, Modena, Parma, Piacenza, Reggio Emilia

Current constituency
- Created: 1993
- Seats: 43 (1993–2013); 45 (2013–2022); 29 (2022–present)
- Members: PD (10); FdI (8); Lega (3); M5S (2); FI (2); A–IV (2); AVS (2)

Emilia-Romagna is one of the 29 constituencies (Italian: circoscrizioni) represented in the Chamber of Deputies, the lower house of the Italian parliament. The constituency currently elects 29 deputies, more than any other in the parliament. Its boundaries correspond to those of the Italian region of Emilia-Romagna. The electoral system uses a parallel voting system, which act as a mixed system, with 37% of seats allocated using a first-past-the-post electoral system and 61% using a proportional method, with one round of voting.

The constituency was first established by the Mattarella law on 4 August 1993 and later confirmed by the Calderoli law on 21 December 2005 and by the Rosato law on 3 November 2017.

== Members of the Parliament ==
=== Legislature XIX (2022–present) ===
Single-member districts
District			Electoral list	Deputy	Parliamentary group	Ref.
N.	Name	Map	Electoral list	Deputy	Parliamentary group	Ref.
01	Piacenza		Centre-right coalition	Tommaso Foti	Brothers of Italy	
02	Parma		Centre-right coalition	Laura Cavandoli	League	
03	Reggio-Emilia		Centre-left coalition	Ilenia Malavasi	Democratic Party	
04	Modena		Centre-right coalition	Daniela Dondi	Brothers of Italy	
05	Imola		Centre-left coalition	Angelo Bonelli	Greens and Left Alliance	
06	Bologna		Centre-left coalition	Virginio Merola	Democratic Party	
07	Carpi		Centre-left coalition	Andrea De Maria	Democratic Party	
08	Ravenna		Centre-right coalition	Alice Buonguerrieri	Brothers of Italy	
09	Ferrara		Centre-right coalition	Mauro Malaguti	Brothers of Italy	
10	Forlì		Centre-right coalition	Gloria Saccani Jotti	Forza Italia	
11	Rimini		Centre-right coalition	Jacopo Morrone	League	

=== Legislature XVIII (2018–2022) ===
Single-member districts
District			Electoral list	Deputy	Parliamentary group		Ref.
N.	Name	Map	Electoral list	Deputy	At election	Current	Ref.
01	Imola		Centre-left coalition	Serse Soverini	Together	Democratic Party	
02	Cesena		Centre-right coalition	Simona Vietina	Forza Italia	Coraggio Italia	
03	Ravenna		Centre-left coalition	Alberto Pagani	Democratic Party		
04	Ferrara		Centre-right coalition	Maura Tomasi	League		
05	San Giovanni in Persiceto		Centre-left coalition	Francesco Critelli	Democratic Party		
06	Bologna–Mazzini		Centre-left coalition	Andrea De Maria	Democratic Party		
07	Bologna–Casalecchio di Reno		Centre-left coalition	Gianluca Benamati	Democratic Party		
08	Cento		Centre-right coalition	Emanuele Cestari	League		
09	Modena		Centre-left coalition	Beatrice Lorenzin	Popular Civic	Democratic Party	
10	Sassuolo		Centre-right coalition	Benedetta Fiorini	Forza Italia		
11	Scandiano		Centre-left coalition	Antonella Incerti	Democratic Party		
12	Parma		Centre-right coalition	Laura Cavandoli	League		
13	Fidenza		Centre-right coalition	Giovanni Battista Tombolato	League		
14	Piacenza		Centre-right coalition	Tommaso Foti	Brothers of Italy		
15	Rimini		Centre-right coalition	Elena Raffaelli	League		
16	Forlì		Centre-left coalition	Marco Di Maio	Democratic Party	Italia Viva	
17	Reggio Emilia		Centre-left coalition	Graziano Delrio	Democratic Party		

Multi-member districts
District			Party	Deputy
N.	Name	Map	Party	Deputy
01	Emilia-Romagna – 01		Five Star Movement	Giulia Sarti
01	Emilia-Romagna – 01		Five Star Movement	Carlo Ugo De Girolamo
01	Emilia-Romagna – 01		Democratic Party	Dario Franceschini
01	Emilia-Romagna – 01		Democratic Party	Giuditta Pini
01	Emilia-Romagna – 01		League	Jacopo Morrone
01	Emilia-Romagna – 01		Forza Italia	Galeazzo Bignami
02	Emilia-Romagna – 02		Five Star Movement	Vittorio Ferraresi
02	Emilia-Romagna – 02		Five Star Movement	Stefania Ascari
02	Emilia-Romagna – 02		Democratic Party	Piero Fassino
02	Emilia-Romagna – 02		Democratic Party	Andrea Rossi
02	Emilia-Romagna – 02		League	Carlo Piastra
02	Emilia-Romagna – 02		League	Guglielmo Golinelli
02	Emilia-Romagna – 02		Forza Italia	Vittorio Sgarbi
03	Emilia-Romagna – 03		Democratic Party	Carla Cantone
03	Emilia-Romagna – 03		Democratic Party	Luca Rizzo Nervo
03	Emilia-Romagna – 03		Five Star Movement	Matteo Dall'Osso
03	Emilia-Romagna – 03		Five Star Movement	Alessandra Carbonaro
03	Emilia-Romagna – 03		League	Gianni Tonelli
03	Emilia-Romagna – 03		Free and Equal	Pier Luigi Bersani
04	Emilia-Romagna – 04		Democratic Party	Andrea Orlando
04	Emilia-Romagna – 04		Democratic Party	Paola De Micheli
04	Emilia-Romagna – 04		Democratic Party	Luigi Marattin
04	Emilia-Romagna – 04		Five Star Movement	Maria Edera Spadoni
04	Emilia-Romagna – 04		Five Star Movement	Davide Zanichelli
04	Emilia-Romagna – 04		League	Gianluca Vinci
04	Emilia-Romagna – 04		League	Elena Murelli
04	Emilia-Romagna – 04		Forza Italia	Michaela Biancofiore
04	Emilia-Romagna – 04		Brothers of Italy	Ylenja Lucaselli
