= List of interferences in U.S. elections =

- Chinese interference in the 2024 United States elections
- Iranian interference in the 2024 United States elections
- Russian interference in the 2020 United States elections
- Russian interference in the 2016 United States elections
