= Foreign interference in the 2024 United States elections =

Several nations interfered in the 2024 United States elections. U.S. intelligence agencies identified China, Iran, and Russia as the most pressing concerns, with Russia being the most active threat.

Interference included propaganda, disinformation, and misinformation campaigns using inauthentic accounts and websites on social media and the internet; successful and unsuccessful attempts to hack presidential campaigns; the promotion and denigration of specific candidates and causes; and the posting of divisive content and conspiracy theories to cause domestic unrest and criticize the United States and democracy more broadly.

== Background ==
Before the election, current and former U.S. officials stated that foreign interference in the 2024 election was likely. Three major factors cited were "America's deepening domestic political crises, the collapse of controversial attempts to control political speech on social media, and the rise of generative AI."

In March 2021, the National Intelligence Council released a report that found Russia and Iran carried out operations to influence the 2020 election. It also stated that China "considered but did not deploy" influence efforts in 2020, although it increased efforts by the 2022 midterms. A declassified U.S. intelligence report released in December 2023 found with "high confidence" that a "diverse and growing group of foreign actors" including China, Russia, Iran, and Cuba had all interfered in the 2022 midterms with influence campaigns on social media to covertly advance the interests their respective nations, exacerbate social divisions, and sow doubt in democracy, voting, and the result of elections.

In 2022, the Foreign Malign Influence Center was set up at the Intelligence Community Campus-Bethesda as a command hub to fight electoral disinformation surrounding the 2024 presidential election.

== Analysis ==
In a statement on September 12, 2024, Matthew G. Olsen head of the Justice Department's National Security Division warned that foreign interference is a "clear and present danger" in the lead up to the 2024 U.S. Presidential Election. Among the nations he listed as posing a significant threat of interfering with the contest are Iran, Russia, China, and North Korea. There are also indications Cuba is attempting to influence U.S. elections by targeting Spanish language social media users. U.S. intelligence officials have described the efforts as part of broader efforts by authoritarian nations to use the internet to erode support for democracy.

The Associated Press cites U.S. intelligence officials as describing Chinese interference as being more aggressive in recent months but overall cautious and nuanced, instead focusing on American policy towards Taiwan and undermining "confidence in elections, voting and the U.S. in general." Iran was also described as more aggressive than in the past, while Russia was described as remaining the top threat. Iranian interference is described as attempting to tip the election against Trump, which is believed to be partly in response to Trump's withdrawal from the 2015 nuclear deal and the 2020 assassination of Qasem Soleimani. However, Iran has also targeted the Biden and Harris campaigns, which The New York Times described as suggesting "a wider goal of sowing internal discord and discrediting the democratic system in the United States more broadly in the eyes of the world." U.S. intelligence has described Russian interference as supporting Trump, viewing him as more skeptical towards arming Ukraine. China, Russia, and Iran have all promoted disinformation criticizing the Democratic nominee for president. Officials from the ODNI and FBI have stated that Russia, Iran, and China are using generative artificial intelligence tools to create fake and divisive text, photos, video, and audio content to foster anti-Americanism and engage in covert influence campaigns. China's efforts are primarily focused on down-ballot races. The use of artificial intelligence was described as an accelerant rather than a revolutionary change to influence efforts.

The scale of electoral disinformation has been described by experts as a "firehose of disinformation" and exceeding anything in prior elections. Several social media platforms have scaled back efforts to remove disinformation on their platforms following criticism from American conservatives who allege political bias. The New York Times has described Elon Musk's X as "perhaps the single biggest factor in today's disinformation landscape" after gutting most of the website's content moderation team and safety features. Musk has repeatedly shared and posted "demonstrably false anti-Harris disinformation to his 200 million followers" according to a USA Today investigation, has repeatedly posted false claims about the results of the 2020 election, and played "an outsize role in amplifying content promoted by Tenet Media" according to a researchers. CISA has reportedly changed its strategy towards educating the American public about electoral disinformation instead of asking social media companies to take down false information.

In advance of the 2024 election, American intelligence assessments found that Iran had covertly supported college protests against the war in Gaza using social media posing as students and having operatives offer financial assistance. Pro-Israel groups have also spent large sums of money to support pro-Israel candidates against candidates critical of the Israeli government. Jordanian-American journalist Rami George Khouri wrote that "Such aggressive funding campaigns by AIPAC and other pro-Israeli forces may soon be perceived as another dimension of foreign interference in US elections, which has grown as a national concern since 2016."

=== State-sponsored interference ===
==== China ====
The Chinese Communist Party (CCP) and government of China interfered in the 2024 United States elections through propaganda and disinformation campaigns, primarily linked to its Spamouflage influence operation. Cyberespionage and wire-tapping operations were launched against US politicians by Salt Typhoon, an advanced persistent threat group linked to the Ministry of State Security. The efforts came amidst other foreign interference in the 2024 United States elections.

==== Iran ====
The Iranian government interfered in the 2024 United States elections through social media efforts and hacking operations. Iranian interference came amidst larger foreign interference in the 2024 United States elections. The efforts were identified as an effort to tip the race against former president Donald Trump through propaganda and disinformation campaigns. However, Iranian efforts have also targeted Joe Biden and Kamala Harris with similar attacks, which The New York Times stated suggested "a wider goal of sowing internal discord and discrediting the democratic system in the United States more broadly in the eyes of the world."

==== Russia ====
The Russian state and government interfered in the 2024 United States elections through disinformation and propaganda campaigns aimed at damaging Joe Biden, Kamala Harris, and other Democrats while boosting the candidacy of Donald Trump and other candidates who support isolationism and undercutting support for Ukraine aid and NATO. Russia's efforts represented the most active threat of foreign interference in the 2024 United States elections and follows Russia's previous pattern of spreading disinformation through fake social-media accounts and right-wing YouTube channels in order to divide American society and foster anti-Americanism. On September 4, 2024, the US Department of Justice indicted members of Tenet Media for having received $9.7 million as part of a covert Russian influence operation to co-opt American right-wing influencers to espouse pro-Russian content and conspiracy theories. Many of the followers of the related influencers were encouraged to steal ballots, intimidate voters, and remove or destroy ballot drop-offs in the weeks leading up to the election.

==== Suspected state-sponsored interference ====
On August 28, 2024, a CNN investigation in collaboration with the Centre for Information Resilience found an orchestrated effort to influence voters through an orchestrated campaign "with hallmarks that could be consistent with a state-sponsored actor" highlighting 56 fake, pro-Trump accounts on X using stolen and altered images of "attractive young women" to espouse pro-Trump propaganda, conspiracy theories, and "anti-LGBTQ, anti-transgender, anti-vaccination, racist and xenophobic sentiments."

== See also ==
- Divide and conquer – Strategy in politics and sociology
- Foreign electoral intervention – Interventions by foreign governments in elections
- List of Donald Trump 2024 presidential campaign international endorsements
- List of foreign electoral interventions
- List of Kamala Harris 2024 presidential campaign international endorsements
- Lobbying in the United States
- Propaganda – Communication used to influence opinion
- Artificial intelligence in the 2024 United States presidential election
