= List of Kamala Harris 2024 presidential campaign international endorsements =

This is a list of notable international officials or organizations that endorsed the Kamala Harris 2024 presidential campaign.

== Heads of state and government ==
=== Current ===
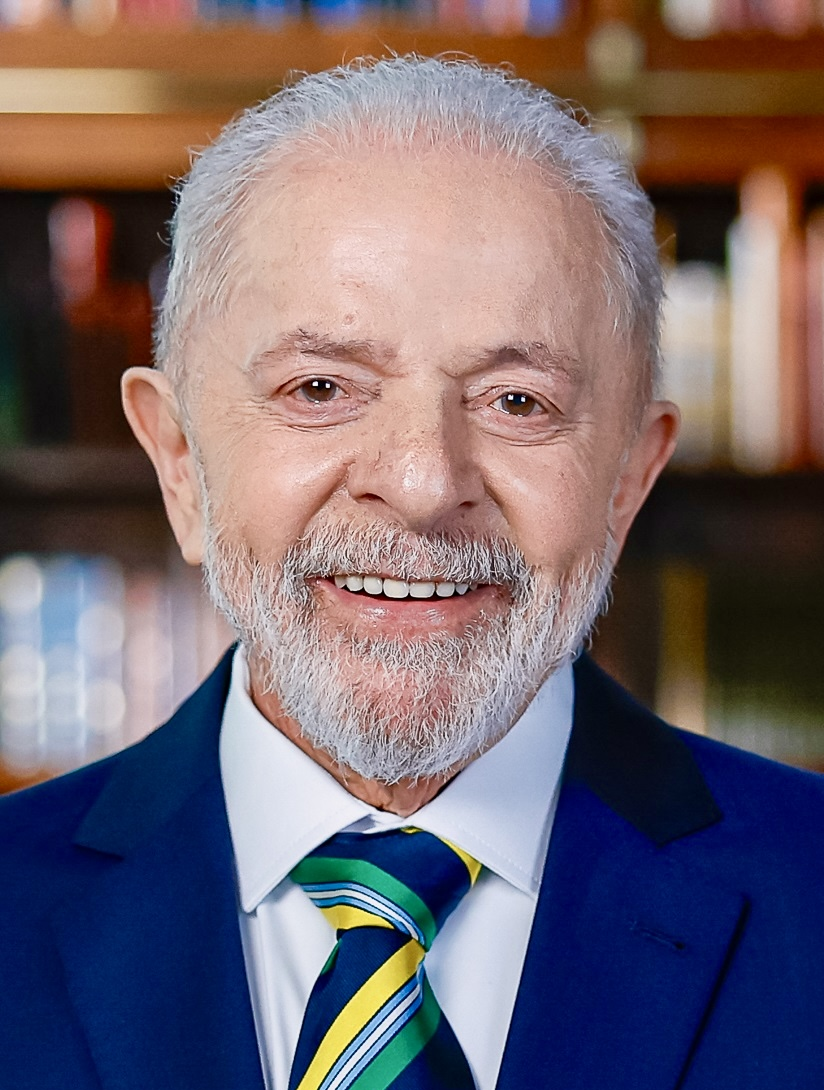
Lula da Silva

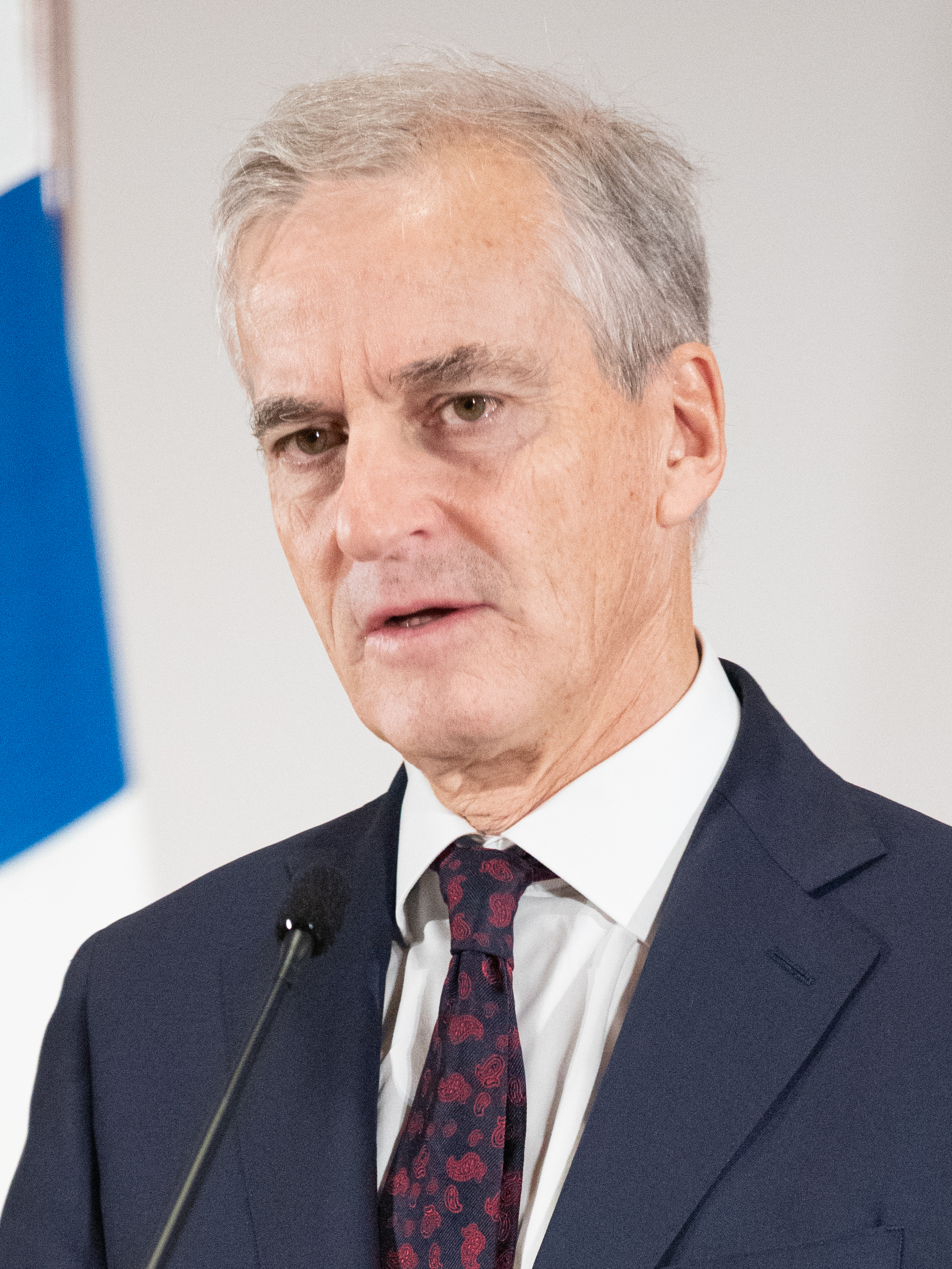
Jonas Gahr Støre

- Lula da Silva, President of Brazil (2003–2010, 2023–present) (Workers' Party)
- Jonas Gahr Støre, 36th prime minister of Norway (2021–present) Leader of the opposition in Norway (2014–2021), leader of the Labour Party (AP) (2021–present), Minister of Foreign Affairs (2005–2012), Minister of Health and Care Services (2005–2012), and Member of the Storting for Oslo (Labour Party)

=== Former ===
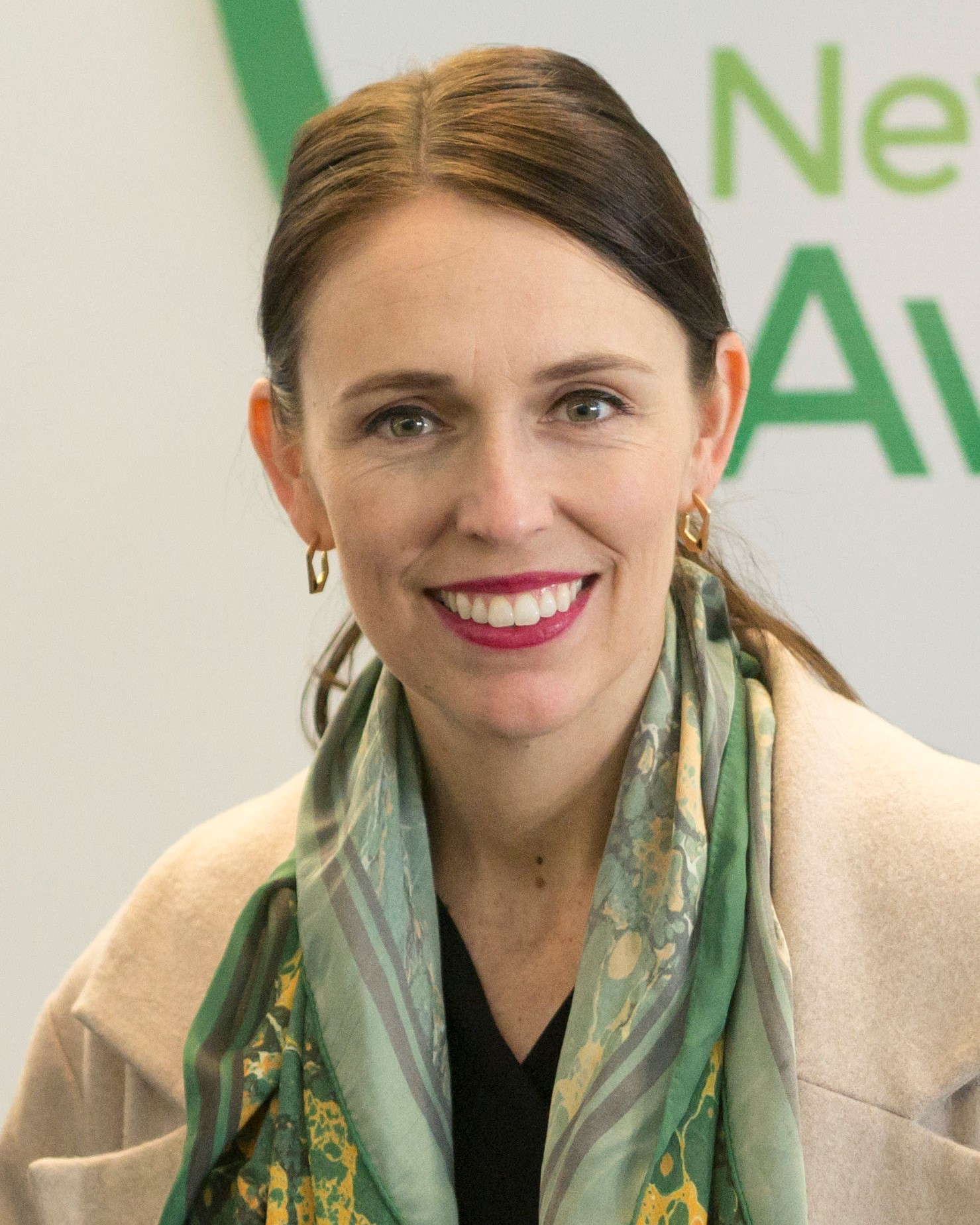
Jacinda Ardern

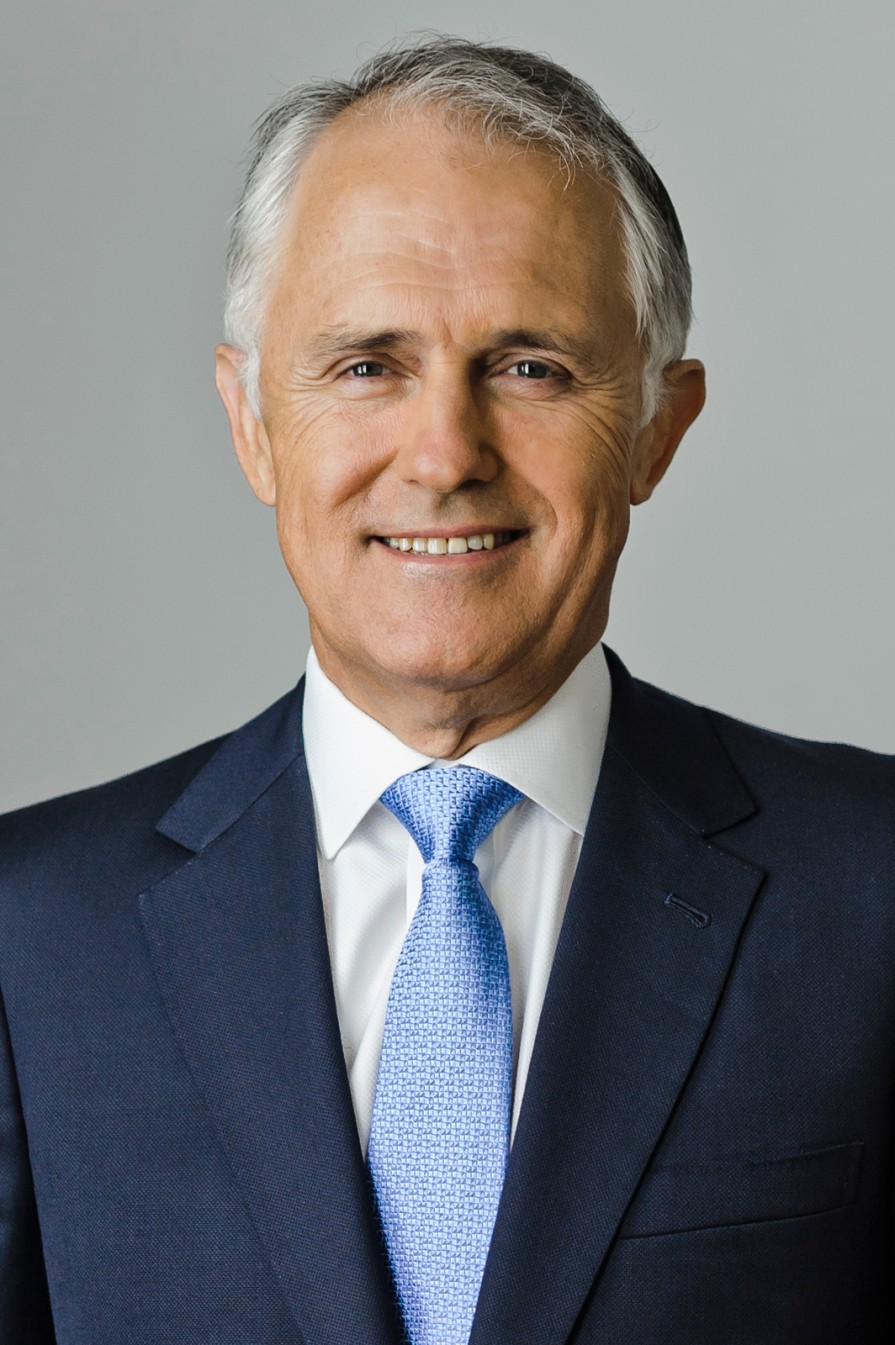
Malcolm Turnbull

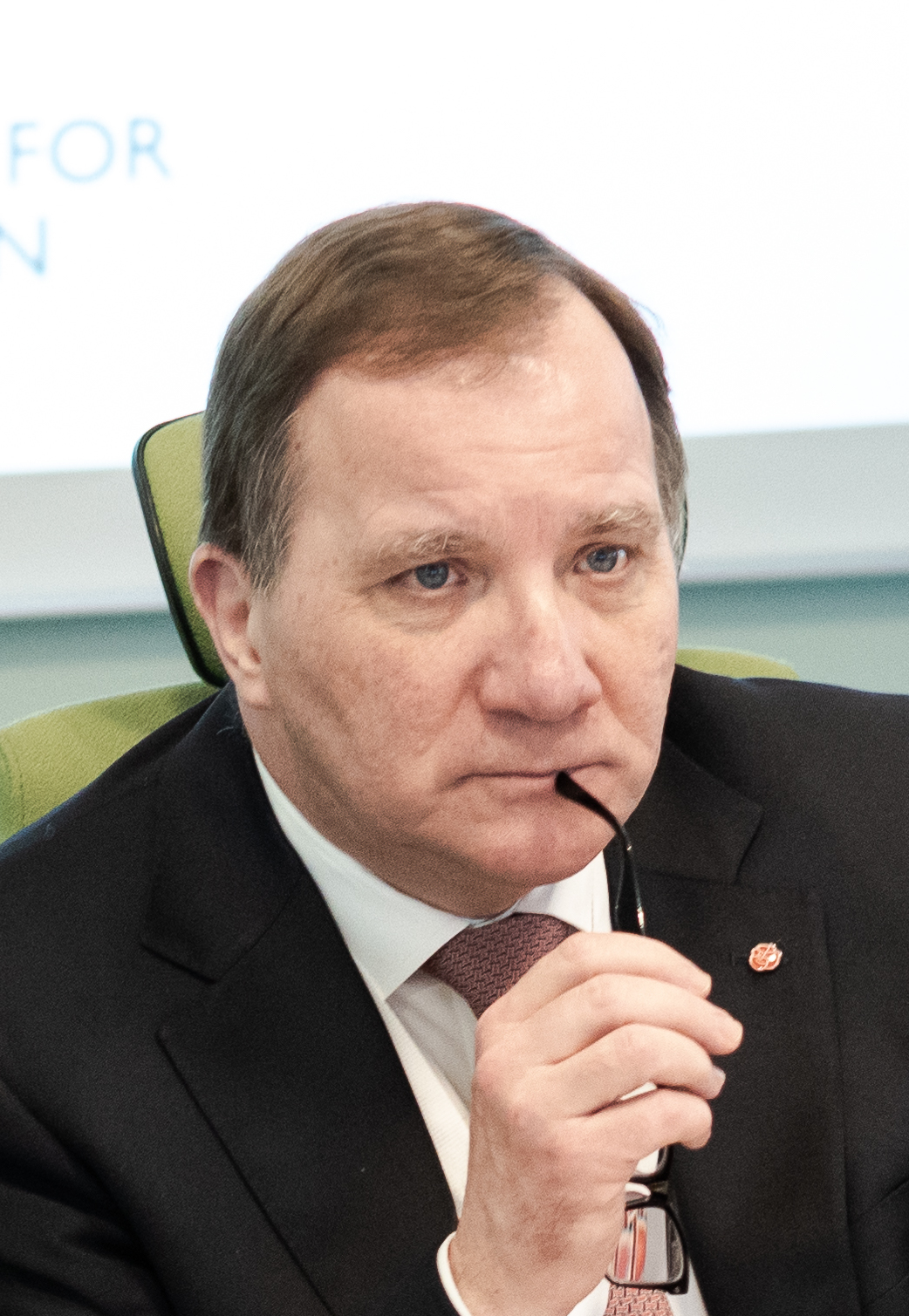
Stefan Löfven

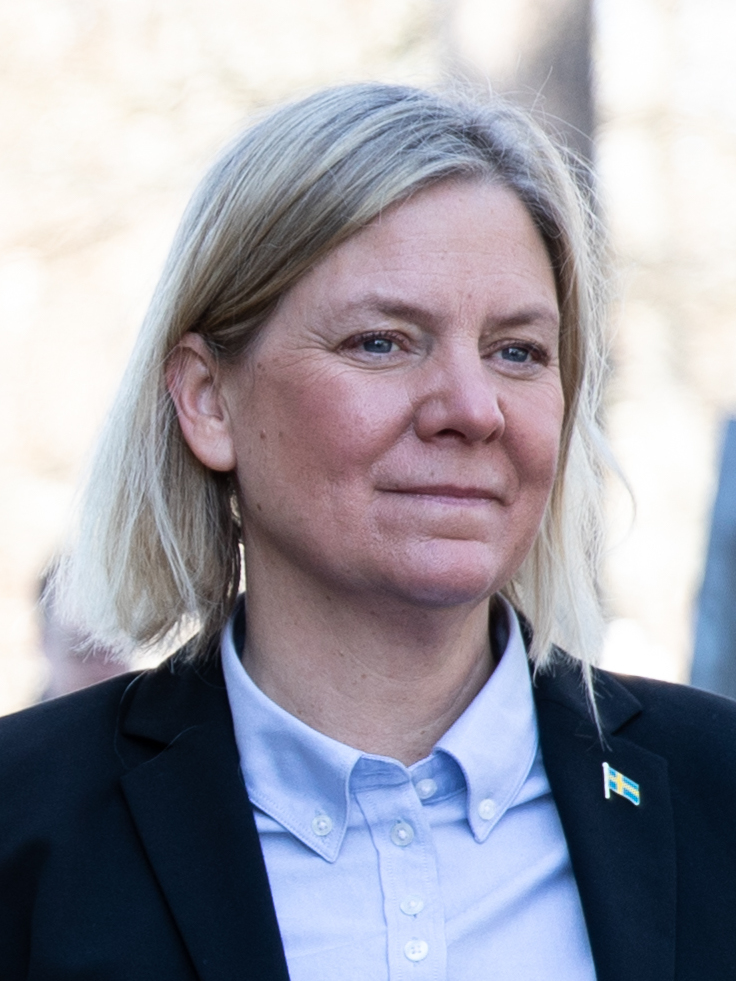
Magdalena Andersson

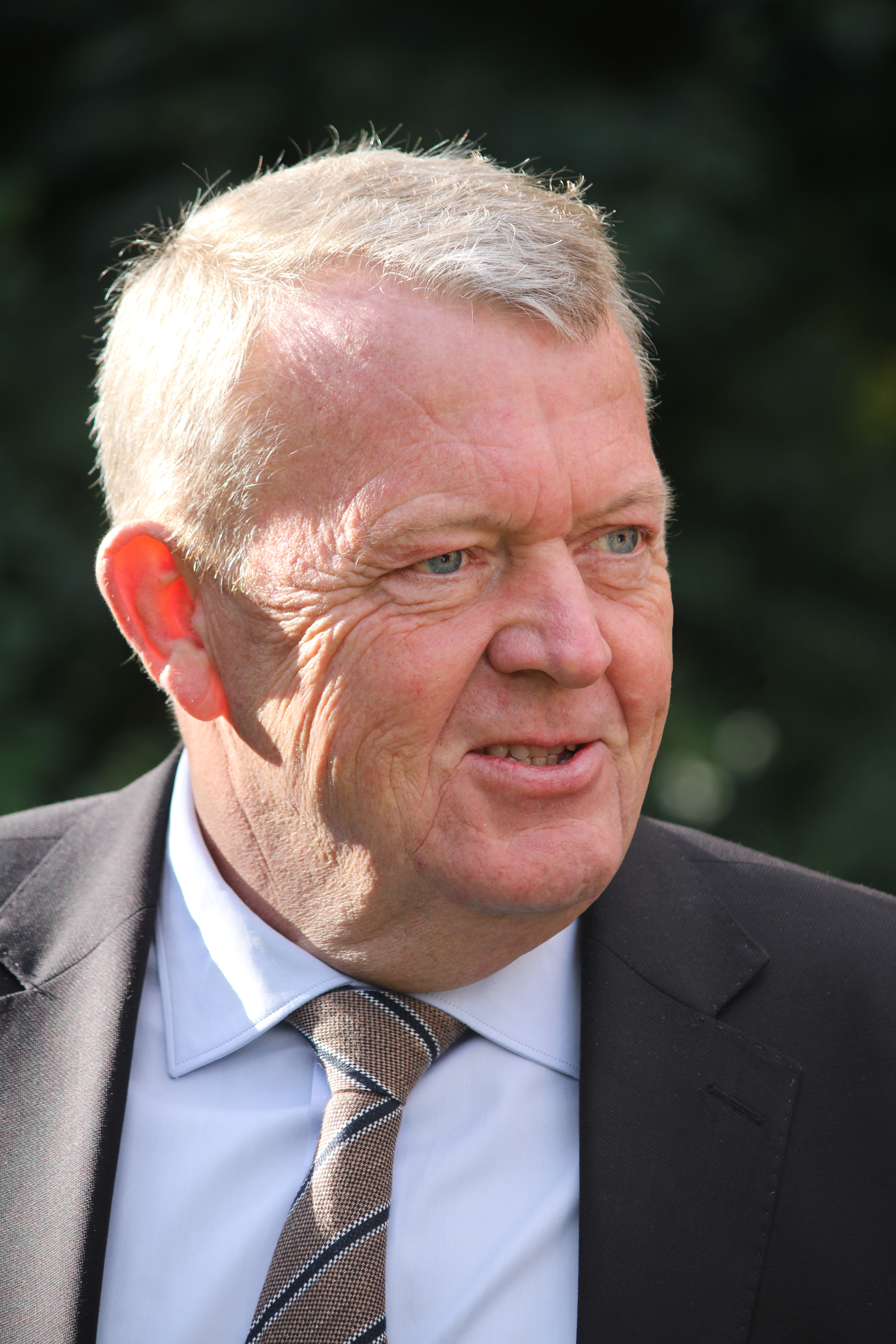
Lars Løkke Rasmussen

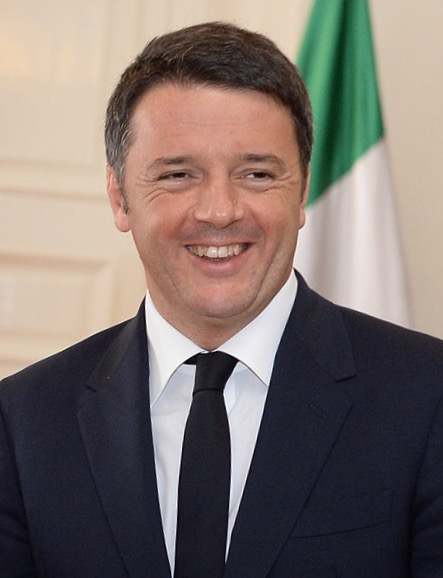
Matteo Renzi

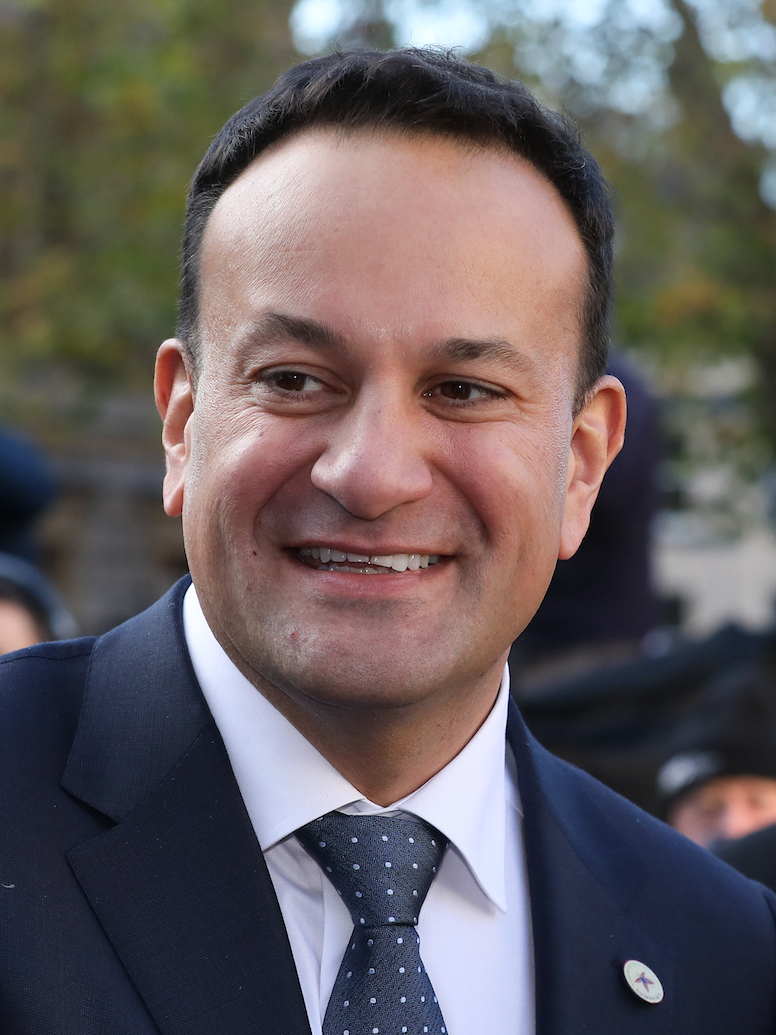
Leo Varadkar

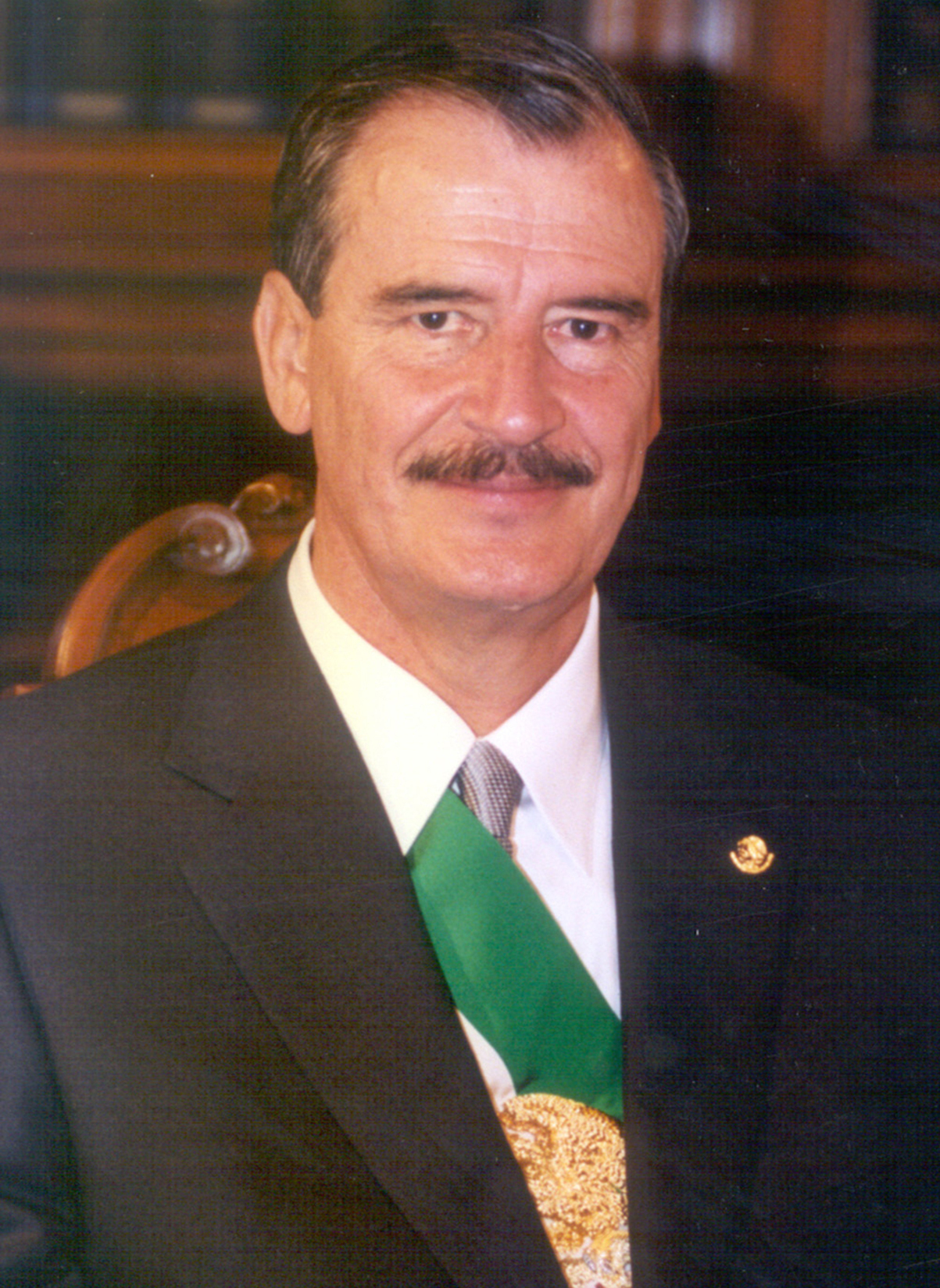
Vicente Fox

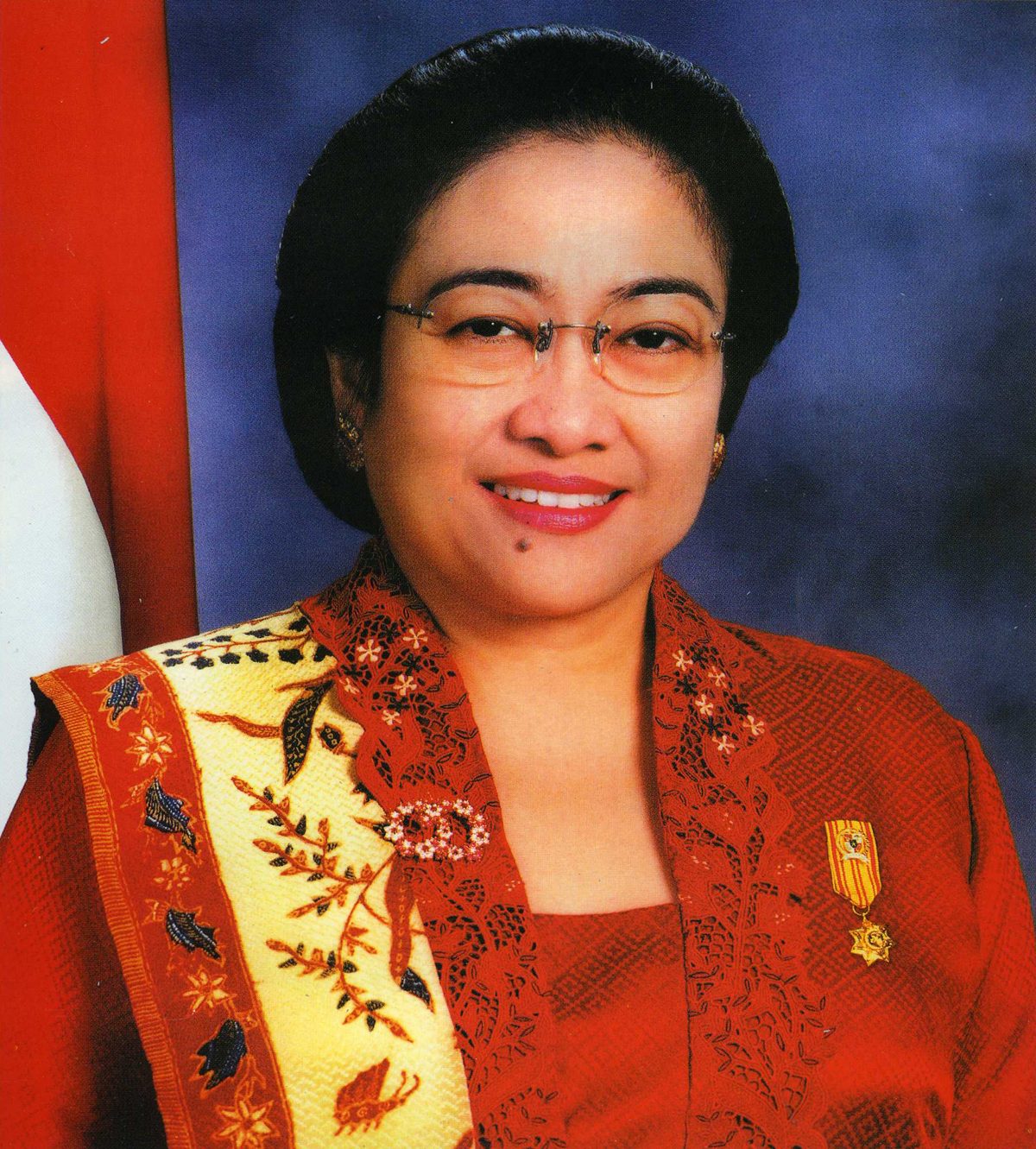
Megawati Soekarnoputri

- Magdalena Andersson, leader of the opposition in Sweden (2022–present), leader of the Swedish Social Democratic Party (S) (2021–present), 34th prime minister of Sweden (2021–2022) (S)
- Jacinda Ardern, 40th prime minister of New Zealand (2017–2023), 17th Leader of the Labour Party (2017–2023), 36th Leader of the Opposition (2017), 17th Deputy Leader of the Labour Party (2017), member of Parliament for Labour party list (2008–2017) and Mount Albert (2017–2023) (Labour)
- Óscar Arias, 40th & 45th president of Costa Rica (1986–1990, 2006–2010) (National Liberation Party)
- Cellou Dalein Diallo, 6th prime minister of Guinea (2004–2006) (UFDG)
- Vicente Fox, 62nd president of Mexico (2000–2006), Governor of Guanajuato (1995–1999), and Member of the Chamber of Deputies for Guanajuato's 3rd district (Independent; served as president under PAN)
- Stefan Löfven, President of the Party of European Socialists (2022–present), 33rd prime minister of Sweden (2014–2021), leader of the Swedish Social Democratic Party (2014–2021) (S)
- Yemi Osinbajo, acting president of Nigeria (2016, 2017), Vice President of Nigeria (2015–2023) (All Progressives Congress)
- Lars Løkke Rasmussen, Prime Minister of Denmark (2009–2011, 2015–2019), Minister of Foreign Affairs (2022–present) (Moderates)
- Matteo Renzi, Prime Minister of Italy (2014–2016), member of the Senate of the Republic for Campania (2022–present) and Florence (2018–2022) (Italia Viva)
- Megawati Sukarnoputri, 1st chairperson of the Indonesian Democratic Party of Struggle (PDI-P) (1999–present), 5th president of Indonesia (2001–2004), 8th vice president of Indonesia (1999–2001), member of the People's Representative Council for Central Java (1987–1997) and West Java (1999) (PDI-P)
- Malcolm Turnbull, Prime Minister of Australia (2015–2018) (Liberal)
- Leo Varadkar, Taoiseach (2017–2020, 2022–2024), Teachta Dála for Dublin West (2007–2024) (Fine Gael)

== Individuals ==
=== Argentina ===
- Esteban Paulón, National Deputy from the Santa Fe Province (2023–present) (Socialist Party)

=== Australia ===
- George Brandis, Australian High Commissioner to the United Kingdom (2018–2022), Attorney-General of Australia (2013–2017), Senator for Queensland (2000–2018) (Liberal)

=== Austria ===
- Werner Kogler, Vice-Chancellor (2020–2024) and Minister of the Arts, Culture, the Civil Service and Sport (2020–2025) and spokesman of The Greens (2017–present) (Grüne)
- Thomas Waitz, Co-chair of the European Green Party (2022–2024) and member of the European Parliament from The Greens (2017–2019, 2020–present) (Grüne)

=== Canada ===
- Jessica Bell, member of the Legislative Assembly of Ontario for University—Rosedale (2018–present) (Ontario New Democratic Party)
- Yves-François Blanchet, leader of the Bloc Québécois (2019–present), MP for Beloeil—Chambly (Bloc Québécois)
- Christy Clark, Premier of British Columbia (2011–2017) (BC United)
- Elizabeth May, leader of the Green Party of Canada (2006–2019, 2022–present), MP for Saanich—Gulf Islands (Green Party of Canada)
- Rachel Notley, Premier of Alberta (2015–2019), member of the Legislative Assembly of Alberta from Edmonton-Strathcona (2008–2024) (Alberta New Democratic Party)
- Jagmeet Singh, leader of the New Democratic Party (NDP) (2017–2025), MP for Burnaby South (2019–2025), member of the Ontario Provincial Parliament for Bramalea—Gore—Malton (2011–2017) (NDP)
- Kathleen Wynne, Premier of Ontario (2013–2018) (Ontario Liberal Party)

=== Czechia ===
- Jan Bartošek, 1st Vice-Chairman of KDU-ČSL (2022–2024), Deputy President of the Chamber of Deputies (2021–present), Deputy (2013–present) (KDU-ČSL)
- Jan Berki, Vice-Chair of Mayors for the Liberec Region (SLK) (2018–present), Deputy (2021–present) (SLK)
- Jan Farský, Leader of Mayors for the Liberec Region (SLK) (2008–2009), 1st Vice-Chair of Mayors and Independents (STAN) (2019–present), Vice-Chair of SLK (2009–2017), Member of the European Parliament for Czech Republic (2024–present), Deputy (2010–2022), Mayor of Semily (2006–2014) (STAN)
- Josef Flek, Deputy (2021–present) (Mayors and Independents)
- Markéta Gregorová, Member of the European Parliament for Czech Republic (2019–present), Chairwoman of the European Pirate Party (2018–2019) (Piráti)
- Šimon Heller, Deputy (2021–present) (KDU-ČSL)
- Jan Jakob, Vice-Chair of TOP 09 (2019–2023), Deputy (2021–present) (TOP 09)
- Ondřej Kolář, Member of the European Parliament for Czech Republic (2024–present), Deputy (2021–2024), Mayor of Prague 6 (2014–2022) (TOP 09)
- Michael Kohajda, Deputy (2021–present) (KDU-ČSL)
- Jan Lacina, Vice-Chair of Mayors and Independents (STAN) (2022–present), Deputy (2021–present) (STAN)
- Danuše Nerudová, Member of the European Parliament for Czech Republic (2024–present) (STAN)
- Luděk Niedermayer, Member of the European Parliament for Czech Republic (2014–present) (TOP 09)
- Vít Rakušan, First Deputy Prime Minister of the Czech Republic (2021–present), Minister of the Interior (2021–present), Leader of STAN (2019–present), 1st Vice-Chairman of STAN (2016–2019), Deputy (2017–present) (STAN)
- Michael Rataj, Deputy (2021–present) (Mayors and Independents)
- Olga Richterová, Vice-chairwoman of the Czech Pirate Party (Piráti) (2018–2022), Deputy President of the Chamber of Deputies (2021–present), Deputy (2017–present) (Piráti)

=== Denmark ===
- Troels Lund Poulsen, Deputy Prime Minister (2023–present), member of the Folketing from East Jutland (2007–present) and Vejle (2001–2007) (Venstre)
- Nicolai Wammen, Minister of Finance (2019–present), member of the Folketing from East Jutland (2011–present) and Århus (2001–2005) (Social Democrats)
- Pia Olsen Dyhr, member of the Folketing for Copenhagen (2005–present) Socialist People's Party

=== France ===
- Jean-Luc Mélenchon, member of the National Assembly from the Bouches-du-Rhône's 4th constituency (2017–2022) (La France Insoumise, co-endorsed Jill Stein)
- Mélanie Vogel, Co-chair of the European Green Party (2022–present) and senators of French citizens living abroad (LE)

=== Finland ===
- Mika Aaltola, Member of the European Parliament for Finland (2024–present) (National Coalition Party)
- Li Andersson, Member of the European Parliament for Finland (2024–present), Minister of Education (2019–2020, 2021–2023), Leader of the Left Alliance (2016–2024), and Member of the Finnish Parliament for Varsinais-Suomi (2015–2024) (Left Alliance)
- Maria Guzenina, Member of the European Parliament for Finland (2024–present), Minister of Social Services (2011–2013), and Member of Parliament for Uusimaa (2007–2024) (Social Democratic Party of Finland)
- Eero Heinäluoma, Member of the European Parliament for Finland (2019–present), Speaker of the Parliament of Finland (2011–2015), Deputy Prime Minister of Finland (2005–2007), and Leader of the Social Democratic Party of Finland (Social Democratic Party)
- Anna-Maja Henriksson, Member of the European Parliament for Finland (2024–present), Minister of Education (2023–2024), Minister of Justice (2011–2015, 2019–2023), Leader of the Swedish People's Party of Finland and Member of the Finnish Parliament (2007–2024) (Swedish People's Party)
- Elsi Katainen, Member of the European Parliament for Finland (2018–present) and Member of the Finnish Parliament for Northern Savonia (2007–2015) and Savo-Karelia (Centre Party)
- Katri Kulmuni, Member of the European Parliament for Finland (2024–present), Deputy Prime Minister of Finland (2019–2020), Minister of Finance (2019–2020), Minister of Economic Affairs, Leader of the Centre Party (2019–2020), and Member of the Finnish Parliament for Lapland (2015–2024) (Centre)
- Merja Kyllönen, Member of the European Parliament for Finland (2014–2019, 2024–present), Minister of Transport and Communications (2011–2014), and Member of the Finnish Parliament for Oulu (2007–2014) (Left Alliance)
- Ville Niinistö, Member of the European Parliament for Finland (2024–present), Minister of the Environment and Climate Change (2011–2014), Chair of the Green League (2011–2017), and Member of the Finnish Parliament for Varsinais-Suomi (2007–2019) (Green League)
- Maria Ohisalo, Member of the European Parliament for Finland (2024–present), Minister of the Environment and Climate Change (2022–2023), Minister of the Interior (2019–2024), and Chairman of the Green League (2019–2023) (Green League)
- Aura Salla, Member of the European Parliament for Finland (2024–present) and Member of the Finnish Parliament for Helsinki (2023–2024) (National Coalition Party)
- Pekka Toveri, Member of the European Parliament for Finland (2024–present) and Member of the Finnish Parliament for Uusimaa (2007–2019) (National Coalition Party)

=== Germany ===
- Daniel Freund, Member of the European Parliament for Germany (2019–present) (Alliance 90/The Greens)
- Sigmar Gabriel, Vice-Chancellor of Germany (2013–2018) (SPD)
- Metin Hakverdi, member of the Bundestag (2013–present) (SPD)
- Lars Klingbeil, co-leader of the Social Democratic Party of Germany (2021–present), member of the Bundestag (2005, 2009–present) (SPD)
- Reinhard Krumm, director of the US and Canada office of the Friedrich Ebert Foundation (SPD)
- David McAllister, Chair of the European Parliament Committee on Foreign Affairs Committee (2017–present), Member of the European Parliament for Germany (2014–present), Vice President of the European People's Party (2015–present), Minister-President of Lower Saxony (2010–2013), Chairman of the Christian Democratic Union of Lower Saxony (2008–2016), Leader of the Christian Democratic Union in the Landtag of Lower Saxony (2003–2010), and Member of the Landtag of Lower Saxony for Hadeln/Wesermünde (1998–2014) (CDU)
- Serpil Midyatli, Leader of the Opposition in Schleswig-Holstein (2023–present) and deputy leader of the Social Democratic Party of Germany (2019–present) (SPD)
- Nils Schmid, member of the Bundestag from Nürtingen (2017–present) (SPD)
- Ralf Stegner, Leader of the Opposition in Schleswig-Holstein (2017–2023) and deputy leader of the Social Democratic Party of Germany (2014–2019) (SPD)

=== Hungary ===
- Katalin Cseh, Member of the European Parliament for Hungary (2019–2024) (Momentum Movement)

=== Ireland ===
- Seán Kelly, Member of the European Parliament for South (2009–present) and Leader of Fine Gael in the European Parliament (Fine Gael)

=== Italy ===
- Christian Diego Di Sanzo, member of the Chamber of Deputies from the North and Central America constituency (PD)
- Nicola Fratoianni, Secretary of Italian Left (2017–2019, 2021–present) member of the Chamber of Deputies for Tuscany (2022–present), Piedmont (2018–2022), and Apulia (2013–2018) (Italian Left)
- Sandro Gozi, Member of the European Parliament for Italy (2020–present), Minister for European Affairs (2014–2018), Member of the Chamber of Deputies for Piedmont (2006–2018) (Italia Viva)
- Elly Schlein, Secretary of the Democratic Party (2023–present), member of the Chamber of Deputies from the Emilia-Romagna (2022–present) (PD)

=== Liberia ===
- Tiawan Saye Gongloe, 2023 candidate for President of Liberia (LPP)

=== Luxembourg ===
- Jean Asselborn, Ministry of Foreign Affairs (2004–2023), Deputy Prime Minister of Luxembourg (2004–2013) (LSAP)

=== Netherlands ===
- Kati Piri, member of the Dutch House of Representatives (2021–present) and member of the European Parliament (2014–2021) from the Labour Party (PvdA)
- Tineke Strik, Member of the European Parliament for Netherlands (2019–present) and Member of the Senate (2007–2019) (GroenLinks)
- Frans Timmermans, leader of the Labour Party (2023–present), member of the House of Representatives (2023–2024), first vice-president of the European Commission (2019–2023), minister of Foreign Affairs (2012–2014) (PvdA)

=== New Zealand ===
- Peeni Henare, member of the New Zealand Parliament for Tāmaki Makaurau (2014–present) (Labour)

=== Nigeria ===
- Peter Obi, Governor of Anambra State (2006, 2007–2014) (Labour Party)

=== Portugal ===
- Sebastião Bugalho, member of the European Parliament for Portugal from the Democratic Alliance (2024–present) (AD)
- Ana Gomes, candidate for the 2021 Portuguese presidential election, member of the European Parliament for Portugal from the Socialist Party (2004–2019) (PS)
- Bruno Gonçalves, member of the European Parliament for Portugal from the Socialist Party (2024–present) (PS)
- Miguel Costa Matos, member of the Portuguese Parliament from the Socialist Party (2019–present), secretary general of the Socialist Youth (2020–2024) (PS)
- Pedro Nuno Santos, Secretary-General of the Socialist Party (2024–2025), Leader of the Opposition (2024–2025), Minister of Infrastructure and Housing (2019–2023) (PS)

=== Singapore ===
- Kishore Mahbubani, Permanent Representative to the United Nations (1984–1989, 1998–2004)

=== Slovakia ===
- Michal Šimečka, Chairman of Progressive Slovakia (2022–present), Vice-President of the European Parliament (2022–2023), Deputy Speaker of the National Council (2023–2024), Member of the European Parliament for Slovakia (2019–2023), member of the National Council (2023–present) (Progressive Slovakia)

=== South Africa ===
- Steve Letsike, member of the National Assembly (2024–present) (ANC)

=== Spain ===
- Félix Bolaños, Minister of the Presidency, Justice and Relations with the Cortes (2023–present), Member of the Congress of Deputies for Madrid (2023–present) (PSOE)
- Jaume Collboni, Mayor of Barcelona (2023–present) (PSC)
- Ana Redondo García, Minister for Equality (2023–present) (PSOE)
- Patxi López, Leader of the Socialist Parliamentary Group in the Congress of Deputies (2022–present), Member of the Congress of Deputies for Biscay (2016–present, 1987–1989) (PSOE)
- Andoni Ortuzar, President of the Basque Nationalist Party (2013–present)

=== United Kingdom ===
- Jeffrey Archer, Member of the House of Lords Lord Temporal (1992–2024), MP for Louth (1969–1974) (Independent)
- Jonathan Ashworth, MP for Leicester South (2011–2024) (Labour Co-op)
- Robert Buckland, MP for South Swindon (2010–2024), Secretary of State for Justice (2019–2021), Secretary of State for Wales (2022) (Conservative)
- Ruth Cadbury, MP for Brentford and Isleworth (2015–present) (Labour)
- Alex Cole-Hamilton, Leader of the Scottish Liberal Democrats (2021–present), MSP for Edinburgh Western (2016–present) (Scottish Liberal Democrats)
- Ed Davey, Leader of the Liberal Democrats (2020–present), MP for Kingston and Surbiton (1997–2015, 2017–present), Deputy Leader of the Liberal Democrats (2019–2020), Secretary of State for Energy and Climate Change (2012–2015) (Liberal Democrats)
- Matthew Doyle, Downing Street Director of Communications (2024–present) (Labour)
- David Evans, General Secretary of the Labour Party (2020–2024) (Labour)
- Michael Gove, Secretary of State for Housing, Communities and Local Government (2021–2022; 2022–2024), Minister for Intergovernmental Relations (2021–2022; 2022–2024), Chancellor of the Duchy of Lancaster (2019–2021), Minister for the Cabinet Office (2020–2021), Secretary of State for Environment, Food and Rural Affairs (2017–2019), Lord Chancellor (2015–2016), Parliamentary Secretary to the Treasury (2014–2015), Secretary of State for Education (2010–2014), MP for Surrey Heath (2005–2024) and editor of The Spectator (Conservative)
- Sadiq Khan, Mayor of London (2016–present) and MP for Tooting (2005–2016) (Labour)
- Henry McLeish, First Minister of Scotland (2000–2001), Leader of the Scottish Labour Party (2000–2001), Minister for Enterprise and Lifelong Learning (1999–2000), Minister of State for Scotland (1997–1999), Member of the Scottish Parliament for Central Fife (1999–2003), and Member of Parliament for Central Fife (1987–2001) (Scottish Labour)
- Morgan McSweeney, Chief of Staff to the prime minister of the United Kingdom (Labour)
- Andrew Mitchell, MP for Sutton Coldfield (2001–present), Shadow Foreign Secretary (2024) (Conservative)
- Lucy Rigby, MP for Northampton North (2024–present) (Labour)
- John Swinney, First Minister of Scotland (2024–present), Leader of the Scottish National Party (2000–2004, 2024–present) (SNP)
- Mike Tapp, MP for Dover and Deal (2024–present) (Labour)
- Luke Taylor, MP for Sutton and Cheam (2024–present) (Liberal Democrats)

== Organizations ==
=== Political internationals ===
- Liberal International
- Progressive Alliance
- Socialist International

=== Political parties ===
Supranational

- European Democratic Party
- European Green Party
- The Left
- Party of European Socialists
- Progressive Alliance of Socialists and Democrats
- Renew Europe

National

- Alliance 90/The Greens
- Democratic Party (Italy)
- Ecologist Green Party
- The Ecologists
- Estonian Greens
- Green Europe
- Green League
- Green Left (Denmark)
- Green Left (Netherlands)
- Green Party (Ireland)
- Green Party (Norway)
- Green Party of Switzerland
- The Greens (Poland)
- LIVRE
- Party of Greens of Ukraine
- Social Democratic Youth of Denmark
- Spanish Socialist Workers' Party

Regional

- Basque Nationalist Party
- Ecolo
- Green Left (Catalonia)
- Groen

=== Political party foundations ===
- Friedrich Ebert Foundation
- Heinrich Böll Foundation

== See also ==
- List of Donald Trump 2024 presidential campaign international endorsements
- List of Kamala Harris 2024 presidential campaign political endorsements
- Foreign interference in the 2024 United States elections
