= Lega Romagna =

- Secretary: Jacopo Morrone
- Founded: 1991
- Ideology: Regionalism; Federalism; Populism
- National affiliation: Lega Nord (1991–2020); Lega per Salvini Premier (2020–present)
- Legislative Assembly of Emilia-Romagna: 2 / 50
- Chamber of Deputies (Romagna seats): 2 / 10
- Senate (Emilia-Romagna seats): 0 / 22

Website
- https://www.legaromagna.it

Proposed flag of Romagna by Lega Nord Romagna

Lega Romagna (English: League Romagna), whose complete name is Lega Romagna per Salvini Premier (English: League Romagna for Salvini Premier), is a regionalist political party active in Romagna, part of Emilia-Romagna region. The party was a "national" section of Lega Nord (LN) from 1991 to 2020, and has been the regional section of Lega per Salvini Premier (LSP) in Romagna since 2020.

The party's current leader is Jacopo Morrone in February 2020. Gianluca Pini, long-time party leader (1991–2015) and member of the Chamber of Deputies (2006–2018), is a nostalgic of the LN and a strong critic of the LSP.

The party has been a long proponent of the separation of Romagna from Emilia and, thus, the establishment of the Region of Romagna. For now it has campaigned with some success for the "return" of Romagnol municipalities of northern Marche to Romagna.

== Recent history ==
In May 2012 Gianluca Pini, who was a staunch supporter of the new federal secretary Roberto Maroni, was re-elected national secretary with the support of 91% of party delegates during a national congress.

In the 2014 regional election the joint list of LNE and LNR obtained its best result so far in a regionwide election (19.4%).

In October 2015 Jacopo Morrone was elected secretary to succeed to Pini, who was later installed as president.

In the 2019 European Parliament election the party obtained 33.8%, its best result ever. In the 2020 Emilia-Romagna regional election LNE's Lucia Borgonzoni posed the strongest challenge so far to the dominant PD, but stopped at 43.6% and was defeated, while the League's list obtained 32.0%.

Following the formation of Lega per Salvini Premier and the 2019 federal congress of the LN, after which the latter became practically inactive, in February 2020 the LNR was re-established as Lega Romagna per Salvini Premier in order to become the regional section of the new party. The founding members of the new LR were Morrone, Elena Raffaelli and Lorenzo Martino. Subsequently, Andrea Liverani replaced Morrone as leader of the party, in charge as commissioner. A few months later Morrone returned to the helm, while Pini was launching legal challenges to reinstate the old party.

In June 2023, during a party congress, Morrone was unanimously elected secretary.

== Popular support ==
Lega Nord was usually stronger in the outer provinces, both in Emilia and Romagna. In the 2019–2020 elections (European Parliament and Regional Council, respectively) it did better in the provinces of Piacenza (45.3% and 44.0%), Parma (38.8% and 36.5%), Ferrara (41.9% and 41.9%) and Rimini (36.5% and 34.5%).

The combined electoral results of Lega Nord Emilia and Lega Nord Romagna in Emilia-Romagna are shown in the tables below.

1990 regional	1992 general	1994 general	1995 regional	1996 general	1999 European	2000 regional	2001 general	2004 European	2005 regional	2006 general	2008 general	2009 European	2010 regional
2.9	9.6	6.4	3.4	7.2	3.0	2.6	3.3	3.4	4.8	3.9	7.8	11.1	13.7

2013 general	2014 European	2014 regional	2018 general	2019 European	2020 regional	2022 general	2024 European
2.6	5.0	19.4	19.2	33.8	32.0	7.5	6.5

== Leadership ==
- Secretary: Corrado Metri (1991–1996), Stefano Fantinelli (1996–1999), Gianluca Pini (1999–2015), Jacopo Morrone (2015–2020), Andrea Liverani (commissioner 2020–present), Jacopo Morrone (2020–present, commissioner 2020–2023)
- President: unknown (1991–1996), Corrado Metri (1996–1999), Stefano Fantinelli (1999–2007), Mauro Monti (2007–2014), Beatrice Lamio (2014–2015), Marcello Naldini (2015), Gianluca Pini (2015–2020)
