= Iranian interference in the 2024 United States elections =

The Iranian government interfered in the 2024 United States elections through social media efforts and hacking operations. Iranian interference came amidst larger foreign interference in the 2024 United States elections. The efforts were identified as an effort to tip the race against former president Donald Trump through propaganda and disinformation campaigns. However, Iranian efforts have also targeted Joe Biden and Kamala Harris with similar attacks, which The New York Times stated suggested "a wider goal of sowing internal discord and discrediting the democratic system in the United States more broadly in the eyes of the world."

In June 2024, the presidential campaign of Donald Trump, the former president of the United States, and the re-election campaign of Joe Biden, the president of the United States, were targets of a hacking operation. According to Microsoft, a high-ranking official to a U.S. presidential campaign fell victim to a spear phishing attack perpetrated by the Islamic Revolutionary Guard Corps.

The Federal Bureau of Investigation is currently investigating the hack. U.S. intelligence agencies stated they were confident that the hacks were perpetrated by Iran on August 19.

== Background ==
In March 2021, the National Intelligence Council released a report that found Russia and Iran carried out operations to influence the 2020 election. A declassified U.S. intelligence report released in December 2023 found with "high confidence" that a "diverse and growing group of foreign actors" including China, Russia, Iran, and Cuba had all interfered in the 2022 midterms with influence campaigns.

By July 2024, American intelligence assessments concluded that Iran had covertly supported pro-Palestinian protests on university campuses using social media by posing as students with operatives providing financial assistance to some protest groups in an attempt to stoke division ahead of the 2024 election.

== Incidents ==
In May and June 2024, Iran attempted to hack the Donald Trump 2024 and Joe Biden 2024 presidential campaigns, according to Google's Threat Analysis Group. The group APT42, believed to be linked to the Islamic Revolutionary Guard Corps (IRGC), targeted approximately twelve people associated with the Trump and Biden campaigns. It succeeded in hacking the Trump campaign but not the Biden campaign.

Microsoft alerted Trump advisor Roger Stone that his Hotmail account had been compromised and told him that it suspected Iran had done it. (Microsoft would publicly report this on August 8, acknowledging that Iran's purpose in the hack was to influence the 2024 U.S. presidential election.) Although the Trump campaign was aware of the hack, it did not immediately report it to law enforcement. A few weeks after Stone learned about the hack of his Hotmail account, the FBI alerted Stone that his Gmail account had also been compromised.

In late June and early July, Iranian hackers emailed people associated with the Biden campaign, revealing an excerpt of an email the hackers had stolen from the Trump campaign. Federal investigators found no evidence that any of the recipients replied.

The hackers also leaked the stolen information to the media. Beginning on July 22, Politico received emails from an AOL Mail account identified as "Robert" with internal communications from the Trump campaign, including a 271-page vetting report on vice presidential candidate JD Vance's potential vulnerabilities, and another document on Marco Rubio, whom Trump had also considered as a running mate. The account did not state how it obtained the documents. Politico publicly reported the incident on August 10. The Washington Post and The New York Times also reported having received hacked materials similar to those described by Politico. On September 26, journalist Ken Klippenstein published the full Vance dossier in his newsletter.

On August 10, following Politico's report, the Trump campaign confirmed it had been hacked. On August 12, the Harris campaign (formerly the Biden campaign) likewise acknowledged having been targeted by a failed spear phishing attack by Iran. On August 19, American intelligence agencies confirmed that Iran had hacked the Trump campaign and attempted to hack the Biden–Harris campaign through social engineering. Information from the hack of the Trump campaign was sent to member of the Harris campaign. The Harris campaign indicated staffers initially mistook the information as phishing without connecting it to the Iranian hacking incident. The campaign has also indicated they made no use of any hacked materials.

On September 23, Reuters cited a US Intelligence official saying that Iran was trying to stoke division using both English and Spanish language messaging on polarizing issues as Israel and the conflict in Gaza as well as messaging on the presidential candidates.

On September 25, U.S. officials and lawmakers stated that Iran was attempting to assassinate Trump and former Trump administration officials, but that there was no evidence that the prior assassination attempts against Trump were related to Iran. The Trump campaign said the Office of the Director of National Intelligence briefed them on the matter on September 24 and that it discussed "real and specific threats from Iran to assassinate him in an effort to destabilize and sow chaos in the United States." The ODNI confirmed the meeting but refused to discuss specifics of what was discussed. Trump has claimed without evidence that his assassination attempts in Butler, Pennsylvania and at his golf course in Florida might have involved Iran.

On September 27, the Department of Justice unsealed an indictment charging three men working for the IRGC with hacking Trump's campaign.

On November 8, three men were charged in U.S. federal court with an IRGC-linked plot to assassinate Trump.

== Reactions ==
Chris Krebs, the former director of the Cybersecurity and Infrastructure Security Agency, wrote on X, "Someone is running the 2016 playbook."

On August 16, OpenAI stated that it had prevented an Iranian misinformation campaign that included falsehoods about the 2024 election.

On August 19, a joint statement by officials from the FBI, ODNI and the Cybersecurity and Infrastructure Security Agency stated that "Iran seeks to stoke discord and undermine confidence in our democratic institutions" and that the Islamic Republic had "demonstrated a longstanding interest in exploiting societal tensions through various means".

On August 23, Meta announced that it had blocked WhatsApp accounts associated with APT42. The accounts had posed as tech support for companies such as Google and Microsoft, and targeted "political and diplomatic officials, and other public figures, including some associated with administrations of President Biden and former President Trump." Some of the people who were targeted had reported suspicious messages to WhatsApp, prompting Meta to investigate; it judged that the targeted accounts had not been compromised.

On September 19, U.S. House Speaker Mike Johnson said in an interview he was "not surprised" to hear reports of election interference after Iran reportedly hacked the Trump campaign.

Iran has called allegations of its interference "unsubstantiated and devoid of any standing" and that the "Islamic Republic of Iran harbors neither the intention nor the motive to interfere with the U.S. presidential election".

== Analysis ==
Analysis of Iranian interference has suggested Trump's withdrawal from the 2015 nuclear deal and the 2020 assassination of Qasem Soleimani may play a role in Iranian efforts to denigrate Trump. However, The New York Times stated Iran's attacks against Biden and Harris suggest "a wider goal of sowing internal discord and discrediting the democratic system in the United States more broadly in the eyes of the world." It cited two Iranian officials who said Iran was "largely unconcerned with the ultimate victor in November" and believes "that Washington's animosity transcends either political party".

Iranian interference has been described by U.S. intelligence officials as "more aggressive" than in the past. On September 23, 2024, officials from the Office of the Director of National Intelligence (ODNI) and the FBI stated Iran has used artificial intelligence to create fake news articles in English and Spanish about the war in Gaza to promote division and boost anti-American influence campaigns. Though officials continue to monitor the use of AI in election interference, they currently assess these efforts as "a malign influence accelerant, not yet a revolutionary influence tool."

== See also ==
- Chinese interference in the 2024 United States elections
- Foreign electoral intervention
- List of foreign electoral interventions
- Russian interference in the 2024 United States elections
