= Andrea De Maria =

Italian politician (born 1966)

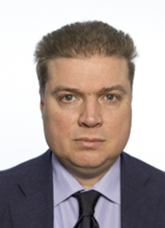
- De Maria in 2018

Member of the Chamber of Deputies
- Incumbent
- Assumed office 15 March 2013
- Constituency: Emilia-Romagna (2013–2018); Emilia-Romagna – 06 (2018–2022); Emilia-Romagna – 07 (2022–present)

Personal details
- Born: 5 October 1966 (age 59)
- Party: Democratic Party (since 2007)

Andrea De Maria (born 5 October 1966) is an Italian politician serving as a member of the Chamber of Deputies since 2013. From 1995 to 2004, he served as mayor of Marzabotto.
