= Lega Emilia =

- Secretary: Matteo Rancan
- Founded: 1989 (as LER); 1991 (as LNE); 2020 (as LE)
- Ideology: Regionalism; Federalism; Populism
- National affiliation: Lega Nord (1991–2020); Lega per Salvini Premier (2020–present)
- Legislative Assembly of Emilia-Romagna: 7 / 50
- Chamber of Deputies (Emilia seats): 10 / 35
- Senate (Emilia-Romagna seats): 6 / 22

Website
- https://legaemiliasalvinipremier.it

Proposed flag of Emilia by Lega Nord Emilia

Lega Emilia (English: League Emilia), whose complete name is Lega Emilia per Salvini Premier (English: League Emilia for Salvini Premier), is a regionalist political party active in Emilia, part of Emilia-Romagna region. Established in 1989, it was one of the founding "national" sections of Lega Nord (LN) in 1991 and has been the regional section of Lega per Salvini Premier (LSP) in Emilia since 2020.

The party's leader is Matteo Rancan, who also leads of the joint group with Lega Romagna in the Legislative Assembly of Emilia-Romagna.

== History ==
The party was founded in 1989 by Giorgio Conca, a leading member of Lega Lombarda, and Carla Uccelli, as Lega Emiliano-Romagnola (LER), thus comprising also Romagna.

Soon after the LER was joined by Fabio Dosi, who was elected secretary.

The party participated to the 1989 European Parliament election as part of the coalition Lega Lombarda – Alleanza Nord.

In 1989–1990, the LER took part in the process of federating the Northern regionalist parties, ahead of the regional elections, taking the current name, upon the separation from Lega Nord Romagna (LNR). Since then LNE and LNR have been the two regional sections of Lega Nord in Emilia-Romagna, but continue to cooperate in regional politics.

From 2002 to 2012, the party was led by Angelo Alessandri, who also served as federal president of Lega Nord from 2005 to 2012. At the 2008 general election the party elected four deputies (including Alessandri and Gianluca Pini, leader of Lega Nord Romagna) and two senators (including Angela Maraventano, leader of Extreme South and Deputy-Mayor of Lampedusa).

In May 2012, Alessandri stepped down from secretary and was replaced by Fabio Rainieri, an ally of Roberto Maroni and one of the leaders of the party's agricultural wing. Rainieri, who had formerly been president, was elected with the support of 173 delegates at the party's congress, while his opponent Riad Ghelfi had secured just 93. Some weeks later, Manes Bernardini, a party's rising star from Bologna, was elected president by the party's national council with 70% of the vote. In November Alessandri left the party altogether. At the same time a group of activists quit in order to join Matteo Renzi's campaign for the 2012 centre-left primary election.

In June 2014, Pietro Pisani replaced Bernardini as national president. Bernardini would leave the party altogether in October.

In the 2014 regional election, the joint list of LNE and LNR obtained its best result so far in a regionwide election (19.4%).

In December 2015, during a national congress, Gianluca Vinci (204 votes) beat Matteo Rancan (143) and was elected secretary. The vote was setback for Lega Nord's federal secretary Matteo Salvini, who supported Rancan: though not an anti-salviniano, Vinci was once close to Flavio Tosi, a Venetian leader who was ejected by Salvini from the party earlier that year, and a more independent figure. In January 2016 Giovanni Tombolato was elected national president.

In the 2019 European Parliament election, the party obtained 33.8%, its best result ever. In the 2020 Emilia-Romagna regional election, LNE's Lucia Borgonzoni posed the strongest challenge so far to the dominant PD, but stopped at 43.6% and was defeated, while the League's list obtained 32.0%.

Following the formation of Lega per Salvini Premier and the 2019 federal congress of the LN, after which the latter became practically inactive, in February 2020 the LNE was re-established as Lega Emilia per Salvini Premier in order to become the regional section of the new party. The founding members of the new LE were Vinci, Borgonzoni, Maurizio Campari, Corrado Pozzi e Aldo Manfredini. Contextually, Pisani was appointed commissioner of the party. A few months later, Pisani was replaced by Andrea Ostellari of Liga Veneta and, in 2022 Rancan succeeded to Ostellari. In 2021, Vinci, who opposed the formation of the Draghi government, switched parties to Brothers of Italy.

In July 2023, during a party congress, Rancan was elected secretary, by beating 63% to 47% his opponent Carlo Piastra.

== Popular support ==
Lega Nord is usually stronger in the outer provinces, both in Emilia and Romagna. In the 2019–2020 elections (European Parliament and Regional Council, respectively) it did better in the provinces of Piacenza (45.3% and 44.0%), Parma (38.8% and 36.5%), Ferrara (41.9% and 41.9%) and Rimini (36.5% and 34.5%).

The combined electoral results of Lega Nord Emilia and Lega Nord Romagna in Emilia-Romagna are shown in the tables below.

1990 regional	1992 general	1994 general	1995 regional	1996 general	1999 European	2000 regional	2001 general	2004 European	2005 regional	2006 general	2008 general	2009 European	2010 regional
2.9	9.6	6.4	3.4	7.2	3.0	2.6	3.3	3.4	4.8	3.9	7.8	11.1	13.7

2013 general	2014 European	2014 regional	2018 general	2019 European	2020 regional	2022 general	2024 European
2.6	5.0	19.4	19.2	33.8	32.0	7.5	6.5

== Leadership ==
- Secretary: Giorgio Conca (1989–1990), Fabio Dosi (1990–1995), Pierluigi Copercini (1995–1996), Maurizio Parma (1996–2002), Angelo Alessandri (2002–2012), Fabio Rainieri (2012–2015), Gianluca Vinci (2015–2020), Pietro Pisani (2020), Andrea Ostellari (commissioner 2020–2022), Matteo Rancan (2022–present, commissioner 2022–2023)
- President: Pierluigi Copercini (1991–1995), Gianni Bettelli (1996–1999), Genesio Ferrari (1999–2002), Villiam Pellacani (2002–2006), Fabio Rainieri (2006–2012), Manes Bernardini (2012–2014), Pietro Pisani (2014–2015), Giovanni Tombolato (2016–2020)
