= Alice Buonguerrieri =

Italian politician (born 1978)

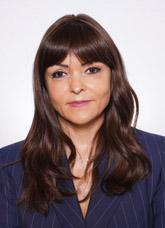
- Buonguerrieri in 2022

Member of the Chamber of Deputies
- Incumbent
- Assumed office 13 October 2022
- Constituency: Emilia-Romagna – 08

Personal details
- Born: 4 September 1978 (age 47)
- Party: Brothers of Italy (since 2020)

Alice Buonguerrieri (born 4 September 1978) is an Italian politician serving as a member of the Chamber of Deputies since 2022. She has served as coordinator of Brothers of Italy in the province of Forlì-Cesena since 2021.
