= Russian interference in the 2024 United States elections =

The Russian state and government interfered in the 2024 United States elections through disinformation and propaganda campaigns aimed at damaging Joe Biden, Kamala Harris, and other Democrats while boosting the candidacy of Donald Trump and other candidates who support isolationism and undercutting support for Ukraine aid and NATO. Russia's efforts represented the most active threat of foreign interference in the 2024 United States elections and follows Russia's previous pattern of spreading disinformation through fake social-media accounts and right-wing YouTube channels in order to divide American society and foster anti-Americanism. On September 4, 2024, the US Department of Justice indicted members of Tenet Media for having received $9.7 million as part of a covert Russian influence operation to co-opt American right-wing influencers to espouse pro-Russian content and conspiracy theories. Many of the followers of the related influencers were encouraged to steal ballots, intimidate voters, and remove or destroy ballot drop-offs in the weeks leading up to the election.

== Background ==
Russia interfered in the 2016, 2018, 2020, and 2022 United States elections.

The Russian government's goals in 2016 were to sabotage the presidential campaign of Hillary Clinton, boost the presidential campaign of Donald Trump, and increase political and social discord in the United States. According to the US intelligence community, the operation—code-named Project Lakhta—was ordered directly by Russian president Vladimir Putin. The "hacking and disinformation campaign" to damage Clinton and help Trump became the "core of the scandal known as Russiagate". The 448-page Mueller report, made public in April 2019, examined over 200 contacts between the Trump campaign and Russian officials but concluded that there was insufficient evidence to bring specific "conspiracy" or "coordination" charges against Trump or his associates.

The United States Intelligence Community concluded in early 2018 that the Russian government was continuing the interference it started during the 2016 elections and was attempting to influence the 2018 mid-term elections by generating discord through social media. Primaries for candidates of parties began in some states in March and would continue through September. The leaders of intelligence agencies noted that Russia is spreading disinformation through fake social media accounts in order to divide American society and foster anti-Americanism. In 2022, it was reported that a Federal Election Commission investigation had found that American Ethane Company, which had received investments from Russian oligarchs, had contributed Russian money to US political candidates in the 2018 midterm elections, largely in Louisiana. FEC commissioners Ellen Weintraub and Shana M. Broussard criticized the Republicans in the FEC for a "slap on the wrist" civil penalty.

Russian interference in the 2020 United States elections was a matter of concern at the highest level of national security within the United States government, in addition to the computer and social media industries. In February and August 2020, United States Intelligence Community (USIC) experts warned members of Congress that Russia was interfering in the 2020 presidential election in then-President Donald Trump's favor. USIC analysis released by the Office of the Director of National Intelligence (DNI) in March 2021 found that proxies of Russian intelligence promoted and laundered misleading or unsubstantiated narratives about Joe Biden "to US media organizations, US officials, and prominent US individuals, including some close to former President Trump and his administration." The New York Times reported in May 2021 that federal investigators in Brooklyn began a criminal investigation late in the Trump administration into possible efforts by several current and former Ukrainian officials to spread unsubstantiated allegations about corruption by Joe Biden, including whether they had used Trump's personal attorney Rudy Giuliani as a channel.

In September 2023, a declassified intelligence report identified a top aide to Putin hiring three contractors to conduct an online disinformation campaign to reduce western support for Ukraine. One proposal, called the "Good Old U.S.A. Project" aimed to influence the 2024 presidential election. It sought to use hundreds of fake online accounts and eighteen seemingly apolitical "sleeper groups" across six swing states that would wait until the right moment to distribute bogus news stories. The proposal's author alleged that an isolationist view of the Ukraine war had become "central" to the presidential race, and that Russia must "put a maximum effort to ensure that the Republican point of view (first and foremost the opinion of Trump's supporters) wins over the US public opinion".

A declassified intelligence report in December 2023 assessed with "high confidence" that Russian interfered during the 2022 midterms in efforts that grew from its prior attempts during the 2018 midterms. Efforts were described as seeking "to denigrate the Democratic Party before the midterm elections and undermine confidence in the election, most likely to undermine US support for Ukraine". It highlighted efforts to delay a withdrawal from the Ukrainian city of Kherson until after the midterms to avoid giving a named political party a political win, targeting constituencies more sympathetic to Russia's "traditional values", and weakening confidence in Western democratic institutions by casting "aspersions on the integrity of the midterm elections, including by claiming that voting software was vulnerable, Americans expected cheating to undermine the midterm elections, and Democrats were stealing the elections".

== Analysis ==
Senior officials with the Office of the Director of National Intelligence describe Russia's 2024 efforts as "more sophisticated than in prior election cycles". Rather than simply relying on fake accounts, Russian tactics involve co-opting real American right-wing influencers to spread pro-Kremlin propaganda narratives to Americans. Officials from the ODNI and FBI have outlined Russia's use of generative artificial intelligence to denigrate Harris with doctored and fake text, images, video, and audio content and outlined efforts to promote divisive content to spread anti-Americanism. Officials have assessed that Russia is attempting to fool unwitting Americans into spreading its messages and is imitating websites of established media and using human commentators to increase traffic towards those sites, which have content generated by artificial intelligence.

== Efforts to interfere with the 2024 United States elections ==
According to disinformation experts and intelligence agencies, Russia spread disinformation ahead of the 2024 election to damage Joe Biden and Democrats, boost candidates supporting isolationism, and undercut support for Ukraine aid and NATO. American intelligence agencies have assessed that Russia prefers Trump to win the election, viewing him as more skeptical of US support for Ukraine. Following the withdrawal of Biden from the presidential race, Microsoft reported that Russian intelligence "struggled to pivot" to attacking Harris, but by late August and early September videos attacking Harris and her supporters started to appear. In late October 2024, it was reported that Russia was using Reddit and far-right forums to target potential Trump supporters in swing states, focusing on Hispanic voters and the gaming community.

In August 2024, the Federal Bureau of Investigation raided the homes of former United Nations weapons inspector Scott Ritter and political advisor Dimitri Simes for their connections to Russian state media. Indictments against Dimitri Simes and his wife Anastasia Simes were announced in early September. The two were charged with laundering funds and violating sanctions in order to benefit the state-controlled broadcaster Channel One Russia, as well as violating sanctions to benefit a Russian oligarch.

On September 4, 2024, the United States publicly accused Russia of interfering in the 2024 election and announced several steps to combat Russian influence including sanctions, indictments, and seizing of Doppelganger-linked web domains used to spread propaganda and disinformation. Two employees of the Russian state-owned propaganda network RT (Kostiantyn Kalashnikov and Elena Afansayeva) were indicted for conspiracy and violations of the Foreign Agents Registration Act for operating a money laundering operation that had sent at least $9.7 million to support the creation and distribution of propaganda videos on American social media. The indictment revealed a key Russian tactic to interfere with the 2024 United States presidential election is to recruit right-wing influencers. Right-wing podcasters and influencers paid for the creation of pro-Russia content included Tim Pool, Dave Rubin, and Benny Johnson, among others. The indictment does not name the influencers, who claim not to have known about any Russian ties. This prompted YouTube to remove several channels, and Tenet Media, a company implicated in the affair, abruptly shut down.

On September 13, the United States, Canada, and Britain announced new sanctions to cut off financing for disinformation operations and accused Russian state-owned broadcast company RT as acting as a covert arm of Russian intelligence and taking orders from the Kremlin. The announcement highlighted RT's cooperation with the FSB, the Social Design Agency and Structura, and highlighted its efforts in other countries across the globe to subvert democratic processes and shift opinion towards pro-Russian viewpoints. In response to the indictment, Meta and YouTube banned RT channels and other Russian media outlets.

On September 17, Microsoft reported that Russian operatives had intensified attacks against Kamala Harris by creating videos highlighting "outlandish conspiracy theories" aimed at stoking racial and political divisions. Mentioned videos that had been viewed millions of times included a fake video of a Harris supporter attacking an attendee at a Trump rally and another staged video that falsely claimed Harris had paralyzed a young girl in a hit-and-run accident in 2011. The video was promoted through a fake website masquerading as a local San Francisco media outlet.

On September 23, Reuters cited a US Intelligence official saying that of the foreign adversaries, Russia was creating the most AI content to influence the 2024 election and improve Donald Trump's chances of winning. The anonymous official from the Office of the Director of National Intelligence reported artificial intelligence was officially being used to create negative media, often posted under the guise of fake US news publications. Though officials continue to monitor the use of AI in election interference, they currently assess these efforts as "a malign influence accelerant, not yet a revolutionary influence tool."

By October, state-run media campaigns by Russia had spread misinformation about the 2024 Atlantic hurricane season that The Associated Press described as using "social media and state news stories to criticize responses to past US natural disasters" and sow division among Americans, including the spread of AI-generated images of flooding damage at Cinderella Castle at Walt Disney World, among other images.

On October 19, the State Department announced a $10 million reward for information leading to any foreign individual or entity engaging in election interference. It also highlighted Russian media company Rybar LLC, which it said attempts to "sow discord, promote social division, stoke partisan and racial discord, and encourage hate and violence in the United States" and advance "pro-Russian and anti-Western narratives". It specifically singled out nine individuals involved in the companies malign influence operations and encouraged individuals to contact the Rewards for Justice tipline.

On October 21, Wired reported that the Russian propaganda network Storm-1516 had been spreading fabricated claims about Democratic vice-presidential candidate Tim Walz. Experts on disinformation campaigns had also linked Storm-1516 to the conspiracy theory about Harris' supposed hit-and-run accident. Two days later, The Washington Post reported that John Mark Dugan, a former deputy sheriff of Palm Beach County, has been paid by the GRU to produce misinformation attacking the Harris campaign. On October 25, the US Intelligence Community assessed that Russia had made a fake, viral video of mail-in ballots for Trump being ripped up and burned in Pennsylvania.

On November 1, US intelligence confirmed that Russia was behind a fake, viral video of supposed Haitian immigrants saying they were voting multiple times for Harris in Georgia. They also confirmed Russia was behind a fake post on X claiming Harris and her husband had tipped off Sean Combs about an FBI raid in exchange for $500,000.

On November 4, the Office of the Director of National Intelligence (ODNI), FBI, and the Cybersecurity and Infrastructure Security Agency (CISA) issued a joint statement that Russian "influence actors" were creating and circulating material "intended to undermine public confidence in the integrity of US elections and stoke divisions among Americans", focusing their efforts on swing states.

On November 5, during the official Election Day, several non-credible bomb threats that originated from Russia briefly disrupted voting in two polling places in Fulton County, Georgia. Both re-opened after about 30 minutes. Republican Georgia Secretary of State Brad Raffensperger said Russian interference was behind the Election Day bomb hoaxes. In a statement, the FBI said it was aware of non-credible bomb threats to polling locations in several states, with many of them originating from Russian email domains. The bomb threats were solely made against Democratic-leaning areas. On the same day, US federal officials again reported that Russian sources were actively engaged in "influence operations", citing disinformation in specific videos that falsely claimed Kamala Harris had taken a bribe and false news stories about the Democratic Party and election fraud in Georgia.

On November 8, it was reported that one of the Russian email addresses behind Election Day bomb threats was used in June 2024 bomb threats targeting LGBTQ+ events in Massachusetts, Minnesota and Texas. NBC News reported on the same day that, out of 67 known bomb threats in 19 counties on Election Day, 56 were in 11 highly populated counties where Joe Biden won the majority of the vote in the 2020 election. These counties were in Arizona, Wisconsin, Michigan, Georgia, and Pennsylvania, all of which are considered swing states. Georgia alone had over 60 bomb threats on Election Day, while Pennsylvania had threats in at least 32 counties. While Russian email addresses were used for some of the threats, as of November 2024, the identity of the perpetrator or perpetrators is unknown.

Bomb threats were also sent after Election Day in over half of the counties in Minnesota, 15 jurisdictions in Maryland, and five counties in California. The Brennan Center for Justice recorded at least 227 bomb threats that "targeted polling locations, election offices, and tabulation centers" across the United States during and shortly after Election Day.

These bomb threats have been characterized by journalists as an escalation by Russia, designed to send a message about American support for Ukraine.

== Aftermath ==
On November 7, Russia-1, a Russian state TV network, broadcast nude images of Melania Trump on a political talk show hosted by Yevgeny Popov and Olga Skabeyeva.

On November 11, Nikolai Patrushev, an aide to Putin, stated, "To achieve success in the elections, Donald Trump relied on certain forces to which he has corresponding obligations. And as a responsible person, he will be obliged to fulfill them. ... [In] January 2025, it will be time for the specific actions of the elected president. It is known that election promises in the United States can often diverge from subsequent actions." He also referred to the assassinations and assassination attempts against American presidents throughout history, and the attempts against Trump in particular, saying that "it is extremely important for US intelligence agencies to prevent a repetition of such cases." Slate described this message as either a public blackmail threat against Trump or an attempt to weaken democracy in the West.

Several journalists reported that Artem Klyushin, who had previously been named in American government investigations about Russian interference during the 2016 election, had publicly listed on social media numerous recommendations for the cabinet of Trump's second administration, several of which had since been nominated. These posts, directed at Trump and Elon Musk, also included policy recommendations that were similar to Trump's public statements.

Aleksandr Dugin had celebrated Trump's re-election, stating that "'Putinism' has triumphed in the United States" and advocating for Russian victory in the Russo-Ukrainian War. He also said that "One of the ideologues of Trumpism, Curtis Yarvin, has declared that it's time to establish a monarchy in the United States. If Republicans gain a majority in both houses, what could stop them?"

== See also ==
- Artificial intelligence and elections
- Chinese interference in the 2024 United States elections
- Donald Trump 2024 presidential campaign – American political campaign
- Russian interference in the 2016 United States elections
- Russian interference in the 2020 United States elections
- Timelines related to Donald Trump and Russian interference in United States elections – All the Trump Russia timelines
- Transnational repression by Russia – Efforts by the government of the Russian Federation to control its diaspora and exiles
