= Chinese interference in the 2024 United States elections =

The Chinese Communist Party (CCP) and government of China interfered in the 2024 United States elections through propaganda and disinformation campaigns, primarily linked to its Spamouflage influence operation. Cyberespionage and wire-tapping operations were launched against US politicians by Salt Typhoon, an advanced persistent threat group linked to the Ministry of State Security. The efforts came amidst other foreign interference in the 2024 United States elections.

== Background ==
In March 2021, the National Intelligence Council released a report that said the Chinese government "considered but did not deploy" influence efforts in 2020. A declassified US intelligence assessment in 2023 said with "high confidence" that China, Russia, Iran and Cuba attempted to influence the 2022 midterms. It said that China had tacitly approved "efforts to try to influence a handful of midterm races involving members of both US political parties" and "portray the US democratic model as chaotic, ineffective, and unrepresentative". The assessment said that China had used images generated by artificial intelligence to mimic Americans online and provoke discussion on divisive social issues, and that they believed they would face less scrutiny during the midterms and that US retaliation would be lower. It also said that since 2020, senior Chinese intelligence officials had issued directives to "intensify efforts to influence US policy and public opinion in China's favor" and "magnify US societal divisions". In January 2024, the FBI and Justice Department issued a court order to address Chinese hacking and infiltration of key US infrastructure in the transportation and maritime sectors.

During APEC United States 2023, Joe Biden and General Secretary of the Chinese Communist Party Xi Jinping met in a separate summit on November 15 where Xi told Biden that China would not interfere in the 2024 presidential election after being asked by Biden. This assurance was given again by director of the Office of the Central Foreign Affairs Commission Wang Yi to Biden's national security advisor Jake Sullivan on the weekend of January 26–27 during a meeting in Bangkok after Sullivan brought up the topic. CNN reported in January 2024 that the topic had repeatedly come up during senior-level meetings between the two nations which were held following a shootdown of a Chinese spy balloon by the US military after it traversed the continental United States in February 2023.

== Analysis ==
US intelligence agencies have described Chinese government interference in the elections as aggressive but overall cautious and nuanced, not targeting any particular candidate, but instead focusing on issues important to Beijing such as Taiwan, and "undermining confidence in elections, voting, and the US in general." However, China has specifically denigrated President Biden using fake accounts. According to The Washington Post, a senior official with the Office of the Director of National Intelligence said China is "not attempting to influence the presidential race, but it is seeking to do so in state-level and regional races" as they did during the 2022 midterms. Officials from the ODNI and FBI have outlined China's use of generative artificial intelligence tools and promotion of divisive content focused on drug use, immigration, and abortion to foster anti-Americanism.

== Efforts to interfere in the 2024 United States elections ==
As early as April 1, 2024, The New York Times reported that the Chinese government had created fake pro-Trump accounts on social media "promoting conspiracy theories, stoking domestic divisions and attacking President Biden ahead of the election in November."

In August 2024, cyber security firm CyberCX released a report that it said uncovered Beijing-based "Green Cicada," one of the largest publicly identified networks and which may feature more than 8,000 accounts on social media platform X, with a suspected intention to interfere with the US elections.

Research firm Graphika reported that Chinese government interference has been linked to its Spamouflage influence operation and has involved networks of fake social media users that mimic Americans on social media sites such as X and TikTok in an attempt to manipulate and sway public opinion. According to a September 2024 Graphika report, "In the run-up to the 2024 election, these accounts have seeded and amplified content denigrating Democratic and Republican candidates, sowing doubt in the legitimacy of the US electoral process, and spreading divisive narratives about sensitive social issues including gun control, homelessness, drug abuse, racial inequality, and the Israel–Hamas conflict. This content, some of which was almost certainly AI-generated, has targeted President Joe Biden, former President Donald Trump, and, more recently, Vice President Kamala Harris."

In August 2024, a threat report by Meta stated it detected 11 'coordinated inauthentic behavior' networks linked to China. Microsoft detected attempts by Chinese actors to inflame tensions around campus protests, noting an increased capability to increase divisions and influence election activity.

In October 2024, The Washington Post reported on increasing Chinese government attempts to influence "tens" of down-ballot races with explicitly antisemitic attacks and conspiracy theories against politicians as part of its Spamouflage influence operation. The report highlighted one covert influence campaign against Representative Barry Moore who recently backed sanctions against China and is not Jewish, calling him "a Jewish dog" who won because of "the bloody Jewish consortium" among other antisemitic posts. It also reported on increasing efforts to inflame tensions by focusing on hot-button issues such as police violence, Black Lives Matter, immigration, and influencing US foreign policy toward Taiwan. It said state-run media campaigns by China also spread false conspiracy theories about the 2024 Atlantic hurricane season that The Associated Press described as using "social media and state news stories to criticize responses to past US natural disasters" and sow division among Americans. Spamouflage has also targeted the congressional races of Michael McCaul and Marsha Blackburn as well as Marco Rubio due to their outspoken criticism of the Chinese government and its policies.

On October 25, 2024, The New York Times reported that Chinese government-linked hackers had targeted the phones of Trump and Vance. The hacks came a month after The Wall Street Journal reported on Chinese hackers breaching several US internet service providers as part of its "Salt Typhoon" cyber espionage campaign.

== Reactions ==
US Secretary of State Antony Blinken said the US has seen evidence of attempts to "influence and arguably interfere" with the upcoming US elections, despite an earlier commitment from Xi Jinping not to do so. In an interview with Time, President Biden said that there was evidence of China interfering in the 2024 elections, and that "all the bad guys are rooting for Trump".

In a September 2024 interview with the Associated Press, chief intelligence officer Jack Stubbs of Graphika stated that Chinese covert influence operations had "become more aggressive" in their "efforts to infiltrate and to sway US political conversations ahead of the election".

In 2023, the Chinese Ministry of Foreign Affairs denied that China was interfering or had interfered in the 2022 election, stating that they "adhere to the principle of non-interference in other countries' internal affairs" and that "China does not interfere in US elections". In response to a 2024 report by Graphika that outlined China's use of its Spamouflage network to mimic American social media users, Chinese Embassy spokesperson Liu Pengyu stated that the findings were "prejudice and malicious speculation" and that "China has no intention and will not interfere" in the election.

== See also ==
- Artificial intelligence and elections
- Donald Trump 2024 presidential campaign
- Chinese intelligence activity abroad
- Foreign electoral intervention
- List of foreign electoral interventions
- Neville Roy Singham
- Party for Socialism and Liberation
- Russian interference in the 2024 United States elections
