= Guglielmo Golinelli =

Italian politician (born 1987)

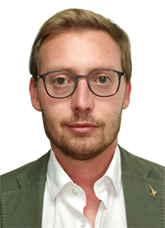
- Golinelli in 2020

Member of the Chamber of Deputies
- In office 23 March 2018 – 12 October 2022
- Constituency: Emilia-Romagna – P02

Personal details
- Born: 31 October 1987 (age 38)
- Party: National Future (since 2026)

Guglielmo Golinelli (born 31 October 1987) is an Italian politician. From 2018 to 2022, he was a member of the Chamber of Deputies. From 2023 to 2026, he served as secretary of Lega in the province of Modena.
