= Laura Cavandoli =

Italian politician (born 1971)

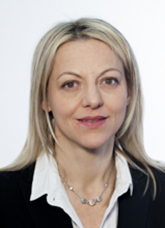
- Cavandoli in 2018

Member of the Chamber of Deputies
- Incumbent
- Assumed office 23 March 2018
- Constituency: Emilia-Romagna – U12 (2018–2022); Emilia-Romagna – U02 (2022–present)

Personal details
- Born: 15 December 1971 (age 54)
- Party: Lega

Laura Cavandoli (born 15 December 1971) is an Italian politician serving as a member of the Chamber of Deputies since 2018. She has been a municipal councillor of Parma since 2017. From 2013 to 2016, she was a municipal councillor of Neviano degli Arduini.
