= Gianluca Vinci =

Italian politician (born 1980)

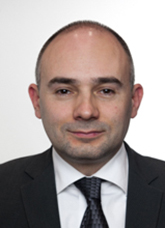
- Vinci in 2022

Member of the Chamber of Deputies
- Incumbent
- Assumed office 23 March 2018
- Constituency: Emilia-Romagna – 04 (2018–2022); Emilia-Romagna – 02 (2022–present)

Personal details
- Born: 28 May 1980 (age 45)
- Party: Brothers of Italy (since 2021)

Gianluca Vinci (born 28 May 1980) is an Italian politician serving as a member of the Chamber of Deputies since 2018. From 2015 to 2020, he served as secretary of Lega Emilia.
