= Elena Murelli =

Italian politician (born 1975)

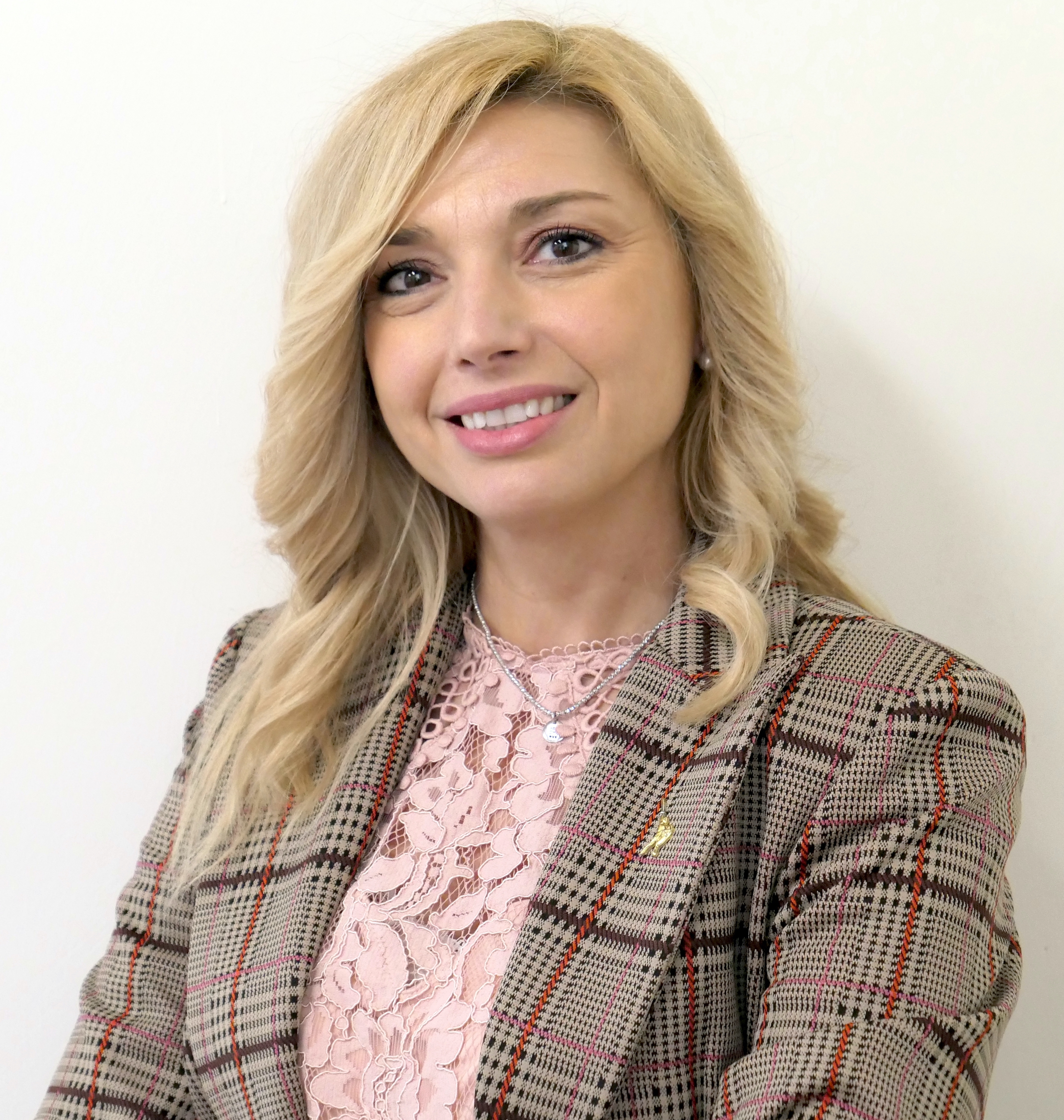
- Murelli in 2021

Member of the Senate
- Incumbent
- Assumed office 13 October 2022
- Constituency: Emilia-Romagna – U01

Member of the Chamber of Deputies
- In office 23 March 2018 – 12 October 2022
- Constituency: Emilia-Romagna – P04

Personal details
- Born: 29 July 1975 (age 50)
- Party: Lega

Elena Murelli (born 29 July 1975) is an Italian politician serving as a member of the Senate since 2022. From 2018 to 2022, she was a member of the Chamber of Deputies.
