= Christian Diego Di Sanzo =

Italian politician

Christian Di Sanzo

Member of the Chamber of Deputies
- Incumbent
- Assumed office 13 October 2022
- Constituency: North and Central America

Personal details
- Born: Prato, Tuscany, Italy
- Profession: Engineer

Christian Di Sanzo is an engineer who is currently serving as a member of the Chamber of Deputies from the North and Central America constituency of the Italian Parliament.
