= Jacopo Morrone =

Italian politician (born 1983)

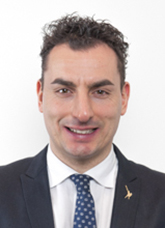
- Morrone in 2018

Member of the Chamber of Deputies
- Incumbent
- Assumed office 23 March 2018
- Constituency: Emilia-Romagna – 01 (2018–2022); Emilia-Romagna – 11 (2022–present)

Personal details
- Born: 23 January 1983 (age 43)
- Party: Lega

Jacopo Morrone (born 23 January 1983) is an Italian politician serving as a member of the Chamber of Deputies since 2018. From 2018 to 2019, he served as undersecretary of the Ministry of Justice.
