= Spamouflage =

Chinese government online influence operation

Spamouflage (also known under the names Dragonbridge, Spamouflage Dragon, Storm 1376 and Taizi Flood) is an online propaganda and disinformation operation. Since 2017, it has used a network of social media accounts to make posts in favor of the Chinese Communist Party and government of the People's Republic of China and harass dissidents and journalists overseas.

Beginning in the early 2020s, Spamouflage accounts also began making posts about American and Taiwanese politics. It is widely believed that the Chinese government, particularly the Ministry of Public Security, is behind the network. Spamouflage has increasingly used generative AI for influence operations. The campaign has largely failed to receive views from real users, although it has attracted some organic engagement using new tactics.

== History ==
In September 2019, research firm Graphika published a report identifying a network of spam accounts across different social media platforms making posts supporting the Chinese government and attacking its critics, naming the network "Spamouflage Dragon" due to its tactic of mixing in non-political spam content as camouflage. The network initially targeted exiled businessman Guo Wengui in 2018 and gradually also added criticisms of the 2019–2020 Hong Kong protests. The spam network's content did not receive much genuine engagement or views from real users, and the report concluded at the time that the low quality of the operation suggests that "it was not a state-backed operation".

In early 2020, after becoming mostly dormant for a period of time following takedowns by social media platforms that occurred as a result of the 2019 Graphika report, the Spamouflage network reemerged with a focus on praising the Chinese government response to COVID-19 in addition to posting about its previous topics of interest.

In February 2021, a Graphika report indicated that some accounts in the Spamouflage network had begun to see some success in receiving views from real users. Instead of solely using disposable spam accounts, Spamouflage began using accounts with a veneer of plausibility, developing fictional personas and co-opting the identities of stolen accounts. Spamouflage posts began to be amplified through retweets by Chinese government officials, including Zhao Lijian and then-ambassador to Venezuela Li Baorong. Its posts closely followed Chinese government messaging and had a new focus on aggressively criticizing the United States and both of its major political parties.

In October 2022, Google's Mandiant reported that Spamouflage, which it calls Dragonbridge, was spreading propaganda and disinformation targeting the 2022 United States midterm elections. One video discouraged Americans from voting and cast doubt on the American political system.

In April 2023, the United States Department of Justice (DOJ) unsealed an indictment against 34 officers of China's Ministry of Public Security (MPS) accused of running a disinformation campaign targeting US-based Chinese dissidents. Meta Platforms and private researchers cited by CNN believe that they are linked to Spamouflage, although the DOJ did not explicitly refer to Spamouflage by name.

In August 2023, Meta announced a takedown of nearly 9000 accounts and pages associated with Spamouflage; their threat intelligence report also covered the propaganda campaign's activities on YouTube, TikTok, and other social media platforms. They also indicated that Spamouflage had created a fake research paper blaming the United States for COVID-19 and attempted to publicize it via various social media networks.

In April 2024, Institute for Strategic Dialogue researchers stated that some Spamouflage accounts had begun making posts about American politics under false American personas, a strategy that was previously used by Russian disinformation campaigns. Under this new strategy, Spamouflage accounts pretending to be supporters of Donald Trump received engagement from real users, with one post being retweeted by conspiracy theorist Alex Jones. The researchers indicated that they did not find Spamouflage accounts pretending to be Joe Biden supporters, although the existence of such accounts could not be ruled out. The same month, Spamouflage accounts used the 2024 pro-Palestinian protests on university campuses to stoke outrage, according to Microsoft. In May 2024, OpenAI removed accounts used by Spamouflage in influence operations. Spamouflage was identified as interfering with the 2024 United States presidential election through fake accounts posing as Americans posting divisive content. Several of the accounts were believed to be created using AI. US intelligence analysts described the efforts as not supporting any particular candidate, but focusing on issues important to Beijing such as Taiwan, and "undermining confidence in elections, voting, and the U.S. in general." In October 2024, Taiwan's Doublethink Labs and Voice of America found that Spamouflage has also amplified antisemitic tropes and conspiracy theories about the U.S. government. Following the 2026 Japanese general election, Spamouflage-linked accounts targeted Sanae Takaichi.

== Countries and people affected ==
=== Guo Wengui ===
Criticizing exiled businessman Guo Wengui, who has become a prominent critic of the Chinese government, was the initial focus of the Spamouflage network, and Guo has continued to be one of the targets of the network. The prolonged propaganda campaign featured numerous political cartoons attacking Guo and associates such as virologist Li-Meng Yan and Steve Bannon in multiple languages.

=== Overseas journalists ===
A June 2022 report by the Australian Strategic Policy Institute (ASPI) found that several journalists, mostly women of Chinese descent working for overseas media outlets, were subjected to a harassment campaign carried out using Spamouflage accounts in what the ASPI called an instance of "digital transnational repression".

=== Canada ===
In 2023, fabricated videos in which Chinese dissident Liu Xin is depicted via deepfake to be making baseless allegations of legal and ethical violations by Justin Trudeau, Pierre Poilievre and other Canadian politicians were posted by Spamouflage accounts. Global Affairs Canada and Liu both believe that the videos may have sought to discredit Liu and hurt Canadian politicians' perception of him. See also Deepfake

=== Spain ===
During the 2024 Spanish floods, the Chinese state linked 'Spamouflage' campaign impersonated Safeguard Defenders, a Spain-based human rights NGO that monitors disappearances in China, posting content on social media platforms including Facebook, TikTok and X, calling for the overthrow of the Spanish government by using criticism of the Spanish government's response to flooding in Valencia in 2024 to manipulate social media users. According to a Safeguard Defenders director, the organization has been under a "renewed multi-lingual and sustained attack" to discredit the organization after it published research in 2022 documenting the establishment of at least 54 secret Chinese police stations in countries across five continents, including Spain.

=== United States ===
Prior to the 2020 United States presidential election, Spamouflage accounts made posts criticizing Donald Trump in relation to the COVID-19 pandemic, actions he took against China, and the George Floyd protests. Although the network made a large volume of videos, they were of poor quality and received few authentic views. Many of the videos had broken English, and the intended audience of the videos was unclear.

In February 2021, a Graphika report noted that Spamouflage, which previously focused on criticizing Trump and then-Secretary of State Mike Pompeo, began criticizing Biden after the new president was inaugurated. The report concluded that the focus of the network was to spread the narrative of "China's rise and America's fall" rather than partisan election interference.

According to Mandiant, in April 2021, Spamouflage accounts called for protests in New York City against virologist Li-Meng Yan, Guo Wengui and Steve Bannon for spreading "rumors" about COVID-19 and publicized an address purportedly belonging to Guo. Although Spamouflage accounts claimed, sometimes using manipulated images, that the protests were successful, there is no evidence that protesters were successfully mobilized.

A 2022 Mandiant report indicated that Spamouflage accounts had called for protests against proposed rare earth mines in the United States and Canada. The minerals are of strategic importance in electronics manufacturing, and the United States had started trying to increase domestic production to counter China's control over the field. Before the 2022 United States elections, the Spamouflage network made posts casting doubts on the American political system, pointing to examples of political division and violence as purported evidence of the United States' decline. Videos they posted portrayed American elections and the American government as being ineffective in improving Americans' lives.

Start in mid-2023 in the lead-up to the 2024 United States presidential election, Spamouflage accounts began making posts about divisive American political issues targeted to actual Americans. Accounts pretending to be American Donald Trump supporters spread false conspiracy theories about Joe Biden and amplified Russian disinformation about the Russian invasion of Ukraine. In contrast to previous Spamouflage campaigns, these accounts received engagement from real American users.

Spamouflage has made posts criticizing American foreign policy decisions relating to Taiwan, Ukraine, and trade restrictions on China targeting semiconductors. It has also capitalized on the Gaza war to portray the United States as a threat to world peace.

In September 2024, Graphika reported that Chinese Spamouflage operations have involved networks of fake social media users that mimic Americans on social media sites such as X and TikTok in an attempt to manipulate and sway public opinion. According to a September 2024 Graphika report, "In the run-up to the 2024 election, these accounts have seeded and amplified content denigrating Democratic and Republican candidates, sowing doubt in the legitimacy of the U.S. electoral process, and spreading divisive narratives about sensitive social issues including gun control, homelessness, drug abuse, racial inequality, and the Israel-Hamas conflict. This content, some of which was almost certainly AI-generated, has targeted President Joe Biden, former President Donald Trump, and, more recently, Vice President Kamala Harris."

In October 2024, The Washington Post reported that China was using Spamouflage to target Representative Barry Moore (R-AL) with denigrating language and antisemitic tropes. Moore has been critical of the Chinese Communist Party, and has directed support for Taiwanese independence. Moore is not Jewish. Spamouflage has also targeted Marco Rubio as well as the congressional races of Michael McCaul and Marsha Blackburn due to their outspoken criticism of the Chinese government and its policies. The campaign involved dozens of fake accounts. Their content failed to reach a high level of organic engagement and was often shared by other bots, trolls, and Internet researchers. The Chinese embassy called the reports "full of speculations". In the run-up to the 2026 United States elections, accounts linked to Spamouflage posed as U.S. voters to post divisive content, according to Graphika.

=== Taiwan ===
Leading up to the 2024 Taiwanese presidential election, the Spamouflage campaign used generative AI to create memes and videos featuring AI television anchors to attack presidential candidate Lai Ching-te with fabricated corruption allegations. Spamouflage also created a fake audio clip of Terry Gou endorsing another candidate.

=== Vietnam ===
Spamouflage-linked accounts have targeted Vietnam over its activities in the South China Sea.

== Effectiveness ==
=== Low quality and limited authentic engagement ===
The network has largely been ineffective at getting views and engagement from real users. One reason identified for the failure of the propaganda campaign, in contrast to more successful campaigns by Russia and other state actors, is its operators' lack of familiarity with the global information environment owing to the closed-off nature of the Chinese internet. While some new technical tools adopted by Spamouflage operators, such as generative artificial intelligence, may increase the operation's efficiency, they will not necessarily make the operation more effective.

An August 2020 Graphika report noted the poor quality of Spamouflage content. Videos that Graphika discovered contained "clumsy" text-to-speech voiceovers, grammatically incorrect English, and poorly-translated Chinese idiomatic expressions like "cast a chestnut in the fire will burn themselves with fire".

=== Successes ===
Spamouflage has been able to disrupt discussions on controversial subjects by taking up space in search results with spam posts. Additionally, new tactics attempted by the network, such as a small cluster of Twitter accounts discovered in 2024 that pretended to be American supporters of Donald Trump, which researchers named "MAGAflage", have allowed it to receive some real engagement. Researchers have expressed concerns that Spamouflage may start to gain more traction due to amplification by authentic accounts or a scaling up of the MAGAflage strategy.

== Attribution ==
The network has been attributed to the Chinese government by Twitter and Meta. Global Affairs Canada has also linked the campaign to the Chinese government. Sources have linked Spamouflage to the Chinese Ministry of Public Security's "912 Special Project Working Group", which was the subject of a 2023 indictment by the American Department of Justice.

An August 2023 threat report released by Meta notes that the timing of the network's activities match up with office hours in China, and that the network displays coordinated activity across multiple platforms. Institute for Strategic Dialogue researcher Elise Thomas notes that the operation's lack of innovation despite prolonged ineffectiveness is characteristic of a government campaign. In August 2023, Jack Stubbs of Graphika indicated that the firm had seen open source evidence pointing to the involvement of the Chinese group indicted by the DOJ with limited confidence.

Initial reports of Spamouflage's activities did not always attribute the campaign to the Chinese government. Graphika researcher Ben Nimmo speculated in 2019 that amateurs or a private firm was behind the campaign. In 2020, Graphika stated that it was unable to determine the relationship between Spamouflage and the Chinese government.

In a response to CNN, Chinese government spokesperson Liu Pengyu denied China's involvement in Spamouflage.

== See also ==
- Artificial intelligence and elections
- Chinese government interference in Canada
- Chinese information operations and information warfare
- State-sponsored Internet propaganda
- 50 Cent Party
- ChinaAngVirus disinformation campaign
