= Carla Ronci =

Italian Venerable of the Roman Catholic Church (1936–1970)

Venerable Carla Ronci
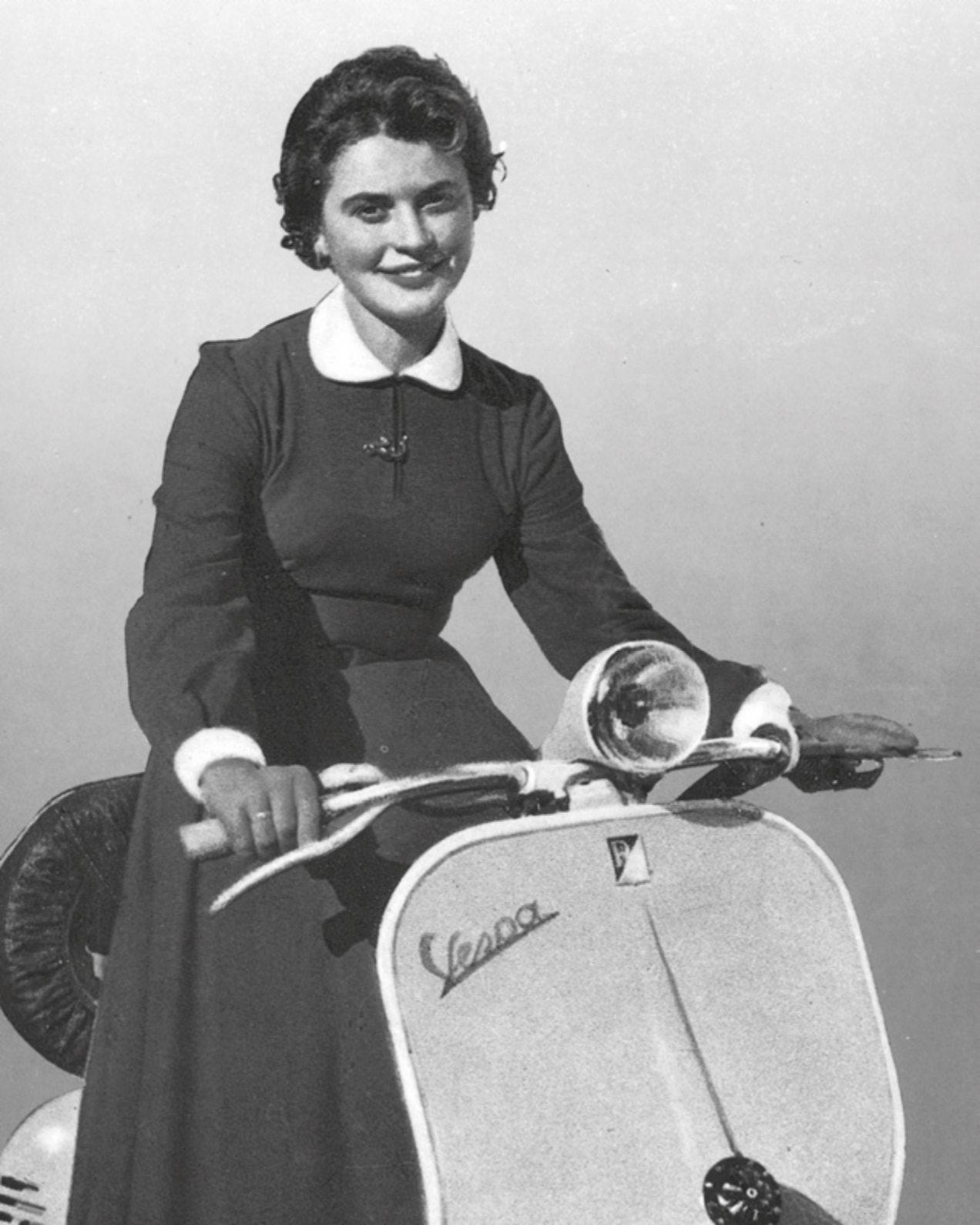
- Born: 11 April 1936; Rimini, Kingdom of Italy
- Died: 2 April 1970 (aged 33); Rimini, Emilia-Romagna, Italy

Carla Ronci (11 April 1936 – 2 April 1970) was an Italian member of the Ancelle Mater Misericordiae of Macerata, a secular institute. She was declared venerable by Pope John Paul II on 7 July 1997.

Born in Rimini, Emilia-Romagna, Ronci spent most of her life in Torre Pedrera, one of the city's northern frazioni. Aged 14, she was drawn to the Ursuline Sisters Daughters of Mary Immaculate, with whom she later discerned a vocation. In 1961, following a short spell in the Ursuline novitiate, Ronci joined the secular institute Ancelle Mater Misericordiae of Macerata. She was notable for her service in her parish church, the Church of the Blessed Virgin of Mount Carmel, and was particularly active in the church's liturgy, youth ministry, and catechesis. Ronci died of cancer in Rimini on 2 April 1970, aged 33.

Ronci is locally remembered as the "Vespa saint" for her use of the scooter, and often described as a "contemplative in action".

== Early life ==
Ronci was born on 11 April 1936 in the "Aiuto Materno" maternity hospital in Rimini, to parents Mario Ronci, a fisherman, and Jolanda Casalboni, a fruit vendor. She was baptised two days later in the same hospital. The eldest of three children, she grew up in Torre Pedrera, a coastal, suburban frazione north of Rimini, in the parish of the Church of the Blessed Virgin of Mount Carmel.

Ronci made her First Confession, First Communion, and Confirmation aged six years old. Her family's financial circumstances did not allow her to progress beyond elementary education: from her fifth grade, she learned to be a seamstress, and looked after a goat to procure fresh milk. In her spare time, Ronci was a babysitter and helped in the family shop.

== Religious life ==
=== Discernment with the Ursulines ===
Ronci began frequenting the Ursuline Sisters of Verona in 1950, aged 14, during the holy year proclaimed by Pope Pius XII. She was struck by the nuns who ran the kindergarten in Torre Pedrera, and began her spiritual journey, guided by the nuns and her parish priest. She abandoned both cinemas and magazines, which she enjoyed.

Ronci joined the youth apostolate of Azione Cattolica, and was entrusted with catechising ten girls, who grew in number to thirty. Ronci was particularly devoted to the Immaculate Heart of Mary, in the spirit of the Militia Immaculatae. She would organise dressmaking workshops for young girls at her home, which became popular social events as well as catechetical classes, a yearly pilgrimage to a sanctuary, an annual children's festival, a play on the parish priest's birthday, and a fabric flower fundraiser for a Catholic university.

On 20 October 1956, Ronci took a private vow of chastity. On 19 August 1957, she made a vow of poverty. She expressed her desire to discern a religious vocation with the Ursulines, but was discouraged by her friends, family, and parish priest.

On 3 February 1958, with her mother's complicity, Ronci escaped to the Ursuline novitiate in Scanzorosciate, Bergamo. She was frequently visited by her father, a staunch communist, who took her home by force on 9 March 1958. Though Ronci returned to the novitiate, after four months, the Mother Superior decided that her family's resistance indicated Ronci's unsuitability for the religious life.

=== Ancelle Mater Misericordiae ===
Returning home, Ronci played an active part in her parish, including in animating the liturgy, the maintenance of the parish library, the church's upkeep and financial management, a small cinema for children, and children's activities and catechesis. She would leave Torre Pedrera occasionally for solitary retirement, especially visiting Camaldoli.

In 1960, Ronci came into contact with the secular institute Ancelle di Mater Misericordiae of Macerata. After attending a course of spiritual exercises with them, she applied to join in 1961. On 6 January 1963, Ronci made her profession of vows, which she offered particularly for the sanctity of priests.

Ronci continued to live in Torre Pedrera, working for Gioventù Femminile, the youth wing of Azione Cattolica. In October 1965, Ronci was entrusted with a small catechetical group for teenagers.

== Death ==
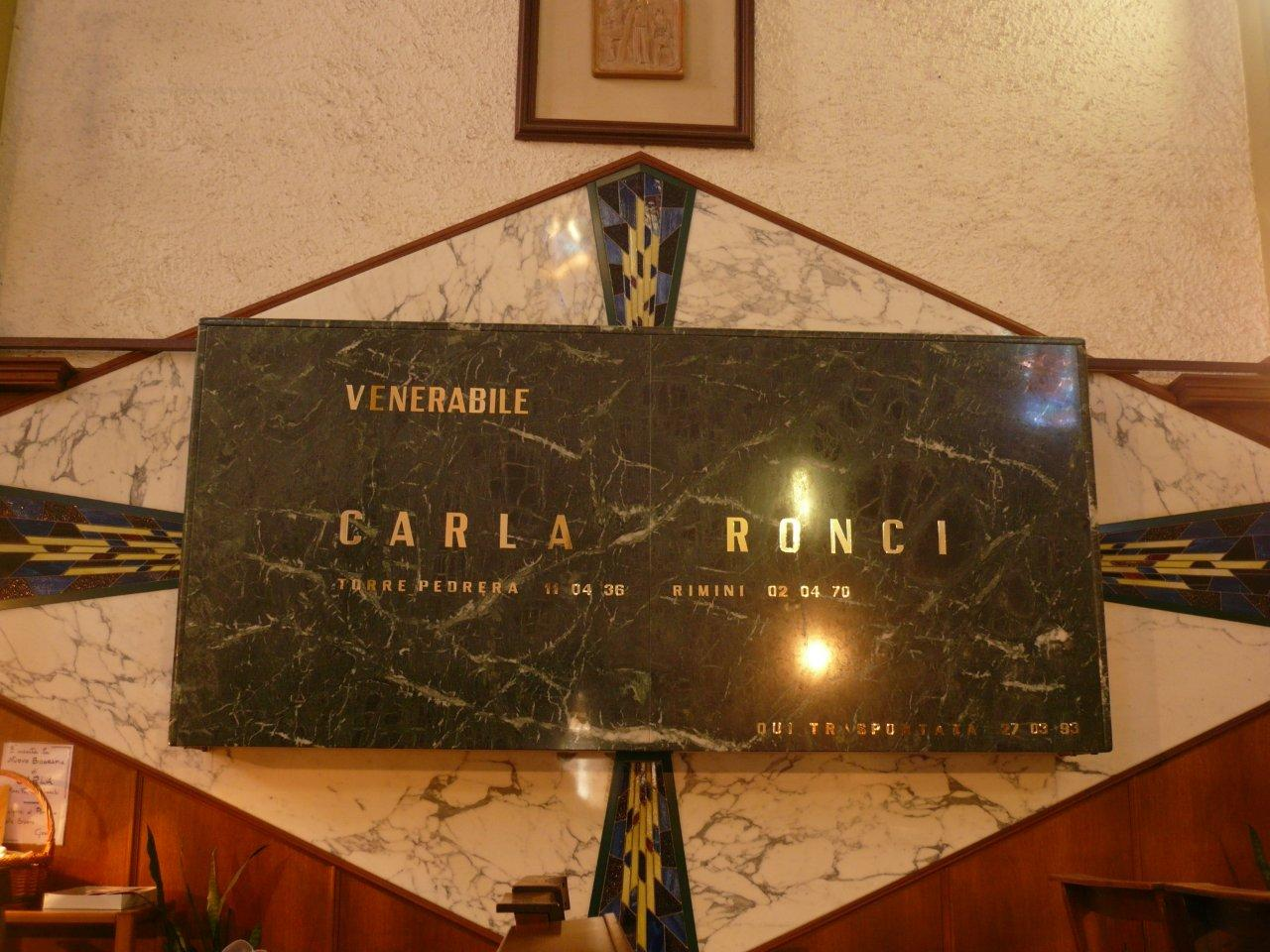
Ronci's tombstone in the Church of the Blessed Virgin of Mount Carmel, Torre Pedrera

In August 1969, Ronci was diagnosed with liver cancer. Following the cancer's spread to her lungs, she was admitted to the Sant'Orsola Hospital in Bologna on 21 January 1970. On 1 April 1970, she was admitted to the "Villa Maria" clinic in Rimini for palliative care, where she was ministered the Last Rites. She died at 5.05pm on 2 April 1970, aged 33, and was buried in Torre Pedrera's Church of the Blessed Virgin of Mount Carmel.

== Beatification ==
Ronci's postulator was Don Fausto Lanfranchi, a priest who was vice-postulator for Alberto Marvelli and Oreste Benzi, and postulator for Sandra Sabattini.

Ronci was proclaimed Venerable by Pope John Paul II on 7 July 1997. She is remembered on the day of her death, 2 April.

== Legacy ==
Roci's marble funerary urn in the Church of the Blessed Virgin of Mount Carmel in Torre Pedrera remains a place of pilgrimage. In October 2010, the church hosted a photographic exhibition on her life. A primary school in Torre Pedrera is named after Ronci. In April 2011, a square in Montecorvino Pugliano was dedicated to her.

Lanfranchi, Ronci's postulator for beatification, authored multiple editions of Ronci's biography, La vita è meravigliosa (Life is Marvellous), and in December 2005, Lanfranchi published Ronci's diary. Her writings have been translated into German, Japanese and Polish, and a German-language website was dedicated to her in 2018.

Amici di Alberto e Carla, a biennial magazine published by the Diocese of Rimini in English and Italian, disseminates information about the lives of Ronci and Alberto Marvelli. In March 2018, the magazine reported 9,000 subscribers in Italian and 1,400 in English.

In summer 2009, the Centro Studi Lauretani, in collaboration with the Ancelle di Mater Misericordiae, hosted a devotional exhibition on Ronci's life in Loreto. A play about Ronci's life was due to be performed in Rimini's Church of San Martino di Bordonochio in February 2020, but was cancelled by the COVID-19 pandemic.
