= Ursulines =

Religious institutes of the Catholic Church

Order of Saint Ursula
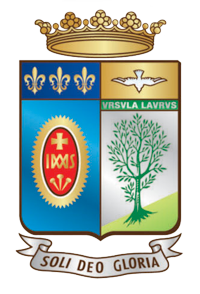
- Abbreviation: OSU
- Named after: Saint Ursula
- Predecessor: Angelines
- Established: 1572; 454 years ago
- Founder: Angela Merici
- Type: Enclosed religious order
- Prioress General: Susan Flood
- Affiliations: Catholic Church

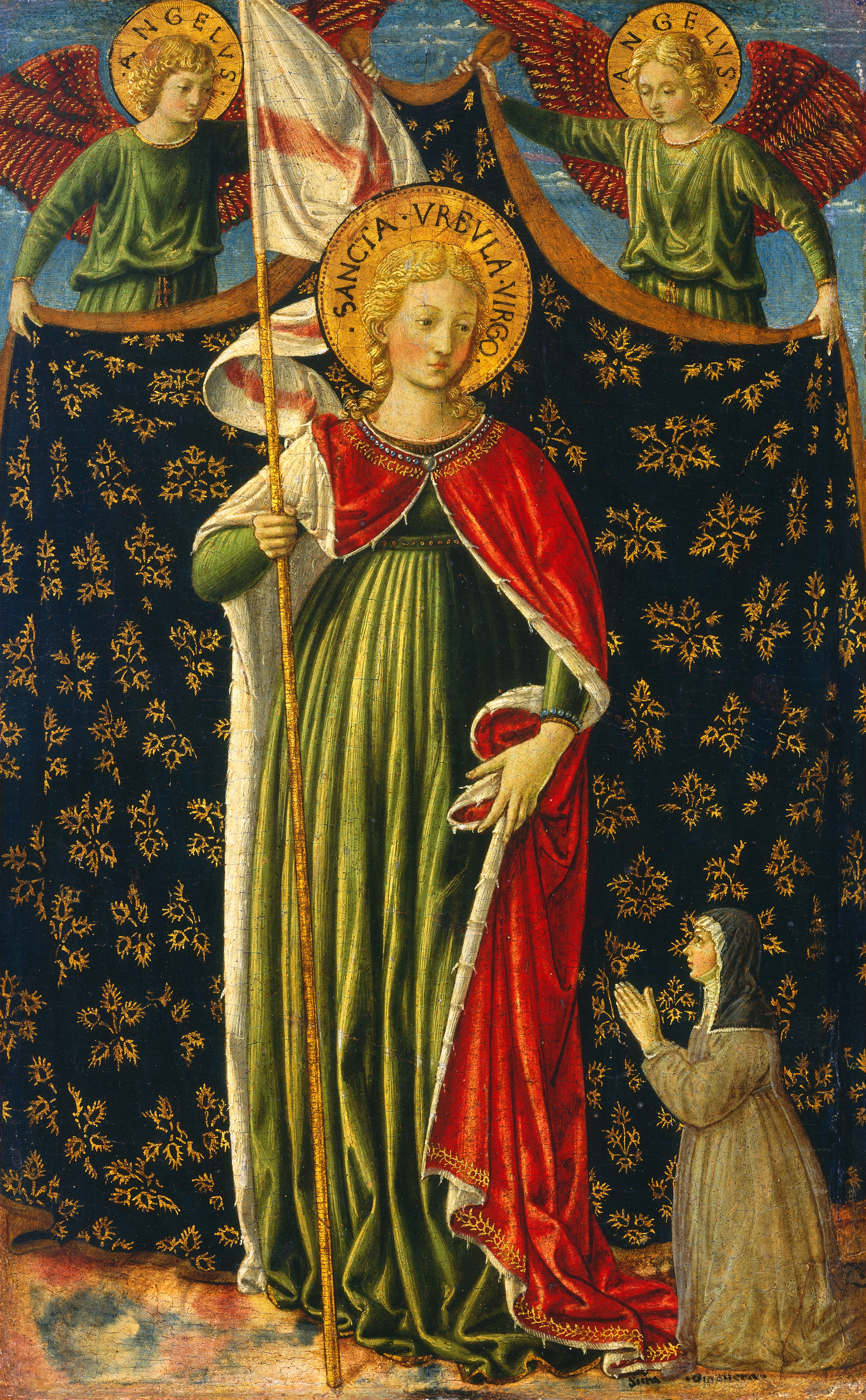
Saint Ursula, painted by Benozzo Gozzoli (c. 1455–1460)

The Ursulines, also known as the Order of Saint Ursula (post-nominals: OSU), is an enclosed religious order of women that in 1572 branched off from the Angelines, also known as the Company of Saint Ursula. The Ursulines trace their origins to the Angeline foundress Angela Merici and likewise place themselves under the patronage of Saint Ursula.

While the Ursulines took up a monastic way of life under the Rule of Saint Augustine, the Angelines operate as a secular institute. The largest group within the Ursulines is the Ursulines of the Roman Union.

== History ==
In 1572 in Milan, under Charles Borromeo, the Archbishop of Milan, members of the Company of Saint Ursula chose to become an enclosed religious order. Pope Gregory XIII placed them under the Rule of Saint Augustine. Especially in France, groups of the company began to re-shape themselves as cloistered nuns, under solemn vows, and dedicated to the education of girls within the walls of their monasteries.

In the following century, the Ursuline nuns were strongly encouraged and supported by Francis de Sales. They were called the "Ursuline nuns" as distinct from the "federated Ursulines" of the company, who preferred to follow the original way of life. Both forms of life continued to spread throughout Europe and beyond.

At the beginning of the 18th century, the period of its greatest growth, the order was represented by 20 congregations, 350 convents and from 15,000 to 20,000 nuns.

== Ursulines in North America ==
=== Canada ===
The Ursuline sisters were not the first Catholic nuns to land in the new world. They were preceded by the Hieronymites in 1585 in Mexico City, who established the convent of San Jerónimo y Santa Paula. In 1639, Mother Marie of the Incarnation, two other Ursuline nuns, three Augustinian sisters and a Jesuit priest left France for a mission in New France in what is now the Province of Quebec, Canada.

When they arrived in the summer of 1639, they studied the languages of the native peoples and then began to educate the native children. They taught reading and writing as well as needlework, embroidery, drawing, and other domestic arts. The Ursuline convent in Quebec City is the oldest educational institution for women in North America. Their work helped to preserve a religious spirit among the French population and to evangelize native peoples of New France.

=== United States ===
The first Ursulines arrived at Mobile, Alabama, in 1719, though information is contradictory from remaining and available sources. In 1727, 12 Ursulines from France landed in what is now New Orleans. The entire group of Ursulines were the first Roman Catholic nuns in what is now the United States. Both properties were part of the French colony of Louisiana (New France). They came to the country under the auspices of Pope Pius III and Louis XV of France. Following the Louisiana Purchase in 1803, their charter came under the jurisdiction of the United States.

They instituted a convent and school, both of which continue today. Ursuline Academy (New Orleans) is the oldest continually operating Catholic school in the United States and the oldest girls school in the United States. The Ursuline tradition holds many United States firsts in its dedication to the growth of individuals, including the first female pharmacist, first woman to contribute a book of literary merit, first convent, first free school and first retreat center for ladies, first classes for female slaves (which continued until abolition), free women of color (a unique New Orleans group also known as Creoles of Color) and Native Americans. In the Mississippi Valley region, Ursulines provided the first social welfare center.

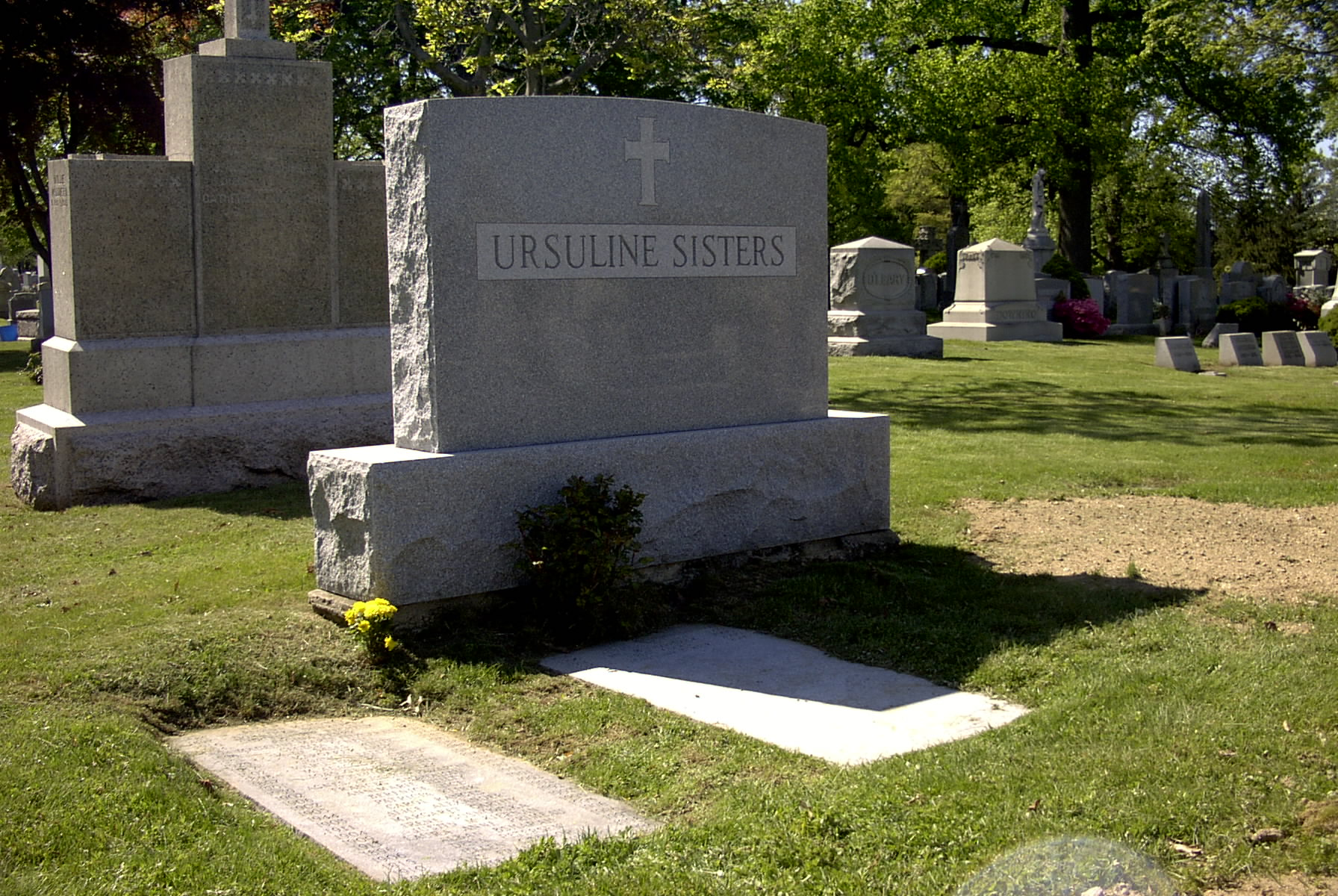
The tombstone of the Ursuline Sisters in Holy Sepulchre Cemetery (New Rochelle, New York)

The Old Ursuline Convent is located in the Vieux Carre, in New Orleans' French Quarter. The building now houses the Archdiocese of New Orleans' Archives as well as operating as a tourist attraction/ museum with public tours available almost daily. They had a well established presence as a hospital by the time of the US Revolutionary War. Ursuline sisters treated in the same building both British and United States soldiers wounded in the war. They may have been the first group of women propagating the ideals of diversity in a society, which flowed directly from the teachings of St Ursula and her followers.

Ursuline nuns, primarily from France and Germany, settled in other parts of North America including Boston (1820), Brown County, Ohio (1845), Cleveland (1850), San Antonio (1851), New York City (1855), Louisville (1858), Chatham, Ontario (1860), and Bruno (1916) and Prelate (1919) in Saskatchewan. These foundations spread to other parts of North America including Dallas (Ursuline Academy), Toledo, Youngstown, OH, Mount St. Joseph, Kentucky Santa Rosa (Ursuline High School), and Mexico City.

Mother Mary Baptista Aloysius Lynch was the founding superior of the Ursuline community in Columbia, South Carolina. During the Civil War, Lynch pled to General William T. Sherman, to protect the covenant from the destruction, but nonetheless, the Ursuline Convent was destroyed in the 1865 Burning of Columbia.

The members wore a habit consisting of a black dress bound by a leathern girdle, a black sleeveless cloak, and a close-fitting headdress with a white veil and a longer black veil. Since Vatican II they were no longer required to wear habits and today many opt out of wearing a habit.

Today the monastic Order of St. Ursula (post-nominals OSU) has as its largest group the Ursulines of the Roman Union (described in this article) which consists of Ursulines of the Eastern Province, Ursulines of the Central Province and Ursulines of the Western Province. The other branch is the Company of St. Ursula, commonly called the "Angelines", who follow the original form of life established by their foundress.

Ursuline Academy, Springfield, Illinois was founded in 1857 by Mother Mary Joseph Wolfe and operated from 1857 until 2007.

== Ursulines in Ireland ==
In 1767, Nano Nagle stayed with the Ursuline Sisters on Rue des Ursulines in Paris while visiting her cousin Margaret Butler who had made her vows just one year previously. In 1771, she established the first Ursuline convent in Ireland on Cove Lane in Cork. The community was made up of four Cork women – who made their vows at the Ursuline Convent in the Rue St. Jacques in Paris – together with a reverend mother. In 1825, the sisters and their boarding students relocated to Blackrock. The first Ursuline primary and second-level schools were founded at Blackrock.

At the request of James Butler, Archbishop of Cashel and Emly, Anastasia Tobin went to Cork to train as a religious. She made her vows at the Ursuline convent in September 1787, and returned to Thurles where she commenced teaching. Joined in 1796 by two others also trained at Cork, a small Ursuline community was founded at Thurles. In 1816, four sisters from Thurles established a community in Waterford. In 1932, Providence School was opened to serve the needs of the travelling community.

In 1839, George Joseph Plunket Browne, Bishop of Galway, brought the Ursuline Order of nuns to Dangan on the Oughterard road. In 1844, Browne was translated to the Diocese of Elphin. The Ursulines Order followed him to Elphin, first to Summerhill in Athlone and then to Sligo. He raffled his carriage to raise funds to compensate the sisters for the financial loss they suffered by removing to Sligo. There they took up residence at "Seaville", the former house of Bishop Burke, Browne's predecessor, and renamed it St. Joseph's Convent. Nazareth free primary school was built in 1851.

In 1952, the Ursulines established St. Angela's College, Sligo for the training of students and teachers in Home Economics, which became recognised college of the National University of Ireland in 1978, and since 2003 is a college of the National University of Ireland, Galway. In 2022, St Angela's College became a constituent college of Atlantic Technological University

The Irish Ursuline Union was established in 1978.

== Ursulines in Australia ==
=== New South Wales ===
- Armidale (Head House of the Ursuline Order in Australia)
- Tweed Heads
- Guyra
- Ashbury
- Kingsgrove

=== Queensland ===
- Dutton Park (first branch established in Queensland)
- Oxley
- Toowoomba

=== Victoria ===
- Macedon

=== Australian Capital Territory ===
- Canberra

== Role in education ==
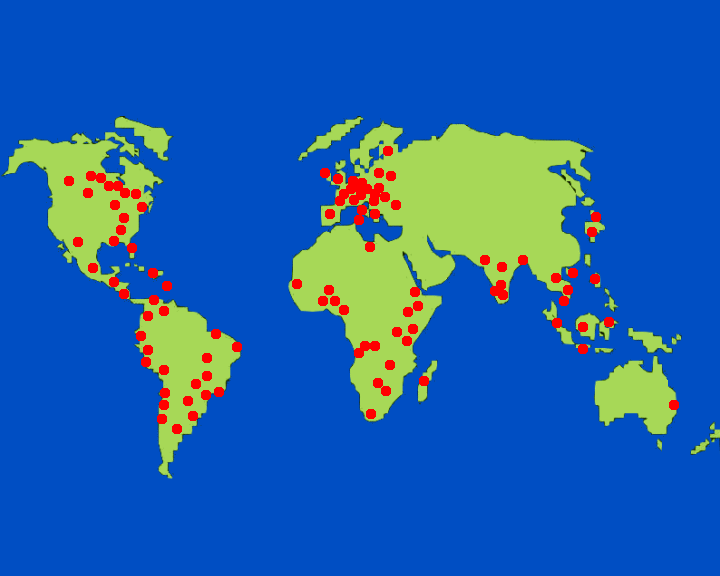
Ursuline works

=== Colleges and universities ===
In the United States, the Ursulines founded two well-known Catholic women's colleges. Ursuline College in Pepper Pike, Ohio, was founded in 1871 by the Ursuline Sisters of Cleveland. It was followed in 1904 by College of New Rochelle, now closed, but was located in New Rochelle, New York.

In 1919, the Ursulines founded a university-level liberal arts college for women in London, Ontario, Canada. Currently called Brescia University College (Brescia College at its foundation), it remains the only women-only university-level college in Canada and is affiliated with the University of Western Ontario.

From 1922 to 1975 the Mary Manse College in Toledo, Ohio, was operated by the Ursulines. It was a women's college until 1971, then was coeducational for its final four years.

In 1927, the Ursuline Sisters of the Eastern Province restructured Catholic education in Elkton, Maryland, by assisting in the founding of Immaculate Conception School, originally located at the corner of Cathedral Street and Singerly Avenue in historic Elkton, Maryland. The Ursulines ministered within the schoolhouse from 1927 to 1930, followed by the Sisters of the Third Order of St. Francis, Glen Ridde.

in 1931, The Ursulines established St. Ursula's College in Toowoomba alongside Downlands College which was established by the Missionaries of the Sacred Heart

In 1932, the Great Falls Junior College for Women was founded in Great Falls, Montana. Now the University of Providence, it has an open admission policy.

In 1921, the Ursuline Sisters of Louisville established Sacred Heart Junior College, which was expanded into a four-year college, Ursuline College, in 1938. Ursuline College merged with Bellarmine College in 1968, now Bellarmine University.

The Mount Saint Joseph Junior College for Women operated between 1925 and 1950 in Maple Mount, Kentucky, with the Ursulines offering co-educational extension courses at Owensboro. The Ursulines merged their extension courses with Mount Saint Joseph Junior College in 1950, creating the co-educational Brescia University that remains in operation.

In 1966, the Ursulines established in Taiwan what became the Wenzao Ursuline College of Languages.

From 1968 to 2003 the Ursuline Order operated Ursula College at the Australian National University in Canberra, Australia. It is a co-educational residential college for approximately 200 undergraduates. In 2003 the college was sold to the university and was renamed Ursula Hall. The Ursuline tradition has been retained in the Hall's high educational standards, retention of Ursuline symbols and livery, and the observance in October of Ursies Weekend for relaxing and socializing before November exams.

=== Secondary education ===
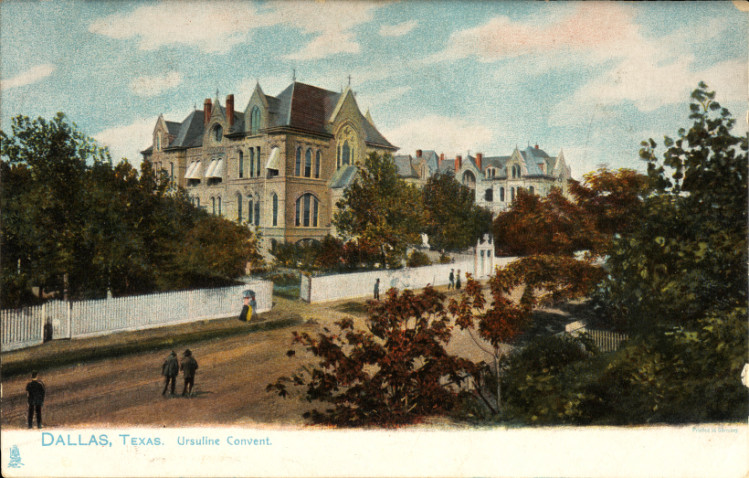
Ursuline Convent, Dallas, Texas, postcard, circa 1901–1907

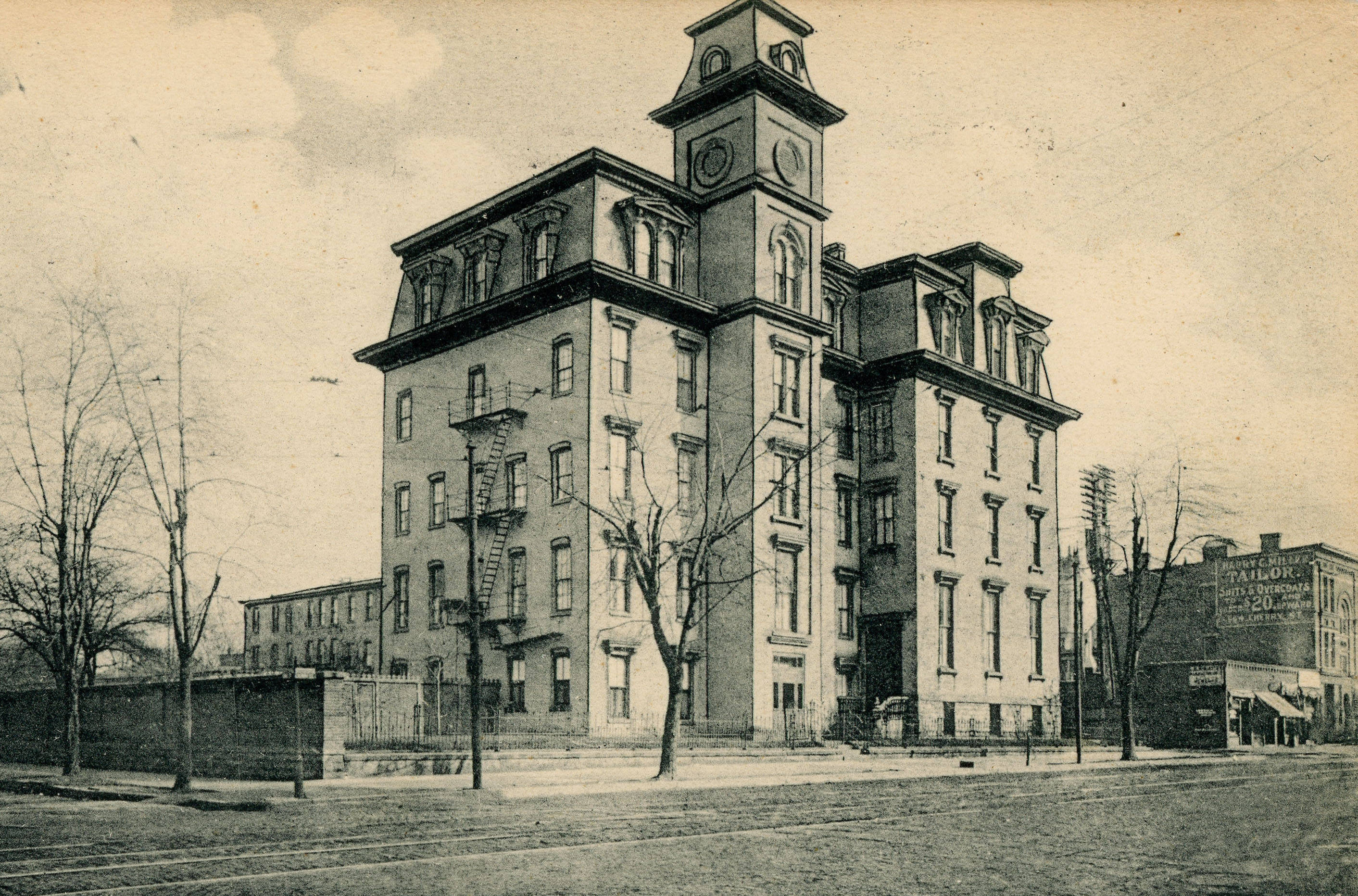
Ursuline Convent, Toledo, Ohio

Ursuline secondary education schools are found across the United States and other countries. The first school was Ursuline Academy, began in 1727 in New Orleans, Louisiana. It is the oldest all-girls school in the country. The Academy of Mount St. Ursula High School in the Bronx is the oldest all-girls Catholic high school in New York State, founded in 1855, the same year Sacred Heart Academy in Louisville, Kentucky, was founded.

In New York City, in 1873, James Boyce (1826–1876) invited the Ursuline nuns to found a girls' academy in St. Teresa's parish on Manhattan's Lower East Side. The new school, called St. Teresa's Ursuline Academy, located at 137 Henry Street, was incorporated in 1881. In 1891, it had a faculty of five sisters teaching 62 pupils.

In 1899, the Ursulines bought a two-story, wood-frame house farther uptown in Manhattan, at the northwest corner of Park Avenue and 93rd Street, converted the house to a school building, and changed the name of their school to simply "Ursuline Academy". In 1905, a news article announced plans for a twenty-four-foot wide, four-story seminary building to be built on the site to the design of architect Joseph H. McGuire.

The new building was constructed immediately to the west of Gen. Scott's old house, in its former garden. The order occupied both buildings until selling them in 1912, and moving the school to the Ursuline Provinculate at Grand Boulevard and 165th Street in the Bronx, New York. Both the house and school building were demolished for the construction of the Francis F. Palmer House beginning in 1916.

The Ursuline School in New Rochelle, New York, is a school for girls in grades 6-12 and is closely affiliated with the nearby Iona Preparatory School.

Other notable all-female Ursuline secondary schools in the United States include Ursuline Academy of Dallas, Texas, Ursuline Academy in Saint Louis, Missouri (founded in 1848), and Ursuline Academy in Wilmington, Delaware.

In the London Borough of Newham, United Kingdom, is the all-female girl school St. Angela's, named after the founder of the Ursulines. Only the sixth form centre of the school allows males. The same applies to the Ursuline High School in Wimbledon, which was selected as a Regional Winner - "London Secondary" in the Church School Awards 2011. Ursulines also have St Ursula's Convent School in Greenwich which educates girls aged 11 to 16 and coeducational Ursuline College, Westgate-on-Sea.

The British philosopher and author Celia Green has written extensively about her time at the Ursuline High School (now Ursuline Academy Ilford) in Ilford, London. Angela de Merici inspired the Ursuline Sisters to provide young women with an opportunity to achieve their full potential. Throughout their lives, students continue to remain part of the Ursuline community and continue to carry forward the legacy of Angela de Merici, by serving their society.

There is an Ursuline Convent in Pune, Maharashtra and Ranchi, Jharkhand, India.

In Thailand, the Ursulines established Mater Dei School in Bangkok in 1928. Its elite alumni include Kings Ananda Mahidol and Bhumibol Adulyadej. Although an all-girls school, it enrolled boys from Kindergarten through Primary 2.

Like their colleges, not all Ursuline secondary schools have remained single-sex. Villa Angela Academy, founded in 1878, in Cleveland, Ohio, merged with Marianist (Society of Mary) St. Joseph High School in 1990 forming the coed Villa Angela St. Joseph High School. The aforementioned Ursuline Academy in Delaware permits male students in grades 1–3, and Ursuline High School in Youngstown, Ohio, founded in 1905, is fully co-educational.

Other Ursuline secondary schools in the United States include Beaumont School in Cleveland Heights, Ohio (founded in 1850); Ursuline Academy in San Antonio, TX (founded 1851 - closed 1992); Ursuline Academy in Cincinnati, Ohio (founded in 1898); St. Ursula Academy in Cincinnati, Ohio; the Ursuline Academy of Dedham in Dedham, Massachusetts; Ursuline High School in Santa Rosa, California (founded in 1880); Ursuline Academy in Springfield, Illinois (founded 1857), which was coed from 1981 until it closed in 2007; and St. Joseph's Ursuline Academy in Malone, New York (closed in 1977 and was coed at least from the mid-1960s). There are Ursuline secondary schools in Ireland in Thurles, County Tipperary; Waterford, Blackrock, County Cork; and Sligo, Ireland, which have remained single sex.

== Saints, Blesseds, and other holy people from the Ursuline family ==
Saints

- Ursula of Cologne (fl. 4th century), virgin martyr and patron of the order
- Angela Merici (21 March 1474 – 27 January 1540), founder of the order, canonized on 24 May 1807
- Marie Guyart of the Incarnation (28 October 1599 – 30 April 1672), missionary to Canada, canonized on 3 April 2014
- Maria Ursula of Jesus (Julia Ledóchowska) (17 April 1865 – 29 May 1939), foundress of the Ursulines of the Agonizing Heart of Jesus, canonized on 18 May 2003

Blesseds

- Brigida of Jesus (Brigida Morello Zancano) (17 June 1610 – 3 September 1679), foundress of the Ursuline Sisters of Mary Immaculate, beatified on 15 March 1998
- Marie-Clotilde-Angèle Paillot and 10 Companions (died 17 October 1794), Martyrs of the French Revolution from Valenciennes, beatified on 13 June 1920
- Marie-Anne-Madeleine de Guilhermier and 15 Companions (died between 9 July to 26 July 1794), Martyrs of the French Revolution from Orange, beatified on 10 May 1925
- Caterina Cittadini (28 September 1801 – 5 May 1857), foundress of the Ursuline Sisters of Saint Jerome Emiliani, beatified on 29 April 2001
- Zefirino Agostini (24 September 1813 - 6 April 1896), priest of the Diocese of Verona and founder of the Pious Union of Sisters Devoted to Saint Angela Merici and the Ursuline Sisters of the Daughters of Mary Immaculate, beatified on 25 October 1998
- Blandine of the Sacred Heart (10 July 1883 – 18 May 1918), religious sister of the Ursuline Sisters of Calvarienberg, beatified on 1 November 1987
- Maria Klemensa Staszewska (30 July 1890 - 27 July 1943), religious sister of the Ursulines of the Roman Union martyred during the Second World War, beatified on 13 June 1999

Venerables

- Giovanna Meneghini (23 May 1868 - 2 March 1918), founder of the Ursulines of the Sacred Heart of Mary, declared venerable on 4 May 2017
- Maddalena Girelli (3 October 1838 - 17 March 1923), founder of the Secular Institute of the Company of Saint Ursula and Daughters of Saint Angela Merici of Brescia, declared venerable on 3 July 1998
- Angela Caterina (Maria Ignazia) Isacchi (8 May 1857 - 19 August 1934), founder of the Ursuline Sisters of the Sacred Heart of Jesus of Asola, declared venerable on 17 December 2022
- Anna Teresa Caterina (Maria Margherita) Lussana (14 November 1852 - 27 February 1935), cofounder of the Ursuline Sisters of the Sacred Heart of Jesus of Asola, declared venerable on 23 February 2023
- Maria Celine Kannanaikal (13 February 1931 - 26 July 1957), religious sister of the Ursuline Sisters of Mary Immaculate, declared venerable on 5 August 2022
- Maria Dositea Eucaristica (Maria Domenica Bottani) (31 May 1896 - 2 September 1970), religious sister of the Ursuline Sisters of the Immaculate Virgin Mary of Gandino, declared venerable on 25 November 2021

Servants of God

- Anne Gassiot and 3 Companions (died between 7 July and 25 July 1794), Martyrs of the French Revolution from Bordeaux
- Marie-Séraphine Pavie and 6 Companions (died between 26 April to 30 June 1794), Martyrs of the French Revolution from the Archdiocese of Cambrai
- Isidor Formosa (15 November 1851 - 19 January 1931), priest of the Archdiocese of Malta and founder of the Ursuline Sisters of Malta, declared as a Servant of God on 4 September 2002
- Marija Klaudija of the Immaculate Conception (Jerina Matilda Boellein) (17 January 1875 - 3 February 1952), religious sister of the Ursulines of the Roman Union
- Maria Agnes Shi Xianzhi (6 July 1913 - 28 December 1960), religious sister of the Ursuline Missionaries of the Sacred Heart martyred in China
- Maria Gesuina (Domenica) Seghezzi (12 February 1882 - 30 March 1963), religious sister of Ursuline Sisters of the Immaculate Virgin Mary of Gandino, declared as a Servant of God on 22 February 1991
- Erzsébet (Gabriella) Hajdú (8 January 1915 - 20 April 1963), religious sister from the Ursulines of the Roman Union martyred in Communist Hungary

== See also ==
- Congregation of the Ursulines of the Agonizing Heart of Jesus (Grey Ursulines)
- École des Ursulines, Quebec
- Dorothy Kazel
- Society of the Sisters of Saint Ursula of the Blessed Virgin
- Ursuline Convent Riots
- Ursulines of Quebec (includes Ursulines museum)
- Ursuline Sisters Daughters of Mary Immaculate
