= Sandra Sabattini =

Italian woman beatified by the Roman Catholic Church (1961 – 1984)

Blessed Sandra Sabattini
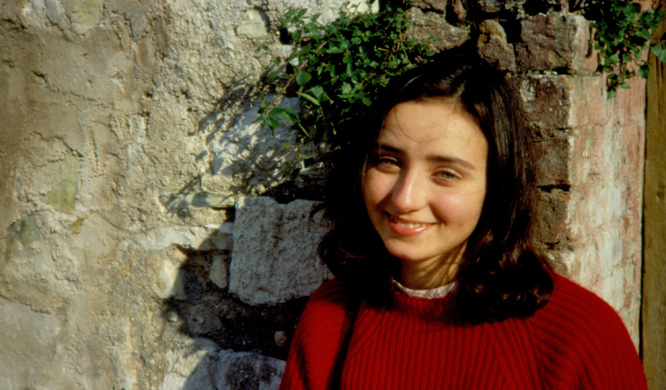
- Sabattini in 1984

Virgin
- Born: 19 August 1961; Riccione, Emilia-Romagna, Italy
- Died: 2 May 1984 (aged 22); Bologna, Emilia-Romagna, Italy
- Venerated in: Catholic Church
- Beatified: 24 October 2021, Tempio Malatestiano, Rimini, Italy by Cardinal Marcello Semeraro (on behalf of Pope Francis)
- Major shrine: San Girolamo, Rimini
- Feast: 4 May
- Major works: Sandra's Diary

Sandra Maria Assunta Sabattini (19 August 1961 – 2 May 1984) (Note: Sabattini was baptised as Sandra Maria Assunta. Some sources mistakenly refer to her as Alessandra as a result of the Latinisation of her Italian name as Alexandra in official church documents.) was an Italian diarist, medical student, and member of the Pope John XXIII Community, who was beatified by the Catholic Church on 24 October 2021.

Sabattini was raised in Rimini, living at the rectory of San Girolamo, whose parish priest was her maternal uncle. Aged 10, she began to keep a spiritual diary, which was posthumously published. As a young adult, Sabattini volunteered at a drug rehabilitation centre run by the Community, and pursued studies at the University of Bologna to become a missionary doctor.

On 29 April 1984, arriving at a Community meeting in Igea Marina with her fiancé, she was hit by an oncoming car and died of her injuries three days later. Oreste Benzi, chaplain and the community's founder, campaigned for her beatification. On 24 October 2021, Sabattini was beatified at Rimini's Tempio Malatestiano by Cardinal Marcello Smeraro on behalf of Pope Francis.

== Life ==
Sandra Sabattini was born on 19 August 1961 at the Ceccarini Hospital in Riccione, Province of Rimini, to Giuseppe Sabattini and his wife Agnese Bonini. She was the first of the couple’s two children. The family lived in the rectory of the church of Madre del Bell'Amore in Cella, in the comune of Misano Adriatico: Agnese's brother, Giuseppe Bonini, was a priest there. Sabattini was baptised in the church the day after her birth. On 1 October 1965, Giuseppe was appointed as parish priest of the newly-formed parish of San Girolamo in Rimini; the family followed Giuseppe to live in San Girolamo's rectory.

From a young age, Sandra was noted for her faith. She would pray early in the mornings and late in the evenings. She made her First Holy Communion on 3 May 1970. From 24 January 1972, aged 10, Sabattini began to keep a journal recording her spiritual reflections. She was confirmed on 16 April 1972. Aged 12, she met Oreste Benzi, a priest and founder of the Pope John XXIII Community, at a meeting organised by Bonini. In September 1974, Sabattini volunteered at a youth summer camp for disabled children in Canazei.

Sabattini met her fiancé, Guido Rossi, at a carnival party in February 1978. Rossi, who was two years her senior, was also a member of the Pope John XXIII Community. For their first date, she brought him to a cemetery to visit the graves of the forgotten. They became engaged in 1979.

Sabattini passed her high school diploma in 1980, and enrolled as a medical student at the University of Bologna, aspiring to become a missionary doctor in Africa. She achieved excellent marks in her exams.

On weekends and in the summer of 1982 and 1983, Sandra volunteered at a drug rehabilitation centre run by the Pope John XXIII Community. The centre was located in Trarivi, on the road between Rimini and Montescudo.

== Death ==
On 29 April 1984, Sabattini was due to attend a meeting of the community in Igea Marina. She arrived at 9.30am, accompanied by Rossi and a friend, Elio. Sabattini and Elio were hit by another vehicle as they left their car. Benzi accompanied Sabattini in the ambulance, holding her mouth open. She was admitted to the Bellaria Hospital in Bologna. After three days in coma, Sandra Sabattini died on 2 May 1984.

Sandra's funeral was celebrated on 5 May 1984, with a homily by Benzi. She was buried in the cemetery of the church of Sant'Andrea in Casale, in the comune of San Clemente, less than 4 kilometres (2.5 miles) from her childhood home in Cella.

== Beatification ==
Following her death, Benzi was prominent in promoting Sandra's cause for beatification. He noted that while many saints were spouses or parents, there was no "holy fiancée".

On 30 January 2006, the Bishops' Conference of Emilia-Romagna declared itself favourable to initiating proceedings for the cause of Sabattini's beatification. The Congregation for the Causes of Saints gave its assent on 11 July 2006. Thus, on 27 September 2006, Mariano De Nicolò, Bishop of Rimini, opened the cause for Sabattini's beatification. The diocesan investigation lasted until 6 December 2008, and examined around sixty testimonies. The postulator for the cause was Fausto Lanfranchi, a priest who was also postulator for the causes of Carla Ronci, and the vice-postulators were Oreste Benzi and Alberto Marvelli.

On 22 April 2009, as part of the canonisation process, Sandra's remains were exhumed from Sant'Andrea in Casale, after which it was expected that they would be moved to San Girolamo. The exhumation recovered only a pair of small plastic hospital socks and a strip of transparent plastic used to tie a bundle of flowers. This was because Sandra had asked for her body to be buried in the bare earth. Francesco Sambiasi, Bishop of Rimini, suggested that the sarcophagus which had been prepared nevertheless be installed empty in the church as a monument to Christ's resurrection.

On 18 June 2010, the Congregation for the Causes of Saints confirmed the validity of the diocesan investigation. On 6 March 2018, at an audience granted to Cardinal Angelo Amato, the Congregation's Prefect. Pope Francis declared Sandra Sabattini to be Venerable.

The miracle adduced in Sandra's beatification process concerned Stefano Vitali, Benzi's first secretary and later President of the Province of Rimini. On 19 July 2007, Vitali was rushed to Rimini's hospital with colon cancer. He was operated on the following day, with a prognosis of death within a few months. After praying for Sandra Sabattini's intercession, he was cured. A diocesan investigation into the miracle was opened in 2015; on 24 January 2019, the medical department of the Congregation for the Causes of Saints entered a favourable report. Thus, on 2 October 2019, Pope Francis confirmed the miracle's authenticity. Sabattini's beatification was scheduled for 14 June 2020 at Rimini Fiera, but was postponed by the coronavirus pandemic.

On 24 October 2021, Sandra Sabattini was beatified on Pope Francis' behalf at the Tempio Malatestiano, Rimini's cathedral, by Cardinal Marcello Semeraro, Prefect of the Congregation. In the procession, Vitali carried Sandra's only remaining mortal remains, a hairstrand kept by Rossi, her fiancé.

== Legacy ==
In 1985, Benzi published the first edition of Sandra Sabattini's journal, which was republished in 2003 with biographical notes. A biography in two volumes was edited by Laila Lucci, entitled La santa della porta accanto (The Saint Next Door) and Sandra Sabattini: Questa vita non è mia (Sandra Sabattini: This life is not mine).

In the Church of San Girolamo, Sandra is commemorated by the sarcophagus destined originally to contain her remains and by a bas-relief; at the church, there is also an exhibition depicting her life. Designed by Paola Ceccarelli, the bas-relief depicts Sandra smiling in the centre, holding a flower in one hand and a poor figure in the other. To convey her participation in the community, Benzi is depicted on one side of her, and her parents and uncle, Giuseppe Bonini, on the other. Ceccarelli also designed Sabattini's sarcophagus, whose floral motifs recall Sandra's dream of being buried in a tomb of flowers. The sarcophagus, realised by architect Francesco Baldi, is not fully closed, but has a pane of transparent glass allowing visitors to see some pieces of wood inside.

Sandra is also depicted in a mural in Rimini's Church of the Resurrection, where Benzi was the parish priest. A roundabout in Rimini's outskirts, near the same church, has been named after her; it lies south of the Ausa's crossing on Via della Grotta Rossa, the old road between Rimini and San Marino.

In those places for which Blessed Sandra's memorial has been approved by the Holy See, it is celebrated on 4 May.
