= Timeline of Rimini =

The following is a timeline of the history of the city of Rimini in the Emilia-Romagna region of Italy.

== Prior to 20th century ==
- 268 BCE – Ariminum becomes a Roman colony.
- 27 BCE – Arch of Augustus erected.
- 313 CE – Roman Catholic Diocese of Rimini established; Stemnio becomes bishop.
- 538 – Rimini besieged by Goth forces.
- 1157 – Rimini granted "right of self-government."
- 1216 – Rimini "worsted by Cesena."
- 1237 – Giovanni Malatesta becomes podesta.
- 1295 – Malatesta da Verucchio becomes Lord of Rimini.
- 1432 – Sigismondo Pandolfo Malatesta becomes lord of Rimini.
- 1450 – Tempio Malatestiano (church) built (approximate date).
- 1512 – Spaniards and the Swiss fought against the French at Ravenna.
- 1528
  - Pope Clement VII becomes definite master of the town.
  - End of 250 years of the rule over Rimini of the House of Malatesta.
- 1619 – Biblioteca Civica Gambalunga (library) founded.
- 1861 – Bologna–Ancona railway begins operating; Rimini railway station opens.
- 1882 – "Technical school" established.
- 1889 – Ferrovia Ferrara-Rimini (railway) begins operating.

== 20th century ==
- 1901 – Population: 46,801.
- 1912
  - Airport built.
  - Libertas Rimini football club formed.
- 1916 – Verucchio-Rimini railway begins operating.
- 1921 – Rimini-Riccione tram begins operating.
- 1932 – Ferrovia Rimini-San Marino railway begins operating.
- 1934 – Stadio Romeo Neri (stadium) opens.
- 1939 – Trolleybuses in Rimini begin operating.
- 1960 – 31 July: 1960 Deutsche Flugdienst incident.
- 1976 – October: National meeting of Lotta Continua held in Rimini.
- 1992 – TRAM (Rimini) (transit entity) formed.
- 1993 – Corriere Romagna newspaper begins publication.

== 21st century ==
- 2011 – Andrea Gnassi becomes mayor.
- 2013 – Population: 143,731.
- 2019 – Metromare (bus rapid transit) line opens

== See also ==
- History of Rimini
- List of mayors of Rimini
- List of lords of Rimini, 1295–1500 (in Italian)
- List of bishops of Rimini (in Italian)
- History of Romagna region

Timelines of other cities in the macroregion of Northeast Italy:^{(it)}

- Emilia-Romagna region: Timeline of Bologna; Ferrara; Forlì; Modena; Parma; Piacenza; Ravenna; Reggio Emilia
- Friuli-Venezia Giulia region: Timeline of Trieste
- Trentino-South Tyrol region: Timeline of Trento
- Veneto region: Timeline of Padua; Treviso; Venice; Verona; Vicenza

== Bibliography ==
=== in English ===
- William Smith, ed. (1872) [1854]. "Ariminum". Dictionary of Greek and Roman Geography. London: John Murray. hdl:2027/hvd.ah5cuq – via HathiTrust.
- "Rimini", Central Italy and Rome: Handbook for Travellers (15th ed.), Leipzig: Karl Baedeker, 1909, OCLC 423237
- Villari, Pasquale (1910). "Rimini" . Encyclopædia Britannica. Vol. 23 (11th ed.). pp. 344–347.
- Roy Domenico (2002). "Emilia Romagna: Rimini". Regions of Italy: a Reference Guide to History and Culture. Greenwood. pp. 101+. ISBN 0313307334.
- Christopher Kleinhenz, ed. (2004). "Rimini". Medieval Italy: an Encyclopedia. Routledge. p. 965. ISBN 0415939291.
- Charles M. Rosenberg, ed. (2010). Court Cities of Northern Italy: Milan, Parma, Piacenza, Mantua, Ferrara, Bologna, Urbino, Pesaro, and Rimini. Cambridge University Press. ISBN 978-0-521-79248-6.

=== in Italian ===
- "Rimini", Enciclopedia Italiana (Treccani) (in Italian), 1936
- Grazia Gobbi, Paolo Sica. Le città nella storia d'Italia. Rimini, Roma, Laterza, 1982.
- Stefano Pivato. Sentimenti e quotidianità in una provincia in guerra. Rimini, 1940-1944 (Rimini: Maggioli, 1995)
- Oriana Maroni, Maria Luisa Stoppioni. Storia di Rimini, Cesena, Il Ponte Vecchio, 1997.
