= Institute of the Maids of the Poor =

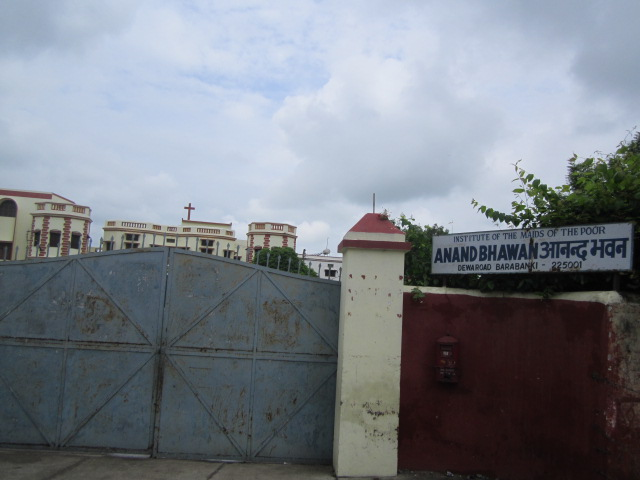
- Abbreviation: A.C.I. or A.C.J.
- Formation: 6 July 1951
- Type: Roman Catholic Secular Institute
- Headquarters: Anand Bhawan
- Location: Barabanki, India
- Coordinates: 23°56′06″N 81°11′06″E
- Directress General: Ms. Lily Fernandes
- Key people: Founder: Albert Conrad De Vito; Founding members: Anna Joseph, Mona Hosaiah, Getrude D’Costa and Mona Olive Foster; Constitution formulator: Pellegrino Ronchi
- Main organ: Roman Catholic Diocese of Lucknow
- Website: Institute of the Maids of the Poor
- Anand Bhawan School front view

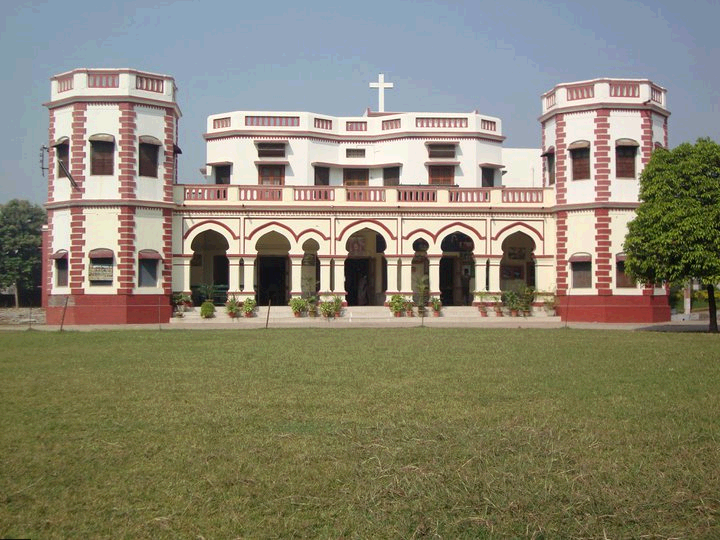
Anand Bhawan School front view.

The Institute of the Maids of the Poor or Society of the Maids of the Poor (MOP), is a Roman Catholic institute of consecrated life for women. It was founded by Albert Conrad De Vito, OFMCap, on 6 July 1951 in Barabanki, Uttar Pradesh, India.

== Formation ==
The institute is the first Roman Catholic Secular Institute in India. It was formed as 'Nursing and Teaching Society' by Anna Joseph, Mona Hosaiah, Getrude D’Costa and Mona Olive Foster on 6 July 1951 in a building in Barabanki. By 1960 the first constitutions were formulated with the help of Pellegrino Ronchi and were sent to Rome for approval. On 6 July 1962 the institute was canonically erected as a Secular Institute of Diocesan Right, Lucknow as the principal seat. The Institute became a Secular Institute of Pontifical Right on 4 October 2007.

== Activities ==
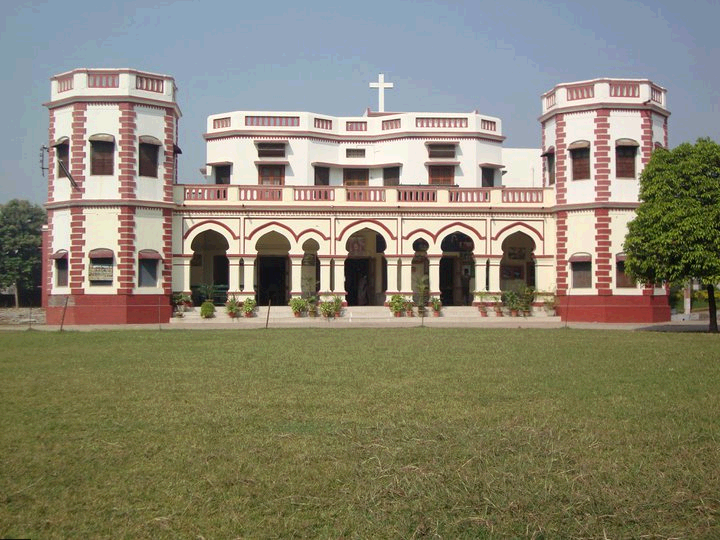
Anand Bhawan School, Barabanki, HQ of the Institute of the Maids of the Poor

=== India ===
The institute is located at Anand Bhawan, Dewa Road, Barabanki. It runs Anand Bhawan School in Barabanki and De Vito Shishu Vidyalaya at Bhowali. The Institute helps in the school boarding and pastoral activities at Poliganj an agricultural settlement in Majhola nagar panchayat of Pilibhit district. The Maids opened their convent in Nausar, Udham Singh Nagar district in 1980 to help the priest in educational and pastoral ministry weher they run a school named Nirmala Convent. The Maids also run hostel facility for girls at St. Joseph's P.U. College in Bajpe.

=== Abroad ===
Apart from India it is spread in Ethiopia, Italy and England. In Ethiopia, the Maids of the Poor arrived in the year 1975 and are involved in pastoral, medical and social activities.
