= Jamil Sadegholvaad =

Italian politician

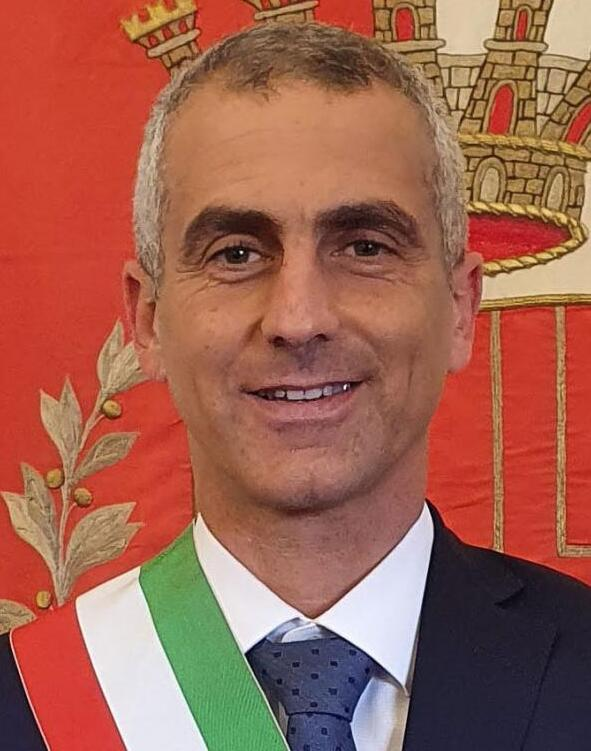

Mayor of Rimini
- Incumbent
- Assumed office 7 October 2021
- Preceded by: Andrea Gnassi

President of the Province of Rimini
- Incumbent
- Assumed office 25 November 2022
- Preceded by: Riziero Santi

Personal details
- Born: 14 June 1972 (age 54) Rimini, Italy
- Party: Democratic Party
- Education: University of Bologna

Jamil Sadegholvaad (born 14 June 1972) is an Italian politician, who has served as mayor of Rimini since 7 October 2021 and as president of the Province of Rimini since 25 November 2022.

== Life and career ==
Born to a mother from Coriano and an Iranian father, Sadegholvaad graduated in political science at the Forlì campus of the University of Bologna, alternating study with work in the Persian carpet shop opened by his parents.

Member of the Democratic Party since its foundation, he made his debut in politics as a provincial assessor for Industry in the executive led by Stefano Vitali from 2009 to 2011. Elected then municipal councilor at the 2011 municipal elections, he joined the government of mayor Andrea Gnassi as assessor for Security, a position he held for ten years from 2011 to 2021.

Ahead of the municipal elections of 2021, Sadegholvaad is chosen by his party as candidate for mayor, leading a centre-left coalition, being then elected in the first round with 51.32% of the votes and thus becoming the first mayor of an Italian capoluogo of foreign origin.

In November 2022, he was elected president of the Province of Rimini.

Political offices
Preceded by Andrea Gnassi	Mayor of Rimini; 2021–present	Incumbent
Preceded by Riziero Santi	President of the Province of Rimini; 2022–present	Incumbent
