= List of mayors of Rimini =

Mayor of Rimini
- Sindaco di Rimini

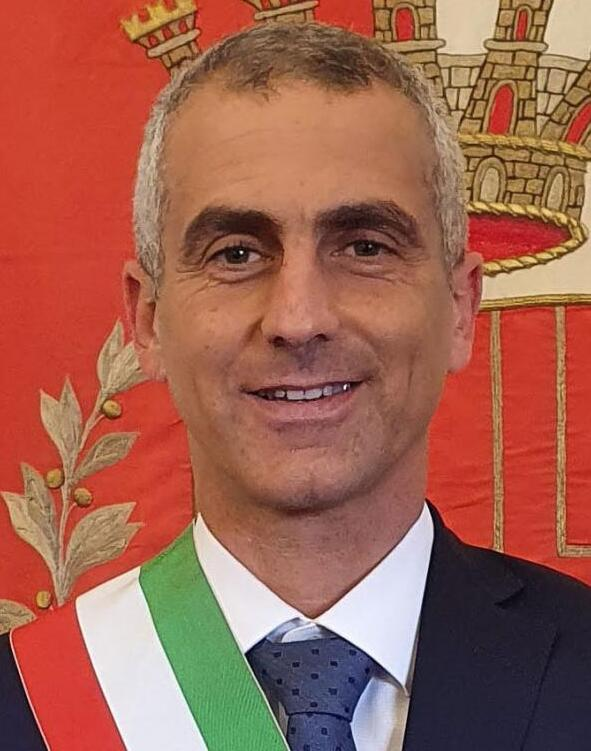
- Incumbent; Jamil Sadegholvaad (PD) since 7 October 2021
- Appointer: Popular election
- Term length: 5 years, renewable once
- Formation: 1860
- Website: Official website

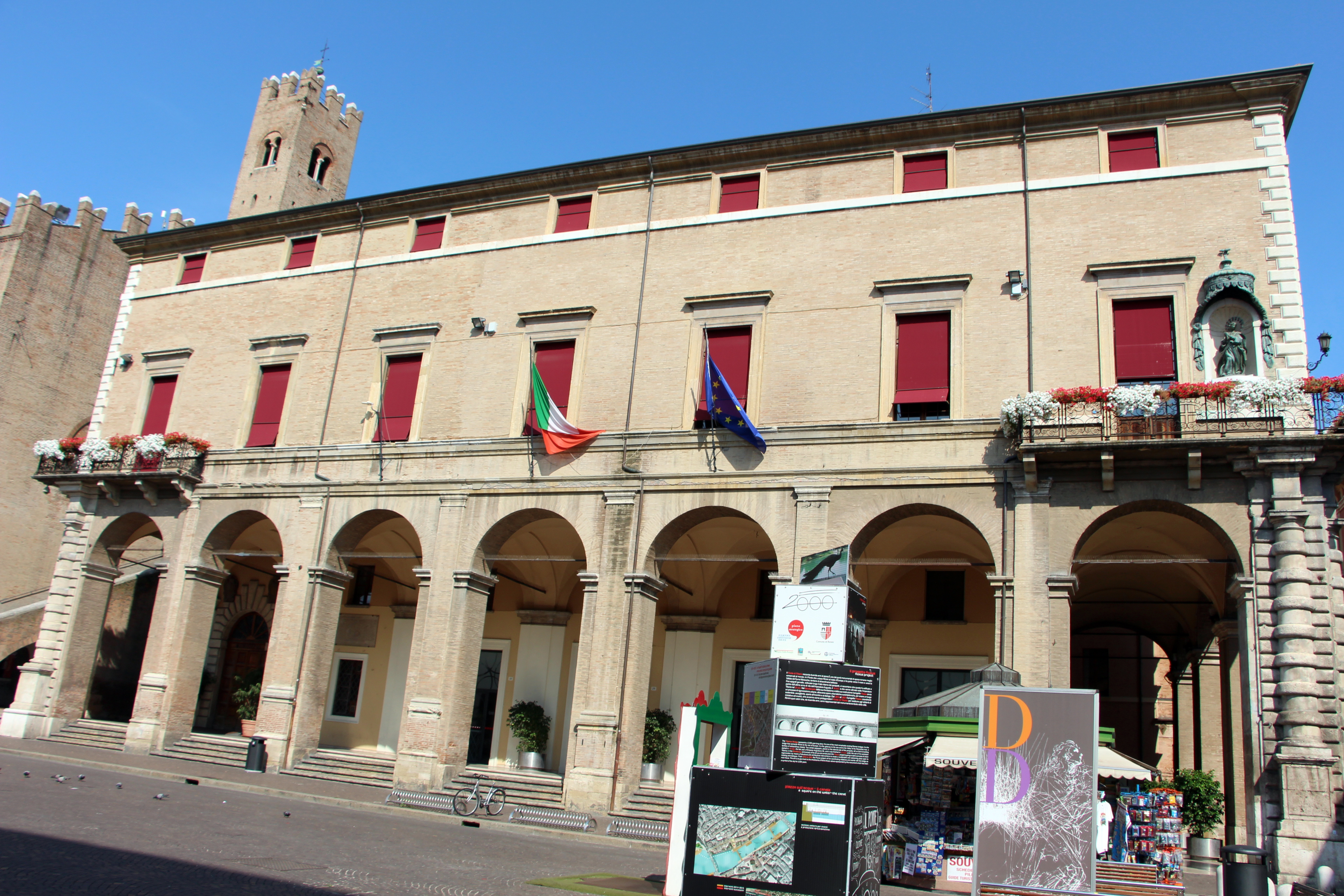
Palazzo Garampi is Rimini's City Hall

The mayor of Rimini is an elected politician who, along with the Rimini's city council, is accountable for the strategic government of Rimini in Emilia-Romagna, Italy.

The current mayor is Jamil Sadegholvaad, a member of the Democratic Party, who took office on 7 October 2021.

== Overview ==
According to the Italian Constitution, the mayor of Rimini is member of the city council.

The mayor is elected by the population of Rimini, who also elect the members of the city council, controlling the mayor's policy guidelines and is able to enforce his resignation by a motion of no confidence. The mayor is entitled to appoint and release the members of his government.

Since 1995 the mayor is elected directly by Rimini's electorate: in all mayoral elections in Italy in cities with a population higher than 15,000 the voters express a direct choice for the mayor or an indirect choice voting for the party of the candidate's coalition. If no candidate receives at least 50% of votes, the top two candidates go to a second round after two weeks. The election of the City Council is based on a direct choice for the candidate with a preference vote: the candidate with the majority of the preferences is elected. The number of the seats for each party is determined proportionally.

== Republic of Italy (since 1946) ==
=== City Council election (1946–1995) ===
From 1946 to 1995, the mayor of Rimini was elected by the City Council.

	Mayor	Term start	Term end	Party
1	Cesare Bianchini	1946	1948	PCI
2	Walter Ceccaroni	1948	1954	PCI
Special Prefectural Commissioner tenure (1954–1957)
3	Veniero Accreman	1957	1958	PCI
(2)	Walter Ceccaroni	1958	1970	PCI
4	Nicola Pagliarani	1970	1978	PCI
5	Zeno Zaffagnini	1978	1983	PCI
6	Massimo Conti	1983	1990	PSI
7	Marco Moretti	1990	1992	PSI
8	Giuseppe Chicchi	1992	1993	PDS
(7)	Marco Moretti	1993	1993	PSI
(8)	Giuseppe Chicchi	1993	1995	PDS

=== Direct election (since 1995) ===
Since 1995, under provisions of new local administration law, the Mayor of Rimini is chosen by direct election, originally every four, and since 2001 every five years.

	Mayor	Took office	Left office	Party	Coalition	Election
(8)	Giuseppe Chicchi (b. 1944)	9 May 1995	29 June 1999	PDS	PDS • PdD • FdV	1995
9	Alberto Ravaioli (b. 1945)	29 June 1999	11 January 2001 (Note: Election declared void by the Supreme Court of Cassation. The deputy mayor Maurizio Mellucci (DS) held the office till a new municipal election was held.)	DL; PD	The Olive Tree (DS-PPI-RI-PdCI-FdV)	1999
9	Alberto Ravaioli (b. 1945)	28 May 2001	30 May 2006	DL; PD	The Olive Tree (DS-DL-FdV)	2001
9	Alberto Ravaioli (b. 1945)	30 May 2006	31 May 2011	DL; PD	The Olive Tree (DS-DL-IdV-PRC-FdV)	2006
10	Andrea Gnassi (b. 1969)	31 May 2011	8 June 2016	PD	PD • IdV • FdS and leftist lists	2011
10	Andrea Gnassi (b. 1969)	8 June 2016	7 October 2021	PD	PD and leftist lists	2016
11	Jamil Sadegholvaad (b. 1972)	7 October 2021 (Note: Election originally scheduled for June 2021 then postponed due to the coronavirus pandemic.)	Incumbent	PD	PD • SI • A and leftist lists	2021

== See also ==
- Timeline of Rimini

== Bibliography ==
- Giovanni Rimondini (2015). Più bella e più grande di prima. Panozzo Editore.
