= Angelines =

Secular institute in the Catholic Church

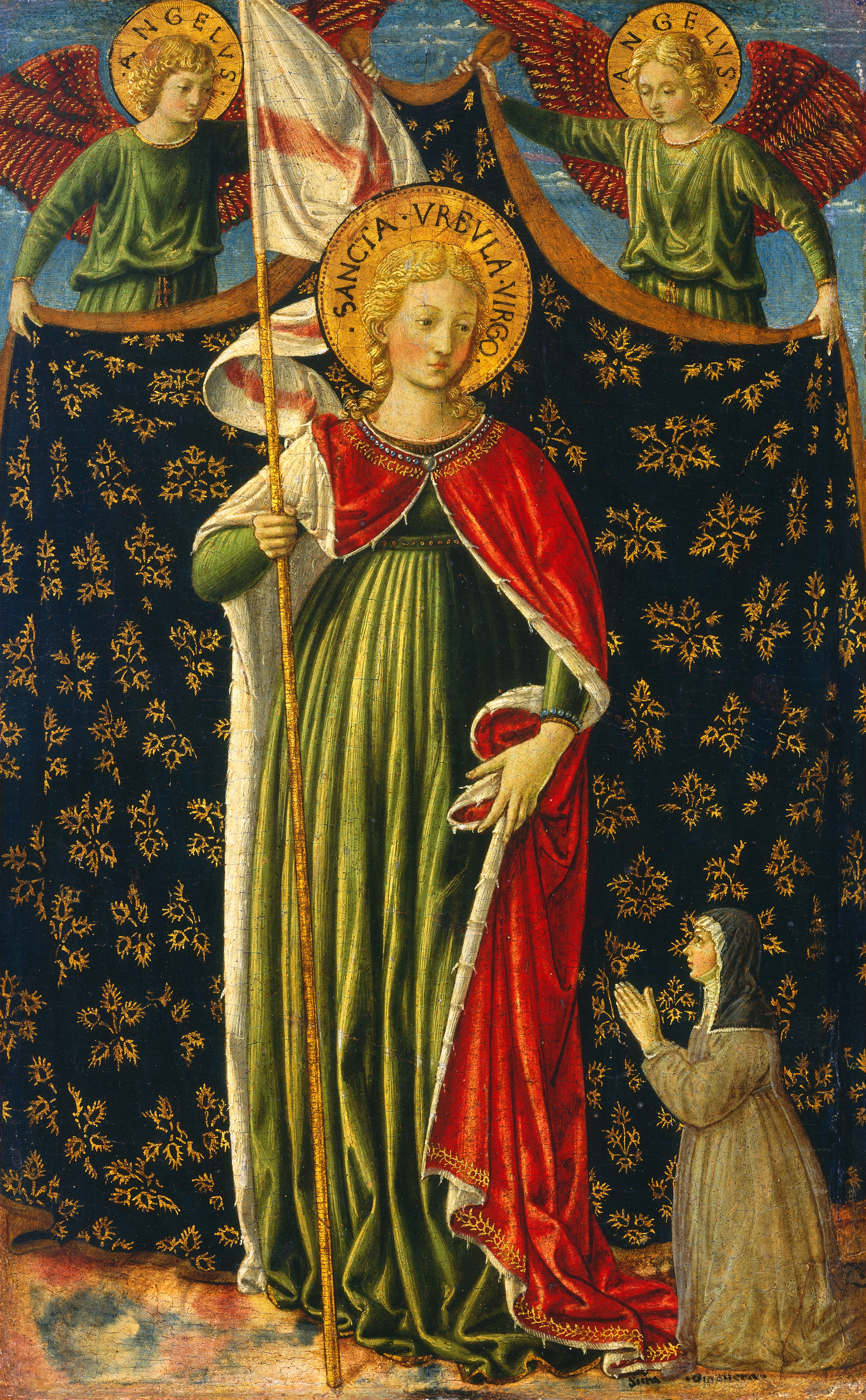

The Angelines, also known as the Company of Saint Ursula or officially the Secular Institute of Saint Angela Merici, is a secular institute of consecrated women in the Catholic Church founded in 1535 by Angela Merici (ca. 1474-1540) in Brescia, Italy. Their primary focus is the education of women and girls, and the care of the sick and needy. Their patron saint is Saint Ursula. They follow the original form of life established by their foundress in that they live independently, responsible for their own well-being, for which they often have secular jobs, but they formally dedicate their lives to the service of the church. In 1572, some members formed a separate monastic order, the Ursulines.

== History ==
Angela Merici was a member of the Third Order of St. Francis. According to the account of the history of the company, she experienced a call from God to found a community to share this way of life. Among the group of men and women who formed around her due to her spiritual leadership, she soon selected 28 women who wished to commit their lives in this endeavor.

These women, along with Merici, made a commitment of their lives on 25 November 1535, the feast day of St. Catherine of Alexandria, a major female spiritual figure in the Middle Ages. They called themselves the Company of St. Ursula, taking as their patroness the medieval patron saint of education. Continuing to live in their family homes, they would meet regularly for conferences and prayer in common. Merici drew up a rule of life for them. They were to live among the people they served without any distinguishing feature such as a religious habit, and would live outside a cloister. They would meet periodically and to assist at Holy Mass monthly. They also observed the evangelical counsels but did not take vows.

The company grew rapidly, being joined by women from throughout the city. The increasing number of members came to be organized in groups, according to the parish in which they lived, each of them called a company. The group then spread throughout the Diocese of Brescia. One of the early works of the new company was to give religious instruction to the girls of the town at the parish church each Sunday, which was an innovation for the period, having traditionally been left to the local parish priest. Companies soon developed in other dioceses in the region.

In 1538 the company had grown to such an extent that they held their first General Chapter. At this gathering, Merici was elected "Mother" of the company for life. The following year, as her health began to fail, she dictated her Testament and a book of Counsels to regulate the life of the group. She died in 1540.

The company was formally recognized in 1546 by Pope Paul III.

In 1572 in Milan, under Charles Borromeo, the Cardinal Archbishop of Milan, the members of the company there became an enclosed religious order. Pope Gregory XIII placed them under the Rule of St. Augustine. Especially in France, groups of the company began to re-shape themselves into communities of cloistered nuns under solemn vows, and dedicated to the education of girls within the walls of their monasteries.

=== Expansion ===
Communities of the company continued to exist and flourish, especially in Italy. In 1810, however, like other religious groups, they were suppressed after the invasion of Italy by the forces of the Napoleonic Empire. Two sisters who had belonged to the company, Elisabetta and Maddalena Girelli, reconstituted the company in Brescia in 1866. Once again, companies began to spread throughout Italy. Legally independent from one another, discussions took place which led to the creation of a Federation of Companies.

By the 20th century, Companies again began to be established outside of Italy. In 1947 the Catholic Church, under Pope Pius XII, recognized the growing strength of lay Catholic spirituality and created a category of secular institute in canon law to provide committed groups of lay people some formal status. The Angelines were established by the Holy See on 25 May 1958 as the Secular Institute of Saint Angela Merici.

Further expansion of the company has continued until today Companies of Angelines are present in 23 countries worldwide. Among the most recent foundations has been one in the United States in 2000, whose members were mentored by the Angelines of Canada and were officially incorporated into the Federation in 2006. Since 2010 a company has been established in Australia under the guidance of the company in France, which is also mentoring Companies in Cameroon, the Democratic Republic of Congo and Singapore.
