= Ferdinando Fabbri =

Italian politician (born 1954)

President of the Province of Rimini
- In office 13 June 1999 – 21 June 2009
- Preceded by: Ermanno Vichi
- Succeeded by: Stefano Vitali

Member of the Legislative Assembly of Emilia-Romagna
- In office 9 May 1995 – 3 March 2000

Mayor of Bellaria-Igea Marina
- In office 7 August 1985 – 24 April 1995
- Preceded by: Pietro Baldassarri
- Succeeded by: Italo Lazzerini

Personal details
- Born: 31 December 1954 (age 71) San Mauro Pascoli, Province of Forlì, Italy
- Party: Italian Communist Party; Democratic Party of the Left; Democrats of the Left; Democratic Party

Ferdinando Fabbri (born 31 December 1954) is an Italian politician who served as president of the Province of Rimini from 1999 to 2009 and as mayor of Bellaria-Igea Marina from 1985 to 1995. A member of the Democratic Party, he also served as a member of the Legislative Assembly of Emilia-Romagna.
