= Ermanno Vichi =

Italian politician (1942–2024)

President of the Province of Rimini
- In office 23 April 1995 – 12 June 1999
- Preceded by: Office established
- Succeeded by: Ferdinando Fabbri

Member of the Chamber of Deputies
- In office 28 April 2006 – 28 April 2008
- Constituency: Emilia-Romagna

Personal details
- Born: 18 March 1942 Novafeltria, Italy
- Died: 2 July 2024 (aged 82) Rimini, Italy
- Party: DC (1975-1994); PPI (1994-2002); DL (2002-2007); PD (2007-2024)
- Education: University of Bologna
- Profession: Teacher

Ermanno Vichi (18 March 1942 – 2 July 2024) was an Italian politician who served as deputy for one legislature (2006–2008).

Vichi died on 2 July 2024, at the age of 82.
