= Stefano Vitali =

Italian politician (born 1967)

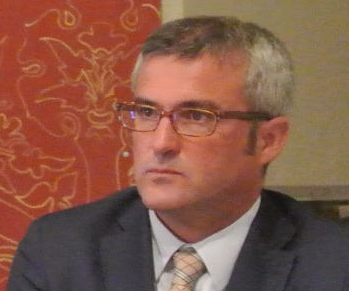
- Vitali in 2013

President of the Province of Rimini
- In office 23 June 2009 – 13 October 2014
- Preceded by: Ferdinando Fabbri
- Succeeded by: Andrea Gnassi

Personal details
- Born: 9 June 1967 (age 59) Rimini, Province of Forlì, Italy
- Party: Democratic Party

Stefano Vitali (born 9 June 1967) is an Italian politician who served as president of the Province of Rimini from 2009 to 2014.

Vitali began his public engagement through volunteer work and served as secretary to Oreste Benzi, founder of the Pope John XXIII Community Association, from 1994 to 1999. He was also an assessor of the Rimini for ten years.

In June 2009, he was elected president of the Province of Rimini for the centre-left coalition, defeating Marco Lombardi in the runoff. He left politics in 2014 and subsequently worked on the international activities of the Pope John XXIII Community.
