= Riziero Santi =

Italian politician (born 1957)

President of the Province of Rimini
- In office 31 October 2018 – 25 November 2022
- Preceded by: Andrea Gnassi
- Succeeded by: Jamil Sadegholvaad

Personal details
- Born: 22 April 1957 (age 69) Gemmano, Province of Forlì-Cesena, Italy
- Party: Democratic Party of the Left; Democrats of the Left; Democratic Party

Riziero Santi (born 22 April 1957) is an Italian politician who served as president of the Province of Rimini from 2018 to 2022.

== Life and career ==
Santi worked for the Municipality of Riccione and, from 1981 to 1991, was active in the trade union movement, serving as secretary of the Riccione Chamber of Labour from 1989 to 1991.

In 1991, he became municipal secretary of the Democratic Party of the Left in Riccione, and from 2001 to 2008 served as provincial secretary of the Democrats of the Left (DS).

Santi was elected to the first Provincial Council of Rimini in 2005 with the DS. In 2013, he was elected mayor of Gemmano as the candidate of a centre-left coalition, and was re-elected in 2018. In October 2018, Santi was elected president of the Province of Rimini, defeating Domenica Spinelli, the centre-right candidate, by 50.2% against 49.8%.

In 2023, he was elected mayor of Gemmano for a third consecutive term with 73% of the votes.
