= Zefirino Agostini =

Italian Roman Catholic priest (1813–1896)

Blessed Zefirino Agostini
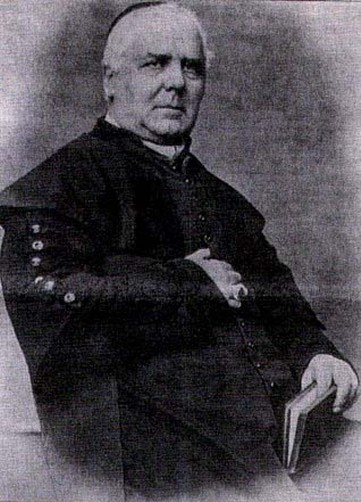

Priest
- Born: 24 September 1813; Verona, Napoleonic Kingdom of Italy
- Died: 6 April 1896 (aged 82); Verona, Kingdom of Italy
- Venerated in: Roman Catholic Church
- Beatified: 25 October 1998, Saint Peter's Square, Vatican City by Pope John Paul II
- Feast: 6 April
- Attributes: Cassock; Breviary
- Patronage: Pious Union of Sisters Devoted to Saint Angela Merici; Ursuline Sisters of the Daughters of Mary Immaculate

Zefirino Agostini (24 September 1813 - 6 April 1896) was an Italian Roman Catholic priest that served in his hometown of Verona to perform his pastoral duties. He established two religious congregations in his lifetime being the Pious Union of Sisters Devoted to Saint Angela Merici and the Ursuline Sisters of the Daughters of Mary Immaculate.

Agostini was beatified on 25 October 1998.

== Life ==
Zefirino Agostini was born in Verona on 24 September 1813 as the oldest son to Antonio Agostini and Angela Frattini. His father died before he reached age one which prompted his mother to care for him and his brothers. He spent his childhood with his paternal grandparents in Terrossa where he learned to read and write.

Agostini commenced his studies for the priesthood at the age of eighteen. One of his teachers during his time there was Venerable Nicola Mazza. He received his ordination on 11 March 1837 from the Bishop of Verona Giuseppe Grasser. Agostini was appointed in 1845 as the pastor of the parish of Santi Nazario e Celso and took possession of that parish upon his entrance on 29 June 1845. He had been there as a parish priest since 1837 but was elevated as its pastor.

He established a range of after-school care programs for girls and also catered for women's religious instruction in his parish. In 1852 he tried to open a centre for adolescents under the care of the Canossians but it didn't quite work so he tried to look into female oratories as a possible alternative. Agostini also instilled devotion to Saint Angela Merici among his female parishioners and even established a religious congregation devoted to her. The Rule for that order - the Pious Union of Sisters Devoted to Saint Angela Merici - received diocesan approval from the Bishop of Verona Benedetto Riccabona de Reinchenfels in 1856.

On 2 November 1856 the priest opened his first school for poor girls. In 1860 some of the workers from that school wanted to form a religious congregation under his direction so he prepared a Rule for them. It resulted in twelve females being professed on 24 September 1869 leading to the establishment of his Ursuline religious institute on 18 November 1869.

Zefirino Agostini died on 6 April 1868. His order received diocesan approval from Giordano Corsini on 24 June 1923 while the papal decree of praise of Pope Pius XI was issued on 14 March 1932 and full papal approval for the institute came on 3 April 1940 from Pope Pius XII during World War II. The order now operates in places such as Switzerland and Benin and as of 2005 has 628 religious in 78 houses.

== Beatification ==
The beatification process commenced on a diocesan level in 1964 - during the pontificate of Pope Paul VI - in which the late priest was granted the title Servant of God as the first stage in the process. The conclusion of the process around the time of the 1980s saw the Congregation for the Causes of Saints validate the process and approve the fact that it had done what it was tasked to do - collating evidence etc.

Historians first needed to assess whether or not there would be obstacles to the cause. The team deemed there were done and so approved the cause to proceed to the next stage on 17 April 1985. The decision allowed for the postulation to submit the Positio to the C.C.S. for further assessment and this in turn led to Pope John Paul II declaring Agostini to be Venerable on 22 January 1991 after ascertaining that he had lived a life of heroic virtue.

The miracle required for beatification was investigated in the place that it had occurred in and the ensuring process was ratified in Rome in mid 1987. John Paul II approved it on 6 April 1998 and beatified Agostini on the following 25 October in Saint Peter's Square.
