= Albert Conrad De Vito =

Italian Capuchin friar from (1946–1970)

Albert Conrad De Vito OFMCap
- Bishop of Lucknow
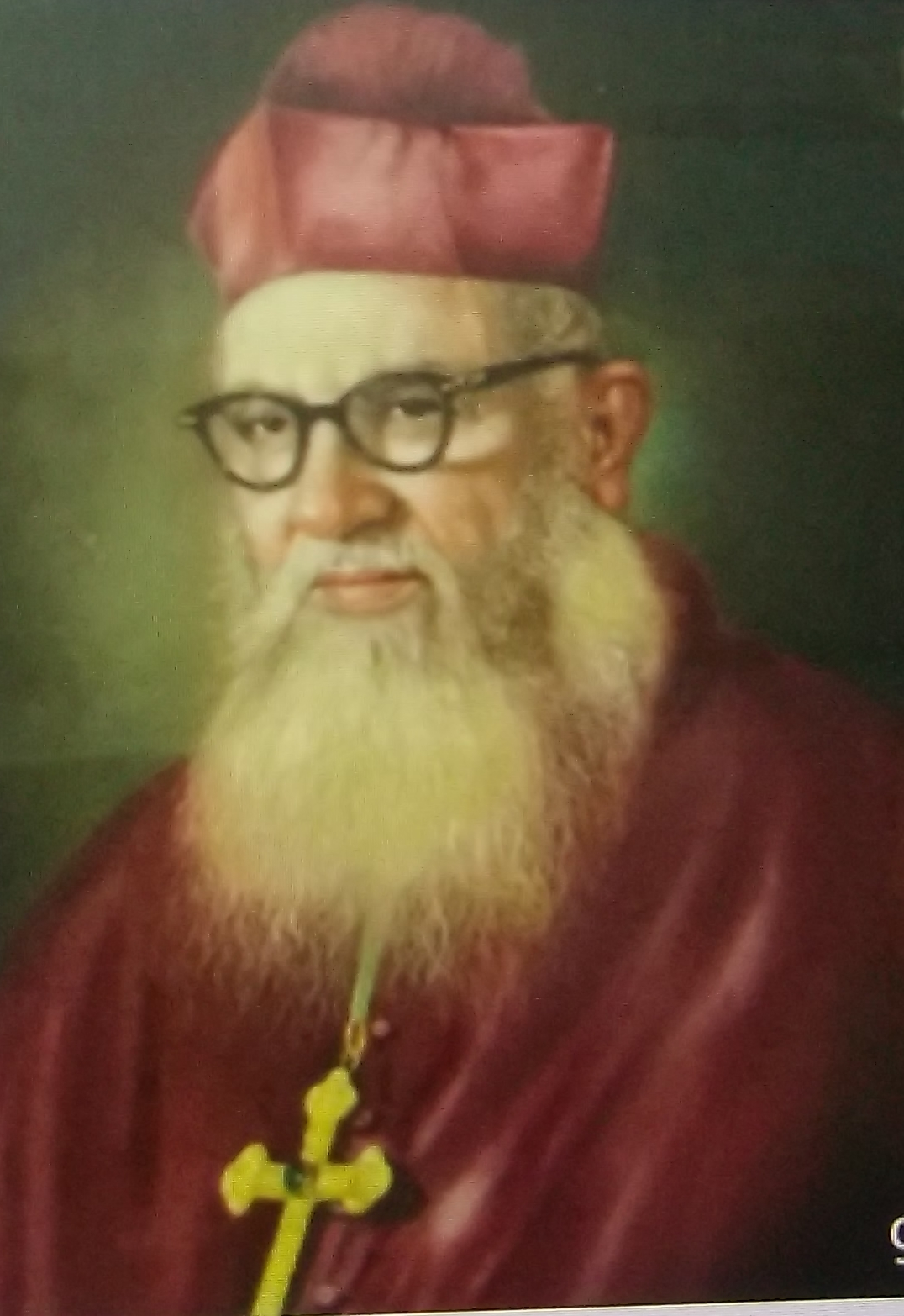
- Church: Catholic Church
- Diocese: Diocese of Lucknow
- In office: 12 December 1946 – 16 November 1970
- Predecessor: Diocese erected
- Successor: Cecil DeSa

Orders
- Ordination: 11 June 1927
- Consecration: 16 February 1947 by Leo Peter Kierkels

Personal details
- Born: 21 March 1904 Provvidenti, Province of Campobasso, Kingdom of Italy
- Died: 16 November 1970 (aged 66) Bologna, Emilia-Romagna, Italy
- Buried: St. Joseph's Cathedral, Lucknow

Albert Conrad De Vito, OFMCap was an Italian Capuchin friar, who was installed as the first Bishop of Lucknow in December 1946.

== Birth ==
De Vito was born in Provvidenti in 1904 to Raffaele and Maria Felice Cinelli.

== Life ==
On 20 January 1942, he was appointed the Parish Priest of St. Joseph's Church of Lucknow. He was appointed first Bishop of the new Diocese of Lucknow on 12 December 1946. he was consecrated on 16 February 1947, the governor of U.P., Sir Francis Wylie extended full support and also attended the consecration and played an important role in the festivities that followed. He remained Bishop of Lucknow until 16 November 1970.

In early 1950, Bishop Conrad expressed deep concern for primary education. He founded Anand Bhawan School and Institute of the Maids of the Poor in Barabanki city. He also founded four orphanages, 38 schools, three hospitals and about 20 clinics and a university.

When he came back to Bologna he founded the Casa della formazione for young people who didn't have a stable future. Many Indian Schools are established in his name as "Bishop Conrad School". One of this school is in Bareilly as well.

De Vito died in 1970 in Bologna. Seven years after his death, Indira Gandhi, the then Prime Minister of India, requested and obtained permission for his remains to be laid to rest in the Cathedral of St. Joseph at Lucknow which he himself had promoted.

== Books ==
He wrote the following books:

- Pope Paul VI: glimpses of his life before he became Pope
- Art at the service of faith: art, painting, architecture, symbols, local customs, music, and dance at the service of the church, as visualized by the Fathers of the II Vatican Ecumenical Council outside the Council Hall
- The Second Vatican Council at a Glance: Summary of the Documents of the Second Vatican Council
- Spiritual Life Made Easy
- Pastoral Hints
