= Brigida Morello Zancano =

Blessed Brigida Morello Zancano
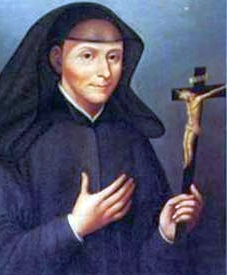
- Blessed Brigida of Jesus Morello

Religious
- Born: 17 June 1610; San Michele di Pagana, Genoa, Kingdom of Sardinia
- Died: 3 September 1679 (aged 69); Piacenza, Kingdom of Sardinia
- Venerated in: Roman Catholic Church
- Beatified: 15 March 1998, Saint Peter's Square, Vatican City by Pope John Paul II
- Feast: 3 September
- Attributes: Religious habit; Crucifix
- Patronage: Ursuline Sisters of Mary Immaculate; Widows

Brigida Morello Zancano (17 June 1610 – 3 September 1679), born Brigida Morello, was an Italian Roman Catholic widow and later a nun of the Ursuline Sisters of Mary Immaculate that she herself had established in her widowhood. She would assume the name of "Brigida of Jesus" when she founded her congregation.

On 15 March 1998 she was beatified and granted the title of Blessed. One miracle received approval from Pope John Paul II in order for her to be beatified and another must be found for her to be canonized. She is the patron for widows and for her order.

== Life ==
Brigida Morello was born on 17 March 1610 in Genoa as the sixth of eleven children to Nicolò Morello and Livinia Borzese.

Morello married Matteo Zancano from Cremona on 14 October 1633 and the pair moved to Salsomaggiore in Parma to live their new life together. But this would be short and she was widowed at the age of 27 after he died on 11 November 1637. She made a vow to remain chaste after her husband died and tried to join the female branch of the Order of Friars Minor but was rejected due to her widowhood.

She moved and became a spiritual student of the Jesuits in Piacenza in 1640 and also placed herself under their spiritual direction. In obedience to her confessor she began a journal with entries that spanned from 1642 until 1645.

In September 1646 she began to gather a group of women at her home in Parma under the guidance of Saint Ursula and set the foundations for a new religious congregation that she herself would soon establish. She devoted herself to a state of constant penance and charitable works to benefit the lives of others and encouraged this amongst her companions. She declared her order would dedicate itself to the education of girls. The new institute was established on 17 February 1649 – on Ash Wednesday – in which she professed her vows as a member of it. The founder assumed the name of "Brigida of Jesus" and placed her congregation under the care of the Jesuits. Morello was not selected as the first superior but was appointed in 1665 and reconfirmed twice in 1670 and 1675 around the time health began to fail her.

Morello died on 3 September 1679 in Piacenza.

== Beatification ==
Morello's cause was officially opened on 24 July 1928, and she was granted the title of Servant of God. The process had been tasked with collecting all available documentation that would support the cause while undertaking an exhaustive mission to assemble writings that Morello herself had written. Her writings were placed under the care of theologians who had to determine if her writings remained in line with the faith and approved them in two blocs on 14 November 1934 and then a while later on 24 May 1950.

Pope Paul VI opened the next stage of her beatification on 31 May 1971. On 29 April 1980 she was declared to be Venerable after Pope John Paul II confirmed that Morello led a life of heroic virtue.

Investigations into an alleged miracle lasted less than a week in a diocesan process from 28 August 1995 until 30 August. It was validated as a process that performed to the set criteria in 1996 in Rome and received papal approval on 18 December 1997. John Paul II beatified her on 15 March 1998.
