= Giuseppe Chicchi =

Italian politician

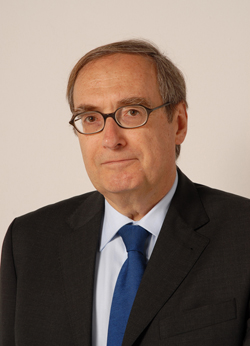
Giuseppe Chicchi

Giuseppe Chicchi (born 10 February 1944) is an Italian politician who served as Mayor of Rimini for three terms (1992–1993, 1993–1995, 1995–1999) and Deputy for the Legislature XV (2006–2008).
