= List of presidents of the Province of Rimini =

President of the Province of Rimini
- Presidente della Provincia di Rimini

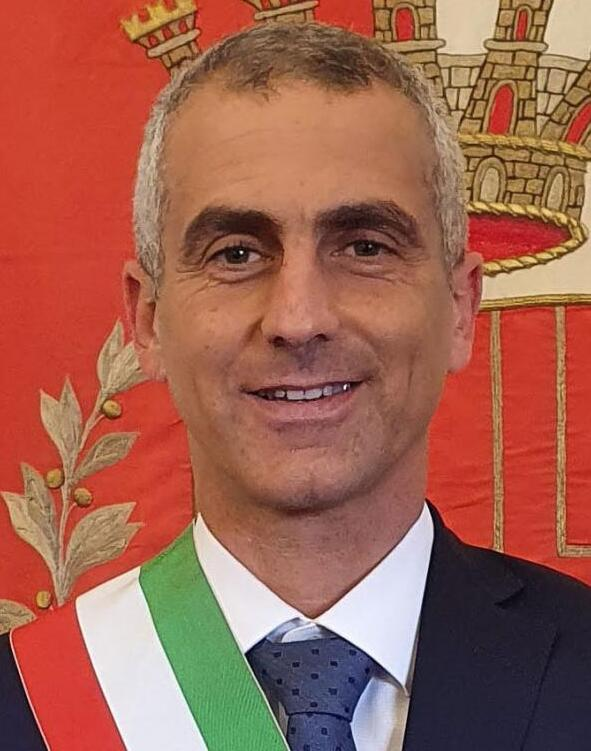
- Incumbent; Jamil Sadegholvaad since 25 November 2022
- Term length: 4 years
- Inaugural holder: Ermanno Vichi
- Formation: 1995

The president of the Province of Rimini is the head of the provincial government in Rimini, Emilia-Romagna, Italy. The president oversees the administration of the province, coordinates the activities of the municipalities, and represents the province in regional and national matters.

Since November 2022, the office has been held by Jamil Sadegholvaad of the Democratic Party.

== History ==
The Province of Rimini was established in 1992, after being separated from the Province of Forlì. In its initial phase, the new province was administered by a government-appointed extraordinary commissioner, Bruno Sbordone, pending the organisation of its institutional bodies. Following the 1995 elections, Ermanno Vichi took office as the first president of the province, marking the beginning of the province's ordinary democratic administration. In accordance with the reform of local authorities introduced in 1993, the president was directly elected by the citizens for a five-year term and was responsible for appointing and dismissing the members of the Provincial Executive.

Following the 2014 Delrio Law, the president is elected by an assembly composed of the mayors and municipal councillors of the municipalities within the province. The president serves a four-year term and acts as the legal representative of the province, presiding over the Provincial Council and the Provincial Assembly of Mayors.

== List ==
| No. | Portrait | Name | Term of office | | Party | Election |
| No. | Portrait | Name | Start | End | Party | Election |
|---|---|---|---|---|---|---|
| 1 | | Ermanno Vichi | 24 April 1995 | 14 June 1999 | Italian People's Party | 1995 |
| 2 | | Ferdinando Fabbri | 14 June 1999 | 15 June 2004 | Democrats of the Left; Democratic Party | 1999 |
| 2 | | Ferdinando Fabbri | 15 June 2004 | 23 June 2009 | Democrats of the Left; Democratic Party | 2004 |
| 3 | | Stefano Vitali | 23 June 2009 | 13 October 2014 | Democratic Party | 2009 |
| 4 | | Andrea Gnassi | 13 October 2014 | 31 October 2018 | Democratic Party | 2014 |
| 5 | | Riziero Santi | 31 October 2018 | 25 November 2022 | Democratic Party | 2018 |
| 6 | | Jamil Sadegholvaad | 25 November 2022 | Incumbent | Democratic Party | 2022 |
