= Corriere Romagna =

Italian daily newspaper

- Type: Daily newspaper
- Format: Berliner
- Editor-in-chief: Gianluca Rossi
- Founded: September 1993; 32 years ago
- Language: Italian
- Headquarters: Rimini, Italy
- ISSN: 2784-8396 (print); 2724-6345 (web)
- Website: corriereromagna.it

The Corriere Romagna (Italian: [korˈrjɛːre roˈmaɲɲa]) is an Italian daily newspaper based in Rimini. It is one of the most-widely circulated newspapers in Emilia-Romagna, along with Il Resto del Carlino.

== History ==
The Corriere Romagna was founded by a cooperative of journalists in 1993; its first issue was published on 10 September 1993. It is currently published in three local editions: Rimini-San Marino, Forlì-Cesena, and Ravenna-Faenza-Lugo-Imola.

== Notable personnel ==
- Giacomo Bedeschi
- Paolo Boldrini
- Pietro Caricato
- Gaetano Foggetti
- Maria Patrizia Lanzetti
- Roberto Masini
- Luca Pavarotti
- Gianluca Rossi
