= Andrea Gnassi =

Italian politician (born 1969)

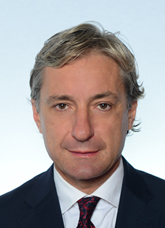

Mayor of Rimini
- In office 31 May 2011 – 7 October 2021
- Preceded by: Alberto Ravaioli
- Succeeded by: Jamil Sadegholvaad

President of the Province of Rimini
- In office 12 October 2014 – 31 October 2018
- Preceded by: Stefano Vitali
- Succeeded by: Riziero Santi

Member of the Chamber of Deputies
- Incumbent
- Assumed office 13 October 2022
- Constituency: Emilia-Romagna

Personal details
- Born: 27 March 1969 (age 57) Rimini, Italy
- Party: PDS (1995-1998); DS (1998-2007); PD (since 2007)
- Education: University of Bologna

Andrea Gnassi (born 27 March 1969, in Rimini) is an Italian politician.

In 2011, Gnassi ran for the Mayor of Rimini as the candidate of the Democratic Party. He won in the second round, defeating the centre-right candidate Gioenzo Renzi with 53.47% of the vote.

In 2016, he won a second mandate as Mayor of Rimini after obtaining 37.39% of the vote in the first round and 56.99% of the vote in a runoff against centre-right candidate Marzio Pecci.

Political offices
Preceded by Alberto Ravaioli	Mayor of Rimini; 2011 – 2021	Succeeded by Jamil Sadegholvaad
Preceded by Stefano Vitali	President of the Province of Rimini; 2014 – 2018	Succeeded by Riziero Santi
