= Ursuline Sisters Daughters of Mary Immaculate =

- Suore Orsoline Figlie di Maria Immacolata
- Founder: Zefirino Agostini
- Founded at: Verona
- Type: Congregation of pontifical right
- Website: http://www.orsolineverona.it/

The Ursuline Sisters Daughters of Mary Immaculate (Italian: Suore Orsoline Figlie di Maria Immacolata) are members of a Verona-based Catholic congregation of sisters. The main purpose of the congregation is the human and Christian training of young people.

== History ==
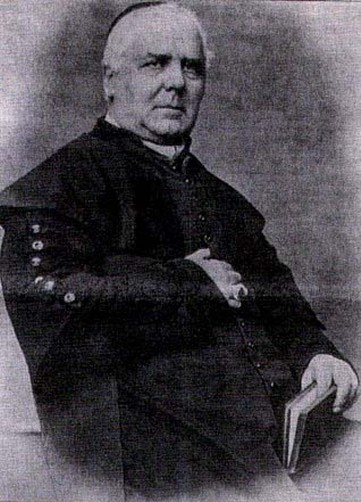
Blessed Zefirino Agostini

In 1856, the Blessed Zefirino Agostini, a parish priest, opened with some girls of an oratory of Verona a school for poor girls of the parish of Saints Nazarius and Celsus, after he had asked for his bishop's permission. His work was supported by women who lived with their families and formed the Pious Union of Devout Sisters of Saint Angela, but in 1860 some of them started to live in community.

In 1869, Luigi di Canossa, the bishop of Verona, got Zefirino Agostini to refound in his diocese the defunct company of Saint Ursula of Verona, a community inspired by the teachings of Saint Angela Merici. The "external" and "internal" members worked together until 1901, when the former embraced the rule of Saint Angela Merici and the latter adopted a new rule. The second group became a congregation of pontifical right in 1940.

It spread in Italy and settled in Madagascar in 1960, in Switzerland in 1964, in Uruguay in 1965, in Brazil in 1979, in Paraguay and Burkina Faso in 1992, in Peru in 2001, in Benin in 2002 and in Togo in 2006.

== Activities ==
In addition to the formal education of young people, it is involved in different activities, such as pastoral care, catechism, housing for people in difficulty, student housing, hostels and dispensaries (in Madagascar).
