= Institute of consecrated life =

Catholic association bound by vows

An institute of consecrated life is an association of faithful in the Catholic Church canonically erected by competent church authorities to enable men or women who publicly profess the evangelical counsels by religious vows or other sacred bonds "through the charity to which these counsels lead to be joined to the Church and its mystery in a special way." They are defined in the 1983 Code of Canon Law under canons 573–730. The Dicastery for Institutes of Consecrated Life and Societies of Apostolic Life has ecclesiastical oversight of institutes of consecrated life.

The more numerous form of these are religious institutes, which are characterized by the public profession of vows, life in common as brothers or sisters, and a degree of separation from the world. They are defined in the 1983 Code of Canon Law under canons 607–709. The other form is that of secular institutes, in which the members live in the world, and work for the sanctification of the world from within.

== Classification ==
There are two categories of institutes of consecrated life identified in the Code of Canon Law: religious institutes, and secular institutes. In addition, there are Societies of Apostolic Life that resemble institutes of consecrated life, but their members do not take religious vows.

Consecrated persons are lay persons or clerics who assume the evangelical counsels by means of a sacred bond, and become members of an institute of consecrated life. They are clerical if, with recognition from the Church, their founder intended the order or institute to be directed by clerics and exercise sacred orders, and they are lay if recognized by the Church as having a proper function defined by the founder or by legitimate tradition, which does not include the exercise of sacred orders (Canon 588).

For instance, the Society of Jesus (Jesuits) is a clerical institute of consecrated life as their members are clerics, whereas the Sisters of Charity are a lay institute of religious sisters.

=== Religious institute ===
A religious institute is an institute of consecrated life whose members take public vows and lead a fraternal life in common (Canon 607.2). They are broadly termed as religious and include monastic orders, mendicant orders, canons regular, and clerics regular. Some religious institutes engage in a particular ministry such as education, healthcare, or social work; while others have as their primary apostolate contemplative prayer.

The 1983 version of the Code of Canon Law has not maintained the distinction, found in the 1917 version, between orders (religious institutes in which the members took solemn vows) and congregations (those in which simple vows were taken).

=== Secular institute ===
A secular institute is an institute of consecrated life whose members live in the world, strive for the perfection of charity and seek to help to sanctify the world, especially from within (Canon 710). They work in a variety of occupations and may live alone or with their family; others live in a common house with other institute members. Each institute has a particular spirituality shaped by its founders and leaders. Some religious institutes have an affiliated Secular Third Order, which are not secular institutes but are associations of the lay faithful.

== Historical-Juridical list in the Annuario Pontificio ==
The Annuario Pontificio lists for both men and women the institutes of consecrated life that are of pontifical right (those that the Holy See has erected or approved by formal decree). For the men, it gives what it now calls the Historical-Juridical List of Precedence. The arrangement of the institutes for men of the Latin Church in this list dates back many decades. It is found, for instance, in the 1964 edition of the Annuario Pontificio, pp. 807–870, where the heading is "States of Perfection (of pontifical right for men)." In the 1969 edition the heading has become "Religious and Secular Institutes of Pontifical Right for Men", a form it kept until 1975 inclusive. Since 1976, when work was already advanced on revising the Code of Canon Law, the list has been qualified as "historical-juridical" and still distinguishes "orders" from "congregations" in the case of Latin Church men, while not separating out "orders" and "congregations" in the case of the Eastern Catholic Churches and Latin Church women.

It arranges the institutes for men as follows:

A. Institutes of consecrated life

a. Religious institutes

I. Orders

1. Canons regular
2. Monastic orders
3. Mendicant orders
4. Clerics regular

II. Clerical religious congregations
III. Lay religious congregations
IV. Eastern orders, religious congregations, and societies of apostolic life

b. Secular institutes

I. Clerical secular institutes
II. Lay secular institutes

B. Societies of apostolic life

The institutes for women are arranged alphabetically in the following categories:

A. Institutes of consecrated life

a. Religious institutes

I. Orders and institutes with autonomous houses
II. Centralized institutes

B. Societies of apostolic life

These lists are followed by a list of 6 institutes under the heading "Other Institutes of Consecrated Life", a reference to new forms of consecrated life established in accordance with Canons 604 §2 and 605 of the Code of Canon Law. Some of these have both male and female members, and one is open to married couples.

== Catholic institutes of consecrated life ==
Institutes of consecrated life need the written approval of a bishop to operate within his diocese. Effective 10 November 2020, Pope Francis modified the 1983 Code of Canon Law to require a bishop to acquire the Apostolic See's approval in writing and reserved to the Apostolic See the final determination over the erection of an institute of consecrated life.

List of some religious institutes (Catholic) provides a dynamic list of a selection of Catholic religious institutes. Catholic secular institutes are less numerous.

== See also ==
- Religious institute
- Secular institute
- Society of apostolic life
