= Angela Merici =

Christian saint

Saint Angela Merici
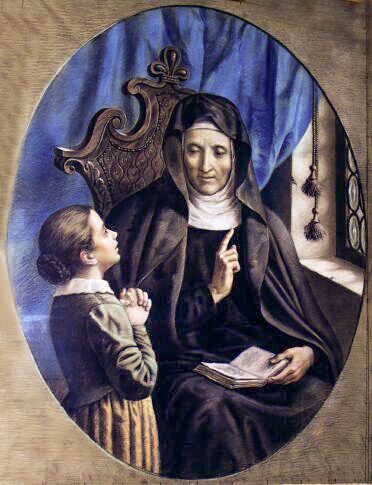
- St. Angela Merici Teaching by Pietro Calzavacca (mid-19th century)

Virgin and foundress
- Born: 21 March 1474; Desenzano del Garda, Republic of Venice
- Died: 27 January 1540 (aged 65); Brescia, Republic of Venice
- Beatified: 30 April 1768, Rome, Papal States, by Pope Clement XIII
- Canonized: 24 May 1807, Rome, Papal States, by Pope Pius VII
- Major shrine: Sanctuary of St. Angela Merici, Brescia, Italy
- Feast: 27 January; 31 May (1861–1955); 1 June (1955–1969)
- Attributes: Cloak, ladder
- Patronage: Sickness, handicapped people, loss of parents, courage, strength, and determination

Angela Merici (/məˈriːtʃi/ mə-REE-chee, Italian: [ˈandʒela meˈriːtʃi]; 21 March 1474 – 27 January 1540) was an Italian Catholic religious educator who founded the Company of St. Ursula in 1535 in Brescia, in which women dedicated their lives to the service of the church through the education of girls.

From this organisation later sprang the Order of Saint Ursula, whose nuns established places of prayer and learning throughout Europe and, later, worldwide, most notably in North America.

After her death, Merici was venerated by Catholics around the world and a cause for sainthood was opened. She was canonized by Pope Pius VII in 1807.

== Life ==
Merici was born in 1474 on a farm near Desenzano del Garda, a small town on the southwestern shore of Lake Garda in Lombardy, Italy. She and her older sister, Giana Maria, were left orphans when she was ten years old. They went to live with their uncle in the town of Salò. Young Angela was very distressed when her sister suddenly died without receiving the last rites of the church and prayed that her sister's soul rest in peace. It is said that in a vision she received a response that her sister was in heaven in the company of the saints. She joined the Third Order of St. Francis around that time. People began to notice Angela's beauty and particularly to admire her hair. As she had promised herself to God, and wanted to avoid the worldly attention, she dyed her hair with soot.

Merici's uncle died when she was twenty years old and she returned to her home in Desenzano, and lived with her brothers, on her own property, given to her in lieu of the dowry that would otherwise have been hers had she married. She later had another vision that revealed to her that she was to found an association of virgins who were to devote their lives to the religious training of young girls. This association was a success and she was invited to start another school in the neighboring city of Brescia.

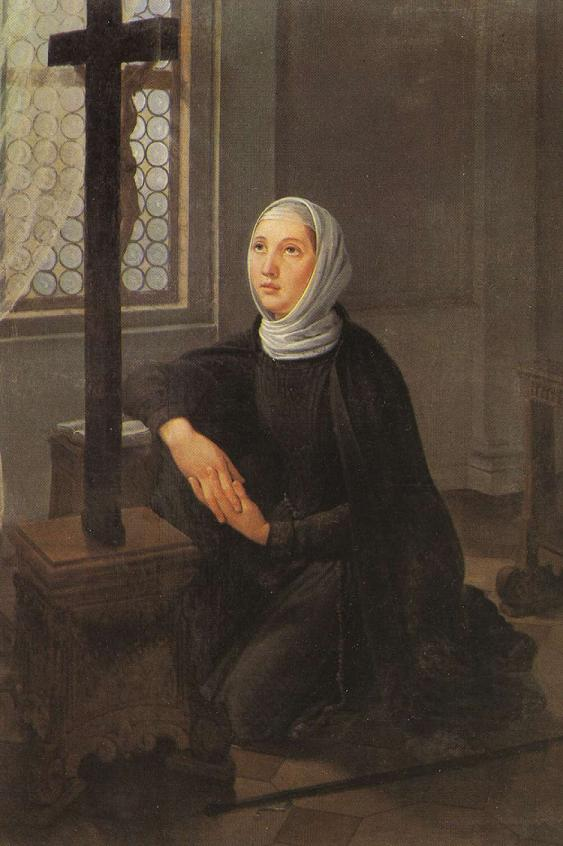
St. Angela Merici (17th century)

According to legend, in 1524, while traveling to the Holy Land, Merici suddenly became blind when she was on the island of Crete. Despite this, she continued her journey to the Holy Land and was ostensibly cured of her blindness on her return, while praying before a crucifix, at the same place where she had been struck with blindness a few weeks earlier. In 1525, she journeyed to Rome in order to gain the indulgences of the Jubilee Year then being celebrated. Pope Clement VII, who had heard of her virtue and success with her school, invited her to remain in Rome. Merici disliked notoriety, however, and soon returned to Brescia.

On 25 November 1535, Merici gathered with 12 young women who had joined in her work in a small house in Brescia near the Church of Saint Afra, where together they committed themselves in the founding of the Company of St. Ursula, placed under the protection of the patroness of medieval universities. Her goal was to elevate family life through the Christian education of future wives and mothers. They were the first teaching order of women religious.

Four years later the group had grown to 28. Merici taught her companions to serve God, while remain in the world, teaching the girls of their own neighborhood, and to practice a religious form of life in their own homes. (Note: In this, they anticipated the secular psys that were approved by the Catholic Church during the 1950s.) The members wore no special habit and took no formal religious vows. Merici wrote a Rule of Life for the group, which specified the practice of celibacy, poverty and obedience in their own homes. The Ursulines opened orphanages and schools. On 18 March 1537, she was elected "Mother and Mistress" of the group. The Rule she had written was approved in 1544 by Pope Paul III.

When Merici died in Brescia on 27 January 1540, there were 24 communities of the Company of St. Ursula serving the Catholic Church through the region. Her body was clothed in the habit of a Franciscan tertiary and was interred in the Church of Sant'Afra.

The traditional view is that Merici believed that better Christian education was needed for girls and young women, to which end she dedicated her life. Querciolo Mazzonis argues that the Company of St. Ursula was not originally intended as a charitable group specifically focused on the education of poor girls, but that this direction developed after her death in 1540, sometime after it received formal recognition in 1546.

== Veneration ==
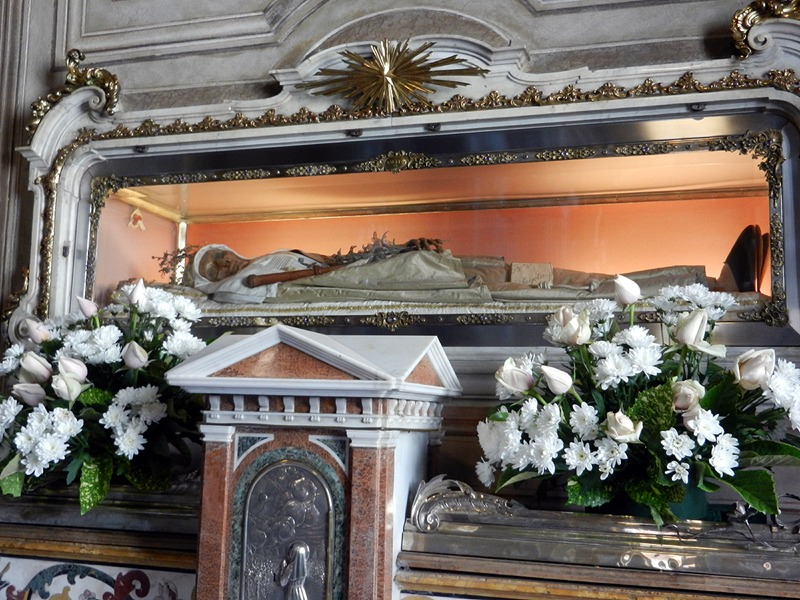
The incorrupt body of Saint Angela Merici in Brescia, Italy

During her life, Merici had often prayed at the tombs of the Brescian martyrs at the Church of St. Afra in Brescia. She lived in small rooms attached to a priory of the Canons Regular of the Lateran. According to her wishes, after her death, she was interred in the Church of St Afra to be near the martyrs' remains. There her body remained until the complete destruction of this church and its surrounding area by Allied bombing during the Second World War, on 2 March 1945, in which the parish priest and many townspeople died. The church and corresponding buildings were afterwards rebuilt, and reopened on 10 April 1954. The church was consecrated on 27 January 1956, with a new dedication to Saint Angela Merici, while the Parish of St. Afra was transferred to the neighboring Church of St. Eufemia.

Merici was beatified in Rome on 30 April 1768, by Pope Clement XIII. She was later canonized on 24 May 1807 by Pope Pius VII.

=== Feast day ===
Merici was not included in the 1570 Tridentine calendar of Pope Pius V because she was not canonized until 1807. In 1861, her feast day was included in the Roman calendar – not on the day of her death, 27 January, since this date was occupied by the feast day of Saint John Chrysostom, but instead on 31 May. In 1955, Pope Pius XII assigned this date to the new feast of the Queenship of Mary, and moved Merici's feast to 1 June.

However, for the Ursulines of the Roman Union, the Sacred Congregation of Rites on 29 January 1929 has permitted them to celebrate the Saint's feast on her dies natalis, which is 27 January and ranked as Double of the First Class with a common octave. The same Congregation also allowed them to celebrate her proper Feast as in the General Roman Calendar, which is 31 May. This particular Mass has the introit Gaudeamus and a proper Gradual and Alleluia, but the prayers are taken as usual from the Missal.

The celebration was ranked as a Double until 1960, when Pope John XXIII gave it the equivalent rank of Third-Class Feast. Lastly, in the major 1969 reform of the liturgy, Pope Paul VI moved the celebration, ranked as a Memorial, to the saint's day of death, 27 January.

=== Dedications ===
- Parishes are dedicated to St. Angela Merici in Pacific Grove, California; Brea, California; Metairie, Louisiana; White Oak, Pennsylvania; Fairview Park, Ohio; Windsor, Ontario, Canada; Missouri City, Texas Louisville, Kentucky and Youngstown, Ohio.
- There are St. Angela Merici Parishes and Schools in Florissant, Missouri, The Bronx, New York; and Missouri City, Texas.
- St. Angela Merici Catholic School, Bradford, Ontario, Canada.
- St. Angela Merici Catholic School, Windsor, Ontario, Canada.
- St. Angela Merici Catholic School, Chatham, Ontario, Canada.
- St. Angela Merici Academy, Coeur d'Alene, Idaho, United States.
- St. Angela Merici Catholic School, Chatham, Ontario. Canada
- St. Angela Merici Montessori School, Dasmariñas, Cavite, Philippines
- St. Angela's College, Cork, Ireland.
- St. Angela's College, Sligo
- St. Angela's School, Ursuline Convent Waterford, Waterford, Ireland.
- Ursuline College, Cleveland, Ohio, U.S.A.
- Ursuline College, Blackrock, Cork, Ireland
- Ursuline College Thurles, Tipperary, Ireland.
- St. Angela's Ursuline RA School Forest Gate, London, United Kingdom
- Merici College, Braddon, ACT, Australia.
- École St. Angela Merici, Regina, Saskatchewan, Canada.
- St. Angela Merici Catholic Church and School, Metairie, Louisiana, U.S.A.

== See also ==
- List of Catholic saints
- Incorruptibility
- Saint Angela Merici, patron saint archive

== Bibliography ==
- Q. Mazzonis, "The Impact of Renaissance Gender-Related Notions on the Female Experience of the Sacred: The Case of Angela Merici's Ursulines," in Laurence Lux-Sterritt and Carmen Mangion (eds), Gender, Catholicism and Spirituality: Women and the Roman Catholic Church in Britain and Europe, 1200–1900 (Basingstoke, Palgrave Macmillan, 2011),
