= Secular institute =

Catholic organization

In the Catholic Church, a secular institute is one of the forms of consecrated life recognized in Church law (1983 Code of Canon Law Canons 710–730):

A secular institute is an institute of consecrated life in which the Christian faithful living in the world strive for the perfection of charity and work for the sanctification of the world, especially from within. (Canon 710)

Secular consecrated persons profess the evangelical counsels of chastity, poverty, and obedience while living in the world, as distinct from members of religious institutes, whose members live a communal life separate, to some degree, from the world, often with specific apostolates.

== Description ==
"We are the newest vocation in the Catholic Church, and many say we are the vocation of the new millennium."

The historical origins of these institutes go back to the end of the sixteenth century, even though their juridic recognition as a state of consecrated life approved by the Church took place only on 2 February 1947, with Pope Pius XII's Apostolic Constitution Provida Mater Ecclesia. The Second Vatican Council's Decree on the Adaptation and Renewal of Religious Life (Perfectae Caritatis) included secular institutes within its scope, "without prejudice to their special characteristics", or to those of "societies of common life without vows".

Most members of secular institutes do not live together, although some do. They lead their normal lives "in the world" in a variety of occupations. Each institute has a particular spirituality shaped by its founders and leaders.

Most members of secular institutes are lay people. Some join as diocesan priests or deacons, and some institutes are founded specifically for diocesan priests who wish to take vows and lead a consecrated life while still being incardinated in their diocese and working in the diocesan framework. Some secular institutes even train and incardinate their own priests.

Secular institutes are recognized either by a bishop (diocesan right) or by the Holy See (papal right). Most are registered with the World Conference of Secular Institutes (Conference Mondiale des Instituts Seculiers: CMIS).

== Statistics ==
The exact number of members of secular institutes worldwide is unclear. A 2018 survey by CMIS reported approximately 24,000 members, but noted that not all institutes surveyed provided data, and that some institutes provided inconsistent responses.

As of 2018, CMIS reported a total of 184 secular institutes worldwide.

There are nine secular institutes in the UK. These institutes belong to the National Conference of Secular Institutes (NCSI), an association for cooperation and mutual support of those secular institutes which have membership in the United Kingdom. The NCSI is affiliated with the Conference Mondiale des Instituts Seculiers (CMIS), which represents all secular institutes in the world. There are 30 secular institutes in the United States.

== Some notable secular institutes ==
- Caritas Christi
- Company of St. Paul
- Company of St. Ursula
- Institute of the Maids of the Poor (M.O.P.)
- Schoenstatt Apostolic Movement
- Secular Institute of Pius X (I.S.P.X.)
- Servite Secular Institute (S.S.I.)
- Society of Our Lady of the Way

== See also ==
- Religious institute
- Society of apostolic life
- Vocational discernment in the Catholic Church
