= Oreste Benzi =

Italian priest

Servant of God Oreste Benzi
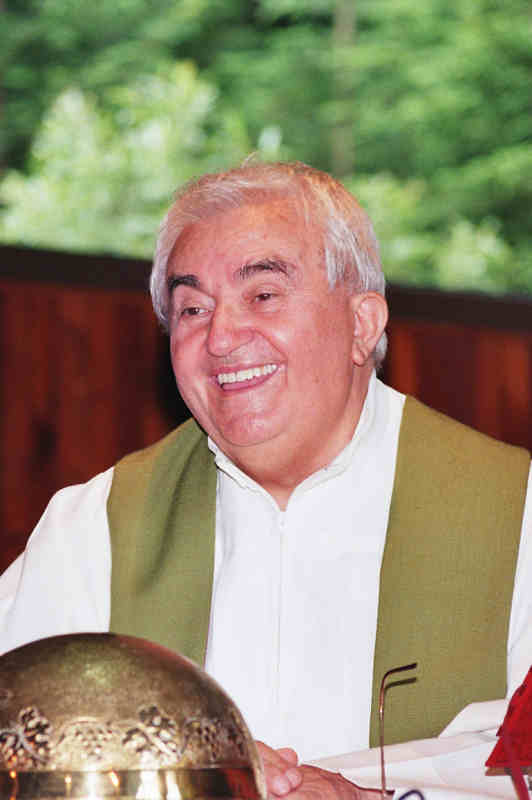
- Born: 7 September 1925; San Clemente, Emilia-Romagna, Kingdom of Italy
- Died: 2 November 2007 (aged 82); Rimini, Emilia-Romagna, Italy
- Resting place: Monumental Cemetery of Rimini

Oreste Benzi (7 September 1925 - 2 November 2007) was an Italian Catholic priest and founder of the Pope John XXIII Community Association. Benzi championed the rights of the individual and founded his association to aid teenagers in their lives and their path to Jesus Christ while also striving to evangelize to those including the destitute.

The beatification process commenced in 2014 under Pope Francis. Benzi is titled as a Servant of God.

== Life ==
Oreste Benzi was born in San Clemente on 7 September 1925 as the seventh of nine children to the poor Achille Benzi and Rosa Silvagni. Rosa instilled a sense of great piousness in her children.

Benzi had to repeat his first grade at school due to contracting the measles and being ill all winter which prevented him from attending school. His second-grade teacher Olga Baldani spoke of a priest and of a scientist and explorer in a tale meant to challenge the students as to what would seem the better profession. This had a profound impact on Benzi who returned home and told his mother that he wanted to become a priest.

Benzi commenced his studies for the priesthood in 1937 first at Urbino for a brief period of time and then at Rimini. He transferred his studies to Bologna due to Allied bombings during World War II around Rimini. Benzi was ordained to the priesthood on 29 June 1949 by Luigi Santa, Bishop of Rimini. He was appointed as the chaplain for the parish of San Nicolò in Rimini on 5 July 1949 and in October 1950 was made a teacher of seminarians and later the vice-assistant for Catholic Youth; he became the assistant in 1952. In 1953, Benzi became the spiritual director of students in Rimini. He later oversaw the establishment of an Alpine vacation home for teenagers in Alba di Canazei (built between 1958 and 1961) that saw him make several visits to the United States of America in order to raise funds.

In 1968 he founded the Pope John XXIII Community, in honor of Pope John XXIII, though formal establishment as an "association" was not until 1971. The priest opened the first home for families at Coriano on 3 July 1973 and he officiated at its official opening. The Italian government recognized the movement, for legal reasons, on 5 July 1972 while it received diocesan recognition on 25 May 1983 as an "ecclesial gathering". The Pontifical Council for the Laity recognized Benzi's movement as an "association of the faithful" on 7 October 1998.

Benzi was known for his action in defense of the marginalised and his battle against prostitution and homosexual unions. His work bought him into contact several times with Pope John Paul II. From 1969 until 2000 he served as a parish priest at the Resurrection parish in the Grotta Rossa neighbourhood of Rimini. The likes of Mother Teresa and Maximilian Kolbe inspired him and spiritual writers such as Cardinal Henri de Lubac and Antoine Chevrier also inspired him.

Benzi died on 2 November 2007 at 2:22 am after suffering a heart attack. More than 10 000 mourners attended his funeral and it included several of the prostitutes that he had rescued; the Bishop of Rimini Francesco Lambiasi officiated the funeral. Benzi is buried in the Monumental Cemetery of Rimini.

His movement is now present in a total of 27 European countries as well as being present in Asia and Africa as well as Latin America; amongst the nations it operates in are the United Kingdom and Australia.

== Beatification process ==
The beatification process commenced under Pope Francis on 3 January 2014 after the Congregation for the Causes of Saints issued the official nihil obstat and named him as a Servant of God; the Bishop of Rimini Francesco Lambiasi inaugurated the diocesan process on 27 September 2014 and it is still ongoing.

The postulator for this cause - since its beginning - is Elisabetta Casadei.

== Selected writings ==
Benzi wrote more than sixty books during his life, many of which are untranslated into English as of 2019. Along with his activity of missionary and educator among the young children, he was devoted to the prayer in honour of the Blessed Virgin Mary and the Saints. He is the author of some unusual spiritual writings on the Real Presence the Triune of God into the human heart, ls called as Mystical Union of Christ. In such a way, he shared a spiritual life like the one testified by Itala Mela and Chiara Lubich.

- Oreste Benzi; Giovanni Paolo Ramonda (2013). Non spegnete lo Spirito: Abitati dall'amore di Dio. Vivere in Gesù : collana di spiritualità (in Italian). Rimini: Sempre comunicazione. ISBN 9788889807460. OCLC 955225132.
- ——; Francesco Lambiasi; Giovanni Paolo Ramonda (2013). L'unione mistica con Cristo (in Italian). Rimini: Sempre comunicazion. p. 151. ISBN 9788889807446. OCLC 955943367.
- —— (2002). Ho scoperto perché Dio sta zitto. Uomini e religioni. Milano: Mondadori. p. 154. ISBN 9788804504009. OCLC 716592545.
- ——; Aldo Buonaiuto (2005). Le mani occulte : viaggio nel mondo del satanismo: [le porte degli inferi non prevarranno] (in Italian). Rome: Città nuova. p. 784. ISBN 9788831174671. OCLC 70275920.
- —— (1991). L'eclisse del padre nella famiglia oggi (in Italian). Rimini: Edizioni Sempre. p. 47. OCLC 964077064.

== See also ==
- Streetwise priest
