= Reformist Area =

Political organisations in Italy

Reformist Area Area Riformista
- Leaders: Roberto Speranza; Pier Luigi Bersani; Guglielmo Epifani; Vasco Errani
- Founded: April 2014
- Dissolved: February 2017
- Merged into: Article One
- Ideology: Social democracy Democratic socialism
- Political position: Left-wing

Reformist Area (Area Riformista, AR) was a social-democratic and democratic-socialist association, which used to be a faction within the Democratic Party (PD), a political party in Italy, before joining Article One.

It was founded in April 2014 by a substantial number of supporters of Gianni Cuperlo in the 2013 leadership election, in which Cuperlo was defeated by Matteo Renzi. AR, which was mostly composed of Bersaniani, Dalemiani and Lettiani, found its leader in Roberto Speranza, the party's floor leader in the Chamber of Deputies.

In April 2015 Speranza, who dissented from Renzi on electoral reform, resigned from his post. This move weakened his leadership over the so-called "dialoguing left" (with Renzi) and ultimately broke the faction's unity and ranks. 70 MPs of AF, including Cesare Damiano, Matteo Mauri, Enzo Amendola, Paola De Micheli and Luciano Pizzetti, joined forces with Maurizio Martina, minister of Agriculture and leading member of the Remake Italy faction, and formed Left is Change, while what remained of AF, under the leadership of Speanza and Pier Luigi Bersani, started a rapprochement with Cuperlo's LeftDem.

In February 2017, after months of bickering with Renzi, AR left the PD and launched the DP, along with Enrico Rossi's Democratic Socialists and Arturo Scotto's splinters from the Italian Left, a left-wing party.
