= 360 Association =

Italian political faction

360 Association Associazione 360
- Leader: Enrico Letta
- Other members: Alessia Mosca; Guglielmo Vaccaro; Marco Meloni
- Founded: 2007
- Ideology: Centrism; Christian left
- Political position: Centre to Centre-left

360 Association (Associazione 360) is an Italian centrist to centre-left association connected to the Democratic Party (PD). It is led by Enrico Letta, which is why its members are often called Lettiani.

The association was founded during the summer of 2007 in support of the candidacy of Enrico Letta, a former Christian Democrat, to the leadership of the newly formed party and represents a centrist position within the party, as he has good relations with almost all the factions of the party, including Veltroniani, Rutelliani, Dalemiani and the Reformists and Democrats, Olivists, of which he has been considered a member, and The Populars, of which he is currently member.

One major goals of the group is to lead the party into an alliance with the Union of Christian and Centre Democrats (UDC), while it is critical with the populist Italy of Values party, a traditional ally of the Democrats. In a meeting organized by 360 in June 2008 in Piacenza, UDC leader Pier Ferdinando Casini, explained that he could easily be member of a party alongside Letta, but not with Antonio Di Pietro's Italy of Values.

Umberto Ranieri, a former Democrat of the Left, is president of the association.

== History ==
=== Democrats for Letta ===
The candidacy of Letta in the 2007 Democratic primary election was supported by the Democrats for Letta lists, representing the liberal component of the Ulivists, that is to say the faction which was closer to Romano Prodi, and including Paolo De Castro, Umberto Ranieri, Gianni Pittella (leader of the Italian delegation to the Party of European Socialists in the European Parliament), Renato Soru (and his Sardinia Project party), Vito De Filippo, Gian Mario Spacca, Lorenzo Dellai, Marco Stradiotto and Francesco Boccia. Soru, De Filippo, Spacca and Dellai were respectively President of Sardinia, Basilicata, Marche and Trentino, and the last three represented the more conservative and traditionally Christian-democratic faction within Democracy is Freedom – The Daisy, the party of which Letta was a leading member, while Ranieri and Pittella represented the more centrist wing of the Democrats of the Left.

The Democrats for Letta list won 11.0% of the vote nationally, having its strongholds in Northern Italy and in some regions of the South.

=== Bersani-Letta ===
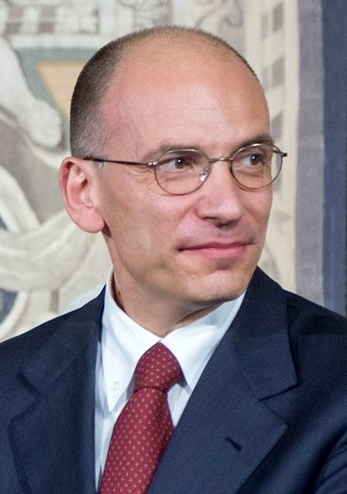
Enrico Letta

In June 2008 some Lettiani joined forces with Dalemiani, the group around Massimo D'Alema, who himself supports the alliance with UDC and a more structured party. Paolo De Castro even became president of the new association of D'Alema, the Reformists and Democrats, while Francesco Boccia, a former Christian Democrat like Letta, announced that he, as "left-wing Catholic", has no problems with joining the Party of European Socialists, which is the main goal of Dalemiani.

In the 2009 Democratic Party leadership election Letta and his group thus supported Pier Luigi Bersani. Soon after his election, Bersani appointed Letta as his deputy forming the so-called "Bersani-Letta" ticket.

In June 2010 the association organized a three-day meeting in Verona, during which the party, through its deputy-leader Letta, met entrepreneurs and key leaders of Lega Nord, the largest party in Veneto and eastern Lombardy. An opinion poll among northern Democrats, released during the "Nord Camp", showed that they are keener on an alliance with Lega Nord than The People of Freedom (43% vs. 30%). Letta was praised both by Roberto Maroni and Umberto Bossi.

== Leadership ==
- President: Umberto Ranieri (2008–present)
  - Vice President: Alessia Mosca (2010–present)
- Director: Monica Nardi (2008–present)
- Secretary: Marco Meloni (2008–2010), Francesco Russo (2010–present)
- Executive functions: Enrico Letta, Guglielmo Vaccaro, Marco Meloni, Alessia Mosca, Monica Nardi, Francesco Russo
