= Fourth Phase =

Fourth Phase (Quarta Fase, QF) is a faction within the Democratic Party (PD), a political party in Italy.

The name of the faction was chosen to identify the new stage of left-wing Catholics in Italian politics, the first three being within the Italian People's Party (1919–1926), the Christian Democracy (1943–1994) and the Italian People's Party respectively, and the fourth the current one, with the Democratic Party, a party in which Catholics are a minority. This phase, according to the faction's website, started with the foundation of Democracy is Freedom – The Daisy (DL), that put together Populars with people coming from different political traditions.

The heirs of the left wing of the late Christian Democracy and later the Italian People's Party (1994–2002), a Christian-democratic party of the Christian left, organized themselves within DL as The Populars. Between 2002 and 2007 the Populars, led by Franco Marini and Ciriaco De Mita, within DL. In the 2007 Democratic Party primary election around 600 Populars were elected to the party Constituent Assembly.

As the Populars failed to find a common ground in the new party, they split in different groups. The bulk of the faction (Marini, Dario Franceschini, Giuseppe Fioroni, Antonello Soro and Pierluigi Castagnetti) supported Walter Veltroni as leader of the party. Rosy Bindi and Enrico Letta ran against Veltroni and set up their factions, Democrats Really and 360 Association respectively. Another leading member, Ciriaco De Mita, abandoned the PD over disagreements with Veltroni in early 2008. The failure of The Populars to be a united faction led Fioroni, Franceschini and Soro, backed by Marini, to set Fourth Phase.

As of January 2009 the organization of the new faction was completed: Antonello Giacomelli was elected president of the faction, which counts almost 90 Democrat MPs. However also Franceschini and Fioroni, who is the real leader of the group and the heir of Marini, had their differences, the first being a keen supporter of Walter Veltroni and the second more interested in unifying former Christian Democrats and Catholics in general within the party, including the Teodems, the Olivists, the followers of Bindi, the Lettiani and the Social Christians.

After the resignation of Veltroni as party secretary and its replacement with Franceschini, Fourth Phase chose to support Franceschini in the 2009 Democratic Party leadership election. Franceschini lost to Pier Luigi Bersani but the Populars of Fourth Phase, who constituted about the 60% of the members elected to the party's national assembly by the Franceschini list, were not eager to oppose Bersani, while Franceschini was more combative. They however joined AreaDem, the united minority faction led by Franceschini.

Things turned upside down in mid 2010 when Franceschini started to re-approach with Bersani and Fioroni became very critical of the party's political line instead. When Veltroni organized a "movement" outside Democratic Area, it was joined by Fioroni and 35 Populars around him. This caused a split between this group and the Populars loyal to Franceschini. The future of Fourth Phase, which is however in the hands of Fioroni, is thus unclear.
