= Franceschiniani =

Faction of the Italian Democratic Party

Franceschiniani refers to the followers of Dario Franceschini, a leading member of the Democratic Party (PD), a political party in Italy.

== Career ==
Franceschini, who before joining the PD, had been a member of Christian Democracy (DC), the Social Christians (CS), the Italian People's Party (PPI) and Democracy is Freedom – The Daisy (DL), was a faction leader both in the PPI and DL. In the final months of DL and at the foundation of the PD in 2007, Franceschiniani were one of the two leading centrist groups, along with Rutelliani. Franceschini was the PD's deputy secretary under Walter Veltroni in 2007–2009 (see 2007 leadership election) and secretary for a few months in 2009, until he was defeated by Pier Luigi Bersani in the 2009 leadership election.

In 2009 Franceschini organised his followers into AreaDem, a larger faction including also leading former Democrats of the Left. Since 2013 Franceschiniani and Democratic Area sided with Matteo Renzi, who was elected secretary in the 2013 leadership election, while maintaining an autonomous position within the party.

== See also ==
- The Populars
- Fourth Phase
