= Reformists and Democrats =

Italian political faction

Official logo

Reformists and Democrats (Riformisti e Democratici, ReD) was a predominantly social-democratic faction within the Democratic Party (PD), a political party in Italy. Its most notable member was Massimo D'Alema.

== Background ==
It was founded in June 2004 as an association of more than 100 MPs close to the Fondazione ItalianiEuropei, a think tank led by D'Alema, and was mainly composed of long-time Dalemiani, such as Pier Luigi Bersani, Nicola Latorre, Marco Minniti, Barbara Pollastrini and Michele Ventura. Also some Lettiani, including Paolo De Castro and Francesco Boccia, and some Populars, including Nicodemo Oliverio and Lino Duilio (former president of Popular Italy), joined the group. De Castro was president, Duilio vice president and Ventura coordinator.

ReD, which proposed a structured model of party and its entry in the Party of European Socialists, had been increasingly critical of Walter Veltroni when secretary, so that in the 2009 Democratic Party leadership election most of its leading members supported the leadership bid of Pier Luigi Bersani, who was elected as the new party secretary.

== Leadership ==
- President: Paolo De Castro
  - Vice President: Lino Duilio
  - Coordinator: Michele Ventura
