= NetworkDem =

NetworkDem (ReteDem) is a social-democratic faction within the Democratic Party (PD), a political party in Italy.

The faction was launched in July 2015 by a group of social democrats, who had supported Giuseppe Civati in the 2013 leadership election (in the event, he came third with 14.2% of the vote), but disagreed with his decision to leave the PD in May 2015. They notably included Paolo Gandolfi, Sergio Lo Giudice, Lucrezia Ricchiuti, Daniele Viotti and Sandra Zampa. However, most former Civatiani joined Civati's Possible (Luca Pastorino, Elly Schlein, Andrea Ranieri, etc.) or decided to stay in the PD without joining any faction (Felice Casson, Walter Tocci, etc.), or joined the Italian Left (Corradino Mineo). Some left the PD in 2017 through Article One.

In the run-up of the 2017 leadership election NetworkDem endorsed Andrea Orlando of Remake Italy for party leader.
