= Veltroniani =

- Leader: Walter Veltroni
- Other members: Francesco Rutelli; Paolo Gentiloni
- Ideology: Social democracy Social liberalism Christian left
- Political position: Centre-left

Veltroniani referred to the followers of Walter Veltroni, leader of the Democratic Party, a political party in Italy, from 2007 to 2009. Most of them are social democrats coming from the Democrats of the Left.

Apart the core group of Veltroniani, there are some distinct factions within the Democratic Party whose members are usually considered veltroniani:

- Liberal PD
- Democratic Ecologists
- Social Christians

During Veltroni's leadership, leading members of the area were Goffredo Bettini, Giorgio Tonini and Enrico Morando. Then there was a group of former Rutelliani, including notably Paolo Gentiloni and Ermete Realacci, who became very close to Veltroni and to his idea of Democratic Party. In strict terms Veltroniani are generally progressives and modernizers, as opposed to Dalemiani who are more traditional social democrats.

After the departure of Veltroni from party leadership in February 2009, Veltroniani talked about organizing their faction, but finally there was a split between the staunch supporters of the new leader Dario Franceschini and those who soon started to criticize him. The first group includes mainly centrist figures, notably Tonini and Realacci, while the latter, mainly social democrats coming from the Italian Communist Party, led by Bettini and Michele Meta, launched a new faction, the Democrats in Network.

In the 2009 Democratic Party leadership election the bulk of Veltroniani and Veltroni himself supported Franceschini, while the Democrats in Netweork of Bettini and Meta supported Ignazio Marino. Pier Luigi Bersani was elected secretary and most Veltroniani joined AreaDem, the united minority faction led by Franceschini. However, when Franceschini re-approached with Bersani, Veltroni formed a "movement" to defend the "original spirit" of the PD. In doing this he was supported by 75 deputies: 33 Veltroniani, 35 Populars close to Giuseppe Fioroni and 7 former Rutelliani led by Paolo Gentiloni. The new faction was named Democratic Movement.
