= Democrats in Network =

Political faction in Italy

Democrats in Network (Democratici in Rete, DiR) were a social-democratic faction within the Democratic Party (PD), a political party in Italy.

After the departure of Veltroni from party leadership in February 2009, Veltroniani talked about organizing their faction, but finally there was a split between the staunch supporters of the new leader Dario Franceschini and those who soon started to criticize him. The latter, led by Goffredo Bettini and Michele Meta, who were mainly social democrats coming from the Italian Communist Party launched Democrats in Network.

In the 2009 Democratic Party leadership election the faction supported Ignazio Marino, whose campaign was coordinated by Meta, differently from Veltroni himself and most Veltroniani who supported Dario Franceschini. Some time after the election, the faction was disbanded. By 2011 Meta and others joined Change Italy, a new association led by Marino, while Bettini launched Beyond the Parties and became very close to Nicola Zingaretti instead.
