= LeftDem =

LeftDem SinistraDem
- Leader: Gianni Cuperlo
- Ideology: Democratic socialism Social democracy
- Political position: Left-wing

LeftDem (Italian: SinistraDem), whose complete name is LeftDem – Open Field (SinistraDem – Campo Aperto), is a social-democratic faction within the Democratic Party (PD), a political party in Italy.

== History ==
The faction was launched by Gianni Cuperlo, who lost the 2013 leadership election to Matteo Renzi, in June 2014, as an association open to Democrats, independents and members of other parties. In the following October the faction's assembly saw the participation, among others, of Sergio Cofferati and Stefano Fassina, who later left the party.

In the run-up of the 2017 leadership election, LeftDem endorsed Andrea Orlando of Remake Italy for party leader.

In the run-up of the 2023 Democratic Party (Italy) leadership election the fraction supports Gianni Cuperlo's second bid for the job.
