= Remake Italy =

Remake Italy Rifare l'Italia
- Leaders: Matteo Orfini; Andrea Orlando; Roberto Gualtieri
- Founded: 2010
- Registered: 2011
- Dissolved: 2017
- Ideology: Social democracy Democratic socialism
- Political position: Left-wing

Remake Italy (Italian: Rifare l'Italia), whose members were known as Young Turks (Giovani turchi), was a social-democratic and, to some extent, democratic-socialist faction within the Democratic Party (PD), a political party in Italy.

Prominent members included Matteo Orfini, Stefano Fassina, Andrea Orlando, Maurizio Martina, Roberto Gualtieri, Francesco Verducci and Fausto Raciti. The faction's leader, Orfini, was elected president of the PD in June 2014.

== History ==
The group was originally formed in 2010, but became an effective faction only with the formation of the association named "Remake Italy" in 2011. Mostly former Democrats of the Left, young Dalemiani and anti-New Labour social-democrats, the Young Turks opposed Mario Monti's government and the rise within the party of Matteo Renzi, a reformer who was the darling of PD's liberals. They were thus supporters of Pier Luigi Bersani during his four years as party leader (2009–2013): Orfini and Fassina were members of his political secretariat, while Orlando was the party's spokesperson.

After the 2013 general election in which 4.5% of Democratic deputies and senators were affiliated to the faction, and its aftermath, the Young Turks were disappointed by Bersani and, motivated by a generational drive, started to approach Renzi. During the 2013 leadership election they supported Gianni Cuperlo, but since 2014 started to support Renzi.

In February 2014 Renzi appointed Orlando and Martina ministers in his government, respectively at Justice and Agriculture, while in June Orfini was elected president of the party on Renzi's proposal. The faction continued to exist under the leadership of Orfini, while Orlando, Martina and Fassina were less involved or distanced from it: Orlando focused on his high-profile government job, Martina was a founding member of Left is Change, and Fassina left the party altogether.

In the run-up of the 2017 leadership election, Orlando decided to challenge Renzi. Most of the faction followed him, while Orfini supported Renzi, along with the majority of Martina's Left is Change faction (Martina was candidate for deputy secretary). Orlando was notably endorsed by Luciano Violante and Nicola Zingaretti, as well as Cesare Damiano and Anna Finocchiaro (minority of Left is Change). After Renzi's re-election, Remake Italy was disbanded: Orfini continued to be the editor of Left Wing, a political journal whose circle could be considered his new faction, while Orlando launched his own association, Democracy Europe Society (DEmS). Also Left is Change was disbanded: Martina's followers formed Future! European Democrats, while those of Damiano re-organised themselves as the Dem Labourites.
