= Bersaniani =

Bersaniani referred to the followers of Pier Luigi Bersani, a former secretary of the Democratic Party, a political party in Italy.

The Bersaniani, who were formerly affiliated with the Dalemiani (the followers of Massimo D'Alema), represented traditional social democracy within the party and have their power base in the "red" regions, mainly Emilia-Romagna and Tuscany. Since his election as secretary, Bersani gained autonomy from D'Alema, but they are still close allies. Bersani's main supporters include Maurizio Migliavacca, Virginio Merola, Vasco Errani, Enrico Rossi, Nicola Zingaretti, Stefano Fassina, Andrea Orlando and Matteo Orfini.
