= AreaDem =

- Leader: Dario Franceschini
- Other members: Marina Sereni
- Founded: 2009
- Ideology: Christian left Social liberalism Social democracy (minority)
- Political position: Centre to centre-left

AreaDem (an abbreviation for Area Democratica, English: Democratic Area) is a broad faction within the Democratic Party (PD), a political party in Italy. The faction coordinator is Marina Sereni, a former member of the Democrats of the Left close to Piero Fassino.

On the issues, AD distances itself from social democracy, opposes any "compromise over legality" and justice with Silvio Berlusconi, and supports voters' participation to the life of the party through primaries.

== History ==
The grouping was launched soon after the defeat of Franceschini, party leader since the resignation of Walter Veltroni, by Pier Luigi Bersani in the 2009 PD leadership election and at its foundation comprised almost 150 MPs and MEPs of the party. AD served as board of coordination between the six main sub-groups which supported Franceschini's bid: Veltroniani, Fassiniani, Populars/Fourth Phase, Simply Democrats, Liberal PD and Democratic Ecologists.

In February 2010, there was a clash between Veltroniani and Franceschiniani over the choice of the candidate for President in Umbria. The friction was resolved, but Veltroni chose to launch a think tank named Democratica that could eventually become a new faction. In April the faction held an assembly in Cortona, attended also by Veltroni, Fassino, Franco Marini and Giuseppe Fioroni, during which Franceschini spoke openly of a possible separation from the party if it does not stick back to its original nature of a broad centre-left party committed to primaries.

By September 2010, both Franceschini and Fassino had re-approached with Bersani, a move which was not approved by Veltroni and Fioroni. The latter formed Democratic Movement to defend the "original spirit" of the PD. In doing this they were supported by 75 deputies: 33 Veltroniani, 35 Populars close to Fioroni and 7 former Rutelliani led by Paolo Gentiloni. During a meeting of the party's national board, held on 23 September, Franceschiniani and Fassiniani voted a motion proposed by Bersani (thus entering the party's majority), while most Veltroniani abstained from the vote: the resolution was passed by a landslide. It was the end of AD, as Franceschini soon acknowledged. The faction continued to be active within the party majority.
