= Democratic Space =

Political faction in Italy

Democratic Space (Spazio Democratico, SD) is a Christian-democratic faction within the Democratic Party (PD), a political party in Italy.

It was launched in February 2015 by a group of leading Christian democrats, mainly Christian leftists in the tradition of Giuseppe Dossetti and Giorgio La Pira, who supported Matteo Renzi's leadership. They notably included Graziano Delrio, Lorenzo Guerini, Matteo Richetti and Angelo Rughetti.
