= Francesco Bonifazi =

Italian politician

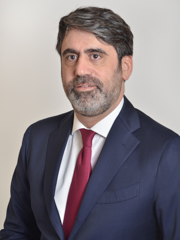

Personal details
- Born: June 24, 1976 (age 50) Florence
- Party: Democratic Party (Italy)
- Education: University of Florence

Francesco Bonifazi (Florence, 24 June 1976) is an Italian politician, senator elected with the Democratic Party in the 2018 general elections, before moving on to Matteo Renzi's Italia Viva in 2019.

== Early life and education ==
Bonifazi was born on June 24, 1976, in Florence, where he still lives. His father Franco was for years director of the Tuscan Mukki milk plant, while his uncle, Alberto Bruschini, was a member of the general deputation of Banca Monte dei Paschi di Siena and director of the Cassa di Risparmio di Prato.

In 2003, he graduated in law from the University of Florence, obtaining a master's degree in tax law from the University of Siena in 2004 and becoming a lawyer of the Court of Florence in 2006 with a specialization in tax law. Furthermore, he worked at Umberto Tombari's law firm in Florence, and in 2009 he opens the BL law firm in Florence.

== Political Activity ==
He took his first steps in politics at the end of the 90s with the Democrats of the Left, being elected councilor of District 3 of Florence in the local elections of 1999, where he was first president of the territory until 2000 and then leader of the DS councilors until 2004.

Between 2004 and 2007, he was coordinator of the DS of District 3 in Florence and then of the newly formed Democratic Party, while from 2008 to 2009 he was secretary of the PD club of Vie Nuove.

In 2008, during the center-left primaries to choose the candidate for mayor of Florence in the 2009 administrative elections, he was head of the electoral staff of Michele Ventura, deputy group leader of the Democratic Party in the Chamber, candidate from the Dalemia area of the party.

=== Matteo Renzi government ===
After the election of Matteo Renzi, president of the Province of Florence, in the center-left primaries and becoming a mayor, Bonifazi approached his political area which he initially distrusted. In the 2009 administrative elections he is a candidate for the city council of Florence, and elected from the ranks of the Democratic Party, becoming its group leader in Palazzo Vecchio under the administration of Renzi.

In 2012, he supported Renzi's candidacy in the primary elections of the centre-left Italia. Bene Comune for the choice of the leader of the centre-left coalition and candidate for the Prime Minister.

== Judicial affairs ==
In September 2018, Bonifazi ended up under investigation by the Rome Public Prosecutor's Office on charges of illicit financing and issuing invoices for non-existent operations, as part of the investigation into payments to the politician of the entrepreneur Luca Parnasi through his company Pentapigna. Pentapigna was arrested months before the affair of the AS Roma stadium, which allegedly paid €150,000 to the "Eyu" foundation, chaired at the time by Bonifazi. Money actually intended for the Democratic Party but was not entered correctly in the balance sheets. In November 2021, he was indicted, together with twelve other people (including Parnasi, the deputy and treasurer of the Lega Giulio Centemero and the former president of the Capitoline M5S Assembly Marcello De Vito) by the GUP Annalisa Marzano.
