= Arturo Parisi =

Italian politician (born 1940)

Arturo Mario Luigi Parisi
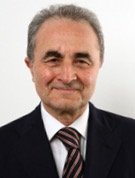

Minister of Defence
- In office 17 May 2006 – 8 May 2008
- Prime Minister: Romano Prodi
- Preceded by: Antonio Martino
- Succeeded by: Ignazio La Russa

Personal details
- Born: 13 September 1940 (age 86) San Mango Piemonte, Kingdom of Italy
- Party: PD (since 2007); DL (2002–2007); Dem (1999–2002)
- Other political affiliations: The Olive Tree (1995–2007)
- Education: University of Sassari

Arturo Parisi (born 13 September 1940) is an Italian politician, leader of the Ulivist faction of the Democratic Party and a four-time member of the Italian Chamber of Deputies. He was also minister of defence in the cabinet of Prime Minister Romano Prodi from 2006 to 2008.

== Biography ==
Parisi was born in San Mango Piemonte, Salerno, Campania on 13 September 1940. He moved soon with his family to Sassari, Sardinia. A strong supporter of Romano Prodi, in 1995 he founded, with him, the Olive Tree coalition, and on 30 November 1999 he won a by-election to replace him in the Italian Chamber of Deputies. He also succeeded Prodi as president of The Democrats from 1999 to 2002, when the party was dissolved. He then became president of the Federal Assembly of the new Daisy party, and was re-elected to the Chamber in the 2001 general election.

After being re-elected Deputy in the 2006 general election, he was appointed Minister of Defence in the cabinet of Prime Minister Romano Prodi, a position he retained until 2008 when the governing Union coalition crumbled and new elections were called. Meanwhile, Parisi joined the new Democratic Party, formed in 2007 from the merger of the Daisy and the Democrats of the Left, as leader of the Olivists' faction. On 22 April 2008 he was elected deputy for the fourth time.

After the resignation of party secretary Walter Veltroni, the Constituent Assembly of the Democratic Party convened on 21 February 2009 to elect a new leader. Parisi, Enrico Morando and Stefano Ceccanti presented a motion asking for the immediate calling of primary elections open to all members of the party. The motion was rejected, so the Assembly itself had to vote for the new secretary. Parisi ran for the post against former deputy secretary Dario Franceschini but obtained 92 votes out of 1,258.
