= Reformist Base =

Reformist Base Base Riformista
- Leaders: Luca Lotti; Lorenzo Guerini
- Founded: May 2019
- Ideology: Reformism; Liberalism; Christian left
- Political position: Centre to centre-left

Reformist Base (Italian: Base Riformista, BR) is a liberal-democratic, centrist and Christian left faction within the Democratic Party (PD), a political party in Italy. Its leaders are Luca Lotti and Lorenzo Guerini, close advisors of Matteo Renzi, party's former national secretary and former Prime Minister of Italy from February 2014 to December 2016. It is one of the main faction within PD's parliamentary groups.

On 17 September, during an interview to Italian newspaper la Repubblica, Renzi announced his intention to leave the PD, and create new parliamentary groups led by himself. On the same day, interviewed by Bruno Vespa during the late-night TV talk-show Porta a Porta, he officially launched Italia Viva (IV). Renzi was followed by 25 deputies and 12 senators, who left the PD to join his movement, however all the members of Reformist Base, including its leaders Guerini and Lotti, decided not to join the new movement, remaining within the PD.
