= Democratic Party (Italy) =

Italian centre-left political party

Democratic Party Partito Democratico
- Abbreviation: PD
- Secretary: Elly Schlein
- President: Stefano Bonaccini
- Founded: 14 October 2007; 19 years ago
- Merger of: Democrats of the Left; The Daisy; minor parties
- Headquarters: Via Sant'Andrea delle Fratte 16 (Largo del Nazareno), Rome
- Newspaper: l'Unità (2007–2014); Europa (2007–2014); Democratica (2017–2019); Immagina (2020–2023)
- Youth wing: Young Democrats
- Membership (2024): ▲165,000
- Ideology: Social democracy
- Political position: Centre-left
- National affiliation: Centre-left coalition
- European affiliation: Party of European Socialists
- European Parliament group: Progressive Alliance of Socialists and Democrats
- International affiliation: Progressive Alliance
- Parliamentary group: PD–IDP
- Colours: Red Green
- Chamber of Deputies: 68 / 400
- Senate: 36 / 205
- European Parliament: 19 / 76
- Regional Councils: 204 / 896
- Conference of Regions: 3 / 21

Website
- partitodemocratico.it

The Democratic Party (Italian: Partito Democratico, PD) is a centre-left, social-democratic political party in Italy, led by Elly Schlein as secretary and Stefano Bonaccini as president. Since its foundation, it has been the main centre-left force in the country, and it is currently one of Italy's two major parties, opposing Brothers of Italy.

The PD was established in 2007 upon the merger of various centre-left parties which had been part of The Olive Tree list in the 2006 Italian general election, mainly the social-democratic Democrats of the Left (DS), successor of the Italian Communist Party and the Democratic Party of the Left, which was folded with several social-democratic parties (Labour Federation and Social Christians, among others) in 1998, as well as the largely Catholic-inspired Democracy is Freedom – The Daisy (DL), a merger of the Italian People's Party (heir of the Christian Democracy party's left-wing), The Democrats and Italian Renewal in 2002. While the party has also been influenced by Christian left, social liberalism and Third Way, especially under Matteo Renzi's leadership, the PD moved closer to the centre. Under latter leaders, especially Schlein, who was elected in the 2023 leadership election despite party members' preference for Bonaccini and whose upbringing is influenced by the left-wing, environmentalism and green politics, the party has tilted left.

Between 2013 and 2018 the Council of Ministers was led by three successive prime ministers of Italy from the PD, namely Letta (2013–2014), Renzi (2014–2016) and Paolo Gentiloni (2016–2018). The PD was the second-largest party in the 2018 Italian general election, where the centre-left coalition came third. The party was returned to government in September 2019 with the Conte II Cabinet, as junior partner of the Five Star Movement, and joined the national unity Draghi Cabinet, comprising also the League and Forza Italia, in February 2021. In the 2022 Italian general election, the PD-led coalition achieved similar results to 2018 and returned to the opposition.

Prominent Democrats include former leaders Walter Veltroni, Dario Franceschini, Nicola Zingaretti and Enrico Letta. Former members have included Giorgio Napolitano (President of Italy, 2006–2015), Sergio Mattarella (President of Italy, 2015–present) and four Prime Ministers (Romano Prodi, Giuliano Amato, Massimo D'Alema and Renzi). As of 2025, three regions out of 20 (Emilia-Romagna, Tuscany and Apulia) have Democratic presidents, while in three more regions (Umbria, Campania and Sardinia) the PD is part of the governing coalition.

== History ==
=== Background: The Olive Tree ===
In the early 1990s a process was started, aimed at uniting left-wing and centre-left forces into a single political entity. This followed the Tangentopoli corruption scandals, the end of the so-called First Republic and the transformation of the Italian Communist Party (PCI) into the Democratic Party of the Left (PDS).

In 1995 Romano Prodi, a former minister of Industry on behalf of the left-wing faction of Christian Democracy (DC), entered politics and founded The Olive Tree (L'Ulivo), a centre-left coalition including the PDS, the Italian People's Party (PPI), the Federation of the Greens (FdV), Italian Renewal (RI), the Italian Socialists (SI) and Democratic Union (UD). The coalition in alliance with the Communist Refoundation Party (PRC) won the 1996 general election and Prodi became prime minister.

In February 1998 the PDS merged with minor social democratic parties (Labour Federation and Social Christians, among others) to become the Democrats of the Left (DS), while in March 2002 the PPI, RI and The Democrats (Prodi's own party, launched in 1999) became Democracy is Freedom – The Daisy (DL). In the summer of 2003, Prodi suggested that centre-left forces should participate in the 2004 European Parliament election with a common list. Whereas the Union of Democrats for Europe (UDEUR) and the far-left parties refused, four parties accepted, namely the DS, DL, the Italian Democratic Socialists (SDI) and the European Republicans Movement (MRE). These launched a joint list named United in the Olive Tree which ran in the election and garnered 31.1% of the vote. The project was later abandoned in 2005 by the SDI.

In the 2006 general election the list obtained 31.3% of the vote for the Chamber of Deputies.

=== Road to the Democratic Party ===
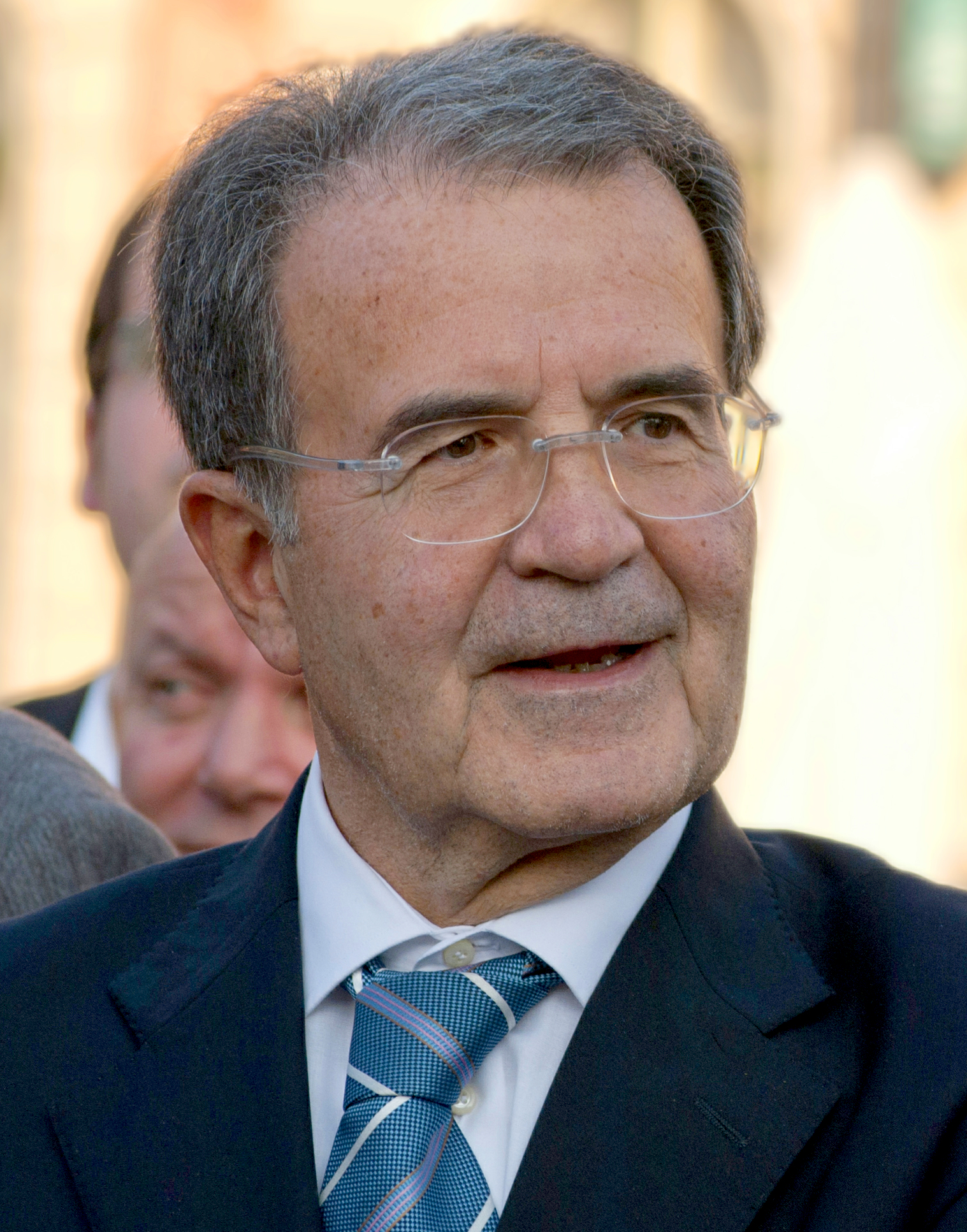
Romano Prodi

The project of a Democratic Party was often mentioned by Prodi as the natural evolution of The Olive Tree and was bluntly envisioned by Michele Salvati, a former centrist deputy of the DS, in an appeal in Il Foglio newspaper in April 2013. The term Partito Democratico was used for the first time in a formal context by the DL and DS members of the Regional Council of Veneto, who chose to form a joint group named The Olive Tree – Venetian Democratic Party (L'Ulivo – Partito Democratico Veneto) in March 2007.

The 2006 election result, anticipated by the 2005 primary election in which over four million voters endorsed Prodi as candidate for prime minister, gave a push to the project of a unified centre-left party. Eight parties agreed to merge into the PD:

- Democrats of the Left (DS, social democratic, leader: Piero Fassino)
- Democracy is Freedom – The Daisy (DL, centrist, leader: Francesco Rutelli).
- Southern Democratic Party (PDM, centrist, leader: Agazio Loiero);
- Sardinia Project (PS, social democratic, leader: Renato Soru);
- European Republicans Movement (MRE, social-liberal, leader: Luciana Sbarbati);
- Democratic Republicans (RD, social-liberal, leader: Giuseppe Ossorio);
- Middle Italy (IdM, centrist, leader: Marco Follini);
- Reformist Alliance (AR, social democratic, leader: Ottaviano Del Turco).

While the DL agreed to the merger with virtually no resistance, the DS experienced a more heated final congress. On 19 April 2007, approximately 75% of party members voted in support of the merger of the DS into the PD. The left-wing opposition, led by Fabio Mussi, obtained just 15% of the support within the party. A third motion, presented by Gavino Angius and supportive of the PD only within the Party of European Socialists (PES), obtained 10% of the vote. Both Mussi and Angius refused to join the PD and, following the congress, founded a new party called Democratic Left (SD).

On 22 May 2007 the organising committee of the nascent party was formed. It consisted of 45 members, mainly politicians from the two aforementioned major parties and the leaders of the other six minor parties. Also leading external figures such as Giuliano Amato, Marcello De Cecco, Gad Lerner, Carlo Petrini and Tullia Zevi were included. On 18 June, the committee decided the rules for the open election of the 2,400 members of the party's constituent assembly; each voter could choose between a number of lists, each of them associated with a candidate for secretary.

=== Foundation and leadership election ===
All candidates interested in running for the PD leadership had to be associated with one of the founding parties and present at least 2,000 valid signatures by 30 July 2007. A total of ten candidates officially registered their candidacy: Walter Veltroni, Rosy Bindi, Enrico Letta, Furio Colombo, Marco Pannella, Antonio Di Pietro, Mario Adinolfi, Pier Giorgio Gawronski, Jacopo Schettini, Lucio Cangini and Amerigo Rutigliano. Of these, Pannella and Di Pietro were rejected because of their involvement in external parties (the Radicals and Italy of Values respectively) whereas Cangini and Rutigliano did not manage to present the necessary 2,000 valid signatures for the 9 pm deadline and Colombo's candidacy was instead made into hiatus to give him 48 additional hours to integrate the required documentation. Colombo later decided to retire his candidacy citing his impossibility to fit with all the requirements. All rejected candidates had the chance against the decision in 48 hours' time, with Pannella and Rutigliano being the only two candidates to appeal. Both were rejected on 3 August.

On 14 October 2007 Veltroni was elected leader with about 75% of the national votes in an open primary attended by over three million voters. Veltroni was proclaimed secretary during a party's constituent assembly held in Milan on 28 October 2007.

On 21 November the new logo was unveiled. It depicts an olive branch and the acronym PD in colours reminiscent of the Italian tricolour flag (green, white and red). In the words of Ermete Realacci, green represents the ecologist and social-liberal cultures, white the Catholic solidarity and red the socialist and social democratic traditions. The green-white-red idea was coined by Schettini during his campaign.

=== Leadership of Walter Veltroni ===
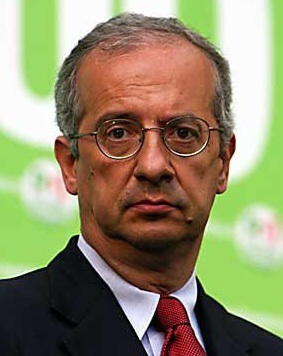
Walter Veltroni

After the premature fall of the Prodi II Cabinet in January 2008, the PD decided to form a less diverse coalition. The party invited the Radicals and the Socialist Party (PS) to join its lists, but only the Radicals accepted and formed an alliance with Italy of Values (IdV) which was set to join the PD after the election. The PD included many notable candidates and new faces in its lists and Walter Veltroni, who tried to present the PD as the party of the renewal in contrast both with Silvio Berlusconi and the previous centre-left government, ran an intense and modern campaign which led him to visit all provinces of Italy, but that was not enough.

In the 2008 general election on 13–14 April 2008, the PD–IdV coalition won 37.5% of the vote and was defeated by the centre-right coalition, composed of The People of Freedom (PdL), the Lega Nord and the Movement for Autonomy (46.8%). The PD was able to absorb some votes from the parties of the far-left as also IdV did, but lost voters to the Union of the Centre (UdC), ending up with 33.2% of the vote, 217 deputies and 119 senators. After the election Veltroni, who was gratified by the result, formed a shadow cabinet. IdV, excited by its 4.4% which made it the fourth largest party in Parliament, refused to join both the Democratic groups and the shadow cabinet.

The early months after the election were a difficult time for the PD and Veltroni, whose leadership was weakened by the growing influence of internal factions because of the popularity of Berlusconi and the dramatic rise of IdV in opinion polls. IdV became a strong competitor of the PD and the relations between the two parties became tense. In the 2008 Abruzzo regional election, the PD was forced to support IdV candidate Carlo Costantini. In October, Veltroni, who distanced from Di Pietro many times, declared that "on some issues he [Di Pietro] is distant from the democratic language of the centre-left".

=== Leadership of Dario Franceschini ===
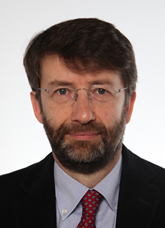
Dario Franceschini

After a crushing defeat in the February 2009 Sardinian regional election, Walter Veltroni resigned as party secretary. His deputy Dario Franceschini took over as interim party secretary to guide the party toward the selection of a new stable leader. Franceschini was elected by the party's national assembly with 1,047 votes out of 1,258. His only opponent Arturo Parisi won a mere 92 votes. Franceschini was the first former Christian Democrat to lead the party.

The 2009 European Parliament election was an important test for the PD. Prior to the election, the PD considered offering hospitality to the Socialist Party (PS) and the Greens in its lists, and proposed a similar pact to Democratic Left (SD). However, the Socialists, the Greens and Democratic Left decided instead to contest the election together as a new alliance called Left and Freedom which failed to achieve the 4% threshold required to return any MEPs, but damaged the PD, which gained 26.1% of the vote, returning 21 MEPs.

=== Leadership of Pier Luigi Bersani ===
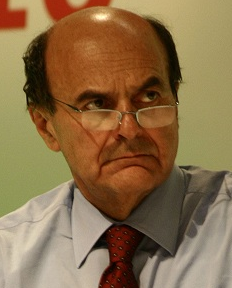
Pier Luigi Bersani

The national convention and a subsequent open primary were called for October, with Franceschini, Pier Luigi Bersani and Ignazio Marino were running for the leadership, while a fourth candidate, Rutigliano, was excluded because of lack of signatures. In local conventions, a 56.4% of party members voted and Bersani was by far the most voted candidate with 55.1% of the vote, largely ahead of Franceschini (37.0%) and Marino (7.9%). Three million people participated in the open primary on 25 October 2009; Bersani was elected new secretary of the party with about 53% of the vote, ahead of Franceschini with 34% and Marino with 13%. On 7 November, during the first meeting of the new national assembly, Bersani was declared secretary, Rosy Bindi was elected party president (with Marina Sereni and Ivan Scalfarotto vice presidents), Enrico Letta deputy secretary and Antonio Misiani treasurer.

In reaction to the election of Bersani, perceived by some moderates as an old-style social democrat, Francesco Rutelli (a long-time critic of the party's course) and other centrists and liberals within the PD left to form a new centrist party, named Alliance for Italy (ApI). Following March 2009, and especially after Bersani's victory, many deputies, senators, one MEP and several regional/local councillors left the party to join the UdC, ApI and other minor parties. They included many Rutelliani and most Teodems.

In March 2010, a big round of regional elections, involving eleven regions, took place. The PD lost four regions to the centre-right (Piedmont, Lazio, Campania and Calabria), and maintained its hold on six (Liguria, Emilia-Romagna, Tuscany, Marche, Umbria and Basilicata), plus Apulia, a traditionally conservative region where due to divisions within the centre-right Nichi Vendola of SEL was re-elected with the PD's support.

In September 2011, Bersani was invited by Antonio Di Pietro's IdV to take part to its annual late summer convention in Vasto, Abruzzo. Bersani, who had been accused by Di Pietro of avoiding him to court the centre-right UdC, proposed the formation of a New Olive Tree coalition comprising the PD, IdV and SEL. The three party leaders agreed in what was soon dubbed the pact of Vasto. The pact was broken after the resignation of Silvio Berlusconi as Prime Minister in November 2011, as the PD gave external support to Mario Monti's technocratic government, along with the PdL and the UdC.

==== Road to the 2013 general election ====
A year after the pact of Vasto, the relations between the PD and IdV had become tense. IdV and its leader, Antonio Di Pietro, were thus excluded from the coalition talks led by Bersani. To these talks were instead invited SEL led by Nichi Vendola and the Italian Socialist Party (PSI) led by Riccardo Nencini. The talks resulted on 13 October 2012 in the Pact of Democrats and Progressives (later known as Italy. Common Good) and produced the rules for the upcoming centre-left primary election, during which the PD–SEL–PSI joint candidate for prime minister in the 2013 general election would be selected.

In the primary, the strongest challenge to Bersani was posed by a fellow Democrat, the 37-year-old mayor of Florence Matteo Renzi, a liberal moderniser, who had officially launched his leadership bid on 13 September 2012 in Verona, Veneto. Bersani launched his own bid on 14 October in his hometown Bettola, north-western Emilia. Other candidates included Nichi Vendola (SEL), Bruno Tabacci (ApI) and Laura Puppato (PD).

In the 2012 regional election, Rosario Crocetta (member of the PD) was elected president with 30.5% of the vote thanks to the support of the UdC, but the coalition failed to secure an outright majority in the Regional Assembly. For the first time in 50 years, a left-wing politician had the chance to govern Sicily.

On 25 November, Bersani came ahead in the first round of the primary election with 44.9% of the vote, Renzi came second with 35.5%, followed by Vendola (15.6%), Puppato (2.6%) and Tabacci (1.4%). Bersani did better in the South while Renzi prevailed in Tuscany, Umbria and Marche. In the subsequent run-off, on 2 December, Bersani trounced Renzi 60.9% to 39.1% by winning in each and every single region but Tuscany, where Renzi won 54.9% of the vote. The PD secretary did particularly well in Lazio (67.8%), Campania (69.4%), Apulia (71.4%), Basilicata (71.7%), Calabria (74.4%), Sicily (66.5%) and Sardinia (73.5%).

==== 2013 general election ====
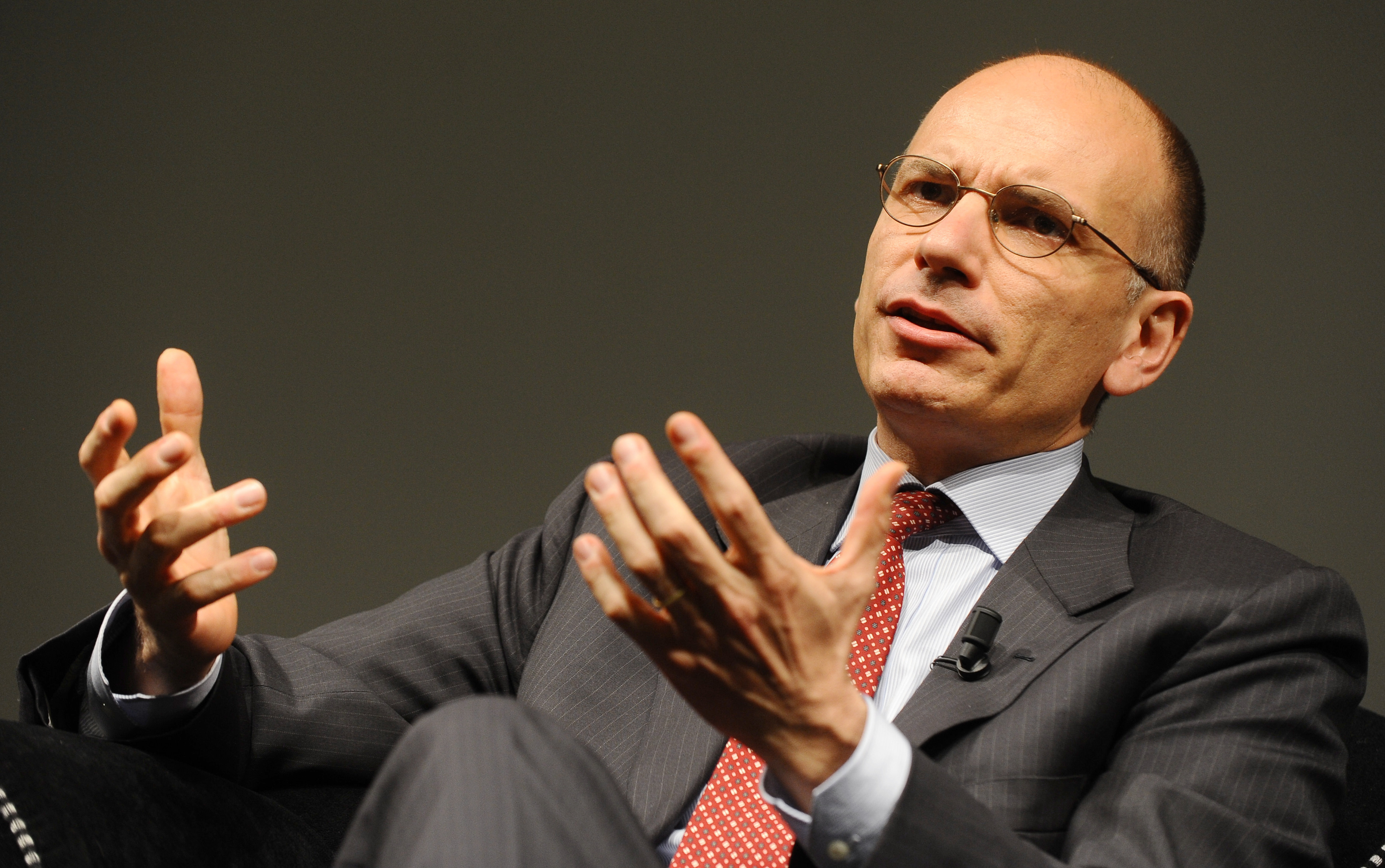
Enrico Letta in 2013

In the election, the PD and its coalition fared much worse than expected and according to pollsters predictions. The PD won just 25.4% of the vote for the Chamber of Deputies (−8.0% from 2008) and the centre-left coalition narrowly won the majority in the house over the centre-right coalition (29.5% to 29.3%). Even worse, in the Senate the PD and its allies failed to get an outright majority due to the rise of the Five Star Movement (M5S) and the centre-right's victory in key regions such as Lombardy, Veneto, Campania, Apulia, Calabria and Sicily (the centre-right was awarded of the majority premium in those regions, leaving the centre-left with just a handful of elects there). Consequently, the PD-led coalition was unable to govern alone because it lacked a majority in the Senate which has equal power to the Chamber. As a result, Bersani, who refused any agreement with the PdL and was rejected by the M5S, failed to form a government.

After an agreement with the centre-right parties, Bersani put forward Franco Marini as his party's candidate for President to succeed to Giorgio Napolitano on 17 April. However, Renzi, several Democratic delegates and SEL did not support Marini. On 18 April, Marini received just 521 votes in the first ballot, short of the 672 needed, as more than 200 centre-left delegates rebelled. On 19 April, the PD and SEL selected Romano Prodi to be their candidate in the fourth ballot. Despite his candidacy had received unanimous support among the two parties' delegates, Prodi obtained only 395 votes in the fourth ballot as more than 100 centre-left electors did not vote for him. After the vote, Prodi pulled out of the race and Bersani resigned as party secretary. Bindi, the party's president, also resigned. The day after, Napolitano accepted to stand again for election and was re-elected President with the support of most parliamentary parties.

On 28 April, Enrico Letta, the party's deputy secretary and former Christian Democrat, was sworn in as Prime Minister of Italy at the head of a government based around a grand coalition including the PdL, Civic Choice (SC) and the UdC. Letta was the first Democrat to become prime minister.

=== Leadership of Guglielmo Epifani ===
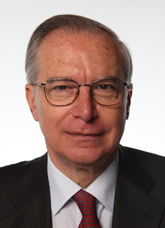
Guglielmo Epifani

After Bersani's resignation from party secretary on 20 April 2013, the PD remained without a leader for two weeks. On 11 May 2013, Guglielmo Epifani was elected secretary at the national assembly of the party with 85.8% of vote. Epifani, secretary-general of the Italian General Confederation of Labour (CGIL), Italy's largest trade union, from 2002 to 2010, was the first former Socialist to lead the party. Epifani's mission was to lead the party toward a national convention in October.

A few weeks after Epifani's election as secretary, the PD had a success in the 2013 local elections, winning in 69 comuni (including Rome and all the other 14 provincial capitals up for election) while the PdL won 22 and the M5S 1.

The decision, on 9 November, that the PD would organise the next congress of the Party of European Socialists (PES) in Rome in early 2014, sparked protests among some of the party's Christian democrats, who opposed PES membership.

Epifani was little more than a secretary pro tempore and in fact frequently repeated that he was not going to run for a full term as secretary in the leadership race that would take place in late 2013, saying that his candidacy would be a betrayal of his mandate.

=== Leadership of Matteo Renzi ===
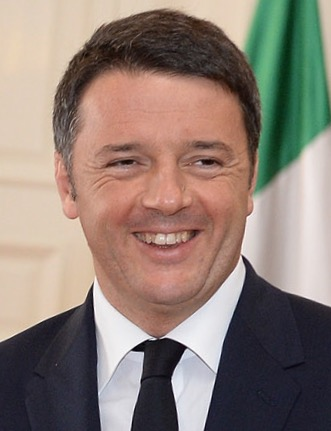
Matteo Renzi

Four individuals filed their bid for becoming secretary, namely Matteo Renzi, Pippo Civati, Gianni Cuperlo and Gianni Pittella. The leadership race started with voting by party members in local conventions (7–17 November). Renzi came first with 45.3%, followed by Cuperlo (39.4%), Civati (9.4%) and Pittella (5.8%). The first three were admitted to the open primary.

On 8 December, Renzi, who won in all regions but was stronger in the Centre-North, trounced his opponents with 67.6% of the vote. Cuperlo, whose support was higher in the South, came second with 18.2% while Civati, whose message did well with northern urban and progressive voters, came third with 14.2%. On 15 December, Renzi, whose executive included many young people and a majority of women, was proclaimed secretary by the party's national assembly while Cuperlo was elected president as proposed by Renzi.

On 20 January 2014, Cuperlo criticised the electoral reform proposed by Renzi in agreement with Berlusconi, but the proposal was overwhelmingly approved by the party's national board. The day after the vote, Cuperlo resigned from president. He was later replaced by Matteo Orfini, who hailed from the party's left wing, but since then became more and more supportive of Renzi.

After frequent calls by Renzi for a new phase, the national board decided to put an end to Letta's government on 13 February and form a new one led by Renzi as the latter had proposed. Subsequently, Renzi was sworn in as prime minister on 22 February at the head of an identical coalition. On 28 February, the PD officially joined the PES as a full member, ending a decade-long debate.

==== Premiership of Matteo Renzi ====
In the 2014 European Parliament election, the party obtained 40.8% of the vote and 31 seats. The party's score was virtually 15 percentage points up from five years before and the best result for an Italian party in a nationwide election since the 1958 general election, when Christian Democracy won 42.4%. The PD was also the largest national party within the Parliament in its 8th term. Following his party's success, Renzi was able to secure the post of High Representative of the Union for Foreign Affairs and Security Policy within the European Commission for Federica Mogherini, his minister of Foreign Affairs.

In January 2015, Sergio Mattarella, a veteran left-wing Christian Democrat and founding member of the PD, whose candidacy had been proposed by Renzi and unanimously endorsed by the party's delegates, was elected President of Italy during a presidential election triggered by President Giorgio Napolitano's resignation.

During Renzi's first year as prime minister, several MPs defected from other parties to join the PD. They comprised splinters from SEL (most of whom led by Gennaro Migliore, see Freedom and Rights), SC (notably including Stefania Giannini, Pietro Ichino and Andrea Romano) and the M5S. Consequently, the party increased its parliamentary numbers to 311 deputies and 114 senators by April 2015. Otherwise, Sergio Cofferati, Giuseppe Civati and Stefano Fassina left. They were the first and most notable splinters among the ranks of the party's internal left, but several others followed either Civati (who launched Possible) or Fassina (who launched Future to the Left and Italian Left) in the following months. By May 2016, the PD's parliamentary numbers had gone down to 303 deputies and 114 senators.

In the 2015 regional elections, Democratic presidents were elected (or re-elected) in five regions out of seven, namely Enrico Rossi in Tuscany, Luca Ceriscioli in Marche, Catiuscia Marini in Umbria, Vincenzo De Luca in Campania and Michele Emiliano in Apulia. As a result, 16 regions out of 20, including all those of central and southern Italy, were governed by the centre-left while the opposition Lega Nord led Veneto and Lombardy and propped up a centre-right government in Liguria.

==== Road to the 2018 general election ====
After a huge defeat in the 2016 constitutional referendum (59.9% no, 40.1% yes), Renzi resigned as prime minister in December 2016 and was replaced by fellow Democrat Paolo Gentiloni, whose government's composition and coalition were very similar to those of the Renzi Cabinet. In February 2017, Renzi resigned also as PD secretary to run in the 2017 leadership election. Renzi, Andrea Orlando (one of the leaders of the Remake Italy faction; the other leader Matteo Orfini was the party's president and supported Renzi) and Michele Emiliano were the three contenders for the party's leadership.

Subsequently, a substantial group of leftists (24 deputies, 14 senators and 3 MEPs), led by Enrico Rossi (Democratic Socialists) and Roberto Speranza (Reformist Area), backed by Massimo D'Alema, Pier Luigi Bersani and Guglielmo Epifani, left the PD and formed Article 1 – Democratic and Progressive Movement (MDP), along with splinters from the Italian Left (SI) led by Arturo Scotto. Most of the splinters as well as Scotto were former Democrats of the Left. In December 2017, the MDP, SI and Possible would launch Free and Equal (LeU) under the leadership of the President of the Senate Pietro Grasso (another PD splinter).

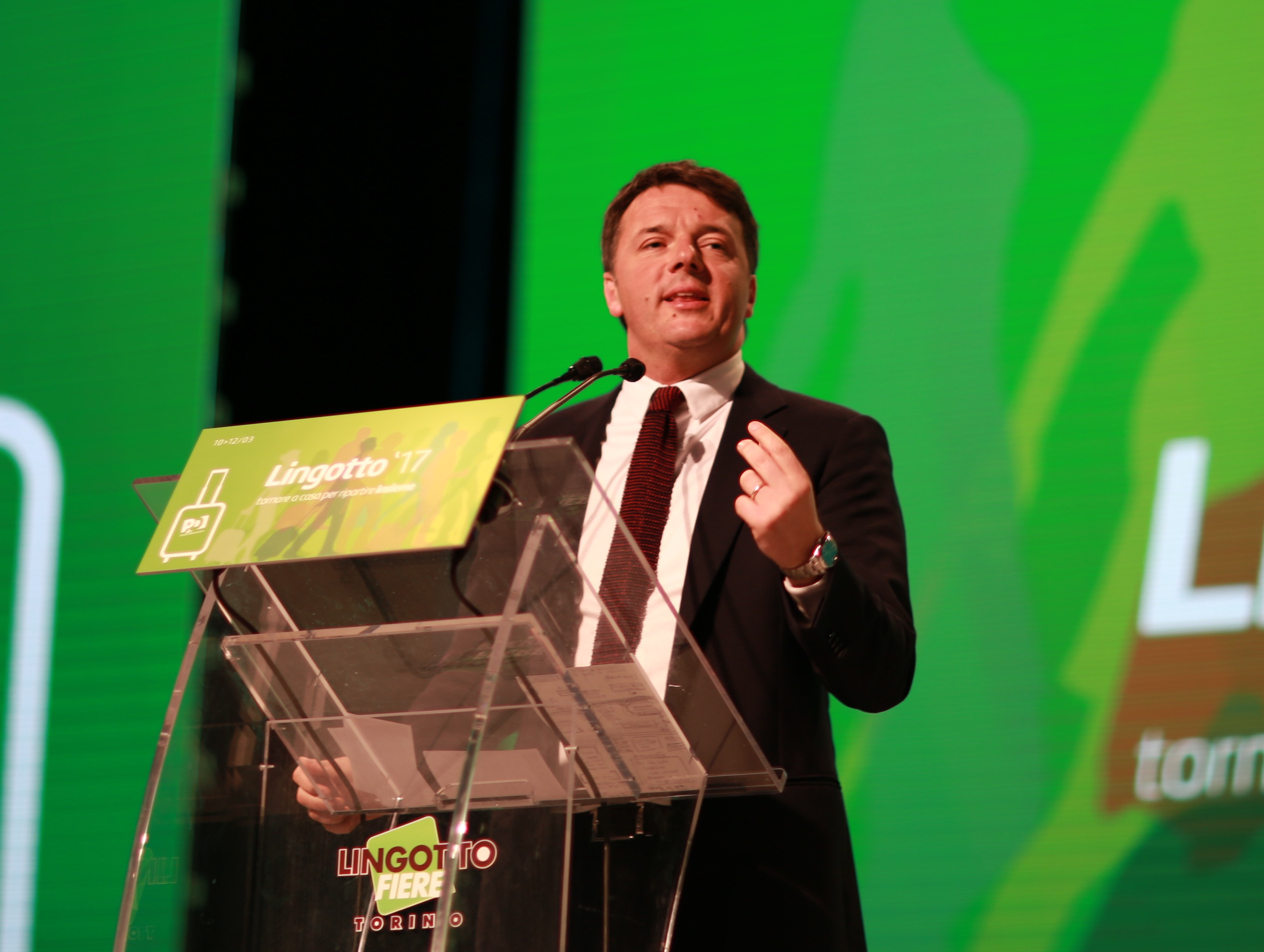
Renzi speaks at Lingotto convention.

In local conventions, Renzi came first (66.7%), Orlando second (25.3%) and Emiliano third (8.0%). In the open primary on 30 April, Renzi won 69.2% of the vote as opposed to Orlando's 20.0% and Emiliano's 10.9%. On 7 May, Renzi was sworn in as secretary again, with Maurizio Martina as deputy and Orfini was confirmed president.

In the 2017 Sicilian regional election, Crocetta did not stand and the PD-led coalition was defeated.

In the run-up of the 2018 general election, the PD tried to form a broad centre-left coalition, but only minor parties showed interest. As a result, the alliance comprised Together (a list notably including the Italian Socialist Party and the Federation of the Greens), the Popular Civic List (notably including Popular Alternative, Italy of Values, the Centrists for Europe and Solidary Democracy) and More Europe (including the Italian Radicals, Forza Europa and the Democratic Centre).

==== 2018 general election ====
In the election, the PD obtained its worst result ever: 18.7% of the vote, well behind the M5S (32.7%) and narrowly ahead of the Lega (17.4%). Following his party's defeat, Renzi resigned from secretary and his deputy Martina started functioning as acting secretary.

After two months of negotiations and the refusal of the PD to join forces with the M5S, the latter and the Lega formed a government under Prime Minister Giuseppe Conte, a M5S-proposed independent. Thus, the party returned to opposition after virtually seven years and experienced some internal turmoil as its internal factions started to re-position themselves in the new context. Both Gentiloni and Franceschini distanced from Renzi while Carlo Calenda, a former minister in Renzi's and Gentiloni's governments who had joined the party soon after the election, proposed to merge the PD into a larger republican front. However, according to several observers Renzi's grip over the party was still strong and he was still the PD's leader behind the scenes.

=== Leadership of Maurizio Martina ===
In July, Maurizio Martina was elected secretary by the party's national assembly and a new leadership election was scheduled for the first semester of 2019. On 17 November 2018, Martina resigned and the national assembly was dissolved, starting the electoral proceedings.

During Martina's tenure, especially after a rally in Rome in September, the party started to prepare for the leadership election.

In January 2019, Calenda launched the "We Are Europeans" manifesto advocating for a pro-Europeanist joint list at the upcoming European Parliament election. Among those who signed there were several Democratic regional presidents and mayors as well as Giuseppe Sala and Giuliano Pisapia, two independents who are the current mayor of Milan and his predecessor, respectively. Calenda aimed at uniting the PD, More Europe and the Greens–Italia in Comune.

=== Leadership of Nicola Zingaretti ===
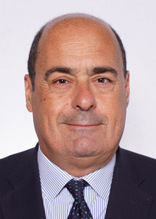
Nicola Zingaretti

Three major candidates, Martina, Nicola Zingaretti and Roberto Giachetti, plus a handful of minor ones, formally filed papers to run for secretary. Prior to that, Marco Minniti, minister of the Interior in the Gentiloni Cabinet, had also launched his bid, before renouncing in December and supporting Zingaretti. Zingaretti won the first round by receiving 47.4% of the vote among party members in local conventions. He, along with Martina and Giachetti, qualified for the primary election, to be held on 3 March. In the event, Zingaretti was elected secretary, exceeding expectations and winning 66.0% of the vote while Martina and Giachetti won 22.0% and 12.0%, respectively.

Zingaretti was officially appointed by the national assembly, on 17 March. On the same day, former Prime Minister Gentiloni was elected as the party's new president. A month later, Zingaretti appointed Andrea Orlando and Paola De Micheli as deputy secretaries.

In the run-up to the 2019 European Parliament election Zingaretti presented a special logo including a large reference to "We Are Europeans" and the symbol of the PES. Additionally, the party forged an alliance with Article One. In the election, the PD garnered 22.7% of the vote, finishing second after the League. Calenda was the most voted candidate of the party.

On 3 July 2019, David Sassoli, a member of the PD, was elected President of the European Parliament.

==== Coalition with the Five Star Movement ====
In August 2019 tensions grew within Conte's government coalition, leading to the issuing of a motion of no-confidence on Prime Minister Conte by the League. After Conte's resignation, the national board of the PD officially opened to the possibility of forming a new cabinet in a coalition with the M5S, based on pro-Europeanism, green economy, sustainable development, fight against economic inequality and a new immigration policy. The party also accepted that Conte may continue at the head of a new government, and on 29 August President Mattarella formally invested Conte to do so. Disappointed by the party's decision to form a government with the M5S, Calenda decided to leave and establish We Are Europeans as an independent party.

The Conte II Cabinet took office on 5 September, with Franceschini as Minister of Culture and head of the PD's delegation. Gentiloni was contextually picked by the government as the Italian member of the von der Leyen Commission and would serve as European Commissioner for the Economy.

On 18 September, Renzi, who had been one of the earliest supporters of a M5S–PD pact in August, left the PD and established a new centrist party named Italia Viva (IV). 24 deputies and 13 senators (including Renzi) left. However, not all supporters of Renzi followed him in the split: while the Always Forward and Back to the Future factions mostly followed him, most members of Reformist Base remained in the party. Other MPs and one MEP joined IV afterwards.

From 15 to 17 November, the party held a three-days convention in Bologna, named Tutta un'altra storia ("A whole different story"), with the aim of presenting party's proposals for the 2020s decade. The convention was characterised by a strong leftward move, stressing a strong distance from liberal and centrist policies promoted under Renzi's leadership. Some newspapers, like La Stampa, compared Zingaretti's new policies to Jeremy Corbyn's. On 17 November the party's national assembly approved the new party's statute, featuring the separation between the roles of party secretary and candidate for prime minister.

Starting from November 2019, the grassroots Sardines movement began in the region of Emilia-Romagna, aimed at contrasting the rise of right-wing populism and the League in the region. The movement endorsed the PD's candidate Stefano Bonaccini in the upcoming Emilia-Romagna regional election. In the next months the movement grew to a national level. On 26 January Bonaccini was re-elected with 51.4% of the vote. On the same day, in the Calabrian regional election, the centre-left candidate supported by the PD lost to the centre-right candidate Jole Santelli, who won with 55.3% of the vote.

In February 2020 the party's national assembly unanimously elected its new president, Valentina Cuppi, mayor of Marzabotto.

In the September 2020 regional elections the party lost Marche to the centre-right, but held Tuscany, Campania and Apulia.

==== Draghi's national unity government ====
On 13 January 2021, Renzi's IV withdrew its support for the second Conte cabinet, triggering the 2021 Italian government crisis. The government won motions of confidence in both chambers of Parliament, but still lacked an overall majority, leading to Conte's resignation. In resulting discussions, Zingaretti and the PD pushed for Conte to be reappointed prime minister. They participated in negotiations with the M5S, IV, and LeU, from 30 January to 2 February, but IV ultimately rejected the option of a renewed coalition. President Mattarella then appointed Mario Draghi to form a cabinet, which won support from the League and Forza Italia (FI) on 10 February. The PD's national board voted unanimously to join the new government on 11 February. Later that day, the M5S also agreed to support the cabinet in an online referendum. The PD had three ministers in the Draghi Cabinet: Lorenzo Guerini, who remained Minister of Defence; Andrea Orlando, the new Minister of Labour and Social Policies; and Dario Franceschini, who retained a modified Minister of Culture portfolio.

=== Leadership of Enrico Letta ===
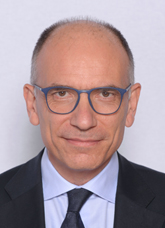
Enrico Letta

In the midst of the formation of Draghi's government, Zingaretti was heavily criticised by the party's minority for his management of the crisis and strenuous support to Conte. On 4 March, after weeks of internal turmoil, Zingaretti announced his resignation as secretary, stating that he was "ashamed of the power struggles" within the party. In the next days, many prominent members of the PD, including Zingaretti himself, but also former Prime Minister Gentiloni, former party secretary Franceschini and President of Emilia-Romagna Bonaccini, publicly asked former Prime Minister Enrico Letta to become the new leader of the party. Following an initial reluctancy, Letta stated that he needed a few days to evaluate the option. On 12 March, he officially accepted his candidacy as new party's leader. On 14 March, the national assembly of the PD elected Letta secretary with 860 votes in favour, 2 against and 4 abstentions.

On 17 March, Letta appointed Irene Tinagli and Peppe Provenzano as his deputy secretaries. On the following day, he appointed the party's new executive, composed of eight men and eight women. Later that month, Letta forced the party's leaders in Parliament, Graziano Delrio and Andrea Marcucci, to resign and proposed the election of two female leaders. Consequently, Simona Malpezzi and Debora Serracchiani were elected to replace them.

In October 2021, Letta won the by-election for the Siena district with 49.9% of votes, returning to the Parliament after six years. In the concurrent local elections, the PD and its allies won municipal elections in Milan, Bologna, Naples, Rome, Turin and many other major cities across the country.

==== 2022 general election ====
In July 2022 the M5S did not participate in a Senate's confidence vote on a government bill. Prime Minister Draghi offered his resignation, which was rejected by President Mattarella. After a few days, Draghi sought a confidence vote again to secure the government majority supporting his cabinet, while rejecting the proposal put forward by Lega and FI of a new government without the M5S. In that occasion, the M5S, Lega, FI and FdI did not participate in the vote. Consequently, Draghi tendered his final resignation to President Mattarella, who dissolved the houses of Parliament, leading to the 2022 general election. The event led the party to terminate the alliance with the M5S.

In the run-up of the election, the PD formed a joint list named Democratic and Progressive Italy (IDP) along with several minor parties, notably including Article One, the Italian Socialist Party and Solidary Democracy. The PD also signed individual alliances with Action–More Europe, the Greens and Left Alliance (AVS) formed by Green Europe and Italian Left, and Luigi Di Maio's and Bruno Tabacci's Civic Commitment. Under each agreement, the PD would give a number of candidates in single-seat constituencies to each coalition partner. A few days before the closing of coalitions and lists, Calenda announced that he was walking away from the pact he has signed with Letta because of the subsequent alliances that the PD had formed, notably including that with the AVS. The IDP list offered a broad range of candidates, including some high-profile independents: left-wingers like Susanna Camusso and Elly Schlein, the liberal economist Carlo Cottarelli, Christian-democrat and long-time MP Pier Ferdinando Casini, scientist Andrea Crisanti, etc.

In the election the PD obtained 19.1% of the vote and the centre-left coalition lost to the centre-right coalition, whose leader Giorgia Meloni went on to form a government. Consequently, Letta announced that he would step down from party secretary and that a leadership election would determine the party's new leader in 2023.

Following the 2022 general election, the PD has consistently declined in opinion polls to a record low of 14.0% in January 2023, according to SWG.

=== Leadership of Elly Schlein ===
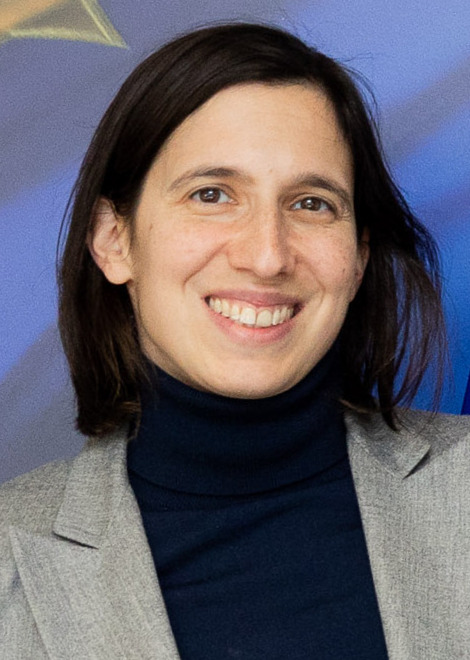
Elly Schlein

The 2023 leadership election scheduled for February 2023 was the final step of a "constituent" process for the PD, as the party amended its statute, updated its internal charters and refreshed its political platform, while welcoming individuals, minor parties and groups. Among minor parties, Article One, Solidary Democracy and the Democratic Centre indicated their intent to merge into the PD. Outgoing secretary Letta and Article One leader Roberto Speranza were chosen to lead the committee overseeing the process. Former minister Paola De Micheli was the first to announce her candidacy in late September, but the two top contenders were Stefano Bonaccini, president of Emilia Romagna, and Elly Schlein, Bonaccini's former vice president. Bonaccini was supported by most regional presidents and big-city mayors, plus the more moderate factions of the party, notably including Reformist Base, while the more radical Schlein counted on the endorsement on most of the party's left and most bigwigs, including former leaders Dario Franceschini (despite most of his faction supporting Bonaccini) and Nicola Zingaretti. A fourth candidate, Gianni Cuperlo, representing the traditional left-wing within the party, announced his bid just before Christmas.

Bonaccini won the first round by receiving 52.9% of the vote among party members in local conventions, while Schlein came second with 34.9% and was the only one to qualify for the primary election, along with Bonaccini. In the event, on 26 February, Schlein was surprisingly elected secretary, by defeating Bonaccini 53.8% to 46.2%. Schlein was officially appointed by the national assembly, on 12 March. On the same day, as proposed by Schlein, Bonaccini was elected as the party's president. In June 2023, during an assembly of delegates held in Naples, Article One was merged into the PD.

In the 2024 European Parliament election Schlein will lead the party in two constituencies, but refrained to add her name to the symbol, after internal opposition. Bonaccini, philanthropist Cecilia Strada and journalist Lucia Annunziata will lead the party in the other three constituencies. Other leading candidates include Giorgio Gori, Matteo Ricci and Antonio Decaro (outgoing mayors of Bergamo, Pesaro and Bari, respectively), as well as former party leader Zingaretti and Marco Tarquinio, a social-conservative and pacifist journalist. The PD's share of the vote was 24.1%, with Decaro and Bonaccini being the most voted candidates and receiving far more preference votes than Schlein in their respective constituencies.

In the 2025 regional elections the centre-left retained the control of the regions that it previously government, including Tuscany with PD's Eugenio Giani, Apulia with PD's Antonio Decaro and Campania with M5S' Roberto Fico. The PD was by far the largest party in all three regions, especially in Apulia where it fielded three lists, which obtained the absolute majority of seats.

== Ideology ==
The PD is a big tent centre-left party, influenced by the ideas of social democracy and the Christian left. The common roots of the founding components of the party reside in the Italian resistance movement, the writing of Italian Constitution and the Historic Compromise, all three events which saw the Italian Communist Party and Christian Democracy (the two major forerunners of the Democrats of the Left and Democracy is Freedom – The Daisy, respectively) cooperate. Modern American liberalism is an important source of inspiration. In a 2008 interview to El País, Veltroni, who can be considered the main founding father of the party, clearly stated that the PD should be considered a reformist party and could not be linked to the traditional values of the political left.

There is also a debate on whether the PD is actually a social democratic party and to what extent. In 2009, Alfred Pfaller observed that the PD "has adopted a pronounced centrist-pragmatic position, trying to appeal to a broad spectrum of middle-class and working-class voters, but shying away from a determined pursuit of redistributive goals". In 2016, Gianfranco Pasquino commented that "for almost all the leaders, militants and members of the PD, social democracy has never been part of their past nor should represent their political goal", adding that "its overall identity and perception are by no means those of a European-style social democratic party". The party's economics policies accepted economic liberal elements under Renzi's leadership, moving towards adopting more explicitly neoliberal and monetarist policies as a result of the Third Way philosophy adopted by European social democratic parties.

The party stresses national and social cohesion, progressivism, a moderate social liberalism, green issues, progressive taxation, and pro-Europeanism. In this respect, the party's precursors strongly supported the need of balancing budgets to comply to Maastricht criteria. Under Veltroni and Renzi, the party took a strong stance in favour of constitutional reform and of a new electoral law on the road toward a two-party system.

While traditionally supporting the social integration of immigrants, the PD has adopted a more critical approach on the issue since 2017. Inspired by Renzi, re-elected secretary in April, and Marco Minniti, interior minister since December 2016, the party promoted stricter policies regarding immigration and public security. These policies resulted in broad criticism from the left-wing Democrats and Progressives (partners in government) as well as left-leaning intellectuals like Roberto Saviano and Gad Lerner. In August, Lerner, who was among the founding members of the PD, left the party altogether due to its new immigration policies.

The party is described as objectively social-liberal by Marxist and socialist soures.

=== Ideological trends ===
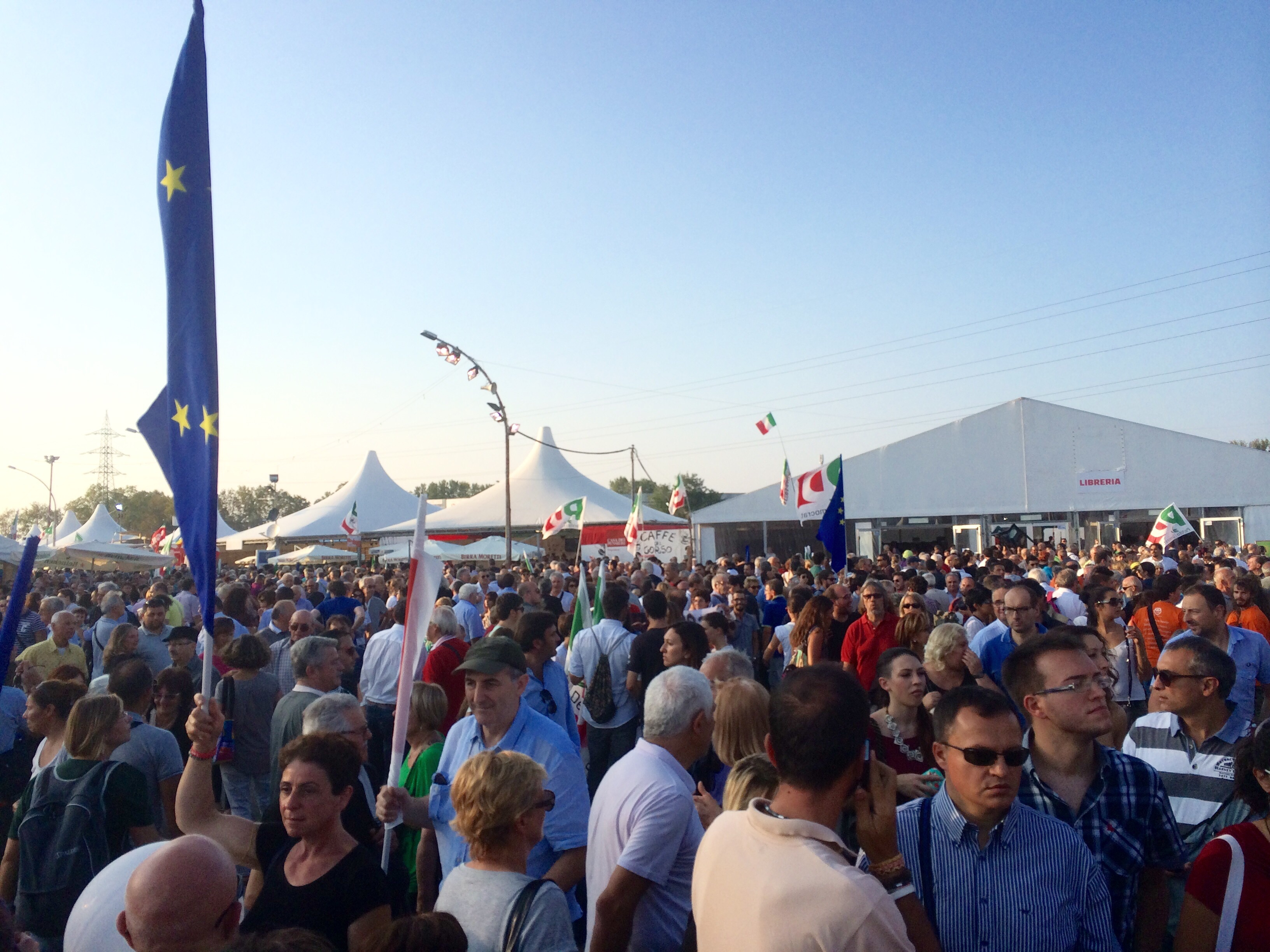
Festa de l'Unità in Bologna, 2014

The PD is a diverse party, including several distinct ideological trends:

- Social democracy – the bulk of the party, including many former Democrats of the Left, is social democratic and emphasises labour and social issues. There are traditional social democrats (Nicola Zingaretti and his Great Square faction, Andrea Orlando and his Democracy Europe Society faction, Maurizio Martina and his Side by Side faction, Gianni Cuperlo and LeftDem, as well as many other people and factions; prior to the February 2017 split, it also included Massimo D'Alema, Pier Luigi Bersani, Enrico Rossi and Roberto Speranza), and Third Way types (Walter Veltroni, Piero Fassino and Debora Serracchiani, among others). While the former are supportive of democratic socialism, the latter are strongly influenced by modern American liberalism and New Labour ideas.
- Christian left – the party includes many Christian-inspired members, most of whom come from the left wing of the late Christian Democracy (having later joined Democracy is Freedom – The Daisy). Democratic Catholics have been affiliated to several factions, including Luca Lotti's Reformist Base, Dario Franceschini's AreaDem (which includes also some leading Third-Way social democrats as the aforementioned Fassino and Serracchiani), Enrico Letta's 360 Association (also Lettiani, mainly Christian democrats and centrists), Giuseppe Fioroni's Populars, Rosy Bindi's Democrats Really and the Social Christians (who adhere to Christian socialism).
- Social liberalism – it is endorsed by former members of the Italian Republican Party, the Italian Liberal Party and the Radical Party, and notably the Liberal PD faction.
- Green politics – it is endorsed mainly by former members of the Federation of the Greens and other greens, who have jointly formed the Democratic Ecologists.

It is not an easy task to include the trend represented by Matteo Renzi, whose supporters have been known as Big Bangers, Now!, or more frequently Renziani, in any of the categories above. The nature of Renzi's progressivism is a matter of debate and has been linked both to liberalism and populism. According to Maria Teresa Meli of Corriere della Sera, Renzi "pursues a precise model, borrowed from the Labour Party and Bill Clinton's Democratic Party", comprising "a strange mix (for Italy) of liberal policies in the economic sphere and populism. This means that, on one side, he will attack the privileges of trade unions, especially of the CGIL, which defends only the already protected, while, on the other, he will sharply attack the vested powers, bankers, Confindustria and a certain type of capitalism ... ". After Renzi led some of his followers out of the party and launched the alternative Italia Viva party, a good chunk of Renziani (especially those affiliated to Reformist Base and Liberal PD) remained in the PD. Other leading former Renziani notably include Lorenzo Guerini, Graziano Delrio (party leader in the Chamber) and Andrea Marcucci (party leader in the Senate).

=== International affiliation ===
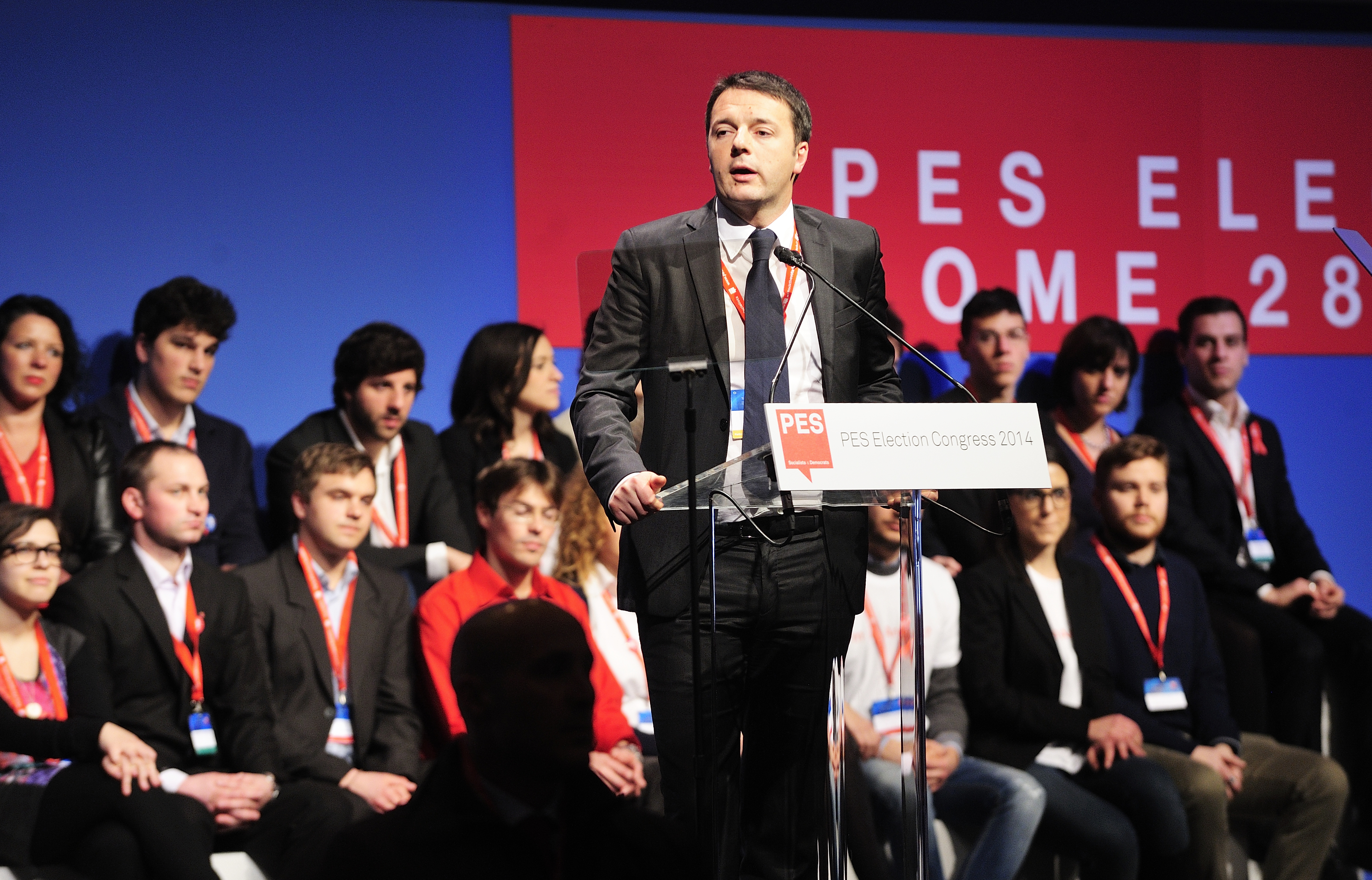
Renzi speaks at the 2014 congress of the Party of European Socialists in Rome.

International affiliation was quite a controversial issue for the PD in its early days and it was settled only in 2014. The debate on which European political party to join saw the former Democrats of the Left generally in favour of the Party of European Socialists (PES) and most former members of Democracy is Freedom – The Daisy in favour of the European Democratic Party (EDP), a component of the Alliance of Liberals and Democrats for Europe (ALDE) Group. After the party's formation in 2007, the new party's MEPs continued to sit with the PES and ALDE groups to which their former parties had been elected during the 2004 European Parliament election. Following the 2009 European Parliament election, the party's 21 MEPs chose to unite for the new term within the European parliamentary group of the PES, which was renamed the Progressive Alliance of Socialists and Democrats (S&D).

On 15 December 2012, PD leader Pier Luigi Bersani attended in Rome the founding convention of the Progressive Alliance (PA), a nascent political international for parties dissatisfied with the continued admittance and inclusion of authoritarian movements into the Socialist International (SI). On 22 May 2013, the PD was a founding member of the PA at the international's official inauguration in Leipzig, Germany on the eve of the 150th anniversary of the formation of the General German Workers' Association, the oldest of the two parties which merged in 1875 to form the Social Democratic Party of Germany.

Matteo Renzi, a centrist who led the party in 2013–2018, wanted the party to join both the SI and the PES. On 20 February 2014, the PD leadership applied for full membership of the PES. In Renzi's view, the party would count more as a member of a major European party and within the PES it would join forces with alike parties such as the British Labour Party. On 28 February, the PD was welcomed as a full member into the PES.

== Factions ==
The PD includes several internal factions, most of which trace the previous allegiances of party members. Factions form different alliances depending on the issues and some party members have multiple factional allegiances.

=== 2007 leadership election ===
After the election, which saw the victory of Walter Veltroni, the party's internal composition was as follows:

- Majority led by Walter Veltroni (75.8%)
  - Three national lists supported the candidacy of Veltroni. The bulk of the former Democrats of the Left (Veltroniani, Dalemiani, Fassiniani), the Rutelliani of Francesco Rutelli (including the Teodems), The Populars of Franco Marini, Liberal PD, the Social Christians and smaller groups (Middle Italy, European Republicans Movement, Reformist Alliance and the Reformists for Europe) formed a joint-list named Democrats with Veltroni (43.7%). The Democratic Ecologists of Ermete Realacci, together with Giovanna Melandri and Cesare Damiano, formed Environment, Innovation and Labour (8.1%). The Democrats, Laicists, Socialists, Say Left and the Labourites – Liberal Socialists presented a list named To the Left (7.7%). Local lists in support of Veltroni got 16.4%.
- Minorities led by Rosy Bindi (12.9%) and Enrico Letta (11.0%)
  - The Olivists, whose members were staunch supporters of Romano Prodi, divided in two camps. The largest one, including Arturo Parisi, endorsed Rosy Bindi while a smaller one, including Paolo De Castro, endorsed Enrico Letta. Bindi benefited also from the support of Agazio Loiero's Southern Democratic Party while Letta was endorsed by Lorenzo Dellai's Daisy Civic List, Renato Soru's Sardinia Project and Gianni Pittella's group of social democrats.

=== 2009 leadership election ===
After the election, which saw the victory of Pier Luigi Bersani, the party's internal composition was as follows:

- Majority led by Pier Luigi Bersani (53.2%)
  - Bersaniani and Dalemiani: the social democratic groups around Bersani and Massimo D'Alema (who wants the PD to be a traditional centre-left party in the European social democratic tradition). D'Alema organised his faction as Reformists and Democrats, welcoming also some Lettiani and some Populars.
  - Lettiani: the centrist group around Enrico Letta, known also as 360 Association. Its members were keen supporters of an alliance with the Union of the Centre.
  - To the Left: the social democratic and democratic-socialist internal left led by Livia Turco.
  - Democrats Really: the group around Rosy Bindi and composed mainly of the left-wing members of the late Italian People's Party.
  - Social Christians: a Christian social democratic group that was a founding component of the Democrats of the Left.
  - Democracy and Socialism: a social democratic group of splinters from the Socialist Party led by Gavino Angius.
- AreaDem, minority led by Dario Franceschini (34.3%).
  - Veltroniani: followers of Walter Veltroni and social democrats coming from the Democrats of the Left who support the so-called "majoritarian vocation" of the party, the selection of party candidates and leaders through primaries and a two-party system.
  - Populars/Fourth Phase: heirs of the Christian left tradition of the Italian People's Party and of the left wing of the late Christian Democracy.
  - Rutelliani: centrists and liberals gathered around Francesco Rutelli, known also as Free Democrats; most of them left after Bersani's victory to form the Alliance for Italy while a minority (Paolo Gentiloni and Ermete Realacci, among others) chose to stay.
  - Simply Democrats: a list promoted by a diverse group of leading Democrats (Debora Serracchiani, Rita Borsellino, Sergio Cofferati, and Francesca Barracciu) who were committed to renewal in party leadership and cleanliness of party elects.
  - Liberal PD: the liberal (mostly social-liberal) faction of the PD led by Valerio Zanone. Its members have been close to Veltroni and Rutelli.
  - Democratic Ecologists: the green faction of the PD led by Ermete Realacci. Its members have been close to Veltroni and Rutelli.
  - Teodem: a tiny Christian-democratic group representing the right wing of the party on social issues, albeit being progressive on economic ones. Most Teodems, including their leader Paola Binetti, left the PD in 2009–2010 to join the UdC or the ApI while others, led by Luigi Bobba, chose to stay.
- Minority led by Ignazio Marino (12.5%)
  - Un-affiliated social liberals, social democrats and supporters of a broad alliance including Italy of Values, the Radicals and the parties to the left of the PD. After the election, most of them joined Marino in an association named Change Italy.
  - Democrats in Network: a social democratic faction of former Veltroniani led by Goffredo Bettini.
- Non-aligned factions
  - Olivists: followers of Romano Prodi who want the party to be stuck in the tradition of The Olive Tree. The group was led by Arturo Parisi and includes both Christian left exponents and social democrats. Most Olivists supported Bersani while Parisi endorsed Franceschini.

=== 2010–2013 developments ===
In the summer of 2010, Dario Franceschini, leader of AreaDem (the largest minority faction) and Piero Fassino re-approached with Pier Luigi Bersani and joined the party majority. As a response, Walter Veltroni formed Democratic Movement to defend the "original spirit" of the PD. In doing this he was supported by 75 deputies: 33 Veltroniani, 35 Populars close to Giuseppe Fioroni and 7 former Rutelliani led by Paolo Gentiloni. Some pundits hinted that the Bersani-Franceschini pact was envisioned in order both to marginalise Veltroni and to reduce the influence of Massimo D'Alema, the party bigwig behind Bersani, whose 2009 bid was supported primarily by Dalemiani. Veltroni and D'Alema had been long-time rivals within the centre-left.

As of September the party's majority was composed of those who supported Bersani since the beginning (divided in five main factions: Bersaniani, Dalemiani, Lettiani, Bindiani and the party's left-wing) and AreaDem of Franceschini and Fassino. There were also two minority coalitions, namely Veltroni's Democratic Movement (Veltroniani, Fioroni's Populars, ex-Rutelliani, Democratic Ecologists and a majority of Liberal PD members) and Change Italy of Ignazio Marino.

According to Corriere della Sera in November 2011, the party was divided mainly in three ideological camps battling for its soul:

- a socialist left: the Young Turks (mostly supporters of Bersani such as Stefano Fassina and Matteo Orfini);
- a social democratic centre: it includes Bersani's core supporters (Bersaniani, Dalemiani and Bindiani); and
- a "new right": Matteo Renzi's faction, proposing an overtly liberal political line.

Since November 2011, similar differences surfaced in the party over Monti Cabinet. While the party's right wing, especially Liberal PD, was enthusiastic in its support, Fassina and other leftists, especially those linked to trade unions, were critical. In February 2012, Fassina published a book in which he described his view as "neo-labourite humanism" and explained it in connection with Catholic social teaching, saying that his "neo-labourism" was designed to attract Catholic voters. Once again, his opposition to economic liberalism was strongly criticised by the party's right-wing as well as by Stefano Ceccanti, a leading Catholic in the party and supporter of Tony Blair's New Labour, who said that a leftist platform à la Fassina would never win back the Catholic vote in places like Veneto.

According to YouTrend, a website, 35% of the Democratic deputies and senators elected in the 2013 general election were Bersaniani, 23% members of AreaDem (or Democratic Movement), 13% Renziani, 6% Lettiani, 4.5% Dalemiani, 4.5% Young Turks/Remake Italy, 2% Bindiani and 1.5% Civatiani.

As the party performed below expectations, more Democrats started to look at Renzi, who had been defeated by Bersani in the 2012 primary election to select the centre-left's candidate for prime minister. In early September, two leading centrists, namely Franceschini and Fioroni (leaders of Democratic Area and The Populars), endorsed Renzi. Two former leaders of the Democrats of the Left, Veltroni and Fassino, also decided to support Renzi while a third, D'Alema, endorsed Gianni Cuperlo.

In October, four candidates filed their bid to become secretary, namely Renzi, Cuperlo, Pippo Civati and Gianni Pittella.

=== 2013 leadership election ===
After the election, which saw the victory of Matteo Renzi, the party's internal composition was as follows:

- Majority led by Matteo Renzi (67.6%)
  - Renziani, AreaDem, Veltroniani, The Populars, Liberal PD, most Lettiani, most Olivists and Democratic Ecologists
- Minority led by Gianni Cuperlo (18.2%):
  - Bersaniani, Dalemiani, Young Turks/Remake Italy and most Democrats Really
- Minority led by Pippo Civati (14.2%):
  - Civatiani, Laura Puppato and Felice Casson

=== 2014–2016 alignments ===
After 2013 leadership election, the party's main factions were the following:

- Renziani: the group around Matteo Renzi, PD leader and prime minister as well as a liberal, Third Way-oriented and modernising faction. Renziani supported a two-party system and the so-called "majoritarian vocation" of the PD through the formation of a "party of the nation". Prominent members of the faction were Luca Lotti, Maria Elena Boschi, Graziano Delrio, Lorenzo Guerini, Paolo Gentiloni and Stefano Bonaccini. The faction had a Christian-democratic section called Democratic Space which was led by Delrio and Guerini. Another group of Christian democrats, namely The Populars of Giuseppe Fioroni, were also affiliated. According to news sources as of December 2016, full-fledged Renziani counted 50 MPs, The Populars 30 and other Renziani 25, for a total of 105.
- AreaDem: a mainly Christian leftist faction, with roots in Christian Democracy's left-wing and the Italian People's Party. Led by Dario Franceschini, it notably included Luigi Zanda and Ettore Rosato as well as prominent social democrats like Piero Fassino and Debora Serracchiani, for a total of 90 MPs.
- Left is Change: social democratic faction led by Maurizio Martina. Most of its members were affiliated with Reformist Area (see below), but splintered to support Renzi. The faction which included Cesare Damiano, Vannino Chiti and Anna Finocchiaro, among others, counted 70 MPs.
- Remake Italy: a social democratic faction loyal to Renzi. Led by Matteo Orfini (the party's president) and Andrea Orlando, it counted 60 MPs.
- Reformist Area/Left: inspired by traditional social democracy and democratic socialism, it was the main left wing of the party. It was formed by the majority of Bersaniani, loyalists of former secretary Pier Luigi Bersani. The faction's leader was Roberto Speranza. The Reformists often opposed Renzi's policies. Other than Speranza and Bersani, the faction notably included Guglielmo Epifani and Rosy Bindi (whose sub-faction was named Democrats Really) and counted 60 MPs.
- LeftDem: led by Gianni Cuperlo, it was another minority social democratic faction, including 15 MPs.

=== 2017 leadership election ===
After the election which saw the victory of Matteo Renzi, the party's internal composition was as follows:

- Majority led by Matteo Renzi (69.2%)
  - Renziani; AreaDem; The Populars; a majority of Left is Change (e.g. leader Maurizio Martina, who would serve as deputy secretary if Renzi were to win); a minority of Remake Italy (e.g. Matteo Orfini); Liberal PD; and several former Lettiani (e.g. Paola De Micheli)
- Minority led by Andrea Orlando (20.0%)
  - A majority of Remake Italy (e.g. Roberto Gualtieri); a minority of Left is Change (e.g. Cesare Damiano and Anna Finocchiaro); LeftDem; NetworkDem; several former leading Veltroniani (e.g. Nicola Zingaretti), Lettiani (e.g. Alessia Mosca), Bindiani (e.g. Margherita Miotto) and Olivists (e.g. Sandra Zampa)
- Minority led by Michele Emiliano (10.9%)
  - Democratic Front, formed by several PD members in the South, especially Apulia (of which Emiliano is President); some former Lettiani (e.g. Francesco Boccia)

=== 2019 leadership election ===
After the election which saw the victory of Nicola Zingaretti, the party's internal composition was as follows:

- Majority led by Nicola Zingaretti (66.0%)
  - Great Square, Paolo Gentiloni, AreaDem (Dario Franceschini's Franceschiniani and Piero Fassino, among others), Democracy Europe Society, Dem Labourites (Damiano's faction), Socialists and Democrats, LeftDem and NetworkDem
- Minority led by Maurizio Martina (22.0%)
  - Future! European Democrats (Martina's faction), Harambee (Matteo Richetti), Left Wing (Matteo Orfini) and some Renziani (e.g. Graziano Delrio)
- Minority led by Roberto Giachetti (12.0%)
  - Some Renziani (e.g. Maria Elena Boschi), The Populars (Giuseppe Fioroni), Liberal PD, Social Christians and Democratic Ecologists

After the leadership election, supporters of Martina divided in two camps: the liberal and centrist wing close to Renzi (including Lorenzo Guerini and Luca Lotti) formed Reformist Base, while social-democrats (including Martina, Tommaso Nannicini and Debora Serracchiani), as well as some leading centrists (Delrio and Richetti) formed Side by Side. Additionally, hard-core Renziani, led by Giachetti, formed Always Forward. Others, led by Ettore Rosato, formed Back to the Future.

=== 2023 leadership election ===
After the election which saw the victory of Elly Schlein, the party's internal composition was as follows:

- Majority led by Elly Schlein
  - Great Square, AreaDem, Democracy Europe Society, Left Wing (Chiara Gribaudo), Next (Marco Furfaro), and Dem Labourites
- Minority led by Stefano Bonaccini
  - People's Energy, Reformist Base, Side by Side, RiforDem (Paolo Gentiloni), Ulivisti 4.0 (some former Lettiani: Mauro Berruto, Marco Meloni and Anna Ascani), Left Wing (Matteo Orfini) and Democratic Initiative (Piero Fassino)
- Minority led by Gianni Cuperlo
  - Democratic Promise

== Popular support ==
As previously the Italian Communist Party, the Democratic Party of the Left, the Democrats of the Left and The Olive Tree, the PD has its strongholds in Central Italy and big cities. The party governs six regions out of twenty and the cities of Rome, Milan, Naples, Turin, Bologna, Florence and Bari. It also takes part to the government of several other cities, including Padua, Bergamo, Brescia and Verona.

In the 2008 and 2013 general elections, the PD obtained its best results in Tuscany (46.8% and 37.5%), Emilia-Romagna (45.7% and 37.0%), Umbria (44.4% and 32.1%), Marche (41.4% and 27.7%), Liguria (37.6% and 27.7%) and Lazio (36.8% and 25.7%). Democrats are generally stronger in the North than the South, with the sole exception of Basilicata (38.6% in 2008 and 25.7% in 2013), where the party has drawn most of its personnel from Christian Democracy (DC).

The 2014 European Parliament election gave a thumping 40.8% of the vote to the party which was the first Italian party to get more than 40% of the vote in a nationwide election since DC won 42.4% of the vote in the 1958 general election. In 2014, the PD did better in Tuscany (56.6%), Emilia-Romagna (52.5%) and Umbria (49.2%), but made significant gains in Lombardy (40.3%, +19.0% from 2009), Veneto (37.5%, +17.2%) and the South. The 2018 general election was a major defeat for the party as it was reduced to 18.7% (Tuscany 29.6%).

The electoral results of the PD in general (Chamber of Deputies) and European Parliament elections since 2008 are shown in the chart below.

View source data.

The electoral results of the PD in the 10 most populated regions of Italy are shown in the table below and in the chart electoral results in Italy are shown.

	2008 general	2009 European	2010 regional	2013 general	2014 European	2015 regional	2018 general	2019 European	2020 regional
Piedmont	32.4	24.7	23.2	25.1	40.8	41.0 (Note: Combined result of the PD (36.2%) and Sergio Chiamparino's personal list (4.8%).) (2014)	20.5	23.9	-
Lombardy	28.1	21.3	22.9	25.6	40.3	32.4 (Note: Combined result of the PD (25.3%) and Umberto Ambrosoli's personal list (7.0%).) (2013)	21.1	23.1	22.3 (Note: Combined result of the PD (19.2%) and Giorgio Gori's personal list (3.0%).) (2018)
Veneto	26.5	20.3	20.3	21.3	37.5	20.5 (Note: Combined result of the PD (16.7%) and Alessandra Moretti's personal list (3.8%).)	16.7	18.9	-
Emilia-Romagna	45.7	38.6	40.6	37.0	52.5	44.5 (2014)	26.4	31.2	34.7
Tuscany	46.8	38.7	42.2	37.5	56.6	46.3	29.6	33.3	-
Lazio	36.8	28.1	26.3	25.7	39.2	34.2 (Note: Combined result of the PD (29.7%) and Nicola Zingaretti's personal list (4.5%).) (2013)	18.7	23.8	25.5 (Note: Combined result of the PD (21.2%) and Nicola Zingaretti's personal list (4.3%).) (2018)
Campania	29.2	23.4	21.4	21.9	36.1	29.2 (Note: Combined result of the PD (19.5%), Vincenzo De Luca's personal list (4.9%) and Free Campania (4.8%).)	13.2	19.1	-
Apulia	30.1	21.7	20.8	18.5	33.6	32.1 (Note: Combined result of the PD (18.8%) and Michele Emiliano's personal lists (9.2%+4.1%).)	13.7	16.6	-
Calabria	32.6	25.4	22.8 (Note: Combined result of the PD (15.8%) and Agazio Loiero's personal list (7.0%).)	22.4	35.8	36.2 (Note: Combined result of the PD (23.7%) and Mario Oliverio's personal list (12.5%).) (2014)	14.3	18.3	-
Sicily	25.4	21.9	18.8 (2008)	18.6	34.9	21.2 (Note: Combined result of the PD (13.0%), the PD-sponsored Pact of Democrats for Reforms and Fabrizio Micari's personal list (2.2%).) (2017)	11.5	16.6	-

== Election results ==
=== Italian Parliament ===
Election	Leader	Chamber of Deputies					Senate of the Republic				
Election	Leader	Votes	%	Seats	+/–	Position	Votes	%	Seats	+/–	Position
2008	Walter Veltroni	12,434,260	33.2	217 / 630	–	2nd	11,052,577	33.7	118 / 315	–	2nd
2013	Pier Luigi Bersani	8,934,009	25.4	297 / 630	▲80	▲1st	8,400,255	27.4	112 / 315	▼6	▲1st
2018	Matteo Renzi	6,161,896	18.8	112 / 630	▼185	▼2nd	5,783,360	19.1	54 / 315	▼58	▼2nd
2022	Enrico Letta	5,356,180	19.1	69 / 400	▼43	2nd	5,226,732	19.0	40 / 200	▼13	2nd

=== European Parliament ===
Election	Leader	Votes	%	Seats	+/–	Position	EP Group
2009	Dario Franceschini	8,008,203	26.1	21 / 72	New	2nd	S&D
2014	Matteo Renzi	11,203,231	40.8	31 / 73	▲10	▲1st	S&D
2019	Nicola Zingaretti	6,089,853	22.7	19 / 76	▼12	▼2nd	S&D
2024	Elly Schlein	5,646,296	24.1	21 / 76	▲2	2nd	S&D

=== Regional Councils ===
Region	Election year	Votes	%	Seats	+/−	Status in legislature
Aosta Valley	2025	4,854 (5th)	8.04	3 / 35	▼4	Majority
Piedmont	2024	395,710 (2nd)	23.93	13 / 51	▲3	Opposition
Lombardy	2023	628,774 (2nd)	21.82	18 / 80	▲2	Opposition
South Tyrol	2023	9,707 (8th)	3.45	1 / 35	▼1	Opposition
Trentino	2023	38,689 (1st)	16.64	7 / 32	▲3	Opposition
Veneto	2025	277,945 (3rd)	16.60	9 / 51	▲2	Opposition
Friuli-Venezia Giulia	2023	65,143 (4th)	16.49	10 / 49	Steady	Opposition
Emilia-Romagna	2024	641,704 (1st)	42.94	28 / 50	▲5	Majority
Liguria	2024	160,063 (1st)	28.47	9 / 31	▲2	Opposition
Tuscany	2025	437,313 (1st)	34.43	16 / 41	▼7	Majority
Marche	2025	127,638 (2nd)	22.50	7 / 31	▼1	Opposition
Umbria	2024	97,089 (1st)	30.23	9 / 21	▲3	Majority
Lazio	2023	313,023 (2nd)	20.25	11 / 51	▼7	Opposition
Abruzzo	2024	117,497 (2nd)	20.29	6 / 31	▲2	Opposition
Molise	2023	17,031 (2nd)	12.04	3 / 20	▲1	Opposition
Campania	2025	370,016 (1st)	18.41	10 / 51	▲1	Majority
Apulia	2025	344,228 (1st)	25.94	15 / 51	▼2	Majority
Basilicata	2024	22,423 (2nd)	13.87	3 / 21	Steady	Opposition
Calabria	2025	103,119 (2nd)	13.59	5 / 31	Steady	Opposition
Sicily	2022	238,761 (4th)	12.77	11 / 70	Steady	Opposition
Sardinia	2024	94,411 (1st)	13.80	11 / 60	▲3	Majority

== Leadership ==
- Secretary: Walter Veltroni (2007–2009), Dario Franceschini (2009), Pier Luigi Bersani (2009–2013), Guglielmo Epifani (2013), Matteo Renzi (2013–2018), Maurizio Martina (2018), Nicola Zingaretti (2019–2021), Enrico Letta (2021–2023), Elly Schlein (2023–present)
  - Deputy Secretary: Dario Franceschini (2007–2009), Enrico Letta (2009–2013), Lorenzo Guerini (2014–2017), Debora Serracchiani (2014–2017), Maurizio Martina (2017–2018), Andrea Orlando (2019–2021), Paola De Micheli (2019), Irene Tinagli (2021–2023), Peppe Provenzano (2021–2023)
  - Coordinator of the Secretariat: Goffredo Bettini (2007–2009), Maurizio Migliavacca (2009–2013), Luca Lotti (2013–2014), Lorenzo Guerini (2014–2018), Matteo Mauri (2018), Andrea Martella (2019–2021), Marco Meloni (2021–2023), Marta Bonafoni (2023–present)
  - Organizational Secretary: Giuseppe Fioroni (2007–2009), Maurizio Migliavacca (2009), Nico Stumpo (2009–2013), Davide Zoggia (2013–2013), Luca Lotti (2013–2014), Lorenzo Guerini (2014–2017), Andrea Rossi (2017–2018), Gianni Dal Moro (2018–2019), Stefano Vaccari (2019–2023), Igor Taruffi (2023–present)
  - Spokesperson: Andrea Orlando (2008–2013), Lorenzo Guerini (2013–2014), Alessia Rotta (2014–2017), Matteo Richetti (2017–2018), Marianna Madia (2018)
  - Treasurer: Mauro Agostini (2007–2009), Antonio Misiani (2009–2013), Francesco Bonifazi (2013–2019), Luigi Zanda (2019–2020), Walter Verini (2020–2023), Michele Fina (2023–present)
- President: Romano Prodi (2007–2008), Anna Finocchiaro (acting; she was never elected party president but presided over meetings after Prodi's resignation 2008–2009), Rosy Bindi (2009–2013), Gianni Cuperlo (2013–2014), Matteo Orfini (2014–2019), Paolo Gentiloni (2019), Valentina Cuppi (2020–2023), Stefano Bonaccini (2023–present)
  - Vice President: Marina Sereni (2009–2013), Ivan Scalfarotto (2009–2013), Matteo Ricci (2013–2017), Sandra Zampa (2013–2017), Domenico De Santis (2017–2019), Barbara Pollastrini (2017–2019), Anna Ascani (2019–2023), Debora Serracchiani (2019–2023), Loredana Capone (2023–present), Chiara Gribaudo (2023–present)
- Party Leader in the Chamber of Deputies: Antonello Soro (2007–2009), Dario Franceschini (2009–2013), Roberto Speranza (2013–2015), Ettore Rosato (2015–2018), Graziano Delrio (2018–2021), Debora Serracchiani (2021–2023), Chiara Braga (2023–present)
- Party Leader in the Senate: Anna Finocchiaro (2007–2013), Luigi Zanda (2013–2018), Andrea Marcucci (2018–2021), Simona Malpezzi (2021–2023), Francesco Boccia (2023–present)
- Party Leader in the European Parliament: David Sassoli (2009–2014), Patrizia Toia (2014–2019), Roberto Gualtieri (2019), Brando Benifei (2019–2024), Nicola Zingaretti (2024–present)

== See also ==
- List of presidents of the Democratic Party (Italy)
- List of secretaries of the Democratic Party (Italy)
- List of political parties in Italy
