= Side by Side (Italy) =

Side by Side Fianco a Fianco
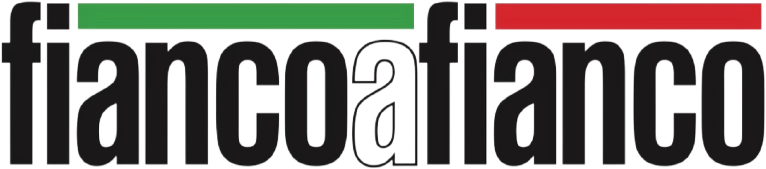
- Leader: Maurizio Martina
- Founded: 2019
- Ideology: Social democracy
- Political position: Centre-left

Website
- www.fianco-a-fianco.it

Side by Side (Italian: Fianco a Fianco) is a social democratic faction within the Democratic Party (PD), a political party in Italy.

The faction was formed in 2019 by Maurizio Martina, after his unsuccessful bid to become party's national secretary in the 2019 leadership election. In the event, Martina obtained 22.0% of the vote in the "primary" election and was defeated by Nicola Zingaretti, who got 66.0%.
