= Luigi Zanda =

Italian politician (born 1942)

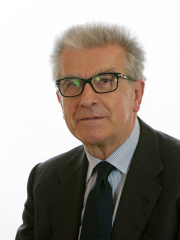

Member of the Senate
- In office 23 May 2003 – 13 October 2022
- Constituency: Lazio

Personal details
- Born: 28 November 1942 (age 83) Cagliari, Italy
- Party: PD (since 2007); DC (1970s–1994); PPI (1994–2002); DL (2002–2007)

Luigi Zanda (born 28 November 1942) is an Italian politician, member of the Senate of the Republic and leader of the Democratic Party in the Senate.

== Political career ==
Zanda was born in Cagliari in 1942. After becoming a lawyer he started working for the Institute for Industrial Reconstruction (IRI). During 1970s Zanda joined the Christian Democracy (DC) and cooperated with the Ministry of Public Administration. Then he became the spokesperson of the Christian democratic leader Francesco Cossiga.

In 2003 Zanda was elected at the Italian Senate for The Daisy, a centrist party, heir of the DC left-wing. In 2007 he was among the founding fathers of the centre-left Democratic Party. On 19 March 2013, after the February's general election, he was elected by acclamation PD leader in the Senate.
