= Piazza Grande (faction) =

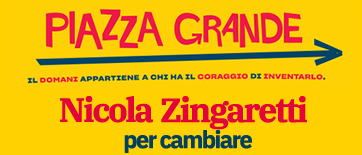
- Leader: Nicola Zingaretti
- Coordinator: Massimiliano Smeriglio
- Founded: October 2018
- Ideology: Social democracy Democratic socialism
- Political position: Centre-left to left-wing

Website
- Official website

Piazza Grande is a social democratic and democratic socialist faction within the Democratic Party (PD), a political party in Italy. Its leader is Nicola Zingaretti, President of Lazio region from 2013 to 2022 and former leader of the PD. He is considered a social democrat and one of the most prominent members of the party's left-wing. Piazza Grande's members are also known as Zingarettiani from the name of their leader.

== History ==
The faction, which has never been organised as a formal faction, grew around Nicola Zingaretti, in late 2018. Born in 1965, Zingaretti became, during the 1990s, a prominent European youth leader, serving as National Secretary of the Left Youth, the youth-wing of the Democratic Party of the Left and as President of International Union of Socialist Youth. In 2004, he was elected Member of the European Parliament for the centre-left coalition The Olive Tree. Then, from 2008 he served as President of the Province of Rome, until 2013, when he was elected President of Lazio.

On 4 March 2018, Zingaretti was narrowly re-elected president with 1,018,736 votes (32.9%), defeating the centre-right candidate Stefano Parisi (31.2%) and the Five Star's Roberta Lombardi (27%). Despite the small margin of victory, Zingaretti's win was seen as a strong showing due to the poor electoral result of the centre-left coalition in the general election which was held in the same day. After the election defeat, the Democratic leader, Matteo Renzi, resigned from secretary, his deputy Maurizio Martina started functioning as acting secretary and a new leadership election was called for early 2019. On 7 July 2018, Nicola Zingaretti announced his intention to run as new party's leader.

In August 2018, Zingaretti launched the political convention in support of his candidacy, named Piazza Grande, which was held in Rome in October. Zingaretti's campaign was based on a social democratic platform, whose aim was to abandon the social liberal and centrist policies promoted by Matteo Renzi and to move the Democratic Party more on the left. The campaign's main themes were social justice and fight to economic inequality.

== Symbols ==
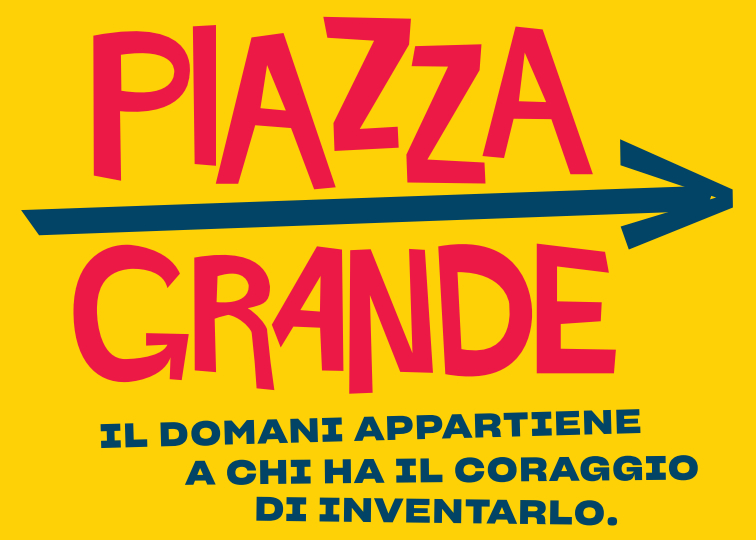
Piazza Grande logo

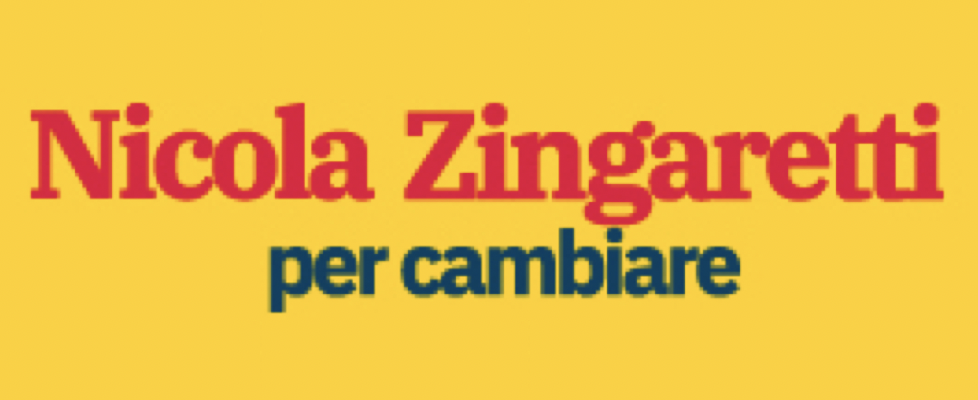
Zingaretti's campaign logo
