= Lettiani =

Followers of Enrico Letta

Lettiani referred to the followers of Enrico Letta, former Prime Minister of Italy and a leading member of the Democratic Party, a political party in Italy.

The followers of Letta are generally centrists proposing an alliance with the Union of Christian and Centre Democrats and a liberal approach to the economy. Thanks to the central position of Letta in the party, the group maintains good relations with all the other big factions of the party: Populars, Olivists, Dalemiani and Veltroniani. In the 2009 Democratic Party leadership election the group supported Pier Luigi Bersani.

Lettiani are rallied in the 360 Association.
