= Democracy Europe Society =

Democracy Europe Society Democrazia Europa Società
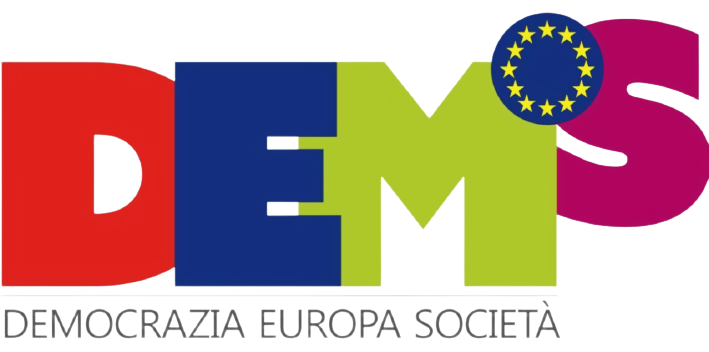
- Leader: Andrea Orlando
- Ideology: Social democracy Democratic socialism
- Political position: Left-wing

Democracy Europe Society (Italian: Democrazia Europa Società, DEMS) is a social-democratic faction within the Democratic Party (PD), a political party in Italy. Most of its members hail from the Democrats of the Left (DS), a social-democratic party with roots in the Italian Communist Party (PCI).

The faction was formed in August 2017 by Andrea Orlando, then Minister of Justice, after his unsuccessful bid to become party's national secretary in the 2017 leadership election. In the event, Orlando obtained 20.0% of the vote in the "primary" election and was defeated by Matteo Renzi, who got 69.2%.
