= Matteo Orfini =

Italian politician (born 1974)

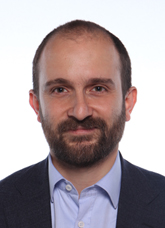
- Matteo Orfini in 2013

President of the Democratic Party
- In office 14 June 2014 – 17 March 2019
- Preceded by: Gianni Cuperlo
- Succeeded by: Paolo Gentiloni

Member of the Chamber of Deputies
- Incumbent
- Assumed office 15 March 2013
- Constituency: Lazio 1

Personal details
- Born: 30 August 1974 (age 51) Rome, Italy
- Party: Democratic Party

Matteo Orfini (born August 30, 1974 in Rome, Italy) is an Italian politician. He is a member of Italy's Chamber of Deputies and president of the Democratic Party.

== Biography ==
Matteo Orfini was born in Rome in 1974. He started his interest in politics when he attended the lyceum.

In 2004, he became a collaborator of the left-wing leader, Massimo D'Alema, after his election in the European Parliament.

In 2007, Orfini joined the Democratic Party, becoming the leader of the party's internal left-wing faction Remake Italy.

On 14 June 2014, he replaced Gianni Cuperlo as president of the Democratic Party.
