= Goffredo Bettini =

Italian politician (born 1952)

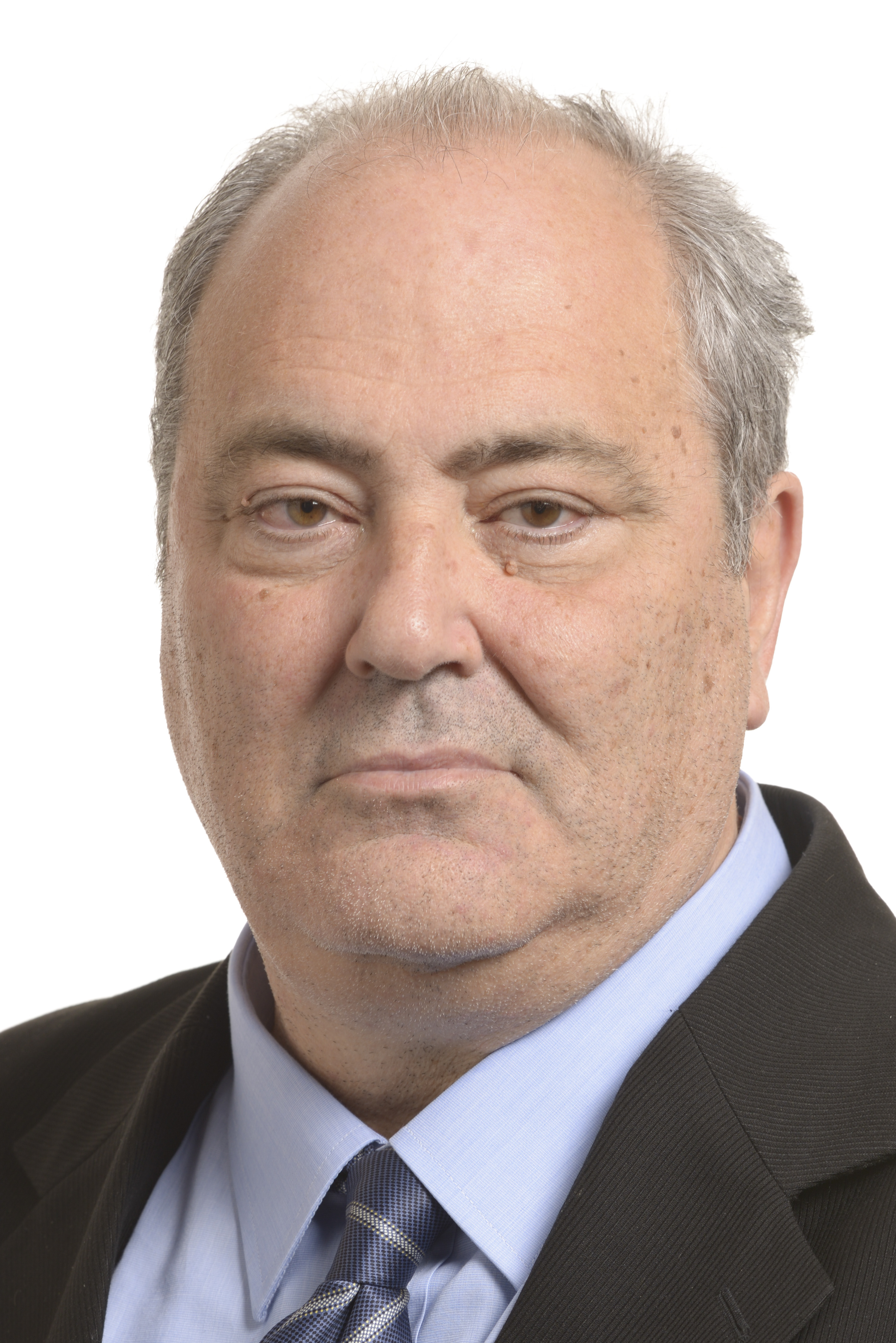

Coordinator of the Democratic Party
- In office 14 October 2007 – 17 February 2009
- Leader: Walter Veltroni
- Preceded by: Office established
- Succeeded by: Maurizio Migliavacca

Member of the European Parliament for Central Italy
- In office 1 July 2014 – 1 July 2019

Member of the Senate of the Republic
- In office 28 April 2006 – 28 November 2007
- Constituency: Lazio

Member of the Chamber of Deputies
- In office 30 May 2001 – 27 April 2006
- In office 14 September 1993 – 14 April 1994
- Constituency: Lazio

Personal details
- Born: 5 November 1952 (age 73) Rome, Italy
- Party: PCI (before 1991); PDS (1991–1998); DS (1998–2007); PD (since 2007)

Goffredo Maria Bettini (born 5 November 1952) is an Italian politician. He is a founding member of the Democratic Party (PD). As mentor and closest advisor of PD's former secretary Nicola Zingaretti, Bettini is considered one of the most influential and powerful politician within the party.

== Biography ==
Goffredo Maria Bettini was born in Rome in 1952; he is a descendant of the Rocchi Bettini Camerata Passionei Mazzoleni, an aristocratic family from Marche. During the 1970s, he joined in the Italian Communist Youth Federation (FGCI), where he met Walter Veltroni, to whom he will always be very close.

From 1977 to 1979, Bettini served as the Roman secretary of the FGCI and subsequently entered in the national secretariat of the federation, in the years in which Massimo D'Alema was serving national secretary. From 1986 to 1990, he was city secretary of the Italian Communist Party (PCI) in Rome and in 1989, he was elected municipal councilor with the PCI. He retained his two posts after the Bolognina turning point and the consequent birth of the Democratic Party of the Left (PDS). In 1993, he was elected to the Chamber of Deputies for the first time, taking over from the resigning Vincenzo Recchia.

In 1993, he was the strategist of Francesco Rutelli's candidacy for mayor of Rome, who was elected in the second round in December, defeating the right-wing candidate, Gianfranco Fini. In the 1994 general election, Bettini run in the single-member constituency of Rome–Prenestino–Centocelle, for the Chamber of Deputies, within the Alliance of Progressives, but he was not elected. In the 1996 general election, he run in the proportional lists for the Chamber of Deputies, and he failed in being elected.

In 1997, following Rutelli's second victory in the municipal election, Bettini was appointed responsible for institutional relations of the municipality; he resigned from this position after two years to become president of the Rome Auditorium. In the 2000 Lazio regional election, he arrived was elected in the regional council, for the Democrats of the Left (DS), the heir of the PDS. In 2001, he was re-elected to the Chamber and became a member of the national secretariat of the DS, while in the 2006 Italian general election, Bettini was elected senator for the first time.

On 4 November 2007, after the foundation of the Democratic Party (PD), Bettini was appointed party's coordinator of by the new secretary, Walter Veltroni. On 28 November 2007, he resigned from the office of senator to devote himself fully to party's activity. He held the office of coordinator until Veltroni's resignation in February 2009.

In 2014, he ran for the European election with the PD in the Central Italy constituency, being elected with 90,462 preferences. Since 2019, when Nicola Zingaretti was elected secretary of the PD, Bettini became one of the most influential politicians within the party, as well as his closest advisor.

== Electoral history ==
Election	House	Constituency	Party	Votes	Result
1992	Chamber of Deputies	Rome–Viterbo–Latina–Frosinone	PDS	8,102	Not elected (Note: Took over the seat on 14 September 1993.)
1994	Chamber of Deputies	Rome–Prenestino–Centocelle	PDS	34,228	Not elected
1996	Chamber of Deputies	Lazio 1	PDS	– (Note: Candidate in a closed list proportional representation system.)	Not elected
2001	Chamber of Deputies	Lazio 1	DS	–	Elected
2006	Senate of the Republic	Lazio	DS	–	Elected
2014	European Parliament	Central Italy	PD	90,462	Elected

=== First-past-the-post elections ===
1994 general election (C): Rome — Prenestino — Centocelle
Candidate	Party	Votes	%
Stefano Gaggioli	Pole of Good Government	36,079	45.0
Goffredo Bettini	Alliance of Progressives	34,228	42.7
Alberto Sabatini	Pact for Italy	7,366	9.2
Others		2,459	3.1
Total		80,132	100.0
