= Democrats Really =

Political faction in Italy

Democrats Really (Democratici Davvero) is a faction within the Democratic Party (PD), a political party in Italy.

The group, whose leader is Rosy Bindi, basically includes Christian left politicians and social democrats. They have been close supporters of Romano Prodi and wanted the party to stick to the tradition of The Olive Tree, along with the Olivists.

In the 2007 primary election for choosing the party leader, most Olivists, supported Rosy Bindi, along with Agazio Loiero's Southern Democratic Party and some members of The Populars, a loose association of former members of the Italian People's Party of which also Bindi was a member. The Olivists had their strongholds in Northern Italy, and especially in Veneto, Lombardy and Piedmont, but Bindi, who obtained 12.9% of the vote in the primary election nationally, had her best result in Calabria (31.3%) thanks to Loiero's support.

In July 2008 Bindi and her group (Giovanni Bachelet, Gianfranco Morgando, Roberto Zaccaria, Marina Magistrelli, Nando Dalla Chiesa) broke with the core Olivists, who were much more critical of the political line of Walter Veltroni's party leadership and of the lack of internal democracy within the party.

In the 2009 Democratic Party leadership election the faction supported Pier Luigi Bersani. Bersani won and Bindi was elected president of the party.
