= Olivists =

Olivists Ulivisti
- Leader: Romano Prodi
- Other members: Arturo Parisi; Rosy Bindi; Sandro Gozi; Gad Lerner; Vittorio Prodi
- Ideology: Progressivism; Christian left Social democracy Social liberalism
- Political position: Centre-left

The Olivists (Ulivisti) are a faction within the Democratic Party (PD), a political party in Italy.

The group includes both Christian left politicians, social democrats and social liberals. They have been close supporters of Romano Prodi, hence the term Prodiani, and want the party to be stuck in the tradition of The Olive Tree. The group, whose long-standing leader of the group has been Arturo Parisi, is the bulk of the former party of Prodi, The Democrats and of the former internal opposition within Democracy is Freedom – The Daisy.

The Olivists are keen supporters of the use of primary elections and the original idea of Democratic Party according to Prodi, a party open to all the centre-left forces or, at least, to an alliance with all them, including Italy of Values and the communist parties.

== History ==
=== Before the Democratic Party ===
Early groups of Ulivists were formed in 1995–1996, during the campaign for the 1996 general election, by close supporters of Romano Prodi who, as him, were not members of any party of The Olive Tree. Ulivists organized "Clubs for Prodi" and the "Citizens for The Olive Tree" association. Although most Ulivists took part to the campaign only as activists and remained grassroots supporters during Prodi II Cabinet, some were elected with the Italian People's Party–Democratic Union list called Populars for Prodi.

In 1998 Prodi lost a vote of confidence and was replaced by Massimo D'Alema as Prime Minister. D'Alema, along with Franco Marini, then leader of the Italian People's Party, pursued a political line aimed at strengthening the parties in spite of the coalition. In opposition to this, Prodi supporters, grassroots activists, disgruntled Populars and other groups (including The Network and Italy of Values) organized a new "Ulivist" party, The Democrats. Prodi led the party to a good result in the 1999 European Parliament election (7.7%). Some months later Prodi was nominated President of the European Commission and Arturo Parisi succeeded him as party leader.

In 2000 The Democrats agreed with other centrist parties, including the Italian People's Party, to form a joint list for the 2001 general election. The list, which gained a considerable success (14.5%), was transformed into a party in early 2002 under the name of Democracy is Freedom – The Daisy. Parisi was Vice President and President of the Federal Assembly of the party. The Olivists became soon the internal opposition to Francesco Rutelli within the party and were always strong supporters of the creation of a "Democratic Party". This actually happened with the foundation of the Democratic Party in 2007.

=== 2007 primary election ===
In the 2007 primary election for choosing the party leader, Olivists divided themselves in two groups: the left-wing, composed of the historical members of the faction, supported Rosy Bindi, while the moderates supported Enrico Letta, who is now leader of a separate group, the so-called Lettiani.

The supporters of Bindi included Arturo Parisi, Mario Barbi, Giulio Santagata, Sandra Zampa, Sandro Gozi, Franco Monaco, Marina Magistrelli, Gad Lerner, Gianfranco Morgando, Nando Della Chiesa, Vittorio Prodi, Roberto Zaccaria, Giovanni Bachelet, Franca Chiaromonte and Albertina Soliani. Bindi was supported also by Agazio Loiero and his Southern Democratic Party, as long as by some members of The Populars, a loose association of former members of the Italian People's Party of which both Bindi and Enrico Letta were members.

Olivists have their strongholds in Northern Italy, and especially in Veneto, Lombardy and Piedmont. However Bindi, who obtained 12.9% of the vote in the primary election nationally, had her best result in Calabria (31.3%) thanks to Loiero's support.

=== Opposition to Veltroni ===
In July 2008, the core Olivists broke with Bindi and her group (Bachelet, Morgando, Zaccaria, Magistrelli, Dalla Chiesa), who formed Democrats Really, a separate association. The reason of the separation was that Bindi was much less critical of PD leader Walter Veltroni and preferred to collaborate with him, instead of simply opposing him. On the other hand the Olivists (Parisi, Barbi, Recchia, Lerner, Zampa, Monaco, Gozi, Santagata) decided to continue their frontal opposition to Veltroni, especially denouncing his political line and the lack of internal democracy within the party.

In this respect, the Olivists, who are very marginalized in the PD and may even split from it, contrarily to most PD leading groups, want to continue the alliance with Italy of Values, Antonio Di Pietro's populist party, support some of his campaigns and are strongly fighting for "democracy within the parties", and especially within the PD.

In the 2009 Democratic Party leadership election, most Olivists supported Pier Luigi Bersani, although the faction did not officially support any candidate. Parisi finally voted for Dario Franceschini instead because of his support of primaries.

On 11 November, Parisi declared the experience of the Olivists closed, but they continue to act within the party as a loose group.

In the 2013 Democratic Party leadership election, most Olivists, including Parisi, supported Matteo Renzi, who was elected by a landslide.
