= Change Italy =

Political faction in Italy

Change Italy Cambia l'Italia
- Leader: Ignazio Marino
- Founded: 2010
- Dissolved: 2010
- Ideology: Social-democratic
- Political position: Centre-left
- National affiliation: Democratic Party

Change Italy (Cambia l'Italia) was a social-democratic faction within the Democratic Party (PD), a political party in Italy.

Its leader, Ignazio Marino, ran in the 2009 party's leadership election on a platform named "Live the PD, change Italy", gaining 12.5% of the vote and losing to Pier Luigi Bersani. The faction was structured in 2010, but soon after it ceased to exist. In 2013 Marino was elected Mayor of Rome and left national politics.
