= Cesare Damiano =

Italian politician

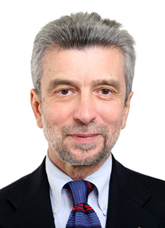

Italian Minister of Labour
- In office 17 May 2006 – 8 May 2008
- Prime Minister: Romano Prodi
- Preceded by: Roberto Maroni
- Succeeded by: Maurizio Sacconi

Member of the Chamber of Deputies
- In office 28 April 2006 – 22 March 2018

Personal details
- Born: 15 June 1948 (age 77) Cuneo, Italy
- Party: DS (2001–2007); PD (since 2007)

Cesare Damiano (born 15 June 1948 in Cuneo) is an Italian politician, member of the Democratic Party.

A former leading member of the CGIL trade union, Damiano has been a part of the Democrats of the Left national secretaryship since 2001. He is a former Minister of Labour.

== Biography ==
In 1970 Cesare Damiano enrolled in the FIOM-CGIL of which he was corporate representative, responsible for the work among the employees and officer (from 1974); in 1976 he entered the secretariat of the Fiom-CGIL of Turin and from 1980 to 1989 he was general secretary of the same syndicate in Piedmont. At the beginning of 1991 he became secretary general of the Chamber of Labor of Turin; in November of the same year he was appointed deputy general secretary of the FIOM and occupied this post until 1996. In March 2000 he was appointed General Secretary of the CGIL of Veneto, a position he held until December 2001, when he was elected to the National Secretariat of the Democrats of the Left.

In 2006 Damiano was appointed Minister of the Labour in the Prodi II Cabinet. He was also MP from 2006 to 2018. In the 2018 general election he has not been re-elected.
