= Maurizio Migliavacca =

Italian politician (born 1951)

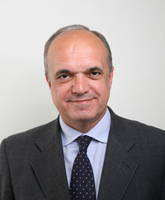

Coordinator of the Democratic Party
- In office 24 November 2009 – 15 December 2013

Member of the Chamber of Deputies
- In office 2006–2013
- In office 1996–2001
- Constituency: Emilia-Romagna

Member of the Senate
- In office 2013–2018
- Constituency: Emilia-Romagna

Personal details
- Born: 5 April 1951 (age 75) Fiorenzuola d'Arda, Italy
- Party: PCI (before 1991); PDS (1991-1998); DS (1994–2007); PD (2007-2017); Art1 (2017-2023)
- Education: University of Piacenza

Maurizio Migliavacca (born 5 April 1951 in Fiorenzuola d'Arda) is an Italian politician and the current Coordinator of the Democratic Party, the main center-left political party in Italy. He has been a member of the Italian Chamber of Deputies from 1996 to 2001 and since 2006.

== Biography ==
Migliavacca was born in Fiorenzuola d'Arda, a comune in the Arda valley, in the province of Piacenza, Emilia-Romagna region, Italy. He is graduated in political science and from 1990 to 1994 he was President of the Province of Piacenza. In 1996 Migliavacca was elected in the Italian Chamber of Deputies for Emilia-Romagna with the Democratic Party of the Left. In 2001 elections Migliavacca was not re-elected at the Chamber of Deputies, and later, in the 2006 elections he returned at the Chamber of Deputies with The Union led by Romano Prodi. Migliavacca was re-elected after two years in the 2008 elections. On 24 November 2009 he was nominated Coordinator of the Democratic Party.
