= Sandra Zampa =

Italian politician who sat in the Chamber of Deputies for the Democratic Party

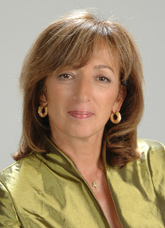

Member of the Senate
- Incumbent
- Assumed office 13 October 2022
- Constituency: Emilia Romagna

Member of the Chamber of Deputies
- In office 29 April 2008 – 22 March 2018
- Constituency: Emilia Romagna

Personal details
- Born: 16 May 1956 (age 70) Mercato Saraceno, Emilia-Romagna, Italy
- Party: Democratic Party
- Education: University of Bologna
- Profession: Journalist

Sandra Zampa (born 16 May 1956) is an Italian politician of the Democratic Party who has been serving as a member of the Senate since 2022.

Zampa previously sat in the Chamber of Deputies. She served as Undersecretary at the Ministry of Health from September 2019 to February 2021 in the midst of the COVID-19 pandemic, as part of the Conte II cabinet.

== Political career ==
In parliament, Zampa was part of a cross-party committee on child protection.

Zampa has been responsible for the response to the COVID-19 pandemic in Italy. She announced the purchase of many new ventilators as well as the importing of one and a half million masks from South Africa.

In addition to her role in the Chamber of Deputies and in the Senate, Zampa has served as a member of the Italian delegation to the Parliamentary Assembly of the Council of Europe from 2015 to 2018 and again since 2023. In this capacity, she has been a member of the Assembly's Committee on Migration, International Protection and Economic Co-operation.
