= Francesco Boccia =

Italian academic and politician (born 1968)

Francesco Boccia MP
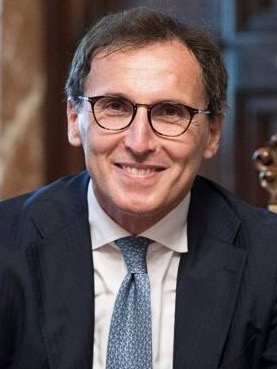

Minister of Regional Affairs and Autonomies
- In office 5 September 2019 – 13 February 2021
- Prime Minister: Giuseppe Conte
- Preceded by: Erika Stefani
- Succeeded by: Mariastella Gelmini

Member of the Senate
- Incumbent
- Assumed office 13 October 2022
- Constituency: Apulia

Member of the Chamber of Deputies
- In office 29 April 2008 – 13 October 2022
- Constituency: Apulia

Personal details
- Born: 18 March 1968 (age 58) Bisceglie, Italy
- Party: Democratic Party
- Spouse: Nunzia De Girolamo (m. 2011)
- Children: 3
- Education: University of Bari; Bocconi University
- Profession: Academic, Economist

Francesco Boccia (born 18 March 1968) is an Italian academic and politician of the Democratic Party (PD) who served as Minister of Regional Affairs and Autonomies in the government of Prime Minister Giuseppe Conte.

== Education and academic career ==
Boccia graduated from University of Bari with a degree in Political Sciences. In 1994, he obtained a Master of Business Administration from Bocconi University in Milan.

From 1994 to 1998 Boccia was a researcher at the European Institute, the Economic and Social Cohesion Laboratory of the London School of Economics. In 2002 he was Visiting Professor at the University of Illinois in Chicago, at the College of Public Administration. From 1998 to 2005 he was director of the Research Center for Land Development at the Carlo Cattaneo University of Castellanza. Since 2016 he has been president of the interdisciplinary Research Center on Governance and Public Policies at the University of Molise.

== Political career ==
Boccia worked as economic advisor to then Minister of Industry Enrico Letta from 1998 to 2001, and shortly thereafter joined The Daisy.

Boccia served as Councilor for the economy in the city of Bari from July 2004 to October 2006, and is considered to be very close to former mayor of Bari and president of Apulia Michele Emiliano.

During the Prodi II Cabinet, from 2006 to 2008, Boccia served as Head of the Department for the Development of Territorial Economies of the Presidency of the Council of Ministers, and was as well the liquidator commissioner and chairman of the extraordinary organ of liquidation of the financial instability of the city of Taranto.

In view of the 2005 regional elections, Boccia ran in the primary elections of The Union held on 16 January 2005 to decide who will be the candidate for president of Apulia: he was defeated by Nichi Vendola, who was then elected president of Apulia. He tried once again to run for the primaries in view of the 2010 regional elections, but was again defeated by Vendola.

Boccia was elected for the first time to the Chamber of Deputies in 2008, and was re-elected in 2013 and in 2018. In parliament, he chaired the Budget Committee.

In 2016, Boccia and Marco Meloni, an Italian lawyer and former deputy at the EU Parliament, presented their Summer Political School at the University of Bari, Italy. It was entitled to Enrico Letta. A year later, Meloni was appointed as its director.

== Personal life ==
Boccia had a long relationship with Benedetta Rizzo and the couple had a boy and a girl: Edoardo and Ludovica. In 2011 he married The People of Freedom politician Nunzia De Girolamo: the two had a daughter named Gea. He considers himself Roman Catholic.
