= Dalemiani =

Dalemiani referred to the followers of Massimo D'Alema, a former leading member of the Democratic Party, a political party in Italy.

The Dalemiani were generally social democrats who want the party to join the Party of European Socialists. D'Alema organized his faction as Reformists and Democrats, welcoming also some Lettiani and some Populars. Historic Dalemiani include Peppino Caldarola, Pier Luigi Bersani, Anna Finocchiaro, Nicola Latorre and Marco Minniti.

At the 2009 leadership election D'Alema supported Bersani. However, since his election, Bersani gained autonomy, so that journalists started to talk about Bersaniani.
