= Gianni Cuperlo =

Italian politician (born 1961)

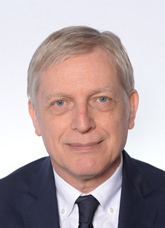

President of the Democratic Party
- In office 15 December 2013 – 21 January 2014
- Preceded by: Rosy Bindi
- Succeeded by: Matteo Orfini

Member of the Chamber of Deputies
- Incumbent
- Assumed office 13 October 2022
- In office 6 June 2006 – 22 March 2018

Personal details
- Born: 3 September 1961 (age 65) Trieste, Italy
- Party: PCI (till 1991); PDS (1991–1998); DS (1998–2007); PD (since 2007)
- Education: University of Bologna
- Profession: Politician

Giovanni "Gianni" Cuperlo (Italian pronunciation: [ˈdʒanni ˈkuːperlo]; born 3 September 1961) is an Italian politician, a member of the Italian Chamber of Deputies and former President of the Democratic Party.

== Biography ==
=== Early years ===
Gianni Cuperlo was born 3 September 1961 in Trieste. He attended the Francesco Petrarca lyceum, at which he first became interested in student politics. It was during this period that he first joined the Italian Communist Youth Federation (FGCI).

Following completion of his lyceum education in 1980, Cuperlo enrolled at the University of Bologna, from which he graduated with honors, having completed a bachelor's thesis on mass communications.

=== Radical youth leader ===
In 1985, following graduation from the University of Bologna, Cuperlo moved to Rome, where he became a functionary of the FGCI. He was elected national secretary of that organization in 1988 and was thus at the helm during the Revolutions of 1989 which led to the dismantling of the greater part of the world communist movement. Cuperlo was supportive of Communist Party of Italy (PCI) leader Achille Occhetto and his transformation of the historic PCI to a new organization called the Democratic Party of the Left.

Cuperlo and the Italian Communist Youth Federation followed in the footsteps of the adult party in October 1990, reestablishing itself as a broader organization called Sinistra Giovanile (Left Youth). Cuperlo remained as the national leader of the new organization.

=== Elected politician ===
Cuperlo's tenure at Sinistra Giovanile ended in 1992, when he aged out of the youth section to become a leader of the adult Democratic Party of the Left, which changed its name shortly thereafter to Democratici di Sinistra (Democrats of the Left). In 2001 Cuperlo was named to the governing National Secretariat of the new party, assuming the role of Director of Communications for the organization.

Cuperlo stood for election to the Chamber of Deputies (lower house) of the Italian parliament in the elections of 2006 and 2008, and was elected both times. At the time of his 2006 election, Cuperlo resigned as communications director of the Democratici di Sinistra to concentrate on parliament.

=== President of the Democratic Party ===
Cuperlo was a founding member of the Democratic Party, successor to Democrats of the Left, in 2007.

Following the victory in the primaries of the Democratic Party, Matteo Renzi offered Cuperlo, his challenger for the secretariat, the post of party chairman. After initially refusing, Cuperlo accepted the proposal. Therefore, in the National Assembly of the Democratic Party, he officially became the new president.

On 21 January 2014 Cuperlo resigned as chairman of the Democratic Party, stating disagreements with the party's direction as the reason.

=== Personal life ===
Apart from his obvious affinity for politics, Cuperlo is interested in literature, being particularly fond of American contemporary writers, including especially Joe R. Lansdale.

== Works ==
- Par condicio? Storia e futuro della politica in televisione. (A Level Playing Field? The History and Future of Politics in Television) Rome: Donzelli, 2004.
