= The Populars =

The Populars I Popolari
- President: Pierluigi Castagnetti
- Founded: 2002
- Preceded by: Italian People's Party
- Headquarters: Via del Gesù, 72 - 00186 Rome
- Ideology: Christian democracy Christian left
- Political position: Centre
- National affiliation: The Daisy (2002–2007); Democratic Party (since 2007)

Website
- associazionepopolari.it

The Populars (I Popolari) is a loose association within the Democratic Party (PD), a political party in Italy.

The Populars are the heirs of the Italian People's Party (PPI), a Christian-democratic party of the Christian left, and of the left wing of the Christian Democracy (DC). In 2002–2007 the Populars, led by Franco Marini and Ciriaco De Mita, were the majority faction within Democracy is Freedom – The Daisy, before merging into the PD. In the 2007 Democratic Party primary election around 600 Populars were elected to the party Constituent Assembly.

Leading members of the association have included Marini, De Mita (who left the PD over disagreements with party leader Walter Veltroni in early 2008), Pierluigi Castagnetti, Giuseppe Fioroni, Antonello Soro, Rosy Bindi, Enrico Letta and Dario Franceschini (deputy secretary of the party under Veltroni and, later, secretary). Bindi and Letta have been respectively leaders of Democrats Really and the 360 Association: their affiliation to The Populars is a further evidence of the looseness of the association. In this respect, Fioroni and Franceshini set up a more reliable faction called Fourth Phase: the name was chosen to identify the new stage of left-wing Catholics in Italian politics, the first three being within the Italian People's Party (1919–1926), DC (1943–1994) and the new PPI (1994–2002).

After the resignation of Veltroni as secretary and his replacement with Franceschini, the Populars of Fourth Phase chose to support Franceschini in the 2009 Democratic Party leadership election, while Letta and Bindi, as well as most Olivists and the Social Christians supported Pier Luigi Bersani. Franceschini thus organised his followers, including not only Populars but also several Veltroniani, into AreaDem. Most Populars later supported Matteo Renzi as party leader.
