= Giuseppe Fioroni =

Italian politician (born 1958)

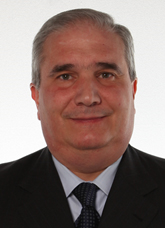

Minister of Education
- In office 17 May 2006 – 8 May 2008
- Prime Minister: Romano Prodi
- Preceded by: Letizia Moratti
- Succeeded by: Mariastella Gelmini

Personal details
- Born: 14 October 1958 (age 67) Viterbo, Italy
- Party: TN (since 2023)
- Other political affiliations: DC (until 1994); PPI (1994–2002); DL (2002–2007); PD (2007–2023)

Giuseppe Fioroni (born 14 October 1958), often nicknamed Beppe, is an Italian politician, and a former member of the Democratic Party (PD).

== Early life and education ==
Fioroni was born on 14 October 1958 in Viterbo. He is a graduate in medicine.

== Career ==
Fioroni served as a Christian Democrat Mayor of Viterbo from 1989 to 1995. He was first elected as a deputy in 1996, being re-elected for the third consecutive time in the 2006 election. He was formerly the Italian Minister of Education in the Prodi II Cabinet from 2006 to 2008. After leaving his post, he served as a shadow welfare minister for the Democratic Party.

Italian Chamber of Deputies
Unknown	Deputy for Constituency XVI, College 01 – Viterbo; 1996–2001	College abolished
Preceded by Title jointly held	Deputy for Constituency XXVI – Sardinia; 2001–2006	Succeeded by Title jointly held
Preceded by Title jointly held	Deputy for Constituency XVI – Lazio 2; 2006–2018	Succeeded by Title jointly held
Political offices
Preceded by Letizia Moratti	Italian Minister of Public Instruction; 2006–2008	Succeeded by Mariastella Gelmini
Party political offices
New title	Coordinator of the Democratic Party for Organization; 2007–2009	Title abolished
