= Free Democrats (Italy) =

The Free Democrats (Italian: Liberi Democratici, LD) were the centrist faction within the Democratic Party (PD), a political party in Italy, around Francesco Rutelli, former leader of Democracy is Freedom – The Daisy, one of the two main parties that merged to form the PD in 2007.

The faction was launched by Rutelli in June 2009 during a convention in Rome.

The group comprised both liberals and Christian democrats who wanted the PD to be modelled on the example of the United States Democratic Party and consider social democracy as obsolete in the 21st century. In fact the followers of Rutelli, the so-called Rutelliani, included both the secular-liberal faction of the late DL (Paolo Gentiloni, Ermete Realacci and his group of ecologists, Linda Lanzillotta, Gianni Vernetti, Roberto Giachetti, etc.), who represented the more free market-oriented wing of the PD, and the socially conservative Teodems (Paola Binetti, Luigi Bobba, Enzo Carra, Donato Mosella, etc.), who were on the right of the party on moral issues. As told, there was also a group of ecologists from Legambiente, the largest environmentalist association n Italy (Realacci, Roberto Della Seta, Francesco Ferrante, etc.).

This heterogeneity reflected the political trajectory of Rutelli, who entered politics as a Radical, then joined the Greens and finally became a devout Catholic and politically a centrist. Rutelli thus considered himself as a bridge between liberals and Christian democrats, and his conservative stances on advance health care directive, stem cell research and civil unions did not stop him from having a profitable dialogue with secularists and even with his former political godfather Marco Pannella, undisputed leader of the Italian Radicals.

During Walter Veltroni's leadership of the party, some Rutelliani (such as Gentiloni and Realacci) seemed to distance from Rutelli, who was taking a more conservative approach. Moreover, some of them even took part to the foundation of other factions, such as Liberal PD (Gentiloni, Lanzillotta, Vernetti, etc.) and the Democratic Ecologists (Realacci, Della Seta, Ferrante, etc.), also because Rutelli decided not to organize his faction after the 2007 Democratic Party leadership election. However, after Veltroni's departure from party leadership, Rutelli was able to rally again all his followers within the Free Democrats.

In the 2009 Democratic Party leadership election the faction supported Dario Franceschini as party leader. In the aftermath of the election, which saw the victory of Pier Luigi Bersani, Francesco Rutelli and a large portion of the faction left the party in order to set up an independent party, Alliance for Italy. The faction thus ceased to exist. In September 2010 the former Rutelliani remained in the PD joined Veltroni's Democratic Movement.
