= Rutelliani =

Rutelliani referred to the followers of Francesco Rutelli, a former leading member of the Democratic Party, and later leader of Alliance for Italy. The followers of Rutelli were mainly centrists who wanted the party to be modelled on the Democratic Party of the United States and to join the Alliance of Liberals and Democrats for Europe and the Alliance of Democrats. They included both liberals and Christian-democrats.

Some groups considered close to Rutelli were:

- Liberal PD (also close to Walter Veltroni)
- Democratic Ecologists (also close to Walter Veltroni)
- Teodem/Persons and Networks

Originally Rutelliani were the secular-liberal faction within Democracy is Freedom – The Daisy, including Paolo Gentiloni, Ermete Realacci, Linda Lanzillotta, Gianni Vernetti and Roberto Giachetti. During Veltroni's leadership, some of these people, including Gentiloni (now one of the leaders of Liberal PD) and Realacci, distanced from Rutelli, who took a more conservative approach, and became Veltroniani.

However, in June 2009 all Rutelliani, including Gentiloni and Realacci, rallied again around Rutelli and joined his new association, the Free Democrats and chose to support the candidacy of Dario Franceschini in the 2009 Democratic Party leadership election. In the aftermath of the election, which saw the victory of Pier Luigi Bersani, Rutelli and a large portion of the faction left the party in order to set up an independent party, Alliance for Italy. Some Rutelliani, including Gentiloni and Realacci, chose to remain in the PD and, since September 2010, were part of Veltroni's Democratic Movement.
