= Democratic Movement (Italy) =

Political faction in Italy

Democratic Movement (Movimento Democratico, MoDem) is a faction within the Democratic Party (PD), a political party in Italy.

At the 2009 leadership election Dario Franceschini was defeated by Pier Luigi Bersani. Those who supported the former's bid joined forces into AreaDem, a broad minority faction which comprised several groups: Veltroniani, Fassiniani, Fourth Phase, Liberal PD, Democratic Ecologists, Simply Democrats, etc.

By September 2010, both Franceschini and Piero Fassino had re-approached with Bersani, a move which was not approved by Walter Veltroni and Giuseppe Fioroni, who chose to form a "movement" in order to defend the "original spirit" of the PD. In doing this they were supported by 75 deputies: 33 Veltroniani, 35 Populars close to Fioroni and 7 former Rutelliani led by Paolo Gentiloni. The new faction was named Democratic Movement.

Gero Grassi, right-hand man of Fioroni, is the president of the association.

== Leadership ==
- President: Gero Grassi (2011–...)
