= Luigi Viviani =

Italian politician and trade unionist

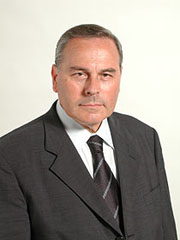

Senator of the Italian Republic
- Parliamentary group: Democrats of the Left - The Olive Tree
- Constituency: Veneto, 16 (Verona Cittadella)

State Secretary of the Ministry of Labor and Social Security
- In office 22 October 1998 – 21 December 1999
- Prime Minister: Massimo D'Alema
- Preceded by: Elena Montecchi
- Succeeded by: Rosario Olivo

Personal details
- Born: 22 October 1937 (age 88) Verona
- Party: Democratic Party (Italy)
- Other political affiliations: Social Christians
- Profession: Trade unionist
- Known for: Co-founding the Social Christians
- Committees: Legislature XIII; member of the IV Defence Commission (10 February 2000 – 25 April 2000) (replacing the Undersecretary of State Giuseppe Maria Ayala until 25 April 2000), (23 May 2000 – 29 May 2001) (replacing the State Secretary Ornella Piloni until 29 May 2001); member of the Fifth Budget Committee (30 May 1996 – 3 November 1998, 10 February 2000 – 29 May 2001); member of the XIII Standing Committee on Territory, Environment and Environmental Heritage (4 November 1998 – 9 February 2000) (replaced by Angelo Staniscia until 21 December 1999); member of parliament's committee on regional affairs (16 October 1996 – 6 May 1999); member of the parliamentary advisory committee on the reform of the state budget pursuant to law no. 94 of 3 April 1997 (9 May 1997 – 29 May 2001); Legislature XIV; member of the XI Standing Committee on Labour, Social Security (22 June 2001 – 27 April 2006)
- Website: https://www.senato.it/leg/14/BGT/Schede/Attsen/00003880.htm

Luigi Viviani (Verona, 22 October 1937) is an Italian politician and trade unionist, actively involved in various national and local political activities and in the political fabric of Verona.

== Biography ==
During the 1980s Viviani was a member of the general secretariat of the Italian Confederation of Workers' Trade Unions during the secretariat of Pierre Carniti. In 1993 he co-founded the movement of the Social Christians with Ermanno Gorrieri, Pierre Carniti and other political exponents. He then became a senator of the Republic for two legislatures. During the 1996–2001 legislature he was Undersecretary for Labour with Minister Cesare Salvi; in the next legislature (2001–2006) he was vice-president of the Democrats of the Left group in the Senate.
