= Shadow Cabinet of Italy (2008) =

A Shadow Cabinet of Italy had been announced on 15 April 2008, by Walter Veltroni, Secretary of the Democratic Party, after the 2008 Italian general election and officially presented on 9 May.

The new party Secretary Dario Franceschini announced on 21 February 2009 that he will dissolve the Shadow Cabinet.

Portfolio	Shadow Minister
Shadow President of the Council	Walter Veltroni
Shadow Vice President of the Council	Enrico Morando
Shadow Spokesman of the Council	Riccardo Franco Levi
Shadow Minister of Foreign Affairs	Piero Fassino
Shadow Minister of the Interior	Marco Minniti
Shadow Minister of Justice	Lanfranco Tenaglia
Shadow Minister of Economy	Pierluigi Bersani
Shadow Ministry of Education, Universities and Research	Maria Pia Garavaglia
Shadow Minister of Industry	Matteo Colaninno
Shadow Minister of Welfare	Enrico Letta
Shadow Minister of Defense	Roberta Pinotti
Shadow Minister of Agriculture	Alfonso Andria
Shadow Minister of Environment	Ermete Realacci
Shadow Minister of Infrastructures and Transports	Andrea Martella
Shadow Minister for Cultural Assets and Activities	Vincenzo Cerami
Shadow Minister without portfolio (Communications)	Giovanna Melandri
Shadow Minister without portfolio (Reforms)	Sergio Chiamparino
Shadow Minister without portfolio (Regional Affairs)	Mariangela Bastico
Shadow Minister without portfolio (Public Administration and Innovation)	Linda Lanzillotta
Shadow Minister without portfolio (Equal Opportunities)	Vittoria Franco
Shadow Minister without portfolio (Normative Simplification)	Beatrice Magnolfi
Shadow Minister without portfolio (European Affairs)	Maria Paola Merloni
Shadow Minister without portfolio (Platform Accomplishment)	Michele Ventura
Shadow Minister without portfolio (Youth)	Pina Picierno
