= Reformist Popular Centre =

Coalition of centrist political parties in Friuli-Venezia Giulia

The Reformist Popular Centre (Italian: Centro Popolare Riformatore, CPR) was a centrist coalition active in Friuli-Venezia Giulia from 1998 to 2003.

The coalition was launched for the 1998 regional election and comprised five parties:

- Italian People's Party (PPI)
- Democratic Union for the Republic (UDR)
- Italian Renewal (RI)
- Italian Republican Party (PRI)
- Slovene Union (SS)

At the time of the foundation of CPR, it was seen as a political laboratory for the country, in order to put together centrist parties of The Olive Tree, the then-governing centre-left coalition. Leading national politicians, including Franco Marini, Clemente Mastella, Rocco Buttiglione, Lamberto Dini and Giorgio La Malfa.

In the regional election CPR won 11.0% and 7 regional deputies, but it failed to form an alliance with Forza Italia and Lega Nord Friuli-Venezia Giulia, due to difficulties in forming a new regional government and to internal divisions. Isidoro Gottardo was elected leader of the group.

By the 2003 regional election the coalition was over, with most members who had joined Democracy is Freedom – The Daisy (DL) and Isidoro Gottardo Forza Italia. DL was in fact a sort of continuation of CPR at the national level.
