= 2009 Democratic Party (Italy) leadership election =

2009 election of the leader of the Democratic Party of Italy

2009 Democratic Party leadership election
- 25 October 2009
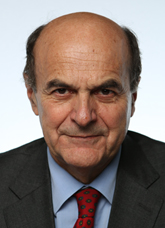

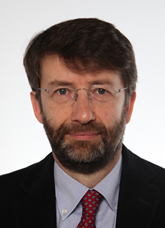

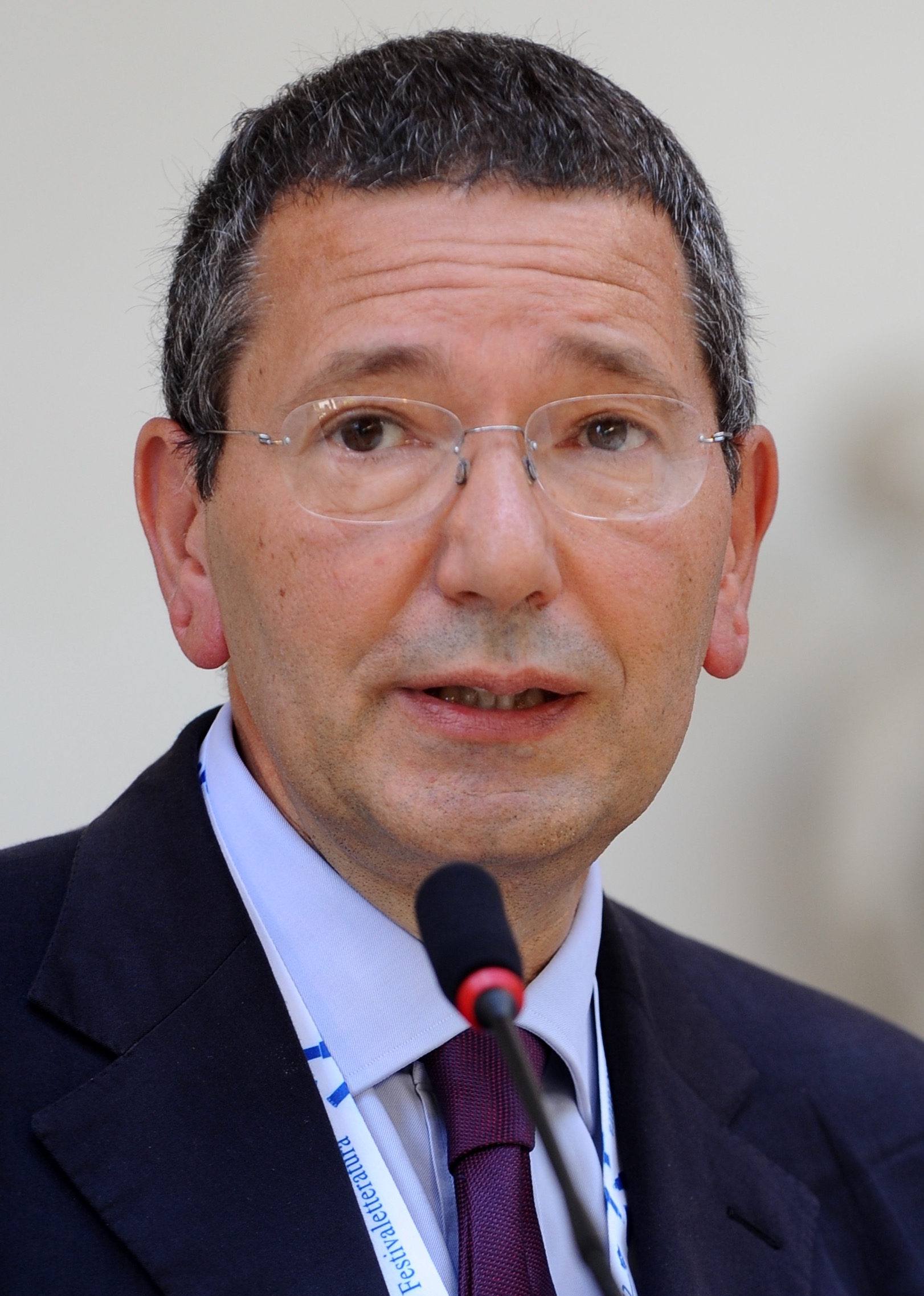
Nominee	Pier Luigi Bersani	Dario Franceschini	Ignazio Marino
Delegate count	530	339	131
Popular vote	1,623,239	1,045,123	380,904
Percentage	53.2%	34.3%	12.5%
Secretary before election
Dario Franceschini
Elected Secretary
Pier Luigi Bersani

The 2009 Democratic Party leadership election was held in July–November 2009, following the resignation of Walter Veltroni in February 2009, after 16 months as secretary of the Democratic Party (PD), a political party in Italy.

Pier Luigi Bersani, a former minister in several centre-left governments hailing from the Italian Communist Party (then Democratic Party of the Left and Democrats of the Left), was elected secretary in an open primary on 25 October. Three million Democratic supporters turned out to vote and it was a real fight between three candidates, with Bersani winning with only 53% of the votes cast.

Bersani was declared new secretary of the party during the first meeting of the party's new national assembly elected on 7 November 2009. On that occasion Rosy Bindi was elected president of the party (with Marina Sereni and Ivan Scalfarotto vice-presidents), while Enrico Letta and Antonio Misiani were nominated deputy-secretary and treasurer, respectively.

== Background and rules ==
Veltroni, a former leader of the Democrats of the Left and Deputy Prime Minister in Prodi I Cabinet, was elected in an open primary election in 2007 by a landslide, but left the post of leader after a series of electoral defeats one and a half years before the natural conclusion of his term. He was replaced by his deputy, Dario Franceschini, a former left-wing Christian Democrat hailing from Democracy is Freedom – The Daisy.

Candidates were required to present their candidacies by 31 July 2009. From that point til the end of September party members voted in local conventions, choosing between the candidates and electing the delegates for the national convention. Under party rules the candidates who receive the support of at least the 15% of voting party members in local conventions or in any case the three most voted candidates, provided that they had received at least 5% of the vote, qualify for the second round of the race and have the chance to present their platform at the national convention.

After the national convention, that was scheduled on 11 October, the selected candidates stood in an open primary election, held on 25 October, with all Italian citizens aged at least 16 and non-Italian legal residents being eligible to vote. Voters elected also the national assembly of the party and the regional secretaries and assemblies. If no candidate was to get more than 50% of the vote, a run-off between the two most voted candidates would have taken place in the national assembly, scheduled within two weeks from the primary election.

== Candidates ==
Three candidates ran for secretary:

- Dario Franceschini (campaign website) — Franceschini, a former left-wing Christian Democrat and outgoing secretary, who announced his candidacy on 24 June, presented himself as the heir of Veltroni's political line, that basically meant vocazione maggioritaria and extensive use of primaries. He was thus supported by most Veltroniani, the bulk of The Populars, Francesco Rutelli's Free Democrats and their sister-factions (Democratic Ecologists, Liberal PD and Teodems) as well as some elements of the party's left-wing and also the Simply Democrats list. Among party heavyweights, other than Veltroni, Rutelli and Franco Marini, Franceschini was supported by Piero Fassino, former leader of the Democrats of the Left, who coordinated his campaign.
- Pier Luigi Bersani (campaign website) — Several times minister, Bersani, who announced his bid on 1 July, represented essentially the more social-democratic wing of the party in the PCI/PDS/DS tradition, and he was indeed supported by Dalemiani (Massimo D'Alema and his Reformists and Democrats group), To the Left and Democracy and Socialism. However, Bersani, who stood for a PD set in the tradition of The Olive Tree and was open to an alliance with other parties both on the party's left and right, obtained the support of Romano Prodi's Olivists (although not that of Arturo Parisi who supported Franceschini instead), Rosy Bindi's Democrats Really and the 360 Association, whose leader Enrico Letta was a keen centrist. Bersani, whose party would rely more on activists than primaries, was supported by many Northerners who wanted a strong party with a federal structure and a strong organization, in order to compete with Lega Nord. These included Filippo Penati, who served as coordinator of Bersani's campaign.
- Ignazio Marino (campaign website) — Marino, well-known surgeon and senator, stepped into the leadership race on 4 July. He was supported by the very socially liberal wing of the party regarding ethical issues, disgruntled Dalemiani (as Marino himself is) and some Veltroniani led by Goffredo Bettini, a senator who was the closest aide to Veltroni during his leadership and who was not interested in supporting Franceschini.

The candidacy of Marino might have prompted an alternative bid of Paola Binetti, leader of the socially conservative Teodems, but she finally chose to support Franceschini, along with Rutelli, as also Ermete Realacci, leader of the Democratic Ecologists did.

Mario Adinolfi, a former Christian Democrat, journalist and blogger who ran also in 2007 (gaining a mere 0.2%), announced his candidacy on 30 June, proposing "direct democracy" and a "radical renewal", but finally withdrew in favour of Franceschini.

Renato Nicolini, architect, university professor and former culture councillor of Rome under three Communist mayors (1976–1985), announced his bid on 21 July, but he later withdrew from the race after failing to collect the required signatures in support of his bid.

Beppe Grillo, popular comedian and blogger, announced his bid on 12 July, but its candidacy was rejected by the party's electoral commission.

== Opinion polls ==
According to an opinion poll taken on 13 July 2009 by Crespi Ricerche, a 33.4% of Democratic voters would have voted in the primary election. Under the same poll, Franceschini was backed by a 27.1% of respondents, Bersani by a 25.4%, Grillo by a 19.8% and Marino by a 15.2%; a 12.5% was undecided.

Another poll by IPR Marketing, published on 11 August, put Bersani largely ahead with 54%, Franceschini distant second with 35% and Marino third with 11%. According to this poll a 56% of Democratic voters (that is to say 19% of the whole electorate) are likely or sure to go to the polls.

A poll published by Crespi Ricerche on 10 September put Bersani and Franceschini neck and neck, respectively at 43.7% and 39.6%, with Marino distant third with 9.2% and 7.5% of voters who declared themselves as undecided.

== Results ==
=== Vote by party members ===
On 8 October 2009 the party's electoral commission released the results of the vote among party members. In the local congresses a 56.4% of party members got out and vote. Bersani was by far the most voted candidate with 55.1% of the vote, largely ahead of Franceschini (37.0%) and Marino (7.9%).

Candidates	Votes	%
Pier Luigi Bersani	255,189	55.1
Dario Franceschini	171.041	37.0
Ignazio Marino	36.674	7.9
Total	462,904	100.0

Source: Democratic Party Electoral Commission

Vote by party members
Bersani	55.1%
Franceschini	37.0%
Marino	7.9%

=== Primary election ===
On 25 October 2009 more than 3 million voters turned out to vote in an open primary. Bersani was elected new secretary of the party with 53.2% of the popular vote, Franceschini came second with 34.3% and Marino third with 12.5%.

The following results refer to the 100% of ballots counted:

Candidates	Votes	%	Delegates
Pier Luigi Bersani	1,603,531	53.2	530
Dario Franceschini	1,035,026	34.3	339
Ignazio Marino	378,211	12.5	131
Total	3,016,768	100.0	1,000

Sources: Democratic Party Electoral Commission, La Repubblica and La Stampa

Popular vote
Bersani	53.2%
Franceschini	34.2%
Marino	12.5%

=== Delegates summary ===
Portrait	Name	Logo	Delegates
	Pier Luigi Bersani		530/1000 (53%)
	Dario Franceschini		339/1000 (34%)
	Ignazio Marino		131/1000 (13%)
