= Teodem =

- Ideology: Christian democracy Christian left Social conservatism
- Political position: Centre

Teodem (translatable as Theo-Democrats) is a Christian-democratic faction with the Italian Democratic Party, which combines social-conservative views on ethical issues with a Christian leftist approach on economic issues.

In the run-up of the 2006 general election Francesco Rutelli, leader of Democracy is Freedom – The Daisy, recruited some devout Catholics, notably Paola Binetti (president of the committee against the referendum on limiting the restrictions to artificial insemination) and Luigi Bobba (leader of the "Christian Associations of Italian Workers", a leading Catholic association), to run in party lists for the Senate, in order to balance the choice of a joint-list with the left-wing Democrats of the Left for the Chamber of Deputies.

In the 2006–2008 parliamentary term three senators (Luigi Bobba, Patrizia Binetti and Emanuela Baio Dossi) and three deputies (Dorina Bianchi, Enzo Carra and Marco Calgaro) were affiliated to the Theo-Dems. Due to the razor-thin majority of The Union in the Senate, they sometimes held the balance. After some initial criticism, they decided to follow Rutelli into the Democratic Party, born with the merger of Democracy is Freedom with the Democrats of the Left. During the parliamentary term Theo-Dems were joined by other Catholic MPs close to Rutelli, including two former leading members of the Association of Italian Catholic Guides and Scouts, Cristina De Luca and Luigi Lusi.

In the current parliamentary term, started with the 2008 general election, the group was originally composed of five deputies (Paola Binetti, Luigi Bobba, Enzo Carra, Marco Calgaro and Donato Mosella) e six senators (Benedetto Adragna, Emanuela Baio Dossi, Egidio Banti, Dorina Bianchi, Luigi Lusi e Antonino Papania), all close to Rutelli so that they are considered to be part of the so-called rutelliani.

In October 2008 some Theo-Dems, along with other Catholic MPs close to Rutelli, notably including Renzo Lusetti, launched a new association named Persons and Networks (PeR). It is not yet clear if it will replace the current association or not.

In the 2009 Democratic Party leadership election the group supported Dario Franceschini, through the adhesion to Rutelli's Free Democrats. In October, however, Binetti, offended by some remarks by Franceschini over her positions on homophobia, she hinted that she was going to vote for Pier Luigi Bersani. In November 2009 some Theo-Dems (including Marco Calgaro) left the PD in order to join Rutelli's new party, Alliance for Italy, while in January–February 2010 Enzo Carra, Renzo Lusetti and finally Paola Binetti joined the Union of the Centre instead, citing the PD's endorsement to Emma Bonino, a secularist Radical, as centre-left candidate in the Lazio regional election. After these splits, the Theo-Dems, led by Luigi Bobba, are thus a tiny minority within the PD, composed of one deputy and five senators. Without Binetti and Carra the future of the faction is anyway unclear.
