= Social Christians =

Social Christians Cristiano Sociali
- Secretary: Mimmo Lucà
- President: Pierre Carniti
- Founded: 1993
- Dissolved: 1998 (as political party)
- Split from: Christian Democracy; Italian Socialist Party
- Merged into: Democrats of the Left
- Ideology: Social democracy Christian socialism Christian left
- National affiliation: Democratic Party
- International affiliation: International League of Religious Socialists
- Colours: Pink

Website
- www.cristianosociali.it

The Social Christians (Italian: Cristiano Sociali) are a Christian social-democratic faction within the Democratic Party, a political party in Italy. Before that, they were a party (1993–1998) and a faction of the Democrats of the Left (1998–2007).

The CS are a member of the International League of Religious Socialists (ILRS).

== History ==
The group was founded as a party by trade-union leader Pierre Carniti and economist Ermanno Gorrieri in 1993, in order to represent Christian leftists and socialists within the nascent Alliance of Progressives.

In the 1994 general election the party was included in the Democratic Party of the Left and obtained eight deputies and six senators, while in the 1996 general election five deputies (including Mimmo Lucà and Methodist pastor Domenico Maselli) and four senators won election.

In 1998 the CS fully joined the Democrats of the Left (DS) and were later a faction within that party.

In 2007 the CS were keen supporters of the merger of the DS into the Democratic Party and in first leadership election most of them supported Walter Veltroni. In the 2009 leadership election the faction chose to support Pier Luigi Bersani, while two former leading members, Giorgio Tonini and Stefano Ceccanti, who had been Veltroni's close allies, supported Dario Franceschini.

After the 2001 and 2006 general elections, the faction continued to have at least four deputies and senators, although lately the faction's strength has been reduced.

== Leadership ==
- Coordinator: Pierre Carniti (1993–1999), Giorgio Tonini (1999–2003), Mimmo Lucà (2003–present)
- President: Ermanno Gorrieri (1993–1999), Pierre Carniti (1999–2003)
