= Democratic Ecologists =

Democratic Ecologists Ecologisti Democratici
- Leaders: Ermete Realacci; Fabrizio Vigni; Alessandro Bratti
- Founded: 2007
- Ideology: Green politics Ecologism
- Political position: Centre-left

The Democratic Ecologists (Italian: Ecologisti Democratici, EcoDem or ED) are a green faction within the Italian Democratic Party (PD).

Launched by Ermete Realacci and Fabrizio Vigni, the faction is composed by both former members of Democracy is Freedom – The Daisy (Realacci, Roberto Della Seta, Francesco Ferrante, etc.) and the Democrats of the Left (Vigni, Sergio Gentili, Gianni Mattioli, Edo Ronchi, Massimo Scalia, etc.). Most of these people were once members of the Federation of the Greens who left it between 1999 and 2004, after Luigi Manconi (who also joined the Democrats) left the party's leadership and the Greens experienced a far-left political transformation under Grazia Francescato and Alfonso Pecoraro Scanio.

The EcoDem fought the election for the Constituent Assembly of the Democratic Party on 14 October 2007 within the Environment, Innovation, Labour list, led by Realacci along with Giovanna Melandri and Luigi Nicolais. The list scored 8.1% at the election and the EcoDem elected more than 100 delegates to the Assembly. Following this promising result, Realacci and Della Seta were appointed by PD leader Walter Veltroni heads of Communication and Environment departments, respectively.

During a convention named "Get-things-done Environmentalism" (Ambientalismo del fare) on 26–27 January 2008, the EcoDem presented their core proposals about environmental issues, including their idea of transforming Italy into "the country of solar energy". The convention, organized by the EcoDem in cooperation with the Environment department of the party, was attended by Veltroni, Joschka Fischer and Ségolène Royal.

In the 2009 leadership election the faction supported Dario Franceschini.

In the 2013 general election very few EcoDem were included in the party's lists and only Realacci was elected, however, after the election, other Democrats joined the faction. These included Alessandro Bratti, who was elected president of the faction in July 2014.

== Leadership ==
- President: Fabrizio Vigni (2007–2014), Alessandro Bratti (2014–present)
- Honorary President: Fabrizio Vigni (2014–present)
