= Religious Social Democrats of Sweden =

Swedish religious political organization

Socialdemocrats for Faith and Solidarity (Swedish: Socialdemokrater för tro och solidaritet [sʊsɪˈɑ̂ːldɛmʊˌkrɑːtɛr fœr ˈtruː ɔ(k) sʊlɪdarɪˈteːt, - fœ ˈʈruː -]), formerly the Swedish Association of Christian Social Democrats (Swedish: Sveriges kristna socialdemokraters förbund, commonly known as Broderskapsrörelsen, "the Brotherhood Movement") organizes religious members of the Swedish Social Democratic Party. The organization was founded in 1929 as an organization for Christian social democrats. Since 2011, it has been open for members of all religions. It is an associate member of the International League of Religious Socialists.

The former Prime Minister of Sweden Göran Persson is a member of the organization.

== List of chairpersons ==
- Bertil Mogård, 1929–1954
- Åke Zetterberg, 1954–1968
- Evert Svensson, 1968–1986
- Georg Andersson, 1986–1990
- Torgny Larsson, 1990–1992
- Berndt Ekholm, 1992–1999
- Anna Berger Kettner, 1999–2005
- Peter Weiderud, 2005–2015
- Ulf Bjereld, 2015–2020
- Sara-Kukka Salam, 2020–present

== Controversy ==
The Swedish Association of Christian Social Democrats has received criticism for its cooperation with various alleged Islamist and anti-Zionist groups and people. In November 2005 the organization together with the Social Democratic Students of Sweden and the Muslim Council of Sweden invited the Palestinian-British academic Azzam Tamimi to hold a speech at a seminar at the Stockholm Mosque entitled Islam and Democratic Development (Swedish: Islam och demokratiutveckling). Tamimi has referred to Israel as a "cancer" and expressed support for the violent struggle of Hamas and Hezbollah against Israel.

In March 2007, the Swedish Association of Christian Socialdemocrats together with the workers' educational association ABF and the journal Folket i Bild/Kulturfront invited the Israeli-born activist and musician Gilad Atzmon to hold a speech at a seminar in Stockholm entitled Iraq, Palestine and Afghanistan: same occupation? (Swedish: Irak, Palestina och Afghanistan: Samma ockupation?). The invitation led to strong criticism from the chairman of the Swedish Committee Against Antisemitism (SKMA), who called Atzmon a "notorious anti-Semite". In a reply, Ulf Carmesund of the Swedish Association of Christian Social Democrats countered that SKMA is on a dangerous path, devaluing the whole concept of antisemitism, when they attempt to apply the term to antizionism. Atzom is critical of Israel's policies and of organizations that spuriously support Israel in the name of all Jews. Scholar at Lund University Sameh Egyptson criticize "the Brotherhood Movement" for its cooperation with The Muslim Council of Sweden, SMR over which the Muslim Brotherhood has an influence. In this collaboration, it had been agreed that activists in SMR should be included in social democratic electoral lists for the Swedish parliament, the county council and municipalastes.

In the summer of 2006, the priest Tommy Sandberg decided to leave the organization. According to the newspaper Dagen, one of the main reasons was that the organization "turns a blind eye to antisemitic occurrences" (Swedish: "ser mellan fingrarna på antisemitiska företeelser".).

== See also ==
- Christian socialism
- Christian left
