= Ignazio Marino =

Italian politician

Ignazio Marino MEP
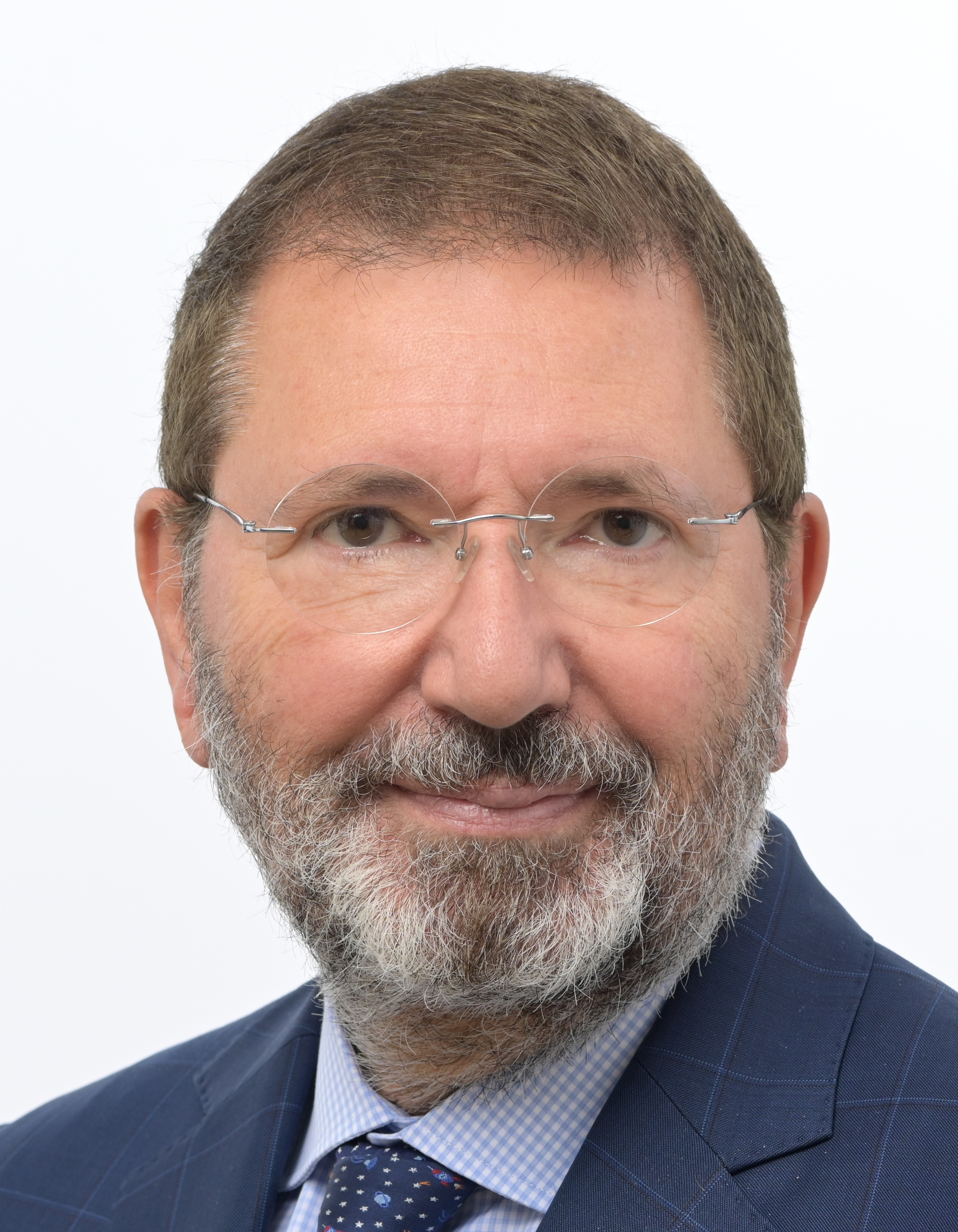
- Official portrait, 2024

Mayor of Rome
- In office 12 June 2013 – 31 October 2015
- Preceded by: Gianni Alemanno
- Succeeded by: Virginia Raggi

Member of the Senate
- In office 28 April 2006 – 22 May 2013
- Constituency: Lazio (2006–2013); Piedmont (2013)

Member of the European Parliament for Central Italy
- Incumbent
- Assumed office 16 July 2024

Personal details
- Born: Ignazio Roberto Maria Marino; 10 March 1955 (age 71) Genoa, Italy
- Party: AVS (2024–present); Greens/EFA (2024–present)
- Other political affiliations: DS (2006–2007); PD (2007–2015); Independent (2015–2024)
- Education: Università Cattolica del Sacro Cuore
- Profession: Surgeon, University professor

Ignazio Roberto Maria Marino (pronounced [iɲˈɲattsjo maˈriːno]; born 10 March 1955) is an Italian transplant surgeon who was Mayor of Rome from 2013 to 2015.

As a surgeon, he trained with Thomas Starzl, who had pioneered liver transplantation in humans. In 1992–1993, as a member of Thomas Starzl's team at the University of Pittsburgh in the United States, he conducted two baboon-to-human liver transplants. He founded the ISMETT organ transplant centre in Palermo, Sicily; Marino was the CEO and the Director of ISMETT from 1997 until 2002. In 2001, he performed the first organ transplant in Italy for a person with HIV. The patient lived for 18 years with full function of the transplanted organ. As a civil rights activist, on October 18, 2014, as Mayor of Rome, Marino registered the marriages of 16 same-sex couples. Same-sex marriages were illegal in Italy at the time, and by registering the marriages, Mayor Marino wanted to force the hand of national legislators to clarify a deepening legal muddle around same-sex unions. Same-sex civil unions were eventually legalized in Italy in 2016.

In the United States, he has held chairs as Professor of Surgery at the University of Pittsburgh and at the Thomas Jefferson University in Philadelphia.

From 2009 to 2015, he was a member of the centre-left Democratic Party and held a seat in the Italian Senate from 2006 until his election as mayor of Rome. He was elected Mayor of Rome in June 2013. Shortly after his victory in the elections, he was approached by an organized crime network that rigged public contracts and embezzled funds. Marino took the case to prosecutors, starting the 2014 Rome corruption scandal. In 2015, at the beginning of October, the opposition parties of M5S and Fratelli d'Italia, started a false scandal against Mayor Marino. On 12 October 2015, Marino resigned from the Office of Mayor to prove his innocence. Subsequently, on 29 October, he submitted his resignation. Nevertheless, on 30 October, he was ousted from his position after 26 of the 48 members of the City Council resigned. On 7 October 2016, the Judge of Preliminary Hearing of Rome (G.U.P. Roma) acquitted Prof. Marino at the first instance over the allegations of embezzlement, fraud, and forgery. On 9 April 2019, the Italian Supreme Court (Corte di Cassazione) definitively confirmed the first acquittal. It stated that the Mayor's expenses were made in the interests of Rome for institutional aims and that the alleged facts "did not take place" according to article 530 of the Italian C.P.P., ruling that even the opening of the investigation was not necessary.

Currently, Ignazio Marino is Professor of Surgery at Thomas Jefferson University, School of Medicine, and holds the role of Executive Vice President for both Thomas Jefferson University and Jefferson Health.

== Early life and education ==
Marino was born in Genoa to a Sicilian father and a Swiss mother and is the oldest of three children (he has two sisters). He graduated in Medicine and Surgery from the Università Cattolica del Sacro Cuore in Rome.

== Medical career ==
Board-certified in General and Vascular Surgery, he spent 4 years training in the 2 most prestigious transplant centres in the world: the Transplantation Institute of the University of Cambridge, England (then the only liver transplantation division in Europe), directed by Prof. Sir Roy Calne. During his time in Cambridge, Dr. Marino published a paper on the reperfusion syndrome occurring during liver transplantation (Transplantation, 1985). The paper is still quoted today as a thorough study of this complex clinical syndrome; and the Pittsburgh Transplantation Institute at the University of Pittsburgh, directed by Dr. Thomas E. Starzl, the pioneer who in 1963 performed the first liver transplantation on a human being. In Pittsburgh, Dr. Marino completed an American Society of Transplant Surgeons-approved multi-organ transplant fellowship under the direct leadership of Dr. Starzl and was hired by him as an attending physician and a Faculty member in 1991. Pittsburgh was then by far the most active Liver transplantation centre in the world: for example, in 1990–1991 alone, more than 1,000 liver transplantation were performed at the Pittsburgh Transplantation Institute.

In 1992, Marino was appointed associate director of the National Liver Transplant Center of the United States Department of Veterans Affairs of Pittsburgh, then the only Liver transplantation department of the Government of the United States. Marino was a member of the surgical team that, in June 1992 and January 1993, performed two baboon-to-human liver xenotransplants in a clinical trial coordinated by Starzl.

In 1997, Marino founded the ISMETT (Mediterranean Institute for Transplantation and Advanced Specialized Therapies) organ transplant centre in Palermo, Sicily. Marino was the CEO and the Director of ISMETT from 1997 until 2002, the first liver transplantion center in Sicily, founded through a partnership between the University of Pittsburgh Medical Center and the Ministry of Health of the Government of Italy Ministry of Health (Italy)of the Category:Government of Italy.

In 2001, Marino performed the first organ transplant in Italy on a person with HIV undergoing highly active antiretroviral therapy—a kidney transplant made in response to a personal request from the patient himself (along with the donor, his father), who had been turned down by other Italian transplant centres. A clinical success, the operation sparked an institutional dispute in Italy at the time. (Note: The Minister of Health, Girolamo Sirchia, publicly criticized Marino for undertaking the operation, and the National Transplant Centre (CNT) advised him not to perform any further transplants on people with HIV. This stance conflicted with the opinion of the president of the bioethics panel of the National Research Council who openly supported Marino's decision, as well as with views expressed by (among others) the president of the National Bioethics Committee, Giovanni Berlinguer, who argued that people with HIV should not be excluded a priori from the benefits of transplantation. Nowadays, similar transplants are routinely conducted both in Italy and elsewhere.)

In 2002, Marino moved to Philadelphia at the Thomas Jefferson University.

Marino is the recipients of several international medical awards, including the 2010 Award for contributions to the fight against AIDS; Honorary Doctor of Science degree (2015) at the Thomas Jefferson University; the Longmire Professorship of the David Geffen School of Medicine at UCLA and the Longmire Surgical Society Society.

Marino has personally performed over 650 transplants. Marino delivered more than 700 international scientific lectures and is the author of over 500 peer-review articles and has authored several scientific books. In 2005, he published a book with Einaudi ("Le Vele" series) entitled Credere e curare ("Treating and Believing"); the book deals with the medical profession and the influence that faith, seen as a religious creed but also as compassion, solidarity, and empathy towards all human beings, has upon it. In 2005, he founded Imagine ONLUS, an international non-profit organization engaged in international solidarity activities with special regard to health issues. He is also a member of the editorial board of Transplantation, Liver Transplantation, Clinical Transplantation, and 9 other international scientific journals.

Marino is Professor of Surgery at the Thomas Jefferson University, School of Medicine, and, from 2020, Executive Vice President of Thomas Jefferson University and Jefferson Health in Philadelphia.

In 2020, Marino was appointed Member of the Board of Directors of the Philadelphia International Medicine.

== Political career ==
=== Entry into politics ===
A good friend of Massimo D'Alema, Marino was persuaded by him to enter into politics as an independent candidate with the Democrats of the Left in the 2006 general elections, and was elected as a Senator. On June 6, 2006, Marino was elected Chair of the Health Committee of the Senate of the Republic (Italy). Among the main achievements of Senator Marino as Chair of the Health Committee: - a national law was proposed and approved to manage and reduce patients' waiting list time and to establish new rules for public/private physicians' practice in Italian National Health Care System hospitals; - a law proposal on living will that started a national debate; - an international meeting on living will from the clinical, bioethical and religious perspectives, attended by the President of Italy; - a national law was proposed and approved that allocates 180 million euros per year for a total of 10 years to patients who have been infected (hepatitis, HIV) during hospital care; - a national law was proposed and approved to allocate dedicated funds in the national budget law for researchers under 40 in the biomedical field according to peer review criteria by an international committee - a dramatic innovation in the Italian research funds allocation system. Given his professional background, in his new capacity, he promoted several legislative activities mainly dealing with healthcare, education, scientific research, and bioethics.

Following the fall of Romano Prodi's government and an early election held in 2008, he was confirmed in the Senate, where he was appointed whip of the Democratic Party in the Standing Committee on Health and Chair of the Investigative Committee on National Health System. In his second tenure as a Senator, Marino gained public exposure due to his strong support for the right to die and a clear advance health care directive law during the dramatic final days of Eluana Englaro, which caused widespread debate and a constitutional crisis within Italy. Following such events, Marino has become recognizable in Italian politics as a strong advocate of a lay country, gaining vocal support from left-wing parties and the Italian Radicals, but also being criticized by socially conservative politicians also within the Democratic Party, such as Paola Binetti. During his mandate, he has promoted: - a national study on quality assurance and outcomes of all major healthcare districts in Italy; - an investigation into the much-debated and controversial death of an inmate; - a national investigation on mental illnesses and psychiatric care; - a national investigation on severe disabilities and their treatments; - a national investigation on corruption in the National Health Care System; - a national investigation on hospitals built-in or near earthquake areas.

In June 2009, he publicly announced his intention to run as a candidate for the Democratic Party leadership election in October. His leadership election platform was mostly focused on social rights, public health and environmentalism. He came third in the election, winning 12.5% of the votes.

=== Mayor of Rome ===
Marino ran the 2013 election for Mayor of Rome with the support of a centre-left alliance. After leading in the first round he was elected (on 10 June) Mayor of Rome at the second ballot, winning 63.9% of the votes in a run-off against the centre-right candidate, the incumbent mayor Gianni Alemanno.

Among Marino's projects has been the closing of the Via dei Fori Imperiali and Piazza di Spagna to cars and opening to pedestrian and bicycle traffic only. Mayor Marino cited his experiences as a cyclist in Philadelphia as the foundation for his having learned to live without a car.

On 18 October 2014, Marino registered the marriages of 16 same-sex couples who requested it to the Municipality, which followed similar acts by other Italian mayors. Same-sex marriages and civil unions were illegal in Italy at the time, and by registering the marriages, Mayor Marino hoped to force the hand of national legislators to clarify a deepening legal muddle around same-sex unions, particularly for Italians married abroad. Same-sex civil unions were eventually legalized in Italy in 2016.

Upon his election, Marino found Rome on the verge of bankruptcy. In 2013, the city was in the red with a loss of $888 million. Its public transport system had a loss of $951 million. During his mandate, Marino balanced both budgets.

In only 27 months, the administrative work conducted by Mayor Ignazio Marino, strengthening the city's operating performance, was recognized by all International Rating Agencies. In September 2015, Fitch Ratings revised the Italian City of Rome's Outlook to Stable from Negative for the first time.

In April 2015, Mayor Ignazio Marino successfully proposed the candidature of Rome as host city for the 2023 edition of the Ryder Cup, the first ever in Italy, held at the Marco Simone Golf & Country Club from 25 September to 1 October 2023.

On 12 October 2015, Marino resigned amidst a fake accusation of expense scandal that had been made by the opposition parties of Five Star Movement (M5S) and Fratelli d'Italia, but on 29 October, he withdrew the resignation. Nevertheless, on 30 October, he was ousted from his position after 26 of the 48 members of the City Council resigned. He was replaced by Francesco Paolo Tronca, a government-appointed commissioner.

On 7 October 2016, Rome court acquitted Marino over the allegations of embezzlement, fraud, and forgery that had been made by the opposition parties of M5S and Fratelli d'Italia and after which he had stepped down to prove his innocence. The court case concerning the alleged unjustified expenses has definitively ended with an acquittal ‘because the fact does not exist’: the Italian Supreme Court on 09-04-2019 ruled that the expenses made with the credit card granted to former Mayor Marino by the Capitoline Administration constituted entertainment expenses made in the interest of Rome and for institutional purposes. The Court also emphasised the radical unfoundedness of the accusatory hypothesis from the outset, which should not have justified even the start of investigations against Marino

==== Conservation of cultural heritage ====
Since 2013, Ignazio Marino has fostered the interest of several philanthropists in carrying out numerous archaeological restoration operations on Rome's artistic heritage on sites considered UNESCO World Heritage Sites. These include the restoration of the Spanish Steps, the Trevi Fountain, the Cestia Pyramid, the fresco in the Orazi and Curiazi Hall of the Capitoline Museums, the Fountain of the Dioscuri, and the Fountain of the Barcaccia in the Spanish Steps.

During the Marino administration, work began that led to the reopening to the public of the Mausoleum of Augustus and excavations in Via Alessandrina in the archaeological area of the Imperial Fora from which the marble head of a statue of the god Dionysus re-emerged in 2019 and a second head from the imperial age depicting probably the emperor Augustus in his youth in 2022.

Also of particular note are the two anastylosis operations of seven columns from the Temple of Peace and two orders of columns from the Basilica Ulpia.

=== Return to medicine and surgery ===
In 2016, Marino returned to the USA, where he is Professor of Surgery at Thomas Jefferson University, School of Medicine, and Executive Vice President of Thomas Jefferson University and Jefferson Health in Philadelphia.

Jefferson Health, the clinical arm of Thomas Jefferson University, is an 18-hospital health system with more than 42,000 employees and an annual operating revenue of $9 billion.

Among its prestigious international partners, Jefferson counts Università Cattolica del Sacro Cuore and Fondazione Policlinico Universitario A. Gemelli. A number of joint projects are ongoing, among which Erasmus ICM projects in medicine, the building of a neuroscience institute in Rome, and a one-of-a-kind Triple Degree program offering students enrolled on the Cattolica Degree Programme in Medicine and Surgery the opportunity to earn a Double Degree qualification in Medicine with Thomas Jefferson University Sidney Kimmel Medical College and an additional master's degree in International Health Care Policy (this double degree in Medicine and Surgery is unprecedented and allows the physicians to practice in the 27 Countries of the European Union and the 50 USA States).

Among Marino's recent scientific interest, his collaboration with the 2012 Nobel Laureate in Economics, Alvin Roth and surgeon Michael Rees to implement the so-called Global Kidney Exchange (GKE) program. GKE aims at matching donors and recipients, making kidney transplantation possible for patients who face a variety of immunological, regulatory, and financial barriers.

=== Member of the European Parliament, 2024–present ===
Since the 2024 European Parliament election, Marino has been serving as deputy chair of the Greens–European Free Alliance (Greens/EFA) group, under the leadership of co-chairs Terry Reintke and Bas Eickhout.

He is a member of the Committee on Budgets, of the Committee on the Environment, Public Health and Food Safety, of the Delegation for relations with the United States, of the Delegation to the OACPS-EU Joint Parliamentary Assembly, member of the Committee in Public Health, and Substitute for the Delegation to the Africa-EU Parliamentary Assembly.

Many times, Marino was invited by and gave some lectures at the Grand Orient of Italy.

== Notes and references ==
Notes
