= Mimmo Lucà =

Italian politician (1953–2025)

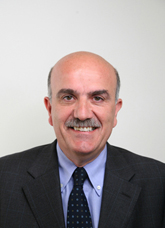
- Lucà in 2008

Member of the Chamber of Deputies of Italy for Piedmont 1
- In office 15 April 1994 – 14 March 2013

Personal details
- Born: Domenico Lucà; 16 June 1953 Gioiosa Ionica, Italy
- Died: 13 February 2025 (aged 71) Rivalta di Torino, Italy
- Party: CS (1993–1998); DS (1998–2007); PD (2007–2025)
- Education: University of Turin
- Occupation: Civil servant

Domenico "Mimmo" Lucà (16 June 1953 – 13 February 2025) was an Italian politician. A member of the Social Christians, the Democrats of the Left, and the Democratic Party, he served in the Chamber of Deputies from 1994 to 2013.

Lucà died in Rivalta di Torino on 13 February 2025, at the age of 71.
