= Lapo Pistelli =

Italian politician (born 1964)

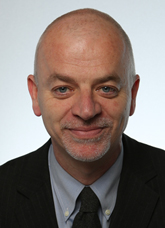

Deputy Minister of Foreign Affairs
- In office 3 May 2013 – 15 June 2015
- Prime Minister: Matteo Renzi; Enrico Letta
- Minister: Federica Mogherini; Emma Bonino

Member of the Chamber of Deputies
- In office 15 March 2013 – 1 July 2015
- Constituency: Emilia Romagna
- In office 29 April 2008 – 14 March 2013
- Constituency: Marche
- In office 9 May 1996 – 19 July 2004
- Constituency: Tuscany

Personal details
- Born: 20 June 1964 (age 62) Florence, Italy
- Party: Democratic Party (2007–present); The Daisy (2002–2007); People's Party (1994–2002); Christian Democracy (Before 1994)
- Other political affiliations: The Olive Tree (1995–2007)
- Education: University of Florence

Lapo Pistelli (born 20 June 1964, in Florence) is an Italian politician and Member of the Chamber of Deputies of the Italian Parliament, elected for the Italian Democratic Party. In the Italian Democratic Party, he is the Head of the Foreign Affairs and International Relations Department.

He is the son of Nicola Pistelli (1929–64), a Christian Democrat politician.

== Biography ==
Graduated in Political Science and International Relations at the University of Florence (1988), Pistelli started his political career in the Christian Democracy (Democrazia Cristiana) as Responsible for the foreign affairs office of the Christian Democrat Youth Movement (1987–1991) becoming, in the following years, Member of the secretariat and directorate (1995–1999) and coordinator of the national secretariat (1999–2001) of the Italian People's Party (Partito Popolare), and member of the executive and official responsible for foreign affairs (2001–2004) of the Democracy is Freedom – The Daisy (La Margherita) party.

In 1996, after serving as municipal councillor of Florence (1990–1995), he is elected as a Member of the Chamber of Deputies of Italy with The Olive Tree political coalition (l'Ulivo) (1996–2001), and is confirmed Deputy also in the subsequent legislature (2001–2004), operating as a member of the Committee on Foreign Affairs and member of the OSCE Parliamentary Assembly (2001–2004).

In 2004 he was elected as a member of the European Parliament (2004–2008), where he served as Head of the Italian Delegation, as the vice-chairman of the Alliance of Liberals and Democrats for Europe and as a member of two Committees (Foreign Affairs and Financial and Economic Affairs).

In 2007, with the foundation of the Italian Democratic Party (Partito Democratico), he became a member of the national executive of the Party with the role of responsible for Foreign Affairs, and in 2008 he was elected to the Italian Parliament. At present, he is a member of the III Committee (Foreign Affairs) of the Chamber of Deputies.

== Activities ==
As a member of the Florence Faculty of the Bing Overseas Studies of Stanford University, he lectured in various universities around the globe. In Italy, he is a member of the Board of the IAI (International Affairs Institute) and of the Institute for Relations of Italy with Africa, Latin America, and the Middle and Far East. He is also a member of the Council Italy-United States and of the Board of Editors of East (European and Asian Strategies) and continues to cooperate with several progressive think tanks such as Policy Network in London, The Center for American Progress and Brookings Institution in Washington, the Foundation IDEAS in Madrid, the European Council on Foreign Relations. He has been Vice President of the Italy-USA Foundation from 2008 to 2010. A journalist since 1991, he publishes regularly in various newspapers on issues related to European and international affairs and on specialized magazines like Aspenia and Limes. His publications include Semestre nero: Berlusconi e la politica estera ("Black semester: Berlusconi and Italian Foreign Policy"), 2004; and America Take Away, 2006.

== Books ==
- Lapo Pistelli; Franco Monaco, Luigi Pizzolato. Giorgio La Pira: speranza e profezia cristiana nel 20º anniversario della morte ("Giorgio La Pira: hope and christian prophecy in the 20th anniversary of his death"), In Dialogo, 1998. ISBN 88-8123-111-5
- Lapo Pistelli; Matteo Renzi. Ma le giubbe rosse non-uccisero Aldo Moro ("But the Red Shirts did not kill Aldo Moro"), Donzelli, 1999. ISBN 88-09-01483-9
- Lapo Pistelli; Enrico Letta. Il boomerang. Lo stato sociale visto dai giovani ("The boomerang. The welfare seen by the youth"), Donzelli, 2001. ISBN 978-88-7989-536-1
- Lapo Pistelli; Guelfo Fiore. Semestre nero. Berlusconi e la politica estera ("Black semester. Berlusconi and Italian Foreign Policy"), Fazi Editore, 2004. ISBN 88-8112-506-4
- Lapo Pistelli, America take away, Fazi Editore, 2006. ISBN 88-8112-735-0
