= Ermanno Gorrieri =

Italian politician and economist

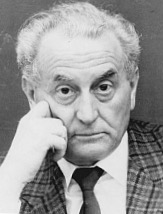
Ermanno Gorrieri

Ermanno Gorrieri (26 November 1920 – 29 December 2004) was an Italian politician and economist.

== Biography ==
Gorrieri was born in Magreta in Formigine in 1920. In 1928 he moved to Modena, where he graduated in law, and became an officer of the Alpine troops. During World War II he participated in the resistance and was active in the creation of the short-lived Republic of Montefiorino. After the war he was a trade union activist and one of the founders of the CISL. Between 1958 and 1963 he was a member of the Chamber of Deputies, and was Minister of Labor in 1987. One of his main interests was the problem of poverty. He authored five books and collaborated on fourteen more. Originally a member of the Christian Democratic party, he was one of the founders (with Pierre Carniti) of the Social Christians in 1993.

== See also ==
- Christian Left
