= ISMETT =

- Region of Sicily and the University of Pittsburgh Medical Center

- Location of ISMETT in the Mediterranean

Geography
- Location: Via Ernesto Tricomi, 1, Palermo, Italy
- Coordinates: 38.1016374°N 13.357948°E

Organisation
- Type: Specialist

Services
- Beds: 70
- Speciality: Organ transplantation

History
- Founded: March 28, 1997

Links
- Website: http://www.ismett.edu/

ISMETT, in Italian, Istituto Mediterraneo per i Trapianti e Terapie ad Alta Specializzazione translated as the Mediterranean Institute for Transplantation and Advanced Specialized Therapies, is a center for organ transplantation located in Palermo, Italy. ISMETT was founded in 1997 as a partnership between the Region of Sicily, the Civico and Cervello hospitals in Palermo, and the University of Pittsburgh Medical Center (UPMC).

ISMETT primarily specializes in performing all types of organ transplantations, using both deceased and living donor techniques. ISMETT has 70 beds (14 ICU, 21 in semi-intensive, and 35 inpatient), 7 outpatient beds, 4 operating rooms, a hospital pharmacy and laboratory analysis, infectious diseases and pathology in a facility that covers an area of 130,000-square-foot (12,000 m^{2}).

== History ==
The idea of creation of the Institute stemmed from a group of hepatologists at a hospital in Palermo that proposed to the University of Pittsburgh Medical Center (UPMC) the idea of a multi-organ transplant center to be realized in Sicily. Its creation was also prompted by a 1995 law passed in the United States that capped the total number of foreign patients that can be placed on a waiting list for transplants at 5%. For this reason, transplant leaders in Pittsburgh began looking toward opportunities in Europe and participated actively in the creation of a transplant center in Palermo. On May 23, 1996, the idea was presented to the Ministry of Health, who welcomed the project.

The first director was Ignazio R. Marino who performed the first successful liver transplantation in Sicily on July 31, 1999. Ignazio Marino's team performed the first 100 solid organ transplantations of ISMETT.

On March 20, 1997, the State-Region Conference officially approved the creation and clinical management of ISMETT in accordance with art. 9/bis of Legislative Decree no. 502/92 and proceeded with construction of the new institute. The construction began in 1999 with the laying of a foundation stone and was completed in 2004 when the new center opened its doors.

As of 2007, ISMETT had revenues of €2,270,000. Its chairman was Camillo Ricordi, with Bruno Gridelli serving as its director-general and Ugo Palazzo serving as its director of health

== Transplant activities ==
ISMETT began its clinical activity in 1999. On July 31, 1999, Ignazio Marino performed its first liver transplant from a cadaveric donor in Sicily. The same year Ignazio Marino started a cadaveric and living donor kidney transplantation program. The team led by Ignazio Marino performed the first 100 solid organ transplant at ISMETT. In 2004, ISMETT obtained permission to perform heart-lung transplants, thus becoming a multi-organ transplant center.

In 2003 ISMETT started a pediatric liver transplantation program, and that year performed the first children's transplant done in southern Italy.

== Transplantation of HIV+ patients ==
In 2001, Ignazio Marino performed the first living donor transplant into and HIV-positive patient in Italy, a procedure that created controversy and criticism, including complaint from the Ministry of Health. The Ministry moved to censure Marino arguing that this particular type of transplant had the characteristics of clinical trials that required special authorization. That patient transplanted by Dr. Marino is still alive and enjoying an excellent quality of life free of dialysis, 16 years after the kidney transplant. Because of this success the rules in Italy have been changed and now HIV-positive patients are not any longer denied access to transplantation if they need it.

In 2007, for the first time in the world, an ISMETT team led by Dr. Bruno Gridelli performed a lung transplant on an HIV positive patient In this case, the intervention was authorized by the Ministry and was included within an experimental program launched by the National Transplant Center. This time, no controversy was recorded and the procedure received congratulatory press.

== The Cell Factory ==
In 2007, the Regenerative Medicine and Cell Therapy Unit (Unità di Medicina Rigenerativa e Terapie Cellulari), termed the Cell Factory, was opened at ISMETT with the aim to initiate a program of regenerative medicine that researches the reparation of damaged organs. The mobile production laboratories (GMP Facility) of the unit have been made part of a project sponsored by the Region of Sicily and the Budget and Finance under the "ICT for the excellence of the territories."

Among the research trials carried out at the Cell Factory is the injection of fetal hepatocytes as a therapy to bridge the patients waiting for a liver transplant, transplantation of pancreatic islets for patients with diabetes type 1, and transplantation of human fetal skin cells for the treatment of lesions of the skin.

== The Center for Simulation ==
The Center for Simulation became active at ISMETT in June, 2007 with the aim to prevent and reduce medical errors. The use of simulation for training staff is already quite widespread in certain sectors such as aviation, and has now spread into the medical field. The simulation center provides for the implementation of higher risk procedures without risk to personnel and without involving patients.

The center has five life-sized and technologically sophisticated simulator mannequins that can mimic the signs and symptoms of real patients. The center was created thanks to a donation from the Foundation Fiandaca. The training activities of the centre, which is open to all health care providers, began in January, 2008 .

== Directors ==
- Ignazio Marino (1999-2002)
- John Fung (2002-2008)
- Bruno Gridelli (2008 - 2016)
- Angelo Luca (dal 2016)

== See also ==
- University of Pittsburgh Medical Center
- Organ transplantation
