= Pierre Carniti =

Italian politician

Secretary-General of the CISL
- In office 2 May 1979 – 6 February 1985
- Preceded by: Luigi Macario
- Succeeded by: Franco Marini

Member of the Italian Senate
- In office 9 November 1993 – 14 April 1994

Personal details
- Born: 25 September 1936 Castelleone, Italy
- Died: 5 June 2018 (aged 81) Rome, Italy
- Party: PSI (until 1993); CS/PDS (1993–1998); DS (1998–2007)
- Profession: Syndicalist, Politician

Pierre Carniti (25 September 1936 – 5 June 2018) was an Italian politician and trade unionist.

Carniti was born in Castelleone, in the province of Cremona, Lombardy. He was general secretary of CISL, the major Catholic trade union federation, between 1979 and 1985. Unlike most other CISL leaders, who were aligned with Christian Democracy, Carniti was a member of the Italian Socialist Party (PSI).

Carniti was president of the Parliamentary Commission on Poverty from 1994 to 1997. He was a Member of the European Parliament from 1989 to 1999, associated with the Party of European Socialists. In 1993, with Ermanno Gorrieri, he left the PSI to co-found the socialist party Social Christians (CS). He was also a member of Committee on Employment and Social Affairs from 1997 to 1999.

== See also ==
- Christian Left
