= Marcello Pera =

Italian philosopher and politician (born 1943)

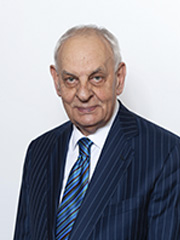
- Marcello Pera in 2022

President of the Senate of the Republic
- In office 30 May 2001 – 27 April 2006
- Preceded by: Nicola Mancino
- Succeeded by: Franco Marini

Member of the Senate of the Republic
- Incumbent
- Assumed office 13 October 2022
- Constituency: Sassari
- In office 9 May 1996 – 14 March 2013
- Constituency: Lucca (1996–2006); Emilia-Romagna (2006–2008); Lazio (2008–2013)

Personal details
- Born: 28 January 1943 (age 83) Lucca, Kingdom of Italy
- Party: FdI (since 2022)
- Other political affiliations: PSI (until 1994); FI (1994–2009); PdL (2009–2013)
- Education: University of Pisa
- Profession: Philosopher; Politician

Marcello Pera (Italian pronunciation: [marˈtʃɛllo ˈpɛːra, -e-]; born 28 January 1943) is an Italian philosopher and politician. He was the president of the Italian Senate from 2001 to 2006.

== Career ==
Pera was born in Lucca,⁣ and graduated in accounting. He worked for the Banca Toscana and for the Camera di Commercio in Lucca. He went on to study philosophy at the University of Pisa, concentrating on the works of Karl Popper and his open society theory, and advocating these principles during the difficult 1970s, the anni di piombo.

His academic career began in 1976 at the University of Pisa. He then went on to pursue research activities internationally: Fulbright scholar, University of Pittsburgh, 1984; Linguistics and Philosophy, MIT, Cambridge, Massachusetts, 1990; visiting fellow, Centre for the Philosophy of Natural Sciences, London School of Economics, 1995–96. He taught theoretical philosophy from 1989 to 1992 at the University of Catania. In 1992, he became a full professor of philosophy at the University of Pisa.

Pera has written for the newspapers Corriere della Sera, Il Messaggero, and La Stampa, as well as for the news magazines L'Espresso and Panorama. Pera has become a leading opponent of post-modernism and cultural relativism and on this subject, he resonates with religious thinkers. Opposing cultural relativism, he declared, "There are good reasons for deeming that some institutions are better than others. And I deny that such a judgment must necessarily lead to a clash."

Opposing the postmodern denial of the possibility of ascertaining objective facts, he says, "Against deconstructionism, I do not deny that facts do not exist without interpretation. I refute Nietzsche's thesis that "there are no facts, only interpretations" (F. Nietzsche, Afterthoughts); or Derrida's "there is nothing beyond the text" (J. Derrida, Of Grammatology)."

=== In the Senate ===
He was elected as a Senator for Forza Italia in 1996 and 2001. During the XIV Legislature, he was President of the Senate from 30 May 2001 to 27 April 2006. He was re-elected to the Senate in 2006 and 2008.

=== Dialogue with Pope Benedict XVI ===
An atheist, Pera co-authored a book with then Cardinal Joseph Ratzinger titled Senza radici ("Without Roots") and is the author of the introduction to the book originally titled L'Europa di Benedetto nella crisi delle culture, or in short, The Europe of Benedict, written by Ratzinger shortly before he became the pope. It has been reprinted as Christianity and the Crisis of Cultures.

Pera's 2008 book Perché dobbiamo dirci cristiani ("Why We Must Call Ourselves Christians") has a letter-preface by Pope Benedict XVI. Pera is a critic of the policies of Pope Francis and what he perceive as the Pope's attempts to influence Italian politics, in particular his response to the European migrant crisis; he accused the Pope of demanding that European states "commit suicide".

== Honour ==
=== Foreign honour ===
- Malaysia : Honorary Grand Commander of the Order of the Defender of the Realm (2003)
- Uruguay : Grand Cordon of the Medal of the Oriental Republic of Uruguay (2003)

== Publications ==
- Induzione e metodo scientifico, Pera M., Editrice Tecnico Scientifica, Pisa, 1978
- Popper e la scienza su palafitte, Pera M., Laterza, Roma-Bari, 1981
- Hume, Kant e l'induzione, Pera M., Il Mulino, Bologna, 1982
- Apologia del Metodo, Pera M., Laterza, Roma-Bari, 1982
- La Rana ambigua. La controversia sull'eletricità tra Galvana e Volta, Pera M., Einaudi, Torino, 1986; English translation The Ambiguous Frog: The Galvani-Volta Controversy on Animal Electricity, Princeton University Press, Princeton 1991
- Scienza e retorica, Pera M., Laterza, Roma-Bari, 1992; translated into English and revised as The Discourses of Science, (Chicago University Press, Chicago 1994
- Senza radici/Without Roots, Pera M., Ratzinger J., Mondadori, Milano 2004, Basic Books, New York 2006; German edition: Sankt Ulrich Verlag, Augsburg 2005; Spanish edition: Peninsula, Barcelona 2006
  - Ratzinger, Joseph; Pera, Marcello (2006). Without Roots: The West, Relativism, Christianity, Islam. New York: Basic Books. ISBN 978-0465006342.
- Perché dobbiamo dirci cristiani ("Why We Must Call Ourselves Christians"), Mondadori, Milano 2008; with a letter-preface by Pope Benedict XVI

Political offices
Preceded by Nicola Mancino	President of the Italian Senate; 2001–2006	Succeeded by Franco Marini
