= Pierluigi Castagnetti =

Italian politician (born 1945)

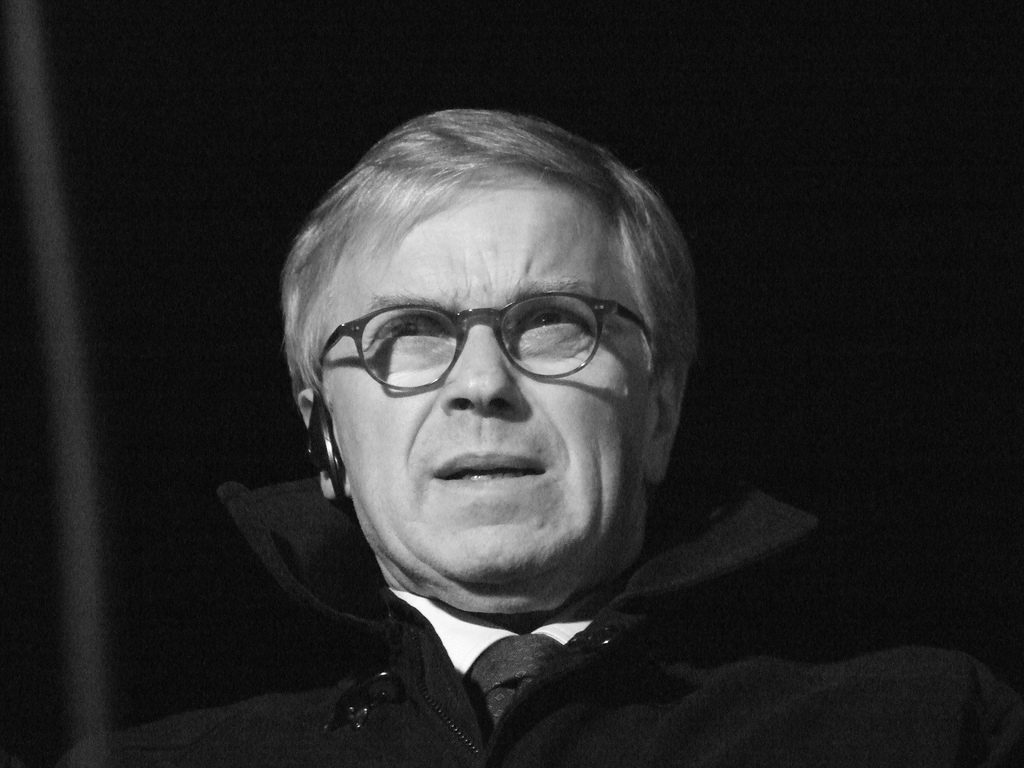

Secretary of the Italian People's Party
- In office 2 October 1999 – 24 March 2002
- Preceded by: Franco Marini
- Succeeded by: Dissolved party

Member of the Chamber of Deputies
- In office 2 July 1987 – 14 April 1994
- Constituency: Emilia-Romagna
- In office 30 May 2001 – 14 March 2013
- Constituency: Emilia-Romagna

Member of the European Parliament
- In office 19 July 1994 – 19 July 1999
- Constituency: North-East

Personal details
- Born: 9 June 1945 (age 81) Reggio nell'Emilia, Italy
- Party: PD (since 2007)
- Other political affiliations: DC (until 1994); PPI (1994–2002); DL (2002–2007)
- Education: University of Bologna
- Profession: Politician

Pierluigi Castagnetti (born 9 June 1945) is an Italian politician.

== Biography ==
Born in Reggio nell'Emilia, he graduated in Political science. In the 1970s he was collaborator of Giuseppe Dossetti, then of Benigno Zaccagnini and Mino Martinazzoli. In 1980 he was elected region councillor in Emilia-Romagna and two years later he became regional secretary of Christian Democracy.

Elected to the Chamber of Deputies for the first time in the 1987 Italian general election, Castagnetti was re-elected also in the general election of 1992, while in the 1994 European Parliament election he was elected MEP. In 1991, he was among the members of DC who voted against Italy's participation in the Gulf War.

In the Italian People's Party's congress of 1997, Castagnetti was beaten by Franco Marini for the appointment as secretary of the party, but in 1999 he managed to become the party's leader by beating Dario Franceschini and Ortensio Zecchino. Re-elected deputy in the 2001 Italian general election, in 2002 he disbanded the PPI to join Democracy is Freedom – The Daisy, a new party led by Francesco Rutelli.

In 2002 he was returned to judgment to trial with the charge of corruption, but on 15 April 2003, the Preliminary Judge granted him the attenuating and declared the offense prescribed.

Elected deputy also in the 2006 and 2008 general election, in 2011 Castagnetti announced his intention not to stand for re-election to encourage political renewal. From 2006 to 2008 he was Vice-President of the Chamber of Deputies, while from 2008 to 2013 he was President of the Council for the Permissions to proceed of the Chamber.

He is member of the head of House of European History.
