= Christian left =

Left-wing Christian political ideologies

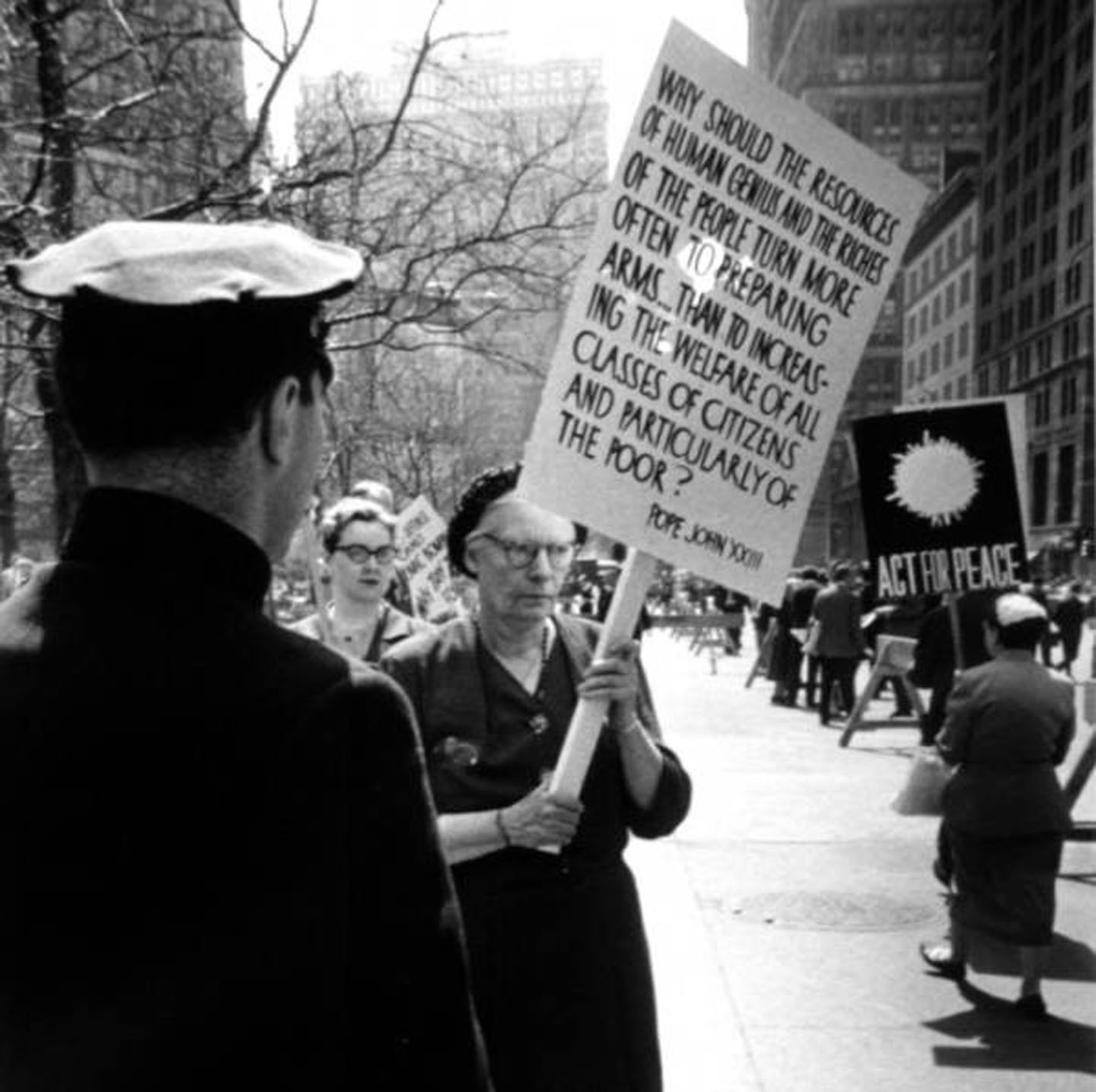
Dorothy Day, the co-founder of the Catholic Worker Movement, protesting at City Hall

The Christian left is a range of Christian political and social movements that largely embrace social justice principles and uphold a social doctrine or social gospel based on their interpretation of the teachings of Christianity. Given the inherent diversity in international political thought, the term Christian left can have different meanings and applications in different countries. While there is much overlap, the Christian left is distinct from liberal Christianity, meaning not all Christian leftists are liberal Christians and vice versa.

In the United States, the Christian left usually aligns with modern liberalism and progressivism, using the social gospel to achieve better social and economic equality. Christian anarchism, Christian communism, and Christian socialism are subsets of the socialist Christian left. Karl Marx and Friedrich Engels, authors of the Communist Manifesto, both had Christian upbringings; however, neither were devout Christians.

== Terminology ==
As with any section within the left–right political spectrum, a label such as Christian left represents an approximation, including within it groups and persons holding many diverse viewpoints. The term left-wing might encompass a number of values, some of which may or may not be held by different Christian movements and individuals. As the unofficial title of a loose association of believers, it provides a clear distinction from the more commonly known Christian right, or religious right, and from its key leaders and political views. The Christian left does not hold the notion that left-leaning policies, whether economic or social, stand in apparent contrast to Christian beliefs.

The most common religious viewpoint that might be described as left-wing is social justice, or care for impoverished and oppressed minority groups. Supporters of this trend might encourage universal health care, welfare provisions, subsidized education, foreign aid, and affirmative action for improving the conditions of the disadvantaged. With values stemming from egalitarianism, adherents of the Christian left consider it part of their religious duty to take actions on behalf of the oppressed. Matthew 25:31–46, among other verses, is often cited to support this view. As nearly all major religions contain the concept of a Golden Rule as a requirement to help others, adherents of various religions have cited social justice as a movement in line with their faith. The term social justice was coined in the 1840s by Luigi Taparelli, an Italian Catholic scholar of the Society of Jesus, who was inspired by the writings of Thomas Aquinas. The Christian left holds that social justice, renunciation of power, humility, forgiveness, and private observation of prayer (as in Matthew 6:5–6) as opposed to publicly mandated prayer, are mandated by the Gospel. The Bible contains accounts of Jesus repeatedly advocating for the poor and outcast over the wealthy, powerful, and religious. The Christian left maintains that such a stance is relevant and important. Adhering to the standard of "turning the other cheek", which they believe supersedes the Old Testament law of "an eye for an eye", the Christian left sometimes hearkens towards pacifism in opposition to policies advancing militarism.

The medieval Waldensians sect had a leftist character. Some among the Christian left, as well as some non-religious socialists, find support for anarchism, communism, and socialism in the Gospels, for example Mikhail Gorbachev citing Jesus as "the first socialist". The Christian left is a broad category that includes Christian socialism, as well as Christians who would not identify themselves as socialists.

== History ==
=== Christians and workers ===
To a significant degree, the Christian left developed out of the experiences of clergy who went to do pastoral work among the working class, often beginning without any social philosophy but simply a pastoral and evangelistic concern for workers. This was particularly true among the Methodists and Anglo-Catholics in England, Father Adolph Kolping in Germany and Joseph Cardijn in Belgium.

=== Christian left and campaigns for peace and human rights ===
Some Christian groups were closely associated with the peace movements against the Vietnam War as well as the 2003 Invasion of Iraq. Religious leaders in many countries have also been on the forefront of criticizing any cuts to social welfare programs. In addition, many prominent civil rights activists were religious figures.

=== In the United States ===
In the United States, members of the Christian Left come from a spectrum of denominations: Peace churches, elements of the Protestant mainline churches, Catholicism, and some evangelicals.

== Beliefs ==
=== Homosexuality ===
The Christian left generally approaches homosexuality differently from some other Christian political groups. This approach can be driven by focusing on issues differently despite holding similar religious views, or by holding different religious ideas. Those in the Christian left who have similar ideas as other Christian political groups but a different focus may view Christian teachings on certain issues, such as the Bible's prohibitions against killing or criticisms of concentrations of wealth, as far more politically important than Christian teachings on social issues emphasized by the religious right, such as opposition to homosexuality. Others in the Christian left have not only a different focus on issues from other Christian political groups, but different religious ideas as well.

For example, some members of the Christian left may consider discrimination and bigotry against homosexuals to be immoral, but they differ on their views towards homosexual sex. Some believe homosexual sex to be immoral but unimportant compared with issues relating to social justice, or even matters of sexual morality involving heterosexual sex. Others assert that some homosexual practices are compatible with the Christian life. Such members believe common biblical arguments used to condemn homosexuality are misinterpreted, and that biblical prohibitions of homosexual practices are actually against a specific type of homosexual sex act, i.e. pederasty, the sodomizing of young boys by older men. Thus, they hold biblical prohibitions to be irrelevant when considering modern same-sex relationships.

=== Consistent life ethic ===
A related strain of thought is the (Catholic and progressive evangelical) consistent life ethic, which sees opposition to capital punishment, militarism, euthanasia, abortion and the global unequal distribution of wealth as being related. It is an idea with certain concepts shared by Abrahamic religions as well as some Buddhists, Hindus, and members of other religions. The late Cardinal Joseph Bernardin of Chicago developed the idea for the consistent life ethic in 1983. Sojourners is particularly associated with this strand of thought.

=== Liberation theology ===
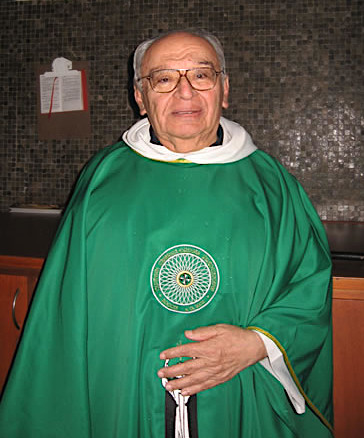
Gustavo Gutiérrez, one of the founders of Latin American liberation theology

Liberation theology is a theological tradition that emerged in the developing world, primarily in Latin America. Since the 1960s, Catholic thinkers have integrated left-wing thought and Catholicism, giving rise to Liberation theology.

It arose at a time when Catholic thinkers who opposed the despotic leaders in Southern and Central America allied themselves with the communist opposition. However, it developed independently of and roughly simultaneously with Black theology in the U.S. and should not be confused with it. The Congregation for the Doctrine of the Faith decided that while liberation theology is partially compatible with Catholic social teaching, certain Marxist elements of it, such as the doctrine of perpetual class struggle, are against Church teachings.

== Political parties ==
=== Active ===
State	Party	Notes
Chile	Citizen Left	
Greece	Christian Democracy	
Italy	360 Association, AreaDem, Olivists, Reformist Base, Social Christians, Teodem, The Populars, and Veltroniani	Factions within the Democratic Party
Italy	Democratic Centre	
Italy	Solidary Democracy	
Netherlands	Christian Union	Economically left-wing, progressive on matters like climate change and migration, but conservative on matters like abortion, drugs, euthanasia and prostitution
Nicaragua	Sandinista National Liberation Front	
Poland	AGROunia	Agrarian and nationalist Christian left
Poland	Self-Defence of the Republic of Poland	Agrarian and nationalist Christian left
Romania	Social Democratic Party	
Sweden	Religious Social Democrats of Sweden	Faction within the Swedish Social Democratic Party
Switzerland	Christian Social Party	
United Kingdom	Christians on the Left	Faction within the Labour Party
United States	American Solidarity Party	Economic left
United States	Prohibition Party	Economic left
Uruguay	Christian Democratic Party of Uruguay	

=== Defunct ===
State	Party	Notes
Belgium	Humanist Democratic Centre	Factions only
Canada	Co-operative Commonwealth Federation	Merged into the New Democratic Party
Chile	Citizen Left	
East Germany	Christian Democratic Union	Until 1989
Italy	Democracy is Freedom – The Daisy	Merged into the Democratic Party
Italy	Italian People's Party	Merged into Democracy is Freedom – The Daisy
Netherlands	Evangelical People's Party	Merged into GroenLinks
Netherlands	Political Party of Radicals	Merged into GroenLinks

== See also ==
=== Movements and denominations ===
A number of movements of the past had similarities to today's Christian left:

- Anabaptists
- Camilism
- Catholic Worker Movement
- Christian anarchism
- Christian communism
- Christian Church (Disciples of Christ)
- Congregationalists
- Diggers
- Emergent Church
- Episcopal Church (United States)
- Evangelical Lutheran Church in America
- Tolstoyan movement
- Fifth Monarchists
- German Peasants' War
- Heretical movements such as the Cathars
- Jesus movement
- Liberation theology
- Lollard
- Peace churches
- Progressive National Baptist Convention
- Quakers
- Role of Christians in the Peasants' Revolt in England, see Lollard priest John Ball
- Seventh-day Adventist Church
- Unitarianism
- United Church of Christ
- Universalism
- Waldenses

=== Other ===
- Christian democracy
- Christian libertarianism
- Christian pacifism
- Christian politics
- Christian socialism
- Evangelical left
- Homosexuality and Christianity
- International League of Religious Socialists
- Jewish left
- Left-wing populism
- Liberal Christianity
- Pacifism
- Political Catholicism
- Progressive Christianity
- Progressive Muslim vote
- Religion and abortion
- Religious communism
- Religious socialism
- Religious Society of Friends
- Social Gospel
- Spiritual left

== Bibliography ==
- Young, Shawn David (2015). Gray Sabbath: Jesus People USA, the Evangelical Left, and the Evolution of Christian Rock. New York: Columbia University Press.
