= Simply Democrats =

Faction of Italy's Democratic Party

Simply Democrats (Italian: Semplicemente Democratici) was a heterogeneous faction within the Democratic Party, a political party in Italy.

At the 2009 leadership election the group (whose main members included Sergio Cofferati, Rita Borsellino, David Sassoli, Debora Serracchiani and Francesca Barracciu) supported the candidacy of Dario Franceschini, who eventually lost to Pier Luigi Bersani.

Serracchiani and Giuseppe Civati later organized a new faction composed mainly of middle-aged and young Democrats.
