= International League of Religious Socialists =

Organization of religious socialist parties

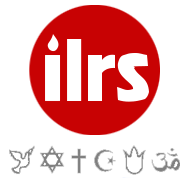
ILRS official logo

The International League of Religious Socialists (ILRS) is an umbrella organization of religious socialist movements in political parties throughout the world. Founded in the 1920s, it has member groups in 20 countries totaling 200,000 members. For most of its history, it was mainly European and contained mainly Christian socialist groups, but has recently expanded to the Americas, Africa, and Australia to include more groups with connections to other religions. It is an associate organisation of Socialist International.

== History ==
=== Background ===
The International League of Religious Socialists (ILRS) is the oldest continuing socialist organization in Europe. The first international conference of the ILRS was held in the Netherlands by Willem Banning and Carl Mennicke in 1926. Willem Banning served as a Dutch preacher and co-founded the Dutch Labor Party. Carl Mennicke was a German-born theologian. A second conference was held in 1928 in Switzerland, and the following year, in 1929, an international committee for religious socialists was founded in Cologne, Germany. Among its members were Switzerland, Germany, Austria, Belgium, England and France. This conference solidified the existence of an international organization and is considered to be the official origin of the ILRS. From this point until the 1970s, the activities and membership of the ILRS was limited to Northern Europe.

=== The Bommersvik Congress ===
In 1983, the International League of Religious Socialists held a conference in Bommersvik, Sweden. This conference established the global reach of the ILRS, highlighting the commitment of the organization to provide a platform for Christian socialists around the world. The U.S. Religion and Socialism Commission formally joined the ILRS at this meeting. Under this conference's theme of "Peace and Employment", the ILRS addressed the relationship between the global north and south amidst the Cold War.

3 years later, the ILRS expanded its borders even further and met outside of Europe for the first time. This meeting took place in Managua, Nicaragua in October 1986 and featured 67 participants from 16 different countries. At the Bommersvik Conference, the Minister of Education for Nicaragua, Carlos Tunnerman, invited the ILRS to hold their next conference in Nicaragua, under the theme of "No Peace without Justice and Democracy".

Expanding to the Middle East, the Palestinian Liberation Organization (PLO) attended the 1989 Stockholm Congress of the ILRS. In 2002, the International League of Religious Socialists sat down with both the PLO and the Meretz party, an Israeli religious socialist party, in West Bank and Israel, respectively.

=== The Cold War ===
With the fall of the Berlin Wall, the ILRS was able to integrate the former Soviet bloc countries into their fold. In 1991, the organization's conference was under the theme of "A New Europe: Challenges for Central/Eastern Europe". This conference was attended by delegates from Hungary, Czechoslovakia, Bulgaria, Slovenia, Lithuania and Estonia to name a few. At the ILRS conference in 2000, both Latvia and Italy officially joined the organization.

== Leadership of the ILRS ==
=== Previous leadership ===
20th century presidents of the ILRS include Adiranus von Bieman, and his successor, Evert Svennson who led the organization from 1983 to 2003. More recently, previous President Cynthia Dalman Eek met with European Union Parliament members in 2017, noting the aim of the ILRS to be focused around discussing religion, social inclusion and integration.

=== Current leadership ===
Today, the ILRS is led by President Jan Rudy Kristensen from Norway. Other executive board members include the Vice Presidents: Carlos García de Andoín, of Spain and Miryam Ghersi of Spain. The current treasurer is Jochen Geraedts of the Netherlands.

== Religious socialism in the ILRS ==
The socialist ideology of the ILRS asserts that participation in parliamentary politics is necessary, yet they support strong state intervention in areas of education, health and social welfare. Economically, they maintain that free-market capitalism needs to have moral limits.

Today, the efforts of the ILRS are focused on helping social democratic parties navigate between illiberal secularism and tolerant multiculturalism. The organization sees itself as a mediator between left-wing European political parties, religious communities, and state governments. Its most recent conference was held in Utretch in 2018, under the theme of "Europe as a community of values".

Recently, the ILRS has been expanding beyond its Protestant tradition. Islamic organizations, the Federation of Islamic Organizations in Europe (FIOE) and the Islamic Center of Milan, attended the 1997 ILRS conference in Helsinki.

== Member organizations ==
The International League of Religious Socialists (ILRS) grants membership to religious socialist groups on a national basis rather than to individual members directly.

The following table lists the member and affiliate organizations according to the ILRS roster:

Country	Organization Name	Primary Affiliation
Australia	Ernest Burgmann Society	Ernest Burgmann Society
Austria	ACUS: Arbeitsgemeinschaft Christentum und Sozialismus	SPÖ affiliation
Costa Rica	Cristianos por la Liberación	Costa Rican Left
Dominican Republic	Frente Nacional de Cultos	PRD affiliation
Finland	Kristillisten Sosiaalidemokraattinen Liitto	SDP affiliation
Germany	Bund der Religiösen Sozialistinnen und Sozialisten Deutschlands e.V. (BRSD)	BRSD
Hungary	Religious Socialist Section of the MSZP	MSZP
Italy	Cristiano Sociali	Cristiano Sociali
Latvia	Latvian Christian Social Democratic Organisation	Latvian Social Democracy
Lithuania	Religious Social Democrats	LSDP affiliation
Netherlands	Trefpunt van Socialisme en Levensovertuiging	PvdA affiliation
Norway	Kristne Arbeidere	Kristne Arbeidere
Philippines	Akbayan Citizens' Action Party	KiBam
South Africa	ANC Commission on Religious Affairs	ANC
Spain	Cristianos en el PSOE	PSOE
Sri Lanka	Satyodaya Centre for Social Research and Encounter	Sri Lankan Left
Sweden	Socialdemokrater för tro och solidaritet (formerly Broderskap Rörelsen)	Social Democrats for Faith and Solidarity
Switzerland	Religiös-Sozialistische Vereinigung der Deutschschweiz (RSV)	SPPS affiliation
United Kingdom	Christians on the Left (formerly Christian Socialist Movement)	Christians on the Left
United States	Religion and Socialism Commission	DSA

== See also ==
- Christian left
