= Enzo Carra =

Italian politician (1943–2023)

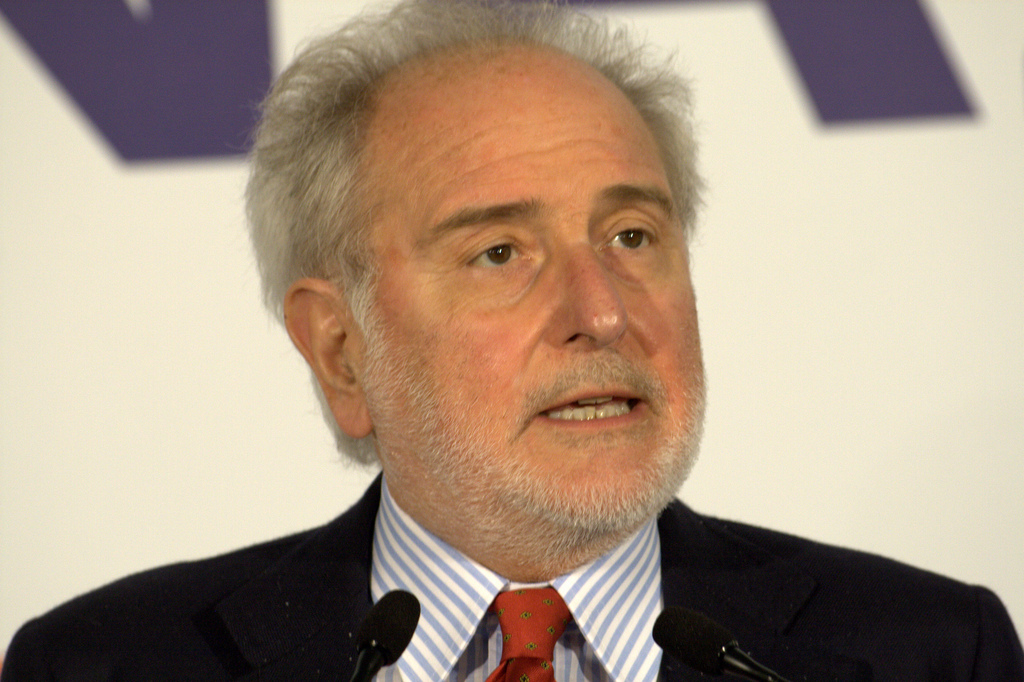
- Carra in 2010

Member of the Chamber of Deputies of Italy
- In office 30 May 2001 – 14 March 2013
- Constituency: Campania 1 (2001–2006); Lazio 1 (2006–2008); Sicily 1 (2008–2013)

Personal details
- Born: 8 August 1943 Rome, Italy
- Died: 2 February 2023 (aged 79) Rome, Italy
- Party: DC (until 1994); PPI (1994–2002); DL (2002–2007); PD (2007–2010); UdC (2010–2013)
- Occupation: Journalist

Enzo Carra (8 August 1943 – 2 February 2023) was an Italian journalist and politician. A member of The Daisy, the Democratic Party, and the Union of the Centre, he served in the Chamber of Deputies from 2001 to 2013.

Carra died in Rome on 2 February 2023, at the age of 79.
