= Christians on the Left =

British Christian socialist society

- Formation: 1960; 66 years ago
- Merger of: Socialist Christian League; Society of Socialist Clergy and Ministers
- Type: Socialist society
- Location: United Kingdom
- Chair: Anna Dixon
- Director: Hannah Rich
- Affiliations: Labour Party; International League of Religious Socialists
- Website: christiansontheleft.org.uk
- Formerly called: Christian Socialist Movement

Christians on the Left, formerly known as the Christian Socialist Movement (CSM), is a socialist society in the UK. The movement fulfils a need among Christian socialists for an organisation that would be both politically engaged and theologically reflective. Christians on the Left is a member organisation of the International League of Religious Socialists. Members have included Labour leaders John Smith, Tony Blair, Gordon Brown, R. H. Tawney, and Donald Soper. In 2009, Christians on the Left has over 40 members in the House of Commons and the House of Lords.

As of March 2025, its director is Hannah Rich and its executive committee chair is Anna Dixon MP.

== History ==
The Christian Socialist Movement was founded in 1960 when the Society of Socialist Clergy and Ministers and the Socialist Christian League merged. R. H. Tawney made one of his last public appearances at the movement's inaugural meeting on 22 January 1960. Donald Soper chaired the movement until becoming its President in 1975. In 1998, it affiliated to the Labour Party. It was a volunteer organisation until 1994 when it appointed a co-ordinator, followed by an administrator. In August 2013, it announced that, following a consultation with its members, it would be changing its name to Christians on the Left.

== Gallery ==
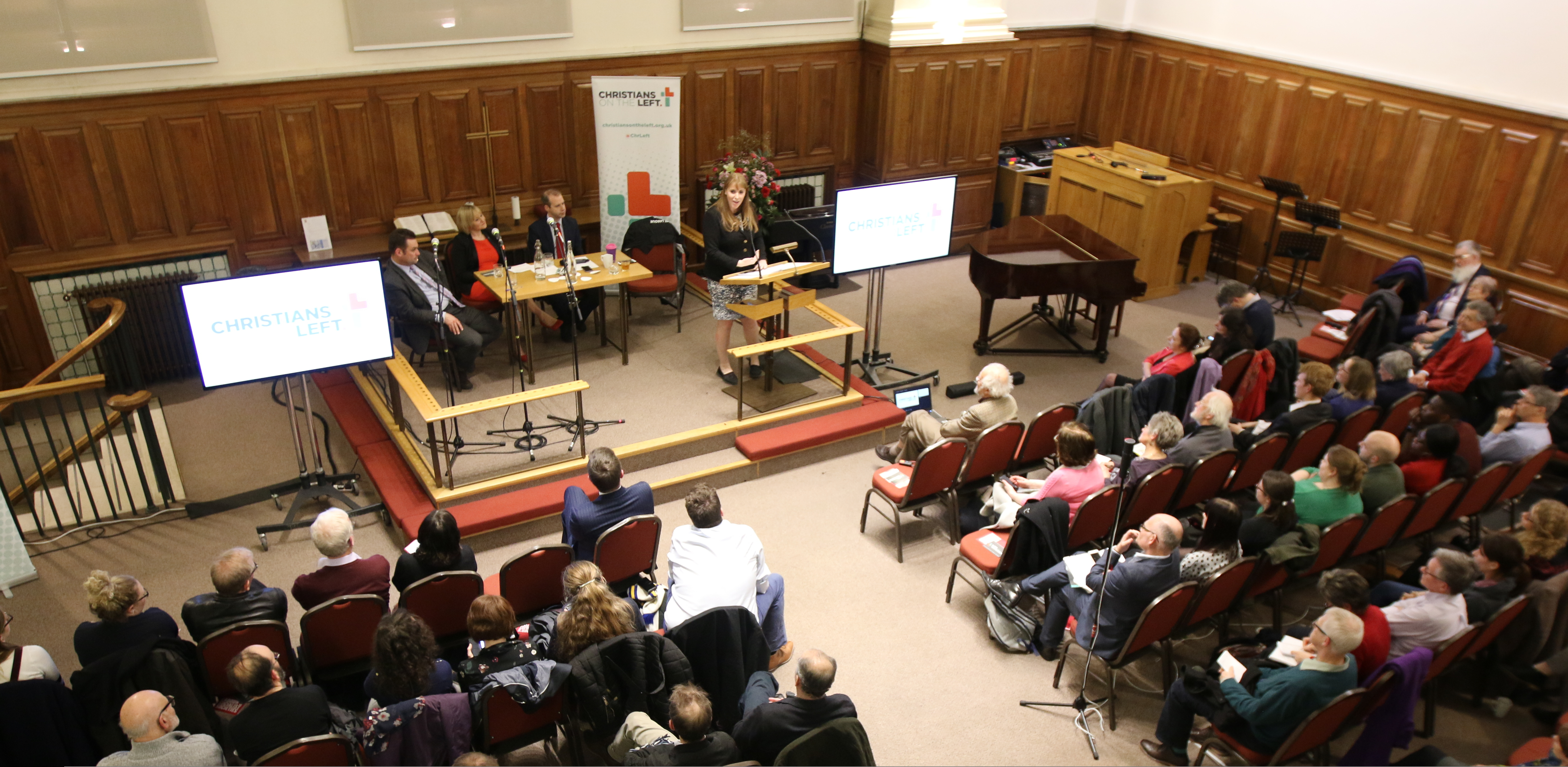
The Tawney Dialogue 2018

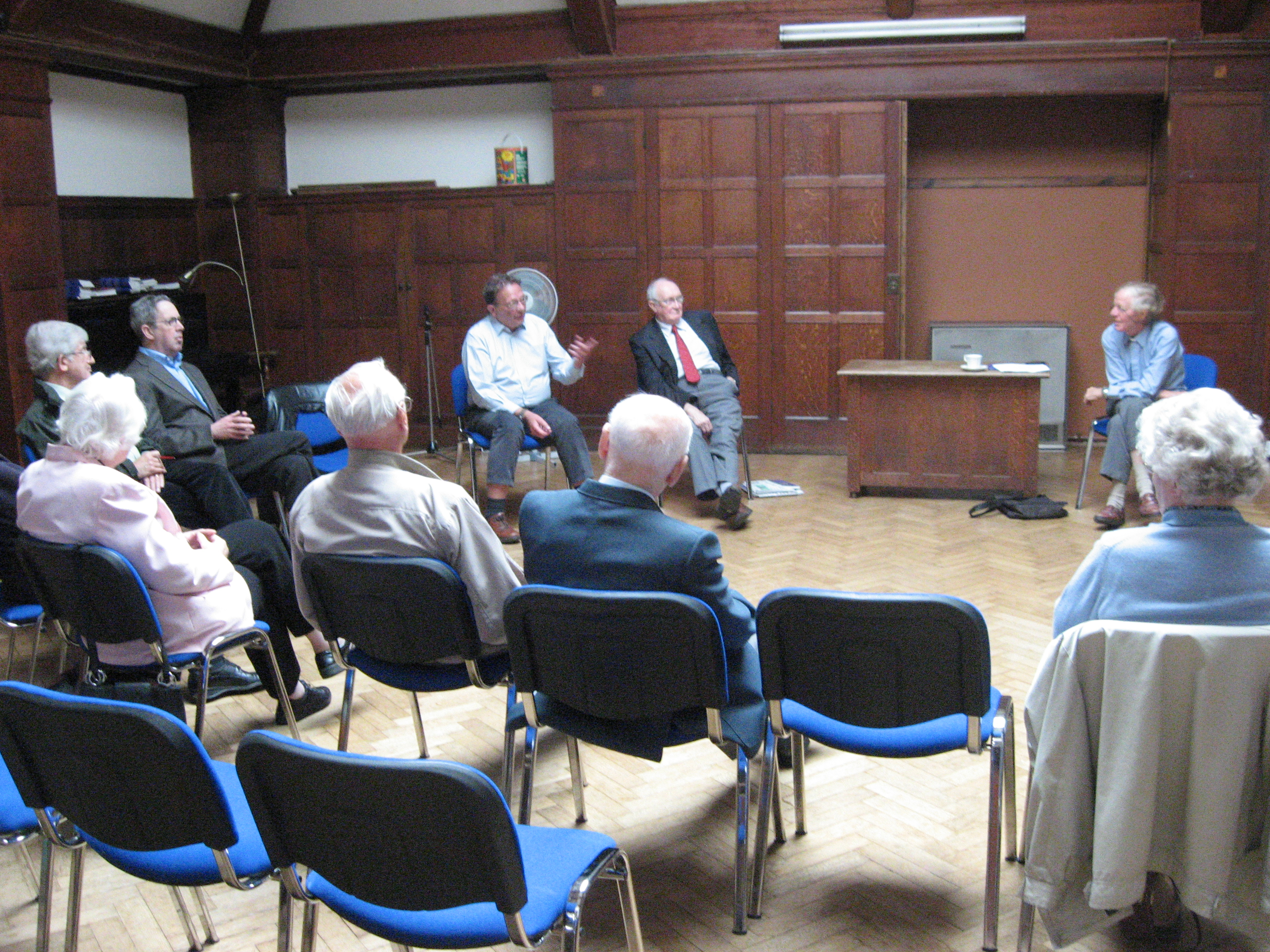
A meeting of the Oxford Branch of the Christian Socialist Movement, with Larry Sanders speaking, October 2007
