= Italian People's Party (1994) =

Italian People's Party Partito Popolare Italiano
- Abbreviation: PPI
- Leaders: Mino Martinazzoli; Rocco Buttiglione; Gerardo Bianco; Franco Marini; Pierluigi Castagnetti
- Founded: 18 January 1994
- Dissolved: 6 December 2002
- Preceded by: Christian Democracy
- Merged into: The Daisy
- Succeeded by: The Populars
- Newspaper: Il Popolo
- Youth wing: Young Populars
- Ideology: Christian democracy Christian left
- Political position: Centre to centre-left
- National affiliation: Pact for Italy (1994); The Olive Tree (1995–2002)
- European affiliation: European People's Party
- European Parliament group: European People's Party
- International affiliation: Christian Democrat International
- Colors: White

The Italian People's Party (Italian: Partito Popolare Italiano, PPI) was a Christian-democratic, centrist and Christian-leftist political party in Italy. The party was a member of the European People's Party (EPP).

The PPI was the formal successor of the Christian Democracy (DC), but was soon deprived of its conservative elements, which successively formed the Christian Democratic Centre (CCD) in 1994 and the United Christian Democrats (CDU) in 1995. The PPI was finally merged into Democracy is Freedom – The Daisy (DL) in 2002, and DL was later merged with the Democrats of the Left (DS) and minor centre-left parties into Democratic Party (PD) in 2007.

== History ==
The party emerged in January 1994 as the successor to the Christian Democracy (DC), Italy's dominant party since World War II, following the final national council of the DC and the split of a right-wing faction led by Pier Ferdinando Casini, which had formed the Christian Democratic Centre (CCD). The first secretary of the PPI was Mino Martinazzoli. He led the party to a severe defeat (11.1% of the vote) in the 1994 general election, fought in coalition with the Segni Pact, under the Pact for Italy banner. It was one of the worst defeats ever suffered by a Western European governing party.

After the election, Martinazzoli was replaced as secretary by conservative philosopher Rocco Buttiglione. In 1995, when his proposal to join the centre-right Pole of Freedoms coalition (composed of Forza Italia, National Alliance and the CCD) was rejected by the party's national council, Buttiglione, along with Roberto Formigoni, Gianfranco Rotondi and other bigwigs, formed the United Christian Democrats (CDU). This essentially left the PPI as the left wing of the former DC. As such, the PPI joined the centre-left coalition.

For the 1996 general election the PPI formed the Populars for Prodi list with the Democratic Union (UD), the Italian Republican Party (PRI) and the South Tyrolean People's Party (SVP). The list was part of The Olive Tree, the formal alliance of the centre-left coalition, and won 6.8% of the vote. The PPI was represented in Romano Prodi's first government by three ministers: Beniamino Andreatta at Defence, Rosy Bindi at Health and Michele Pinto at Agriculture. Additionally, Nicola Mancino was President of the Senate.

In the 1999 European Parliament election the PPI was damaged by the competition from The Democrats (Dem), a centrist and social-liberal party launched by Prodi: the PPI won only 4.3% of the vote, while The Democrats took 7.7%.

For the 2001 general election the PPI formed a joint list with The Democrats, the Union of Democrats for Europe (UDEUR) and Italian Renewal (RI). The list, named Democracy is Freedom – The Daisy (DL), won 14.5% of vote. In 2002 DL was transformed into a full-fledged party, the PPI was merged into it and a cultural association named The Populars was formed. DL would later be merged, along with the Democrats of the Left (DS) and minor centre-left parties, into the Democratic Party (PD), of which The Populars became a faction. Two members of the PPI and DL, Enrico Letta and Matteo Renzi, would successively serve as Prime Ministers in 2013–2016.

== Electoral results ==
=== Italian Parliament ===
Chamber of Deputies
Election year	Votes	%	Seats	+/−	Leader
1994	4,287,172 (4th)	11.1	33 / 630	–	Mino Martinazzoli
1996	2,554,072 (6th)	6.8	67 / 630	▲34	Franco Marini

Senate of the Republic
Election year	Votes	%	Seats	+/−	Leader
1994	5,526,090 (4th)	16.7	27 / 315	–	Mino Martinazzoli
1996	into Ulivo	–	31 / 315	▲4	Franco Marini

=== European Parliament ===
European Parliament
Election year	Votes	%	Seats	+/−	Leader
1994	3,295,337 (4th)	10.0	8 / 87	–	Rosa Russo Iervolino
1999	1,316,830 (8th)	4.2	4 / 87	▼4	Franco Marini

== Leadership ==
- Secretary: Mino Martinazzoli (1994), Rocco Buttiglione (1994–1995), Gerardo Bianco (1995–1997), Franco Marini (1997–1999), Pierluigi Castagnetti (1999–2002)
  - Deputy Secretary: Dario Franceschini (1997–1999), Enrico Letta (1997–1998)
  - Coordinator: Antonello Soro (1997–1998), Dario Franceschini (1998–1999), Lapo Pistelli (1999–2002)
- President: Rosa Russo Iervolino (1994), Giovanni Bianchi (1994–1997), Gerardo Bianco (1997–1999)
- Party Leader in the Chamber of Deputies: Gerardo Bianco (1994), Beniamino Andreatta (1994–1996), Sergio Mattarella (1996–1998), Antonello Soro (1998–2001), Pierluigi Castagnetti (2001–2002)
- Party Leader in the Senate: Gabriele De Rosa (1994), Nicola Mancino (1994–1996), Leopoldo Elia (1996–2001), Paolo Giaretta (2001–2002)
- Party Leader in the European Parliament: Mario Forte (1994), Pierluigi Castagnetti (1994–1999), Guido Bodrato (1999–2002)

== Symbols ==
Before the secession of the CDU, the PPI’s logo was adaptation of the old DC’s logo.

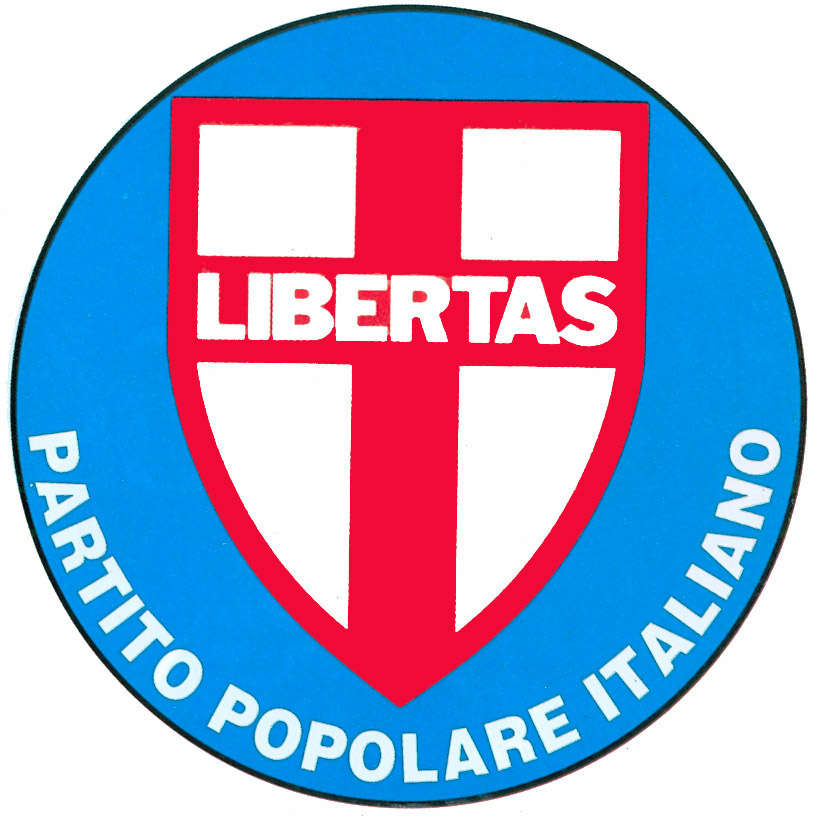
First logo (1994–1995)

Alternative logo
