= Franco Marini =

Italian politician (1933–2021)

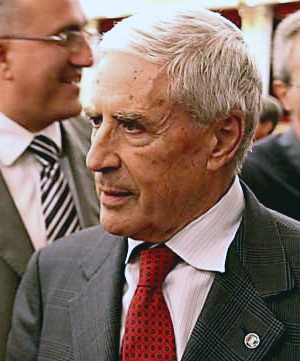

President of the Senate of the Republic
- In office 29 April 2006 – 28 April 2008
- Preceded by: Marcello Pera
- Succeeded by: Renato Schifani

Minister of Labour and Social Security
- In office 12 April 1991 – 28 June 1992
- Prime Minister: Giulio Andreotti
- Preceded by: Rosa Russo Iervolino
- Succeeded by: Nino Cristofori

Secretary of the Italian People's Party
- In office January 1997 – October 1999
- Preceded by: Gerardo Bianco
- Succeeded by: Pierluigi Castagnetti

Secretary-General of the Italian Confederation of Workers' Trade Unions
- In office 6 February 1985 – 13 March 1991
- Preceded by: Pierre Carniti
- Succeeded by: Sergio D'Antoni

Member of the Senate
- In office 28 April 2006 – 15 March 2013
- Constituency: Abruzzo

Member of the Chamber of Deputies
- In office 23 January 1992 – 27 April 2006
- Constituency: Abruzzo

Personal details
- Born: 9 April 1933 San Pio delle Camere, Kingdom of Italy
- Died: 9 February 2021 (aged 87) Rome, Italy
- Party: PD (since 2007)
- Other party: DC (1950–1994); PPI (1994–2002); The Daisy (2002–2007)
- Profession: Trade unionist Politician

Franco Marini (9 April 1933 – 9 February 2021) was an Italian politician and a prominent member of the centre-left Democratic Party. From 2006 to 2008, he was the president of the Senate.

== Biography ==
=== Trade unionist ===
Marini was born in San Pio delle Camere, in the Province of L'Aquila (Abruzzo). A law graduate and trade unionist, Marini joined the Christian Democracy party in 1950 and was elected leader of the Italian Confederation of Workers' Trade Unions (CISL) trade union in 1985. He left CISL in 1991 in order to become the Minister of Labour in the government of Giulio Andreotti.

A candidate in the 1992 Italian general election for Christian Democracy, he was to emerge as the most voted candidate in the country for the leading Italian party at the time. In 1997, Marini was appointed leader of the Italian People's Party, heir of the disbanded Christian Democracy, but he left the position in 1999 because of the party's poor electoral performance in the 1999 European election. After the Italian People's Party became part of Democracy is Freedom – The Daisy, he became the organizational secretary for the newly founded party.

=== President of the Senate ===
After the centre-left Union victory in the 2006 Italian general election, Marini was elected as President of the Senate after three votes; he defeated Giulio Andreotti, the candidate of the House of Freedoms and his former party fellow during the Christian Democracy times, by 165 votes to 156, and succeeded Marcello Pera.

On 30 January 2008, President Giorgio Napolitano summoned Marini to the Quirinale after having met with the different political parties following the vote of no confidence received by the Prodi II Cabinet and the 2008 Italian political crisis it caused. He asked Marini to attempt to form an interim government, which would work to reform electoral laws prior to a new election. Marini decided that his task was impossible on 4 February, after meeting with right-wing leaders Silvio Berlusconi and Gianfranco Fini, because he "could not find a significant majority on a precise electoral reform". Napolitano therefore dissolved Parliament and an early election was called for April 2008. Marini was re-elected to the Senate in that election.

Senator for the Democratic Party, Franco Marini was not re-elected in the February 2013 general election; his term as Senator expired on 15 March 2013.

=== Candidate for the Presidency of Italy ===
On 17 April 2013, the Democratic Party (centre-left), the People of Freedom (centre-right) and Civic Choice (centre) designated Franco Marini as candidate for the presidential election. He failed to win the necessary two-thirds majority in the first round of voting.

=== Death ===
He died in 2021 at the age of 87, a victim of COVID-19 during the COVID-19 pandemic in Italy.

Trade union offices
Preceded by Pierre Carniti	Secretary-General of the Italian; Confederation of Workers' Trade Unions; 1985–1991	Succeeded by Sergio D'Antoni
Political offices
Preceded by Rosa Russo Iervolino	Minister of Labour and Social Security; 1991–1992	Succeeded by Nino Cristofori
Preceded by Marcello Pera	President of the Italian Senate; 2006–2008	Succeeded by Renato Schifani
Party political offices
Preceded by Gerardo Bianco	Secretary of Italian People's Party; 1997–1999	Succeeded by Pierluigi Castagnetti
