= Giovanna Melandri =

Italian politician (born 1962)

Giovanna Melandri DBE
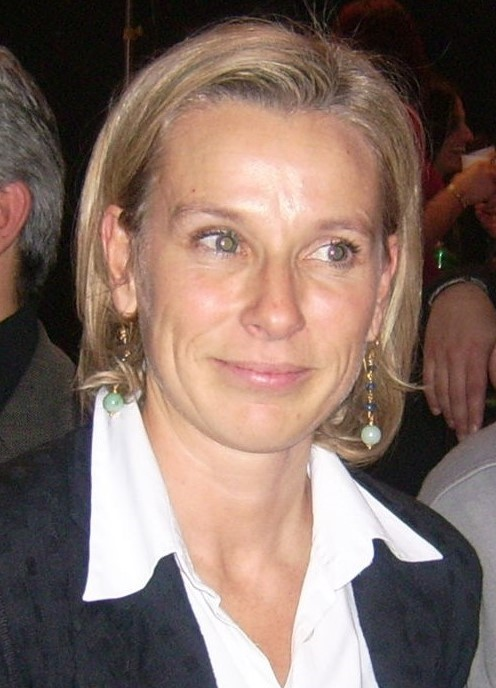

Minister of Youth Policies and Sport
- In office 17 May 2006 – 8 May 2008
- Prime Minister: Romano Prodi
- Preceded by: Office created
- Succeeded by: Giorgia Meloni

Minister of Cultural Heritage and Activities
- In office 21 October 1998 – 11 June 2001
- Prime Minister: Massimo D'Alema; Giuliano Amato
- Preceded by: Walter Veltroni
- Succeeded by: Giuliano Urbani

Member of the Chamber of Deputies
- In office 15 April 1994 – 14 March 2013
- Constituency: Rome (1994–2006); Lazio (2006–2008); Liguria (2008–2013)

Personal details
- Born: 28 January 1962 (age 64) New York City, New York, U.S.
- Party: PDS (1991–1998); DS (1998–2007); PD (since 2007)
- Education: Sapienza University of Rome
- Profession: Politician, economist

Giovanna Melandri DBE (born 28 January 1962) is an American-born Italian politician and expert in cultural policy. She served in the Italian Chamber of Deputies from 1994 to 2012, representing various centre-left political formations. Melandri held ministerial roles in the Italian government, including Minister of Cultural Heritage and Activities (1998–2001) and Minister for Youth Policies and Sport (2006–2008). She later presided over the MAXXI National Museum of 21st Century Arts (2012-2022) in Rome and currently chairs the Human Foundation, a nonprofit organization focused on social innovation.

== Early life and education ==
Born in New York City, Melandri moved to Italy for her education, graduating cum laude in political economy from Sapienza University of Rome.

== Career ==
Between 1983 and 1987, Melandri coordinated a working group focused on industrial and technological policy at Montedison, an Italian chemical company. She subsequently joined Legambiente, an environmental organization in Italy, where she worked in the field of international relations. In 1990, she took part in the Bergen Conference on Sustainable Development, and in 1992, she served as a member of the Italian delegation to the United Nations Conference on Environment and Development (UNCED) in Rio de Janeiro.

In 1991, she joined the national secretariat of the Democratic Party of the Left (PDS), which became the Democrats of the Left (DS) in 1998. From 1998 to 2001, she served as Minister of Cultural Heritage and Activities in the governments of Massimo D'Alema and Giuliano Amato. Between 24 September 2001 and 31 December 2005, she was a member of the Parliamentary Assembly of the Council of Europe.

On 17 May 2006, she was appointed Minister for Youth Policies and Sport in the second Prodi government. In 2007, following the formation of the Democratic Party (PD), she joined the new party as a founding member. She was first elected to the Chamber of Deputies in 1994 with the PDS and was later re-elected in subsequent terms with the DS and the PD.

== Institutional activities ==
From 1992 to 2013, Melandri held leadership roles within the Democratic Party of the Left (PDS), Democrats of the Left (DS), and Democratic Party (PD). During the XII Legislature (1994–1996), she served on the Foreign Affairs Committee and chaired the Committee for Human Rights. She was also a member of the Special Committee on Childhood and contributed to legislative initiatives addressing sexual violence. She coordinated a parliamentary intergroup on bioethics for two years, focusing on topics including artificial reproduction, cloning, and living wills.

In the XIII Legislature (1996–1998), she was a member of the Culture Committee prior to her appointment as Minister of Cultural Heritage and Activities. During this period, she proposed legislation on issues such as adoption, bioethics, assisted reproduction technology, and extradition to countries where the death penalty is practiced. She also introduced bills related to publishing, telecommunications, and public broadcasting. In 1997, she represented Italy at the first World Forum on Television, organized by the United Nations.

From 1998 to 2001, Melandri served as Minister of Cultural Heritage and Activities. During her tenure, public funding for cultural policy reportedly exceeded €3 billion, and tax incentives for cultural investment were introduced. Restoration projects were undertaken, and policies supporting contemporary art and architecture were developed. A national law establishing the MAXXI museum was passed. In 1999, she co-organized the international forum "Culture Counts: Financing Resources and the Economics of Culture and Sustainable Development" in Florence, alongside World Bank president James Wolfensohn and U.S. First Lady Hillary Clinton. In 2000, she participated as the European representative at the White House Conference on Culture and Diplomacy, hosted by President Bill Clinton.

In the XIV Legislature (2001–2006), Melandri was a member of the Foreign Affairs Committee, the Italian parliamentary delegations to the Council of Europe and the Western European Union, and the Parliamentary Supervisory Commission on RAI, the national public broadcaster. She introduced bills relating to cinema, book promotion, and the protection of cultural heritage.

In the XV Legislatire (2006–2008), she was appointed Minister for Youth Policies and Sport. In this role, she launched initiatives such as "Young Ideas Change Italy" (Giovani idee cambiano l'Italia) to support youth entrepreneurship, and "Let's Give Credit" (Diamogli credito), in collaboration with the Associazione Bancaria Italiana. She also established two public funds, one for youth policies and one for inclusive sport initiatives. Together with Giuliano Amato, then Minister of the Interior, she initiated the first Youth Committee for Interreligious Dialogue.

In 2005, Melandri participated in the Alliance of Civilizations, an initiative launched by Spanish and Turkish Prime Ministers José Luis Rodríguez Zapatero and Recep Tayyip Erdogan.

During the XVI Legislature (2008–2013), she was a member of the Committee on Culture, Education, and Science, and was re-elected to the Parliamentary Supervisory Commission on RAI.

== Electoral history ==
Election	House	Constituency	Party	Votes	Result
1994	Chamber of Deputies	Rome Portuense	PDS	35,340	Elected
1996	Chamber of Deputies	Rome Portuense	PDS	39,669	Elected
2001	Chamber of Deputies	Rome Centre	DS	32,006	Elected
2006	Chamber of Deputies	Lazio 1	DS	– (Note: Elected in a closed list proportional representation system)	Elected
2008	Chamber of Deputies	Liguria	PD	–	Elected

== Honors and awards ==
- Honorary Dame Commander of the Civil Division of the Order of the British Empire (UK, 2000)
- Officer of the Legion of Honour (France, 2003; returned in 2020)
