= Democracy is Freedom – The Daisy =

Political party in Italy, 2000–2007

Democracy is Freedom – The Daisy Democrazia è Libertà – La Margherita
- Leader: Francesco Rutelli
- Founded: 12 October 2000 (alliance); 24 March 2002 (party)
- Dissolved: 14 October 2007
- Merger of: Italian People's Party; The Democrats; Italian Renewal
- Merged into: Democratic Party
- Headquarters: Via S. Andrea delle Fratte 16, Rome
- Newspaper: Europa
- Youth wing: Young People of the Daisy
- Membership (2007): 430,000
- Ideology: Social liberalism Christian left
- Political position: Centre to centre-left
- National affiliation: The Olive Tree (2002–07); The Union (2004–07)
- European affiliation: European Democratic Party (2004–07)
- European Parliament group: Alliance of Liberals and Democrats for Europe (2004–07)
- International affiliation: Alliance of Democrats (2004–07)
- Colors: Green Azure

Democracy is Freedom – The Daisy (Italian: Democrazia è Libertà – La Margherita, DL), commonly known simply as The Daisy (La Margherita), was a centrist to centre-left political party in Italy. The party was formed from the merger of three parties within the centre-left coalition: the Italian People's Party, The Democrats and Italian Renewal.

The party president and leader was Francesco Rutelli, former mayor of Rome and prime minister candidate during the 2001 general election for The Olive Tree coalition, within which The Daisy electoral list won 14.5% of the national vote. The Daisy became a single party in February 2002. It was set up by former left-leaning Christian Democrats, centrists, and social-liberals, including former Liberals and Republicans, as well as other left-wing politicians from the former Italian Socialist Party and Federation of the Greens. On 14 October 2007, DL merged with the Democrats of the Left to form the Democratic Party (PD).

== History ==
The idea of uniting the centrist components of The Olive Tree, which were divided in many parties, was discussed at least from 1996. In the 1996 general election, there were actually two centrist lists within the Italian centre-left coalition: the Populars for Prodi, an electoral list including the Italian People's Party (PPI), Democratic Union (UD), the Italian Republican Party (PRI) and the South Tyrolean People's Party (SVP), and that of Italian Renewal (RI), including the Segni Pact (PS) and Italian Socialists (SI), which later merged into the Italian Democratic Socialists (SDI) in 1998. In 1998 splinters from the centre-right coalition formed the Democratic Union for the Republic (UDR), later transformed into Union of Democrats for Europe (UDEUR), to support the D'Alema I Cabinet. In 1999 splinters of PPI, UD and other groups formed The Democrats (Dem), while the Union for the Republic (UpR), a breakaway group from the UDR, the SDI and the PRI joined forces in The Clover, a short-lived alliance.

Between 1998 and 2000, there were several precursors of such idea at the regional and local level in Northeast Italy, notably the Reformist Popular Centre in Friuli-Venezia Giulia, the Daisy Civic List in Trentino, the Autonomist Federation in Aosta Valley and Together for Veneto in Veneto. Initially some of these experiments were intended to include both Christian-inspired parties and secular ones, such as SDI and PRI. However, on 12 October 2000, only PPI, Dem, UDEUR and RI agreed to join forces with a joint list called "The Daisy" for the 2001 general election. The Daisy, led by Francesco Rutelli (who was also candidate for Prime Minister for the whole centre-left), won 14.5% of the vote, only two points less than the Democrats of the Left (DS).

Democracy is Freedom – The Daisy was established as a single party during the founding congress of Parma in March 2002. On that occasion the Italian People's Party, The Democrats and Italian Renewal merged to form the new party, while the UDEUR decided to remain separate. In the 2006 general election, The Daisy was member of the victorious alliance The Union, and won 39 out of 315 senators. The Olive Tree list, of which DL was a member since the 2004 European Parliament election, won 220 seats out of 630 in the Chamber of Deputies. On 14 October 2007, DL, DS and numerous minor parties merged to form the Democratic Party (PD), a unitary centre-left party in anticipation of a move to a two-party system.

== Ideology ==
Democracy Is Freedom was a pro-European centrist party, with a strong support among Catholics, especially progressive ones: the party was described as "social Christian". The party put together social conservatives with social progressives, and economic liberals with social democrats. Many former members of the Italian People's Party, one of the ancestor parties of DL, were members or close supporters of the Italian Confederation of Workers' Trade Unions (CISL), the Catholic trade union.

After the 2004 European elections the new party decided not to become a member of the European Liberal Democrat and Reform Party (ELDR) or of the European People's Party, but founded the European Democratic Party (EDP) together with the Union for French Democracy. In the European Parliament, the EDP and ELDR European parties established the Alliance of Liberals and Democrats for Europe group (ALDE). In 2005, DL participated in the foundation of the Alliance of Democrats, a worldwide network of centrist parties, along with the New Democrat Coalition of the United States Democratic Party, the EDP member parties and the Council of Asian Liberals and Democrats.

== Members ==
Leading members of the party included:

- Former Christian Democrats: Gerardo Bianco, Rosy Bindi, Enzo Carra, Pierluigi Castagnetti, Luigi Cocilovo, Sergio D'Antoni, Ciriaco De Mita, Giuseppe Fioroni, Dario Franceschini, Enrico Letta, Renzo Lusetti, Nicola Mancino, Franco Marini, Sergio Mattarella, Lapo Pistelli, Vittorio Prodi, Rosa Russo Jervolino, Patrizia Toia
- Former Socialists: Laura Fincato, Giuseppe La Ganga, Linda Lanzillotta, Enrico Manca, Pierluigi Mantini, Tiziano Treu
- Former Social Democrats: Franco Bruno, Andrea Papini, Italo Tanoni
- Former Liberals: Cinzia Dato, Natale D'Amico, Lamberto Dini, Valerio Zanone
- Former Republicans: Enzo Bianco, Sandro Gozi, Antonio Maccanico, Roberto Manzione
- Former Radicals: Francesco Rutelli, Roberto Giachetti
- Former Greens: Paolo Gentiloni, Ermete Realacci, Francesco Rutelli, Gianni Vernetti
- Former Communists: Willer Bordon, Massimo Cacciari, Maurizio Fistarol, Antonio Polito

== Factions ==
DL was mainly composed of four factions, the first three of them supporting Francesco Rutelli's leadership:

- Rutelliani. Rutelli's own group, composed of Paolo Gentiloni, Roberto Giachetti, Renzo Lusetti, Ermete Realacci, Gianni Vernetti, Luigi Lusi, Rino Piscitello, Maurizio Fistarol and Riccardo Villari. This group was supportive of the idea of forming a 'Democratic Party' with DS, but they wanted to model it on the United States Democratic Party and for this reason they supported the foundation of the European Democratic Party. Many Rutelliani, including Francesco Rutelli himself, eventually left the Democratic Party to found the Alliance for Italy on 11 November 2009.
- Popolari. This group represented the core of the former Italian People's Party (a leftist Christian democratic party), as Franco Marini, Ciriaco De Mita, Pierluigi Castagnetti, Gerardo Bianco, Nicola Mancino, Enrico Letta, Dario Franceschini, Giuseppe Fioroni, Rosy Bindi, Lapo Pistelli and Sergio D'Antoni. This group supported Rutelli as leader of the party, although there were some differences about the future Democratic Party with DS, as Popolari were proud of their Christian-democratic identity and some of them preferred to re-join the European People's Party, rejecting the idea of joining the Party of European Socialists.
- Teodem. This was a group of socially conservative Christian democrats, formed by Paola Binetti, Luigi Bobba, Enzo Carra, Patrizia Toia, Emanuela Baio Dossi and Marco Calgaro. Usually considered the right wing of the party, they supported Rutelli as leader of the party.
- Ulivisti. This group represented the core of the former Democrats, as Arturo Parisi, Enzo Bianco, Willer Bordon, Antonio Maccanico, Franco Monaco, Pierluigi Mantini, Marina Magistrelli, Roberto Manzione, Cinzia Dato and Giovanni Procacci. This group, very close to Romano Prodi, was the most supportive of the Democratic Party project and tended to be more secular, although most of its members had Catholic connections.

== Popular support ==
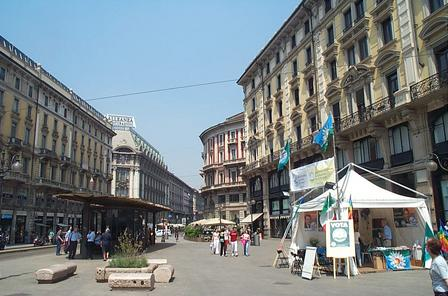
An election campaign street stall for DL in Milan, 2004

The electoral results of Democracy is Freedom – The Daisy in the 10 most populated regions of Italy are shown in the table below. As DL was founded in 2002, the electoral results from 1994 to 2001 refer to the combined result of the precursor parties.

The results of 1994 (general) refer to the combined result of PPI, Segni Pact and AD, those of 1994 to the combined result of PPI and Pact of Democrats (joint-list of Segni Pact and AD, including also SI), those of 1996 (general and Sicilian regional) to the combined result of the joint-list of PPI and UD and RI (whose list was composed of the Segni Pact and SI), those of 1999 (European) and 2000 (regional) to the combined result of PPI, Dem and RI, those of 2001 (general and Sicilian regional) the DL federation (comprising at the time PPI, Dem, UDEUR and RI).

From 2004 (European) the results refer to DL, formed by PPI, Dem and RI, after the defection of UDEUR. The result for the 2006 general election refers to the election for the Senate, indeed DL contested the election for the Chamber of Deputies in a joint list with Democrats of the Left.

	1994 general	1995 regional	1996 general	1999 European	2000 regional	2001 general	2004 European	2005 regional	2006 general
Piedmont	13.1	9.7	9.7	11.3	7.9	15.1	with Ulivo	10.4	11.7
Lombardy	15.0	9.4	10.4	10.1	with Ulivo	15.1	with Ulivo	with Ulivo	10.0
Veneto	21.1	15.0	13.3	12.7	13.7	14.9	with Ulivo	with Ulivo	11.9
Emilia-Romagna	14.8	9.3	11.8	10.9	7.7	15.5	with Ulivo	with Ulivo	9.4
Tuscany	15.7	6.4	10.0	9.1	6.9	13.4	with Ulivo	with Ulivo	9.0
Lazio	14.4	6.0	10.0	11.9	9.6	16.1	with Ulivo	with Ulivo	9.1
Campania	16.8	13.8	12.2	17.9	18.7	12.1	with Ulivo	16.0	12.8
Apulia	22.2	13.6	8.9	16.7	13.7	16.1	with Ulivo	9.7	11.1
Calabria	19.8	15.1	11.0	18.0	13.4	10.7	with Ulivo	14.5	10.3
Sicily	14.2	12.3 (1996)	10.1	19.6	12.3 (2001)	13.9	with Ulivo	12.0 (2006)	11.8
ITALY	18.9	-	11.1	14.6	-	14.5	-	-	10.5

== Electoral results ==
=== Italian Parliament ===
Chamber of Deputies
Election year	Votes	%	Seats	+/−	Leader
2001	5,391,827 (3rd)	14.5	80 / 630	–	Francesco Rutelli
2006	with Ulivo	–	90 / 630	▲10	Francesco Rutelli

Senate of the Republic
Election year	Votes	%	Seats	+/−	Leader
2001	with Ulivo	–	43 / 315	–	Francesco Rutelli
2006	3,664,622 (4th)	10.5	39 / 315	▼4	Francesco Rutelli

=== European Parliament ===
European Parliament
Election year	Votes	%	Seats	+/−	Leader
2004	with Ulivo	–	7 / 72	–	Francesco Rutelli

== Leadership ==
- President: Francesco Rutelli (2001–2007)
- President of the Federal Assembly: Arturo Parisi (2001–2006), Willer Bordon (2006–2007), Enzo Bianco (2007)
- Executive Coordinator: Dario Franceschini (2001–2006), Antonello Soro (2006–2007)
- Organizational Secretary: Franco Marini (2001–2006), Nicodemo Nazzareno Oliverio (2006–2007)
- Party Treasurer: Luigi Lusi (2001–2007)
- Party Leader in the Chamber of Deputies: Pierluigi Castagnetti (2001–2006), Dario Franceschini (leader of The Olive Tree's group, 2006–2007)
- Party Leader in the Senate: Willer Bordon (2001–2006), Luigi Zanda (deputy-leader of The Olive Tree's group, 2006–2007)
- Party Leader in the European Parliament: Lapo Pistelli (2004–2007), Alfonso Andria (2007–2008), Gianluca Susta (2008–2009)

== See also ==
- Liberalism and radicalism in Italy
- Alliance for Italy
