= Ermete Realacci =

Italian politician (born 1955)

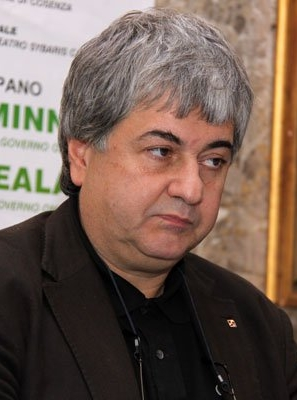

Member of the Chamber of Deputies
- In office 30 May 2001 – 22 March 2018
- Constituency: Pisa (2001–2006); Tuscany (2006–2013); Lombardy (2013–2018)

Personal details
- Born: 1 May 1955 (age 71) Sora, Italy
- Party: The Daisy (2001–2007); Democratic Party (since 2007)
- Profession: Journalist, politician

Ermete Realacci (born 1 May 1955) is an Italian politician who was a member of the Chamber of Deputies from 2001 to 2018. He is also the founder of the environmentalist association Legambiente.

== Career ==
Born on 1 May 1955 in Sora, Lazio, Realacci obtained a diploma from the liceo classico (classical high school). In the early 1970s, he participated in the Christian Animation Movement (MAC). After finishing his studies, he worked as a journalist and publicist. He founded Legambiente, of which he was president from 1987 to 2003 and of which he remained honorary president, making it the most widespread and rooted Italian environmental association in the territory and becoming one of the most exponents of Italian environmentalism. In 2001, as a member of The Daisy (DL), he was elected to the Italian Parliament as a deputy. He was re-elected in 2006. In 2007, he joined the Democratic Party (PD) and was re-elected deputy in 2013 and 2018. In 2008, he served as Minister of the Environment of the Shadow Cabinet of Walter Veltroni.
