= Paola Binetti =

Italian politician, psychiatrist, and academic (born 1943)

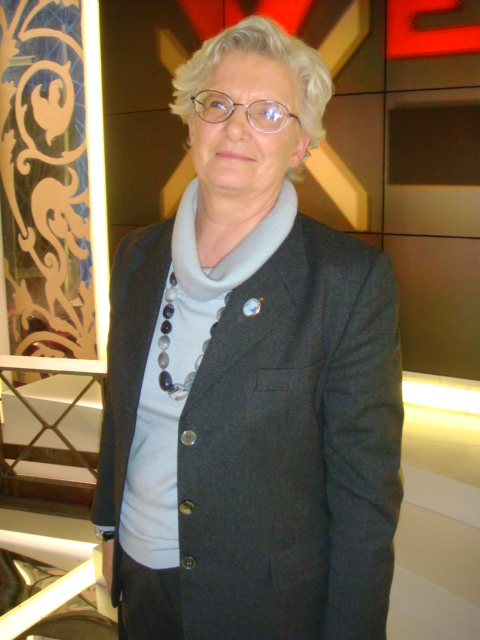

Member of the Senate of the Republic
- Incumbent
- Assumed office 22 March 2018
- In office 28 April 2006 – 29 April 2008

Member of the Chamber of Deputies
- In office 29 April 2008 – 22 March 2018

Personal details
- Born: 29 March 1943 (age 82) Rome, Kingdom of Italy
- Party: DL (2002–2007); PD (2007–2010); UdC (since 2010)

Paola Binetti (born 29 March 1943) is an Italian politician, psychiatrist, and academic.

== Biography ==
Binetti was born in Rome. She graduated in Medicine and Surgery in 1967 at the Università del Sacro Cuore in Rome, subsequently specialising in psychiatry and infant neuropsychiatry at the University of Navarra and the Sapienza University of Rome. She has been a professor at the Campus Bio-Medico University, a private university in Rome founded by the Opus Dei, since its establishment in 1991. She chaired the Committee Science & Life, which was created to oppose the 2005 Italian fertility laws referendum. She has been chairperson of the Italian Society of Medical Education and a member of the National Committee of Bioethics.

In 2006 she was elected to the Italian Senate with The Daisy, a centrist party which merged with others to form the centre-left Democratic Party the following year. She is a numerary member of Opus Dei and has asserted that she wears a cilice.

She was re-elected to the Italian Parliament as a member of the Chamber of Deputies in 2008 and 2013, and again as a Senator in 2018. In 2010 she left the Democratic Party to join the Christian-democratic Union of the Centre.

== Controversies ==
On 3 March 2007, during a show on the La7 channel, Binetti said that gays and lesbians need medical care, maintaining that homosexuality is an illness.
