= Walter Veltroni =

Italian politician (born 1955)

Walter Veltroni OMRI
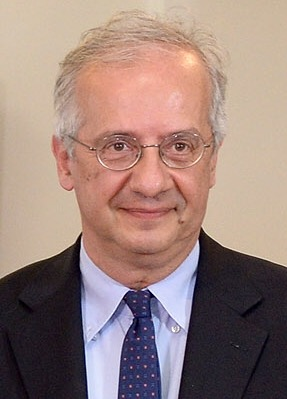
- Veltroni in 2015

Secretary of the Democratic Party
- In office 14 October 2007 – 21 February 2009
- Preceded by: Position established
- Succeeded by: Dario Franceschini

Mayor of Rome
- In office 1 June 2001 – 13 February 2008
- Preceded by: Francesco Rutelli
- Succeeded by: Gianni Alemanno

Deputy Prime Minister of Italy
- In office 17 May 1996 – 21 October 1998
- Prime Minister: Romano Prodi
- Preceded by: Roberto Maroni; Giuseppe Tatarella
- Succeeded by: Sergio Mattarella

Minister of Cultural Heritage
- In office 17 May 1996 – 21 October 1998
- Prime Minister: Romano Prodi
- Preceded by: Antonio Paolucci
- Succeeded by: Giovanna Melandri

Member of the Chamber of Deputies
- In office 29 April 2008 – 14 March 2013
- Constituency: Lazio
- In office 2 July 1987 – 30 May 2001
- Constituency: Rome (1987–1992; 1996–2001); Perugia (1992–1994); Gubbio (1994–1996)

Personal details
- Born: Walter Veltroni; 3 July 1955 (age 70) Rome, Italy
- Party: PCI (1970–1991); PDS (1991–1998); DS (1998–2007); PD (since 2007)
- Height: 1.83 m (6 ft 0 in)
- Spouse: Flavia Prisco
- Children: 2
- Occupation: Film director, ex politician

Walter Veltroni OMRI (Italian pronunciation: [ˈvalter velˈtroːni]; born 3 July 1955) is an Italian writer, film director, journalist and politician. He served as the first leader of the Democratic Party within the Italian centre-left opposition until his resignation on 17 February 2009. He also served as mayor of Rome from June 2001 to February 2008.

== Early life and family ==
Veltroni was born in Rome. His father, Vittorio Veltroni, an eminent RAI manager in the 1950s, died one year after his birth. His mother, Ivanka Kotnik, was the daughter of Ciril Kotnik, a Slovenian diplomat at the Holy See who helped numerous Jews and anti-fascists to escape Nazi persecution after 1943.

== Political career ==
Veltroni joined the Italian Communist Youth Federation (FGCI) at the age of 15, and was elected Rome city councillor in 1976 as a member of the Italian Communist Party (PCI), serving until 1981. He was then elected to the Chamber of Deputies in 1987. As a member of the PCI's national secretariat in 1988, he played a leading role in the transformation into a social democratic party.

Veltroni, a professional journalist, was editor-in-chief of L'Unità, the newspaper of the Democratic Party of the Left (PDS) from 1992 to 1996. He then ran as one of the leading members of The Olive Tree coalition in the 1996 Italian general election. After The Olive Tree's victory, he served as Deputy Prime Minister of Italy and Minister for Cultural Assets and Activities from 1996 to 1998, joining 25 other PDS members in the cabinet, which was the first former PCI members to take part in government since 1947. Also in 1996, he joined the Bilderberg Meeting. In 1998, he resigned, subsequent to his election as National Secretary of the Democrats of the Left (DS). Despite his background as a journalist, he has been involved in controversial episodes related to freedom of expression. For example, in 2001, after the late-night show Satyricon aired an interview that discussed indictments on links between the right-wing leader and the mafia, Marco Travaglio reported that Veltroni dispatched a messenger menacing the closure of the show.

=== Mayor of Rome ===
In 2001, Veltroni resigned as leader of the party after being elected mayor of Rome. In May 2006, Veltroni was confirmed mayor of Rome, easily defeating Gianni Alemanno, a former Minister of Agriculture and then a member of National Alliance, obtaining an unprecedented 61.4% of the valid votes against the 37.1% achieved by Alemanno. The percentage of votes that supported Veltroni's second term in office was a record in local elections in Rome. Shortly before this confirmation, Veltroni had declared that he was going to leave politics at the end of his second term as mayor. In 2005, as mayor of Rome, he met in Washington during a visit to the United States the then United States senator Barack Obama, being one of his earliest supporters overseas. He wrote the preface to the Italian edition of The Audacity of Hope in 2007, and has been referred to as "Obama's European counterpart".

By 2007, Veltroni was widely considered one of the most popular centre-left politicians in Italy, and often singled out for the leadership of the Democratic Party (PD), despite his statements that he would not accept such position after his tenure as mayor would end. In June 2007, DS leader Piero Fassino publicly asked Veltroni to run for the party leadership, offering support from all of his party. Several other PD leading members publicly stated their support for a possible candidacy of Veltroni. Furthermore, the strongest of his possible contenders, Pier Luigi Bersani, which polls showed as having a 50% support in regions of Central and Northern Italy, withdrew to avoid a "confusing candidacy". Veltroni officially presented his candidacy for the leadership of the PD at a rally in Turin on 27 June 2007. At this occasion, he introduced the four key issues his programme would address: environment, generational pact, education, and public security.

=== Leader of the Democratic Party ===
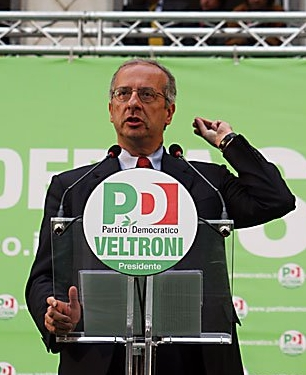
Veltroni during the electoral campaign in April 2008

Veltroni was elected as the first leader of the newly founded PD on 14 October 2007, winning an open primary with around 2.6 million votes, or 75.8%. In 2007, Veltroni had some remarks against the Romanian immigrants, claiming that Italy has become "unlivable" since Romania joined the European Union, while before its entry Rome was "the safest city in the world", bringing accusations of xenophobia from the Romanian press.

Following the 2008 Italian political crisis that led to the defeat of Romano Prodi's government in a January vote in the Senate of the Republic, Veltroni led the PD into the 2008 Italian general election on 13–14 April 2008. Veltroni resigned as mayor of Rome on 13 February 2008 to concentrate on the campaign. He was criticized for his over-frequentation of Rome socialites and was advised to focus on more practical problems.

On 17 February 2009, following clashes within the party and only a day after a heavy defeat of the PD in the 2009 Sardinian regional election, Veltroni announced his immediate resignation from his leadership post. The Constituent Assembly of the party subsequently convened on 21 February 2009 and elected Veltroni's former deputy Dario Franceschini as the new secretary.

== Public image ==
On 28 September 2014, in Venice, Veltroni officiated the wedding of George Clooney and Amal Alamuddin. The wedding was widely reported in the media.

== Awards ==
In 2003, Veltroni received an honoris causa degree in Public Services from the John Cabot University of Rome. In 2006, he received the title of Cavaliere di Gran Croce (Knight of the Grand Cross) from the then-Italian president Carlo Azeglio Ciampi. He won the America Award of the Italy-USA Foundation in 2009.

== Works ==
Veltroni has written a number of books on various topics, such as music, social issues, fiction, biographies, and politics.

- 1977 – Il PCI e la questione giovanile ("The PCI and the Youth Issue")
- 1978 – A dieci anni dal '68. Intervista con Achille Occhetto ("Ten Years Since 1968: Interview with Achille Occhetto")
- 1981 – Il sogno degli anni sessanta ("The Dream of the Sixties")
- 1982 – Il calcio è una scienza da amare ("Football Is a Science to Be Loved")
- 1990 – Io e Berlusconi (e la Rai) ("Me and Berlusconi (and RAI)")
- 1992 – I programmi che hanno cambiato l'Italia ("Programs that Changed Italy")
- 1992 – Il sogno spezzato. Le idee di Robert Kennedy ("The Broken Dream: The ideas of Robert Kennedy")
- 1992 – La sfida interrotta. Le idee di Enrico Berlinguer ("The Interrupted Challenge: The ideas of Enrico Berlinguer")
- 1994 – Certi piccoli amori ("Certain Small Loves")
- 1995 – La bella politica (interview book) ("Politics, the Beautiful")
- 1997 – Certi piccoli amori 2 ("Certain Small Loves 2")
- 1997 – Governare da sinistra ("To Govern from the Left")
- 2000 – I care. Con videocassetta ("I Care: With Videotape")
- 2000 – Forse Dio è malato. Diario di un viaggio africano ("Perhaps God Is Sick: Diary of an African journey")
- 2003 – Il disco del mondo. Vita breve di Luca Flores, musicista ("The Disc of the World: Short Life of Luca Flores, the Musician")
- 2004 – Senza Patricio ("Without Patricio")
- 2006 – La scoperta dell'alba ("Discovery of the Dawn")
- 2007 – Preface to Barack Obama, L'audacia della speranza (The Audacity of Hope)
- 2009 – Noi ("We")
- 2019 – Assassinio a Villa Borghese ("Murder at Villa Borghese" )
- 2024 – La Condanna ("The Sentence")

== Filmography ==
=== Film director ===
- 2014 – Quando c'era Berlinguer ("When Berlinguer Was There")
- 2015 – I bambini sanno ("Children Know")
- 2016 – Gli occhi cambiano ("Eyes Change")
- 2017 – Indizi di felicità ("Clues to Happiness")
- 2018 – Tutto davanti a questi occhi ("All Before These Eyes")
- 2019 – C'è tempo ("There Is Time")

== Electoral history ==
| Election | House | Constituency | Party | Votes | Result |
|---|---|---|---|---|---|
| 1987 | Chamber of Deputies | Rome–Viterbo–Latina–Frosinone | PCI | 19,258 | Elected |
| 1992 | Chamber of Deputies | Perugia–Terni–Rieti | PDS | 25,981 | Elected |
| 1994 | Chamber of Deputies | Gubbio | PDS | 38,815 | Elected |
| 1996 | Chamber of Deputies | Rome Centre | PDS | 35,086 | Elected |
| 2008 | Chamber of Deputies | Lazio 2 | PD | – (Note: Elected in a closed list proportional representation system) | Elected |

=== First-past-the-post elections ===
1994 general election (C): Gubbio
| Candidate | Coalition | Votes | % |
|---|---|---|---|
| Walter Veltroni | Progressives (PDS) | 38,815 | 48.1 |
| Francesca Caccinelli | Pole of Good Government (FI) | 28,445 | 35.3 |
| Marcello Piccini | Pact for Italy (PS) | 13,431 | 16.6 |
| Total | | 80,691 | 100.0 |

1996 general election (C): Rome Centre
| Candidate | Coalition | Votes | % |
|---|---|---|---|
| Walter Veltroni | The Olive Tree (PDS) | 35,086 | 49.9 |
| Filippo Mancuso | Pole for Freedoms (FI) | 32,203 | 45.8 |
| Isabella Rauti | Tricolour Flame | 3,016 | 4.3 |
| Total | | 70,305 | 100.0 |

Media offices
| Preceded by Renzo Foa | Director of L'Unità; 1992–1996 | Succeeded by Giuseppe Caldarola |
Political offices
| Preceded by Roberto Maroni | Deputy Prime Minister of Italy; 1996–1998 | Succeeded by Sergio Mattarella |
| Preceded by Giuseppe Tatarella | Deputy Prime Minister of Italy; 1996–1998 | Succeeded by Sergio Mattarella |
| Preceded by Antonio Paolucci | Minister of Cultural Heritage; 1996–1998 | Succeeded by Giovanna Melandri |
| Preceded by Francesco Rutelli | Mayor of Rome; 2001–2008 | Succeeded by Gianni Alemanno |
Party political offices
| Preceded by Massimo D'Alema | Secretary of the Democrats of the Left; 1998–2001 | Succeeded by Piero Fassino |
| New political party | Secretary of the Democratic Party; 2007–2009 | Succeeded by Dario Franceschini |
