= 2023 Democratic Party leadership election =

Election of the Secretary of the Italian Democratic Party

- 26 February 2023

600 delegates to the National Assembly of the Democratic Party 301 delegate votes needed to win
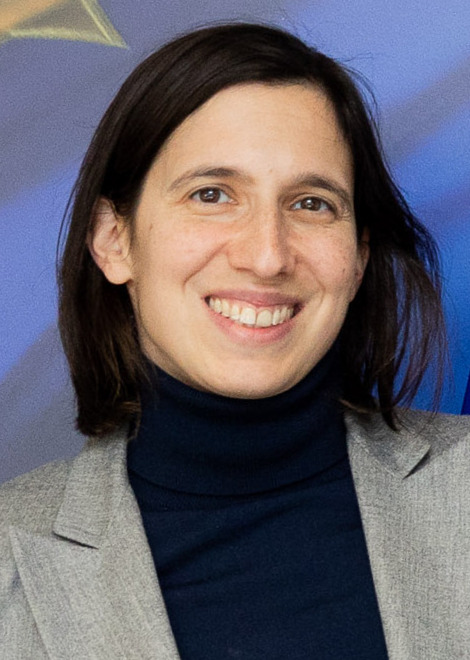

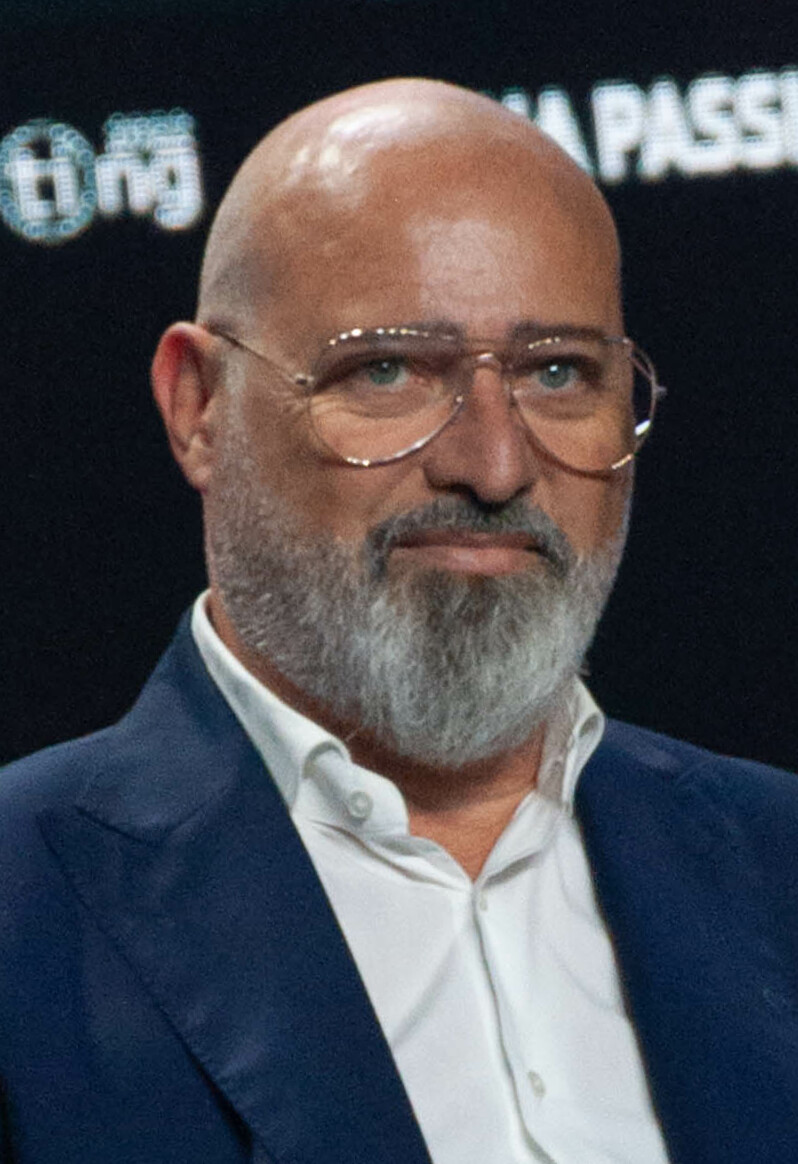
Nominee	Elly Schlein	Stefano Bonaccini
Members' vote	52,637 (34.9%)	79,787 (52.9%)
Popular vote	587,010 (53.8%)	505,032 (46.2%)
Delegate count	333	267
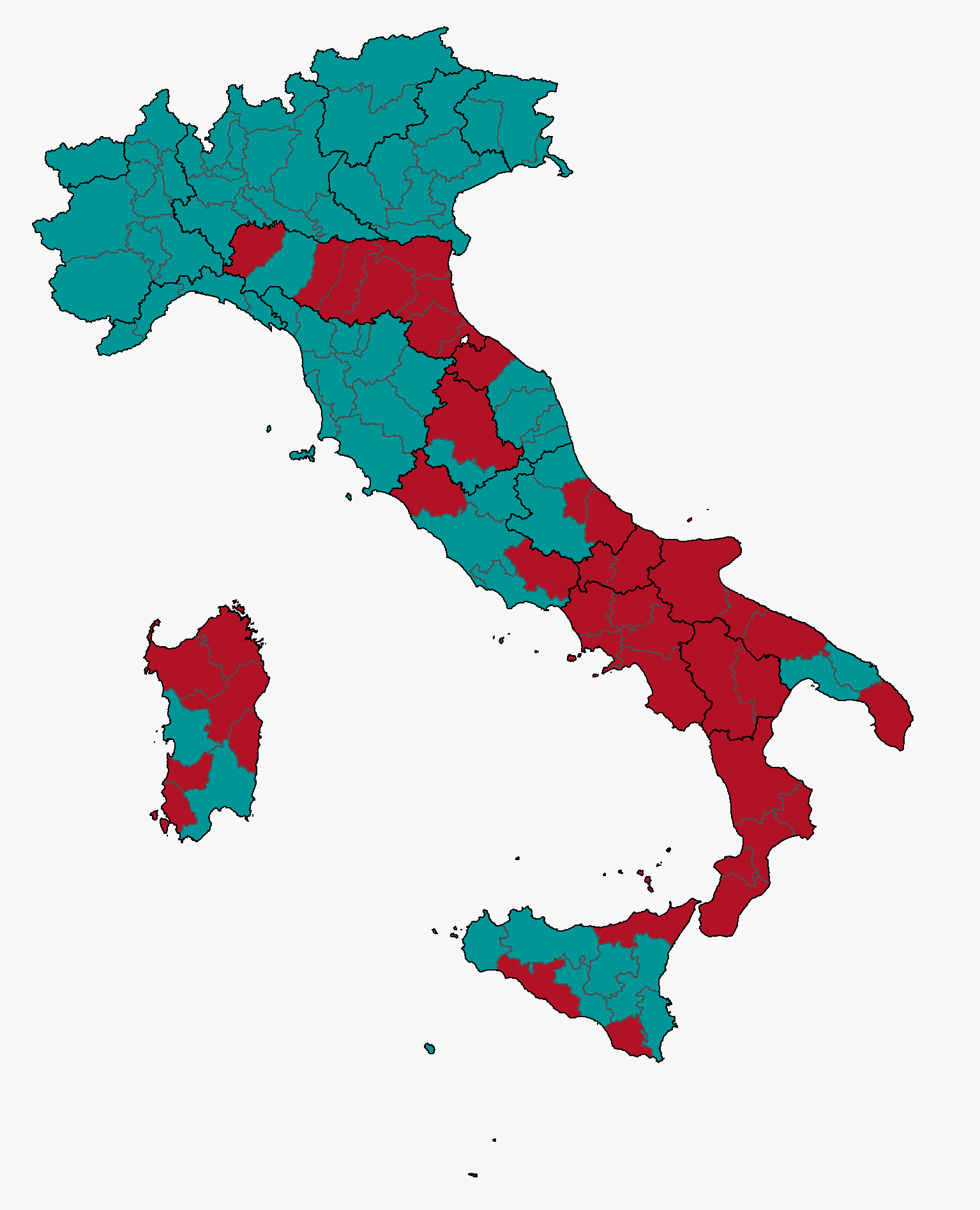
- Primary election results map. Cyan denotes provinces with a Schlein plurality and Red denotes those with a Bonaccini plurality.
Previous Secretary
Enrico Letta
Elected Secretary
Elly Schlein

The 2023 Democratic Party leadership election was a primary election that was held in Italy in February 2023 to elect the National Assembly and secretary of the Italian Democratic Party (PD). It consisted of a closed primary election among party members held from 9 to 19 February, and an open primary election held on 26 February.

Four candidates ran in the closed primary election held in circle conventions: Stefano Bonaccini, Gianni Cuperlo, Paola De Micheli, and Elly Schlein. Bonaccini and Schlein advanced to the open primary election, where Schlein won with over 53% of the vote, becoming the first woman and the youngest person to ever serve as leader of the PD, as well as the first openly LGBT leader of a major Italian political party. The results of the election defied the predictions of nearly all polling firms, which had anticipated a Bonaccini victory. It was the PD's first party leadership election in which the winner of the members' vote lost in the open primary.

== Electoral process ==
The process consists of two phases: a first round, in which only members of the PD can vote, and a second round, a runoff between the two candidates who got the most votes in the first round, in which every citizen who identifies with the party's ideals can vote. The PD is the only major Italian party that allows non-members to elect the secretary by open primary.

The term of office of the secretary is usually four years, along with the National Assembly; when the former resign in advance, the National Assembly can choose whether to elect another secretary, who would serve until the natural expiration of the mandate is reached, or to dissolve the National Assembly itself earlier and call a new leadership election.

After the outgoing secretary tenders their resignation, the party president must gather the members of the National Assembly within a month. On the same day, the National Assembly would elect the members of the National Committee for the Congress, which would act in place of the elected bodies until the end of the leadership election, whose main job is drafting the rules of the details procedure under which the leadership election is to take place. The National Committee also handles internal disputes and appeals relating to the leadership election.

The National Committee elects its president and sets the rules and the dates, and lay them before the National Board. The election must take place within four months following the secretary's resignation.

=== Timetable ===
Timetable of events for the 2023 Democratic Party leadership election
Date(s)	Event
24 November	The National Board elects the National Committee and the Commission for the Congress. Start of the primaries.
22 January	The National Assembly approves the Manifesto of Values and Principles.
27 January	Presentation of the candidacies supported by at least the 20% of the members of the National Assembly or by 4,000 members.
12 February	Enrollment on the local branch for new members closed.
3–19 February	Closed primaries take place in Circle Conventions.
26 February	Open primaries to elect the Secretary and the National Assembly.
12 March	The National Assembly announces the winner.

== Candidates ==
=== Candidates who progressed to the final round ===
On 20 February 2023, the following individuals were the two top contenders in the closed vote in party circles, thus entering the primary open to voters.

Portrait	Name	Most recent position	Campaign logo	Slogan	Announced	Refs
	Stefano Bonaccini (age 59)	President of Emilia-Romagna (2014–2024) Other positions: President of the Conference of the Regions and Autonomous Provinces (2016–2021); Regional Secretary of the Democratic Party of Emilia-Romagna (2009–2015)	(stefanobonaccini.it)	Energia Popolare (People's Energy)	20 November 2022	
	Elly Schlein (age 41)	Vice President of Emilia-Romagna (2020–2022) Other positions: Member of the Chamber of Deputies (2022–present); Member of the European Parliament (2014–2019)	(ellyschlein.it)	Parte da Noi (It Starts with Us)	4 December 2022	

=== Before vote by party members ===
On 20 February 2023, the following individuals didn't manage to get enough votes in party circles to enter the primary open to voters.

Portrait	Name	Most recent position	Campaign logo	Slogan	Announced	Refs
	Gianni Cuperlo (age 65)	President of the Democratic Party (2013–2014) Other positions: Member of the Chamber of Deputies (2006–2018; 2022–present); Secretary of the Youth Left (1990–1992); Secretary of the Italian Communist Youth Federation (1988–1990)	(giannicuperlo.it)	Promessa Democratica (Democratic Promise)	23 December 2022	
	Paola De Micheli (age 53)	Minister of Infrastructure and Transport (2019–2021) Other positions: Member of the Chamber of Deputies (2008–present); Special Commissioner for the reconstruction of the affected areas from 2016–17 Central Italy earthquakes (2017–2018); Deputy secretary of the Democratic Party (2019)	(paolademicheli.it)	Concretamente (Concretely)	27 September 2022	

=== Declined to be candidates ===
The following individuals have been the subject of speculation about their possible candidacy, but have publicly denied interest in running.

- Enrico Letta, Member of the Chamber of Deputies (2021–present, 2001–2015), Secretary of the Democratic Party (2021–present), Prime Minister of Italy (2013–2014), Deputy secretary of the Democratic Party (2009–2013), Secretary of the Council of Ministers (2006–2008), Member of the European Parliament (2004–2006), Minister for the Community Policies (1998–1999), Deputy secretary of the Italian People's Party (1997–1998), Minister of Industry, Commerce and Crafts (1996–1998)

=== Endorsements ===
==== Candidates who progressed to the final round ====
===== Stefano Bonaccini =====
Stefano Bonaccini

Former Ministers

- Roberta Pinotti, Minister of Defence (2014–2018), Member of the Senate of the Republic (2008—2022), Member of the Chamber of Deputies (2001–2008)
- Lorenzo Guerini, Minister of Defence (2019–2022) Member of the Chamber of Deputies (2013–present); President of the Parliamentary Committee for the Intelligence and Security Services and for State Secret Control (2022–present); Deputy Secretary of the Democratic Party (2014–-2017); Mayor of Lodi (2005–2012); President of the province of Lodi (1995–2004)

Senators

- Carlo Cottarelli
- Simona Malpezzi, Leader in the Senate (2021–present); Undersecretary of State for Relations with Parliament (2019–2021)
- Enrico Borghi

Former

- Andrea Marcucci

Deputies

- Anna Ascani, Member of the Chamber of Deputies (2013–present); Vice President of the Chamber of Deputies (2022-present); Vice President of the Democratic Party (2019-present); Undersecretary for Economic Development (2021–2022); Deputy Minister of Education (2020–2021); Undersecretary of State to the Presidency of the Council of Ministers (2020); Undersecretary for Education, University and Research (2019-2020)
- Debora Serracchiani, Member of the Chamber of Deputies (2018–present); Leader in the Chamber of Deputies (2021–present); Deputy President of the Democratic Party (2021–present); President of Friuli-Venezia Giulia (2013–2018); Deputy Secretary of Democratic Party (2014–2017)
- Graziano Delrio, Leader in the Chamber of Deputies (2018–2021); Minister of Infrastructure and Transport (2015–2018); Minister for Regional Affairs and Autonomies (2013–2014)
- Piero Fassino
- Andrea De Maria
- Matteo Orfini
- Lia Quartapelle

Former

- Carmelo Miceli (politician)
- Alessia Morani
- Patrizia Prestipino
- Fausto Raciti
- Andrea Rossi

Members of the European Parliament

- Brando Benifei
- Paolo De Castro
- Dino Giarrusso
- Pina Picierno
- Irene Tinagli, Deputy Secretary of the Democratic Party (2021–present)

Presidents of Regions

- Vincenzo De Luca — President of Campania (2015–present), Mayor of Salerno (1993–2001, 2006–2015), Member of the Chamber of Deputies (2001–2008)
- Michele Emiliano — President of Apulia (2015–present), Mayor of Bari (2004–2014)
- Eugenio Giani — President of Tuscany (2020–present), President of the Regional Council of Tuscany (2015–2020), President of the Municipal Council of Florence (2009–2014), Municipal Councillor of Florence (1990–2014)

Former

- Claudio Burlando — President of Liguria (2005–2015), Minister of Transports and Navigation (1996–1998), Member of the Chamber of Deputies (1996–2006), Mayor of Genoa (1992–1993)
- Catiuscia Marini — President of Umbria (2010–2019), Member of the European Parliament (2008–2009), Mayor of Todi (1997–2007)

Mayors

- Antonio Decaro — Mayor of Bari (2014–present), Metropolitan Mayor of Bari (2015–present), President of the National Association of Italian Comunes (2016–present), Member of the Chamber of Deputies (2013–2014)
- Giorgio Gori — Mayor of Bergamo (2014–present)
- Stefano Lo Russo — Mayor of Turin (2021–present), Metropolitan Mayor of Turin (2021–present)
- Valeria Mancinelli — Mayor of Ancona (2013–present)
- Dario Nardella — Member of the Chamber of Deputies (2013–2014), Mayor of Florence (2014–present), Metropolitan Mayor of Florence (2015–present)
- Matteo Ricci — Mayor of Pesaro (2014–present), President of the province of Pesaro and Urbino (2009–2014), Vice-president of the Democratic Party (2013–2017)
- Jamil Sadegholvaad — Mayor of Rimini (2021–present)
- Katia Tarasconi — Mayor of Piacenza (2022–present)

Other politicians

- Paolo Calvano – Assessor of budget of Emilia-Romagna (2020–present)

===== Elly Schlein =====
Elly Schlein

Former Ministers

- Fabrizio Barca, Minister of Territorial Cohesion (2011–2013)
- Pier Luigi Bersani, Secretary of the Democratic Party (2009–2013), Minister of Economic Development (2006–2008), Minister of Transports and Navigation (1999–2001), Minister of Industry, Commerce and Craftmanship (1996–1999), President of Emilia-Romagna (1993–1996), Member of the European Parliament (2004–2006), Member of the Chamber of Deputies (2001–2004; 2004–2006)
- Francesco Boccia, Minister of Regional Affairs and Autonomies (2019–2021), Member of the Senate of the Republic (2022–present), Member of the Chamber of Deputies (2008–2022)
- Cesare Damiano, Minister of Labour and Social Policies (2006–2008), Member of the Chamber of Deputies (2006–2018)
- Dario Franceschini, Minister of Culture (2014–2018; 2019–2022), Minister for Parliamentary Relations (2013–2014), Secretary of the Democratic Party (2009), Member of the Senate of the Republic (2022–present), Member of the Chamber of Deputies (2001–2022)
- Beatrice Lorenzin, Minister of Health (2013–2018), Member of the Senate of the Republic (2022–present), Member of the Chamber of Deputies (2008–2022)
- Andrea Orlando, Minister of Labour and Social Policies (2021–2022), Minister of Justice (2014–2018), Member of the Chamber of Deputies (2006–present), Minister of the Environment (2013–2014), Deputy secretary of the Democratic Party (2019–2021)
- Giuseppe Provenzano, Minister of South (2019–2021), Member of the Chamber of Deputies (2022–present), Deputy secretary of the Democratic Party (2021–present)
- Livia Turco, Minister of Health (2006–2008), Minister for Social Solidarity (1996–2001), Member of the Senate of the Republic (2006–2008), Member of the Chamber of Deputies (1987–2006; 2008–2013)

Senators

- Susanna Camusso, Member of the Senate of the Republic (2022–present), former General Secretary of the Italian General Confederation of Labour (2010–2019)
- Andrea Crisanti
- Cecilia D'Elia
- Franco Mirabelli
- Antonio Misiani
- Anna Rossomando
- Ylenia Zambito

Former

- Monica Cirinnà
- Sergio Lo Giudice
- Gianfranco Pasquino
- Sandro Ruotolo
- Ugo Sposetti

Deputies

- Anthony Barbagallo
- Laura Boldrini, former President of the Chamber of Deputies (2013–2018), Member of the Chamber of Deputies (2013–present)
- Chiara Braga, Head of Ecological Transition, Sustainability and Infrastructure
- Michela Di Biase
- Federico Fornaro
- Emiliano Fossi
- Marco Furfaro
- Valentina Ghio
- Chiara Gribaudo
- Roberto Morassut
- Luca Pastorino
- Marco Sarracino
- Arturo Scotto
- Stefano Vaccari
- Alessandro Zan
- Nicola Zingaretti, former President of Lazio (2013–2022), former President of the province of Rome (2008–2012), Secretary of the Democratic Party (2019–2021), Member of the Chamber of Deputies (2022–present)

Former

- Susanna Cenni
- Andrea Maestri
- Marco Miccoli
- Rossella Muroni
- Erasmo Palazzotto
- Emma Petitti
- Marina Sereni, former Deputy Minister for Foreign Affairs (2019–2022)
- Elisa Simoni

Members of the European Parliament

- Camilla Laureti
- Pierfrancesco Majorino

Former

- Goffredo Bettini

Presidents of Regions

Former

- Vasco Errani — President of Emilia Romagna (1999–2014), President of the Conference of the Regions and Autonomous Provinces (2005–2014), Member of the Senate of the Republic (2018–2022)

Mayors

- Valentina Cuppi – Mayor of Marzabotto (2019–present), President of the Democratic Party (2020–present)
- Michele Franchi – Mayor of Arquata del Tronto (2021–present)
- Matteo Lepore — Mayor of Bologna (2021–present), Metropolitan Mayor of Bologna (2021–present)
- Patrizia Manassero — Mayor of Cuneo (2022–present), Member of the Senate of the Republic (2013–2018)
- Raffaella Mariani – Mayor of San Romano in Garfagnana (2019–present), Member of the Chamber of Deputies (2001–2018)
- Giuseppe Paolini – Mayor of Isola del Piano (2010–present), President of the province of Pesaro and Urbino (2018–present)

Former

- Stefania Bonaldi – Mayor of Crema (2012–2022)
- Giuseppe Chicchi — Mayor of Rimini (1992–1993; 1993–1999), Member of the Chamber of Deputies (2006–2008)
- Marco Doria — Mayor of Genoa (2012–2017), Metropolitan Mayor of Genoa (2015–2017)
- Alessandro Tambellini — Mayor of Lucca (2012–2022)
- Marta Vincenzi — Mayor of Genoa (2007–2012), President of the province of Genoa (1993–2002), Member of the European Parliament (2004–2007)

Other politicians

- Marta Bonafoni – Regional Councillor of Lazio (2013–present)
- Caterina Cerroni – Secretary of the Young Democrats (2021–present)
- Jasmine Cristallo – Member of the Sardines movement
- Ariel Dello Strologo – Municipal Councillor of Genoa (2022–present)
- Iacopo Melio – Regional Councillor of Toscana (2020–present)
- Achille Occhetto – Secretary of the Democratic Party of the Left (1991–1994), Secretary of the Italian Communist Party (1988–1991), Member of the Senate of the Republic (2001–2006), Member of the European Parliament (1989–1999; 2006–2007), Member of the Chamber of Deputies (1976–2001)
- Matteo Rossi – Former President of the province of Bergamo (2014–2018)
- Mauro Salizzoni – Regional Councillor of Piedmont (2019–present)
- Ferruccio Sansa – Regional Councillor of Liguria (2020–present)
- Mattia Santori – Municipal Councillor of Bologna (2021–present); Leader of Sardines movement (2019–2020)

Non-political personalities

- Claudio Amendola, actor
- Gabriella Genisi, writer
- Lino Guanciale, actor
- Levante, singer
- Oliviero Toscani, photographer
- Paola Turci, singer

==== Before vote by party members ====
===== Gianni Cuperlo =====
Gianni Cuperlo

Former Ministers

- Barbara Pollastrini, Minister for Equal Opportunities (2006–2008), Vice-president of the Democratic Party (2017–2019), Member of the Chamber of Deputies (1992–1994; 2001–2022)

Senators

Former

- Luigi Zanda

Presidents of Regions

Former

- Mario Oliverio — President of Calabria (2014–2020), President of the province of Cosenza (2004–2014), Member of the Chamber of Deputies (1992–2006), Mayor of San Giovanni in Fiore (1990–1991)

===== Paola De Micheli =====
Paola De Micheli

Deputies

Former

- Enza Bruno Bossio

Other politicians

- Lorenza Bonaccorsi — President of the Municipio I of Rome

== Electoral debates ==
2023 Democratic Party leadership election debates
Date	Organiser	Moderator	P Present I Invitee NI Non-invitee A Absent invitee			
Date	Organiser	Moderator	Bonaccini	Cuperlo	De Micheli	Schlein
22 January	Rai 3 (Mezz'ora in più)	Lucia Annunziata	P	P	P	P
20 February	Sky TG24 (Il Confronto)	Fabio Vitale	P	NI	NI	P

== Opinion polls ==
=== Advanced candidates ===
Date	Polling firm	Sample size			Don't know	Lead
Date	Polling firm	Sample size	Bonaccini	Schlein	Don't know	Lead
26 Feb	Primary election	—N/a	46.2	53.8	—	7.6
23 Feb	BiDiMedia	Between interested voters	38.0	31.0	31.0	7.0
22 Feb	Euromedia Stat	Between interested voters	48.2	13.5	38.3	29.3
22 Feb	Euromedia Stat	Between PD voters	55.1	21.2	23.7	33.9
20–22 Feb	Demos & Pi	Between interested voters	57.0	30.0	13.0	27.0
20–22 Feb	Demos & Pi	Between PD voters	67.0	31.0	2.0	36.0
21 Feb	Izi	Between interested voters	54.2	45.8	—N/a	8.4

=== Before vote by party members ===
Date	Polling firm	Sample size					Others – Don't know	Lead
Date	Polling firm	Sample size	Bonaccini	Cuperlo	De Micheli	Schlein	Others – Don't know	Lead
19 Feb	Bonaccini and Schlein advance to open primary election De Micheli endorsed Bonaccini, Cuperlo leaves freedom of choice							
15 Feb	EMG	Between PD voters	63.0–67.0	—N/a	—N/a	33.0–37.0	0.0 Others Don't know 0.0	30.0
13 Feb	Intwig	Between PD voters	61.0	—N/a	—N/a	39.0	0.0 Others Don't know 0.0	22.0
11–12 Feb	Winpoll	Between PD voters	43.7	—N/a	—N/a	56.3	0.0 Others Don't know 0.0	12.6
25 Jan	Euromedia	Between PD voters	54.0	6.3	7.8	18.1	12.8 Others Don't know 0.0	35.9
23 Jan	EMG	Between PD voters	44.0	7.0	9.0	24.0	2.0 Others Don't know 14.0	20.0
17 Jan	Winpoll	Between PD voters	46.0	7.0	6.0	41.0	0.0 Others Don't know 0.0	5.0
17 Jan	Winpoll	Between PD voters	51.5	—N/a	—N/a	48.5	0.0 Others Don't know 0.0	3.0
16 Jan	EMG	Between PD voters	41.0	9.0	10.0	23.0	3.0 Others Don't know 14.0	18.0
9–13 Jan	EMG	Between PD voters	61.0–65.0	—N/a	—N/a	35.0–39.0	0.0 Others Don't know 0.0	26.0
9 Jan	EMG	Between PD voters	41.0	6.0	10.0	24.0	6.0 Others Don't know 13.0	17.0
2 Jan	EMG	Between PD voters	43.0	7.0	9.0	23.0	10.0 Others Don't know 8.0	20.0

=== Hypothetical polls ===
Date	Polling firm	Sample size										Others – Don't know	Lead
Date	Polling firm	Sample size	Boccia	Bonaccini	Cuperlo	De Luca	De Micheli	Nardella	Provenzano	Ricci	Schlein	Others – Don't know	Lead
23 Dec	Gianni Cuperlo announces his intention to run												
19 Dec	EMG	Between interested voters	—N/a	45.0	—N/a	—N/a	9.0	—N/a	—N/a	—N/a	25.0	6.0 Others Don't know 15.0	20.0
8–12 Dec	BiDiMedia	Between interested voters	—N/a	57.0	—N/a	—N/a	2.0	—N/a	—N/a	2.0	39.0	20.0 Others Don't know 20.0	18.0
7 Dec	EMG	Between PD voters	—N/a	65.0–69.0	—N/a	—N/a	—N/a	—N/a	—N/a	—N/a	31.0–35.0	0.0 Others Don't know 0.0	34.0
4 Dec	Elly Schlein announces her intention to run												
29 Nov	EMG	Between PD voters	—N/a	32.0	—N/a	—N/a	11.0	15.0	2.0	4.0	17.0	12.0 Others Don't know 12.0	15.0
29 Nov	Euromedia	Between PD voters	4.5	25.9	—N/a	5.9	3.3	2.5	1.5	0.6	21.4	34.3 Others Don't know 34.3	4.5
21 Nov	Demos & Pi	Between PD voters	—N/a	32.0	—N/a	—N/a	—N/a	—N/a	—N/a	—N/a	8.0	25.0 Others Don't know 35.0	24.0
20 Nov	Stefano Bonaccini announces his intention to run												
19 Nov	Euromedia	Between PD voters	4.5	25.9	—N/a	5.9	3.3	2.5	1.5	0.6	21.4	34.3 Others Don't know 34.3	4.5
30 Oct	Euromedia	800	6.4	16.9	—N/a	—N/a	4.7	3.1	1.6	1.4	12.0	54.5 Others Tinagli: 2.1; Others 4.7; Don't know 47.7	4.9
30 Oct	Euromedia	Between PD voters	4.6	22.9	—N/a	—N/a	5.7	1.0	1.4	0.5	26.1	37.9 Others Tinagli: 2.1; Others 1.3; Don't know 34.5	3.2
27 Sep	Paola De Micheli announces her intention to run												

== Results ==
=== Vote by party members ===
Candidate	Votes	%
Stefano Bonaccini	79,787	52.87
Elly Schlein	52,637	34.88
Gianni Cuperlo	12,008	7.96
Paola De Micheli	6,475	4.29
Total valid votes	150,907	100.0
Invalid/blank votes	623	–
Total votes	151,530	100.0
Source: Partito Democratico – Results

Member vote
Bonaccini	52.87%
Schlein	34.88%
Cuperlo	7.96%
De Micheli	4.29%

=== Primary election ===
Candidate	Votes	%	Delegates
Elly Schlein	587,010	53.75	333
Stefano Bonaccini	505,032	46.25	267
Total valid votes	1,092,042	100.0	
Invalid/blank votes	6,581	–	
Total votes	1,098,623	100.0	–
Source: Partito Democratico — results

Popular vote
Schlein	53.75%
Bonaccini	46.25%

=== Results by regions ===
Region	Bonaccini	Schlein
Abruzzo	50.3	49.7
Aosta Valley	29.3	70.7
Apulia	55.9	44.1
Basilicata	61.5	38.5
Calabria	64.5	35.5
Campania	68.5	31.5
Emilia-Romagna	56.4	43.6
Friuli-Venezia Giulia	36.1	63.9
Lazio	37.4	62.6
Liguria	32.7	67.3
Lombardy	34.9	65.1
Marche	45.4	54.6
Molise	69.4	30.6
Piedmont	33.8	66.2
Sardinia	57.1	42.9
Sicily	43.2	56.8
Trentino-Alto Adige/Südtirol	36.5	63.5
Tuscany	38.1	61.9
Umbria	47.9	52.1
Veneto	36.3	63.7
World	44.0	56.0
Source: Partito Democratico — results
