= Left is Change =

Left is Change Sinistra è Cambiamento
- Leader: Maurizio Martina
- Founded: June 2015
- Dissolved: 2017
- Ideology: Social democracy Democratic socialism
- Political position: Left-wing

Left is Change (Sinistra è Cambiamento, SèC) was a social-democratic faction within the Democratic Party (PD), a political party in Italy. Most of its members hailed from the Democrats of the Left (DS).

The faction was formed, mainly by splinters of Remake Italy and Reformist Area, in June 2015. At its foundation, the faction counted around 70 MPs, notably including Maurizio Martina (minister of Agriculture in Renzi Cabinet), Cesare Damiano, Anna Finocchiaro, Matteo Mauri, Enzo Amendola, Paola De Micheli and Luciano Pizzetti. Differently from other left-wing factions, notably Reformist Area, SèC wanted to cooperate with Matteo Renzi, PD leader and Prime Minister.

In the run-up of the 2017 leadership election, Martina and the majority of SèC chose to support Renzi, while a minority led by Damiano and Finocchiaro, endorsed Andrea Orlando of Remake Italy. The followers of Martina formed Future! European Democrats, while those of Damiano re-organised themselves as the Dem Labourites.
