= Antonio Misiani =

Italian politician (born 1968)

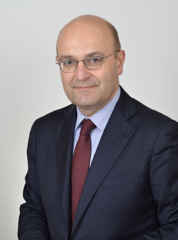

Member of the Senate
- Incumbent
- Assumed office 23 March 2018
- Constituency: Lombardy (2018–2022); Milan (since 2022)

Member of the Chamber of Deputies
- In office 28 April 2006 – 23 March 2018
- Constituency: Lombardy 2

Personal details
- Born: 4 September 1968 (age 58) Bergamo, Italy
- Party: PDS (till 1998); DS (1998–2007); PD (since 2007)
- Education: Bocconi University
- Profession: Financial advisor

Antonio Misiani (born 4 September 1968) is an Italian politician. He was Deputy Minister of Economy and Finance in the Conte II Cabinet.

== Early life and education ==
Misiani was born 4 September 1968 in Bergamo, Lombardy, and was raised there. He graduated from the "Paolo Sarpi" high school. He attended the Luigi Bocconi University in Milan, where he graduated with a degree in Political Economy.

== Political career ==
Misiani's political interests started in the early 1990s when he became active in the Left Youth and the Democratic Party of the Left. In the institutions he was elected municipal councillor in Bergamo in 1995 (playing the role of vice president of the budget commission) and provincial councillor in 1999 and 2004 (member of the budget commission). As a member of the Federal Committee and the Provincial Secretariat of the Democratic Party of the Left (1997 – 1998) he was coordinator of the forum of the Bergamo left.

Between 2000 and 2004, Misiani was part of the regional secretariat of the Democrats of the Left. On 14 April 2004 Misiani was elected provincial-secretary of the Bergamo Left Democrats, a position he held until December 2004. From July 2004 to August 2006 Misiani was councillor of the Municipality of Bergamo in the Giunta led by Roberto Bruni, dealing with budget, decentralization, subsidiaries, communication, security, heritage, cemetery services. In the 2006 general elections, Misiani was elected into the Chamber of Deputies, on the L'Ulivo lists in the Lombardy 2 constituency.

In the Legislature XV of Italy he was a member of the V Budget, Treasury and Planning Commission, of the bicameral commissions for the Simplification of Legislation and the Implementation of Fiscal Federalism. He joined the Democratic Party in 2007. In the primaries of 14 October 2007, he was elected a member of the National Constituent Assembly of the Democratic Party of the Left. In the 2008 elections he was re-elected deputy on the Democratic Party lists for the same constituency. During the Legislature XVI of Italy he was again a member of the V Budget, Treasury and Planning Commission and of the bicameral Commission for the Simplification of Legislation. Misiani collaborated with the Nens Association (New Economy, New Company) founded by Pier Luigi Bersani and Vincenzo Visco.

During the 2013 elections, he was re-elected deputy. In the 2017 PD congress he sided in support of Andrea Orlando. On 7 May 2017 Misiani was elected a member of the National Directorate of the PD. In the 2018 political elections he was elected senator, on the Democratic Party lists in the Lombardy district. In the Senate Misiani is the leader of the PD in the Budget Commission. On 13 September 2019, he was appointed Deputy Minister of Economy and Finance.

== Personal life ==
Misiani is married to Maria Ines and has two children.

== Works ==
In 2017, Misiani, along with Stefano Imbruglia and Paola De Micheli, wrote the book Se chiudi ti compro. Le imprese rigenerate dai lavoratori", and published with a preface penned by Romano Prodi.
