= 2017 Democratic Party (Italy) leadership election =

Political party contest

2017 Democratic Party leadership election
- 30 April 2017
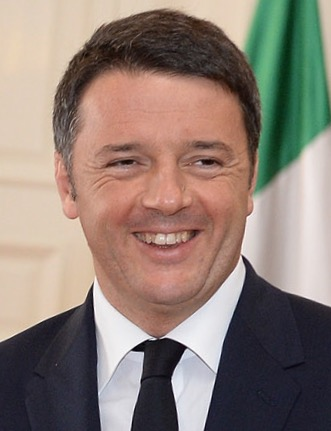

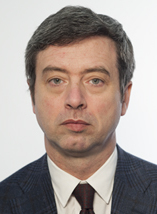

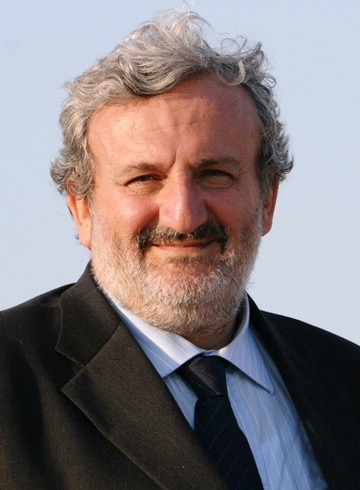
Nominee	Matteo Renzi	Andrea Orlando	Michele Emiliano
Delegate count	700	212	88
Popular vote	1,257,091	362,691	197,630
Percentage	69.2%	20.0%	10.9%
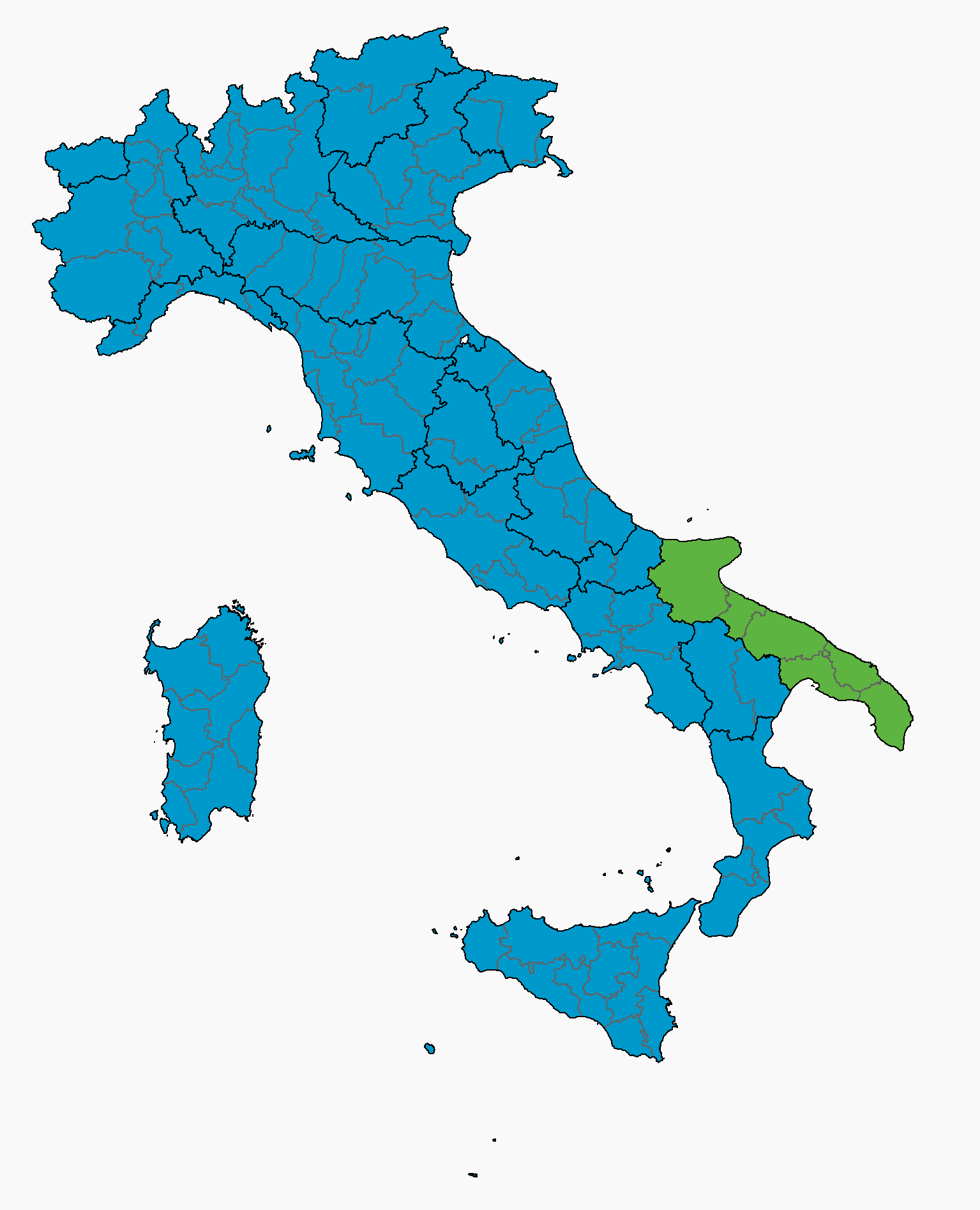
- Primary election results map. Azure denotes provinces with a Renzi plurality and Green denotes those with a Emiliano plurality.
Secretary before election
Matteo Orfini (Acting)
Elected Secretary
Matteo Renzi

The 2017 Democratic Party leadership election was an open primary election held on 30 April 2017. The three candidates were Matteo Renzi, former Prime Minister and party secretary until February 2017, Michele Emiliano, President of Apulia, and Andrea Orlando, the Minister of Justice. Renzi was elected by a landslide 70%, and appointed Maurizio Martina as his deputy secretary.

== Electoral process ==
Candidates were required to file their candidacies by 6 March 2017.

Local and provincial conventions then take place all around the country, where party members vote on the candidates for secretary. Under party rules, the candidates who receive the support of at least the 15% of voting party members in local conventions, or the three most voted candidates above 5% of the vote, qualify for the second round of the race and have the chance to present their platform at the national convention.

The candidates who will run in an open primary will be declared at the national convention, which will take place on 30 April. Voters will also elect the national assembly of the party and the regional secretaries and assemblies. If no candidate wins more than 50% of the vote, a run-off between the two candidates with the most votes will take place in the national assembly, scheduled within two weeks after the primary election.

== Background ==
=== 2016 constitutional referendum ===
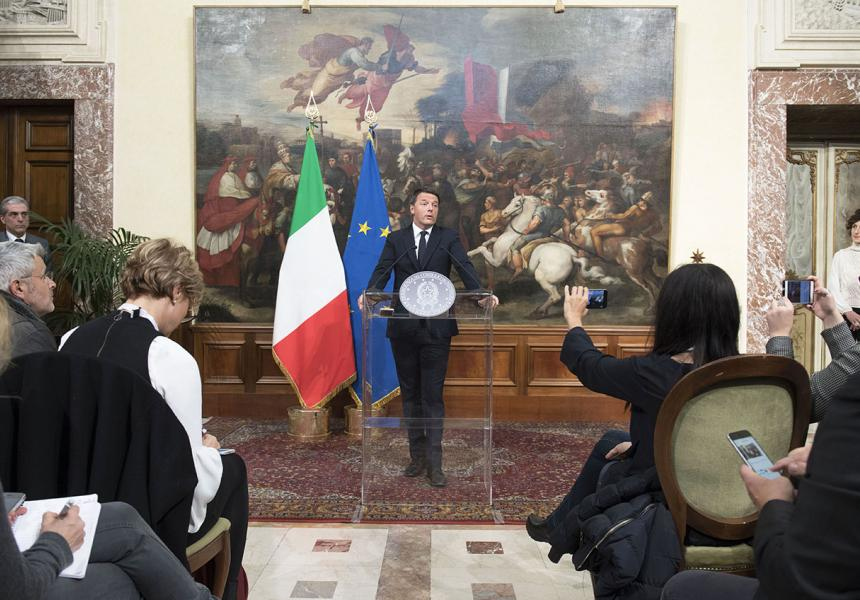
Renzi announcing his resignation after the referendum result

After constitutional reforms had passed both the Chamber of Deputies and the Senate multiple times, Prime Minister Matteo Renzi announced that he would hold a constitutional referendum on 4 December 2016 to seek approval for the changes; whilst the reform was approved by a simple majority of the Parliament, it did not achieve the two thirds necessary to avoid a referendum, as per Article 138 of the Italian Constitution.

Voters were asked whether they approved of amending the Constitution to transform the Senate of the Republic into a "Senate of Regions", with 100 members made up of regional councillors and mayors of large cities, akin to Germany's Bundesrat. The reform would diminish the size of the Italian senate from 315 to 100, making all senators indirectly elected by regional councils and mayors. In addition, the reform makes it impossible for the senate to veto legislation most legislation, instead only having a delay power except for a select number of subjects.

Following early results which indicated that the "No" side was clearly ahead, Renzi conceded defeat and resigned.

=== Internal developments ===
After the referendum senior members of the PD such as Enrico Rossi, President of Tuscany region, and Roberto Speranza, former Democratic leader in the Chamber of Deputies and head of the Reformist Area faction, announced their intentions to run as party secretary. After a few weeks the Governor of Apulia region, Michele Emiliano, also announced his candidacy to stand for the leadership of the party.

On 28 January 2017, the former Prime Minister Massimo D'Alema launched a new political movement Consenso ("Consensus"), in strong opposition to Renzi's policies; D'Alema call for a party congress and threatened to split from the party if Renzi didn't announce it.

In February Renzi announced that he planned to resign as secretary, convene the congress and run in the primary election in spring. However the left-wing minority called for the congress in autumn, giving lesser-known candidates the opportunity to organize their campaigns; Emiliano, Rossi and Speranza, but also many important PD members like former secretaries Pier Luigi Bersani and Guglielmo Epifani, announced that they will leave the party if Renzi would convene the congress in spring.

During the National Assembly on 19 February, Renzi resigned as Secretary of the party, announcing his candidacy for the next leadership election. On the same day Rossi, Speranza and other members of the minority like Bersani, D'Alema and 40 parliamentarians declared that they will exit from the PD after Renzi's decisions and established Article One.

On 21 February, Emiliano stated that he will not exit from the party and will face Renzi in the leadership election. On 23 February the Minister of Justice Andrea Orlando, supported by prominent left-wing Democrats like Cesare Damiano and Gianni Cuperlo, announced his candidacy as party leader. On the same day Carlotta Salerno, the Turin city secretary of the Moderates, stated that she would run as PD secretary, even if she is not a party member, but this was forbidden by the statute.

On 24 February the Democratic National Committee indicated April 30 as the date of the primary election.

== Candidates ==
Matteo Renzi is considered by many a centrist and liberal politician; even if he often described himself as a progressive, the nature of his progressivism is a matter of debate and has been linked both to liberalism and populism. Renzi is supported by the majority of the party's factions like his own one, Renziani, the AreaDem of Dario Franceschini, The Populars of Giuseppe Fioroni, a majority of Left is Change, led by his deputy secretary candidate Maurizio Martina, a minority of Remake Italy, of PD's president and acting secretary Matteo Orfini, and Liberal PD of Enzo Bianco.

Michele Emiliano is an outspoken former magistrate with strong support in the poor South, who was expected to join the dissidents in DP movement but decided instead to challenge Renzi from within the mainstream party. He is often described as a democratic socialist and populist politician. He came from the left wing of the party and he is supported by several Democratic members from Southern Italy, especially Apulia (of which Emiliano is President), but also by former Lettiani, the political faction of the former prime minister Enrico Letta, who Renzi forced to resign.

Andrea Orlando is a social democratic politician and a leading member of the party since the foundation. Orlando is often described as the candidate of the social democratic establishment of the party; he is supported by a majority of Remake Italy, of which he is the leader, by a minority of Left is Change, whose main members are Cesare Damiano and Anna Finocchiaro, by LeftDem of Gianni Cuperlo, and by several former leading Veltroniani, Lettiani, Bindiani and Olivists.

=== Summary ===
Portrait	Name	Most recent position	Campaign logo	Refs
	Matteo Renzi (1975– )	56th Prime Minister of Italy (2014–2016) Other positions: Secretary of the Democratic Party (2013–2017); Mayor of Florence (2009–2014); President of Florence Province (2004–2009)		
	Andrea Orlando (1969– )	Minister of Justice (2014–2018) Other positions: Member of the Chamber of Deputies (2006–present); Minister of the Environment (2013–2014)		
	Michele Emiliano (1959– )	President of Apulia (2015–present) Other positions: Mayor of Bari (2004–2014)		

== Electoral campaign ==
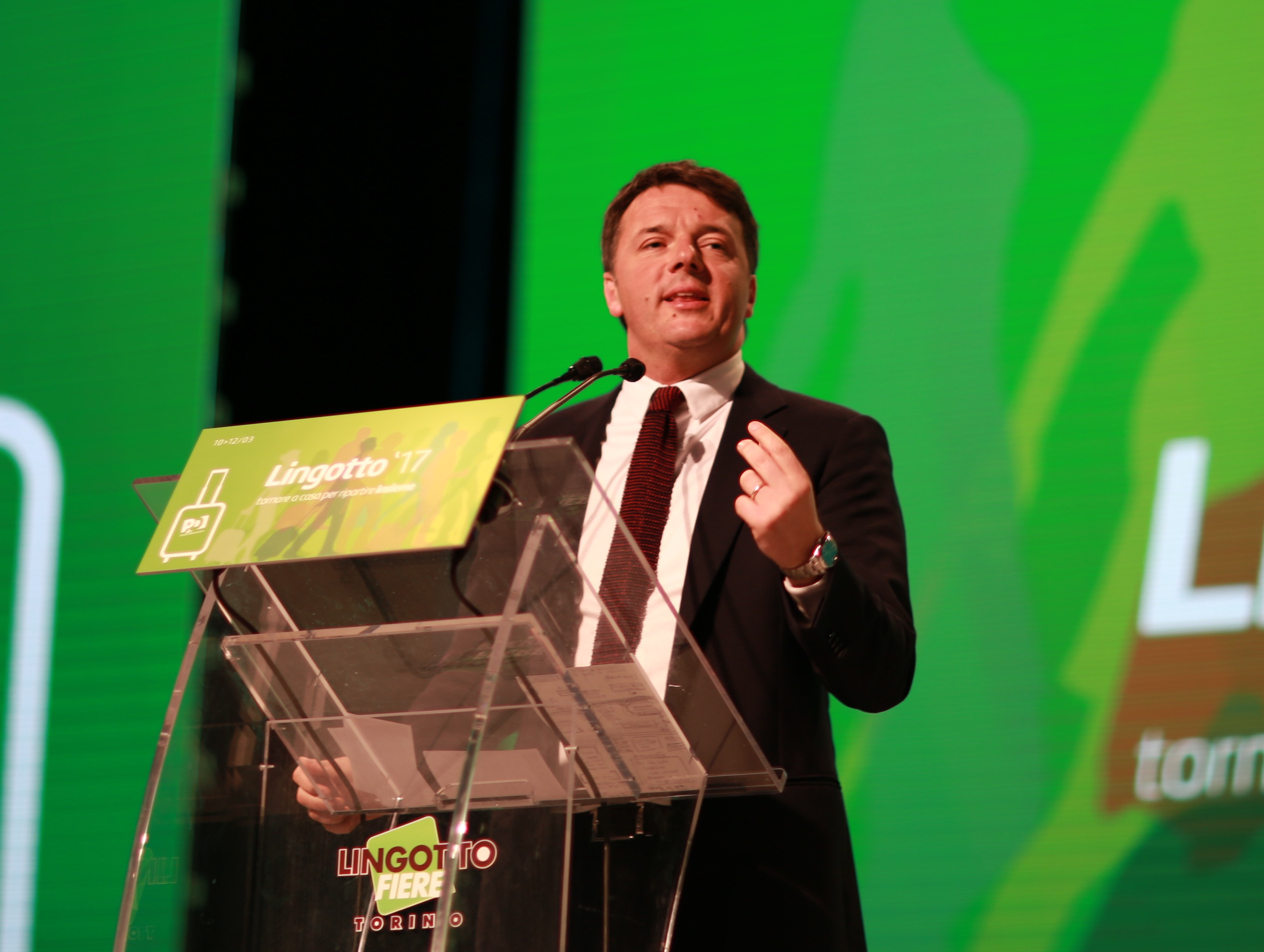
Renzi speaking at Lingotto convention

On 6 March, Matteo Renzi presented his electoral programme with the slogans "Forward, together" (Avanti, insieme) and "On the Move" (In Cammino), in which he expressed his intention to renovate the party, Italy and Europe. He also announced an electoral ticket with the Agriculture Minister Maurizio Martina; Martina will become Deputy Secretary and will probably lead the party if Renzi becomes Prime Minister again.

From 10 to 12 March, Renzi and his supporters participated in Lingotto '17, a convention based in Lingotto district in Turin, where the Democratic Party was founded ten years before under the leadership of Walter Veltroni. During his speech he harshly condemned the Five Star Movement (M5S), which he accused of being a populist party controlled by a private company, and Lega Nord, which he claimed uses fear to gain votes. Renzi attacked also European bureaucrats and proposed primary election to appoint the Party of European Socialists candidate for the European Commission presidency and the direct election of the president.

Among the notable participants of the pro-Renzi convention were Prime Minister Paolo Gentiloni, current ministers like Pier Carlo Padoan, Dario Franceschini, Graziano Delrio, Marianna Madia, Roberta Pinotti and Secretary Maria Elena Boschi. Emma Bonino, historic Radical leader and former Foreign Affairs Minister, also participated in the rally.

On 10 March, Michele Emiliano presented his electoral programme with the slogans "We are Party" (Noi siamo partito) and "Italy is our Party" (L'Italia è il nostro partito). He described his candidacy as a revolution, and stated that he wanted a party closer to the people, especially the poorest, accusing Renzi of drastically changing the PD and of abandoning people on low incomes. He also accused Orlando, who was Justice Minister also in Renzi's government, of supporting Matteo Renzi's liberal and centrist policies and not to have ever opposed his reforms. Emiliano also added that as Secretary he will not run to become Prime Minister, as Renzi did from February 2014 to December 2016. The Apulia Governor asked for M5S, Article One (Art.1), Progressive Camp and Italian Left (SI) supporters to vote for him to beat Renzi; his intention is to build a centre-left to left-wing alliance composed of PD, Art.1 and SI, which can cooperate with the M5S.

During the conference call to present his candidacy, Andrea Orlando stated that he is the only one who can unite the party after the split of the left-wing faction which founded the Art.1; his slogan is "Unite Italy, unite the PD" (Unire l'Italia, unire il PD). He added that he would create an electoral coalition inspired by The Olive Tree, the political alliance led by Romano Prodi, who won 1996 and 2006 general elections. Orlando stated that if he wins the election, he will leave the Ministry of Justice.

== Opinion polls ==
Date	Polling firm	Renzi	Emiliano	Orlando	Others	Lead
24 Apr	Piepoli	75.0	7.0	18.0	0.0	57.0
21–23 Apr	EMG	65.4	13.1	21.5	0.0	43.9
20–21 Apr	ScenariPolitici	72.0	11.0	17.0	0.0	55.0
19 Apr	Index	62.0	11.0	28.0	0.0	34.0
12 Apr	Ixè	57.0	9.0	16.0	18.0	39.0
12 Apr	Index	61.0	10.0	29.0	0.0	32.0
5 Apr	Ixè	52.0	10.0	21.0	17.0	31.0
3 Apr	Piepoli	65.0	14.0	21.0	0.0	44.0
30 Mar–3 Apr	Bidimedia	66.0	11.0	23.0	0.0	43.0
31 Mar–2 Apr	EMG	67.0	10.0	23.0	0.0	44.0
27 Mar	Piepoli	65.0	14.0	21.0	0.0	44.0
22 Mar	Ixè	55.0	13.0	17.0	0.0	38.0
22 Mar	Index	56.0	18.0	26.0	0.0	30.0
15–17 Mar	ScenariPolitici	62.0	18.0	20.0	0.0	31.0
15 Mar	Index	55.0	21.0	24.0	0.0	31.0
15 Mar	Ixè	54.0	13.0	20.0	13.0	34.0
13–15 Mar	Piepoli	75.0	6.0	19.0	0.0	56.0
13–15 Mar	SWG	65.0	19.0	16.0	0.0	46.0
12 Mar	Euromedia	56.2	19.1	24.7	0.0	31.5
12 Mar	Tecnè	53.0	17.0	31.0	9.0	22.0
9–10 Mar	ScenariPolitici	64.0	19.0	17.0	0.0	45.0
6–9 Mar	Bidimedia	61.0	12.0	27.0	0.0	34.0
8 Mar	Index	52.0	22.0	23.0	3.0	29.0
8 Mar	Ixè	58.0	8.0	20.0	14.0	38.0
7–8 Mar	Ipsos	53.0	8.0	25.0	14.0	28.0
6–8 Mar	SWG	63.0	21.0	16.0	0.0	42.0
1 Mar	Index	55.0	20.0	22.0	3.0	33.0
1 Mar	Ixè	58.0	5.0	17.0	20.0	41.0
27 Feb–1 Mar	SWG	61.0	23.0	16.0	0.0	38.0
22–24 Feb	ScenariPolitici	61.0	21.0	18.0	0.0	40.0

== Results ==
=== Vote by party members ===
Candidate	Votes	%
Matteo Renzi	176,657	66.73
Andrea Orlando	66,842	25.25
Michele Emiliano	21,220	8.02
Total valid votes	264,719	100.0
Invalid/blank votes	1,335	–
Total votes	266,054	100.0
Source: Official results

Vote by party members
Renzi	66.73%
Orlando	25.25%
Emiliano	8.02%

=== Primary election ===
Candidate	Votes	%	Delegates
Matteo Renzi	1,257,091	69.17	700
Andrea Orlando	362,691	19.96	212
Michele Emiliano	197,630	10.87	88
Total valid votes	1,817,412	100.0	1,000
Invalid/blank votes	21,526	–	–
Total votes	1,838,938	100.0	1,000
Source: Official results

Popular vote
Renzi	69.17%
Orlando	19.96%
Emiliano	10.87%

=== Delegates summary ===
Portrait	Name	Delegates
	Matteo Renzi	700/1000 (70%)
	Andrea Orlando	212/1000 (21%)
	Michele Emiliano	88/1000 (9%)

=== Results by Regions ===
Renzi won an absolute majority in all regions except for Apulia, Emiliano's homeregion. Renzi's strongest performances were in the so-called "Red Regions", in Umbria (80.9%), in his homeregion Tuscany (79.14%), in the neighbouring Marche (78.7%) and in Emilia-Romagna (74.0%), the weakest in Apulia (35.3%). Orlando had his strongest results in his homeregion Liguria (34.5%), but also in Friuli-Venezia Giulia (28.5%), Sardinia (24.5%) and among Italians abroad (38.6%). Emiliano performed strongest in the Southern regions like his Apulia (54.4%) and the neighbouring Basilicata (24.4%) and Molise (22.6%).

Generally speaking, Renzi and Orlando did better in Northern and Central Italy, Emiliano in the South.

Region	Renzi	Orlando	Emiliano
Abruzzo	63.6	21.7	14.7
Aosta Valley	71.2	20.9	7.3
Apulia	35.3	10.3	54.4
Basilicata	62.3	13.3	24.4
Calabria	72.8	18.6	8.6
Campania	68.2	17.3	14.5
Emilia-Romagna	74.0	21.9	4.1
Friuli-Venezia Giulia	67.0	28.5	4.5
Lazio	70.3	22.6	7.1
Liguria	64.5	34.5	1.0
Lombardy	76.7	22.3	1.0
Marche	78.7	15.8	5.5
Molise	63.7	13.7	22.6
Piedmont	73.5	21.0	5.5
Sardinia	71.1	24.5	4.4
Sicily	61.2	23.0	15.8
South Tyrol	75.6	17.3	7.1
Trentino	73.0	21.4	5.6
Tuscany	79.1	17.0	3.9
Umbria	80.9	14.9	4.2
Veneto	73.2	21.0	5.8
World	58.2	38.6	3.2
