= Matteo Mauri =

Italian politician (born 1970)

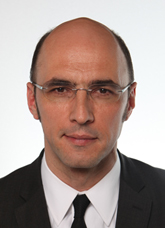

Democratic Party Coordinator
- In office 14 July 2018 – 17 November 2018

Personal details
- Born: 24 May 1970 (age 55) Milan, Italy
- Party: Democratic Party (Italy)

Matteo Mauri (born 24 May 1970 in Milan) is an Italian politician. He is the Deputy Minister of the Interior in the Conte II Cabinet. He was appointed Deputy Minister on 13 September 2019.

== Biography ==
=== Election as deputy ===
On November 24, 2009 he was appointed as National Chairman of Infrastructure and Transport of the Democratic Party in the National Secretariat of the New Secretary Pier Luigi Bersani. In the 2013 general elections he was elected deputy of the XVII legislature of the Italian Republic in the III Lombardia district for the Democratic Party. He succeeded Ettore Rosato and was appointed PD group leader in the Chamber as the new deputy group leader.

Mauri became one of the founders of the Sinistra è Cambiamento currently led by the Minister of Agricultural Policies Maurizio Martina, Cesare Damiano and Paola De Micheli who decided to vote for confidence in the Government on the Italicum by breaking with the PD minority of the Reformist Area against and having a position dialoguing with the Renzian majority.

In 2018 he was re-elected Deputy.
