= Ylenia Zambito =

Italian politician (born 1974)

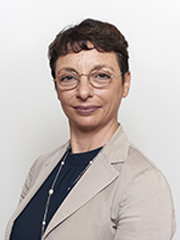
- Zambito in 2022

Member of the Senate
- Incumbent
- Assumed office 13 October 2022
- Constituency: Tuscany – P01

Personal details
- Born: 27 June 1974 (age 52)
- Party: Democratic Party (since 2007)

Ylenia Zambito (born 27 June 1974) is an Italian politician serving as a member of the Senate since 2022. From 2008 to 2018, she was an assessor of Pisa.

== Biography ==
She earned a bachelor’s degree in Pharmaceutical Chemistry and Technology in 1999 and went on to earn a Ph.D. in Chemistry and Technology of Bioactive Substances, which she completed in 2003. She then began working in the Department of Pharmacy at the University of Pisa, eventually becoming a full professor in 2017.

From 2008 to 2018, she served as councilor in charge of housing policy, public housing, and social housing on the Pisa City Council led by Marco Filippeschi .

In December 2012, she participated in the PD’s “parliamentary” primary elections, held to select candidates for Parliament in the upcoming general election, receiving 2,722 votes in Pis She was placed 30th on the PD’s list for the Chamber of Deputies (Italy) in the same district but was not elected.

In September 2018, he became a member of both the Assembly and the Regional Executive Committee of the PD in Tuscany, and in October 2021, he also became the official in charge of infrastructure and urban planning within the PD’s regional secretariat in Tuscany.

In the 2022 early general elections, she ran for the Senate of the Republic (Italy) on the Democratic Party–Democratic and Progressive Italy (PD-IDP) ticket in the Tuscany–01 multi-member district, in third place, and was elected to the Senate. During the 19th Legislature, she served as secretary of the 10th Committee on Social Affairs, Health, Public and Private Employment, and Social Security, and as a member of the parliamentary commissions of inquiry on working conditions in Italy, exploitation and workplace safety, illegal activities related to the waste cycle and other environmental and agri-food offenses, and the controversial commission on the SARS-CoV-2 epidemiological health emergency, in addition to serving as treasurer of the PD-IDP parliamentary group in the Senate.

In the 2023 PD primary elections, she supported the motion put forward by Elly Schlein, a member of Parliament and former vice president of the Emilia-Romagna Region, which won with 53.75% of the vote.
