= Stefano Vaccari =

Italian politician

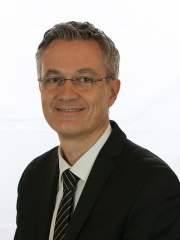

Mayor of Nonantola
- In office April 23, 1995 – June 12, 2004
- Preceded by: Valter Reggiani
- Succeeded by: Pier Paolo Borsari

Deputy of the Italian Republic
- Incumbent
- Assumed office October 13, 2022

Senator of the Italian Republic
- In office March 15, 2013 – March 22, 2018

Personal details
- Born: April 10, 1967 (age 59) Modena, Italy
- Party: PD (since 2007); PDS (until 1998); DS (1998–2007)

Stefano Vaccari (born April 10, 1967) is an Italian politician. He served as the mayor of Nonantola from 1995 to 2004, held the position of Provincial Councilor in the Province of Modena, and was a senator during the XVII legislature of the Italian Republic.

== Biography ==
Born on April 10, 1967, in Modena, Stefano Vaccari hails from Nonantola and currently resides in Spilamberto, in the province of Modena. He is married with two children. After completing his studies in computer science at the Fermo Corni Technical Industrial Institute and gaining initial experience in the field, he devoted himself to full-time politics. In the beginning, he focused on culture and youth engagement, even establishing youth clubs. Since 1988, he has been actively involved in advocating for the Saharawi people and has held the positions of President of the National Association of Solidarity with the Sahrawi People (ANSPS) and President of the Solidarity Association with the Sahrawi People "Kabara Lagdaf" in Modena.

=== Political career ===
After completing two terms as the Mayor of Nonantola, he was elected to the Provincial Council of Modena and subsequently appointed as an assessor in 2004. He was reconfirmed in this role in 2009 under the administration of Emilio Sabattini.

In 2012, Vaccari ran as a candidate in the Italian center-left primaries and emerged as one of the top three candidates of the Democratic Party in the Province of Modena, receiving 7,175 votes.

During the 2013 Italian general elections, he ran for and was elected to the Senate of the Republic on the Democratic Party's ticket in the Emilia-Romagna constituency. In the Senate, he served as the Secretary and later as the leader of the PD (Democratic Party) in the 13th Commission on Territory, Environment, and Environmental Assets. He was also a member of the Parliamentary Anti-Mafia Commission and chaired the 10th Committee on Mafia Infiltration in Legal and Illegal Gambling. This committee produced a conclusive report that was discussed and approved with a resolution in both houses of Parliament.

In the 2018 general elections, he ran for the Chamber of Deputies in the single-member constituency of Emilia-Romagna - 08 (Cento) as part of the center-left coalition affiliated with the Democratic Party. Although he received 28.12% of the votes, he was defeated by the candidate from the center-right, Emanuele Cestari, who secured 37.66% of the votes. Vaccari then took on the role of Communications Manager at Unieco Holding Ambiente while continuing his voluntary collaboration with the Democratic Party.

On June 15, 2019, Nicola Zingaretti, the Secretary of the Democratic Party, appointed him to the party's national secretariat, entrusting him with the responsibility of Democratic Party. He later became a member of the party's national board.

In the early parliamentary elections held on September 25, 2022, he ran for the Chamber of Deputies on the Democratic Party – Democratic and Progressive list. Placing second in the multi-member constituency of Emilia-Romagna - 02, he was elected to the Chamber of Deputies.
