= Youth Left (Italy) =

Former Italian political party

Left Youth Sinistra Giovanile
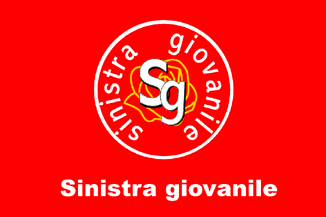
- Founded: 22 December 1990
- Dissolved: 14 October 2007
- Merged into: Young Democrats
- Ideology: Democratic socialism Social democracy
- Mother party: Democratic Party of the Left (1991–1998); Democrats of the Left (1998–2007)
- International affiliation: International Union of Socialist Youth

The Youth Left (Italian: Sinistra Giovanile, or SG) was the youth wing of the Democratic Party of the Left from 1991 to 1998 and the Democrats of the Left from 1998 until 2007, when the Democratic Party was founded and the SG joined the Young Democrats.

== National secretaries of the SG ==
- Gianni Cuperlo (1990–1992)
- Nicola Zingaretti (1992–1995)
- Giulio Calvisi (1995–1997)
- Vinicio Peluffo (1997–2001)
- Stefano Fancelli (2001–2007)
- Fausto Raciti (2007)
