= Anthony Barbagallo =

Italian politician (born 1975)

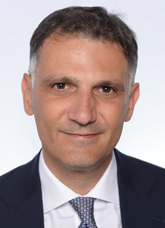
- Barbagallo in 2022

Member of the Chamber of Deputies
- Incumbent
- Assumed office 13 October 2022
- Constituency: Sicily 2 – 03

Personal details
- Born: 24 December 1975 (age 50)
- Party: Democratic Party (since 2010)

Anthony Emanuele Barbagallo (born 24 December 1975) is an Italian politician serving as a member of the Chamber of Deputies since 2022. He has served as secretary of the Democratic Party in Sicily since 2025. From 2012 to 2023, he was a member of the Sicilian Regional Assembly. From 2005 to 2015, he served as mayor of Pedara.
