= Irene Tinagli =

Italian economist and politician (born 1974)

Irene Tinagli MEP
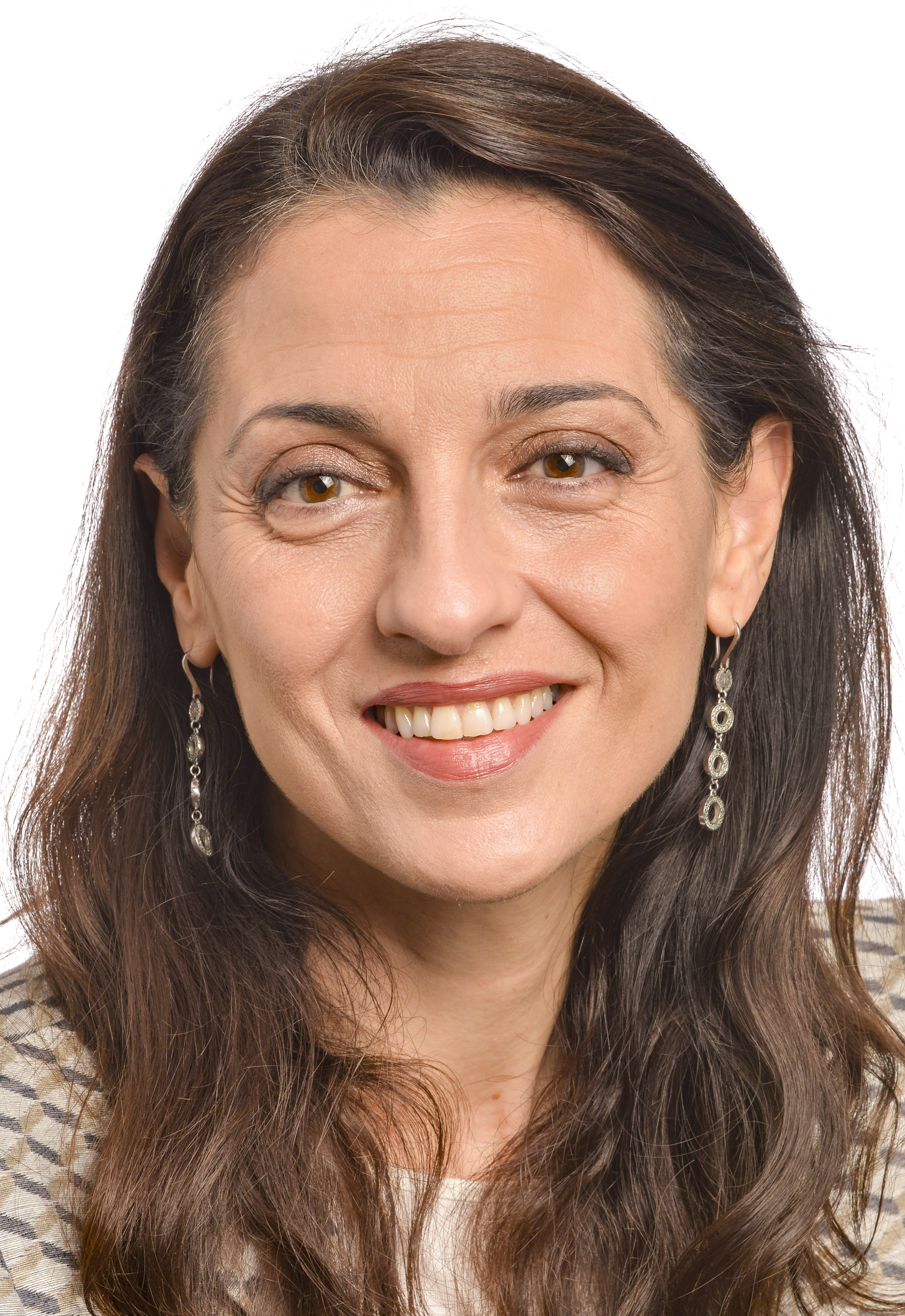

Deputy secretary of the Democratic Party
- In office 17 March 2021 – 12 March 2023 Serving with Peppe Provenzano
- Secretary: Enrico Letta
- Preceded by: Andrea Orlando
- Succeeded by: Vacant

Member of the European Parliament
- Incumbent
- Assumed office 2 July 2019
- Constituency: North-West Italy

Member of the Chamber of Deputies
- In office 15 March 2013 – 22 March 2018
- Constituency: Emilia-Romagna

Personal details
- Born: 16 April 1974 (age 52) Empoli, Italy
- Party: National Party: PD (2008–2013; since 2015) EP Group: S&D (since 2019)
- Other political affiliations: SC (2013–2015)
- Education: Bocconi University (Degree); Carnegie Mellon University (PhD)
- Profession: Politician, economist
- Website: irenetinagli.it

Irene Tinagli (born 16 April 1974) is an Italian politician and economist. She has served as a Member of the European Parliament (MEP) since 2019. During the Ninth European Parliament (2019-2024), she was chair of the European Parliament Committee on Economic and Monetary Affairs.

== Early life and education ==
Tinagli was born in Empoli. She earned a Master's degree in Public Policy from Carnegie Mellon University in 2002 with the support of a Fulbright grant.

== Career ==
Tinagli worked as a consultant for the United Nations Department of Economic and Social Affairs, where she was one of the contributors to the book Understanding Knowledge Societies, published in 2005 by the United Nations.

In 2009, Tinagli began teaching Management and Organizations at Charles III University of Madrid.

=== Member of the Italian Parliament, 2013–2018 ===
Tinagli was elected to the Italian Parliament in 2013 as a member of Civic Choice. In February 2015, she joined the parliamentary group of the Democratic Party. On 17 March 2021, she was appointed deputy secretary of the Democratic Party by the party's national secretary, Enrico Letta.

=== Member of the European Parliament, 2019–present ===
In the 2019 European election, Tinagli was elected as an MEP with 106,710 running as a candidate for the Democratic Party. She was subsequently elected as chair of the Committee on Economic and Monetary Affairs on 5 September 2019, succeeding Roberto Gualtieri after his appointment as finance minister.

== Board positions ==
- Friends of Europe, Member of the Board of Trustees (since 2020)
- Florence School of Banking and Finance, Advisory Council
- Center for Social Norms and Behavioral Dynamics at the University of Pennsylvania, Advisory Board

== Recognition ==
The World Economic Forum recognized Tinagli in 2010 as a Young Global Leader, citing her professional contributions and societal impact. In 2024, she received a "Rising Star" award at The Parliament Magazine's annual MEP Awards.

== Publications ==
- Europe in the Creative Age (con R. Florida), Demos, London, 2004.
- Sweden in the Creative Age (con R. Florida, P. Strom, E. Whalqvist), University of Gothenburg, School of Economics, Business and Law, 2007
- Talento da svendere, Turin, Einaudi, 2008.
- L'Italia è un Paese bloccato. Muoviamoci! La mobilità sociale secondo Italia Futura, Rome, Italia Futura, 2009.
- Giovani, al lavoro! Le proposte di Italia Futura per l'occupazione giovanile, with Stefano Micelli and Marco Simoni, Rome, Italia Futura, 2010.
- Norway in the Creative Age. Research Report, Staten vegvesen & Abelia, Oslo, 2012
- Un futuro a colori. Scoprire nuove opportunità di lavoro e vivere felici, Rizzoli editore, 2014.
- La grande ignoranza. Dall'uomo qualunque al ministro qualunque, l'ascesa dell'incompetenza e il declino dell'Italia. Rizzoli editore, 2019.
