= List of secretaries of the Democratic Party (Italy) =

The secretary of the Democratic Party is the leader of the Democratic Party, the main centre-left political party in Italy.

== Secretaries ==
N°	Portrait	Name (Born–Died)	Term of office		Primary election
1		Walter Veltroni (1955– )	14 October 2007	21 February 2009	2007
2		Dario Franceschini (1958– )	21 February 2009	7 November 2009	None
3		Pier Luigi Bersani (1951– )	7 November 2009	20 April 2013	2009
Vacant			20 April 2013	11 May 2013	
4		Guglielmo Epifani (1950–2021)	11 May 2013	15 December 2013	None
5		Matteo Renzi (1975– )	15 December 2013	19 February 2017	2013
Vacant			19 February 2017	7 May 2017	
(5)		Matteo Renzi (1975– )	7 May 2017	12 March 2018	2017
Vacant			12 March 2018	7 July 2018	
6		Maurizio Martina (1978– )	7 July 2018	17 November 2018	None
Vacant			17 November 2018	17 March 2019	
7		Nicola Zingaretti (1965– )	17 March 2019	14 March 2021	2019
8		Enrico Letta (1966– )	14 March 2021	12 March 2023	None
9		Elly Schlein (1985– )	12 March 2023	Incumbent	2023

=== Secretary tenure ===
Rank	Secretary	Total time in office	Terms
1	Matteo Renzi	4 years, 10 days	2
2	Elly Schlein	3 years, 165 days	1
3	Pier Luigi Bersani	3 years, 164 days	1
4	Enrico Letta	1 year, 363 days	1
5	Nicola Zingaretti	1 year, 362 days	1
6	Walter Veltroni	1 year, 130 days	1
7	Dario Franceschini	259 days	1
8	Guglielmo Epifani	218 days	1
9	Maurizio Martina	133 days	1

== Deputy secretaries ==
N°	Portrait	Name (Born–Died)	Term of office		Secretary
1		Dario Franceschini (1958– )	14 October 2007	21 February 2009	Veltroni
Vacant			21 February 2009	7 November 2009	Franceschini
2		Enrico Letta (1966– )	7 November 2009	20 April 2013	Bersani
Vacant			20 April 2013	28 March 2014	Epifani
3		Lorenzo Guerini (1966– )	28 March 2014	7 May 2017	Renzi
3		Debora Serracchiani (1970– )	28 March 2014	7 May 2017	Renzi
4		Maurizio Martina (1978– )	7 May 2017	12 March 2018	Renzi
Vacant			12 March 2018	17 April 2019	Martina
5		Paola De Micheli (1973– )	17 April 2019	5 September 2019	Zingaretti
5		Andrea Orlando (1969– )	17 April 2019	17 March 2021	Zingaretti
6		Peppe Provenzano (1982– )	17 March 2021	12 March 2023	Letta
6		Irene Tinagli (1974– )	17 March 2021	12 March 2023	Letta
Vacant			12 March 2023	Ongoing	Schlein

=== Deputy secretary tenure ===
Rank	Secretary	Total time in office	Secretary
1	Enrico Letta	3 years, 164 days	Pier Luigi Bersani
2	Lorenzo Guerini; Debora Serracchiani	3 years, 40 days	Matteo Renzi (1st term)
3	Peppe Provenzano; Irene Tinagli	1 year, 360 days	Enrico Letta
4	Andrea Orlando	1 year, 334 days	Nicola Zingaretti
5	Dario Franceschini	1 year, 130 days	Walter Veltroni
6	Maurizio Martina	309 days	Matteo Renzi (2nd term)
7	Paola De Micheli	141 days	Nicola Zingaretti
