= Corrado Clini =

Italian politician (born 1947)

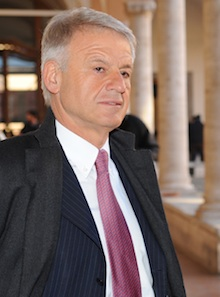
Corrado Clini

Corrado Clini (born 17 July 1947) is an Italian politician who served as the Italian minister of environment, land and sea (IMELS) in the Monti cabinet from November 2011 to April 2013.

== Early life and education ==
Clini was born in 1947. He received a bachelor of science degree in medicine from the University of Parma in 1972. He holds a PhD in occupational health from Padua University in 1975 and another PhD in hygiene and public health from Ancona University in 1986.

== Career ==
Clini was the director of the department of environmental protection and industrial medicine in Venice-Porto Marghera in the 1980s. He became the director general of the Italian environment ministry in the 1990s. He chaired the Italian expert-level delegation at the Rio conference on environment and development in 1992, and the Kyoto conference on climate change in 1997. From 2000 to 2001 he served as co-chairman of the G8 task force on renewable energy. He was also co-chairman of the European environmental and health committee of the United Nations economic commission for Europe. In 2006, Clini was named as chairman of the global bioenergy partnership. He also served as the director general of the Italian ministry of environment, land and sea. On 16 November 2011, Clini was appointed minister of environment, land and the sea. His tenure ended in April 2013 and Andrea Orlando replaced him in the post.

Clini also worked as a visiting professor at the Department for Environmental Sciences and Engineering of Tshingua University (Beijing).

Political offices
Preceded by Stefania Prestigiacomo	Italian Minister of the Environment; 2011–2013	Succeeded by Andrea Orlando
