= Marco Furfaro =

Italian politician (born 1980)

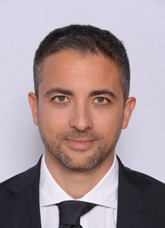
- Furfaro in 2022

Member of the Chamber of Deputies
- Incumbent
- Assumed office 13 October 2022
- Constituency: Tuscany – P01

Personal details
- Born: 19 June 1980 (age 45)
- Party: Democratic Party (since 2019)

Marco Furfaro (born 19 June 1980) is an Italian politician serving as a member of the Chamber of Deputies since 2022. He has been a member of the national secretariat of the Democratic Party since 2023.
