= Elly Schlein =

Italian politician (born 1985)

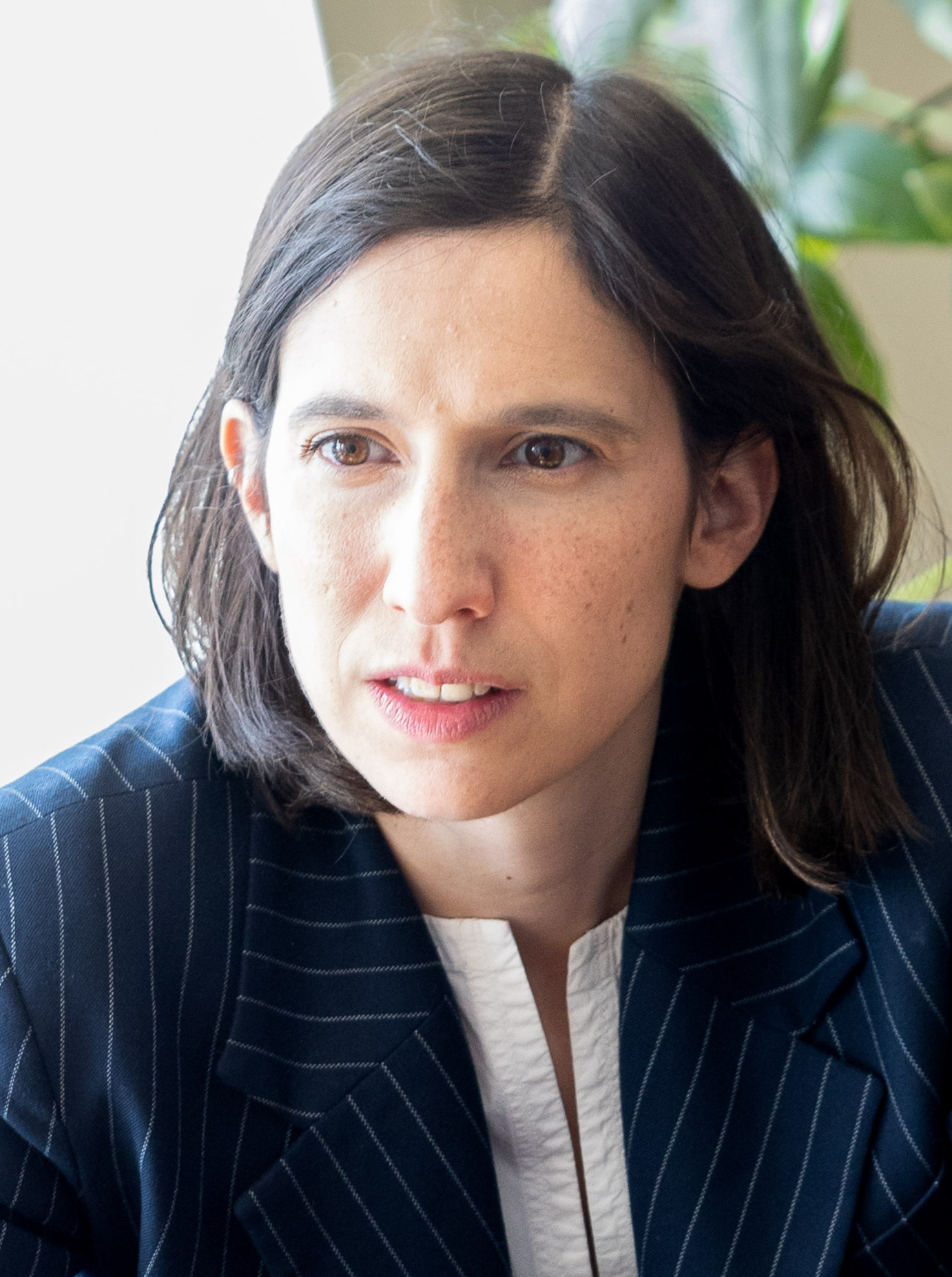
- Schlein in 2023

Secretary of the Democratic Party
- Incumbent
- Assumed office 12 March 2023
- Preceded by: Enrico Letta

Member of the Chamber of Deputies
- Incumbent
- Assumed office 13 October 2022
- Constituency: Emilia-Romagna – 02

Vice-President of Emilia-Romagna
- In office 28 February 2020 – 24 October 2022
- President: Stefano Bonaccini
- Preceded by: Raffaele Donini
- Succeeded by: Irene Priolo

Member of the European Parliament
- In office 1 July 2014 – 2 July 2019
- Constituency: North-East Italy

Personal details
- Born: Elena Ethel Schlein; 4 May 1985 (age 41) Lugano, Ticino, Switzerland
- Citizenship: Italy; Switzerland; United States
- Party: PD (2013–2015; since 2022)
- Other political affiliations: Possibile (2015–2019); Coraggiosa (2019–2020); Green Italia (2020–2022)
- Domestic partner: Paola Belloni
- Education: University of Bologna

Elena Ethel "Elly" Schlein (Italian: [ˈɛlli ˈʃlain]; born 4 May 1985) is an Italian politician who has been serving as the secretary of the Democratic Party (PD) since 12 March 2023. She is a member of Italy's Chamber of Deputies and was previously the vice president of Emilia-Romagna and a member of the European Parliament. On 26 February 2023, she was elected as the new PD secretary with 54% of the vote, becoming the first woman to lead the party.

== Early life and education ==
Elena Ethel Schlein was born on 4 May 1985 in Lugano, Switzerland. She has a sister, Susanna, who is a diplomat by profession and a brother, Benjamin, who is a mathematician. Her father, Melvin Schlein, is an American academic and political scientist of Ashkenazi Jewish descent. Originally, her paternal grandfather's surname was Schleyen; after arriving at Ellis Island, he changed it to Schlein. Her paternal ancestors were from Zhovkva, now located in Ukraine, and her paternal grandmother, from whom she takes the middle name Ethel, was of Lithuanian origin.

Schlein's Italian mother, Maria Paola Viviani, is a professor of comparative public law at the University of Insubria. Her maternal grandfather was the Italian Socialist Party politician Agostino Viviani, senator from 1972 to 1979 and a member of the High Council of the Judiciary. Later in life, Schlein moved to Bologna. She graduated from the University of Bologna in 2011 with a thesis on constitutional law. Schlein holds American, Italian and Swiss citizenships.

== Political career ==
=== Early beginnings, 2008–2013 ===
In 2008 and 2012, Schlein volunteered on Barack Obama's two presidential campaigns in the United States. In 2011, she was one of the founders of the association of university students known as Progrè, an association that dealt with deepening and sensitising public opinion on issues related to migration policies and the prison reality.

In April 2013, Romano Prodi, former Prime Minister of Italy and president of the Democratic Party (PD), received in support 100 votes less than expected from the centre-left coalition and withdrew from the 2013 Italian presidential election. In response, Schlein gave life to the mobilisation campaign known as #OccupyPD, which criticised those behind Prodi's loss and opposed the formation of a grand coalition government, the Letta Cabinet. In the 2013 PD leadership election on 8 December, Schlein gave her support to Giuseppe Civati, who ranked third.

=== Member of the European Parliament, 2014–2019 ===
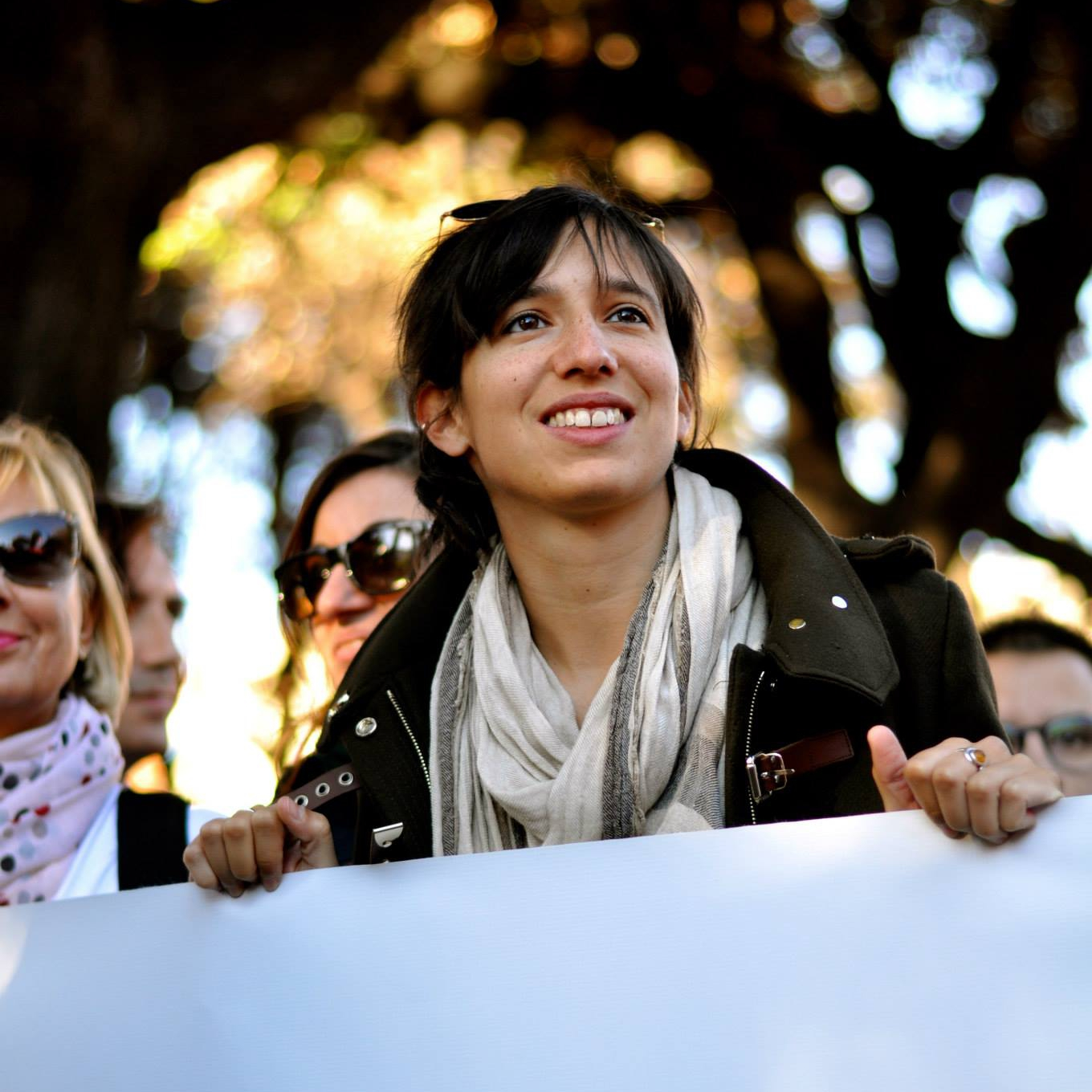
Schlein at the demonstration against the Jobs Act on 25 October 2014 in Rome

In February 2014, Schlein ran with the PD for a seat at the European Parliament in the North-Eastern constituency. In the 2014 European Parliament election in Italy, she was elected to the European Parliament. She served on the European Parliament Committee on Development. In addition to her committee assignments, she was part of the parliament's delegation to the European Union–Albania Stabilisation and Association Parliamentary Committee.

In May 2015, Schlein announced through a post on Facebook that she was leaving the PD, being in deep disagreement with the new political line of the party imposed by the party secretary and Italy's prime minister Matteo Renzi, and joined Possible, the party founded by Civati. In April 2019, Schlein announced her intention not to run in the 2019 European Parliament election in Italy.

=== Vice-president of Emilia-Romagna, 2020–2022 ===
In the 2020 Emilia-Romagna regional election on 26 January, Schlein ran as a candidate for member of the regional council of Emilia-Romagna as part of a left-wing electoral alliance called Emilia-Romagna Courageous Ecologist and Progressive. She was elected with over 22,000 votes, the highest vote tally for a councillor in regional history, and was subsequently appointed by Stefano Bonaccini as his vice-president. In February 2020, the PD's secretary Nicola Zingaretti offered Schlein the party presidency spot left vacant by Paolo Gentiloni.

=== 2022 general election and Democratic Party leadership run ===
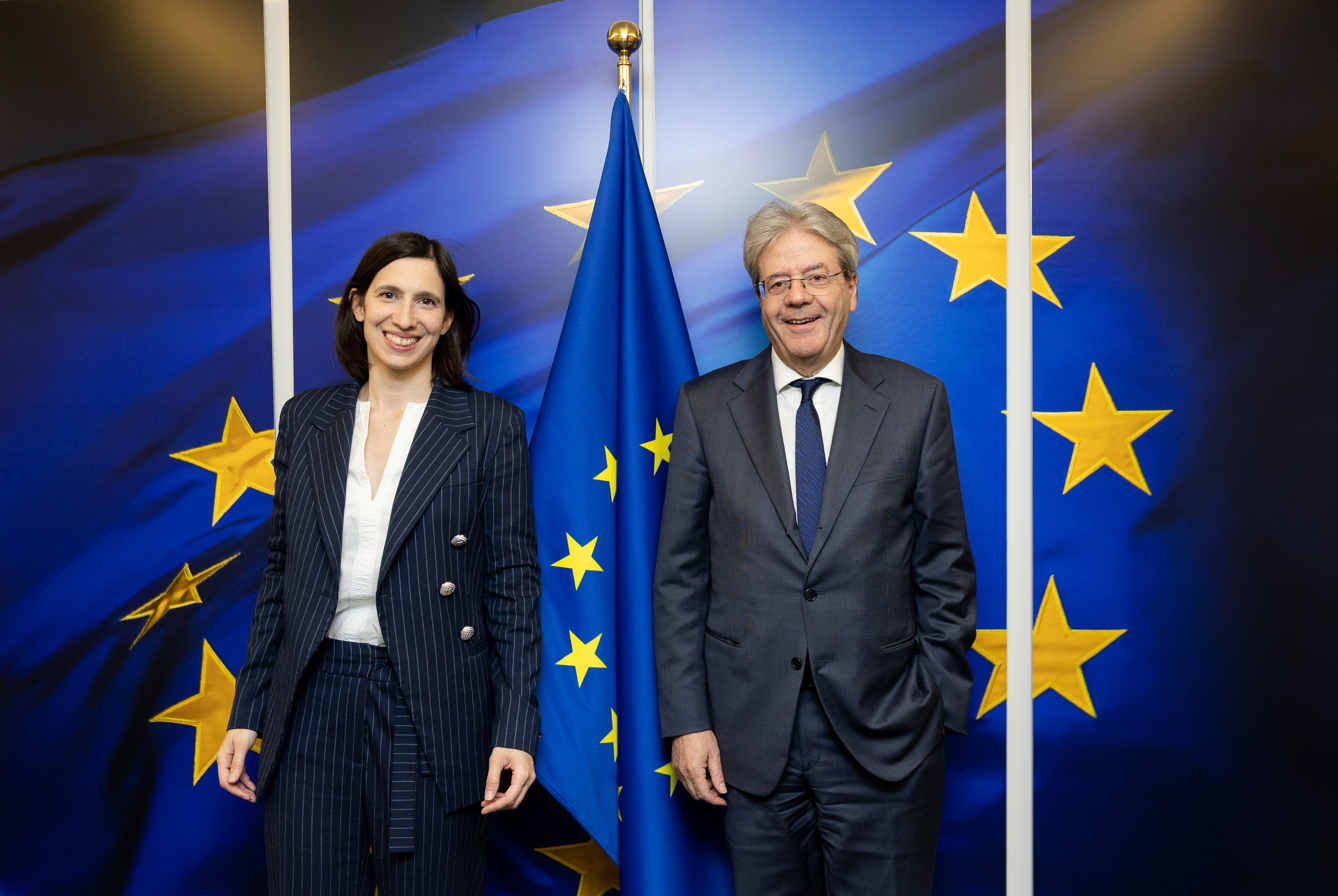
Schlein and Paolo Gentiloni on 23 March 2023

In the general election held on 26 September 2022, Schlein was elected to the country's Chamber of Deputies. A few weeks later, following Letta's resignation as leader of the PD, Schlein announced her run for the 2023 PD leadership election. In an upset, for the first time in the party's leadership elections, Schlein overcame the second place of the closed primary, by winning the open primary on 26 February 2023, when she was successfully elected ahead of Stefano Bonaccini.

In doing so, Schlein became the PD's first female, as well as the youngest person, to be elected leader of the PD since the formation of the party in 2007. She is also the first publicly-declared LGBTQ secretary of the Italian centre-left leading party. During her rise in the party, she has been compared to American congresswoman Alexandria Ocasio-Cortez. She succeeded Letta on 12 March 2023. On 18 April 2023, Schlein expressed her personal opinion in favour of surrogacy.

=== 2024 European Parliament Elections ===
In the 2024 European Parliament election in Italy, the PD received 24.1% of the votes, second to FdI.

=== Foreign policy ===
==== Israel ====
Schlein, who is of Jewish descent, has taken a critical position against the state of Israel, supporting the pro-Palestinian movement, as well as the two-state solution. During the 12-Day War, she strongly condemned Israel's attacks on Iran. In September 2025, Schlein gave her support to the Global Sumud Flotilla, along with other left-wing Italian leaders such as Angelo Bonelli and Nicola Fratoianni, and urged the Italian government to impose sanctions against Israel. Furthermore, dissatisfied with the Italian government's positions on the Israeli–Palestinian conflict, Schlein urged Italian municipalities to apply sanctions and carry out boycotts against Israel and members of the Israeli government. Schlein has repeatedly called the Israeli government led by Netanyahu criminal, and continued to pressure the Italian government to recognize the state of Palestine as soon as possible.

==== Iran ====
In January 2025, Schlein expressed support for Narges Mohammadi, the 2023 Nobel Peace Prize laureate, in a remote meeting. Schlein also pledged her support for the Iranian people's struggle against the Islamic regime. Schlein condemned Israel for attacking Iran. During the 2025–2026 Iranian protests, Schlein expressed support for the Iranian protesters fighting for the abolition of Iranian theocracy.

==== Venezuela ====
Schlein condemned the use of military force in Venezuela by the United States during the 2026 United States intervention in Venezuela; in particular, she expressed strong condemnation for the violation of international law. Previously, Schlein had expressed her support for the Italians detained without cause in Venezuelan prisons.

==== Ukraine ====
Schlein supports Ukraine in the Russo-Ukrainian war, including through the contribution of weapons and financial aid sent by Europe.

==== European Union ====
Schlein supports the federalization of the European Union and opposes the right of veto held by member states.

== Political positions ==
=== Domestic policy ===
Schlein supports the introduction of a minimum wage, a reduction of working hours while maintaining the same salary, and opposes the misuse of fixed-term employment contracts; she also advocates for lowering taxes on businesses and earned income, while raising taxes on financial and real estate income, as well as increasing inheritance taxes and realizing a cadastre reform.

On social issues, she's considered a feminist and supports LGBT+ rights, advocating for an anti-discrimination law, same-sex marriage and adoption, and surrogacy. She's also in favor of legalization of soft drugs, euthanasia, and a reduction in the time required for foreign residents in Italy to apply for Italian citizenship, from 10 to 5 years.

== Personal life ==
In February 2020, Schlein came out as bisexual. Her partner is Cagliari-born Paola Belloni. Schlein describes herself as a feminist and a progressive. In December 2022, arsonists destroyed a car used by her sister, diplomat Susanna Schlein serving in Athens, prompting Italy's incumbent prime minister Giorgia Meloni to express her "profound concern".

Party political offices
| Preceded by Enrico Letta | Secretary of the Democratic Party; 2023–present | Incumbent |
