= Fausto Raciti =

Italian politician (born 1984)

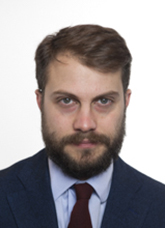
- Raciti in 2018

Member of the Chamber of Deputies
- In office 15 March 2013 – 12 October 2022
- Constituency: Sicily 2 (2013–2018); Sicily 2 – 03 (2018–2022)

Personal details
- Born: 8 March 1984 (age 42)
- Party: DS (until 2007); PD (since 2007)

Fausto Raciti (born 8 March 1984) is an Italian politician. From 2013 to 2022, he was a member of the Chamber of Deputies. From 2008 to 2014, he served as secretary of the Young Democrats. In 2007, he served as secretary of the Youth Left.
