= Maurizio Martina =

Italian politician (born 1978)

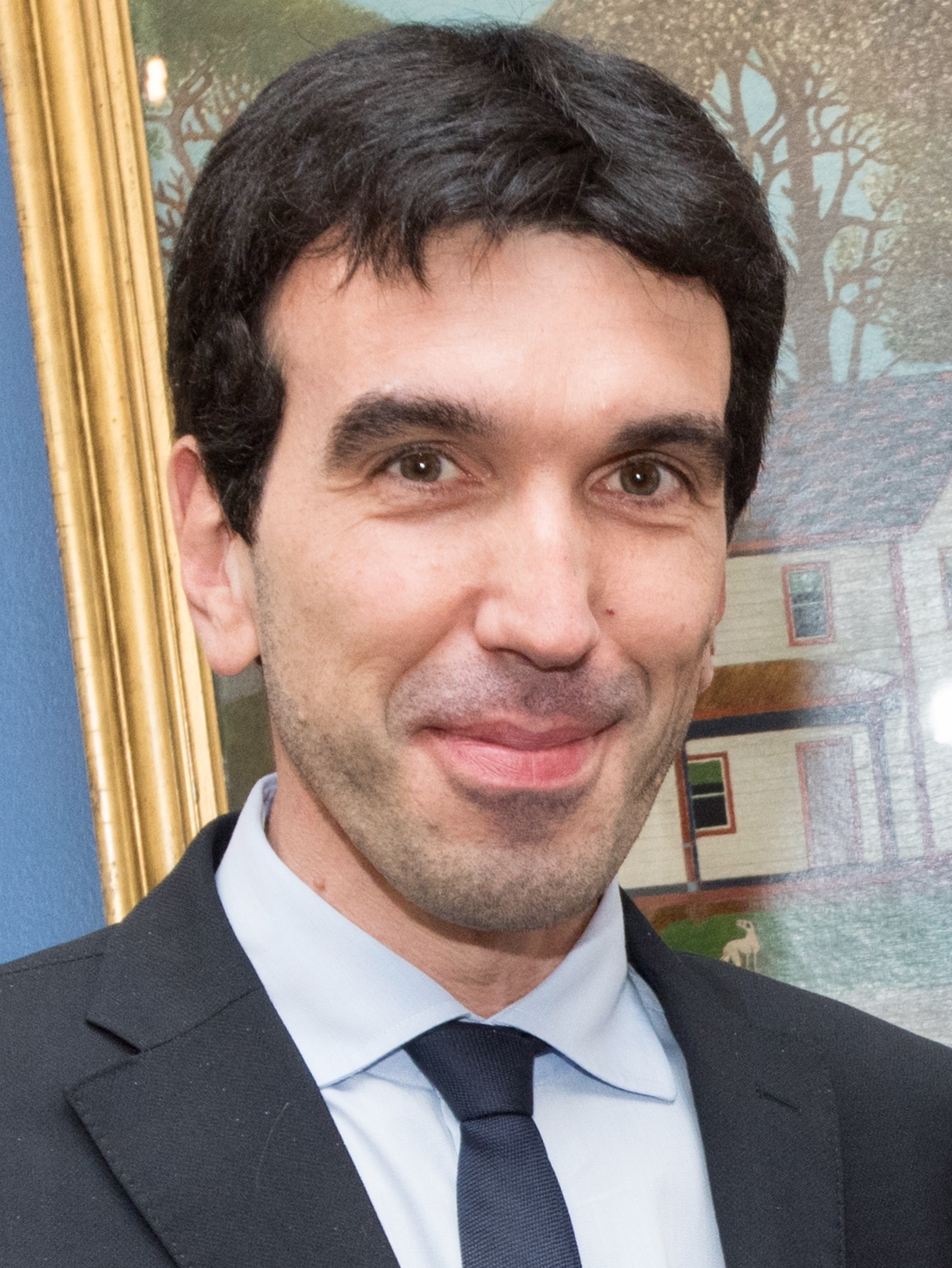

Secretary of the Democratic Party
- In office 7 July 2018 – 17 November 2018; Acting: 12 March 2018 – 7 July 2018
- Preceded by: Matteo Renzi
- Succeeded by: Nicola Zingaretti

Deputy Secretary of the Democratic Party
- In office 7 May 2017 – 12 March 2018
- Leader: Matteo Renzi
- Preceded by: Lorenzo Guerini; Debora Serracchiani
- Succeeded by: Andrea Orlando; Paola De Micheli

Minister of Agriculture
- In office 22 February 2014 – 13 March 2018
- Prime Minister: Matteo Renzi; Paolo Gentiloni
- Preceded by: Enrico Letta
- Succeeded by: Paolo Gentiloni (Acting)

Member of the Chamber of Deputies
- In office 23 March 2018 – 12 January 2021
- Constituency: Lombardy

Personal details
- Born: 9 September 1978 (age 48) Calcinate, Italy
- Party: DS (1998–2007); PD (since 2007)
- Spouse: Mara
- Children: 2
- Education: University of Macerata

Maurizio Martina (born 9 September 1978) is an Italian politician, Deputy Director-General of the Food and Agriculture Organization. Former member of the Chamber of Deputies of Italy from 2018 to 2021, Martina served as secretary of the Democratic Party (PD) from March to November 2018, being appointed after the 2018 Italian general election. He served as Minister of Agricultural, Food and Forestry Policies from 22 February 2014 to 13 March 2018, in the governments of Matteo Renzi and Paolo Gentiloni. On 7 May 2017, he was elected Deputy Secretary of the Democratic Party. Martina resigned as Agriculture Minister and took over as acting secretary of the PD after Matteo Renzi resigned following a poor election showing in 2018.

== Biography ==
Martina was born in Calcinate, near Bergamo, in 1978. He grew up in a middle-class working family, he attended the Agricultural Institute and later he graduated in political science at the University of Macerata.

In 1994, he joined the Students' Movement, a left-wing organization, and in 1999 he was elected to the city council of Mornico al Serio for the Democrats of the Left (DS). In the early 2000s he became a leading member of the Youth Left, the youth wing of the DS.

In 2007, he joined the new-founded Democratic Party and in 2009 he was appointed Responsible for Agriculture in the new secretariat led by Pier Luigi Bersani.

In 2013, he was appointed undersecretary to the Ministry of Agricultural, Food and Forestry Policies, in the government of Enrico Letta.

=== Minister of Agriculture ===
On 22 February 2014, when the new secretary of the PD, Matteo Renzi, forced Letta to resign, becoming the new prime minister, he appointed Martina Minister of Agriculture.

In 2015, Martina founded Left is Change, a left-wing social-democratic faction within the PD, allied with the centrist ones led by Matteo Renzi and Dario Franceschini.

During his tenure as Minister of Agriculture, various measures have been developed and approved in favor of youth employment in agriculture, bureaucratic simplification for businesses, generational turnover and internationalization of enterprises. Furthermore, during his mandate, the Common Agricultural Policy (CAP), which has been in force since 1 January 2015, has been definitively approved.

During his ministry, Milan hosted the Universal Exposition; the themes were technology, innovation, culture and traditions concerning food. Participants to the Expo include 145 countries, three international organisations, several civil society organisations, several corporations and non-governmental organisations (NGOs). The participants are hosted inside individual or grouped pavilions.

Martina proposed a law against the so-called caporalato, that is the exploitation of unreported employment in agriculture, which had been a serious and widespread problem especially in Southern Italy.

On 12 December 2016, when Renzi resigned as prime minister after the constitutional referendum, Martina was confirmed as Agriculture Minister by the new prime minister Paolo Gentiloni.

In February 2017, the incumbent secretary Renzi announced an electoral ticket with Martina for the Democratic leadership election in April; Martina would become Deputy Secretary and would probably lead the party if Renzi becomes prime minister again. Renzi won by a landslide and Martina was appointed new Deputy Secretary on 7 May.

=== Secretary of the Democratic Party ===
In the 2018 Italian general election, the centre-left coalition arrived third behind the centre-right alliance, in which Matteo Salvini's League was the main political force, and the Five Star Movement of Luigi Di Maio finished second. On 5 March, Renzi announced that the PD will be in opposition during this legislature and he will resign as secretary when a new cabinet will be formed. Renzi officially resigned on 12 March during PD's national directorate, and his deputy secretary Martina was appointed acting leader.

On 23 April 2018, after Elisabetta Casellati, President of the Senate, failed to form a cabinet combining the M5S and the centre-right, President Sergio Mattarella gave an exploratory mandate to the President of the Chamber of Deputies, Roberto Fico, to try to create a political agreement between the Five Star Movement and the Democratic Party.

Martina expressed his positive views, declaring that a government with the M5S could be possible. On 30 April, in an interview to Fabio Fazio, the former PD's leader Renzi expressed his strong opposition to an alliance with the M5S, and after few days the national direction of the party voted against the alliance.

On 7 July, he was elected Secretary by the party's assembly, with the aim of bringing the PD toward new leadership election in early 2019, before the European election.

On 3 March 2019, Martina lost the party leadership election against Nicola Zingaretti, receiving 22% of votes against Zingaretti's 66% and Roberto Giachetti's 12%.

=== Work at the Food and Agriculture Organization ===
On 12 January 2021, Martina resigned as member of the Chamber of Deputies to become Deputy Director-General of the Food and Agriculture Organization.

Party political offices
Preceded by Matteo Renzi	Secretary of the Democratic Party; 2018	Succeeded by Nicola Zingaretti
