= Minister of the Environment (Italy) =

Ministry in the Cabinet of Italy

Minister of the Environment and Energy Security
- Ministro dell'Ambiente e della Sicurezza Energetica
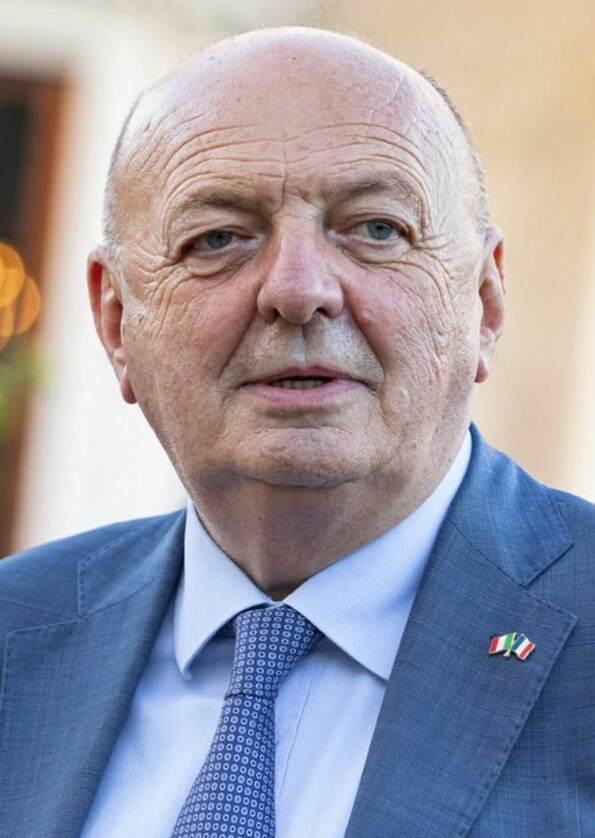
- Incumbent; Gilberto Pichetto Fratin since 22 October 2022
- Ministry for Ecological Transition
- Member of: Council of Ministers
- Seat: Rome
- Appointer: President of Italy
- Term length: No fixed term
- Formation: 4 August 1983; 43 years ago
- First holder: Alfredo Biondi
- Website: www.mite.gov.it

This is a list of ministers of the environment, a senior member of the Italian government who leads the Ministry of the Ecological Transition. The list shows also the ministers that served under the same office but with other names, in fact this Ministry has changed name many times: the current title is Minister of the Environment and Energy Security.

The current office holder is Gilberto Pichetto Fratin, a member of Forza Italia, who is serving in the government of Giorgia Meloni since 22 October 2022.

== List of ministers ==
Parties

- 1983–1994:
  - Italian Liberal Party
  - Italian Socialist Party
  - Federation of the Greens
  - Independent
- 1994–present:
  - National Alliance
  - Federation of the Greens
  - The Democrats
  - The People of Freedom / Forza Italia
  - Democratic Party
  - Union of the Centre / Centrists for Europe
  - Independent

Coalitions

- 1983–1994:
  - Centrist coalition
  - Organic centre-left
  - Pentapartito / Quadripartito
  - Mixed coalition
- 1994–present:
  - Centre-right coalition
  - Centre-left coalition
  - Mixed coalition

Portrait	Name (Born–Died)	Term of office			Party	Government	Ref.
Portrait	Name (Born–Died)	Took office	Left office	Time in office	Party	Government	Ref.
Minister of Ecology
	Alfredo Biondi (1928–2020)	4 August 1983	30 July 1984	361 days	Italian Liberal Party	Craxi I	
	Valerio Zanone (1936–2016)	30 July 1984	1 August 1986	2 years, 2 days	Italian Liberal Party	Craxi I	
Minister of the Environment
	Francesco De Lorenzo (1938– )	1 August 1986	18 April 1987	260 days	Italian Liberal Party	Craxi II	
	Mario Pavan (1918–2003)	18 April 1987	29 July 1987	102 days	Independent	Fanfani VI	
	Giorgio Ruffolo (1926–2023)	29 July 1987	28 June 1992	4 years, 335 days	Italian Socialist Party	Goria; De Mita; Andreotti VI·VII	
	Carlo Ripa di Meana (1929–2018)	28 June 1992	9 March 1993	254 days	Italian Socialist Party	Amato I	
	Valdo Spini (1946– )	9 March 1993	28 April 1993	1 year, 50 days	Italian Socialist Party	Amato I	
	Francesco Rutelli (1954– )	28 April 1993	4 May 1993	6 days	Federation of the Greens	Ciampi	
	Valdo Spini (1946– )	4 May 1993	10 May 1994	1 year, 6 days	Italian Socialist Party	Ciampi	
	Altero Matteoli (1940–2017)	10 May 1994	17 January 1995	252 days	National Alliance	Berlusconi I	
	Paolo Baratta (1939– )	17 January 1995	17 May 1996	1 year, 121 days	Independent	Dini	
	Edo Ronchi (1950– )	17 May 1996	25 April 2000	3 years, 347 days	Federation of the Greens	Prodi I D'Alema I·II	
	Willer Bordon (1949–2015)	25 April 2000	11 June 2001	1 year, 47 days	The Democrats	Amato II	
Minister of Environment and Land Protection
	Altero Matteoli (1940–2017)	11 June 2001	17 May 2006	4 years, 340 days	National Alliance	Berlusconi II·III	
Minister of Environment and Protection of Land and Sea
	Alfonso Pecoraro Scanio (1959– )	17 May 2006	8 May 2008	1 year, 357 days	Federation of the Greens	Prodi II	
	Stefania Prestigiacomo (1966– )	8 May 2008	16 November 2011	3 years, 192 days	The People of Freedom	Berlusconi IV	
	Corrado Clini (1947– )	16 November 2011	28 April 2013	1 year, 163 days	Independent	Monti	
	Andrea Orlando (1969– )	28 April 2013	22 February 2014	300 days	Democratic Party	Letta	
	Gian Luca Galletti (1961– )	22 February 2014	1 June 2018	4 years, 99 days	Union of the Centre / Centrists for Europe	Renzi; Gentiloni	
	Sergio Costa (1959– )	1 June 2018	13 February 2021	2 years, 257 days	Independent	Conte I·II	
Minister for Ecological Transition
	Roberto Cingolani (1961– )	13 February 2021	22 October 2022	1 year, 251 days	Independent	Draghi	
Minister of Environment and Energy Security
	Gilberto Pichetto Fratin (1954– )	22 October 2022	Incumbent	3 years, 340 days	Forza Italia	Meloni	
