= Andrea Rossi (politician) =

Italian politician (born 1976)

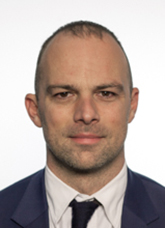
- Rossi in 2018

Member of the Chamber of Deputies
- Incumbent
- Assumed office 23 March 2018
- Constituency: Emilia-Romagna – 02 (2018–2022); Emilia-Romagna – 01 (2022–present)

Personal details
- Born: 9 October 1976 (age 49)
- Party: Democratic Party

Andrea Rossi (born 9 October 1976) is an Italian politician serving as a member of the Chamber of Deputies since 2018. From 2004 to 2014, he served as mayor of Casalgrande.
