= Iacopo Melio =

Italian politician, journalist and author

Iacopo Melio OMRI
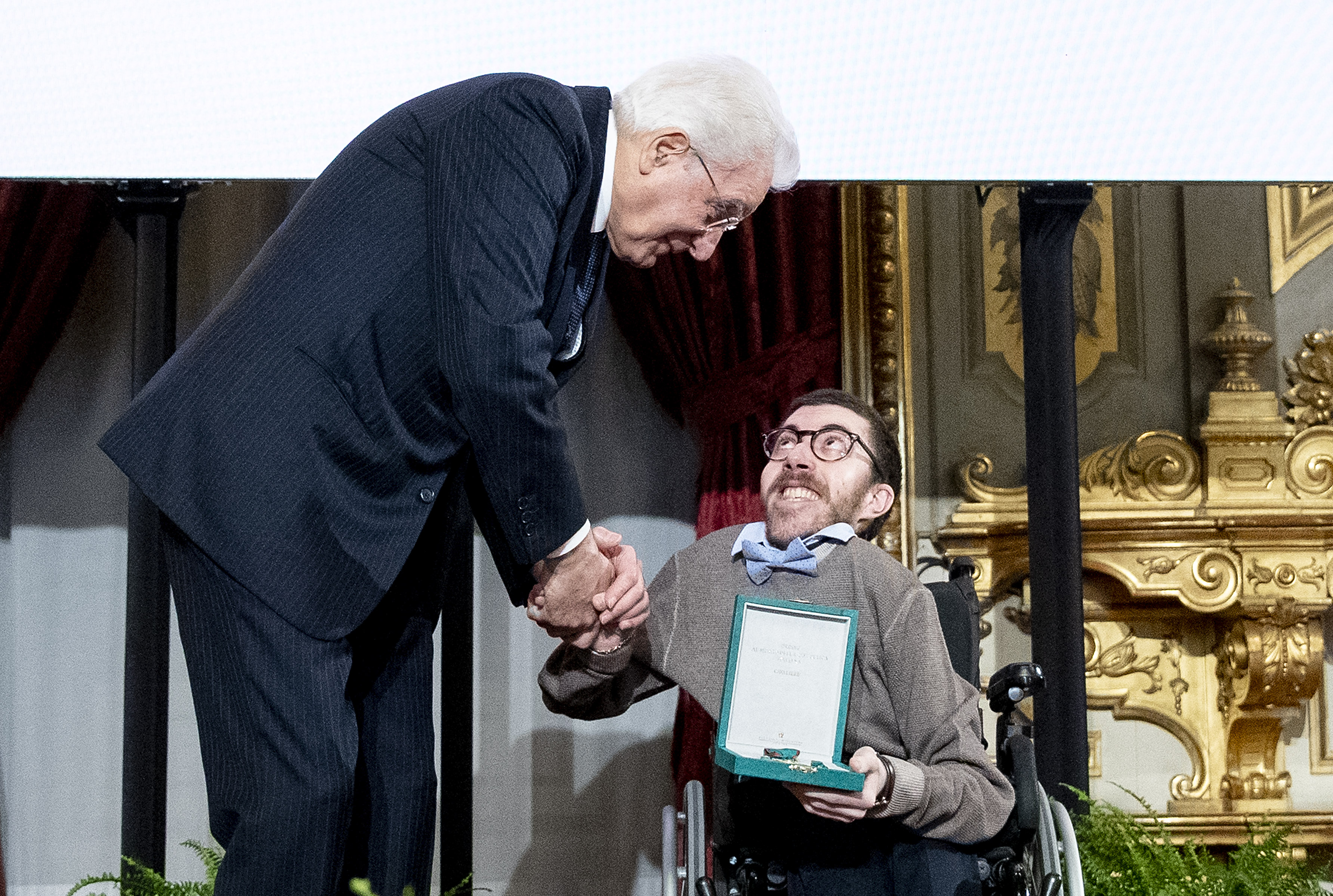
- President Sergio Mattarella (left) presents Melio (right) with the Order of Merit in 2018.

Member of the Regional Council of Tuscany
- Incumbent
- Assumed office 8 October 2020

Personal details
- Born: 28 April 1992 (age 34) San Miniato, Italy
- Party: Democratic Party
- Education: University of Florence
- Occupation: Politician; journalist; author; human and civil rights activist
- Known for: Human and civil rights activism

Iacopo Melio OMRI (born 28 April 1992) is an Italian politician, journalist, author and human and civil rights activist. In 2017, Melio was named a "European Citizen" by the European Parliament. In 2018, he was awarded Order of Merit of the Italian Republic.

== Life ==
The son of Claudio, a factory worker, and Barbara, a teacher, Iacopo Melio was born with Escobar syndrome, a rare genetic syndrome for which there is no research for prevention or cure, and uses a wheelchair to get around; he has often joked about his condition, saying for example that he was born "with four wheels to get around because he was born comfortable." He has a younger sister, Costanza, born in 2007.

=== Activism ===
He graduated from high school in 2011, then he graduated in political science from the University of Florence in 2020. In 2014, he created an online awareness campaign using the hashtag #Vorreiprendereiltreno, which was internationally successful and involved the singer Lorenzo Baglioni, who sang with Melio the song "Canto anch'io (No, tu no!)", a cover of Enzo Jannacci's song "Vengo anch'io. No, tu no"; the following year he founded an ONLUS of the same name, of which he was president until 2020.

=== Journalism ===
In 2016 he started collaborating with the online newspaper Fanpage.it, in 2019 he started further collaborations with The Post Internazionale and La Repubblica, and in 2021 with Vanity Fair Italia and Next Quotidiano. In the same period of time he has published four books: Parigi XXI, an autobiographical novel in prose and poetry; Faccio salti altissimi, an autobiography; Buonisti, a semi-serious essay on intolerance and hatred, especially online; Tutti i fiori che sei, a collection of stories dedicated to his sister. He has also taken part in two TEDx conferences, in 2017 and 2019.

=== Political activity ===
On 21 July 2020 he announced his candidacy for the 2020 regional elections in Tuscany in the ranks of the Democratic Party, of which he was the leader in the constituency Florence 1, where on 20–21 September of the same year, with 11,233 votes, the highest number of preferences, he was elected regional councillor. He was re-elected in 2025.

== Honours and awards ==
Knight of the Order of Merit of the Italian Republic – ribbon for ordinary uniform

Knight of the Order of Merit of the Italian Republic
"For his passionate contribution to the cause of breaking down architectural barriers and cultural stereotypes."
— Rome, 29 December 2018

- "European Citizen" award

«For translating the values of solidarity and international cooperation into practice.»
— European Parliament, 22 September 2017

- CILD civil liberties award – Best young Italian activist – Coalizione Italiana Libertà e Diritti Civili, 4 December 2018
- Tuscan communicator of the year

«For having distinguished himself in communicating and disseminating a theme, a message of social relevance, a positive image of the Tuscany Region.»
— Corecom, 7 dicembre 2018

- SuperAbile award – Communication section

«For the incisiveness, originality and constancy with which he carries on, with commitment and passion, the battle for the protection of the rights of people with disabilities.»
— INAIL, 3 December 2021

== Works ==
- Melio, Iacopo. Parigi XXI (in Italian). Turin: Miraggi. ISBN 978-88-99815-09-7.
- Melio, Iacopo (2018). Faccio salti altissimi: la mia storia oltre le barriere, tra ruote bucate e amori fuori tempo (in Italian). Milan: Mondadori. ISBN 978-88-04-68602-6.
- Melio, Iacopo (2019). Buonisti (in Italian). Gallarate: People. ISBN 978-88-32089-32-5.
- Melio, Iacopo (2021). Tutti i fiori che sei (in Italian). Milan: Rizzoli. ISBN 978-88-17-14921-1.
