= Peppe Provenzano =

Italian politician (born 1982)

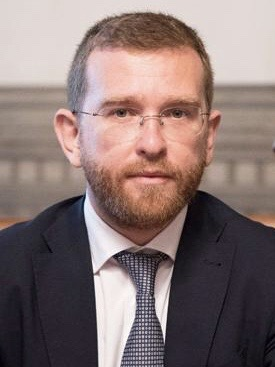
- Peppe Provenzano in September 2019

Minister for the South and Territorial Cohesion
- In office 5 September 2019 – 13 February 2021
- Prime Minister: Giuseppe Conte
- Preceded by: Barbara Lezzi
- Succeeded by: Mara Carfagna

Deputy Secretary of the Democratic Party
- In office 17 March 2021 – 12 March 2023 Serving with Irene Tinagli
- Leader: Enrico Letta
- Preceded by: Andrea Orlando

Member of the Chamber of Deputies
- Incumbent
- Assumed office 13 October 2022
- Constituency: Sicily 1

Personal details
- Born: Giuseppe Provenzano; 23 July 1982 (age 44) San Cataldo, Sicily, Italy
- Party: Democratic Party
- Education: Sant'Anna School
- Profession: Researcher

Giuseppe Luciano Calogero "Peppe" Provenzano (born 23 July 1982) is an Italian politician and member of the Democratic Party. On 5 September 2019, he was appointed Minister for the South in the government of Giuseppe Conte. Provenzano is a meridionalist.

== Biography ==
A native of Milena, Sicily, in the province of Caltanissetta, he earned his law degree from the University of Pisa, obtained a licentiate in legal sciences, and received his Ph.D. from the Sant’Anna School of Advanced Studies in 2012. In 2010, he became a researcher at the Svimez association, where he has served as deputy director since 2016. His work focuses on Southern Italy, particularly on cohesion and development policies for the region. A member of the editorial board of the Rivista economica del Mezzogiorno, he has written for various economic and legal journals and has regularly contributed to the political debate through articles in Le Ragioni del Socialismo, l’Unità, Il Riformista, HuffPost, and la Repubblica. His latest book is La sinistra e la scintilla. Idee per un riscatto (The Left and the Spark: Ideas for Redemption), published by Donzelli.
