= List of current presidents of regions of Italy =

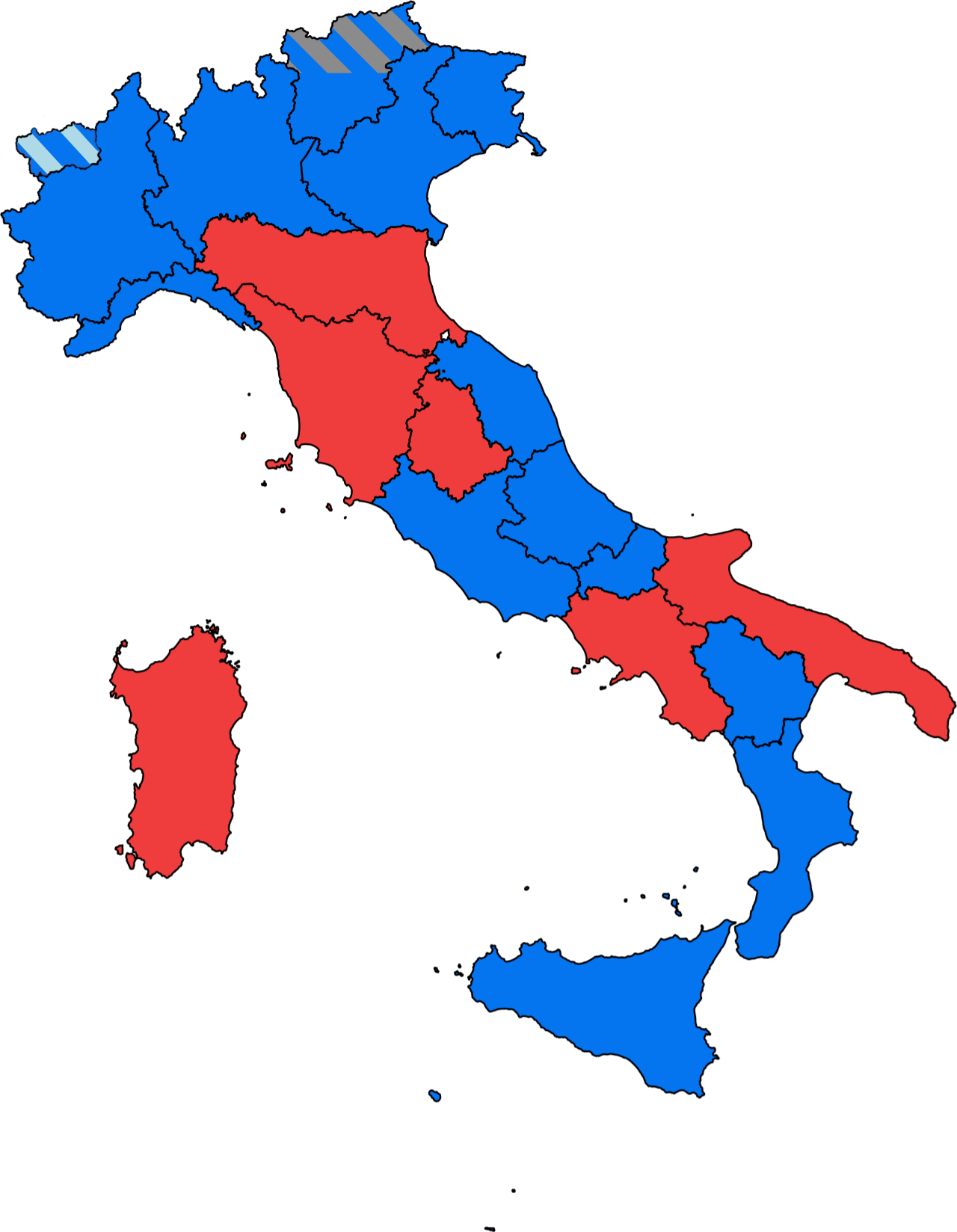
Regions colored by the winning coalition (as of December 2025)

This is the list of current presidents of regions of Italy.

== List ==
Region	Name	Portrait	Since	Term	Party	Coalition	Last election
Aosta Valley	Renzo Testolin (1968–)		2 March 2023 (Note: Renzo Testolin was president also in 2019–2020.)	2025–2030	UV	Centre-right	2025
Piedmont	Alberto Cirio (1972–)		6 June 2019	2024–2029	FI	Centre-right	2024
Liguria	Marco Bucci (1959–)		6 November 2024	2024–2029	Indep	Centre-right	2024
Lombardy	Attilio Fontana (1952–)		26 March 2018	2023–2028	Lega–LL	Centre-right	2023
Trentino-Alto Adige/Südtirol	Arno Kompatscher (1972–)		13 March 2024	2024–2026 (rotational presidency)	SVP	Centre-right	2023
Veneto	Alberto Stefani (1992–)		5 December 2020	2025–2030	Lega–LV	Centre-right	2025
Friuli-Venezia Giulia	Massimiliano Fedriga (1980–)		30 April 2018	2023–2028	Lega–LFVG	Centre-right	2023
Emilia-Romagna	Michele De Pascale (1985–)		13 December 2024	2024–2029	PD	Centre-left	2024
Tuscany	Eugenio Giani (1959–)		8 October 2020	2025–2030	PD	Centre-left	2025
Umbria	Stefania Proietti (1975–)		2 December 2024	2024–2029	Indep	Centre-left	2024
Marche	Francesco Acquaroli (1974–)		30 September 2020	2025–2030	FdI	Centre-right	2025
Lazio	Francesco Rocca (1965–)		2 March 2023	2023–2028	Indep–FdI	Centre-right	2023
Abruzzo	Marco Marsilio (1968–)		11 February 2019	2024–2029	FdI	Centre-right	2024
Molise	Francesco Roberti (1967–)		6 July 2023	2023–2028	FI	Centre-right	2023
Campania	Roberto Fico (1974–)		9 December 2025	2025–2030	M5S	Centre-left	2025
Apulia	Antonio Decaro (1970–)		7 January 2026	2025–2030	PD	Centre-left	2025
Basilicata	Vito Bardi (1951–)		25 March 2019	2024–2029	FI	Centre-right	2024
Calabria	Roberto Occhiuto (1969–)		29 October 2021	2025–2030	FI	Centre-right	2025
Sicily	Renato Schifani (1950–)		13 October 2022	2022–2027	FI	Centre-right	2022
Sardinia	Alessandra Todde (1969–)		20 March 2024	2024–2029	M5S	Centre-left	2024
