= Valentina Ghio =

Italian politician (born 1971)

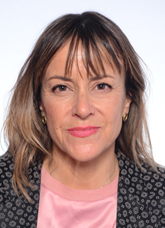
- Ghio in 2022

Member of the Chamber of Deputies
- Incumbent
- Assumed office 13 October 2022
- Constituency: Liguria – P01

Personal details
- Born: 5 May 1971 (age 55)
- Party: Democratic Party (since 2007)

Valentina Ghio (born 5 May 1971) is an Italian politician serving as a member of the Chamber of Deputies since 2022. From 2013 to 2022, she served as mayor of Sestri Levante.
