= Young Democrats (Italy) =

Youth of the Democratic Party

Young Democrats Giovani Democratici
- Chairperson: Virginia Libero
- Founded: 21 November 2008
- Membership: 35,000 (2016)
- Ideology: Social democracy
- Mother party: Democratic Party
- International affiliation: International Union of Socialist Youth
- European affiliation: Young European Socialists
- Website: giovani-democratici.eu

The Young Democrats (Italian: Giovani Democratici, GD) is the youth wing of the Democratic Party (PD) of Italy. The organisation is an affiliate of the Young European Socialists and International Union of Socialist Youth.

== History ==
The Young Democrats was officially founded on 21 November 2010, three years after the foundation of the Democratic Party.

In the first primary election, held in March 2010, Fausto Raciti was elected secretary of the GD, with 93,686 votes, 77% of the total.

On 20 July 2014, Raciti resigned, and Andrea Baldini was elected as new secretary of the organisation.

In the second primary election, held in March 2016, Mattia Zunino was elected secretary of the GD, with 20,561 votes, 83% of the total.

== Functions ==
The Young Democrats to involve young people in the Democratic Party and ensure that the aspirations of young people are reflected in Democratic policies in power. Young Democrats members are able to get involved in the PD through local policy events, campaigning or by attending events and social gatherings.

The GD holds a range of additional national events, including fringe sessions at the Democratic Party's annual conference.

== Secretaries ==
- Fausto Raciti (21 November 2008 – 20 July 2014)
- Andrea Baldini (20 July 2014 – 20 March 2016)
- Mattia Zunino (20 March 2016 – 1 July 2021)
- Caterina Cerroni and Raffale Marras (as Coordinators, 1 July 2021)
- Virginia Libero (9 November 2025 – present)
