= Paola De Micheli =

Italian politician (born 1973)

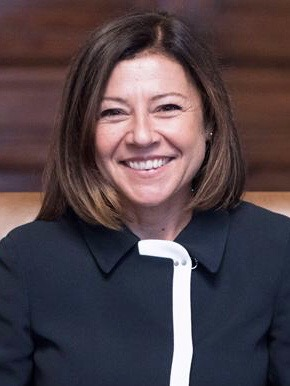
- Paola De Micheli in 2019.

Minister of Infrastructure and Transport
- In office 5 September 2019 – 13 February 2021
- Prime Minister: Giuseppe Conte
- Preceded by: Danilo Toninelli
- Succeeded by: Enrico Giovannini

Deputy Secretary of the Democratic Party
- In office 17 April 2019 – 5 September 2019 Serving with Andrea Orlando
- Leader: Nicola Zingaretti
- Preceded by: Maurizio Martina
- Succeeded by: Andrea Orlando

Member of the Chamber of Deputies
- Incumbent
- Assumed office 29 April 2008
- Constituency: Emilia-Romagna

Personal details
- Born: 1 September 1973 (age 53) Piacenza, Italy
- Party: DC (1989–1994); PPI (1994–2002); DL (2002–2007); PD (since 2007)
- Education: Università Cattolica del Sacro Cuore
- Occupation: Manager, politician

Paola De Micheli (Italian pronunciation: [ˈpaːola de miˈkɛːli]; born 1 September 1973) is an Italian manager and politician of the Democratic Party (PD), who served as Minister of Infrastructure and Transport in the government of Prime Minister Giuseppe Conte from 2019 until 2021; she was the first woman to hold the office.

== Early life and education ==
De Micheli graduated in political sciences at the Catholic University in Milan and worked as a manager in the agri-food industry.

== Political career ==
=== Early beginnings ===
Born in a Catholic family and herself Catholic, at 16 De Micheli joined Christian Democracy (DC). A centre-left Christian Democrat, she later joined the Italian People's Party (PPI) and Democracy is Freedom (DL). Her first elective role was as municipal councilor of Pontenure from 1999 to 2004. In 2007, along with DL, she joined the Democratic Party (PD). From 2007 to 2010 she was municipal minister for Human and Economic Resources in Piacenza.

In the 2008 Italian general election, De Micheli was elected to the Chamber of Deputies and during the 2009 PD leadership election, she supported Pier Luigi Bersani, later elected secretary, who appointed her as new party manager for small and medium-sized enterprises.

Once re-elected deputy at the 2013 Italian general election, De Micheli has been appointed Undersecretary of the Ministry of Economy in the Renzi Cabinet and the Gentiloni Cabinet, holding the seat from 2014 to 2017. In September 2017, De Micheli left her office at the Ministry of Economy to replace Vasco Errani as new Commissioner for the reconstruction of the areas hit by the 2016 and 2017 earthquakes.

De Micheli was re-elected for the third time to the Chamber of Deputies at the 2018 Italian general election. During the 2019 PD leadership election, she supported Nicola Zingaretti; once Zingaretti was elected Secretary, De Micheli's name came out as new possible Deputy Secretary of the PD.

=== Minister of Infrastructure and transport ===
On 5 September 2019, De Micheli was appointed Minister of Infrastructure and Transport, in the government of Giuseppe Conte, who led a coalition between Democrats and the Five Star Movement.
