= Andrea Orlando =

Italian politician (born 1969)

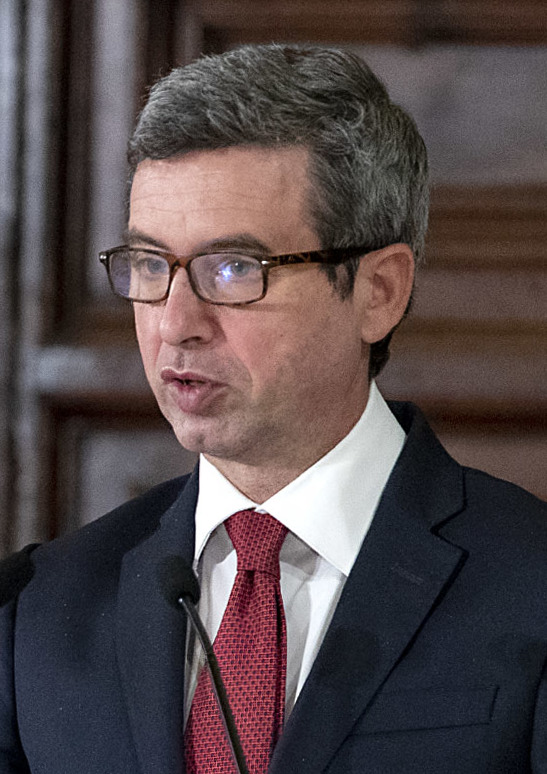
- Orlando in 2021

Minister of Labour and Social Policies
- In office 13 February 2021 – 22 October 2022
- Prime Minister: Mario Draghi
- Preceded by: Nunzia Catalfo
- Succeeded by: Marina Calderone

Minister of Justice
- In office 22 February 2014 – 1 June 2018
- Prime Minister: Matteo Renzi; Paolo Gentiloni
- Preceded by: Annamaria Cancellieri
- Succeeded by: Alfonso Bonafede

Minister of the Environment
- In office 28 April 2013 – 22 February 2014
- Prime Minister: Enrico Letta
- Preceded by: Corrado Clini
- Succeeded by: Gian Luca Galletti

Deputy Secretary of the Democratic Party
- In office 17 April 2019 – 17 March 2021
- Leader: Nicola Zingaretti
- Preceded by: Maurizio Martina
- Succeeded by: Peppe Provenzano; Irene Tinagli

Member of the Chamber of Deputies
- In office 28 April 2006 – 16 December 2024
- Succeeded by: Alberto Pandolfo
- Constituency: Liguria

Personal details
- Born: 8 February 1969 (age 57) La Spezia, Italy
- Party: PCI (before 1991); PDS (1991–1998); DS (1998–2007); PD (since 2007)

Andrea Orlando (born 8 February 1969) is an Italian politician who served as minister of labour and social policies from 2021 to 2022 in the cabinet led by Prime Minister Mario Draghi. From 2013 to 2014 he served as minister of the environment under Enrico Letta and as minister of justice under Matteo Renzi and Paolo Gentiloni from 2014 to 2018. He served as deputy secretary of the Democratic Party between 2019 and 2021.

Originally active within the Communist Party, Orlando became a founding member of the PD in 2007, and has since been regarded as a senior representative of its left wing. He was first elected to the Chamber of Deputies in 2006, where he has represented Liguria since.

== Early life ==
Orlando was born in La Spezia on 8 February 1969. His parents came from the Southern region of Campania. He is a high-school graduate with a major in scientific subjects. He attended the scientific lyceum, Antonio Pacinotti.

== Political career ==
=== Career in local politics ===
Orlando began his political career in Italian Communist Party. In 1989, he was elected provincial secretary of the Italian Communist Youth Federation (FGCI) for his hometown, and in 1990 he was elected to the city council of La Spezia with the party. In 1995 he became city secretary for the Democratic Party of the Left.

=== Career in national politics ===
In 2003, Orlando became deputy national coordinator of the Democrats of the Left.

Orlando first became a member of the Chamber of Deputies in the 2006 Italian general election, representing the Liguria constituency. He served in different parliamentary commissions.

Orlando became a founding member of the Democratic Party. In 2009, he was made the head of the justice forum of the PD, under the leadership of chairman Pier Luigi Bersani. He is known as one of the "Young Turks" in Italian politics.

=== Minister of the Environment (2013–2014) ===
On 23 April 2013, Orlando was appointed minister of the environment in the grand coalition government led by Prime Minister Enrico Letta. Orlando succeeded Corrado Clini in that post.

=== Minister of Justice (2014–2018) ===
On 13 February 2014, following tensions with his left-wing rival and new secretary of the Democratic Party, Matteo Renzi, Letta announced he would resign as prime minister the following day. On 22 February Renzi was sworn in as prime minister, and Orlando was appointed minister of justice. When Italy held the rotating presidency of the Council of the European Union in the second half of 2014, he chaired the Justice and Home Affairs Council.

On 12 December 2016, when Renzi resigned as prime minister after the constitutional referendum, Orlando was confirmed as justice minister by the new Prime Minister Paolo Gentiloni.

In February 2017, Orlando tried to win the leadership of the Democratic Party but eventually was defeated by incumbent party chairman Renzi.

By June 2017, after more than two years of debate, Italy's parliament approved a contested reform of the justice system proposed by Orlando and aimed at making it more difficult for criminals to avoid conviction.

=== Parliamentary career ===
In parliament, Orlando served on the committee on environment, territory and public works from 2018 until 2021.

In addition to his parliamentary work, Orlando was part of the Italian delegation to the Parliamentary Assembly of the Council of Europe from 2018 until 2021. In this capacity, he served on the committee on legal affairs and human rights (2018–2021) and the sub-committee on artificial intelligence and human rights (2019–2021). From 2020 until 2021, he was the Assembly's rapporteur on the rule of law in Poland and Moldova.

=== Minister of Labour (2021–2022) ===
In February 2021, in the midst of the COVID-19 pandemic in Italy, the former president of the European Central Bank Mario Draghi was invited by President Sergio Mattarella to form a government of national unity following the resignation of Prime Minister Giuseppe Conte. On 13 February, Orlando was appointed minister of labour and social policies.

When Italy held the rotating presidency of the G20 in 2021, Orlando chaired the meetings of the group's ministers of labour.

Political offices
Preceded by Corrado Clini	Minister of the Environment; 2013–2014	Succeeded by Gian Luca Galletti
Preceded by Annamaria Cancellieri	Minister of Justice; 2014–2018	Succeeded by Alfonso Bonafede
Preceded by Nunzia Catalfo	Minister of Labour and Social Policies; 2021–2022	Succeeded by Marina Calderone
Party political offices
Preceded by Maurizio Martina	Deputy Secretary of the Democratic Party; 2019–2021	Succeeded by Peppe Provenzano
Preceded by Maurizio Martina	Deputy Secretary of the Democratic Party; 2019–2021	Succeeded by Irene Tinagli
