= Gennaro Sangiuliano =

Italian journalist, writer, and politician (born 1962)

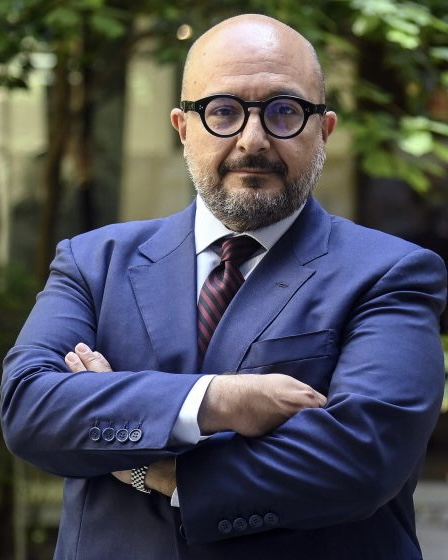
- Sangiuliano in 2022

Minister of Culture
- In office 22 October 2022 – 6 September 2024
- Prime Minister: Giorgia Meloni
- Preceded by: Dario Franceschini
- Succeeded by: Alessandro Giuli

Personal details
- Born: 2 June 1962 (age 64) Naples, Italy
- Party: MSI (1983–1995); Independent (1995–2025); FdI (2025–present)
- Spouse: Federica Corsini
- Education: University of Naples Federico II
- Profession: Journalist

Gennaro Sangiuliano (born 6 June 1962) is an Italian journalist, writer, and politician who served as Minister of Culture in the Meloni Cabinet. He was the director of the Roma newspaper in Naples from 1996 to 2001 and of TG2 from 2018 to 2022, as well as the deputy director of the Libero newspaper and of TG1 from 2009 to 2018.

== Early life and education ==
Born in Naples, Sangiuliano attended the city's liceo classico named after Adolfo Pansini. He then graduated in Law at the University of Naples Federico II. He later obtained a master's degree in European private law at Sapienza University of Rome and cum laude the research doctorate in Law and Economics at the University of Naples Federico II.

== Career ==
Sangiuliano works at Canale 8 in Naples, and entered the editorial office of Economy, a periodical considered by some to be close to Francesco De Lorenzo. Together with Ciro Paglia, historical editor-in-chief of the daily newspaper Il Mattino, he published the volume Il paradiso. Viaggio nel profondo nord, in response to the controversial L'Inferno by Giorgio Bocca, which garnered mixed reviews.

In the early 1990s, Sangiuliano worked at L'Indipendente and then at the political editorial staff of the Roma newspaper in Naples (a newspaper close to Giuseppe Tatarella), of which he became director from 1996 to 2001. He was then head of the Roman editorial office and then deputy editor of the Libero newspaper under the direction of Vittorio Feltri. He also wrote at that time for the weekly L'Espresso, and for the cultural pages of Il Sole 24 Ore. He started dealing with economics for the monthly North and South, the historic magazine founded by Francesco Compagna. He wrote for the Giornale di Napoli under the direction of Lino Jannuzzi, for Il Foglio by Giuliano Ferrara and for Il Giornale. In 2010, on the occasion of the death of the former head of state Francesco Cossiga, Sangiuliano published a detailed article in Il Giornale in which he recalls the endorsement of the then president Giorgio Napolitano.

Sangiuliano is an external lecturer in information law at LUMSA, and also in economics of financial intermediaries at the Sapienza University of Rome. In addition, since 2016, he has held the course of History of the economy and Libera Università Internazionale degli Studi Sociali Guido Carli, and since 2015 he has been the director of the Journalism school of the University of Salerno. He is the professor of the Master in Journalism and Communication of the Università degli Studi Pegaso.

== Minister of Culture ==
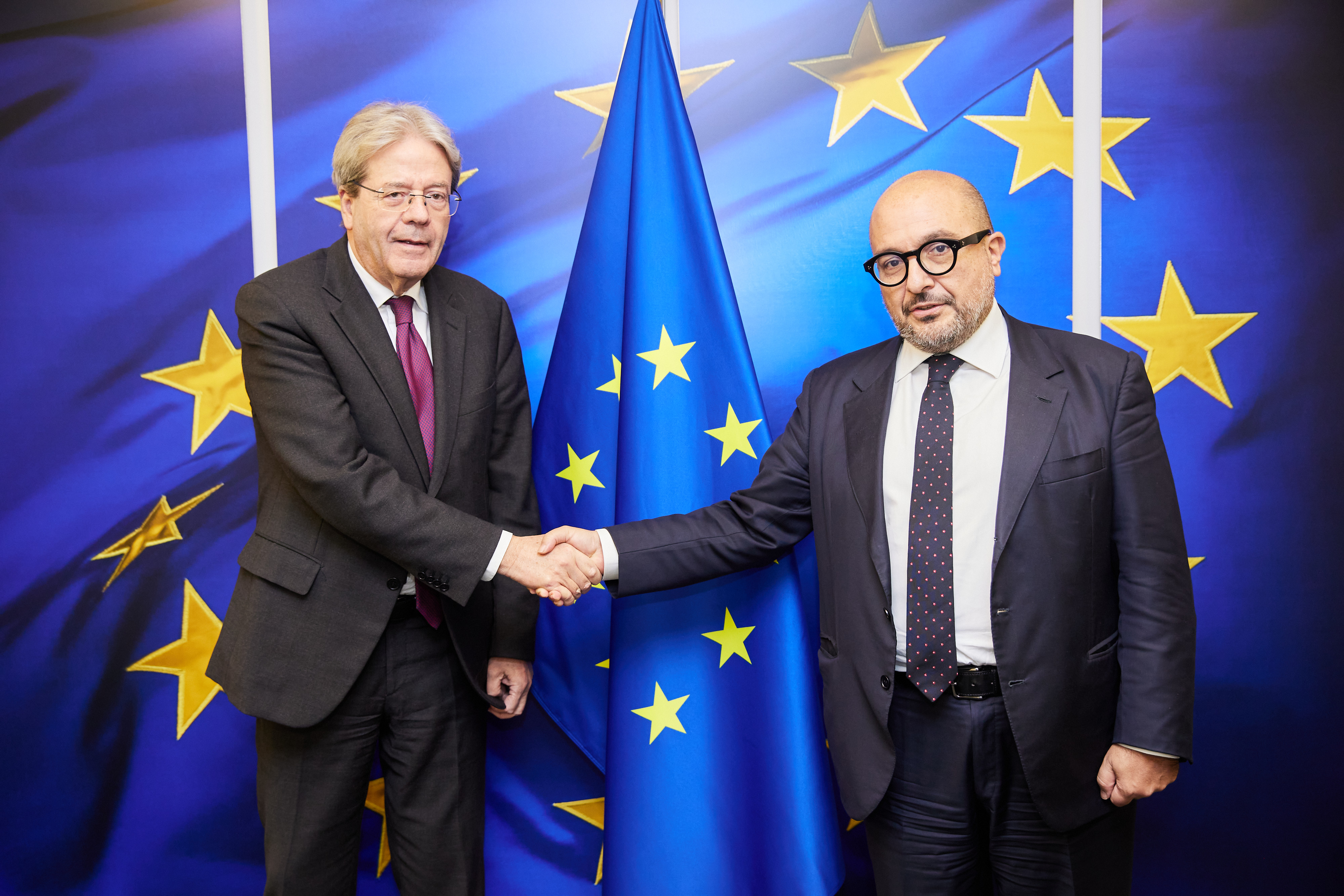
Sangiuliano with Paolo Gentiloni, the European Commissioner for Economy, in 2022

Following the 2022 Italian general election won by the right-wing coalition on 22 October, Giorgia Meloni, the leader of Brothers of Italy (FdI) party, was sworn in as Italy's first female prime minister. Sangiuliano was appointed minister of culture. He rose to nationwide prominence in July 2023 when it became apparent that, despite being part of the jury of the Premio Strega, he had not read the final entries in the competition.

In September 2024, a scandal broke when Maria Rosaria Boccia, a social media influencer, announced on Instagram that she had a new role as an advisor for major events to the Ministry of Culture, a claim the ministry itself denied. Boccia then published documents and pictures of herself on business and institutional trips with Sangiuliano, including visits she said were reconnaissance for the upcoming G7 ministerial meeting on culture in Positano. Moreover, during her time at the ministry, she had free access to secretated documents without permission. On 4 September, during an interview at the TG1, Sangiuliano was forced to admit an affair with Boccia, adding that he tried to hire her as a ministry consultant. Sangiuliano stated he offered his resignation to Meloni, who rejected it.

After two days, Sangiuliano announced his resignation on 6 September. Minutes prior to his resignation, Sangiuliano had made 18 nominations, which concerned a commission managing €50 million destined for Italian film production, including many FdI militants from Campania, such as Luciano Lanna (former director of Il Secolo d'Italia), Dario Renzullo (former CasaPound representative), Emanuele Merlino (head of the technical secretariat), and Luciano Schifone (former MEP of FdI's legal predecessor parties, the Italian Social Movement and National Alliance), as well as cultural figures close to the political right like Paolo Mereghetti, Valerio Caprara, Pier Luigi Manieri, Massimo Galimberti, Pasqualino Damiani, Valerio Toniolo, and Stefano Zecchi, who is described as "an intellectual co-opted by the right" who served as councilor in Milan and Venice. According to internal sources, the nominations by Sangiuliano, which for the first time also included a €15,000 fee and attracted controversy and surprised reactions among the technical ministers within the ministry itself, were a mix of expertise, friendships, and political affiliations, with the aim of rebalancing what Sangiuliano called "left-wing cultural hegemony".
