= Dario Franceschini =

Italian lawyer, writer, and politician (born 1958)

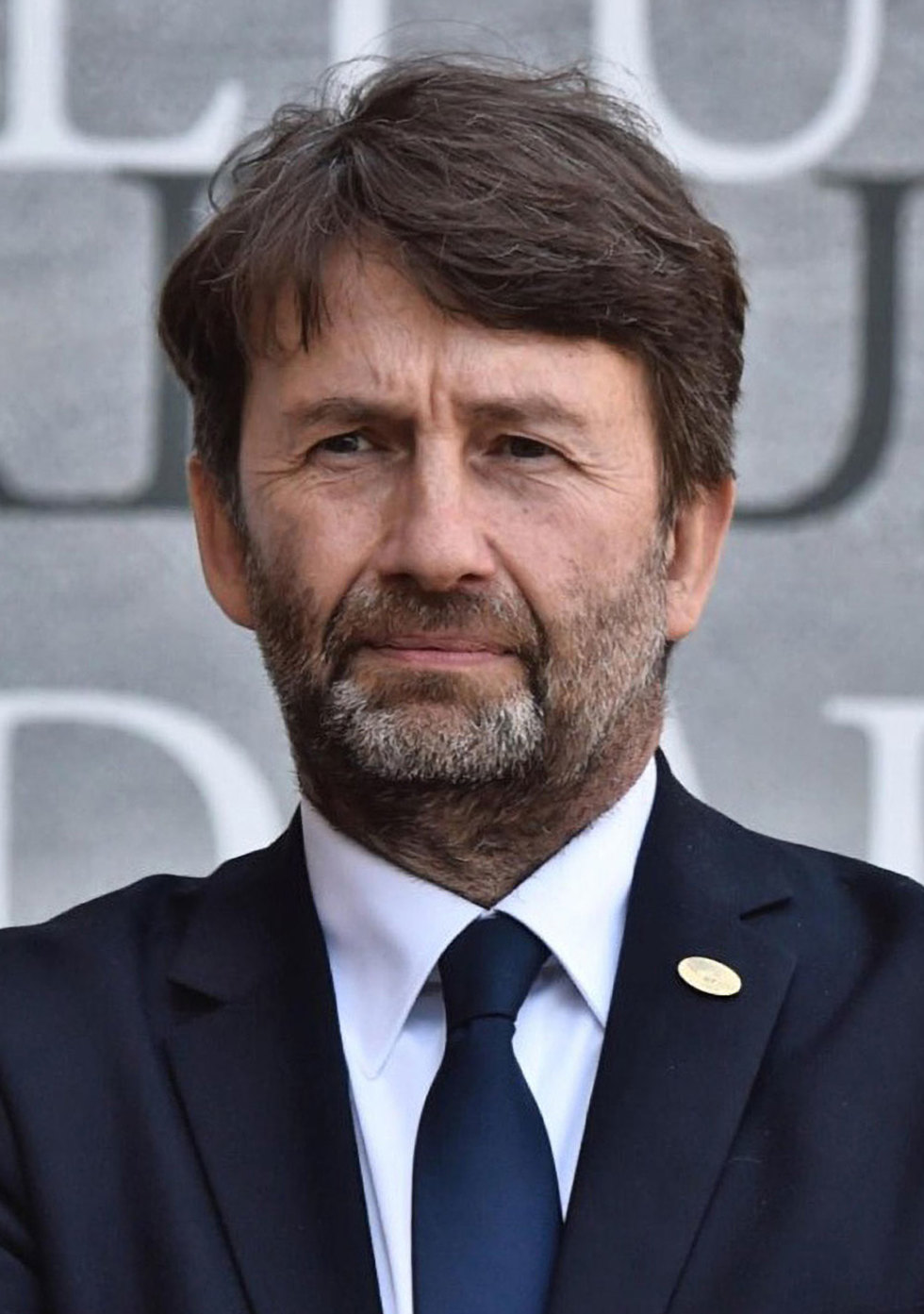

Minister of Culture
- In office 5 September 2019 – 22 October 2022 (Note: As Minister of Cultural Heritage and Tourism from 5 September 2019 to 13 February 2021.)
- Prime Minister: Giuseppe Conte; Mario Draghi
- Preceded by: Alberto Bonisoli
- Succeeded by: Gennaro Sangiuliano
- In office 22 February 2014 – 1 June 2018 (Note: As Minister of Cultural Heritage and Tourism.)
- Prime Minister: Matteo Renzi; Paolo Gentiloni
- Preceded by: Massimo Bray
- Succeeded by: Alberto Bonisoli

Minister of Parliamentary Relations
- In office 28 April 2013 – 22 February 2014
- Prime Minister: Enrico Letta
- Preceded by: Pietro Giarda
- Succeeded by: Maria Elena Boschi

Secretary of the Democratic Party
- In office 21 February 2009 – 7 November 2009
- Preceded by: Walter Veltroni
- Succeeded by: Pier Luigi Bersani

Member of the Senate of the Republic
- Incumbent
- Assumed office 13 October 2022
- Constituency: Campania

Member of the Chamber of Deputies
- In office 30 May 2001 – 12 October 2022
- Constituency: Emilia-Romagna

Personal details
- Born: 19 October 1958 (age 68) Ferrara, Italy
- Party: DC (before 1994); CS (1994–1995); PPI (1995–2002); DL (2002–2007); PD (since 2007)
- Other political affiliations: The Olive Tree (1995–2007)
- Spouses: Silvia Bombardi (m. 1986; div. 2011) Michela Di Biase (m. 2014)
- Children: 3 daughters
- Education: University of Ferrara

Dario Franceschini (Italian pronunciation: [ˈdaːrjo frantʃesˈkiːni]; born 19 October 1958) is an Italian lawyer, writer, and politician, member of the Democratic Party (PD), of which he briefly became leader in 2009. Franceschini served as Minister of Cultural Heritage and Activities and Tourism, a position that he held from February 2014 to June 2018 and again from September 2019 to October 2022, making him the longest-serving cultural heritage minister in the history of the Italian Republic. Franceschini also served as Minister for Parliamentary Relations from 2013 to 2014.

Franceschini was a prominent member of the Italian People's Party (PPI), of Democracy is Freedom – The Daisy (DL), and the first Deputy Secretary of the PD. Following the resignation of Walter Veltroni on 21 February 2009, the Constituent Assembly of the PD elected him the new secretary. On 25 October 2009, he lost the 2009 PD leadership election to Pier Luigi Bersani, and subsequently accepted his offer to become the party's leader in the Chamber of Deputies. Franceschini, who is considered a centrist and a Christian leftist, is the leader of AreaDem, which is the majority faction in the PD.

== Biography ==
Franceschini was born in Ferrara in 1958. His father, Giorgio, was a Catholic partisan and MP for the Christian Democrats in the Second Legislature, from 1953 to 1958. He graduated in law at the University of Ferrara. with a thesis on the history of doctrines and political institutions, published as a book Il Partito Popolare a Ferrara. Cattolici, socialisti e fascisti nella terra di Grosoli e Don Minzoni ("The Popular Party in Ferrara. Catholics, socialists and fascists in the land of Grosoli and Don Minzoni") and on the same subject, he participated in conferences and publications. In 1985, he graduated from the University of Ferrara and started practising civil law in the Court of Cassation. He was admitted to the auditors and has been an effective member of the supervisory board of Eni in its first three years of privatization. From 1985 to 1989 he edited for Formez the bimonthly review of regional legislative documentation.

He was president of the Palio di Ferrara. He is an honorary citizen of the City of Borgo Velino. On 8 March 2014, during a visit to Palmanova, he was hospitalized due to a heart attack while he was at the Ederle barracks. The official hospital bulletin reported later that the minister was suffering from an acute coronary syndrome, which was treated positively and promptly. He was then transferred to the Santa Maria della Misericordia hospital in Udine. He was released on 16 March 2014. He received the America Award of the Italy-USA Foundation in 2016.

Franceschini is divorced from his first wife, Silvia Bombardi. He married Michela Di Biase in 2014 in Sutri (VT). He has three daughters.

== Early political career ==
=== Democratic Student Association to the Christian Democrats ===
His political activity began at the student level, from Antonio Roiti High School in Ferrara in the fall of 1974 when he founded the Democratic Student Association, of Catholic and centrist inspiration. The ASD is present in almost all high schools in the city in the early elections scheduled by "decrees". From 1974 to 1977 he was elected to the various student organisations (class councils, disciplinary and institutional). Later, he was elected student representative to the board of directors of the University of Ferrara. He founded the Cultural Cooperative Christmas Gorini, which is concerned with art cinema.

The charismatic figures that since his youth aroused his attention are, among others, Benigno Zaccagnini and don Primo Mazzolari. In particular, Don Mazzolari is repeatedly pointed out to during his campaign to be the secretary of the Democratic Party. He dedicated one of the most significant parts in the final speech of his campaign, delivered in Marzabotto 24 October 2009

He enrolled in the Christian Democrats after the election of Benigno Zaccagnini and was elected provincial youth delegate. In 1980 he became councillor of Ferrara in 1983 and party whip of the council. The following year, he enters the national leadership of the DC youth movement, for which he founded and directed the magazine New Policy. In 1989 he directs in Rome the monthly "Seventy-six" gathering thirty years history of the left DC and is called to the vice-direction of the monthly Comparison (il Confronto) and in the preparation of the party's weekly La Discussione.

During the transformation of the Christian Democrats into the Italian Popular Party, he invites the party, at the Constituent Assembly in Rome in 1993, to choose, with determination, as a result of the new electoral system, an alliance between the center and the left. He does not accept the decision of the party to stand independently - as a coalition of center - in the general election of 1994, in the Pact for Italy. Therefore, decides to join the movement of the Social Christians, founding the movement in Ferrara and becoming National Director. In 1994 he creates in Ferrara one of the first juntas of the center-left in Italy, becoming Head of Culture and Tourism. In 1995, he is a candidate for Mayor of Ferrara (supported by the Greens, Labour and Social Christians) winning about 20% of the votes.

=== Italian People's Party ===
After the internal divisions in the PPI and the adhesion of the same Olive Tree, he is part of the party and, from 1997 to 1999, he is National Deputy. Subsequently, the National Congress of 1999, in which he is a candidate for national secretary but is defeated by Pierluigi Castagnetti, becomes part of the national leadership and the office of secretary with responsibility for the policies of the Communication. During the second D'Alema government, he is appointed Undersecretary to the Prime Minister with responsibility for institutional reforms, and reconfirmed by the next government Amato.

On behalf of the Government, he follows, in particular, the issue of the electoral law, and until the final approval, the constitutional law of reform of the statutes of the special regions, the introduction of voting rights for Italians abroad and the changes to Title V of the Constitution.

=== The Olive Tree ===
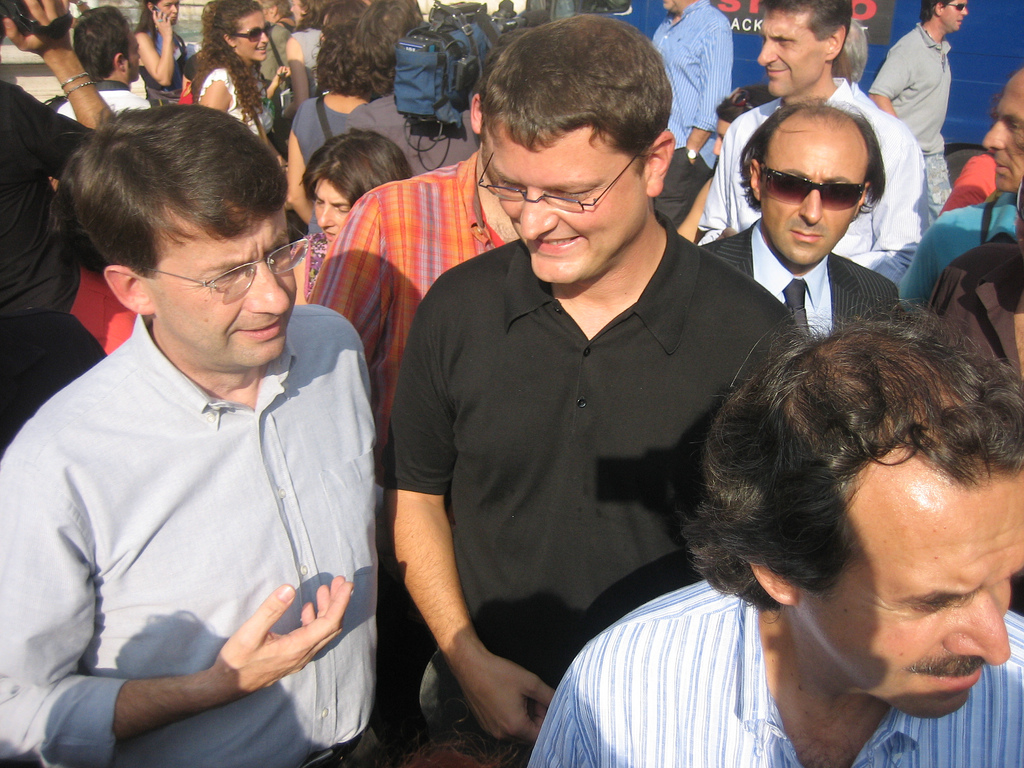
Franceschini with Gennaro Migliore.

Following the birth of the Olive Tree coalition, Franceschini re-entered the Italian People's Party, and from 1997 to 1999 he was its Deputy Secretary and Coordinator. He was appointed Undersecretary for Institutional Reforms in the D'Alema II Cabinet, and he maintained this position in the Amato II Cabinet. In the 2001 general election he was elected to the Italian Chamber of Deputies in Ferrara College 9, and he became a member of the Constitutional Affairs Commission of the Chamber. One of the founders of the Daisy Party, in July 2001 he joined the Constituent Committee of that party, which becomes the coordinating organ of the national party. The tasks of the party are confirmed by subsequent congresses in 2002 and 2004. He was a member of the Executive of the European Democratic Party and member of the Parliamentary Assembly of the Organisation for Security and Cooperation in Europe (OSCE). He is a founding member of the interparliamentary intercommission for fair and sustainable trade.

In the 2006 general election he was re-elected Deputy for the XI constituency of Emilia-Romagna and he was appointed Leader of the Olive Tree group in the Chamber. When the Daisy was merged with the Democrats of the Left to form the new Democratic Party on 14 October 2007, Secretary Walter Veltroni chose him as his Deputy.

== Secretary of the Democratic Party ==
With the birth of the Democratic Party 14 October 2007 and the ascent to the secretariat of Walter Veltroni, he became National Deputy Secretary of the new party. Following this appointment, he resigned from the presidency of the group Olive Tree in the House of Deputies, replaced by Antonello Soro.

He was Vice Chairman of the Council of Ministers in the shadow government of the Democratic Party from 9 May 2008 to 21 February 2009. He was elected deputy again in the general election of 2008. He represented until July 2012, the Italian Parliament to the Council of Europe and Western European Union Assembly.

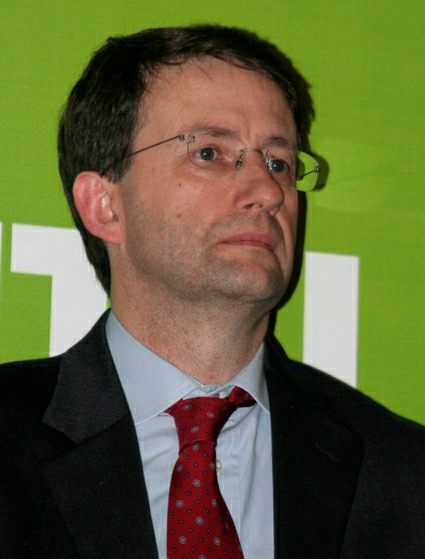
Franceschini in 2009.

On 21 February 2009, after the resignation of Walter Veltroni, he was elected secretary of the Democratic Party in the National Assembly, with 1,047 votes out of 1,258. His only opponent Arturo Parisi won just 92 votes.

His first act after the election was to swear the oath on a copy of the Italian Constitution, in front of the castle of his native Ferrara, in the hands of his father Giorgio Franceschini, former partisan and former deputy.

After of the primary elections of the Democratic Party of 25 October 2009, Franceschini was nominated secretary, along with Pier Luigi Bersani and Ignazio Marino. The slogan for his running for the position of secretary was "Free the Future". He organizes the election campaign focusing it on a series of speeches, "10 speeches to the Italians", which he delivers in cities or places related to the subject and significance for the history of the country. At Marzabotto, he delivers the "Address to the Free", in Genoa the "Address to the New Italian", in Cosenza the "Address to the Young People of the South." Each speech ends with the word "now", clearly inspired by the magazine Now, founded by Don Primo Mazzolari. The speeches are published in November 2009 in the book, published by Simon and Schuster: In ten words. Challenging the right over values Among the supporters of the candidacy of Franceschini there are Piero Fassino, Debora Serracchiani, Franco Marini, Marco Minniti, Giovanna Melandri, Tiziano Treu, Enrico Morando, Marina Sereni, Antonello Soro, Cesare Damiano, Pierluigi Castagnetti, Paolo Gentiloni, Sergio Cofferati, Rita Borsellino, Mario Adinolfi, David Sassoli. Former Secretary of the Democratic Party Walter Veltroni, while saying he would stay out of the party convention, had words of appreciation for the candidacy of Franceschini. He received support from many representatives from the world of culture and entertainment including Lorenzo Jovanotti, Nanni Moretti and Andrea Camilleri.

On 25 October 2009, in the primaries of the PD, Franceschini received over a million votes, representing 34% of the total, but was surpassed by Bersani, who then became the new secretary. That same evening, he acknowledged Bersani's victory and said that beyond the results, he would strive to ensure the unity of the party. On 17 November, he was elected President of the Parliamentary Group of the Democratic Party in the House of Representatives after Antonello Soro had resigned as deputy. After the defeat in the primaries, he rearranged all the forces that had supported his candidacy in a domestic component to the Democratic Party, Democratic Area, which is now seen as a benchmark.

== Minister in centre-left governments ==
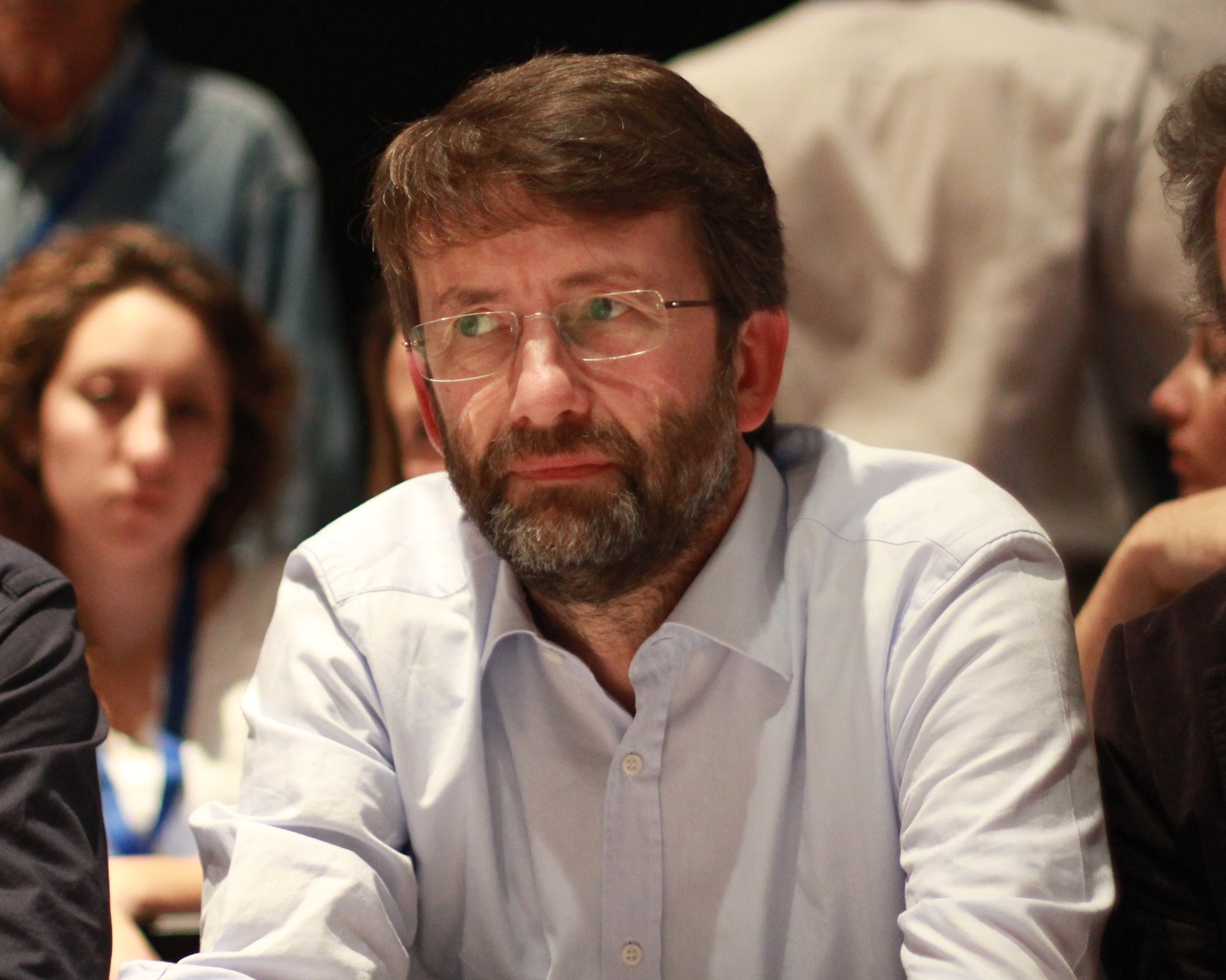
Franceschini at the Leopolda convention in Florence, 2014.

In the general elections of 2013 he was a candidate and was elected to the Chamber of Deputies as head of the list of the Democratic Party in the constituency of Emilia-Romagna.

From 28 April 2013 to 22 February 2014 was Minister for Relations with Parliament and the coordination of government activity in the government of Prime Minister Enrico Letta.

On 22 February 2014 he was sworn in as Minister of Cultural Heritage and Activities and Tourism in the government of Matteo Renzi. He presided over the Council of European Ministers of Culture and the European Forum of Ministers of Culture and Tourism in the second half of 2014.

On 12 December 2016, when Renzi resigned as Prime Minister after the constitutional referendum, Franceschini was confirmed as Culture Minister by the new Prime Minister Paolo Gentiloni.

== Controversies ==
=== Gift received while Minister ===
In October 2024, Dario Franceschini became indirectly involved in the "Golden Key" controversy, which centred around a valuable golden key gifted to his successor, former Culture Minister Gennaro Sangiuliano. The key, reportedly worth around 12,000 euros, was presented by Pompei's mayor, Carmine Lo Sapio, and later became the focus of a legal inquiry. According to the Italian investigative program Le Iene, Sangiuliano suggested in a confidential document that the key might be in the possession of Maria Rosaria Boccia, who denies this claim.

The case brought attention to Franceschini's own history with a similar key he received while in office. Italian law mandates that public officials return gifts valued over 300 euros, but Franceschini allegedly retained his golden key for three years, returning it only in the summer of 2024 after the scandal surfaced. Franceschini claimed he was unaware of the key's high value, assuming it was a symbolic ceremonial item.

However, the artisan who created the key publicly refuted such assumptions, stating that the item's value was "evident to the naked eye". The jeweller described the key as a finely crafted piece with embedded gemstones, including sapphires and rubies, making it unmistakable as a luxury item. This statement added to the controversy, questioning the awareness and accountability of public officials regarding the handling of valuable gifts.

== Literary activity ==
In 2006 he published his first novel Nelle vene quell'acqua d'argento ("That silver water in the veins"), which in 2007 won the Premier Roman in France Chambéry and, in Italy, the Opera Prima Prize of the City of Penne, Bacchelli Award. The novel was published by Gallimard in France in the series "L'Arpenteur", titled Dans les veines le fleuve d'argent, and later reissued in the paperback series "Folio". In 2007 he published the novel La follia improvvisa di Ignazio Rando ("The sudden madness of Ignazio Rando"), adapted as a play by the Varese theatre group "Giorni Dispari Teatro". In 2011 he released Daccapo ("Again"), a novel that features the son of a provincial notary who had 53 children by as many secret prostitutes. In 2013 he published his fourth novel Mestieri immateriali di Sebastiano Delgado ("The intangible crafts of Sebastiano Salgado").

He is a member of the jury of Premio Strega (Strega Prize).

== Published works ==
- Il Partito popolare a Ferrara: cattolici, socialisti e fascisti nella terra di Grosoli e don Minzoni (1985)
- Nelle vene quell'acqua d'argento (2006)
- La follia improvvisa di Ignazio Rando (2007)
- In 10 parole. Sfidare la Destra sui valori (2009)
- Daccapo (2011)
- Mestieri immateriali di Sebastiano Delgado (2013)
- Disadorna e altre storie (2017)

== Honours ==
- Spain: Knight Grand Cross of the Civil Order of Alfonso X, the Wise (24 June 2016).

Party political offices
New office	Deputy Secretary of the Democratic Party; 2007–2009	Succeeded by Enrico Letta
Preceded by Walter Veltroni	Secretary of the Democratic Party; 2009	Succeeded by Pier Luigi Bersani
Political offices
Preceded by Dino Piero Giarda	Minister for Parliamentary Relations; 2013–2014	Succeeded by Maria Elena Boschi
Preceded by Massimo Bray	Minister of Cultural Heritage and Tourism; 2014–2018	Succeeded by Alberto Bonisoli as Minister of Cultural Heritage
Preceded by Massimo Bray	Minister of Cultural Heritage and Tourism; 2014–2018	Succeeded by Gian Marco Centinaio as Minister of Tourism
Preceded by Alberto Bonisoli as Minister of Cultural Heritage	Minister of Culture; 2019–2022	Succeeded by Gennaro Sangiuliano
