= Michela Di Biase =

Italian politician (born 1980)

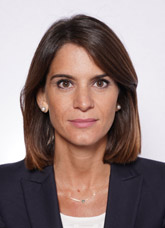
- Di Biase in 2022

Member of the Chamber of Deputies
- Incumbent
- Assumed office 13 October 2022
- Constituency: Lazio 1 – P02

Personal details
- Born: 17 October 1980 (age 45)
- Party: Democratic Party (since 2007)
- Spouse: Dario Franceschini (m. 2014)

Michela Di Biase (born 17 October 1980) is an Italian politician serving as a member of the Chamber of Deputies since 2022. She has been married to Dario Franceschini since 2014.

== Biography ==
Born and raised in Rome, in the Alessandrino neighborhood, she graduated from the Liceo Ginnasio Statale Benedetto da Norcia in Centocelle, completed her civil service, and earned a bachelor’s degree in History and Conservation of Artistic Heritage from the Faculty of Letters and Philosophy at Roma Tre University.

A member of the Democrats of the Left, she ran for the VII Municipal Council of Rome in the 2006 local elections, was elected, and focused on youth policy and equal opportunity. She was re-elected to the same municipal council in the 2008 local elections, becoming the group leader of the newly formed Democratic Party (Italy) (PD).

In the 2013 municipal elections, she ran for city councilor in Rome on the PD’s ticket, in support of mayoral candidate Ignazio Marino, and was elected to the Capitoline Assembly with approximately 4,528 votes, where she chairs the Committee on Culture, Youth Policy, and Labor. She ran again in the 2016 municipal elections and was re-elected to the Capitoline Assembly, where she became the PD’s floor leader under Virginia Raggi administration.

In the 2018 regional elections in Lazio, she ran as a candidate for the PD in support of incumbent President Nicola Zingaretti and was elected to the Lazio Regional Council in the Metropolitan City of Rome Capital district with 15,000 votes. For this reason, she first resigned as party leader and then, on September 27, 2018, as a city council member.

In the Regional Council of Lazio, she is known for her initiatives to combat gender inequality. The first regional law on STEM degrees (science, technology, engineering, and mathematics) is named after her; this law aims to combat gender biases and stereotypes and to promote learning, training, and the acquisition of specific skills in STEM disciplines.

Among the initiatives was the approval of the Regional Regulation on the Use of Gender-Inclusive Language, which has enabled the Regional Council of Lazio to become one of the leading legislative bodies in the fight against gender inequality and gender stereotypes.

In the 2023 Democratic Party primaries, she supported the motion put forward by Representative Elly Schlein, alongside “Area Dem.” According to various behind-the-scenes reports, she was the main proponent of this decision.
