= Alberto Bonisoli =

Italian politician

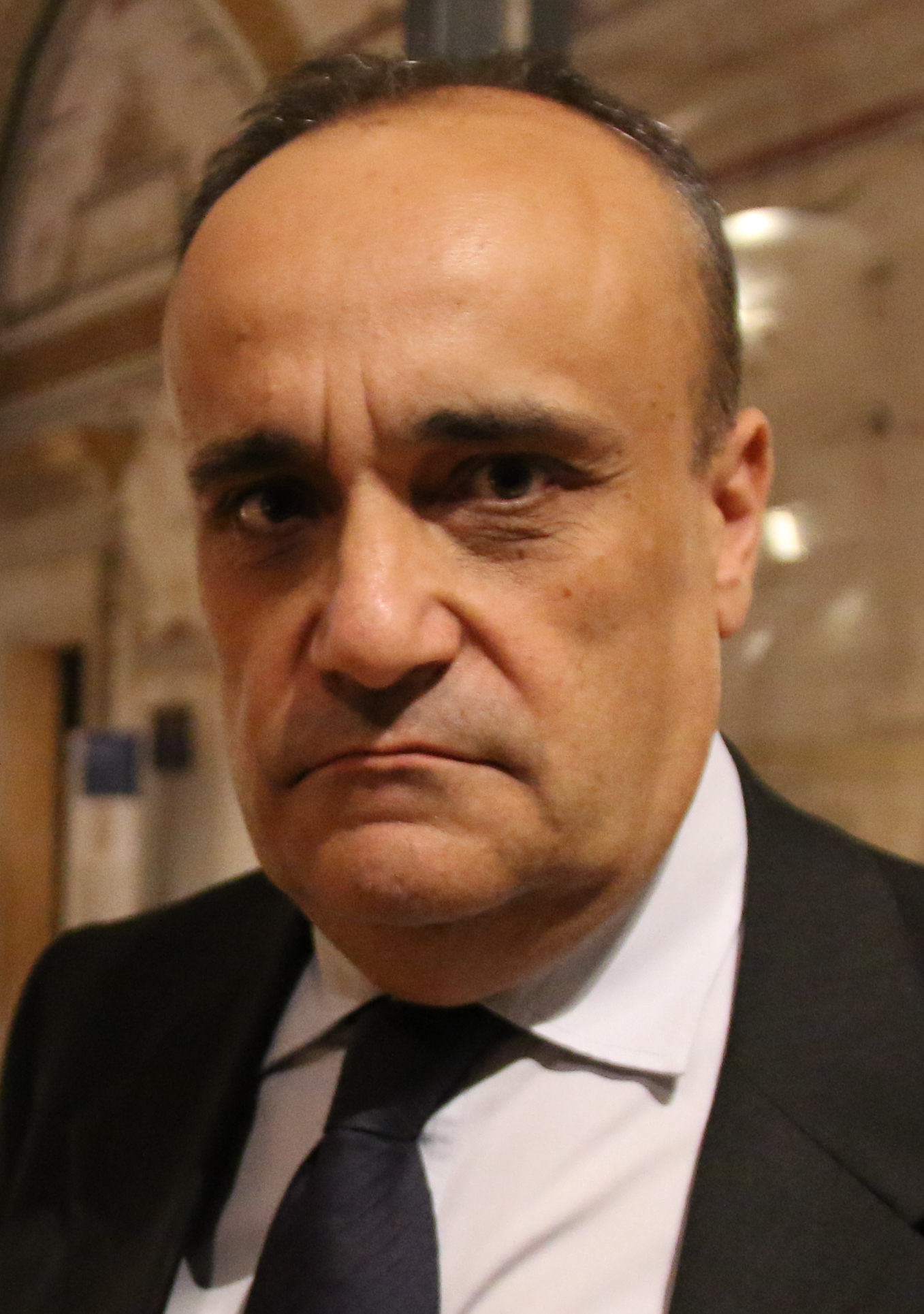

Minister of Cultural Heritage
- In office 1 June 2018 – 5 September 2019
- Prime Minister: Giuseppe Conte
- Preceded by: Dario Franceschini
- Succeeded by: Dario Franceschini

Personal details
- Born: 26 December 1961 (age 64) Castel d'Ario
- Party: Five Star Movement
- Education: Bocconi University

Alberto Bonisoli (born 26 December 1961) is an Italian politician.

== Biography ==
Bonisoli was born in Castel d'Ario, Mantua province. He graduated from the Bocconi University in 1986, where he subsequently became a professor of Innovation Management until 2002. Between 2012 and 2018 he was the director of the Nuova Accademia di Belle Arti, an Art, Fashion, Design private school in Italy. He was also the President of the Association of Italian Fashion Schools since 2013 and of the Association of Italian Art and Design Accredited Higher Education Institutions since 2017.

He was senior advisor for the European Union in Turkey (2004‒2005).

From 2005 to 2007 he cooperated with Italian Ministry of Education as senior expert for internationalization, member of the undersecretary Nando Dalla Chiesa's cabinet and member of the Directorate General for internationalization of the research activities.

In the period between 2006 and 2008 he was counselor at Studio Ambrosetti - The European House. From 2008 to 2012 he was the dean at Domus Academy, a Milanese design school.

During his professional activity, he offered technical advises to art, fashion and design schools in over 20 different countries, including Chile, China, Mexico, New Zealand, the UK and the US.

Between 2018 and 2019 he was the Italian Minister of Culture in the first Conte cabinet.

== Political career ==
In the 2018 Italian general election he was a candidate in the uninominal constituency of Lombardy 1 -12 but was not elected.

On 1 June 2018 Bonisoli was appointed Minister of Culture and Tourism of the Conte Cabinet.

== Government activities ==
- In July 2018, Bonisoli announced that he wanted to abolish the measure on free access to Italian museums on the first Sunday of the month. His statement triggered objections on social media. He later clarified that he wanted to change the measure, allowing museum directors to choose when people can gain free entry to their museums.
- In August 2018, following the collapse of the roof of a church in Rome, Bonisoli signed an administrative order to activate a special unit called "Unità per la Sicurezza del Patrimonio Culturale". It aims at monitoring buildings and sites protected by the cultural heritage list, avoiding possible problems of safety. The head of the unit is Fabio Carapezza Guttuso.
- On 27 September 2018, Bonisoli attended the reopening of the restored Sindone chapel in Turin that had been closed for restoration for more than 20 years, after a fire nearly destroyed it in 1997.
- On 16 October 2018, Bonisoli visited the archeological area of Pompeii. Along with the Director of the site, Massimo Osanna, he announced a discovery that changed the date of the volcano's eruption that destroyed Pompeii, Herculaneum and the whole area around the Vesuvius volcano.
- On 31 October 2018 Bonisoli went to Washington, D.C., to celebrate over 15 years of cooperation between American authorities and the special Carabinieri unit responsible for combatting illegal commerce of cultural heritage objects, stolen from Italy and sold around the world. During the event, an FBI delegate returned three ancient Greek vases to Italy.
- On 6 November 2018, following the incidents in Rome and Arezzo, Bonisoli announced the allocation of 109 million euros for safety in 314 statal cultural places.
- On 12 February 2019, Bonisoli flew in London to have back 12 artefacts and a page of a miniated manuscript. The restitution was possible thanks to the investigations of Italian Carabinieri art squad and the cooperation of Christie's auction house.
- On 26 February 2019, the new campaign of free access to the statal museums named "io vado al museo" began. 20 'free entry' days per year and €2 ticket for people between 18 and 25 years old
- On 6 March 2019, Italian Ministry of Culture handed back 594 'ex voto' paintings, stolen from Mexico and recovered by Italian Carabinieri art squad in Italy. At the restitution ceremony attended the Mexican cultural director, Alejandra Frausto
- On 22 March 2019, 796 artefacts stolen, sold in an improper way and recovered in Italy by Carabinieri art squad, were given back to China. "We were proud to return these pieces to our friends, as they are representative of the heritage and identity of the Chinese people» said mr. Bonisoli who also signed a memorandum with his Chinese counterpart, Luo Shugang, to tackle looting and black markets of smuggled pieces of art. They announced also a big exhibit of those recovered objects, to open in Beijing in autumn 2020.
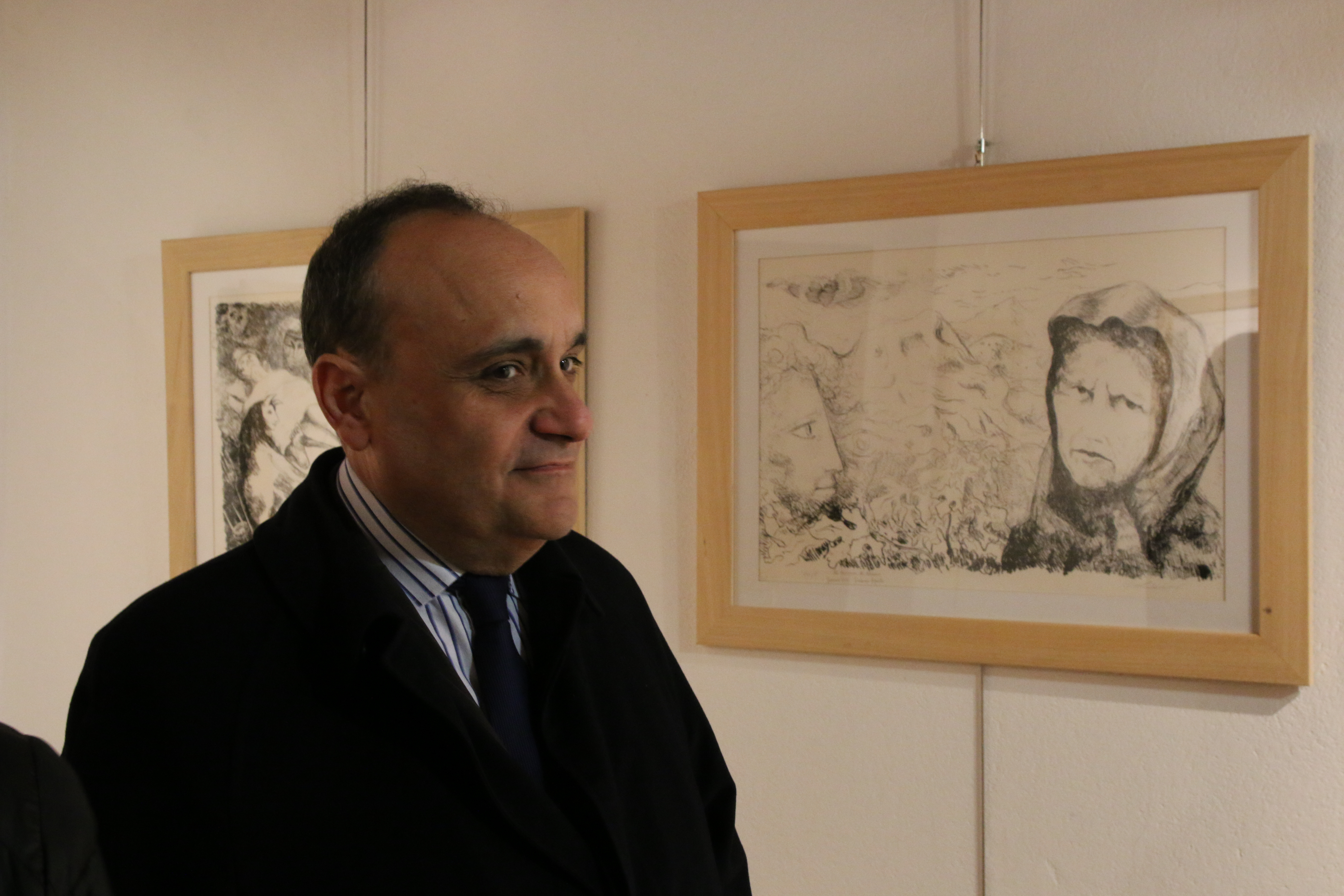

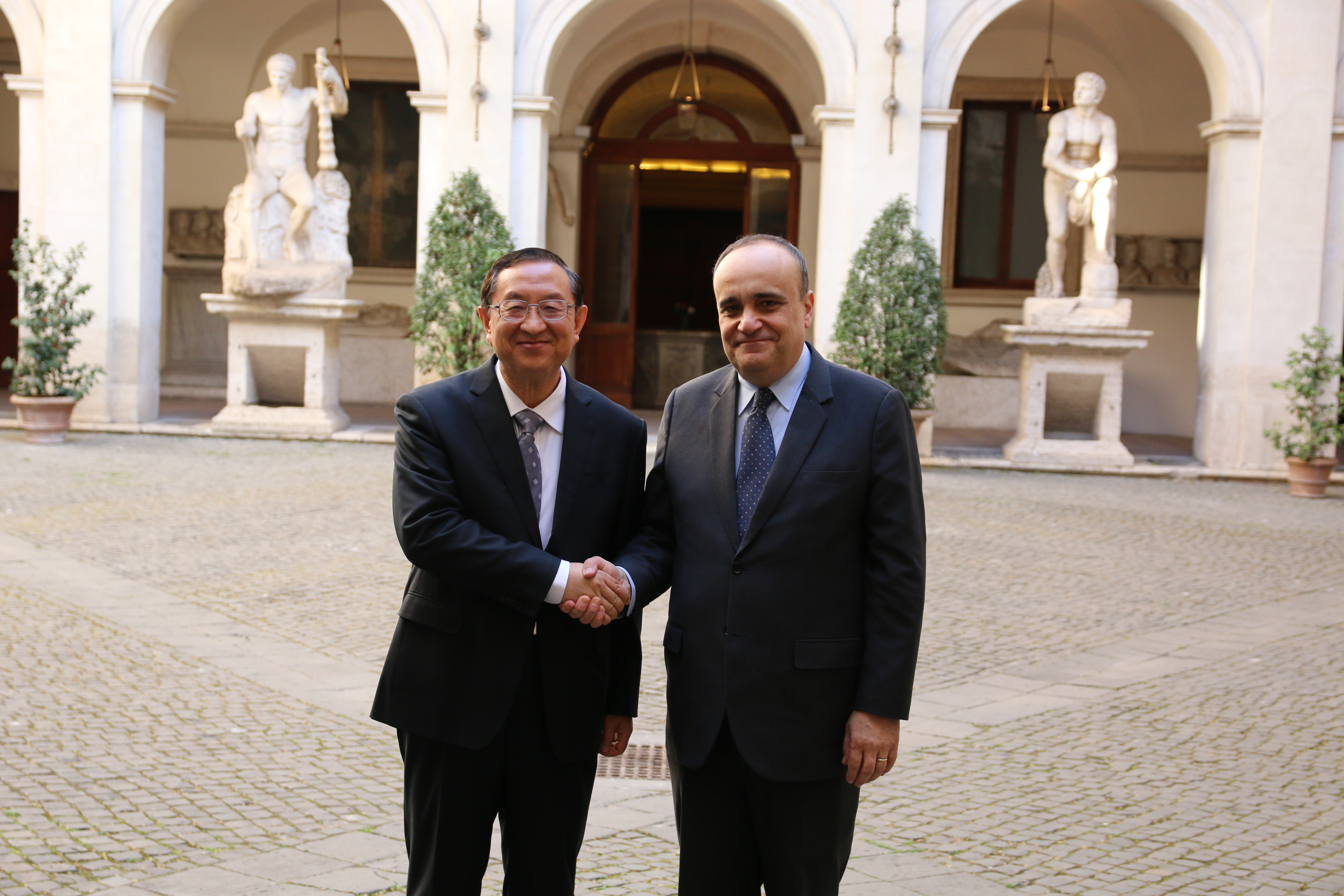

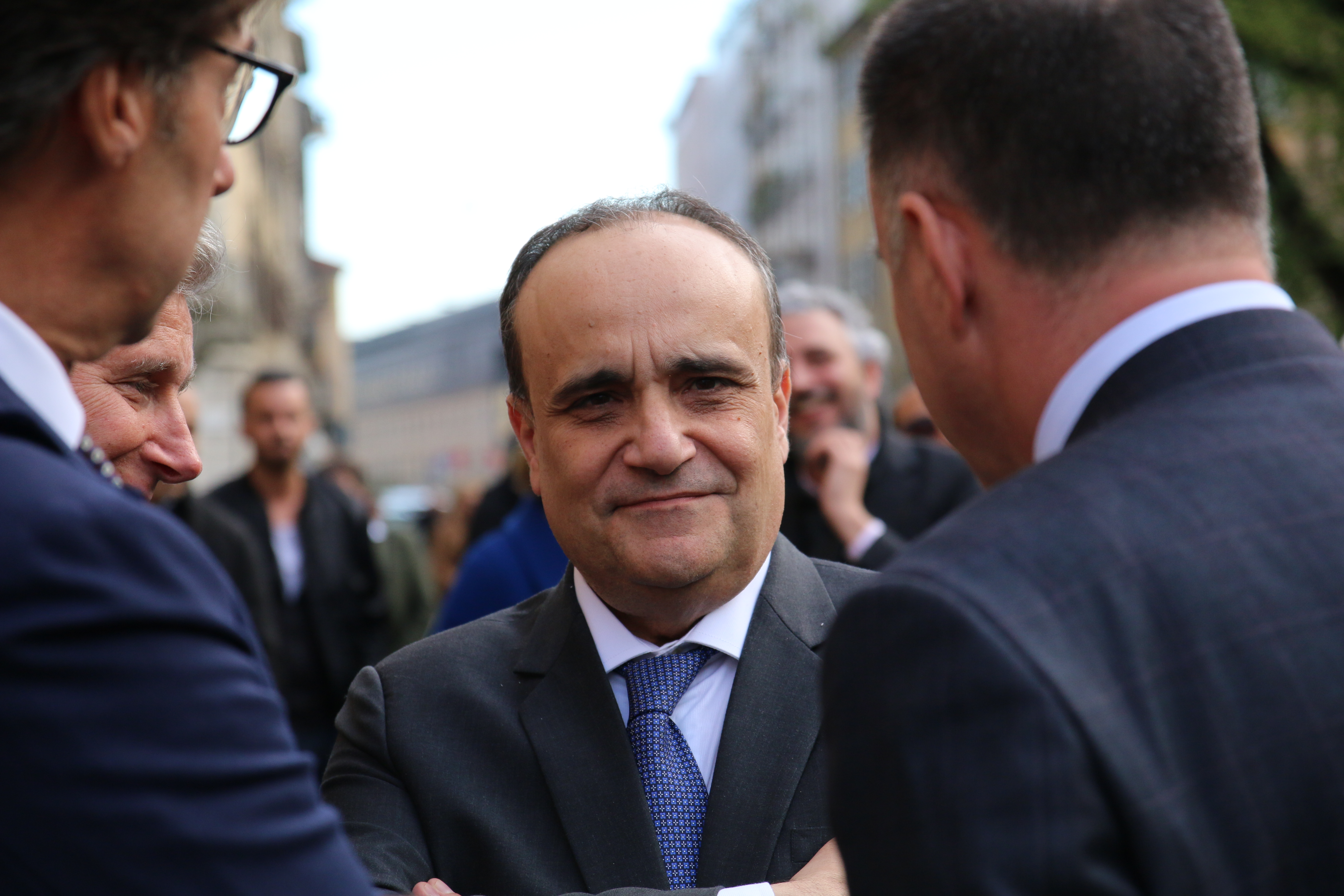

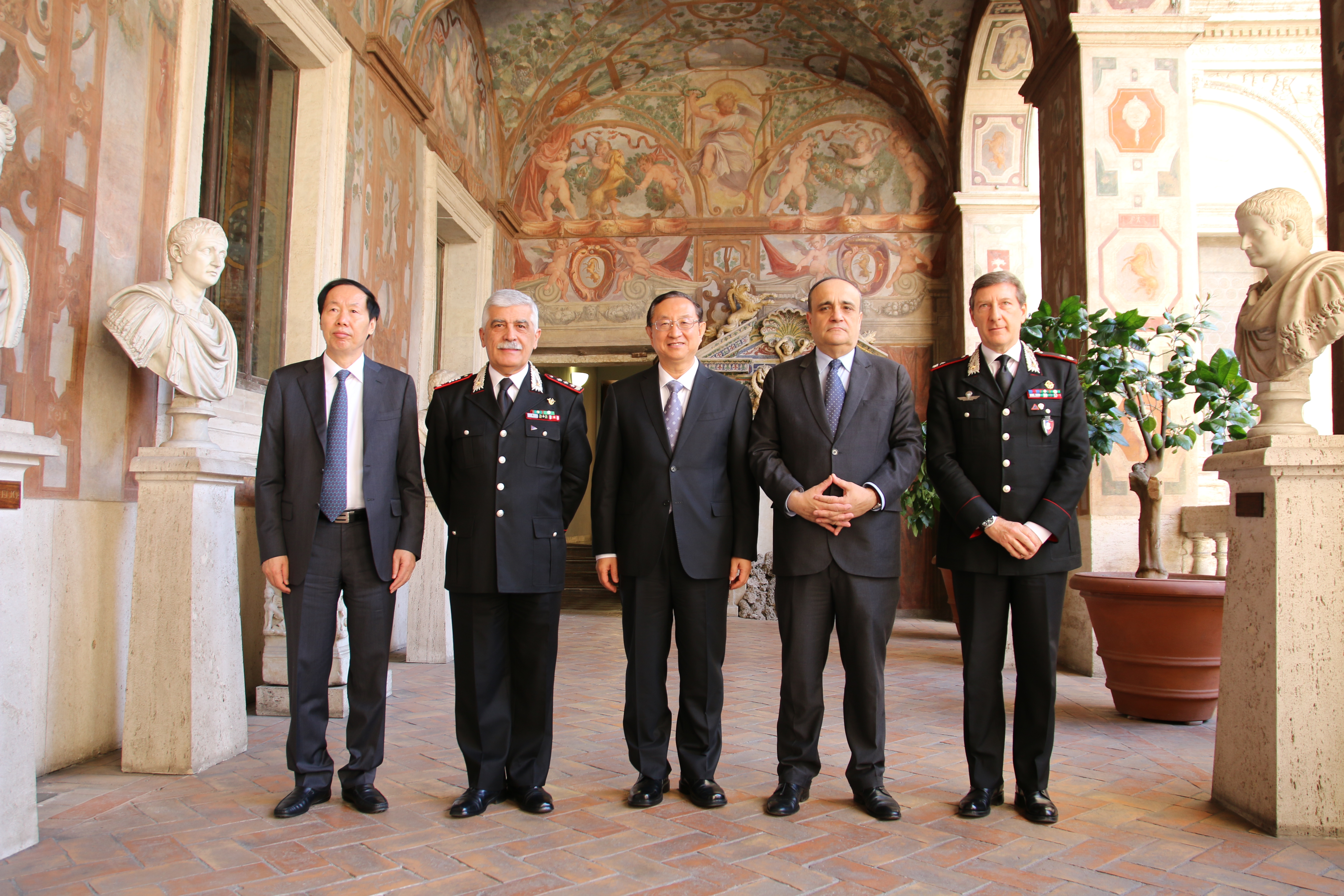

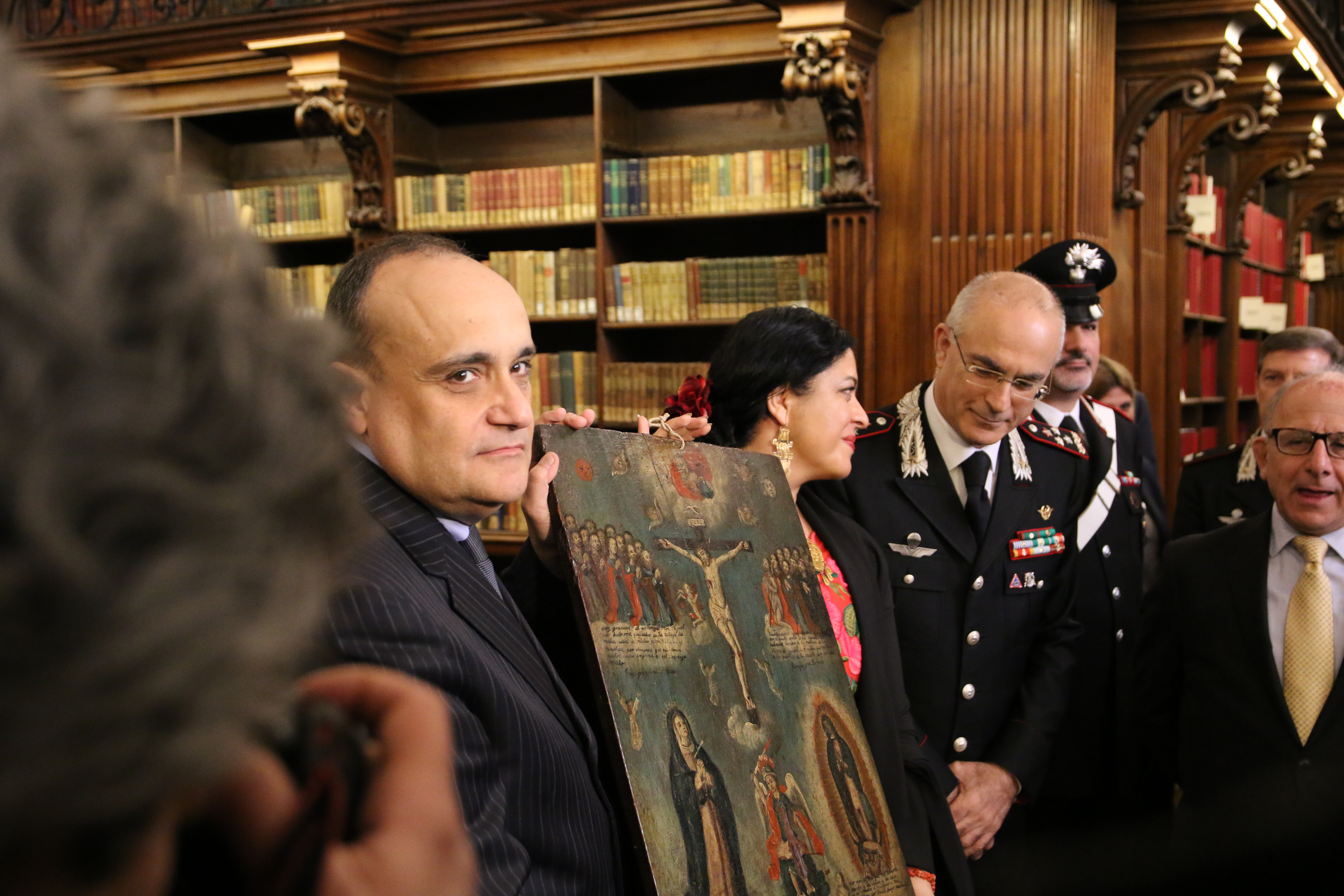

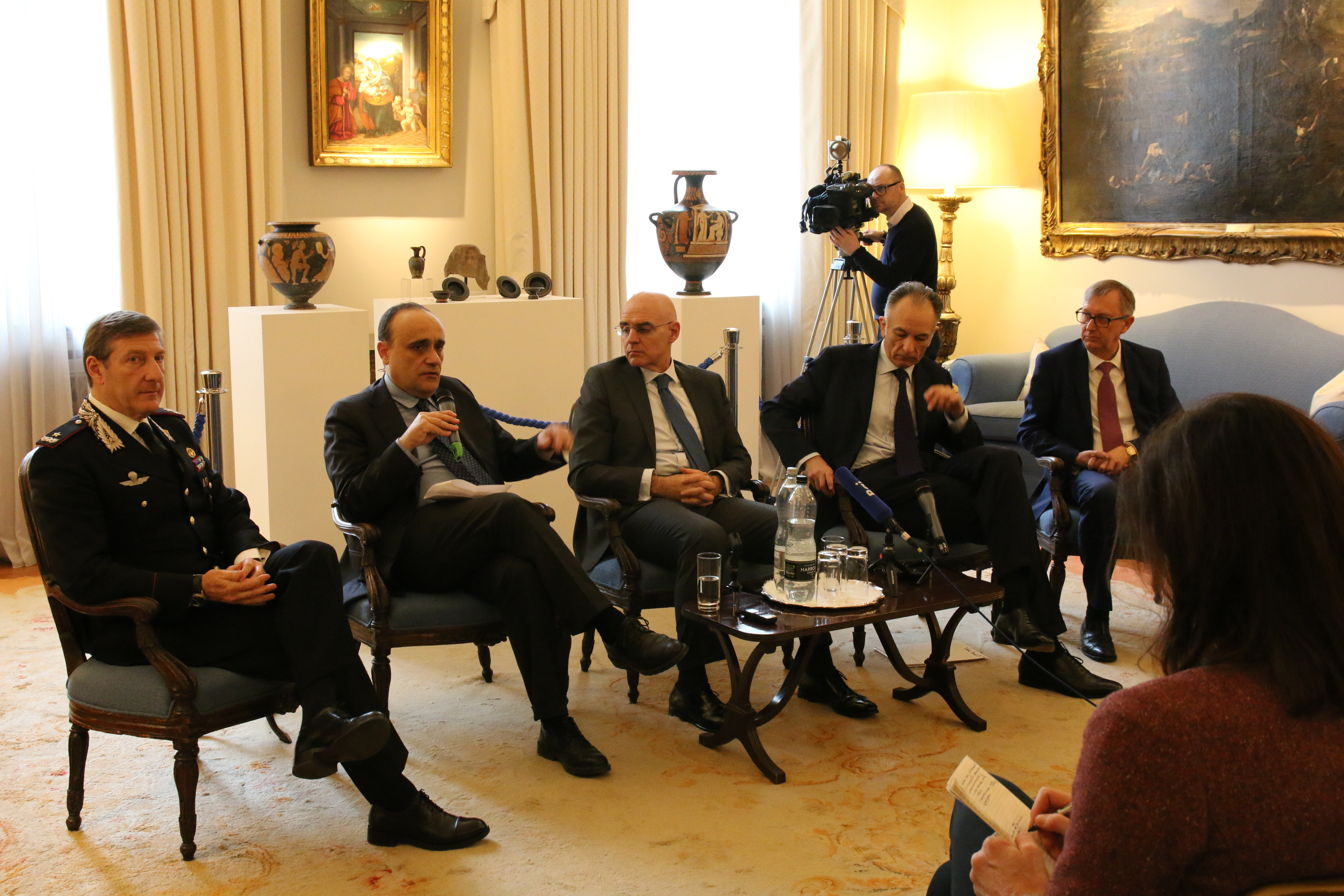

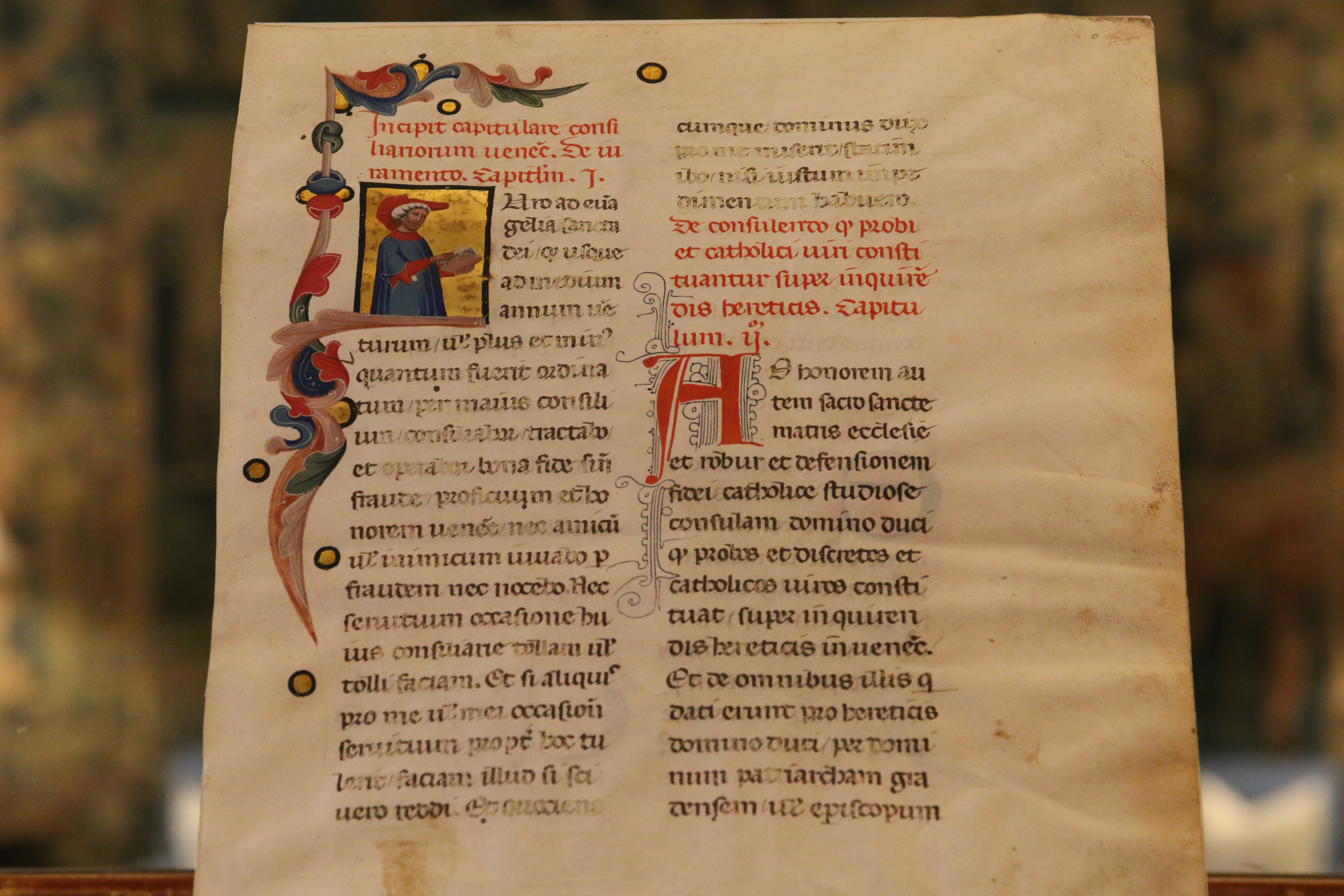

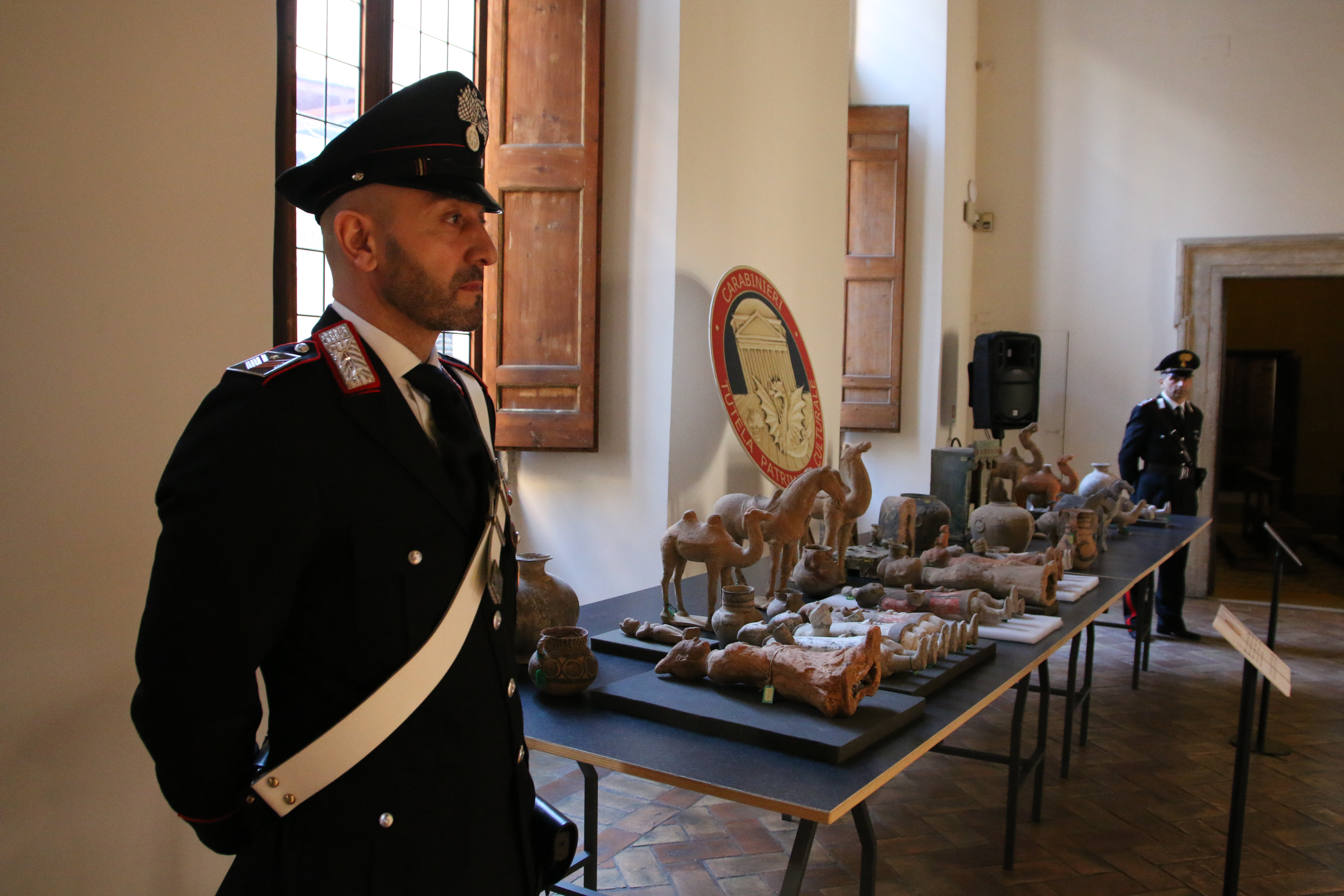

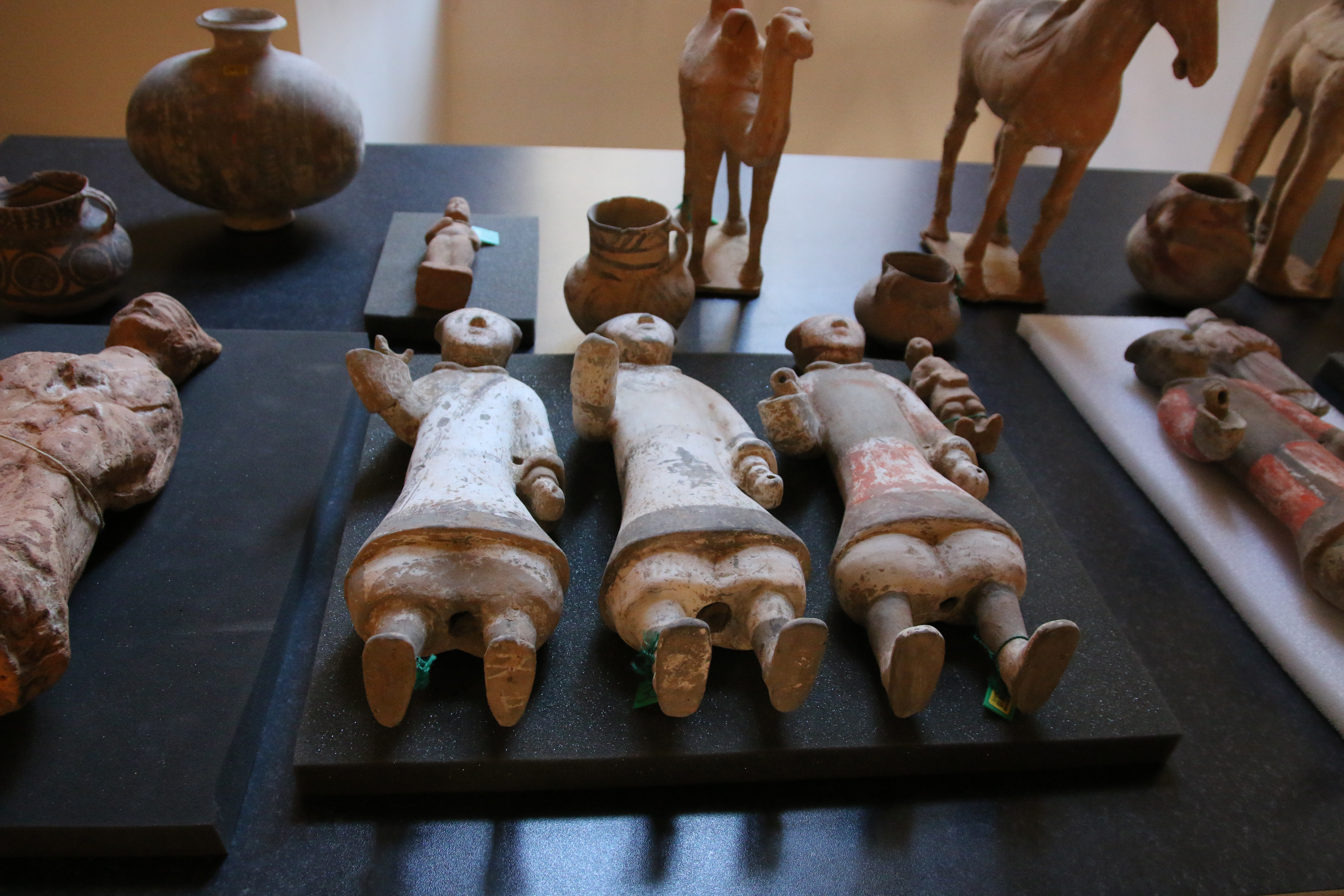
