= Minister of Culture (Italy) =

Ministry in the Cabinet of Italy

- Ministro della Cultura

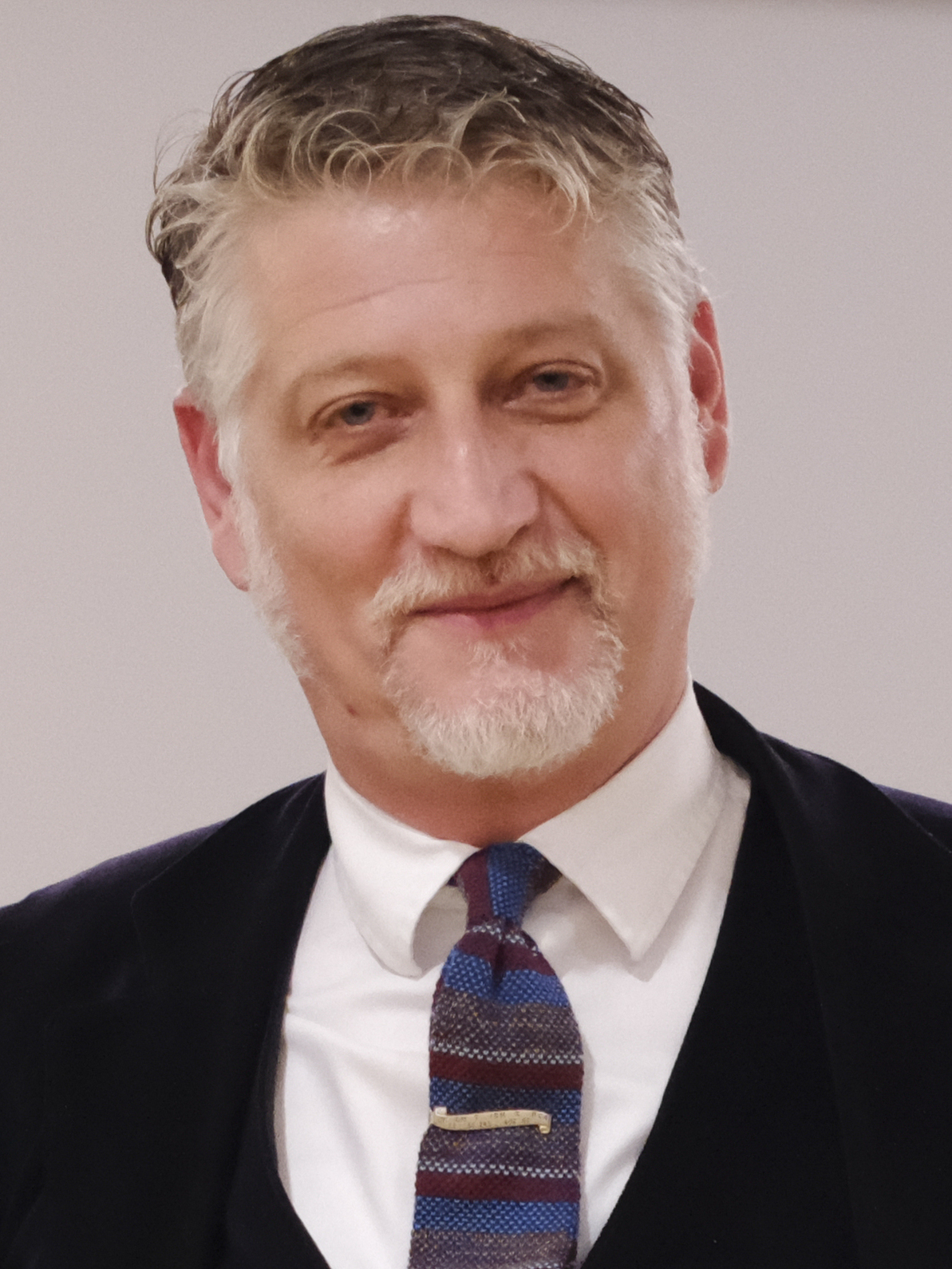
- Incumbent; Alessandro Giuli since 6 September 2024
- Ministry of Culture
- Member of: Council of Ministers
- Reports to: The prime minister
- Seat: Rome
- Appointer: The president
- Term length: No fixed term
- Formation: 23 November 1974; 51 years ago
- First holder: Giovanni Spadolini
- Website: www.cultura.gov.it

The minister of culture (Italian: ministro della cultura) leads the Ministry of Culture. The list shows also the ministers that served under the same office but with other names, in fact this ministry has changed name many times.

The current minister is Alessandro Giuli, who is serving since 6 September 2024 in the government of Giorgia Meloni. The longest-serving minister of culture is Dario Franceschini, of the Democratic Party.

== List of ministers ==
=== Parties ===
- 1974–1994:
  - Italian Republican Party
  - Christian Democracy
  - Italian Democratic Socialist Party
- 1994–present:
  - National Alliance
  - Democratic Party of the Left / Democrats of the Left
  - Forza Italia / The People of Freedom
  - Union of Christian and Centre Democrats
  - Democratic Party
  - Five Star Movement
  - Independent

=== Coalitions ===
- 1974–1994:
  - Centrist coalition
  - Organic centre-left
  - Pentapartito / Quadripartito
  - Mixed coalition
- 1994–present:
  - Centre-right coalition
  - Centre-left coalition
  - Mixed coalition

Portrait	Name (Born–Died)	Term of office			Party	Government	Ref.
Portrait	Name (Born–Died)	Took office	Left office	Time in office	Party	Government	Ref.
Minister for Cultural Heritage and the Environment
	Giovanni Spadolini (1925–1994)	23 November 1974	12 February 1976	1 year, 81 days	Italian Republican Party	Moro IV	
Minister for Cultural and Environmental Heritage
	Mario Pedini (1918–2003)	12 February 1976	11 March 1978	2 years, 27 days	Christian Democracy	Moro V Andreotti III	
	Dario Antoniozzi (1923–2019)	11 March 1978	4 August 1979	1 year, 146 days	Christian Democracy	Andreotti IV·V	
	Egidio Ariosto (1911–1998)	4 August 1979	4 April 1980	244 days	Italian Democratic Socialist Party	Cossiga I	
	Oddo Biasini (1917–2009)	4 April 1980	28 July 1981	1 year, 115 days	Italian Republican Party	Cossiga II; Forlani	
	Vincenzo Scotti (1933– )	28 July 1981	1 December 1982	1 year, 126 days	Christian Democracy	Spadolini I·II	
	Nicola Vernola (1932–2000)	1 December 1982	4 August 1983	246 days	Christian Democracy	Fanfani V	
	Antonino Pietro Gullotti (1922–1989)	4 August 1983	28 July 1987	3 years, 358 days	Christian Democracy	Craxi I·II	
	Antonino Pietro Gullotti (1922–1989)	4 August 1983	28 July 1987	3 years, 358 days	Christian Democracy	Fanfani VI	
	Carlo Vizzini (1947– )	29 July 1987	13 April 1988	259 days	Italian Democratic Socialist Party	Goria	
	Vincenza Bono Parrino (1942– )	13 April 1988	22 July 1989	1 year, 100 days	Italian Democratic Socialist Party	De Mita	
	Ferdinando Facchiano (1927–2022)	22 July 1989	12 April 1991	1 year, 264 days	Italian Democratic Socialist Party	Andreotti VI	
	Giulio Andreotti (1919–2013) As Prime Minister	12 April 1991	28 June 1992	1 year, 77 days	Christian Democracy	Andreotti VI·VII	
	Alberto Ronchey (1926–2010)	28 June 1992	10 May 1994	1 year, 316 days	Italian Republican Party	Amato I	
	Alberto Ronchey (1926–2010)	28 June 1992	10 May 1994	1 year, 316 days	Italian Republican Party	Ciampi	
	Domenico Fisichella (1935– )	10 May 1994	17 January 1995	252 days	National Alliance	Berlusconi I	
	Antonio Paolucci (1939–2024)	17 January 1995	17 May 1996	1 year, 121 days	Independent	Dini	
Minister of Cultural Heritage and Activities and Sport
	Walter Veltroni (1955– )	17 May 1996	21 October 1998	2 years, 157 days	Democratic Party of the Left	Prodi I	
Minister of Cultural Heritage and Activities
	Giovanna Melandri (1962– )	21 October 1998	11 June 2001	2 years, 233 days	Democrats of the Left	D'Alema I·II; Amato II	
	Giuliano Urbani (1937– )	11 June 2001	23 April 2005	3 years, 316 days	Forza Italia	Berlusconi II	
	Rocco Buttiglione (1948– )	23 April 2005	17 May 2006	1 year, 24 days	Union of Christian and Centre Democrats	Berlusconi III	
	Francesco Rutelli (1954– )	17 May 2006	8 May 2008	1 year, 357 days	The Daisy / Democratic Party	Prodi II	
	Sandro Bondi (1959– )	8 May 2008	23 March 2011	2 years, 319 days	The People of Freedom	Berlusconi IV	
	Giancarlo Galan (1956– )	23 March 2011	16 November 2011	238 days	The People of Freedom	Berlusconi IV	
	Lorenzo Ornaghi (1948– )	16 November 2011	28 April 2013	1 year, 163 days	Independent	Monti	
Minister of Cultural Heritage and Activities and Tourism
	Massimo Bray (1959– )	28 April 2013	22 February 2014	300 days	Democratic Party	Letta	
	Dario Franceschini (1958– )	22 February 2014	1 June 2018	4 years, 99 days	Democratic Party	Renzi; Gentiloni	
Minister of Cultural Heritage and Activities
	Alberto Bonisoli (1961– )	1 June 2018	5 September 2019	1 year, 96 days	Five Star Movement	Conte I	
Minister of Culture
	Dario Franceschini (1958– )	5 September 2019	22 October 2022	3 years, 47 days	Democratic Party	Conte II; Draghi	
	Gennaro Sangiuliano (1962– )	22 October 2022	6 September 2024	1 year, 320 days	Independent	Meloni	
	Alessandro Giuli (1975– )	6 September 2024	Incumbent	2 years, 1 day	Independent	Meloni	
