= Alessandro Giuli =

Italian journalist and politician (born 1975)

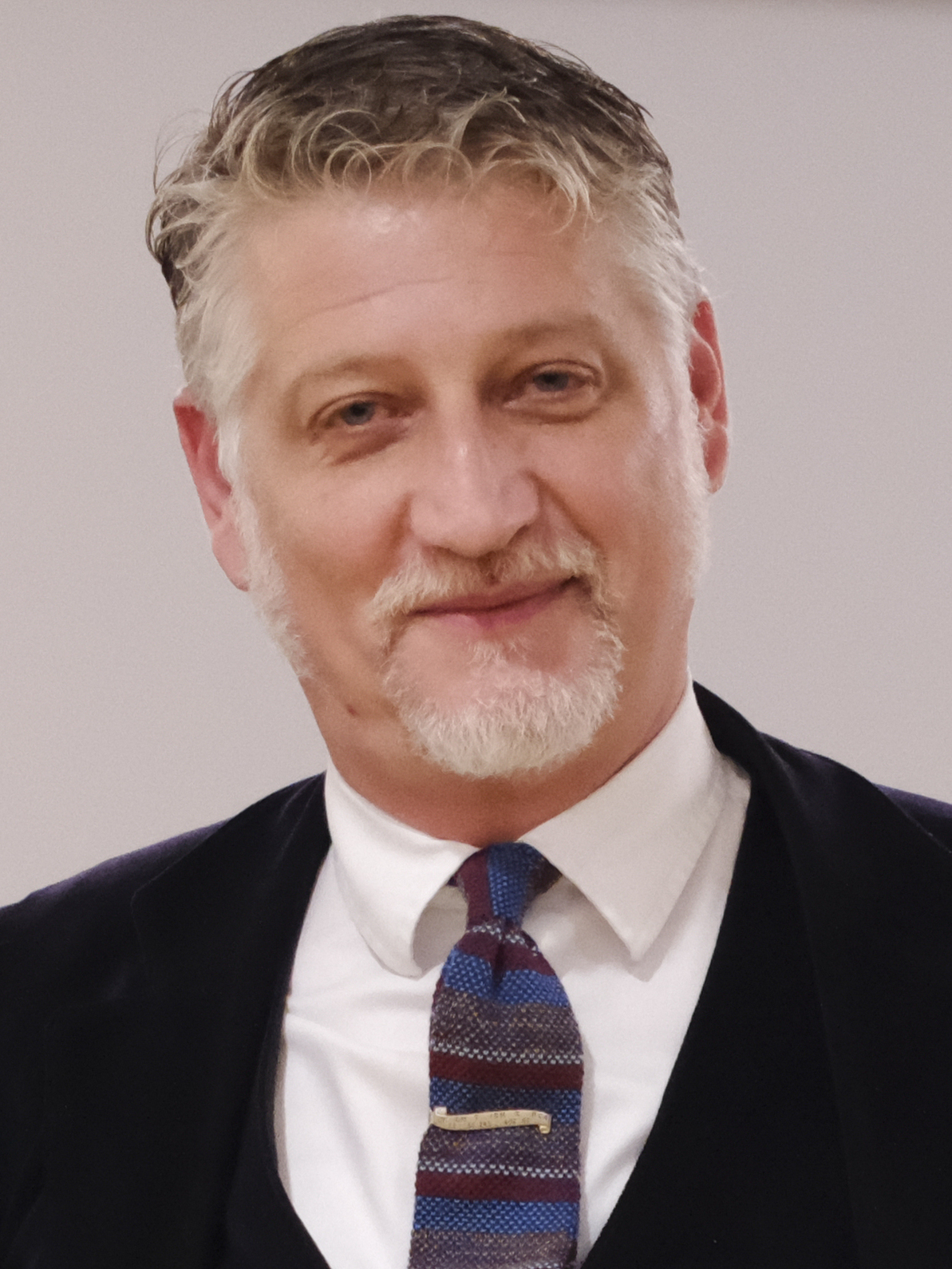
- Giuli in 2024

Minister of Culture
- Incumbent
- Assumed office 6 September 2024
- Prime Minister: Giorgia Meloni
- Preceded by: Gennaro Sangiuliano

President of the MAXXI Foundation
- In office 12 December 2022 – 6 September 2024
- Preceded by: Giovanna Melandri
- Succeeded by: Maria Emanuela Bruni

Personal details
- Born: 27 September 1975 (age 50) Rome, Italy
- Party: Independent
- Other political affiliations: Meridiano Zero (formerly); Youth Front (formerly)
- Spouse: Valeria Falcioni
- Children: 2
- Occupation: Journalist • politician

Alessandro Giuli (born 27 September 1975) is an Italian journalist and politician who has been Minister of Culture in the government of Giorgia Meloni since 6 September 2024.

== Early life and career ==
Giuli was born in Rome on 27 September 1975. During his youth, he became a member of Meridiano Zero, a far-right and neo-fascist movement. Giuli has a history of youth activism in the far right. He inherited his political beliefs from his father's side of the family, as his paternal grandfather was a staunch supporter of Benito Mussolini's regime and the Republic of Salò. At fourteen, Giuli joined the Youth Front, the youth organization of the Italian Social Movement (MSI), a party nostalgic for fascism and a successor of the Republican Fascist Party, the ruling party of the Republic of Salò. He also participated in neo-fascist and neo-Nazi movements active in Rome.

Giuli studied philosophy at the La Sapienza University of Rome, without graduating. During those years, he developed a passion for pre-Christian paganism and ancient Italic populations, to which he would later dedicate studies and research with connections to neo-fascist culture, which throughout the 20th century was often inspired by the rituals and imagery of those peoples.

Giuli began his journalistic career in some local newspapers and then moved to Il Foglio, where he was first appointed deputy director in 2008 and then co-director until 2017. From February to November 2017, he was director of Tempi. He also worked for Linkiesta, Il Tempo, and Libero. In addition to journalism, Giuli wrote several books, including Il passo delle oche. L'identità irrisolta dei postfascisti, Individui e potere tra identità e integrazione, and E viene la Magna Madre: i riti, il culto e l'azione di Cibele Romana, and was a member of the scientific committee of the Leonardo-Civiltà delle Macchine Foundation and an analyst and consultant for the Med-Or Foundation.

Giuli expanded his career to television entertainment, and collaborated with Corriere dell'Umbria and L'Argonauta on Rai Radio 1. He became a popular face on television between 2019 and 2020 when he was a regular guest on the Patriae show hosted by Annalisa Bruchi on Rai 2. In 2020, alongside Francesca Fagnani, Giuli co-hosted Seconda linea on Rai 2, a show that ended after two episodes. He was also a frequent guest of the Otto e mezzo show hosted by Lilli Gruber on La7.

== President of MAXXI Foundation and Minister of Culture ==
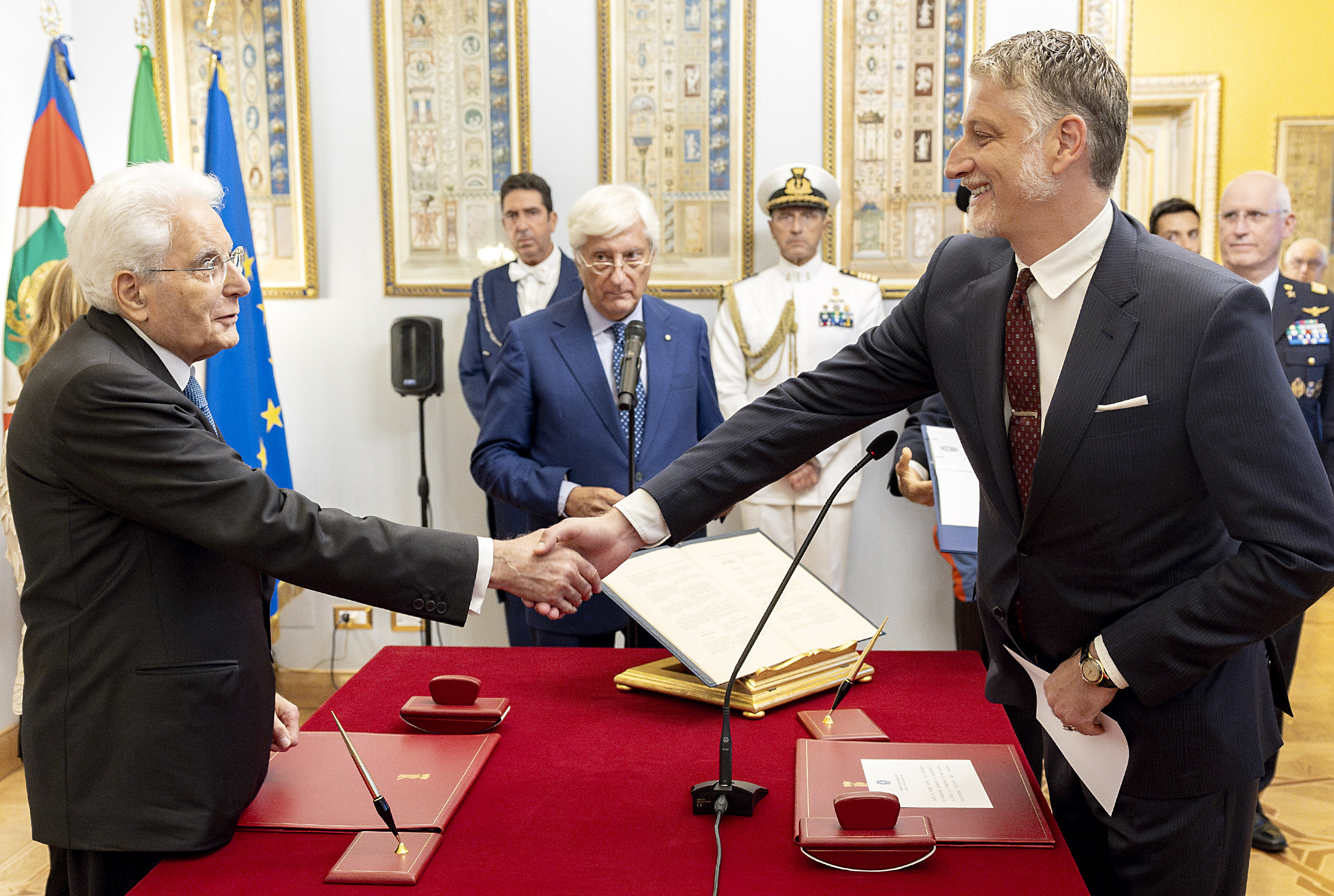
Giuli sworning in as minister to president Sergio Mattarella

On 23 November 2022, the Minister of Culture Gennaro Sangiuliano appointed him president of the MAXXI Foundation, with effect from 12 December 2022. On 21 June 2023, during the opening of Estate al MAXXI, Vittorio Sgarbi was a guest. On stage, Sgarbi, who at the time was Undersecretary of Culture, while speaking with singer Morgan, made several vulgar and sexist remarks. On 2 July 2023, as the president of the MAXXI Museum, Giuli expressed regret over the controversial intervention by Sgarbi.

On 6 September 2024, following Sangiuliano's resignation, Giuli was appointed as new Minister of Culture. The following day, he made his first appearance in his role as Minister of Culture in the last day of the 81st Venice International Film Festival.

== Personal life ==
Giuli is married with Valeria Falcioni, a Sky TG24 journalist. Together, they have two children (born in 2016 and 2019). Giuli is fond of wine and is a collector of cigars.

Giuli has often been described by commentators as cultivating a marked interest in mystical, esoteric, and archaic spiritual themes alongside his political career. His 2025 book Antico presente. Viaggio nel sacro vivente collects earlier cultural essays centered on what he calls a living sacred tradition rooted in ancient Roman and Italic sapiential heritage, evoking "something esoteric" in its exploration of subterranean cultural continuities . Press coverage has also noted his participation in events with contemporary Templar associations, presenting this as part of a broader fascination with chivalric and symbolic orders.
