= Ministry of Culture (Italy) =

Government ministry of Italy

- Ministero della Cultura; MiC
- Logo

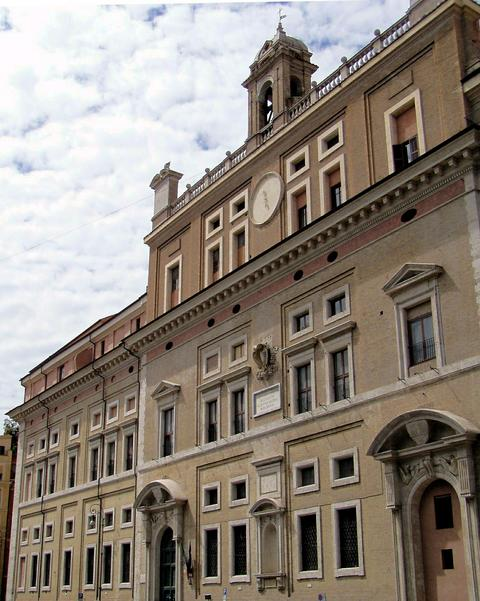
- Headquarters in Rome

Agency overview
- Formed: 1974
- Jurisdiction: Council of Ministers of Italy
- Headquarters: Collegio Romano Palace, Rome, Italy
- Annual budget: € 1.563 billion (Budget 2015)
- Minister responsible: Alessandro Giuli
- Website: www.cultura.gov.it

The Ministry of Culture (Italian: Ministero della Cultura - MiC) is the ministry of the Government of Italy in charge of national museums and maintenance of historical monuments. MiC's headquarters are located in the historic Collegio Romano Palace (via del Collegio Romano 27, in central Rome) and the current Minister of Culture is Alessandro Giuli.

== History ==
It was set up in 1974 as the Ministry for Cultural Assets and Environments (Italian: Ministero per i Beni Culturali ed Ambientali) by the Moro IV Cabinet through the decree read on 14 December 1974, n. 657, converted (with changes) from the law of 29 January 1975, n° 5. The new ministry (defined as per i beni culturali — that is for cultural assets, showing the wish to create a mainly technical organ) largely has the remit and functions previously under the Ministry of Public Education (specifically its Antiquity and Fine Arts, and Academies and Libraries, sections). To this remit and functions it some of those of the Ministry of the Interior (State archives) and of the President of the Council of Ministers (state computer archives, publishing and diffusion of culture).

Legislative decree number 368 of 20 October 1998 set up the Ministero per i Beni e le Attività Culturali, with all the old ministry's remits as well as some new ones:

- promotion of sports and sports arenas
- promotion of shows, in all their forms

In 2006, the sport portfolio was reassigned to the new Dipartimento per le Politiche Giovanili e le Attività Sportive.

The ministry is principally concerned with culture, the protection and preservation of artistic sites and property, landscape, and tourism (Decree 181/2006). At the end of 2006, the ministry's departments were abolished and their responsibilities returned to the ministry itself.

In 2009 the Ministry's organisational structure underwent significant changes (Decree 91/2009): the coordination of ministerial functions is still entrusted to a Secretary General, the General Directorates have been reduced from nine to eight, with new denominations and a partial reshaping of their responsibilities. The eight General Directorates continue to be technically supported by high level scientific bodies (Central Institutes).

The peripheral ministerial structure of Ministry of Cultural Heritage and Activities is provided for, in 17 out of 20 regions, by Regional Directorates for Cultural Heritage and Landscape and by the local Soprintendenze.

On 1 March 2021 the "Ministry of Cultural Heritage and Activities and Tourism" was renamed into the "Ministry of Culture".

== Organisation ==
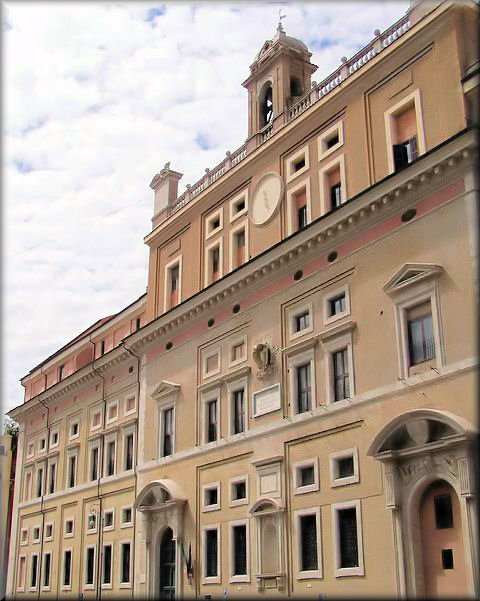
Collegio Romano palace - headquarters of the Ministry of Cultural Heritage and Activities

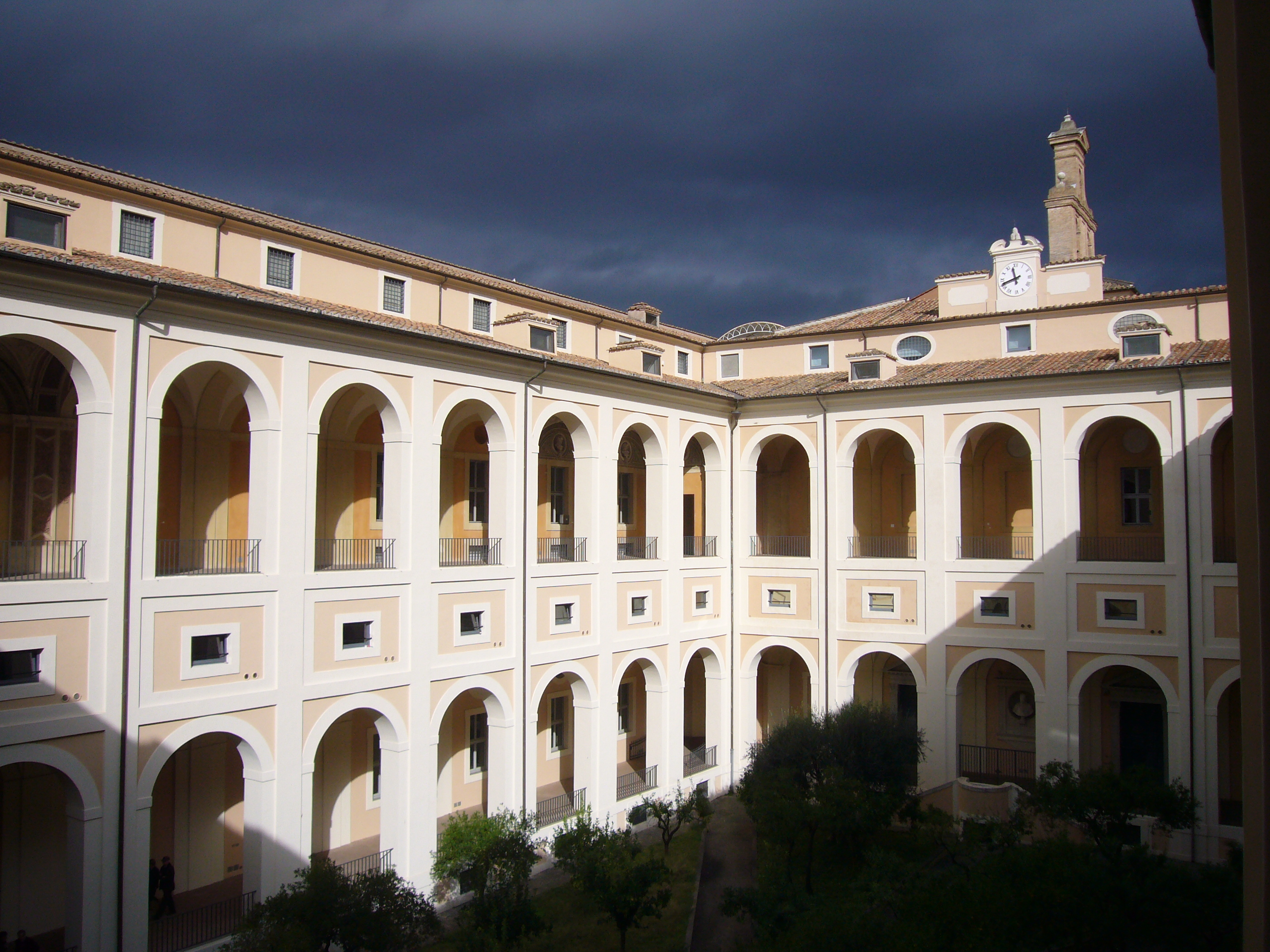
San Michele a Ripa Monumental Complex, headquarters of the Direzione generale per il paesaggio, le belle arti, l’architettura e l’arte contemporanee (PaBAAC), the Istituto Centrale per il Catalogo e la Documentazione (ICCD) and offices

=== Central administration ===
The Ministry is made up of a variety of internal divisions, including:

- Ufficio di gabinetto
- Segreteria del ministro
- Ufficio stampa
- Ufficio legislativo
- Organismo Indipendente di Valutazione della performance
- Direzioni Generali (General Directorates):
- Direzione generale Archeologia, belle arti e paesaggio - in charge of the landscape, fine arts, architectural and art heritage
- Direzione generale Archivi - in charge of national archives
- Direzione generale Biblioteche e diritto d'autore - in charge of national libraries and copyright
- Direzione generale Bilancio - in charge of internal organisation
- Direzione generale Cinema e audiovisivo - in charge of cinematography
- Directorate-General for Contemporary Creativity - in charge of art of XX and XXI century
- Direzione generale Educazione, ricerca e istituti culturali - in charge of education and cultural institutes
- Direzione generale Musei - in charge of state museums
- Direzione generale Organizzazione - in charge of internal organisation
- Direzione generale Sicurezza del patrimonio culturale - in charge of security of the cultural heritage
- Direzione generale Spettacolo - in charge of music, dance and theater

Istituti Centrali (Central Institutes):

- Istituto Centrale per il Restauro - Central Institute of Restoration
- Opificio delle pietre dure - The Opificio
- Istituto centrale per il catalogo e la documentazione
- Istituto centrale per il restauro e la conservazione del patrimonio archivistico e librario

=== Associated organs ===
- Direzioni Regionali per i Beni Culturali e Paesaggistici (Regional Directorates for Cultural Heritage and Landscape)
- Soprintendenze (Superintendencies)
  - Soprintendenze per i Beni Architettonici e il Paesaggio (Superintendencies for Architectural Heritage and Landscape)
  - Soprintendenze per il Patrimonio Storico, Artistico ed Etnoantropologico (Superintendencies for Historical Patrimony, Artistic and Ethno-Anthropological Heritage)
  - Soprintendenze per i Beni Archeologici (Superintendencies for Archaeological Heritage)
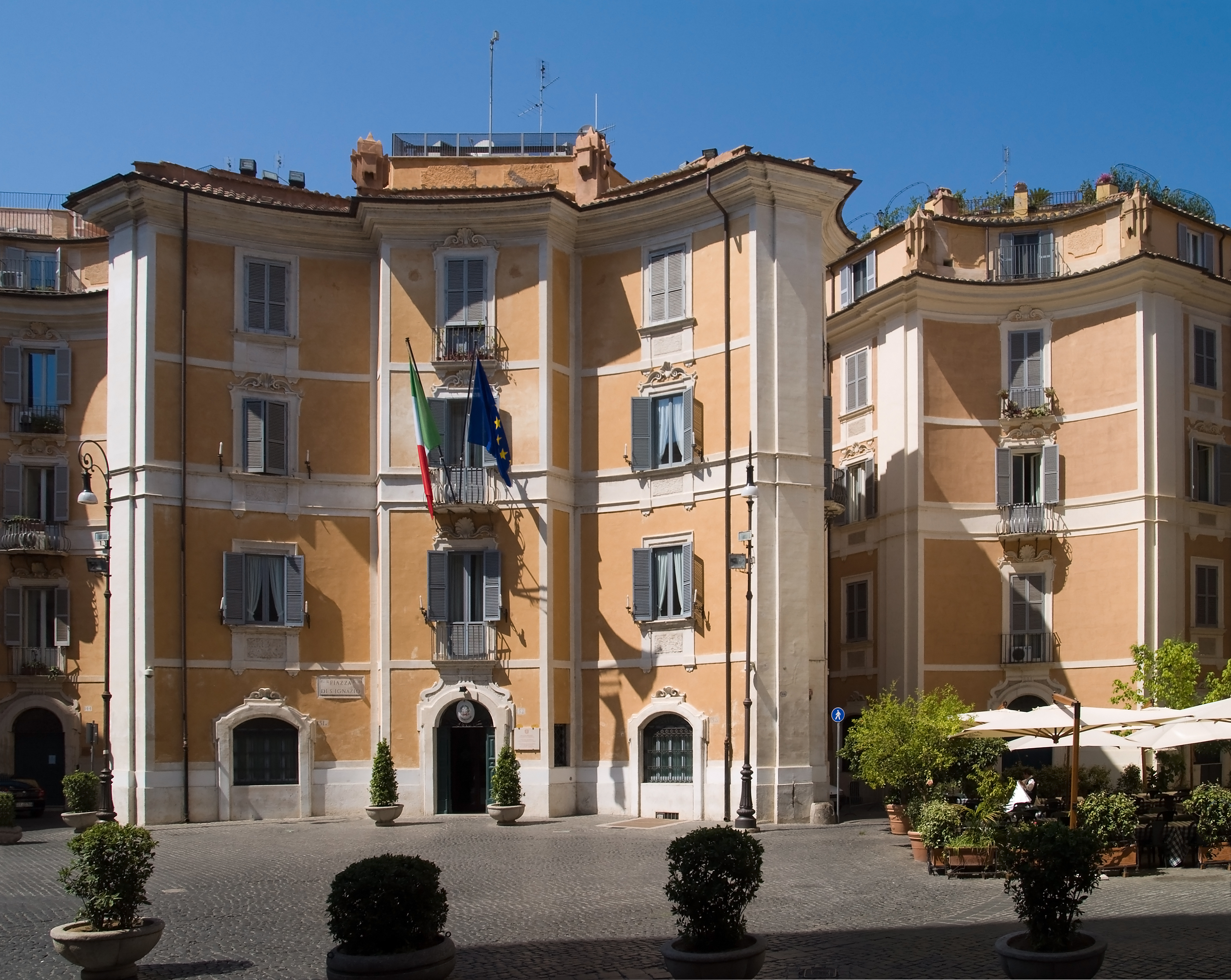
    The Carabinieri Headquarters for the Protection of Cultural Heritage
  - Soprintendenze Archivistiche (Archival Superintendencies)
- Archivi di Stato (National Archives)
- Biblioteche Statali (National Libraries)
- Musei (Museums)
- Comando Carabinieri per la Tutela del Patrimonio Culturale - Carabinieri Art Squad is the branch of the Italian Carabinieri responsible for combatting art and antiquities crimes

== Official names ==
- 1974–1998: Ministero per i beni culturali e ambientali (Ministry for Cultural Heritage and Environments)
- 1998–2013: Ministero per i beni e le attività culturali (Ministry for Cultural Heritage and Activities)
- 2013–2018: Ministero dei beni e delle attività culturali e del turismo (Ministry of Cultural Heritage and Activities and Tourism)
- 2018-2019: Ministero per i beni e le attività culturali (Ministry for Cultural Heritage and Activities)
- 2019-2021: Ministero dei beni e delle attività culturali e del turismo (Ministry of Cultural Heritage and Activities and Tourism)
- Since 2021: Ministero della cultura (Ministry of Culture)

== List of ministers ==
The current minister is Alessandro Giuli, appointed on 6 September 2024 by Prime Minister Giorgia Meloni.

== Logo ==
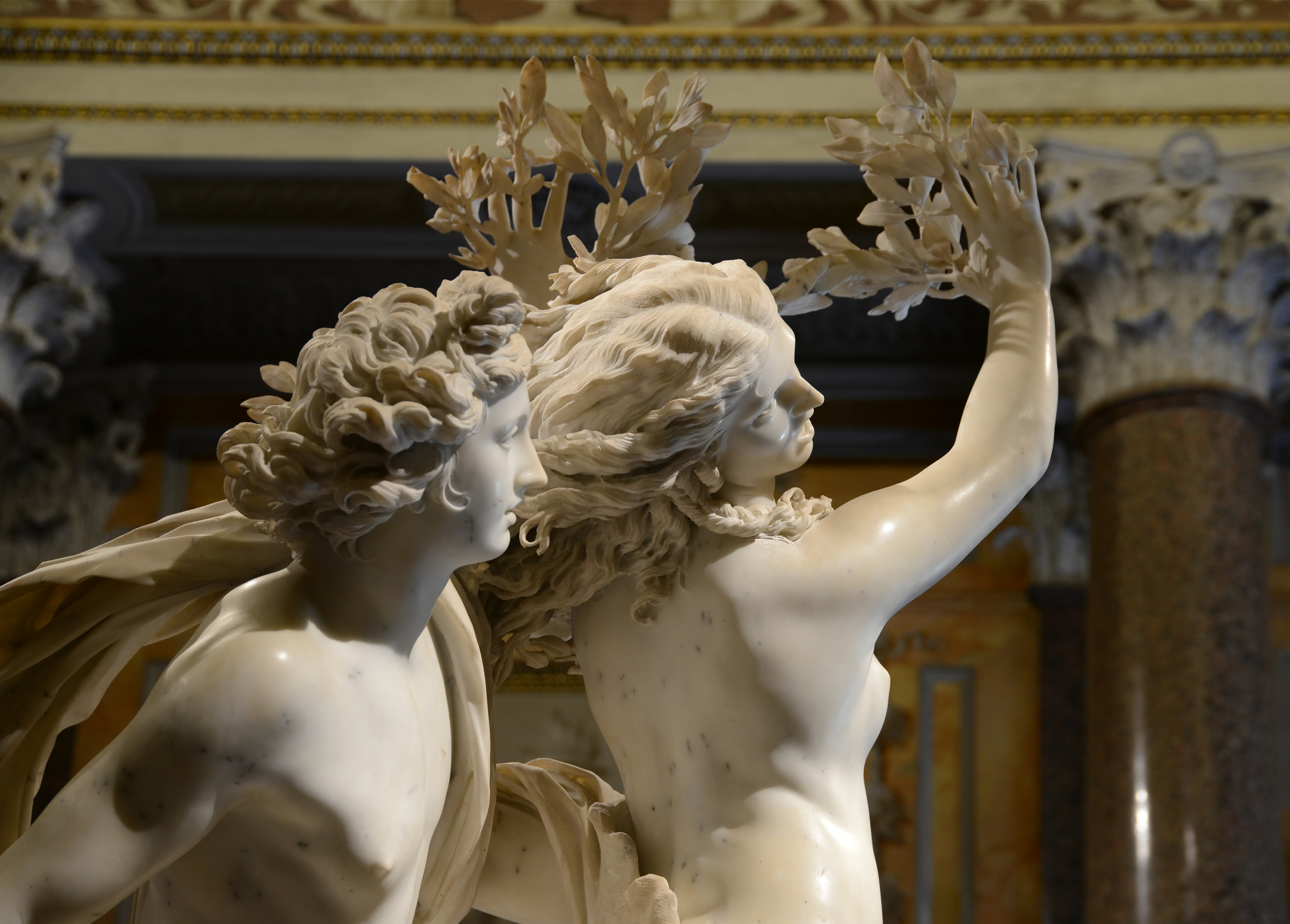
Apollo and Daphne by Bernini (detail). Galleria Borgese, Roma

The Ministry logo is inspired by the face of Apollo, in the famous sculptural group of Apollo and Daphne by Bernini kept at the Borghese Gallery.
