= Corriere dell'Umbria =

Regional daily newspaper in Umbria, Italy

The Corriere dell'Umbria (lit. 'Courier of Umbria') is the main regional daily newspaper of Umbria. The paper was first published on 18 May 1983. Its publisher is Gruppo Corriere.
