= 2011 Italian local elections =

The 2011 Italian local elections were held on 15–16 May, with a second round on 29–30 May. In Italy, direct elections were held in all 1,177 municipalities and 11 provinces: in each municipality (comune) were chosen mayor and members of the City Council, in each province were chosen president and members of the Provincial Council. Of the 1,177 municipalities, 30 were provincial capital municipalities and only 105 had a population higher than 15,000 inhabitants.

In Sicily the elections were held on 29–30 May, with a second round on 12–13 June.

Citizens living in Italy who were 18 or over on election day were entitled to vote in the local council elections. The deadline for voters to register to vote in the 15–16 May elections was midday on Saturday 15 April 2011.

== Voting System ==
The voting system is used for all mayoral elections in Italy, in the city with a population higher than 15,000. Under this system voters express a direct choice for the mayor or an indirect choice voting for the party of the candidate's coalition. If no candidate receives at least 50% of votes, the top two candidates go to a second round after two weeks. This gives a result whereby the winning candidate may be able to claim majority support, although it is not guaranteed.

The election of the City Council is based on a direct choice for the candidate with a preference vote: the candidate with the majority of the preferences is elected. The number of the seats for each party is determined proportionally.

== Municipal elections ==
Total voter turnout for the Municipal election on the first round was of 68.6%, on the second was of 60.1%.

=== Mayoral election results ===
Cities	Population	Incumbent mayor	Elected mayor	Seats
Novara	104,388	Silvana Moscatelli	Andrea Ballarè (PD)	19 / 32
Turin	883,281	Sergio Chiamparino (PD)	Piero Fassino (PD)	24 / 40
Milan	1,380,873	Letizia Moratti (PdL)	Giuliano Pisapia (IND)	29 / 48
Varese	80,545	Attilio Fontana (LN)	Attilio Fontana (LN)	19 / 32
Rovigo	51,715	Fausto Merchiori (PD)	Bruno Piva (PdL)	18 / 32
Pordenone	51,156	Sergio Bolzonello (PD)	Claudio Pedrotti (PD)	24 / 40
Trieste	204,347	Roberto Dipiazza (PdL)	Roberto Cosolini (PD)	24 / 40
Savona	61,219	Federico Berruti (PD)	Federico Berruti (PD)	20 / 32
Bologna	386,386	Annamaria Cancellieri	Virginio Merola (PD)	22 / 36
Ravenna	153,740	Fabrizio Matteucci (PD)	Fabrizio Matteucci (PD)	19 / 32
Rimini	147,793	Alberto Ravaioli (PD)	Andrea Gnassi (PD)	19 / 32
Arezzo	99,487	Giuseppe Fanfani (PD)	Giuseppe Fanfani (PD)	19 / 32
Grosseto	82,041	Emilio Bonifazi (PD)	Emilio Bonifazi (PD)	19 / 32
Siena	53,901	Maurizio Cenni (PD)	Franco Ceccuzzi (PD)	21 / 32
Fermo	37,235	Saturnino Di Ruscio (PdL)	Nella Brambatti (PD)	19 / 32
Latina	117,892	Guido Nardone	Giovanni Di Giorgi (PdL)	21 / 32
Benevento	63,489	Fausto Pepe (PD)	Fausto Pepe (PD)	19 / 32
Caserta	79,640	Nicodemo Petteruti (PD)	Pio Del Gaudio (PdL)	21 / 32
Naples	980,716	Rosa Russo Iervolino (PD)	Luigi de Magistris (IdV)	29 / 48
Salerno	140,608	Vincenzo De Luca (PD)	Vincenzo De Luca (PD)	22 / 32
Barletta	94,477	Nicola Maffei (PD)	Nicola Maffei (PD)	21 / 32
Catanzaro	89,801	Rosario Olivo (PD)	Michele Traversa (PdL)	26 / 32
Cosenza	69,911	Salvatore Perugini (PD)	Mario Occhiuto (PdL)	19 / 32
Crotone	63,923	Peppino Vallone (PD)	Peppino Vallone (PD)	19 / 32
Reggio Calabria	181,454	Giuseppe Raffa (PdL)	Demetrio Arena (PdL)	22 / 32
Ragusa	73,694	Nello Dipasquale (PdL)	Nello Dipasquale (PdL)	19 / 30
Cagliari	154,400	Emilio Floris (PdL)	Massimo Zedda (SEL)	16 / 40
Carbonia	28,265	Salvatore Cherchi (PD)	Giuseppe Casti (PD)	27 / 40
Iglesias	26,784	Pierluigi Carta (PD)	Luigi Perseu (PdL)	18 / 30
Olbia	60,261	Gianni Giovannelli (PdL)	Gianni Giovannelli (IND)	24 / 40

=== Party results ===
Party votes in 29 provincial capital municipalities:

Party	Votes	%
Democratic Party	701,935	26.2
The People of Freedom	597,203	22.8
Northern League	150,194	5.6
Left Ecology Freedom	131,219	4.6
Union of the Centre	121,103	4.2
Italy of Values	113,217	4.0
Five Star Movement	100,998	3.8
Totals with others	2,840,585	100

=== City councils ===
City	PD	PdL	LN	SEL	IdV	UDC	M5S	Others
Turin	16	7	3	2	2	1	1	4
Novara	16	6	4	3	0	0	0	0
Milan	20	11	4	3	1	0	0	6
Varese	6	10	9	1	0	1	0	1
Rovigo	7	11	5	0	0	0	1	3
Trieste	15	6	0	3	2	0	0	6
Pordenone	22	6	3	0	0	0	0	5
Savona	10	6	1	1	1	2	1	7
Bologna	17	6	3	4	1	0	2	0
Ravenna	15	4	2	1	1	0	2	4
Rimini	16	7	1	0	1	0	2	2
Arezzo	16	6	1	1	1	0	1	1
Grosseto	12	5	0	1	1	2	0	7
Siena	15	5	0	1	1	1	0	7
Fermo	11	5	0	2	1	2	0	7
Latina	8	11	0	0	1	2	0	9
Naples	4	7	0	0	15	1	0	18
Salerno	10	4	0	1	0	1	0	14
Benevento	10	2	0	0	1	2	0	15
Caserta	3	8	0	0	0	3	0	15
Barletta	10	6	0	2	2	0	0	10
Catanzaro	1	4	0	1	0	2	0	23
Cosenza	2	4	0	1	1	5	0	16
Crotone	9	2	0	3	3	1	0	13
Reggio Calabria	3	8	0	0	0	3	0	18
Ragusa	5	5	0	0	2	3	0	15
Cagliari	13	5	0	5	2	2	0	11
Olbia	8	11	0	1	2	1	0	16
Iglesias	18	5	0	2	0	4	0	8

== Provincial elections ==
Only 11 provinces were up for election. The elections was for a new provincial president and members of the Provincial Council. On the first round the total voter turnout was of 59.6%, on the second was of 45.2%. Below the results of each candidate and coalition on the first and second round.

=== President election results ===
Provinces	Incumbent president	Alliance	Elected president	Alliance
Vercelli	Renzo Masoero	Centre-right	Carlo Riva Vercellotti	Centre-right
Mantua	Maurizio Fontanili	Centre-left	Alessandro Pastacci	Centre-left
Pavia	Vittorio Poma	Centre-left	Daniele Bosone	Centre-left
Treviso	Leonardo Muraro	Centre-right	Leonardo Muraro	Centre-right
Gorizia	Enrico Gherghetta	Centre-left	Enrico Gherghetta	Centre-left
Trieste	Maria Teresa Bassa Poropat	Centre-left	Maria Teresa Bassa Poropat	Centre-left
Ravenna	Francesco Giangrandi	Centre-left	Claudio Casadio	Centre-left
Lucca	Stefano Baccelli	Centre-left	Stefano Baccelli	Centre-left
Macerata	Franco Capponi	Centre-right	Antonio Pettinari	Centre-left
Campobasso	Nicola D'Ascanio	Centre-left	Rosario De Matteis	Centre-right
Reggio Calabria	Giuseppe Morabito	Centre-left	Giuseppe Raffa	Centre-right

== See also ==
- 2011 Bologna municipal election
- 2011 Milan municipal election
