= 2006 Italian local elections =

A number of elections for the renewal of both municipal councils and mayors were held in Italy on 28 and 29 May 2006. Notably, these election regarded the four biggest cities in the country, Rome, Milan, Naples and Turin. Other relevant cities where municipal elections were held included Cagliari, Varese, Novara, Ravenna, Rimini, Ancona, Siena, Salerno and Catanzaro.

== Municipal elections ==
Cities	Incumbent mayor	Coalition	Elected mayor	Coalition	Details
Ancona	Fabio Sturani	Centre-left	Fabio Sturani	Centre-left	
Arezzo	Luigi Lucherini	Centre-right	Giuseppe Fanfani	Centre-left	
Barletta	Francesco Salerno	Centre-left	Nicola Maffei	Centre-left	
Belluno	Ermano De Col	Centre-left	Celeste Bortoluzzi	Centre-right	
Benevento	Sandro Nicola D'Alessandro	Centre-right	Fausto Pepe	Centre-left	
Cagliari	Emilio Floris	Centre-right	Emilio Floris	Centre-right	
Carbonia	Salvatore Cherchi	Centre-left	Salvatore Cherchi	Centre-left	
Caserta	Luigi Falco	Centre-right	Paolino Maddaloni	Centre-right	
Catanzaro	Sergio Abramo	Centre-right	Giuseppe Franco Cimino	Centre-left	
Cosenza	Eva Catizone	Centre-left	Salvatore Perugini	Centre-left	
Crotone	Pasquale Senatore	Centre-right	Peppino Vallone	Centre-left	
Fermo	Saturnino Di Ruscio	Centre-right	Saturnino Di Ruscio	Centre-right	
Grosseto	Alessandro Antichi	Centre-right	Emilio Bonifazi	Centre-left	
Lecco	Lorenzo Bodega	Centre-right	Antonella Faggi	Centre-right	
Milan	Gabriele Albertini	Centre-right	Letizia Moratti	Centre-right	Detail
Naples	Rosa Russo Iervolino	Centre-left	Rosa Russo Iervolino	Centre-left	
Novara	Massimo Giordano	Centre-right	Massimo Giordano	Centre-right	
Pordenone	Sergio Bolzonello	Centre-left	Sergio Bolzonello	Centre-left	
Ragusa	Antonino Solarino	Centre-left	Nello Dipasquale	Centre-right	
Ravenna	Vidimer Mercatali	Centre-left	Fabrizio Matteucci	Centre-left	
Rimini	Alberto Ravaioli	Centre-left	Alberto Ravaioli	Centre-left	
Rome	Walter Veltroni	Centre-left	Walter Veltroni	Centre-left	Detail
Rovigo	Paolo Avezzù	Centre-right	Paolo Avezzù	Centre-right	
Salerno	Mario Pasquale De Biase	Centre-left	Vincenzo De Luca	Centre-left	
Savona	Carlo Ruggeri	Centre-left	Federico Berruti	Centre-left	
Siena	Maurizio Cenni	Centre-left	Maurizio Cenni	Centre-left	
Turin	Sergio Chiamparino	Centre-left	Sergio Chiamparino	Centre-left	
Trieste	Roberto Dipiazza	Centre-right	Roberto Dipiazza	Centre-right	
Varese	Aldo Luigi Fumagalli	Centre-right	Attilio Fontana	Centre-right	

== Provincial elections ==
Provinces	Incumbent president	Coalition	Elected president	Coalition
Mantua	Maurizio Fontanili	Centre-left	Maurizio Fontanili	Centre-left
Pavia	Silvio Beretta	Centre-right	Vittorio Poma	Centre-left
Treviso	Luca Zaia	Northern League	Leonardo Muraro	Centre-right
Gorizia	Giorgio Brandolin	Centre-left	Enrico Gherghetta	Centre-right
Trieste	Fabio Scoccimarro	Centre-right	Maria Teresa Bassa Poropat	Centre-left
Udine	Marzio Strassoldo	Centre-right	Marzio Strassoldo	Centre-right
Imperia	Giovanni Giuliano	Centre-right	Giovanni Giuliano	Centre-right
Ravenna	Francesco Giangrandi	Centre-left	Francesco Giangrandi	Centre-left
Lucca	Andrea Tagliasacchi	Centre-left	Stefano Baccelli	Centre-left
Campobasso	Augusto Massa	Centre-left	Nicola D'Ascanio	Centre-left
Reggio Calabria	Pietro Fuda	Centre-right	Giuseppe Morabito	Centre-left
Trapani	Giulia Adamo	Centre-right	Antonio D'Alì	Centre-right
