= Persiani =

Persiani is an Italian surname. Notable people with the surname include:

- Fanny Tacchinardi Persiani (1812–1867), an Italian soprano singer.
- Francesco Persiani (born 1965), an Italian politician.
- Giuseppe Persiani (1799–1869), an Italian opera composer.
- Luca Persiani (1984–2024), an Italian racing driver.
- Mauro Persiani (born 1956), a retired Italian professional football player.
