= Pierluigi Piccini =

Italian politician

Mayor of Siena
- In office 29 November 1990 – 14 May 2001
- Preceded by: Vittorio Mazzoni della Stella
- Succeeded by: Maurizio Cenni

Personal details
- Born: 10 November 1952 (age 73) Rome, Lazio, Italy
- Party: Italian Communist Party (till 1991); Democratic Party of the Left (1991-1998); Democrats of the Left (1998-2004); Independent (2004-2018)
- Education: University of Siena
- Profession: employee

Pierluigi Piccini (born 10 November 1952 in Rome) is an Italian politician.

== Biography ==
Piccini started his political career as a municipal councillor for the Italian Communist Party in Siena in 1988. He was elected Mayor of Siena on 29 November 1990 after the resignation of mayor Vittorio Mazzoni della Stella. He joined the Democratic Party of the Left in 1991 and was re-elected on 21 June 1993. He ran for a new term at the 1997 Italian local elections and was confirmed as Mayor of Siena on 28 April 1997.

He was expelled from the Democrats of the Left in 2004. He ran again for the office of mayor as an independent, supported by local civic lists, in 2006 and in 2018, failing both elections.

== See also ==
- 1993 Italian local elections
- 1997 Italian local elections
- 2006 Italian local elections
- 2018 Italian local elections
- List of mayors of Siena

Political offices
Preceded by Vittorio Mazzoni della Stella	Mayor of Siena; 1990–2001	Succeeded by Maurizio Cenni
