= Correnti =

Correnti is an Italian surname. Notable people with the surname include:

- Cesare Correnti (1815–1888), Italian revolutionary and politician
- Giovanni Correnti (1940–2016), Italian lawyer and politician
- Maria Cristina Correnti (born 1972), Italian women's basketball player
