= Maria Rita Schembari =

Italian politician (born 1969)

President of the Free Municipal Consortium of Ragusa
- Incumbent
- Assumed office 28 April 2025
- Preceded by: Office established

Mayor of Comiso
- Incumbent
- Assumed office 27 June 2018
- Preceded by: Filippo Spataro

Personal details
- Born: Maria Rita Annunziata Schembari; 1 January 1969 (age 57) Comiso, Province of Ragusa, Italy
- Party: Brothers of Italy
- Education: University of Catania
- Profession: Teacher

Maria Rita Annunziata Schembari (born 1 January 1969) is an Italian politician and teacher who has served as president of the Free Municipal Consortium of Ragusa since 2025 and as mayor of Comiso since 2018. She is the first woman to serve as mayor of Comiso.

== Life and career ==
Schembari was born in Comiso, Sicily, in 1969. She graduated from the University of Catania with a degree in literature in 1993 and worked as a secondary-school teacher of literature and Latin. From 2008 to 2013, she served as a municipal assessor for education and culture in Comiso, and from 2013 to 2018 she was leader of the opposition group on the municipal council.

In the 2018 municipal elections, Schembari was elected mayor of Comiso in the runoff, defeating incumbent centre-left candidate Filippo Spataro with 7,352 votes (50.2%). She was re-elected for a second term in 2023, receiving 10,519 votes (74.10%), against the centre-left candidate Salvatore Liuzzo. Her coalition included Brothers of Italy and two civic lists.

In April 2025, Schembari was elected president of the Free Municipal Consortium of Ragusa, the Sicilian local government body that replaced the former province. She received 46.80% of the weighted vote and was supported by Brothers of Italy, Forza Italia, and civic candidates. She thus became the first president of the new provincial body following the period of administration by commissioners.
