= 1993 Italian local elections =

The 1993 Italian local elections were held on 6 June (with runoffs on 20 June) and 21 November (with runoffs on 5 December). They were the first elections conducted after the introduction of the direct election of mayors and presidents of provinces, a reform that brought a semi-presidential model to the local level (Law 25 March 1993, no. 81).

Alongside the democratic election of the heads of local administrations, the electoral system was also modified. A majority bonus was introduced, granting 3/5 of council seats to the coalition supporting the winning candidate in both municipal and provincial elections. In smaller municipalities – whose threshold was significantly raised to 15,000 inhabitants – a form of group alignment was introduced for the first time, albeit through civic lists. In these municipalities, the electoral system provided for a two-thirds majority bonus and a single-round vote. The overall number of councillors was also reduced; because councillors’ roles were separated from those of executive officials (assessori), municipal and provincial executives were effectively institutionally separated from the councils.

It proved difficult to establish a clear hierarchy among political parties on the basis of the election results, as numerous ad hoc labels and civic lists were attached to the coalitions supporting individual candidates. At a general level, the first round of the June elections revealed the strong performance of the Northern League (LN) in northern Italy, where it obtained around 40% of the vote in Milan. The Democratic Party of the Left (PDS) and the Communist Refoundation Party (PRC) remained relatively stable—losing fewer votes than the Christian Democrats – while the Italian Socialist Party (PSI) virtually disappeared. In Milan, where it had been a central actor in public life for nearly a century, the PSI failed to elect even a single municipal councillor.

In the rest of the country, the former communist forces achieved considerable support, partly due to their ability to build effective electoral alliances. Centrist lists, by contrast, generally failed to reach the runoff stage, largely because of internal divisions. The centrist electorate therefore became decisive in the second rounds, both in contests between the Northern League and left-wing coalitions and in races between two left-leaning candidates. One notable example occurred in Turin, where the Northern League narrowly missed the runoff by 5,013 votes.

The autumn electoral round confirmed the success of left-wing coalitions, which prevailed in major cities including Genoa, Rome, Naples, Palermo, Trieste, and Venice. In areas where the Northern League was absent – particularly in central and southern Italy – the Italian Social Movement (MSI) achieved significant gains. The party benefited from the fact that it was largely untouched by the Mani pulite corruption investigations, and from the fragmentation of the political centre, especially the decline of the Christian Democracy (DC), which led many moderate voters to view the far-right party as preferable to the left.

In several large cities, political outsiders were elected as mayors: in Genoa a magistrate, in Trieste a businessman, and in Venice a philosopher. Elsewhere, mayors were elected who had never previously held national government office, such as in Rome and Naples. Particularly notable was the victory of Leoluca Orlando in Palermo, who won 75% of the vote in the first round.

Among provincial capitals, there were 17 victories for coalitions centred on the PDS and one for the PSI. Reformist or civic-oriented alliances won three contests, the Northern League secured eight, a local right-wing coalition won one, and the MSI obtained two victories, in addition to two further mayors elected under “lame duck” conditions (anatra zoppa, where the mayor lacks a supporting council majority).

In provincial elections, there were four victories for coalitions led by the PDS, four for the Northern League, and one province won by a local party.

== Voting system ==
The semipresidential voting system was the one used for all mayoral elections in Italy of cities with a population higher than 15,000. Under this system voters express a direct choice for the mayor or an indirect choice voting for the party of the candidate's coalition. If no candidate receives at least 50% of votes, the top two candidates go to a run-off after two weeks. The winning candidate obtains a majority bonus equal to 60% of seats in the City Council.

The election of the City Council is based on a direct choice for the candidate with a preference vote: the candidate with the majority of the preferences is elected. The number of the seats for each losing party is determined proportionally, using D'Hondt seat allocation. Only coalitions with more than 3% of votes are eligible to get any seats.

== Municipal elections ==
=== Mayoral election results ===
Alliance of Progressives (PDS and allies)
Italian Social Movement (MSI)
Italian Socialist Party (PSI)
Northern League (LN)
Southern Action League (LAM)
Centrist coalition (DC and allies)
Civic lists

Region	City	Incumbent mayor	Elected mayor	1st round		2nd round		Seats	Source
Region	City	Incumbent mayor	Elected mayor	Votes	%	Votes	%	Seats	Source
June elections
Piedmont	Novara	Antonio Malerba (PSI)	Sergio Merusi (LN)	17,684	25.73	31,392	51.62	24 / 40	
Piedmont	Turin	Giovanna Cattaneo Incisa (PRI)	Valentino Castellani (Ind)	121,517	20.33	280,092	57.32	30 / 50	
Piedmont	Vercelli	Fulvio Bodo (PSI)	Mietta Baracchi (LN)	9,100	26.16	16,926	56.62	24 / 40	
Lombardy	Milan	Giampiero Borghini (PSI)	Marco Formentini (LN)	346,537	38.82	452,868	57.08	36 / 50	
Lombardy	Lecco	Guido Boscagli (DC)	Giuseppe Pogliani (LN)	11,535	36.22	14,602	56.30	24 / 40	
Lombardy	Pavia	Alessandro Cantone (DC)	Rodolfo Jannaccone (LN)	22,930	43.19	29,572	64.42	24 / 40	
Veneto	Belluno	Gianclaudio Bressa (DC)	Maurizio Fistarol (PDS)	7,453	30.81	11,593	54.68	24 / 40	
Friuli-Venezia Giulia	Pordenone	Alvaro Cardin (DC)	Alfredo Pasini (LN)	7,977	23.19	17,782	57.04	24 / 40	
Emilia-Romagna	Ravenna	Giovanni Miserocchi (PDS)	Pier Paolo D'Attorre (PDS)	37,421	38.92	48,711	55.92	24 / 40	
Tuscany	Grosseto	Loriano Valentini (PDS)	Loriano Valentini (PDS)	18,398	38.17	23,836	52.81	24 / 40	
Tuscany	Siena	Pierluigi Piccini (PDS)	Pierluigi Piccini (PDS)	15,123	37.80	18,667	55.95	24 / 40	
Umbria	Terni	Mario Todini (PSI)	Gianfranco Ciaurro (Ind)	14,840	20.77	33,702	50.16	24 / 40	
Marche	Ancona	Franco Del Mastro (PSI)	Renato Galeazzi (PDS)	31,873	46.46	42,057	71.49	24 / 40	
Sicily	Agrigento	Giovanni Roberto Di Mauro (DC)	Calogero Sodano (PRI)	9,791	31.29	15,041	50.73	9 / 40	
Sicily	Catania	Angelo Lo Presti (PSDI)	Enzo Bianco (AD)	76,025	40.43	81,326	52.11	17 / 60	
November elections
Piedmont	Alessandria	Gianluca Veronesi (PSI)	Francesca Calvo (LN)	21,262	33.52	30,797	53.23	24 / 40	
Lombardy	Lodi	Marco Magrini (DC)	Alberto Segalini (LN)	11,590	37.77	16,113	61.15	24 / 40	
Veneto	Venice	Ugo Bergamo (DC)	Massimo Cacciari (PDS)	89,034	42.29	107,497	55.37	28 / 46	
Friuli-Venezia Giulia	Trieste	Giulio Staffieri (LpT)	Riccardo Illy (Ind)	59,931	39.84	72,939	53.02	24 / 40	
Liguria	Genoa	Alfio Lamanna (PRI)	Adriano Sansa (PDS)	189,874	42.93	247,547	59.17	30 / 50	
Liguria	La Spezia	Flavio Luigi Bertone (PDS)	Roberto Lucio Rosaia (AD)	19,186	28.62	30,145	53.63	24 / 40	
Marche	Macerata	Carlo Cingolani (DC)	Gian Mario Maulo (PDS)	8,458	29.94	14,838	58.84	24 / 40	
Lazio	Latina	Maurizio Mansutti (DC)	Ajmone Finestra (MSI)	21,092	30.40	37,870	57.46	24 / 40	
Lazio	Rome	Franco Carraro (PSI)	Francesco Rutelli (FdV)	684,529	39.55	955,859	53.11	36 / 60	
Abruzzo	Chieti	Andrea Buracchio (DC)	Nicola Cucullo (MSI)	15,851	42.60	20,354	57.69	24 / 40	
Abruzzo	Pescara	Giuseppe Ciccantelli (DC)	Mario Collevecchio (PDS)	32,790	42.03	40,804	60.61	24 / 40	
Campania	Benevento	Raffaele Verdicchio (DC)	Pasquale Viespoli (MSI)	13,339	31.42	27,975	71.49	6 / 40	
Campania	Caserta	Giuseppe Gasparin (DC)	Aldo Bulzoni (PDS)	18,096	40.77	28,395	76.01	24 / 40	
Campania	Naples	Francesco Tagliamonte (DC)	Antonio Bassolino (PDS)	229,649	41.62	300,964	55.65	36 / 60	
Campania	Salerno	Vincenzo De Luca (PDS)	Vincenzo De Luca (PDS)	22,620	23.71	48,154	57.91	24 / 40	
Apulia	Taranto	Roberto Della Torre (DC)	Giancarlo Cito (LAM)	39,555	30.33	61,281	52.60	24 / 40	
Calabria	Cosenza	Pietro Minutolo (DC)	Giacomo Mancini (PSI)	8,297	18.04	21,601	58.58	24 / 40	
Sicily	Palermo	Manlio Orobello (PSI)	Leoluca Orlando (LR)	291,976	75.18	—	—	32 / 50	
Sicily	Caltanissetta	Aldo Giarratano (DC)	Giuseppe Mancuso (MSI)	13,146	34.10	18,850	51.66	4 / 30	

=== Overall parties results ===
Party	Leader	%
Christian Democracy (DC)	Mino Martinazzoli	18.6%
Northern League (LN)	Umberto Bossi	15.8%
Democratic Party of the Left (PDS)	Achille Occhetto	11.6%
Communist Refoundation Party (PRC)	Sergio Garavini	7.5%
Italian Social Movement (MSI)	Gianfranco Fini	5.5%
The Network (Rete)	Leoluca Orlando	3.2%
Italian Socialist Party (PSI)	Ottaviano Del Turco	2.8%
Federation of the Greens (FdV)	Carlo Ripa di Meana	1.7%
Italian Republican Party (PRI)	Giorgio La Malfa	1.5%
Italian Democratic Socialist Party (PSDI)	Carlo Vizzini	1.4%
Source: La rivoluzione nelle urne

== Provincial elections ==
=== Presidential election results ===
Alliance of Progressives (PDS and allies)
Northern League (LN)
List for Trieste (LpT)

Region	Province	Incumbent president	Elected president	1st round		2nd round		Seats
Region	Province	Incumbent president	Elected president	Votes	%	Votes	%	Seats
June elections
Lombardy	Mantua	Massimo Chiaventi (PDS)	Davide Boni (LN)	80,175	32.9	112,200	53.2	18 / 30
Lombardy	Pavia	Tullio Montagna (PDS)	Enzo Casali (LN)		43.3		70.3	18 / 30
Friuli-Venezia Giulia	Trieste	Dario Crozzoli (PSI)	Paolo Sardos Albertini (LpT)		18.7		50.7	14 / 24
Friuli-Venezia Giulia	Gorizia	Gino Saccavini (PSI)	Monica Marcolini (LN)	22,132	22.2		?	14 / 24
Emilia-Romagna	Ravenna	Dante Maioli (PSI)	Gabriele Albonetti (PDS)	89,363	37.33	128,465	60.67	18 / 30
Lazio	Viterbo	Rosato Rosati (DC)	Ugo Nardini (PDS)	48,690	28.07		?	14 / 24
November elections
Lombardy	Varese	Maria Fiorina Ripamonti (PDS)	Massimo Ferrario (LN)		49.3		?	22 / 36
Liguria	Genoa	Franco Rolandi (PSI)	Marta Vincenzi (PDS)		31.5		?	22 / 36
Liguria	La Spezia	Stefano Sgorbini (PDS)	Stefano Sgorbini (PDS)		36.5		55.0	14 / 24

== See also ==
- 1993 Milan municipal election
- 1993 Rome municipal election
