= Monica Barni =

Italian linguist, academic and politician (born 1961)

Vice president of Tuscany
- In office 10 August 2015 – 8 October 2020
- President: Enrico Rossi
- Preceded by: Stefania Saccardi
- Succeeded by: Stefania Saccardi

Regional assessor for culture, university and research of Tuscany
- In office 10 August 2015 – 8 October 2020
- President: Enrico Rossi

Rector of the Università per Stranieri di Siena
- In office 1 November 2013 – 10 August 2015
- Preceded by: Massimo Vedovelli
- Succeeded by: Pietro Cataldi

Personal details
- Born: 5 April 1961 (age 65) Siena, Italy
- Parent: Mauro Barni (father)
- Education: University of Siena

Monica Barni (born 5 April 1961) is an Italian linguist and academic specializing in language teaching, sociolinguistics, language assessment, and linguistic rights. She is full professor of modern language teaching at the Università per Stranieri di Siena, where she served as rector from 2013 to 2015. She also served as vice president of Tuscany in the second regional government led by Enrico Rossi.

== Early life and education ==
Barni was born in Siena to Mauro Barni, an academic who served as rector of the University of Siena, mayor of Siena, and founding rector of the Università per Stranieri di Siena.

She graduated in humanities in 1984 from the University of Siena. She initially worked in secondary education. In 1992, the year of its establishment, she joined the CILS (Certificazione di Italiano come Lingua Straniera) at the Università per Stranieri di Siena, a centre responsible for the certification of Italian as a foreign language.

== Academic career ==
In 2002, Barni became a researcher in philosophy and theory of language. In 2006 she was appointed associate professor in modern language teaching, becoming full professor in 2010. She served as rector of the Università per Stranieri di Siena from 1 November 2013 to 10 August 2015.

She has served as director of the CILS certification centre (2004–2013), vice-dean of the Faculty of Italian language and culture (2006–2013), member of the Academic Senate and board of administration, and delegate of the rector for research (2004–2013) and teacher education (2009–2013).

Barni was a member of the Council of Europe expert group involved in the pilot project for the Manual for Relating Language Examinations to the Common European Framework of Reference for Languages.

== Political activity ==
From 2015 to 2020, Barni served in the regional government of Tuscany. She was vice president and regional assessor for culture, university and research from 10 August 2015 to 8 October 2020, appointed by president Enrico Rossi with Decree no. 135 of 30 July 2015.

During the same period, she also served as member of the National Council for Development Cooperation (CNCS), coordinator for university within the 9th Commission (education, labour, innovation and research) of the Conference of Regions and Autonomous Provinces.
