= Eraldo Botta =

Italian politician (born 1968)

President of the Province of Vercelli
- In office 13 October 2019 – 24 July 2022
- Preceded by: Carlo Riva Vercellotti
- Succeeded by: Davide Gilardino

Mayor of Varallo
- In office 16 May 2012 – 12 June 2022
- Preceded by: Gianluca Buonanno
- Succeeded by: Pietro Bondetti

Personal details
- Born: 9 January 1968 (age 58) Basel, Switzerland
- Party: Lega Nord; Lega

Eraldo Botta (born 9 January 1968) is an Italian politician who served as president of the Province of Vercelli from 2019 to 2022.

== Life and career ==
Born in Basel, Switzerland, he grew up in Valsesia, province of Vercelli, Italy. He graduated from a technical surveying institute and worked as a manager and executive in the car dealership sector.

In 2002, he was elected to the municipal council of Varallo, where he also served as an assessor. In 2012, he was elected mayor of Varallo and was re-elected in 2017. In October 2019, Botta was elected president of the Province of Vercelli as the centre-right candidate, supported by Lega Nord.

In the 2024 European Parliament election, Botta stood as a candidate for the Lega in the North-West Italy constituency. He received 1,514 preference votes but was not elected.

From 2022 to 2026, he served as deputy mayor of Varallo, with responsibility for the budget, taxation, urban planning, public works, European funds, associations, local affairs, and communications. On 17 June 2026, mayor Pietro Bondetti removed Botta from his position as deputy mayor and revoked his executive responsibilities, citing significant political differences and a breakdown in institutional trust.
