= Fazio Fabbrini =

Italian politician (1926–2018)

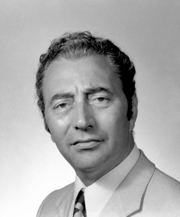

Member of European Parliament
- In office October 1970 – 1976

Member of the Senate of Italy
- In office May 20, 1968 – 1976

Mayor of Siena
- In office January 25, 1965 – July 19, 1966
- Preceded by: Ugo Bartalini
- Succeeded by: Canzio Vannini

Personal details
- Born: February 5, 1926 Abbadia San Salvatore, Italy
- Died: December 10, 2018 (aged 92) Siena, Italy
- Party: Communist Party of Italy

Military service
- Allegiance: National Liberation Committee
- Years of service: 1944-1945
- Unit: Garibaldi Brigades
- Battles/wars: Italian Civil War

Fazio Fabbrini (5 February 1926 – 10 December 2018) was an Italian politician who served as a Senator (1968–1976) and the Mayor of Siena (1965–1966).

== Biography ==
Fabbrini was born in Abbadia San Salvatore, Italy in 1926. His father, Alessandro, was a member of the Communist Party of Italy. During the Italian Civil War, Fabbrini was a anti-fascist partisan, participating in combat against the government of Benito Mussolini. After the war, he continued to remain involved in anti-fascist politics with the Communist Party.

During the Ninth National Congress of the Communist Party of Italy, in 1962, Fabbrini was elected to the Central Committee of the party, a post he held until 1970.

Fabbrini served as Mayor of Siena between January 1965 and July 1966.

In 1968, he became a member of the Italian Senate. Subsequently, he was selected by the Senate to be a Member of European Parliament. As an MEP, Fabbrini was outspoken on several issues, particularly against corruption and bribery.

He left politics in 1976, and died in Siena in 2018, aged 92.
