= Davide Gilardino =

Italian politician (born 1977)

President of the Province of Vercelli
- Incumbent
- Assumed office 24 July 2022
- Preceded by: Eraldo Botta

Mayor of Ronsecco
- Incumbent
- Assumed office 22 June 2017
- In office 14 June 2004 – 25 May 2014

Personal details
- Born: 5 June 1977 (age 49) Vercelli, Piedmont, Italy

Davide Gilardino (born 5 June 1977) is an Italian politician serving as president of the Province of Vercelli since 2022. He has served as mayor of Ronsecco since 2017.

Gilardino was first elected mayor of Ronsecco in 2004, and re-confirmed in 2009. In 2022, Gilardino, backed by the centre-right coalition, was elected president of the Province of Vercelli with 75.4% of the weighted vote, defeating Lorenzo Gozzi, the centre-left candidate. He was re-elected in 2026, supported by the cross-party list La Casa dei Comuni.
