= Università per Stranieri di Siena =

Italian universities oriented towards study by foreign students

Coordinates: 43.3192°N 11.3325°E

- Type: State-supported
- Established: 1917
- Rector: Tomaso Montanari
- Location: Siena, Italy
- Website: unistrasi.it

The Università per Stranieri di Siena is a university in Siena, in Tuscany in central Italy. It is one of the three universities historically for foreign students in Italy, together with the Università per Stranieri di Perugia, and Università per stranieri "Dante Alighieri" di Reggio Calabria.

The institution was founded in 1917 as a school of Italian language and culture for foreign students. In 1992 it was legally recognized as a university and opened its enrolment to Italian students as well.

== Rectors ==
- Mauro Barni (1992–1996)
- Pietro Trifone (1996–2004)
- Massimo Vedovelli (2004–2013)
- Monica Barni (2013–2015)
- Pietro Cataldi (2015–2021)
- Tomaso Montanari (2021–present)
