= Franco Antoci =

Italian politician (born 1947)

- Antoci in 1992

President of the Province of Ragusa
- In office 28 November 2001 – 18 May 2012
- Preceded by: Giovanni Mauro
- Succeeded by: Office abolished

Member of the Chamber of Deputies
- In office 18 April 1992 – 14 April 1994

Mayor of Ragusa
- In office 3 October 1988 – 5 November 1991
- Preceded by: Lorenzo Migliore
- Succeeded by: Corrado Roccaro
- In office 2 March 1985 – 26 June 1987
- Preceded by: Sebastiano Tumino
- Succeeded by: Raffaele Rizzone

Personal details
- Born: Giovanni Francesco Antoci; 28 January 1947 (age 79) Ragusa, Sicily, Italy
- Party: Christian Democracy; Italian People's Party; European Democracy; Union of the Centre; The People of Freedom
- Occupation: Engineer

Giovanni Francesco Antoci (born 28 January 1947), known as Franco Antoci, is an Italian politician and engineer. He served as mayor of Ragusa from 1985 to 1987 and from 1988 to 1991, as a member of the Chamber of Deputies from 1992 to 1994, and as president of the Province of Ragusa from 2001 to 2012.
