= Luigi De Mossi =

Italian politician and lawyer (born 1960)

Mayor of Siena
- In office 25 June 2018 – 19 June 2023
- Preceded by: Bruno Valentini
- Succeeded by: Nicoletta Fabio

Personal details
- Born: 13 January 1960 (age 66) Siena, Italy
- Party: Centre-right independent
- Children: 1 daughter
- Education: University of Siena
- Profession: lawyer

Luigi De Mossi (born 13 January 1960 in Siena) is an Italian politician and lawyer.

== Life and career ==
He ran for Mayor of Siena as an independent at the 2018 Italian local elections, supported by a centre-right coalition formed by Lega Nord, Forza Italia, Brothers of Italy and the civic list "Voltiamo Pagina". He was elected Mayor of Siena and took office on 25 June 2018.

He appeared as Jessica's lawyer in the film The Face of an Angel, directed by Michael Winterbottom.

== See also ==
- 2018 Italian local elections
- List of mayors of Siena

Political offices
| Preceded by Bruno Valentini | Mayor of Siena; 2018-2023 | Succeeded by Nicoletta Fabio |
