= List of presidents of the Province of Trieste =

President of the Province of Trieste
- Presidente della Provincia di Trieste
- Formation: 1929
- Final holder: Maria Teresa Bassa Poropat
- Abolished: 2016

The president of the Province of Trieste was the head of the provincial administration of Trieste, a local government authority in Friuli-Venezia Giulia, Italy.

The province was abolished as an administrative body by Regional Law no. 20 of 9 December 2016, which provided for the suppression of the provinces and the transfer of their functions to other local authorities. The last president, Maria Teresa Bassa Poropat, left office on 1 December 2016. On that date, Gianluca Dominutti was appointed extraordinary commissioner to manage the liquidation of the provincial administration and complete the transfer of its remaining assets, responsibilities and legal affairs. The province was replaced by a Regional Decentralization Entity (Ente di Decentramento Regionale), an administrative body headed by a director general.

The Province of Trieste is scheduled to be re-established on 1 January 2027, following the reform of the local government system of Friuli-Venezia Giulia which provides for the reintroduction of the provinces.

== List ==
=== Presidents of the Provincial Rectorate (1929–1945) ===
Nº	Portrait	Name	Term of office		Party
Nº	Portrait	Name	Start	End	Party
1		Piero Peri	1929	1937	National Fascist Party
2		Edmondo Oberti	1937	1943	National Fascist Party

=== Presidents of the Province (1956–2016) ===
No.	Portrait	Name	Term of office		Party
No.	Portrait	Name	Start	End	Party
		Ettore Gregoretti	26 July 1956	1960	Christian Democracy
		Giordano Delise	1960	1964	Christian Democracy
		Alberto Savona	1964	1970	Christian Democracy
		Michele Zanetti	1970	1977	Christian Democracy
		Lucio Ghersi	1977	1980	Italian Socialist Party
		Carlo Ventura	1980	1984	Italian Socialist Party
		Gianni Marchio	1984	1986	List for Trieste
		Dario Locchi	1986	1988	Christian Democracy
		Dario Crozzoli	17 October 1988	25 November 1991	Italian Socialist Party
		Dario Crozzoli	19 August 1992	24 August 1992	Italian Socialist Party
		Paolo Sardos Albertini	21 June 1993	28 July 1993	List for Trieste
–		Domenico Mazzurco (Prefectural commissioner)	28 July 1993	2 December 1996	—
		Renzo Codarin	2 December 1996	11 June 2001	Independent (centre-right)
		Fabio Scoccimarro	11 June 2001	26 April 2006	National Alliance
		Maria Teresa Bassa Poropat	26 April 2006	1 June 2011	Independent (centre-left)
		Maria Teresa Bassa Poropat	1 June 2011	1 December 2016	Independent (centre-left)
–		Gianluca Dominutti (Extraordinary commissioner)	1 December 2016	1 January 2021	—

=== Regional Decentralization Entity of Trieste (2020–present) ===
No.	Director general	Term of office	
No.	Director general	Start	End
–	Paolo Viola (Extraordinary commissioner)	1 April 2020	2 August 2023
1	Roberta Clericuzio	2 August 2023	Incumbent

== Sources ==
- "Storia amministrativa dell'ente". Ministero dell'Interno.
- D'Amelio, Diego (2010). "La Democrazia cristiana a Trieste. Organizzazione, classe dirigente e potere locale (1943-1966)". Università degli Studi di Trieste.
