= Nicoletta Fabio =

Italian politician

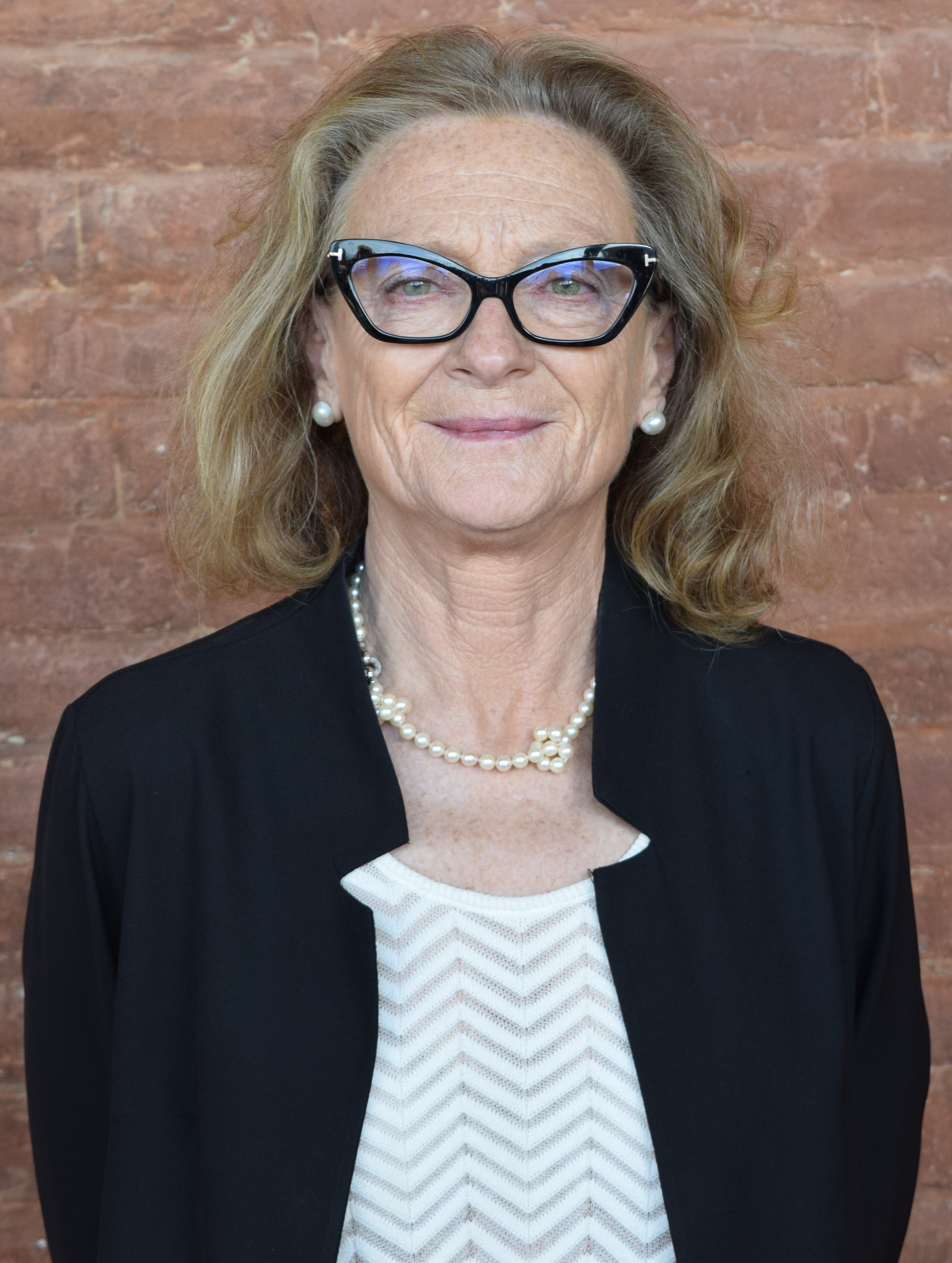

Mayor of Siena
- Incumbent
- Assumed office 19 June 2023
- Preceded by: Luigi De Mossi

Personal details
- Born: 13 March 1961 (age 65) Siena, Italy
- Party: Centre-right independent
- Education: University of Florence
- Profession: Teacher, journalist

Nicoletta Fabio (born 13 March 1961) is an Italian politician.

A centre-right independent, she serves as Mayor of Siena since 2023, the first woman to hold the office.

== Biography ==
From 1986 to 1988, Fabio was editor-in-chief of the Imago Moda magazine, published by the Edifir publishing house in Florence, for which she also edited some volumes in collaboration with the Centro Moda. After enrolling in the national register of publicist journalists in 1988, she was part of the editorial staff of Gift magazine, the company newspaper of the Florence Gift Mart in Florence, from 1989 to 2003, then continuing her journalistic activity until 2015.

From 1987 to 1992 she was a tenured teacher in lower secondary school and then moved on to a tenured teacher for Literature and Latin in high schools until her mayoral run in 2023.

=== Mayor of Siena ===
On 6 March 2023 the parties of the centre-right coalition officially presented Nicoletta Fabio as their candidate in view of the local elections.

In the first electoral round of May 14, 2023, she obtained 30.5% of the votes, against the candidate of the centre-left coalition Anna Ferretti, who instead obtained 28.8%, with which she goes to the ballot. Fabio won the second electoral round of 28–29 May, gaining 52.2%% of the preferences with 1,037 votes behind her challenger, becoming the first woman Mayor of Siena.

Political offices
Preceded by Luigi De Mossi	Mayor of Siena since 2023	Incumbent
