= Franco Ceccuzzi =

Italian politician (born 1967)

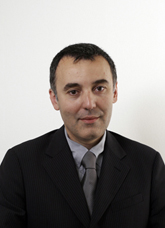
- Franco Ceccuzzi in 2018

Mayor of Siena
- In office 18 May 2011 – 12 June 2012
- Preceded by: Maurizio Cenni
- Succeeded by: Bruno Valentini

Member of the Chamber of Deputies
- In office 28 April 2006 – 14 March 2013
- Constituency: Tuscany

Personal details
- Born: 9 February 1967 (age 59) Montepulciano, Tuscany, Italy
- Party: Democrats of the Left (until 2007); Democratic Party (since 2007)

Franco Ceccuzzi (born 9 February 1967 in Montepulciano) is an Italian politician.

He was elected for the coalition L'Ulivo at the 2006 Italian general election, serving as member of the Chamber of Deputies for two legislatures (XV, XVI). He has been a member of the Democratic Party since 2007.

Ceccuzzi was elected Mayor of Siena on 18 May 2011. He resigned in May 2012 after an internal government crisis and was removed from office on 12 June 2012.

== See also ==
- 2006 Italian general election
- 2008 Italian general election
- 2011 Italian local elections
- List of mayors of Siena

Political offices
Preceded by Maurizio Cenni	Mayor of Siena; 2011–2012	Succeeded by Bruno Valentini
