= Mauro Barni =

Italian physician, professor, and politician

Mayor of Siena
- In office 31 July 1979 – 19 September 1983
- Preceded by: Canzio Vannini
- Succeeded by: Vittorio Mazzoni della Stella

Rector of the University of Siena
- In office 1970–1979
- Preceded by: Giovanni Domini
- Succeeded by: Adalberto Grossi

Rector of the Università per Stranieri di Siena
- In office 1992–1996
- Preceded by: Office established
- Succeeded by: Pietro Trifone

Personal details
- Born: 12 February 1927 Siena, Kingdom of Italy
- Died: 21 July 2017 (aged 90) Siena, Tuscany, Italy
- Party: Italian Socialist Party
- Children: Monica Barni
- Profession: Physician, professor

Mauro Barni (12 February 1927 – 21 July 2017) was an Italian physician, professor and politician.

Professor Barni was rector of the University of Siena from 1970 to 1979.

He served as mayor of Siena from 1979 to 1983. In 1992, he became the first rector of the Università per Stranieri di Siena.

== Bibliography ==
- Siena e la sua cultura nel mondo. Un omaggio dell'ateneo senese a Mauro Barni. Betti. 2006.

Political offices
Preceded by Canzio Vannini	Mayor of Siena; 1983–1990	Succeeded by Vittorio Mazzoni della Stella
