= Vittorio Mazzoni della Stella =

Italian politician

Mayor of Siena
- In office 20 September 1983 – 29 November 1990
- Preceded by: Mauro Barni
- Succeeded by: Pierluigi Piccini

Personal details
- Born: 21 May 1941 (age 85) Siena, Tuscany, Italy
- Party: Italian Socialist Party
- Education: University of Florence
- Profession: bank administrator, manager

Vittorio Mazzoni della Stella (born 21 May 1941 in Siena) is an Italian politician.

Member of the Italian Socialist Party, he was elected Mayor of Siena on 20 September 1983, and re-elected for a second term in 1988.

He worked as administrator for the bank Monte dei Paschi di Siena.

== See also ==
- List of mayors of Siena

Political offices
Preceded by Mauro Barni	Mayor of Siena; 1983–1990	Succeeded by Pierluigi Piccini
