= Carlo Marino =

Italian politician

Mayor of Caserta
- In office 21 June 2016 – 23 April 2025
- Preceded by: Pio Del Gaudio

Personal details
- Born: 19 October 1968 (age 57) Caserta, Italy
- Party: Democratic Party (since 2007)
- Education: University of Naples Federico II
- Profession: Lawyer

Carlo Marino (born 19 October 1968) is an Italian politician.

Former member of the center-right party Forza Italia, he joined the Democratic Party in 2007. He was elected mayor of Caserta on 19 June 2016 and took office on 21 June.

== Biography ==
After graduating in law from the University of Naples Federico II, in 1994 he began his legal career in Caserta, where he lives.

In 1997, he was elected city councilor and in 2000 he was appointed councilor for public works. In 2002, he was re-elected as a municipal councilor, coming first with more than 1,500 votes, and was again appointed councilor. In 2007, he was one of the founders of the Democratic Party (Italy) in the Province of Caserta, first becoming a member of the regional leadership of the PD and then Provincial President of the Guarantee Commission.

== See also ==
- 2016 Italian local elections
- List of mayors of Caserta

Political offices
Preceded by Pio Del Gaudio	Mayor of Caserta; 2016–2025	Succeeded by
