= Giuseppe Cassì =

Italian politician, lawyer and basketball player

Mayor of Ragusa
- Incumbent
- Assumed office 27 June 2018
- Preceded by: Federico Piccitto

Personal details
- Born: 11 April 1963 (age 63) Catania, Sicily, Italy
- Party: Right-wing independent
- Education: University of Catania
- Profession: lawyer, former professional basketball player

Giuseppe Cassì
Personal information
- Born: April 11, 1963 (age 63) Catania

Career information
- Playing career: 1986–1999
- Position: Shooting guard

Career history
- 1986–1989: Virtus Ragusa
- 1989–1993: Pallacanestro Trapani
- 1993–1999: Virtus Ragusa

Giuseppe Cassì (born 11 April 1963 in Catania) is an Italian politician, lawyer and former professional basketball player.

As a professional basketball player he played 13 seasons in Serie B, Serie A2 e Lega Basket Serie A for the Virtus Ragusa and Pallacanestro Trapani.

Cassì ran as an independent for the office of Mayor of Ragusa at the 2018 Italian local elections, supported by a right-wing coalition with Brothers of Italy and other civic lists. He won and took office on 27 June 2018.

== See also ==
- 2018 Italian local elections
- List of mayors of Ragusa

Political offices
| Preceded by Federico Piccitto | Mayor of Ragusa since 2018 | Succeeded by Incumbent |
