= List of presidents of the Province of Vercelli =

President of the Province of Vercelli
- Presidente della Provincia di Vercelli
- Incumbent; Davide Gilardino since 24 July 2022
- Term length: 4 years
- Formation: 1927

The president of the Province of Vercelli is the head of the provincial government in Vercelli, Piedmont, Italy. The president oversees the administration of the province, coordinates the activities of the municipalities, and represents the province in regional and national matters.

Since July 2022, the office has been held by Davide Gilardino of the centre-right coalition.

== List ==
=== Presidents of the Province (1951–present) ===
No.	Portrait	Name	Term of office		Party
No.	Portrait	Name	Start	End	Party
		?	?	?	?
		Raimondo Cantono	29 September 1986	9 August 1990	Christian Democracy
		Antonino Filiberti	9 August 1990	4 September 1991	Christian Democracy
		Gilberto Valeri	4 September 1991	8 May 1995	Democratic Party of the Left
		Gilberto Valeri	8 May 1995	28 June 1999	Democratic Party of the Left
		Giulio Baltaro	28 June 1999	17 July 2001	Forza Italia
		Renzo Masoero	11 June 2002	29 May 2007	National Alliance
		Renzo Masoero	29 May 2007	29 March 2010	National Alliance
		Leonardo Cerenzia (Prefectural commissioner)	29 March 2010	1 June 2011	—
		Carlo Riva Vercellotti	1 June 2011	11 September 2016	The People of Freedom; Forza Italia
		Carlo Riva Vercellotti	11 September 2016	9 August 2019	The People of Freedom; Forza Italia
		Eraldo Botta	13 October 2019	24 July 2022	Lega Nord
		Davide Gilardino	24 July 2022	28 July 2026	Independent (centre-right)
		Davide Gilardino	28 July 2026	Incumbent	Independent (centre-right)

== Sources ==
- "Storia amministrativa dell'ente". Ministero dell'Interno.
