= List of presidents of the Province of Ragusa =

President of the Province of Ragusa
- Presidente della Provincia di Ragusa; Presidente del Libero consorzio comunale di Ragusa
- Incumbent; Maria Rita Schembari since 28 April 2025
- Inaugural holder: Giuseppe Corallo
- Formation: 1927

The president of the Province of Ragusa was the head of the provincial administration of Ragusa, a local government authority in Sicily, Italy. Since 2025, the chairman of the provincial administration is the president of the Free Municipal Consortium (Libero consorzio comunale).

== List ==
=== Presidents of the Provincial Rectorate (1927–1943) ===
No.	Portrait	Name	Term of office		Party
No.	Portrait	Name	Took office	Left office	Party
–		Guglielmo Casale (Extraordinary commissioner)	16 January 1927	15 July 1928	National Fascist Party
–		Diodato Mangieri (Extraordinary commissioner)	16 July 1928	26 July 1928	National Fascist Party
–		Annibale Fergola (Extraordinary commissioner)	27 July 1928	1 June 1929	National Fascist Party
1		Giuseppe Corallo	2 June 1929	8 April 1932	National Fascist Party
–		Salvatore Azzaro (Prefectural commissioner)	9 April 1932	5 July 1932	National Fascist Party
–		Michele Gaglié (Prefectural commissioner)	6 July 1932	9 October 1932	National Fascist Party
–		Salvatore Azzaro (Prefectural commissioner)	10 October 1932	July 1933	National Fascist Party
2		Salvatore Spadola	July 1933	January 1937	National Fascist Party
3		Giorgio Turlà	January 1937	March 1940	National Fascist Party
4		Giovanni Arezzi	March 1940	November 1940	National Fascist Party
5		Dionisio Moltisanti	November 1940	December 1943	National Fascist Party

=== Presidents of the Provincial Deputation (1943–1947) ===
No.	Portrait	Name	Term of office		Party
No.	Portrait	Name	Took office	Left office	Party
–		Giovanni Lupis	December 1943	April 1947	Italian Socialist Party

=== Regional delegates (1947–1970) ===
No.	Portrait	Name	Term of office		Party
No.	Portrait	Name	Took office	Left office	Party
1		Innocenzo Marchese	April 1947	January 1950	
2		Salvatore Migliorisi	January 1950	July 1954	
3		Giambattista Schininà	July 1954	April 1959	
4		Claudio Arezzi	April 1959	February 1960	
5		Gaetano Battaglia	February 1960	May 1960	
(3)		Giambattista Schininà	May 1960	July 1962	
–		Renato Catalano (Regional commissioner)	July 1962	September 1964	–
–		Giuseppe La Rosa (Extraordinary commissioner)	September 1964	15 July 1968	–
–		Giuseppe Scifo (Extraordinary commissioner)	16 July 1968	17 June 1970	–

=== Presidents of the Province (1970–2012) ===
No.	Portrait	Name	Term of office		Party
No.	Portrait	Name	Took office	Left office	Party
1		Giuseppe Scifo	18 June 1970	22 July 1985	Christian Democracy
2		Emanuele Giudice	23 July 1985	24 March 1986	Christian Democracy
3		Sebastiano Giucastro	24 March 1986	24 February 1987	Christian Democracy
(2)		Emanuele Giudice	24 February 1987	4 May 1988	Christian Democracy
4		Giuseppe Sammito	4 May 1988	10 July 1989	Christian Democracy
5		Concetta Vindigni	10 July 1989	18 October 1991	Italian Socialist Party
6		Antonino Scivoletto	19 November 1991	24 September 1992	Italian Socialist Party
7		Vincenzo Manenti	21 November 1992	7 June 1993	Christian Democracy
8		Giuseppe Lonatica	2 August 1993	28 June 1994	Democratic Party of the Left
9		Giovanni Mauro	28 June 1994	27 May 1998	Forza Italia
9		Giovanni Mauro	27 May 1998	8 November 2000	Forza Italia
–		Fulvio Manno (Extraordinary commissioner)	8 November 2000	28 November 2001	—
10		Franco Antoci	28 November 2001	15 May 2007	Union of Christian and Centre Democrats
10		Franco Antoci	15 May 2007	18 May 2012	Union of Christian and Centre Democrats

=== Regional commissioners (2012–2025) ===
Name	Term of office	
Name	Start	End
Giovanni Scarso	18 May 2012	19 February 2014
Carmela Floreno	19 February 2014	3 November 2014
Girolamo Ganci	3 November 2014	1 December 2014
Dario Cartabellotta	1 December 2014	8 April 2015
Girolamo Ganci	8 April 2015	24 April 2015
Dario Cartabellotta	24 April 2015	30 January 2018
Salvatore Piazza	30 January 2018	15 September 2023
Patrizia Valenti	15 September 2023	28 April 2025

=== Presidents of the Free Municipal Consortium (2025–present) ===
No.	Portrait	Name	Term of office		Party
No.	Portrait	Name	Start	End	Party
1		Maria Rita Schembari	28 April 2025	Incumbent	Brothers of Italy

== Sources ==
- "Storia amministrativa dell'ente". Ministero dell'Interno.
- Antoci, Giovanni Francesco (November 2011). La Provincia di Ragusa (PDF). Ragusa: Provincia Regionale di Ragusa.
