= Giovanni Mauro (politician) =

Italian politician (born 1962)

Member of the Senate of the Republic
- In office 15 March 2013 – 22 March 2018
- In office 28 April 2006 – 28 April 2008

Member of the Chamber of Deputies
- In office 30 May 2001 – 27 April 2006

President of the Province of Ragusa
- In office 28 June 1994 – 8 November 2000
- Preceded by: Giuseppe Lonatica
- Succeeded by: Franco Antoci

Personal details
- Born: 22 June 1962 (age 64) Ragusa, Sicily, Italy
- Party: Christian Democracy (1985–95); Forza Italia (1994–2009); The People of Freedom (2009–11); Great South (2011–13); Forza Italia (since 2013)

Giovanni Mauro (born 22 June 1962) is an Italian politician who served as president of the Province of Ragusa from 1994 to 2000 and as a member of the Italian Parliament in both the Chamber of Deputies and the Senate.
