= Alessandro Volpi =

Italian politician and historian

Mayor of Massa
- In office 29 May 2013 – 26 June 2018
- Preceded by: Roberto Pucci
- Succeeded by: Francesco Persiani

Personal details
- Born: 4 December 1963 (age 62) Massa, Italy
- Party: Democratic Party
- Education: University of Pisa
- Profession: professor, historian

Alessandro Volpi (born 4 December 1963) is an Italian politician and historian.

He is a member of the Democratic Party and was elected mayor of Massa on 29 May 2013.

Volpi ran for a second term at the 2018 Italian local elections, but was defeated by the centre-right candidate Francesco Persiani

== See also ==
- 2013 Italian local elections
- 2018 Italian local elections
- List of mayors of Massa

Political offices
Preceded by Roberto Pucci	Mayor of Massa; 2013–2018	Succeeded by Francesco Persiani
