= List of mayors of Ragusa =

Mayor of Ragusa
- Sindaco di Ragusa
- Incumbent; Giuseppe Cassì since 27 June 2018
- Appointer: Popular election
- Term length: 5 years, renewable once
- Formation: 1860
- Website: Official website

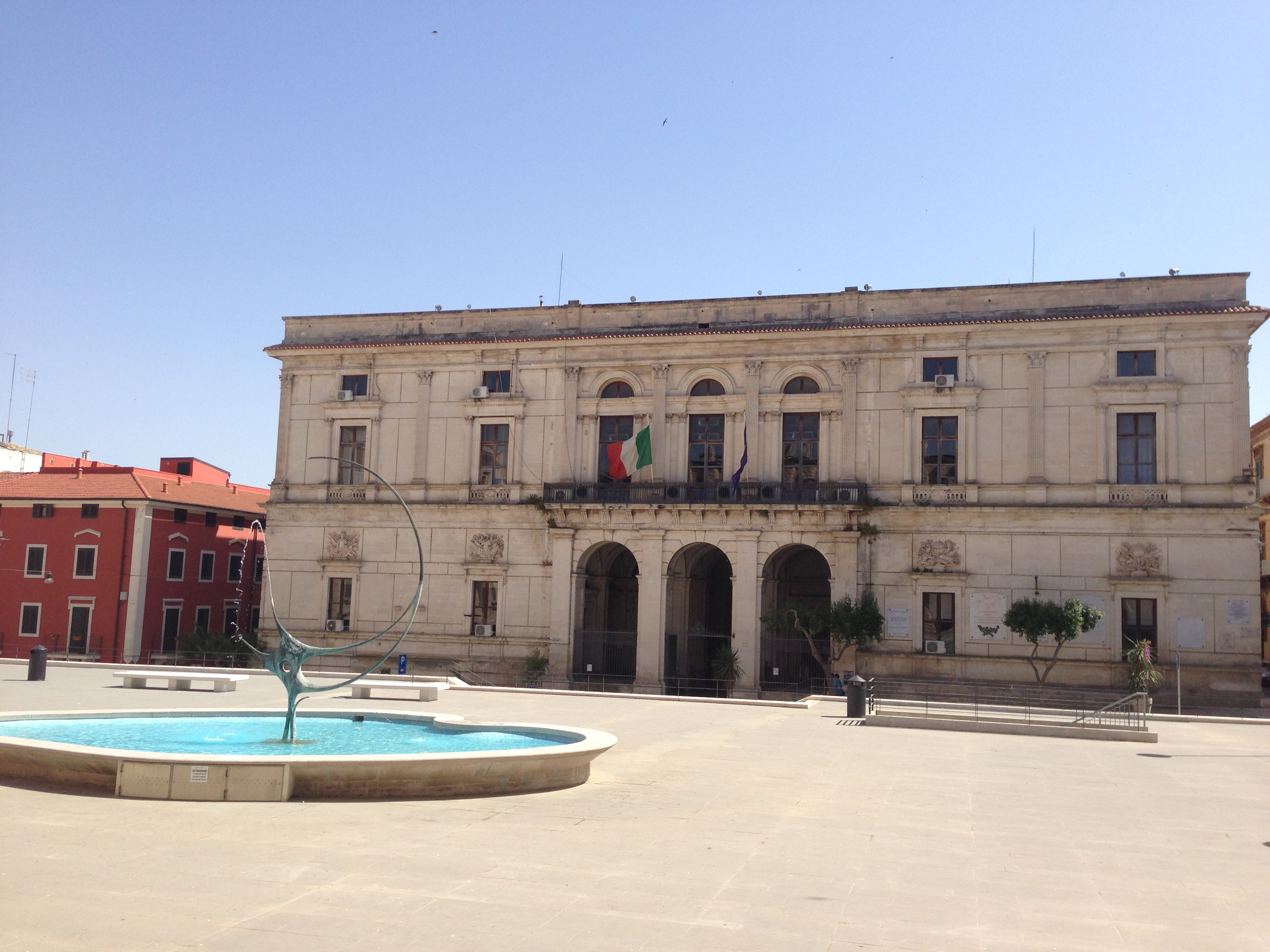
Ragusa's City Hall

The mayor of Ragusa is an elected politician who, along with the Ragusa's City Council, is accountable for the strategic government of Ragusa in Sicily, Italy.

The current mayor is Giuseppe Cassì, a right-wing independent and former basketball player, who took office on 27 June 2018.

== Overview ==
According to the Italian Constitution, the mayor of Ragusa is member of the city council.

The mayor is elected by the population of Ragusa, who also elects the members of the city council, controlling the mayor's policy guidelines and is able to enforce his resignation by a motion of no confidence. The mayor is entitled to appoint and release the members of his government.

Since 1994 the mayor is elected directly by Ragusa's electorate: in all mayoral elections in Italy in cities with a population higher than 15,000 the voters express a direct choice for the mayor or an indirect choice voting for the party of the candidate's coalition. If no candidate receives at least 50% of votes, the top two candidates go to a second round after two weeks. The election of the City Council is based on a direct choice for the candidate with a preference vote: the candidate with the majority of the preferences is elected. The number of the seats for each party is determined proportionally.

== Italian Republic (since 1946) ==
=== City Council election (1946–1994) ===
From 1946 to 1994, the mayor of Ragusa was elected by the City Council.

	Mayor	Term start	Term end	Party
1	Giuseppe Arezzi	7 April 1946	16 June 1952	DC
2	Salvatore Di Giacomo	16 June 1952	16 June 1956	DC
3	Carmelo Pisana	16 June 1956	14 September 1970	DC
4	Giuseppe Di Natale	14 September 1970	24 September 1974	DC
5	Giovanni Minardi	24 September 1974	2 March 1981	DC
6	Sebastiano Tumino	2 March 1981	18 May 1983	DC
7	Angelo Schembri	18 May 1983	1 August 1983	PLI
8	Sebastiano Tumino	1 August 1983	16 May 1984	DC
Special Prefectural Commissioner tenure (16 May 1984 – 2 March 1985)
9	Franco Antoci	2 March 1985	26 June 1987	DC
10	Raffaele Rizzone	26 June 1987	5 December 1987	DC
11	Lorenzo Migliore	5 December 1987	3 October 1988	PSI
(9)	Franco Antoci	3 October 1988	5 November 1991	DC
12	Corrado Roccaro	5 November 1991	5 October 1992	DC
13	Giorgio Massari	5 October 1992	20 February 1994	DC
Special Prefectural Commissioner tenure (20 February 1994 – 28 June 1994)

=== Direct election (since 1994) ===
Since 1994, under provisions of new local administration law, the Mayor of Ragusa is chosen by direct election, originally every four, then every five years.

	Mayor	Term start	Term end	Party	Coalition	Election
14	Giorgio Chessari	28 June 1994	10 June 1998	PDS	PDS • PPI • LR • AD	1994
15	Domenico Arezzo	10 June 1998	10 June 2003	FI	FI • AN • CCD	1998
16	Antonio Solarino	10 June 2003	18 November 2005 (Note: Ousted out of office after losing the majority in the City Council.)	DL	DS • DL • SDI • PRC	2003
Special Prefectural Commissioner tenure (18 November 2005 – 26 June 2006)
17	Nello Dipasquale	26 June 2006	1 June 2011	FI; PdL	FI • AN • UDC	2006
17	Nello Dipasquale	1 June 2011	30 August 2012 (Note: Resigned.)	FI; PdL	PdL • UDC • PID	2011
Special Prefectural Commissioner tenure (30 August 2012 – 26 June 2013)
18	Federico Piccitto	26 June 2013	27 June 2018	M5S	M5S	2013
19	Giuseppe Cassì	27 June 2018	1 June 2023	Ind	Right-wing independent lists	2018
19	Giuseppe Cassì	1 June 2023	Incumbent	Ind	A • UDC • ScN	2023
