= List of presidents of the Province of Gorizia =

President of the Province of Gorizia
- Presidente della Provincia di Gorizia
- Formation: 1927
- Final holder: Enrico Gherghetta
- Abolished: 2016

The president of the Province of Gorizia was the head of the provincial administration of Gorizia, a local government authority in Friuli-Venezia Giulia, Italy.

The province was abolished as an administrative body by Regional Law no. 20 of 9 December 2016, which provided for the suppression of the provinces and the transfer of their functions to other local authorities. The last president, Enrico Gherghetta, left office on 1 December 2016. On that date, Pierpaolo Martina was appointed extraordinary commissioner to manage the liquidation of the provincial administration and complete the transfer of its remaining assets, responsibilities and legal affairs. The province was replaced by a Regional Decentralization Entity (Ente di Decentramento Regionale), an administrative body headed by a general director.

The Province of Gorizia is scheduled to be re-established on 1 January 2027, following the reform of the local government system of Friuli-Venezia Giulia which provides for the reintroduction of the provinces.

== List ==
=== Presidents of the Province (1951–2016) ===
No.	Portrait	Name	Term of office		Party
No.	Portrait	Name	Start	End	Party
		?	?	?	?
		Gian Franco Crisci	21 September 1988	5 June 1991	Christian Democracy
		Gino Saccavini	5 June 1991	9 July 1993	Italian Socialist Party
		Monica Marcolini	9 July 1993	12 May 1997	Lega Nord
		Giorgio Brandolin	12 May 1997	11 June 2001	Independent (centre-left)
		Giorgio Brandolin	11 June 2001	23 April 2006	Independent (centre-left)
		Enrico Gherghetta	23 April 2006	20 May 2011	Democrats of the Left; Democratic Party
		Enrico Gherghetta	20 May 2011	1 December 2016	Democrats of the Left; Democratic Party
–		Pierpaolo Martina (Extraordinary commissioner)	1 December 2016	1 January 2021	—

=== Regional Decentralization Entity of Gorizia (2020–present) ===
No.	General director	Term of office	
No.	General director	Start	End
–	Paolo Viola (Extraordinary commissioner)	1 April 2020	2 August 2023
1	Sandra Sodini	2 August 2023	1 August 2024
2	Igor De Bastiani	1 August 2024	Incumbent

== Sources ==
- "Storia amministrativa dell'ente". Ministero dell'Interno.
