= List of mayors of Caserta =

Mayor of Caserta
- Sindaco di Caserta
- Incumbent; Carlo Marino (PD) since 21 June 2016
- Appointer: Popular election
- Term length: 5 years, renewable once
- Formation: 1860
- Website: Official website

The mayor of Caserta is an elected politician who, along with the Caserta City Council, is accountable for the strategic government of Caserta in Campania, Italy.

The current mayor is Carlo Marino (PD), who took office on 21 June 2016.

== Overview ==
According to the Italian Constitution, the mayor of Caserta is member of the City Council.

The mayor is elected by the population of Caserta, who also elects the members of the City Council, controlling the mayor's policy guidelines and is able to enforce his resignation by a motion of no confidence. The mayor is entitled to appoint and release the members of his government.

Since 1993 the mayor is elected directly by Caserta's electorate: in all mayoral elections in Italy in cities with a population higher than 15,000 the voters express a direct choice for the mayor or an indirect choice voting for the party of the candidate's coalition. If no candidate receives at least 50% of votes, the top two candidates go to a second round after two weeks. The election of the City Council is based on a direct choice for the candidate with a preference vote: the candidate with the majority of the preferences is elected. The number of the seats for each party is determined proportionally.

== Italian Republic (since 1946) ==
=== City Council election (1946-1993) ===
From 1946 to 1993, the Mayor of Caserta was elected by the City Council.

	Mayor	Term start	Term end	Party
1	Roberto Lodati	1946	1947	DC
2	Vincenzo Cappiello	1947	1948	Ind
3	Sebastiano Giaquinto	1948	1951	Ind
Special Prefectural Commissioner's tenure (1951–1952)
(2)	Vincenzo Cappiello	1952	1952	Ind
4	Marco Antonio Fusco	1952	1956	PLI
5	Pasquale Salvatores	1956	1959	DC
(1)	Roberto Lodati	1960	1964	DC
6	Salvatore Di Nardo	1964	1970	DC
7	Vincenzo Gallicola	1970	1975	DC
8	Casimiro De Franciscis	1975	1978	DC
9	Gianpaolo Iaselli	1978	1983	DC
(7)	Vincenzo Gallicola	1983	1988	DC
10	Domenico Di Cresce	1988	1990	DC
11	Giuseppe Gasparin	1990	1993	DC

=== Direct election (since 1993) ===
Since 1993, under provisions of new local administration law, the mayor of Caserta is chosen by direct election, originally every four, then every five years.

	Mayor	Term start	Term end	Party	Coalition	Election
12	Aldo Bulzoni	5 December 1993	1 December 1997	Ind	PDS • LR	1993
13	Luigi Falco	1 December 1997	28 May 2002	FI	FI • AN • CCD • CDU	1997
13	Luigi Falco	28 May 2002	8 December 2005 (Note: Resigned after suffering a vote of no confidence in the City Council.)	FI	FI • AN • UDC	2002
Special Prefectural Commissioner's tenure (8 December 2005 – 13 June 2006)
14	Nicodemo Petteruti	13 June 2006	4 January 2011 (Note: Resigned.)	Ind	DS • DL • PRC • RnP • UDEUR	2006
Special Prefectural Commissioner's tenure (4 January 2011 – 18 May 2011)
15	Pio Del Gaudio	18 May 2011	3 June 2015 (Note: Ousted from office after the majority of the members of the City Council resigned.)	PdL	PdL • UDC • NPSI • MpA	2011
Special Prefectural Commissioner's tenure (3 June 2015 – 21 June 2016)
16	Carlo Marino	21 June 2016	21 October 2021	PD	PD • CD • PSI • FdV	2016
16	Carlo Marino	21 October 2021 (Note: Election originally scheduled for June 2021 then postponed due to the COVID-19 pandemic.)	23 April 2025 (Note: Removed from office by the national Government.)	PD	PD • CD • PSI • Mod • IV	2021
Special Commission's tenure (since 23 April 2025) (Note: Special Commission nominated after the municipal administration was dissolved by the Government due to Camorra association.)
