= Giovanni Correnti =

Italian lawyer and politician

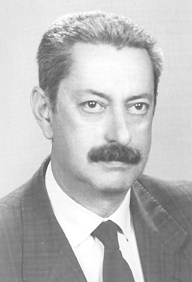

Member of the Senate
- In office 3 August 1988 – 22 April 1992

Member of the Chamber of Deputies
- In office 30 April 1992 – 14 April 1994

Mayor of Novara
- In office 12 May 1997 – 14 May 2001
- Preceded by: Sergio Merusi
- Succeeded by: Massimo Giordano

Personal details
- Born: 8 June 1940 Novara, Piedmont, Italy
- Died: 13 October 2016 (aged 76) Novara, Piedmont, Italy
- Party: Italian Communist Party; Democratic Party of the Left; Democrats of the Left
- Profession: lawyer

Giovanni Correnti (8 June 1940 – 13 October 2016) was an Italian lawyer and politician, who served as Senator (1988–1992), Deputy (1992–1994) and Mayor of Novara (1997–2001).

Political offices
Preceded by Sergio Merusi	Mayor of Novara; 1997–2001	Succeeded by Massimo Giordano
