= Bruno Valentini =

Italian politician (born 1955)

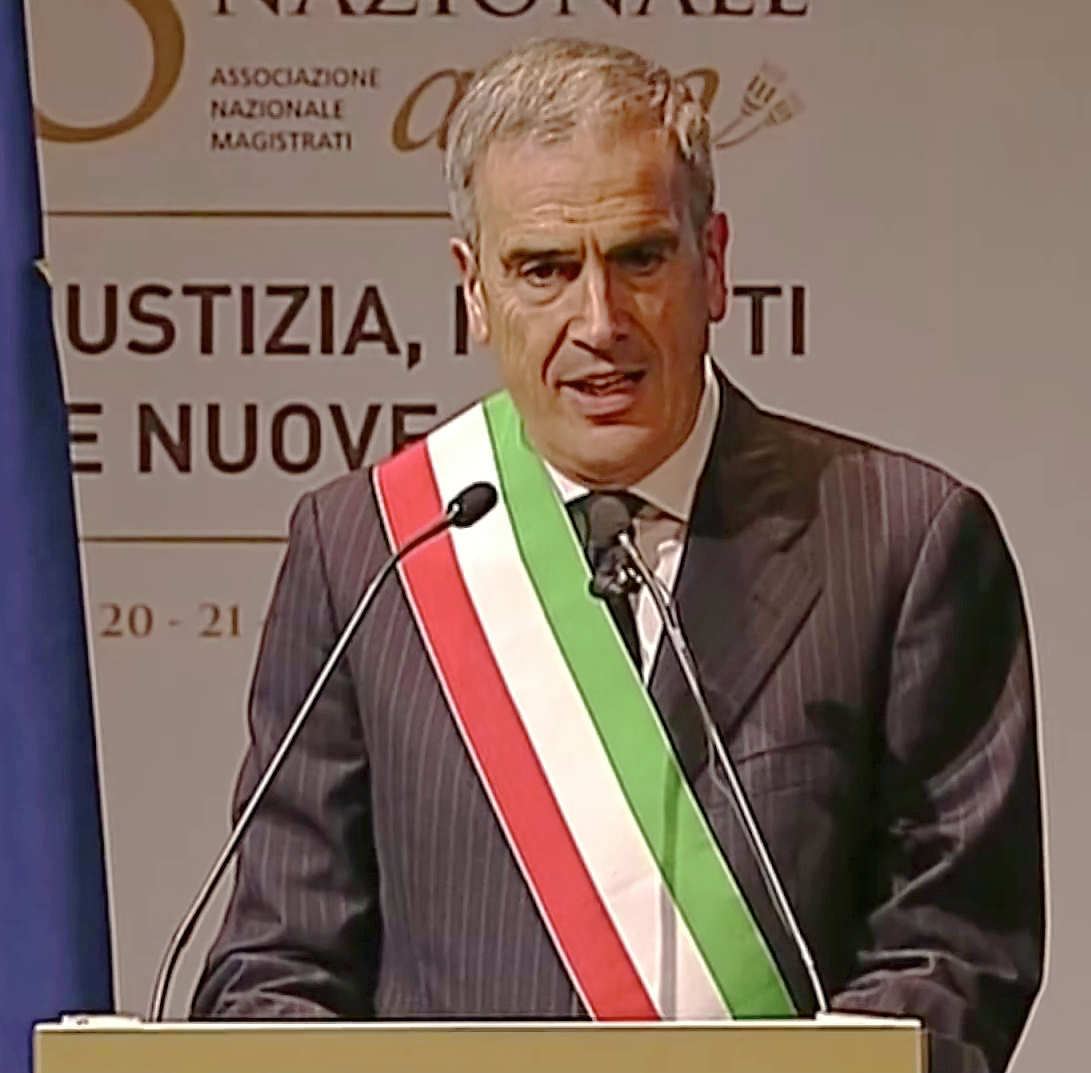

Mayor of Siena
- In office 11 June 2013 – 25 June 2018
- Preceded by: Franco Ceccuzzi
- Succeeded by: Luigi De Mossi

Mayor of Monteriggioni
- In office 14 June 2004 – 22 April 2013
- Preceded by: Paolo Casprini
- Succeeded by: Raffaella Senesi

Personal details
- Born: 29 May 1955 (age 71) Colle di Val d'Elsa, Tuscany, Italy
- Party: PCI (1973-1991); PDS (1991-1998); DS (1998-2007); PD (since 2007)
- Education: University of Siena
- Profession: bank employee

Bruno Valentini (born 29 May 1955 in Colle di Val d'Elsa) is an Italian politician.

Valentini started his political career in Siena and then as a municipal councillor in Monteriggioni, Tuscany, in 1995. He served as Mayor of Monteriggioni from 2004 to 2013. He has been a member of the Democratic Party since 2007.

Valentini was elected Mayor of Siena on 11 June 2013. He ran for a second term at the 2018 Italian local elections, but was defeated by the centre-right candidate Luigi De Mossi.

== See also ==
- 2013 Italian local elections
- 2018 Italian local elections
- List of mayors of Siena

Political offices
Preceded by Franco Ceccuzzi	Mayor of Siena; 2013–2018	Succeeded by Luigi De Mossi
