= Luigi Falco =

Italian politician and doctor

Mayor of Caserta
- In office 1 December 1997 – 8 December 2005
- Preceded by: Aldo Bulzoni
- Succeeded by: Nicodemo Petteruti

Personal details
- Born: 21 March 1951 Dragoni, Italy
- Died: 3 February 2013 (aged 61) Piedimonte Matese, Italy
- Party: Christian Democratic Centre
- Occupation: Doctor

Luigi Falco (21 March 1951 – 3 February 2013) was an Italian politician and doctor.

He was member of the Christian Democratic Centre Party. He has served as Mayor of Caserta from 1997 to 2005. He was elected mayor of Caserta to the administrative of 1997. He was again candidate for mayor for Popolari UDEUR. He was re-elected for a second term in the 2002 elections. He fell out of office as mayor in December 2005.

== Biography ==
Luigi Falco was born in Dragoni, Italy on 1951 and died in Piedimonte Matese, Italy on 2013 at the age of 61. He was director of the neonatology unit of the Sant'Anna and San Sebastiano hospital in Caserta.

== See also ==
- List of mayors of Caserta

Political offices
Preceded by Aldo Bulzoni	Mayor of Caserta; 1 December 1997—8 December 2005	Succeeded by Nicodemo Petteruti
