= Massimo Giordano =

Italian opera singer

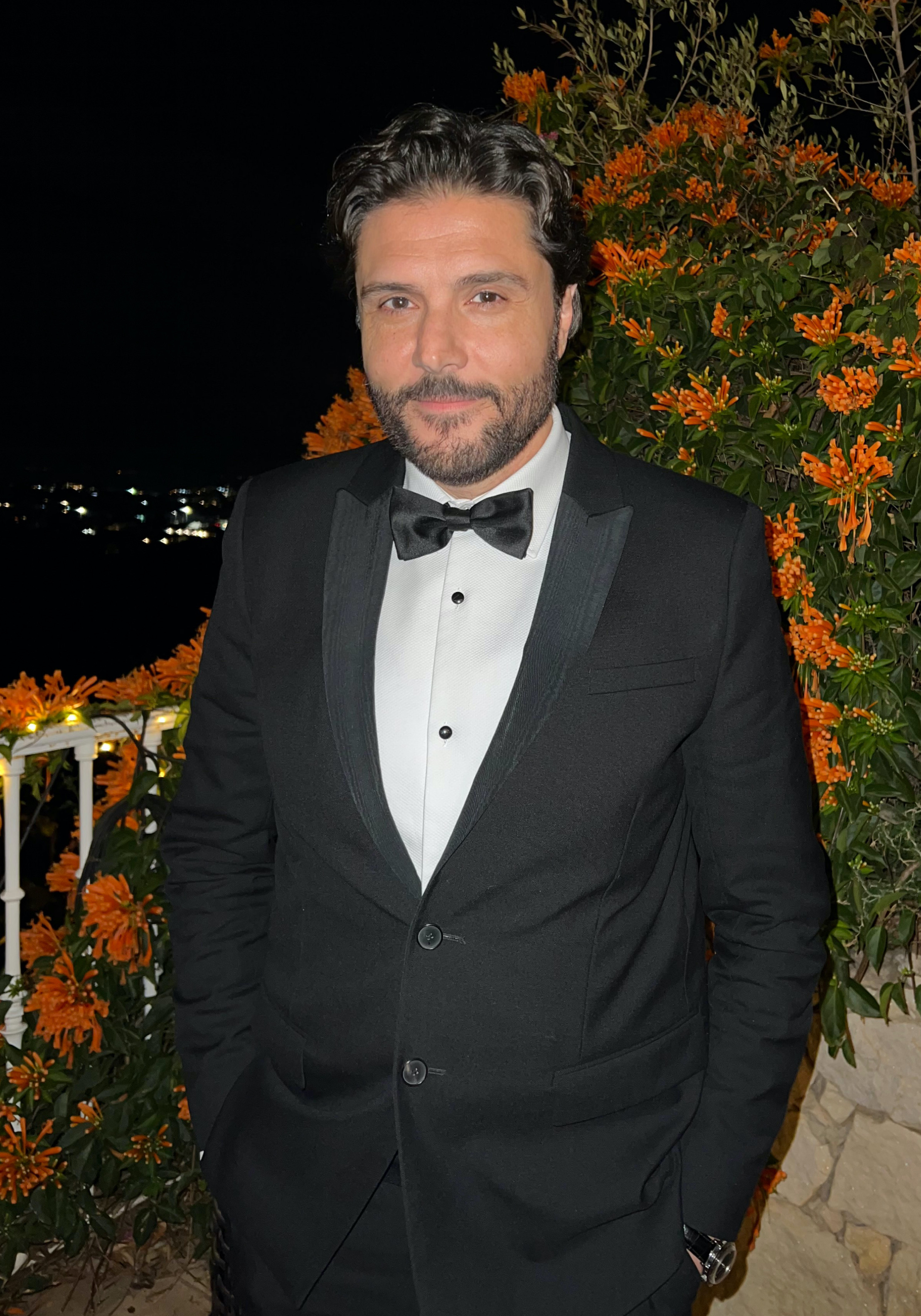
- Giordano in 2023
- Born: 19 February 1971 (age 55); Pompei, Italy
- Occupation: Opera singer (tenor)
- Years active: 1997–present
- Website: Official website

Massimo Giordano (born 19 February 1971) is an Italian operatic tenor.

== Early life ==
Giordano was born in Pompei, Italy, into an Italian working-class family.

At the age of 8, Giordano moved with his family to Trieste where he attended the local conservatory G. Tartini. He studied the flute and then moved to singing. He studied singing with Cecilia Fusco at the age of 18 and later graduated from the conservatory. In 1997 he won the A. Belli competition in Spoleto where he also gave his debut in La Clemenza di Tito at the Teatro Lirico.

== Career ==
Giordano performed in Venice, Reggio Emilia, Rome, Parma, Naples, Modena and eventually at La Scala in Milan. His debut outside of Italy took place in 2001 at the Salzburg Festival with Lorin Maazel and Claudio Abbado. Debuts at the Semper Opera in Dresden, the Zurich Opera, the Teatro Real in Madrid and the Theatre du Capitole in Toulouse followed.

Giordano also performed in Il trittico, L'Elisir d’Amore, Manon, La Traviata, and La bohème.

In 2005 Giordano was part of a special performance of Verdi's Requiem at the Vatican in remembrance of the recently deceased Pope John Paul II.

In 2006 Giordano's appearance in Massenet's Manon with Renée Fleming at the Metropolitan Opera was broadcast on radio worldwide.

On 29 October 2012, Giordano signed an agreement with BMG Rights Management. He recorded his first album, titled Amore e Tormento, with the Ensemble Del Maggio Musicale in Florence, Italy, which features Italian arias; it was released on 6 May 2013.

== Personal life ==
He has two children with his wife Alexandrina and lives with his family in northern Italy.
