= Nicodemo Petteruti =

Italian politician and engineer

Mayor of Caserta
- In office 13 June 2006 – 4 January 2011
- Preceded by: Luigi Falco
- Succeeded by: Pio Del Gaudio

Personal details
- Born: 1 July 1940 (age 86) Roccamonfina, Campania, Italy
- Party: Democratic Party
- Education: University of Naples Federico II
- Occupation: Engineer

Nicodemo Petteruti (born 1 July 1940) is an Italian politician and engineer.

He is current member of the Democratic Party. He was born in Roccamonfina, Italy. He has served as Mayor of Caserta from 2006 to 2011. He graduated in engineering. He held the position of director of the Order of engineers of Caserta. He was councilor for public works for the town of Caserta.

== See also ==
- List of mayors of Caserta

Political offices
Preceded by Luigi Falco	Mayor of Caserta; 13 June 2006—4 January 2011	Succeeded by Pio Del Gaudio
