= Federico Piccitto =

Italian politician

Mayor of Ragusa
- In office 26 June 2013 – 27 June 2018
- Preceded by: Nello Dipasquale
- Succeeded by: Giuseppe Cassì

Personal details
- Born: 30 September 1976 (age 50) Ragusa, Sicily, Italy
- Party: Five Star Movement
- Education: University of Catania
- Profession: engineer

Federico Piccitto (born 30 September 1976 in Ragusa) is an Italian politician.

Member of the Five Star Movement, Piccitto was elected Mayor of Ragusa at the 2013 Italian local elections and served from 26 June 2013 to 27 June 2018.

== See also ==
- 2013 Italian local elections
- List of mayors of Ragusa

Political offices
Preceded by Nello Dipasquale	Mayor of Ragusa; 2013–2018	Succeeded by Giuseppe Cassì
