= Fabio Scoccimarro =

Italian politician (born 1957)

Regional assessor for Environment of Friuli-Venezia Giulia
- Incumbent
- Assumed office 22 May 2018
- President: Massimiliano Fedriga

President of the Province of Trieste
- In office 24 June 2001 – 24 April 2006
- Preceded by: Renzo Codarin
- Succeeded by: Maria Teresa Bassa Poropat

Personal details
- Born: 18 September 1957 (age 69) Trieste, Italy
- Party: National Alliance; Brothers of Italy
- Education: University of Trieste
- Occupation: Entrepreneur

Fabio Scoccimarro (born 18 September 1957) is an Italian politician and entrepreneur serving as a regional assessor for Environment in the government of Friuli-Venezia Giulia since 2018. He previously served as president of the Province of Trieste from 2001 to 2006.

== Life career ==
Scoccimarro graduated in humanities from the University of Trieste.

He served as an assessor of the Province of Trieste from 1997 to 2001. In the 2001 provincial election, he was elected president of the province after defeating centre-left candidate Ettore Rosato in the runoff, receiving 51.8% of the vote. His candidacy was supported by National Alliance, Forza Italia, the Northern League and the New PSI.

He stood for re-election in the 2006 provincial election, but was defeated in the runoff by Maria Teresa Bassa Poropat. He remained in the Provincial Council until 2011.

Scoccimarro subsequently became active in Brothers of Italy. In 2018, he was appointed regional assessor for environment, energy and sustainable development in the Friuli-Venezia Giulia regional government headed by Massimiliano Fedriga. He was elected to the Regional Council of Friuli-Venezia Giulia in 2023 and confirmed assessor.
