= Mauro Persiani =

Italian footballer

Personal information
- Date of birth: November 15, 1956 (age 69)
- Place of birth: Bologna, Italy
- Height: 1.80 m (5 ft 11 in)
- Position: Striker

Senior career*
| Years | Team | Apps | (Gls) |
| 1974–1975 | San Lazzaro Savena | 9 | (2) |
| 1975–1976 | Roma | 3 | (0) |
| 1976–1977 | Novara | 1 | (0) |
| 1977–1978 | Benevento | 25 | (1) |
| 1978–1979 | Latina | 22 | (1) |
| 1979–1982 | Squinzano | 55 | (7) |
| 1982–1983 | Frosinone | 16 | (3) |
- * Club domestic league appearances and goals

Mauro Persiani (born November 15, 1956, in Bologna) is a retired Italian professional football player.

The three games that he played for A.S. Roma in the 1975/76 season were his only Serie A appearances.

He hit the crossbar in the last minutes of Roma-Juventus .
