= List of mayors of Siena =

Mayor of Siena
- Sindaco di Siena

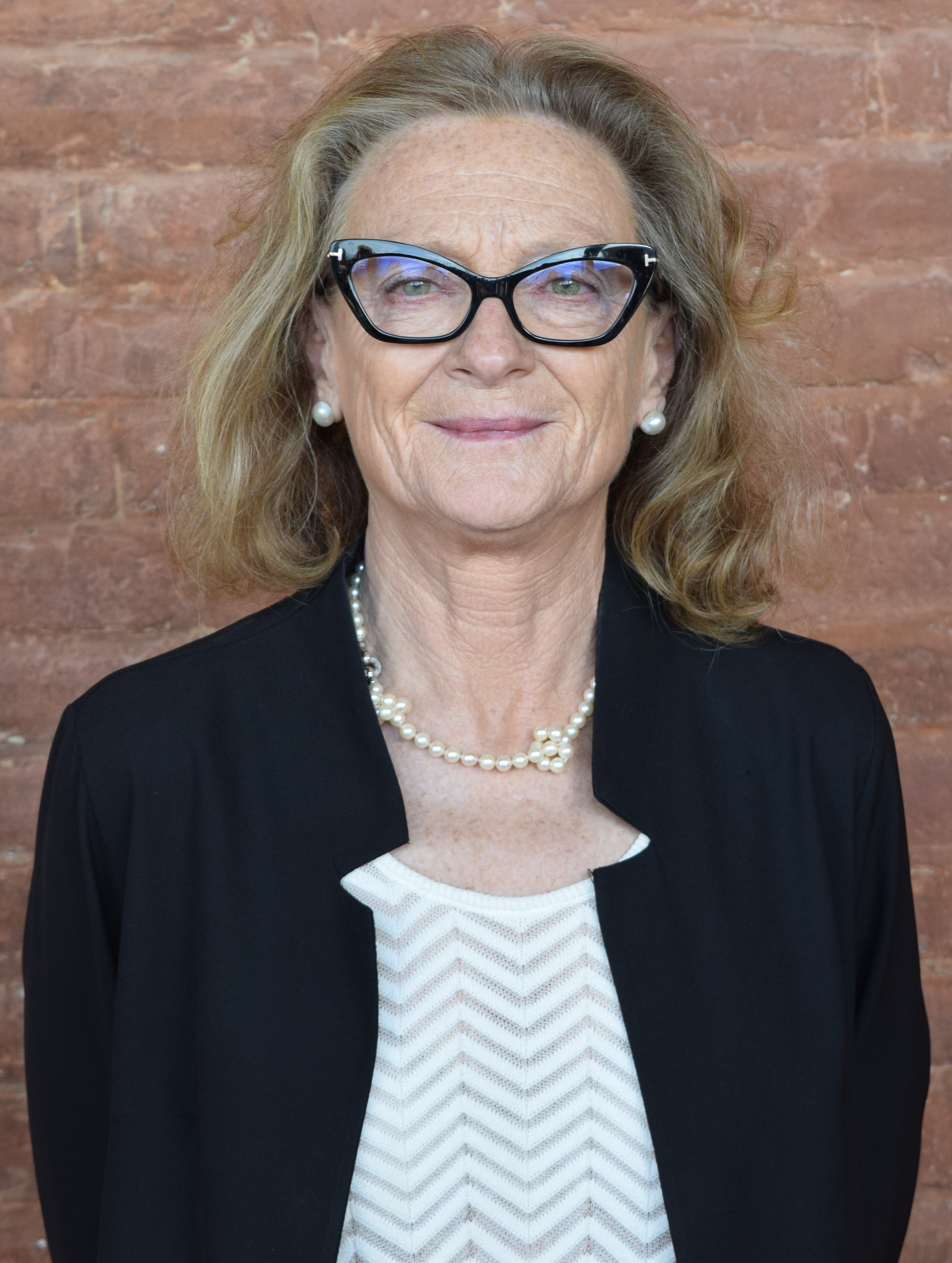
- Incumbent; Nicoletta Fabio since 19 June 2023
- Style: No title, courtesy or style
- Seat: Palazzo Pubblico
- Appointer: Popular election
- Term length: 5 years, renewable once
- Inaugural holder: Bernardo Tolomei
- Formation: 1865
- Website: Official website

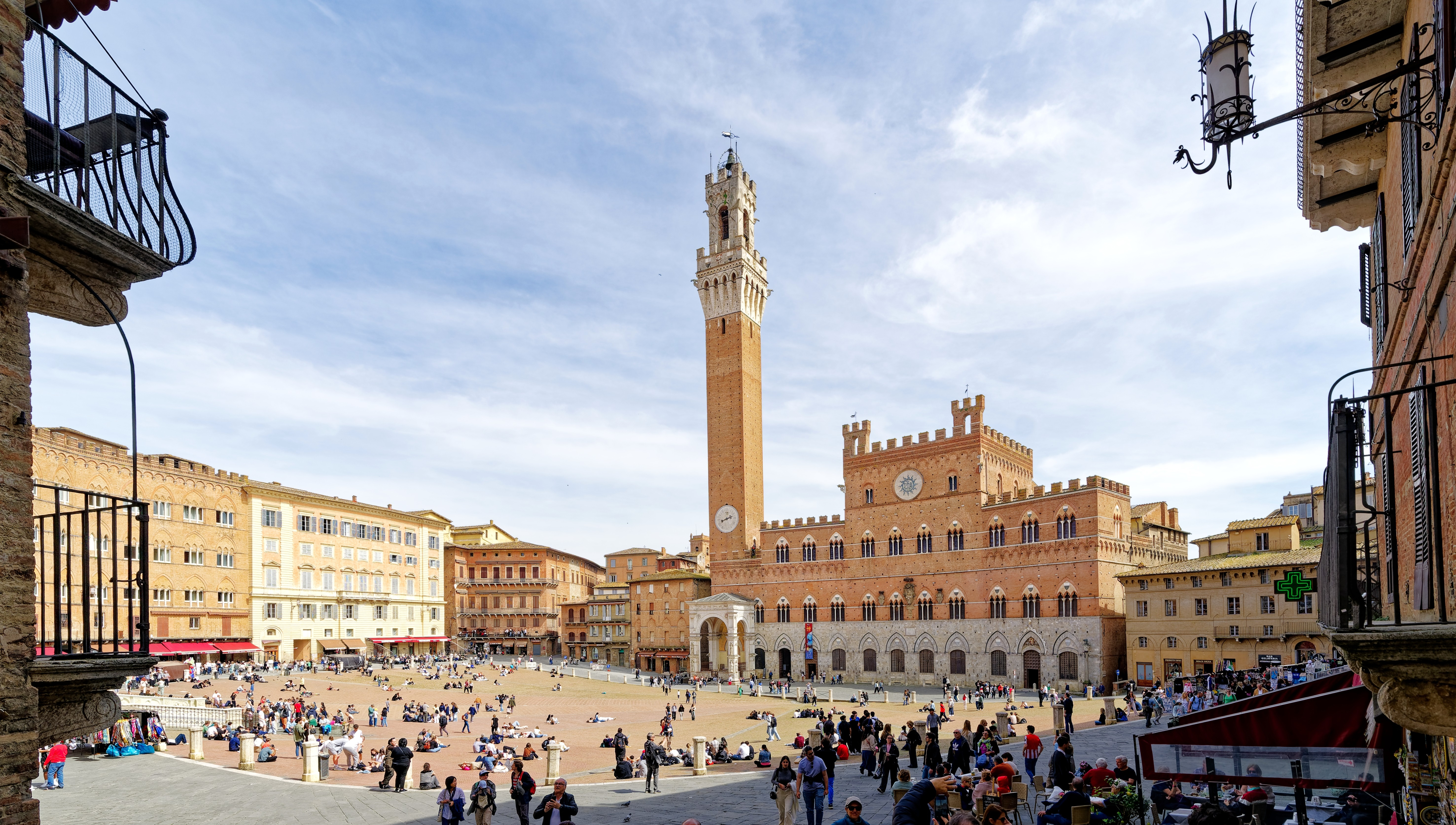
Palazzo Pubblico is Siena's City Hall and the seat of the mayor.

The mayor of Siena is an elected politician who, along with the Siena's city council, is accountable for the strategic government of Siena in Tuscany, Italy.

The current mayor is Nicoletta Fabio, a centre-right independent and the first woman to hold the office, who took office on 19 June 2023.

== Overview ==
According to the Italian Constitution, the mayor of Siena is member of the City Council.

The mayor is elected by the population of Siena, who also elects the members of the City Council, controlling the mayor's policy guidelines and is able to enforce their resignation by a motion of no confidence. The mayor is entitled to appoint and release the members of their government.

Since 1993 the mayor is elected directly by Siena's electorate: in all mayoral elections in Italy in cities with a population higher than 15,000 the voters express a direct choice for the mayor or an indirect choice voting for the party of the candidate's coalition. If no candidate receives at least 50% of votes, the top two candidates go to a second round after two weeks. The election of the City Council is based on a direct choice for the candidate with a preference vote: the candidate with the majority of the preferences is elected. The number of the seats for each party is determined proportionally.

== Kingdom of Italy (1861–1946) ==
In 1865, the Kingdom of Italy created the office of Mayor of Siena (Sindaco di Siena), appointed by the King himself. From 1892 to 1926 the mayor was elected by the city council. In 1926, the Fascist dictatorship abolished mayors and City councils, replacing them with an authoritarian Podestà chosen by the National Fascist Party. The office of mayor was restored in 1944 during the Allied occupation.

	Mayor	Term start	Term end	Party
Mayors appointed by the King (1865–1889)
1	Bernardo Tolomei (1823–1910)	1865	1866	
2	Tiberio Sergardi (1816–1886)	1866	1867	
(1)	Bernardo Tolomei (1823–1910)	1867	1869	
3	Luciano Banchi (1837–1887)	1869	1870	
4	Federico Comini (1803–1884)	1870	1871	
5	Domenico Mazzi (1822–1896)	1871	1877	
(3)	Luciano Banchi (1837–1887)	1877	1878	
6	Giuseppe Palmieri Nuti (1843–1893)	1878	1879	
(3)	Luciano Banchi (1837–1887)	1880	1887	
7	Aristodemo Ficalbi (1821–1894)	1888	1889	
Mayors elected by the City Council (1889–1926)
8	Luigi Valenti Serini (?–1912)	1889	1890	
9	Remigio Bartalini (1839–1918)	1892	1893	
10	Enrico Crocini (1839–1916)	1894	1896	
11	Enrico Falaschi (1863–1929)	1896	1898	
12	Bonaventura Chigi Zondadari (1841–1908)	1899	1899	
13	Guido Sarrocchi (1868–1934)	1899	1899	
14	Alessandro Lisini (1851–1945)	1900	1905	
15	Carlo Ponticelli (1848–1907)	1905	1906	
16	Mario Bianchi Bandinelli (1848–1930)	1906	1913	
17	Livio Socini (1866–?)	1914	1916	
18	Emanuello Pannocchieschi d'Elci (1875–1937)	1916	1920	
19	Angiolo Rosini (1864–?)	1920	1921	
20	Fabio Bargagli Petrucci (1875–1939)	1923	1923	PNF
21	Vittorio Martini	1923	1925	PNF
Fascist Podestà (1926–1944)
1	Fabio Bargagli Petrucci (1875–1939)	1926	1936	PNF
2	Mario Tadini Buoninsegni (1889–1974)	1936	1938	PNF
3	Luigi Socini Guelfi (1906–2008)	1938	1944	PNF
Allied occupation (1944–1946)
22	Carlo Ciampolini (1888–1986)	1944	1946	Ind

== Republic of Italy (since 1946) ==
=== City Council election (1946–1993) ===
From 1946 to 1993 the Mayor of Siena was elected by the City Council.

	Mayor	Term start	Term end	Party	Coalition	Election
1	Ilio Bocci (1904–1975)	5 April 1946	20 September 1949	PCI	PCI • PSI • DC	1946
Special Prefectural Commissioner's tenure (20 September 1949 – 23 June 1951) (Note: Nominated by the Prefect since the City Council failed to elect a new Mayor after the incumbent's resignation.)
(1)	Ilio Bocci (1904–1975)	23 June 1951	24 June 1956	PCI	PCI • PSI	1951
2	Bruno Bottai (1895–1967)	24 June 1956	16 July 1956 (Note: Refused to accept the election.)	DC	none (Note: Elected by DC, PSDI and MSI. He refused the election and never formed an executive.)	1956
3	Ugo Bartalini (1899–2000)	31 August 1956	6 November 1960	PSI	PCI • PSI	1956
3	Ugo Bartalini (1899–2000)	6 November 1960	25 January 1965	PSI	PCI • PSI	1960
4	Fazio Fabbrini (1926–2018)	25 January 1965	19 July 1966	PCI	PCI • PSI	1964
Special Prefectural Commissioner's tenure (19 July 1966 – 20 December 1968) (Note: Nominated by the Prefect since the City Council failed to elect a new Mayor after the incumbent's resignation.)
5	Canzio Vannini (1920–2001)	20 December 1968	3 June 1969	PSIUP	PSIUP • DC • PRI	1968
6	Luciano Mencaraglia (1915–2002)	26 July 1969	2 December 1969	PCI	PCI • PSIUP	1968
7	Roberto Barzanti (b. 1939)	2 December 1969	11 January 1974	PSIUP	PCI • PSIUP	1968
(5)	Canzio Vannini (1920–2001)	11 January 1974	31 July 1979	PSI	PCI • PSI	1973
8	Mauro Barni (1927–2017)	31 July 1979	20 September 1983	PSI	PCI • PSI	1979
9	Vittorio Mazzoni della Stella (b. 1941)	20 September 1983	2 September 1988	PSI	PCI • PSI	1983
9	Vittorio Mazzoni della Stella (b. 1941)	2 September 1988	29 November 1990	PSI	PCI • PSI	1988
10	Pierluigi Piccini (b. 1952)	29 November 1990	21 June 1993	PCI	PCI • PSI	1988

=== Direct election (since 1993) ===
Since 1993, under the provisions of a new law on local administrations, the Mayor of Siena is chosen by direct election, originally every four, then every five years.

	Mayor	Took office	Left office	Party	Coalition	Election
(10)	Pierluigi Piccini (b. 1952)	21 June 1993	28 April 1997	PDS; DS	PDS	1993
(10)	Pierluigi Piccini (b. 1952)	28 April 1997	14 May 2001	PDS; DS	The Olive Tree (PDS-PRC-PPI)	1997
11	Maurizio Cenni (b. 1955)	14 May 2001	30 May 2006	DS; PD	The Olive Tree (DS-PRC-DL)	2001
11	Maurizio Cenni (b. 1955)	30 May 2006	18 May 2011	DS; PD	The Olive Tree (DS-PRC-DL)	2006
12	Franco Ceccuzzi (b. 1967)	18 May 2011	12 June 2012 (Note: Resigned after the City Council didn't approve the annual budget.)	PD	PD • SEL	2011
Special Prefectural Commissioner's tenure (12 June 2012 – 11 June 2013)
13	Bruno Valentini (b. 1955)	11 June 2013	25 June 2018	PD	PD • SEL	2013
14	Luigi De Mossi (b. 1960)	25 June 2018	19 June 2023	Ind	Lega • FdI • FI	2018
15	Nicoletta Fabio (b. 1961)	19 June 2023	Incumbent	Ind	FdI • Lega • FI	2023

== Elections ==
=== City Council elections, 1946–1988 ===
Results

Number of votes for each party:

Election	DC	PCI	PSI	PLI	PRI	PSDI	MSI	Others	Total
24 March 1946	7,849 (27.0%)	8,991 (30.9%)	5,876 (20.2%)	3,997 (13.8%)	1,899 (6.5%)	–	–	466 (1.6%)	29,078
10 June 1951	12,359 (36.0%)	15,421 (45.0%)		1,140 (3.3%)	1,187 (3.4%)	1,485 (4.3%)	2,704 (7.9%)	–	34,296
27 May 1956	12,311 (33.1%)	11,559 (31.1%)	6,280 (16.9%)	1,291 (3.5%)	661 (1.8%)	1,768 (4.8%)	2,497 (6.7%)	–	37,132
6 November 1960	12,511 (30.3%)	15,548 (37.6%)	5,447 (13.2%)	975 (2.4%)	–	–	2,228 (5.4%)	4,613 (11.2%)	41,332
22 November 1964	13,084 (29.4%)	18,346 (41.3%)	3,500 (7.9%)	3,654 (8.2%)	300 (0.7%)	1,840 (4.1%)	2,033 (4.6%)	1,701 (3.8%)	44,458
11 June 1967 (Note: Snap election.)	15,093 (33.5%)	18,172 (40.4%)	5,885 (13.1%)	1,754 (3.9%)	427 (0.9%)	–	1,496 (3.3%)	2,177 (4.8%)	45,004
17 November 1968	17,264 (38.1%)	20,558 (45.3%)	6,031 (13.3%)	–	–	–	1,570 (3.4%)	–	45,423
18 November 1973	13,266 (28.7%)	19,733 (42.7%)	5,540 (12.0%)	1,147 (2.5%)	1,479 (3.2%)	1,339 (2.9%)	2,650 (5.7%)	1,103 (2.4%)	46,257
3 June 1979	14,637 (30.6%)	20,546 (43.0%)	5,600 (11.7%)	850 (1.8%)	1,640 (3.4%)	993 (2.1%)	1,705 (3.6%)	1,831 (3.8%)	47,802
26 June 1983	12,773 (28.3%)	18,538 (41.1%)	6,383 (14.1%)	1,184 (2.6%)	2,175 (4.8%)	1,149 (2.5%)	1,901 (4.2%)	992 (2.2%)	45,095
29 May 1988	12,525 (28.2%)	15,962 (35.9%)	9,135 (20.5%)	787 (1.8%)	1,617 (3.6%)	681 (1.5%)	1,564 (3.5%)	2,213 (4.98%)	44,484

Notes

Number of seats in the City Council for each party:

Election	DC	PCI	PSI	PLI	PRI	PSDI	MSI	Others	Total
24 March 1946	11	13	8	6	2	–	–	–	40
10 June 1951	9	17	9	1	1	1	2	–	40
27 May 1956	14	13	7	1	–	2	3	–	40
6 November 1960	13	16	5	1	–	–	2	3	40
22 November 1964	12	18	3	3	–	1	2	1	40
11 June 1967	14	17	5	1	–	–	1	2	40
17 November 1968	15	19	5	–	–	–	1	–	40
18 November 1973	12	17	5	1	1	1	2	1	40
3 June 1979	13	19	5	–	1	–	1	1	40
26 June 1983	12	17	6	1	2	1	1	–	40
29 May 1988	12	16	9	–	1	–	1	1	40

=== Mayoral and City Council election, 1993 ===
The election took place in two rounds: the first on 6 June and the second on 20 June 1993.

Results

Summary of the 1993 Siena City Council election results
Parties and coalitions		Votes	%	Seats
Democratic Party of the Left (Partito Democratico della Sinistra)	PDS	13,449	35.89%	24
Christian Democracy (Democrazia Cristiana)	DC	7,715	20.59%	6
Alliance for Siena (Alleanza per Siena)	ApS	5,808	15.50%	4
Together for Siena (Insieme per Siena); Socialist Party–Democratic Socialist Party–Liberal Party	PSI–PSDI –PLI	5,484	14.64%	4
Communist Refoundation Party (Partito della Rifondazione Comunista)	PRC	2,430	6.49%	1
Italian Social Movement (Movimento Sociale Italiano)	MSI	1,982	5.29%	1
Others		601	1.60%	0
Total		37,469	100%	40
Votes cast/turnout		42,645	85.39%	
Registered voters		49,940		
Source: Ministry of the Interior

Candidate	Party	Coalition	First round		Second round	
Candidate	Party	Coalition	Votes	%	Votes	%
Pierluigi Piccini	PDS		15,123	37.80	18,667	55.95
Vittorio Carnesecchi	DC		8,947	22.36	14,694	44.05
Achille Neri	AD		6,738	16.84		
Mario Menicori	PSI	PSI-PSDI-PLI	4,190	10.47		
Eriase Belardi	PRC		2,548	6.37		
Amedeo Monfardini	MSI		1,839	4.60		
Others			621	1.55		
Eligible voters			49,940	100.00	49,940	100.00
Voted			42,645	85.39	35,858	71.80
Blank or invalid ballots			2,639		2,497	
Total valid votes			40,006		33,361	

=== Mayoral and City Council election, 1997 ===
The election took place on 27 April 1997.

Results

Summary of the 1997 Siena City Council election results
Parties and coalitions		Votes	%	Seats
Democratic Party of the Left (Partito Democratico della Sinistra)	PDS	11,462	33.03%	14
Communist Refoundation Party (Rifondazione Comunista)	PRC	2,746	7.91%	3
Italian People's Party (Partito Popolare Italiano)	PPI	2,644	7.62%	3
Others		5,237	15.10%	6
Piccini coalition (Centre-left)		22,089	63.66%	26
Siena for Freedoms (Siena per le Libertà)	SpL	7,144	20.59%	9
Others		4,349	12.53%	4
Sensi coalition (Centre-right)		11,493	33.12%	13
Federation of the Greens (Federazione dei Verdi)	FdV	1,117	3.22%	1
Total		34,699	100%	40
Votes cast/turnout		40,324	83.27%	
Registered voters		48,428		
Source: Ministry of the Interior

Candidate	Party	Coalition	First round	
Candidate	Party	Coalition	Votes	%
Pierluigi Piccini	PDS	The Olive Tree	23,176	60.55
Senio Sensi	FI	Pole for Freedoms	13,620	35.58
Giovanni Giuliani	FdV		1,480	3.87
Eligible voters			48,428	100.00
Voted			40,324	83.27
Blank or invalid ballots			2,048	
Total valid votes			38,276	

=== Mayoral and City Council election, 2001 ===
The election took place on 13 May 2001.

Results

Summary of the 2001 Siena City Council election results
Parties and coalitions		Votes	%	Seats
Democrats of the Left (Democratici di Sinistra)	DS	12,256	34.36%	16
Italian People's Party (Partito Popolare Italiano)	PPI	2,583	7.24%	3
Reformist List (Lista Riformista)	LR	1,688	4.73%	2
Communist Refoundation Party (Rifondazione Comunista)	PRC	1,514	4.24%	2
Others		2,897	8.12%	2
Cenni coalition (Centre-left)		20,938	58.70%	25
Forza Italia	FI	5,427	15.22%	7
National Alliance (Alleanza Nazionale)	AN	3,804	10.67%	4
Others		855	2.40%	1
Fabio coalition (Centre-right)		10,086	28.28%	12
The Other Siena (L'Altra Siena)	LAS	2,925	8.20%	3
Others		1,718	4.82%	0
Total		35,667	100%	40
Votes cast/turnout		41,204	86.53%	
Registered voters		47,619		
Source: Ministry of the Interior

Candidate	Party	Coalition	First round	
Candidate	Party	Coalition	Votes	%
Maurizio Cenni	DS	The Olive Tree	22,701	57.79
Massimo Fabio	FI	House of Freedoms	11,676	29.73
Alfredo Monaci	Ind		2,941	7.49
Others			1,962	4.99
Eligible voters			47,619	100.00
Voted			41,204	86.53
Blank or invalid ballots			1,924	
Total valid votes			39,280	

=== Mayoral and City Council election, 2006 ===
The election took place on 28–29 May 2006.

Results

Summary of the 2006 Siena City Council election results
Parties and coalitions		Votes	%	Seats
Democrats of the Left (Democratici di Sinistra)	DS	9,589	29.67%	14
Democracy is Freedom – The Daisy (La Margherita)	DL	4,109	12.71%	6
Reformist List (Lista Riformista)	LR	3,074	9.51%	4
Communist Refoundation Party (Rifondazione Comunista)	PRC	1,951	6.04%	2
Others		1,269	3.93%	0
Cenni coalition (Centre-left)		19,992	61.85%	26
The Hot air balloon (La Mongolfiera)	LM	5,095	15.76%	7
Free Siena (Libera Siena)	LS	1,102	3.41%	1
Others		1,487	4.60%	1
Piccini coalition (Left-wing)		7,684	23.77%	9
Forza Italia	FI	1,917	5.93%	3
National Alliance (Alleanza Nazionale)	AN	1,674	5.18%	2
Others		634	1.96%	0
Manganelli coalition (Centre-right)		4,225	13.07%	5
Others		421	1.30%	0
Total		34,781	100%	40
Votes cast/turnout		35,802	78.21%	
Registered voters		45,775		
Source: Ministry of the Interior

Candidate	Party	Coalition	First round	
Candidate	Party	Coalition	Votes	%
Maurizio Cenni	DS	The Olive Tree	19,089	54.88
Pierluigi Piccini	Ind		10,792	31.03
Alessandro Manganelli	AN	House of Freedoms	4,440	12.77
Others			460	1.33
Eligible voters			45,775	100.00
Voted			35,802	78.21
Blank or invalid ballots			1,021	
Total valid votes			34,781	

=== Mayoral and City Council election, 2011 ===
The election took place on 15–16 May 2011.

Results

Summary of the 2011 Siena City Council election results
Parties and coalitions		Votes	%	Seats
Democratic Party (Partito Democratico)	PD	11,723	38.50%	15
Future Siena (Siena Futura)	SF	2,230	7.32%	3
Reformist List (Lista Roformista)	LR	2,167	7.12%	2
Left Ecology Freedom (Sinistra Ecologia Libertà)	SEL	1,397	4.59%	1
Others		1,401	4.60%	0
Ceccuzzi coalition (Centre-left)		18,918	62.12%	21
The People of Freedom (Il Popolo della Libertà)	PdL	4,346	14.27%	6
Lega Nord	LN	784	2.57%	0
Others		392	1.29%	0
Nannini coalition (Centre-right)		5,522	18.13%	6
New Pole for Siena (Nuovo Polo per Siena)	NPS	3,892	12.78%	4
The Left for Siena (La Sinistra per Siena)	SpS	1,287	4.23%	1
Others		833	2.74%	0
Total		30,432	100%	32
Votes cast/turnout		33,781	76.65%	
Registered voters		44,074		
Source: Ministry of the Interior

Candidate	Party	Coalition	First round	
Candidate	Party	Coalition	Votes	%
Franco Ceccuzzi	PD	PD-IdV-SEL-PSI-FdS	17,802	54.71
Alessandro Nannini	PdL	PdL-LN	5,933	18.23
Gabriele Corradi	Ind	NPI	5,445	16.73
Laura Vigni	SpS		2,203	6.77
Michele Pinassi	M5S		1,154	3.55
Eligible voters			44,074	100.00
Voted			33,781	78.21
Blank or invalid ballots			1,244	
Total valid votes			32,537	

=== Mayoral and City Council election, 2013 ===
The election took place in two rounds: the first on 26–27 May and the second on 9–10 June 2013.

Results

Summary of the 2013 Siena City Council election results
Parties and coalitions		Votes	%	Seats
Democratic Party (Partito Democratico)	PD	6,483	25.29%	12
Siena Changes (Siena Cambia)	SC	2,534	9.89%	5
Left Ecology Freedom (Sinistra Ecologia Libertà)	SEL	1,322	5.16%	2
Reformist List (Lista Roformista)	LR	613	2.39%	1
Valentini coalition (Centre-left)		10,592	42.73%	20
Black on White! (Nero su Bianco!)	NB	2,096	8.18%	3
Moderates for Siena (Moderati per Siena)	MpS	2,071	8.08%	2
Siena Rebirths! (Siena Rinasce!)	SR	1,091	4.26%	1
Brothers of Siena (Fratelli di Siena)	FdS	404	1.58%	0
Neri coalition (Centre-right)		5,662	22.09%	6
Five Star Movement (Movimento Cinque Stelle)	M5S	2,194	8.56%	1
The Left for Siena (La Sinistra per Siena)	SpS	734	2.86%	1
Communist Refoundation Party (Rifondazione Comunista)	PRC	725	2.83%	0
Others		465	1.81%	0
Vigni coalition (Left-wing)		1,924	7.51%	1
Others		4,901	19.12%	3
Total		30,432	100%	32
Votes cast/turnout		30,007	68.40%	
Registered voters		43,870		
Source: Ministry of the Interior

Candidate	Party	Coalition	First round		Second round	
Candidate	Party	Coalition	Votes	%	Votes	%
Bruno Valentini	PD	PD-SEL-PSI	11,520	39.54	12,076	52.00
Eugenio Neri	Ind	PdL-FdI	6,809	23.37	11,146	48.00
Laura Vigni	SpS	PRC-SpS	2,999	10.29		
Michele Pinassi	M5S		2,494	8.56		
Enrico Tucci	Ind		1,936	6.65		
Marco Falorni	Ind		1,486	5.10		
Mauro Marzucchi	Ind		1,417	4.86		
Alessandro Corsini	Ind		472	1.62		
Eligible voters			43,870	100.00	43,870	100.00
Voted			30,007	68.40	24,119	54.98
Blank or invalid ballots			874		897	
Total valid votes			29,133		23,222	

=== Mayoral and City Council election, 2018 ===
The election took place in two rounds: the first on 10 June and the second on 24 June 2018.

Results

Summary of the 2018 Siena City Council election results
Parties and coalitions		Votes	%	Seats
Democratic Party (Partito Democratico)	PD	4,543	18.35%	4
Valentini for Mayor (Valentini Sindaco)	VS	2,317	9.36%	1
Valentini coalition (Centre-left)		6,860	27.71%	5
Lega		2,237	9.04%	8
De Mossi for Mayor (De Mossi Sindaco)	DMS	1,856	7.50%	6
Brothers of Italy (Fratelli d'Italia)	FdI	883	3.57%	3
Forza Italia	FI	830	3.35%	3
De Mossi coalition (Centre-right)		5,806	23.45%	(Note: Even if the coalition didn't receive the majority of votes, no other alliance was able to obtain overall more than 50% of votes. Once its mayoral candidate won the second round, the coalition was awarded the majority bonus granted to the alliance whose candidate is elected mayor.)20
For Siena (Per Siena)	PS	4,834	19.53%	4
Black on White! (Nero su Bianco!)	NB	4,478	18.09%	3
Others		2,780	11.23%	0
Total		24,758	100%	32
Votes cast/turnout		27,356	63.08%	
Registered voters		43,365		
Source: Ministry of the Interior

Candidate	Party	Coalition	First round		Second round	
Candidate	Party	Coalition	Votes	%	Votes	%
Bruno Valentini	PD		7,237	27.41	11,687	49.20
Luigi De Mossi	Ind	Lega-FdI-FI	6,400	24.24	12,065	50.80
Pierluigi Piccini	Ind		5,617	21.27		
Massimo Sportelli	Ind		4,223	15.99		
Alessandro Vigni	SpS	SI-PaP-SpS	1,029	3.90		
Others			1,901	7.19		
Eligible voters			43,365	100.00	43,365	100.00
Voted			27,356	63.08	24,369	56.20
Blank or invalid ballots			949		617	
Total valid votes			26,407		23,752	

=== Mayoral and City Council election, 2023 ===
The election took place in two rounds: the first on 14–15 May and the second on 28–29 May 2023.

Results

Summary of the 2023 Siena City Council election results
Parties and coalitions		Votes	%	Seats
Brothers of Italy (Fratelli d'Italia)	FdI	3,741	14.80%	11
Fabio for Mayor (Fabio Sindaco)	FS	1,721	6.81%	5
Lega		979	3.87%	2
Forza Italia	FI	830	3.28%	2
Others		335	1.33%	0
Fabio coalition (Centre-right)		7,606	30.09%	20
Democratic Party (Partito Democratico)	PD	4,983	19.71%	5
Ferretti for Mayor (Ferretti Sindaco)	FS	1,548	6.12%	1
Italian Left (Sinistra Italiana)	SI	807	3.19%	0
Ferretti coalition (Centre-left)		7,338	29.03%	6
For Siena (Per Siena)	PS	5,436	21.25%	4
Italia Viva	IV	2,182	8.63%	1
Montomoli for Mayor (Montomoli Sindaco)	MS	1,683	6.66%	1
Others		1,032	4.08%	0
Total		25,277	100%	32
Votes cast/turnout		27,674	63.82%	
Registered voters		43,364		
Source: Ministry of the Interior

Candidate	Party	Coalition	First round		Second round	
Candidate	Party	Coalition	Votes	%	Votes	%
Nicoletta Fabio	Ind	FdI-Lega-FI-UDC	8,249	30.51	12,545	52.16
Anna Ferretti	PD	PD-SI-PSI	7,773	28.75	11,508	47.84
Fabio Pacciani	Ind		6,123	22.65		
Massimo Castagnini	Ind	IV	1,945	7.19		
Emanuele Montomoli	Ind	+E	1,837	6.79		
Elena Boldrini	M5S		403	1.49		
Alessandro Bisogni	Ind	PRC-PaP	380	1.41		
Roberto Bozzi	A		329	1.22		
Eligible voters			43,364	100.00	43,364	100.00
Voted			27,674	63.82	24,701	56.96
Blank or invalid ballots			635		648	
Total valid votes			27,039		24,053	

== See also ==
- Timeline of Siena

== Bibliography ==
- Bisi, Stefano (2012). Sindaci in bianco-nero. Appunti di un cronista. Siena: Betti Editrice. ISBN 978-88-7576-271-1.
