= Francesco Persiani =

Italian politician (born 1965)

Mayor of Massa
- In office 31 May 2023 – Incumbent
- In office 26 June 2018 – 3 March 2023
- Preceded by: Alessandro Volpi

Personal details
- Born: 29 November 1965 (age 60) La Spezia, Italy
- Party: Lega
- Education: University of Florence
- Profession: Lawyer

Francesco Persiani (born 29 November 1965) is an Italian politician. A member of Lega, he is the mayor of Massa since June 2018. In March 2023, he resigned after the city council passed a motion of no confidence but was re-elected in May 2023.

== Early life and career ==
Born in La Spezia, Persiani was raised in Verona and became a lawyer graduating at University of Florence. He lived in Massa, Tuscany, since 1988. In 1995, he opened his own law firm in Massa. In 2016, he became president of the criminal chamber of the province of Massa-Carrara.

== Mayor of Massa ==
In 2018, Persiani ran for mayor of Massa, supported by the centre-right coalition formed by Lega, Forza Italia, and Brothers of Italy. After finishing second in the first round with 28.18% of the votes, he won in the runoff on 24 June 2018 with 56.62% of the votes, defeating the centre-left coalition outgoing mayor Alessandro Volpi, and becoming the first right-wing mayor of Massa in the history of the Italian Republic and the first centre-right coalition candidate since the introduction of direct elections. He took office on 26 June 2018.

On 1 March 2023, Persiani was ousted by the city council with 19 votes in favour, including four votes coming from Brothers of Italy members, and was therefore forced to resign from the office of mayor two days later. Having run again with the support of the centre-right coalition except for Brothers of Italy, this time finishing first in the first round with 35.42% of the votes, he was re-elected as mayor of Massa in the second round with 54.36%, beating his centre-left coalition challenger Enzo Ricci.

== See also ==
- 2018 Italian local elections
- 2023 Italian local elections

Political offices
Preceded by Alessandro Volpi	Mayor of Massa since 2018	Succeeded by
