= Renzo Masoero =

Italian politician (born 1964)

President of the Province of Vercelli
- In office 11 June 2002 – 29 March 2010
- Preceded by: Giulio Baltaro
- Succeeded by: Carlo Riva Vercellotti

Mayor of Livorno Ferraris
- In office 14 June 2004 – 9 March 2010
- Preceded by: Giovanni Franco Giuliano
- Succeeded by: Marco Michelone

Personal details
- Born: 16 February 1964 (age 62) Vercelli, Italy
- Party: National Alliance; Forza Italia; Brothers of Italy

Renzo Masoero (born 16 February 1964) is an Italian politician who served as president of the Province of Vercelli from 2002 to 2010. He also served as mayor of Livorno Ferraris from 2004 to 2010.

== Life and career ==
Masoero was elected to the Provincial Council of Vercelli in 1995 as a member of National Alliance. From 1999 to 2002, he served as provincial assessor for the Environment and Public Works and as vice president of the province under president Giulio Baltaro.

In the 2002 provincial election, Masoero was elected president of the Province of Vercelli as the candidate of the centre-right House of Freedoms coalition, defeating centre-left candidate Gianni Mentigazzi in the runoff with 52.69% of the vote. In the 2007 provincial election, he was re-elected in the first round with 66.73% of the vote. In 2004, he was also elected mayor of Livorno Ferraris.

In February 2010, Masoero was arrested on charges of extortion after allegedly requesting money from an entrepreneur in connection with public contracts. He subsequently resigned as president of the Province of Vercelli and mayor of Livorno Ferraris. On 7 April 2010, he entered a plea bargain and was sentenced to 24 months' imprisonment for three counts of extortion, with the sentence suspended.

In 2024, he was appointed to the board of ATC Piemonte Nord as a representative of Brothers of Italy.
