= Carlo Riva Vercellotti =

Italian politician (born 1970)

Member of the Regional Council of Piedmont
- Incumbent
- Assumed office 10 June 2019

President of the Province of Vercelli
- In office 1 June 2011 – 9 August 2016
- Preceded by: Renzo Masoero
- Succeeded by: Eraldo Botta

Mayor of Gattinara
- In office 30 May 2006 – 16 May 2011
- Preceded by: Mario Mantovani
- Succeeded by: Daniele Baglione

Personal details
- Born: 5 July 1970 (age 56) Novara, Piedmont, Italy
- Party: Forza Italia; The People of Freedom; Forza Italia; Brothers of Italy
- Education: University of Turin
- Occupation: Entrepreneur

Carlo Riva Vercellotti (born 5 July 1970) is an Italian politician serving as a member of the Regional Council of Piedmont since 2019. He also served as president of the Province of Vercelli from 2011 to 2016.

== Life and career ==
Riva Vercellotti was born in Novara and grew up in Gattinara, in a family of textile entrepreneurs. He has lived in Vercelli since 2012. He graduated in political science from the University of Turin.

A member of Forza Italia since 1994, Riva Vercellotti served as a municipal councillor and assessor in Gattinara and as a provincial assessor of the Province of Vercelli. He was mayor of Gattinara from 2006 to 2011 and president of the Province of Vercelli from 2011 to 2019, being re-elected in 2016.

In 2019, Riva Vercellotti was elected to the Regional Council of Piedmont and the Vercelli City Council for Forza Italia. He joined Brothers of Italy in 2021. He was re-elected to the Regional Council in 2024.
