= Giorgio Brandolin =

Italian politician (born 1951)

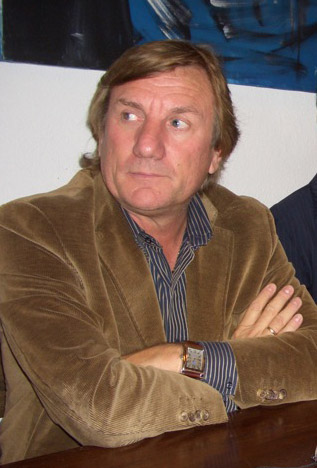

Member of the Chamber of Deputies
- In office 15 March 2013 – 22 March 2018
- Constituency: Friuli-Venezia Giulia

Member of the Regional Council of Friuli-Venezia Giulia
- In office 6 May 2008 – 14 March 2013
- Constituency: Gorizia

President of the Province of Gorizia
- In office 12 May 1997 – 23 April 2006
- Preceded by: Monica Marcolini
- Succeeded by: Enrico Gherghetta

Personal details
- Born: 23 April 1951 (age 75) Monfalcone, Province of Gorizia, Italy
- Party: Democrats of the Left; Democratic Party
- Profession: Engineer

Giorgio Brandolin (born 23 April 1951) is an Italian politician who served as president of the Province of Gorizia (1997–2006), member of the Regional Council of Friuli-Venezia Giulia (2008–2013) and member of the Chamber of Deputies from 2013 to 2018.
