= Aldo Bulzoni =

Italian politician and professor

Mayor of Caserta
- In office 5 December 1993 – 1 December 1997
- Preceded by: Giuseppe Gasparin
- Succeeded by: Luigi Falco

Personal details
- Born: 25 August 1942 (age 84) Palermo, Italy
- Party: Independent
- Occupation: Professor

Aldo Bulzoni (born 25 August 1942) is an Italian politician and professor.

He is current member of the Independent Party. He has served as Mayor of Caserta from 1993 to 1997. He was nominated for the 1993 administration as an Independent. He was elected mayor of Caserta.

== Biography ==
Aldo Bulzoni was born in Palermo, Italy on 1942. He was diocesan president of Catholic Action in Caserta. He was a high school teacher. He worked at the catholic high school as a physics teacher.

== See also ==
- List of mayors of Caserta

Political offices
| Preceded by Giuseppe Gasparin | Mayor of Caserta; 5 December 1993—1 December 1997 | Succeeded by Luigi Falco |
