= Maurizio Cenni =

Italian politician

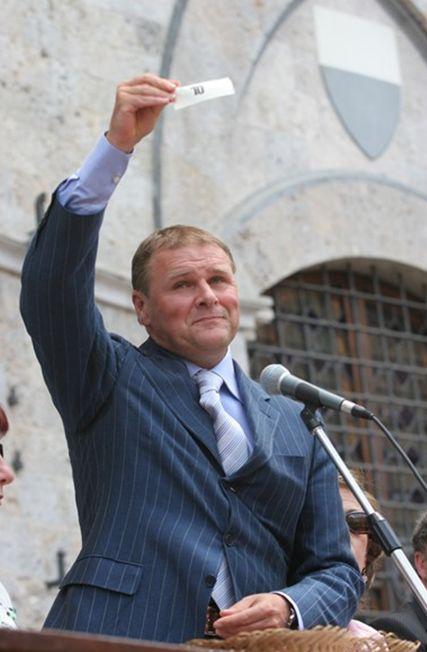

Mayor of Siena
- In office 14 May 2001 – 18 May 2011
- Preceded by: Pierluigi Piccini
- Succeeded by: Franco Ceccuzzi

Personal details
- Born: 12 January 1955 (age 71) Siena, Tuscany, Italy
- Party: Italian Communist Party (1973-1991); Democratic Party of the Left (1991-1998); Democrats of the Left (1998-2007); Democratic Party (2007-2012)
- Education: University of Siena
- Profession: bank employee

Maurizio Cenni (born 12 January 1955 in Siena) is an Italian politician.

Cenni started his political career as a municipal councillor in Siena in 1993. He was elected Mayor of Siena on 14 May 2001 and re-elected for a second term on 30 May 2006.

== Biography ==
Born and raised in Siena, he graduated from the “Santa Caterina” teacher training college and earned a degree in economics and banking from the University of Siena in 1979. In 1979, he was hired by Banca Monte dei Paschi di Siena: after working at the branches in Amalfi, Latina, and Florence, he became, following the end of his political career, deputy director of the bank’s debt collection company in 2012.

Between 1994 and 1997, as a city council member appointed by the mayor, he served on the board of directors of Siena FC SSD.

A member of the Contrade of Siena del Nicchio, Maurizio Cenni is married and has two children.

== See also ==
- 2001 Italian local elections
- 2006 Italian local elections
- List of mayors of Siena

Political offices
Preceded by Pierluigi Piccini	Mayor of Siena; 2001–2011	Succeeded by Franco Ceccuzzi
