= 2018 Italian local elections =

The 2018 Italian local elections were held on different dates; most on 10 June, with a second round on 24 June. In Italy, direct elections were held in 720 municipalities: in each comune were chosen mayor and members of the City Council. Of the 783 municipalities, 21 were provincial capitals and only 112 had a population higher than 15,000 inhabitants (10,000 for Sicily).

In Friuli-Venezia Giulia the elections were held on 29 April with a second ballot on 13 May; while in Aosta Valley they were held on 20 May, and in Trentino-Alto Adige/Südtirol on 27 May.

== Voting System ==
All mayoral elections in Italy in cities with a population higher than 15,000 use the same voting system. Under this system voters express a direct choice for the mayor or an indirect choice voting for the party of the candidate's coalition. If no candidate receives at least 50% of votes, the top two candidates go to a second round after two weeks. This gives a result whereby the winning candidate may be able to claim majority support, although it is not guaranteed.

The election of the City Council is based on a direct choice for the candidate with a preference vote: the candidate with the majority of the preferences is elected. The number of the seats for each party is determined proportionally.

== Municipal elections ==
=== Overall results ===
Majority of each coalition in the 112 municipalities (comuni) with a population higher than 15,000:

Coalition	Comuni
Centre-right coalition	43
Centre-left coalition	27
Five Star Movement	5
Independents and others	35

By party

Party results in the main municipalities:

Party	%
Democratic Party	13.6%
Five Star Movement	11.5%
League	10.9%
Forza Italia	6.0%
Brothers of Italy	3.6%
Free and Equal	0.9%
Centre-right civic lists	13.6%
Centre-left civic lists	12.4%

=== Mayoral election results ===
Centre-left coalition
Centre-right coalition
Five Star Movement
Civic lists
Right-wing coalition
Left-wing coalition
Prefectural commissioner

Region	City	Population	Incumbent mayor	Elected mayor	1st round		2nd round		Seats	Source
Region	City	Population	Incumbent mayor	Elected mayor	Votes	%	Votes	%	Seats	Source
Lombardy	Brescia	196,745	Emilio Del Bono (PD)	Emilio Del Bono (PD)	44,237	53,86%	—	—	20 / 32	
Lombardy	Sondrio	21,558	Alcide Molteni (PD)	Marco Scaramellini (Ind.)	4,923	46.80%	5,437	60.37%	20 / 32	
Veneto	Treviso	84.669	Giovanni Manildo (PD)	Mario Conte (LSP)	21,836	54.48%	—	—	20 / 32	
Veneto	Vicenza	111.980	Achille Variati (PD)	Francesco Rucco (Ind.)	24,271	50.63%	—	—	20 / 32	
Friuli-Venezia Giulia	Udine	99,242	Furio Honsell (Ind.)	Pietro Fontanini (LSP)	18,619	41.49%	18,830	50.37%	24 / 40	
Liguria	Imperia	42.328	Carlo Capacci (Ind.)	Claudio Scajola (Ind.)	7,397	35.28%	8,136	52.05%	20 / 32	
Tuscany	Massa	68.946	Alessandro Volpi (PD)	Francesco Persiani (LSP)	9,916	28.18%	17,830	56.62%	20 / 32	
Tuscany	Pisa	90.408	Marco Filippeschi (PD)	Michele Conti (Ind.)	13,795	33.36%	20,692	52.29%	20 / 32	
Tuscany	Siena	53.772	Bruno Valentini (PD)	Luigi De Mossi (Ind.)	6,400	24.23%	12,065	50.80%	20 / 32	
Umbria	Terni	111.317	Antonino Cufalo (Note: Prefectural commissioner replacing mayor Leopoldo Di Girolamo (Democratic Party) since 22 February 2018)	Leonardo Latini (LSP)	25,531	49.22%	26,185	63.42%	20 / 32	
Marche	Ancona	100,861	Valeria Mancinelli (PD)	Valeria Mancinelli (PD)	20,738	47.92%	21,152	62.78%	20 / 32	
Lazio	Viterbo	67.619	Leonardo Michelini (Ind.)	Giovanni Arena (FI)	13,022	40.22%	12,377	51.09%	20 / 32	
Abruzzo	Teramo	54,436	Luigi Pizzi (Note: Prefectural commissioner replacing mayor Maurizio Brucchi (Forza Italia) since 4 December 2017)	Gianguido D'Alberto (Ind.)	6,492	21.13%	12,205	53.26%	20 / 32	
Campania	Avellino	54.515	Paolo Foti (PD)	Vincenzo Ciampi (M5S)	6,535	20.22%	13,694	59.54%	5 / 32	
Apulia	Barletta	94,489	Pasquale Cascella (PD)	Cosimo Cannito (Ind.)	26,587	53.03%	—	—	20 / 32	
Apulia	Brindisi	87,534	Santi Giuffrè (Note: Prefectural commissioner replacing mayor Angela Carluccio (CoR) since 26 May 2017)	Riccardo Rossi (Ind.)	10,253	23.49%	16,658	56.61%	20 / 32	
Sicily	Catania	311,763	Enzo Bianco (PD)	Salvo Pogliese (FI)	69,029	52.33%	—	—	23 / 35	
Sicily	Messina	234,758	Renato Accorinti (Ind.)	Cateno De Luca (SV)	23,616	19.81%	47,835	65.28%	0 / 32	
Sicily	Ragusa	73.631	Federico Piccitto (M5S)	Giuseppe Cassì (Ind.)	7,295	20.83%	13,492	53.07%	14 / 24	
Sicily	Syracuse	121,933	Giancarlo Garozzo (PD)	Francesco Italia (Ind.)	10,626	19.62%	18,210	52.99%	9 / 32	
Sicily	Trapani	68,370	Francesco Messineo (Note: Prefectural commissioner since July 2017, as the quorum was not reached at 2017 municipal election.)	Giacomo Tranchida (PD)	24,052	70.68%	—	—	19 / 24	
