= Sergio Merusi =

Italian politician (1942–2026)

Sergio Merusi (9 February 1943 – 14 March 2026) was an Italian politician and economist.

== Life and career ==
Merusi was born on 9 February 1943. He served as the mayor of Novara from 1993 to 1997, as a member of Lega Nord, after being elected during the 1993 Italian local elections.

In the subsequent municipal elections of 1997, he was not selected by Lega Nord, but represented himself, obtaining 4.5% of the votes and being elected a municipal councillor.

Merusi died on 14 March 2026, at the age of 83.
