= Pio Del Gaudio =

Italian politician (born 1967)

Mayor of Caserta
- In office 18 May 2011 – 3 June 2015
- Preceded by: Nicodemo Petteruti
- Succeeded by: Carlo Marino

Personal details
- Born: 24 April 1967 (age 59) Caserta, Campania, Italy
- Party: Forza Italia
- Occupation: Chartered accountant

Pio Del Gaudio (born 24 April 1967, in Caserta, Italy) is an Italian politician and chartered accountant.

He is a member of the Forza Italia party. He was elected to the city council in 2006 and ran for mayor of Caserta in the 2011 municipal elections. He served as Mayor of Caserta from 2011 to 2015.

== Biography ==
A certified public accountant by profession, he entered politics as a member of the National Alliance (Italy), winning election to the Caserta City Council in the 1997 municipal elections and again in the 2002 elections, also serving as a council member in the second administration led by Luigi Falco. In 2006, he was re-elected to the City Council.

He ran for mayor of Caserta in the 2011 municipal elections, backed by the The People of Freedom, the Union of the Centre (2002), the New PSI, the Movement for Autonomy, and civic slates. He was elected mayor in the first round with 52.64% of the vote, defeating the center-left candidate Carlo Marino.

An internal crisis within the city council led to the resignation of eighteen council members, culminating in the dissolution of the council and Del Gaudio’s removal from office on June 3, 2015.

After leaving Forza Italia, he ran again for mayor in the 2021 municipal elections, this time backed not by the center-right but by seven civic lists, Vittorio Sgarbi, and the Italian Republican Party; he received 12.97% of the vote and did not advance to the runoff.

== See also ==
- List of mayors of Caserta

Political offices
Preceded by Nicodemo Petteruti	Mayor of Caserta; 18 May 2011—3 June 2015	Succeeded by Carlo Marino
