= Enrico Gherghetta =

Italian politician (born 1957)

President of the Province of Gorizia
- In office 23 April 2006 – 1 December 2016
- Preceded by: Giorgio Brandolin
- Succeeded by: Office abolished

Member of the Regional Council of Friuli-Venezia Giulia
- In office 13 October 1998 – 2 May 2006

Personal details
- Born: 26 March 1957 (age 69) Rijeka, Yugoslavia
- Party: PCI (until 1991); PDS (1991–1998); DS (1998–2007); PD (since 2007)
- Education: University of Trieste
- Occupation: Technical designer

Enrico Gherghetta (born 26 March 1957) is an Italian politician who served as president of the Province of Gorizia from 2006 to 2016 and as a member of the Regional Council of Friuli-Venezia Giulia from 1998 to 2008.

== Early life and education ==
Gherghetta was born in Rijeka, Yugolsavia, and grew up in Monfalcone, province of Gorizia, Italy, in a working-class family. At the age of 16, he began working in a factory while becoming involved in trade union and political activities. He later obtained a diploma as an electrical technician and worked as a technical designer for Enel from 1981.

He initially studied history at the University of Trieste before interrupting his studies. In 2021, he graduated in political science from the same university.

== Political career ==
Gherghetta joined the Italian Communist Party and subsequently became a member of the Democratic Party of the Left and the Democrats of the Left, becoming provincial secretary in 1999.

He was elected to the municipal council of Monfalcone and, in 1997, to the Provincial Council of Gorizia. In 1998, he resigned from the provincial council after being elected to the Regional Council of Friuli-Venezia Giulia, where he served for two terms.

In 2006, Gherghetta was elected president of the Province of Gorizia, defeating the centre-right candidate Leonardo Zappalà in the runoff with 58.86% of the vote. He was supported by a centre-left coalition comprising The Olive Tree, Communist Refoundation Party, Federation of the Greens, Italy of Values, Party of Italian Communists and the Pensioners' Party. He was re-elected president in 2011, winning 52.81% of the vote in the first round.

Gherghetta strongly opposed the abolition of the provinces in Friuli-Venezia Giulia under regional law no. 26/2014. The Province of Gorizia was subsequently abolished in 2016, ending his presidency.

From 2021 to 2023, Gherghetta served as a municipal councillor in San Pier d'Isonzo after failing the mayoral election.
