= Maria Teresa Bassa Poropat =

Italian politician

President of the Province of Trieste
- In office 26 April 2006 – 1 December 2016
- Preceded by: Fabio Scoccimarro
- Succeeded by: Office abolished

Member of the Regional Council of Friuli-Venezia Giulia
- In office 1 July 2003 – 27 April 2006

Personal details
- Born: 23 November 1946 Trieste, Italy
- Education: University of Trieste

Maria Teresa Bassa Poropat (born 23 November 1946) is an Italian politician, who served as a President of the Province of Trieste from 24 April 2006 to 31 December 2016. She graduated in psychology at the University of Trieste, specialized in psychopedagogy at the University of Turin, and taught at the Faculty of Psychology of the University of Trieste. She was a private judge of the juvenile court of the province of Trieste. Then, she was Councilor for Education, Youth and Equal Opportunities of the Municipality of Trieste from 1996 to 2001. She was a Regional Councilor of Friuli-Venezia Giulia from 1 July 2003 to 27 April 2006.
