= Federico Gentile =

Italian publisher (1904–1996)

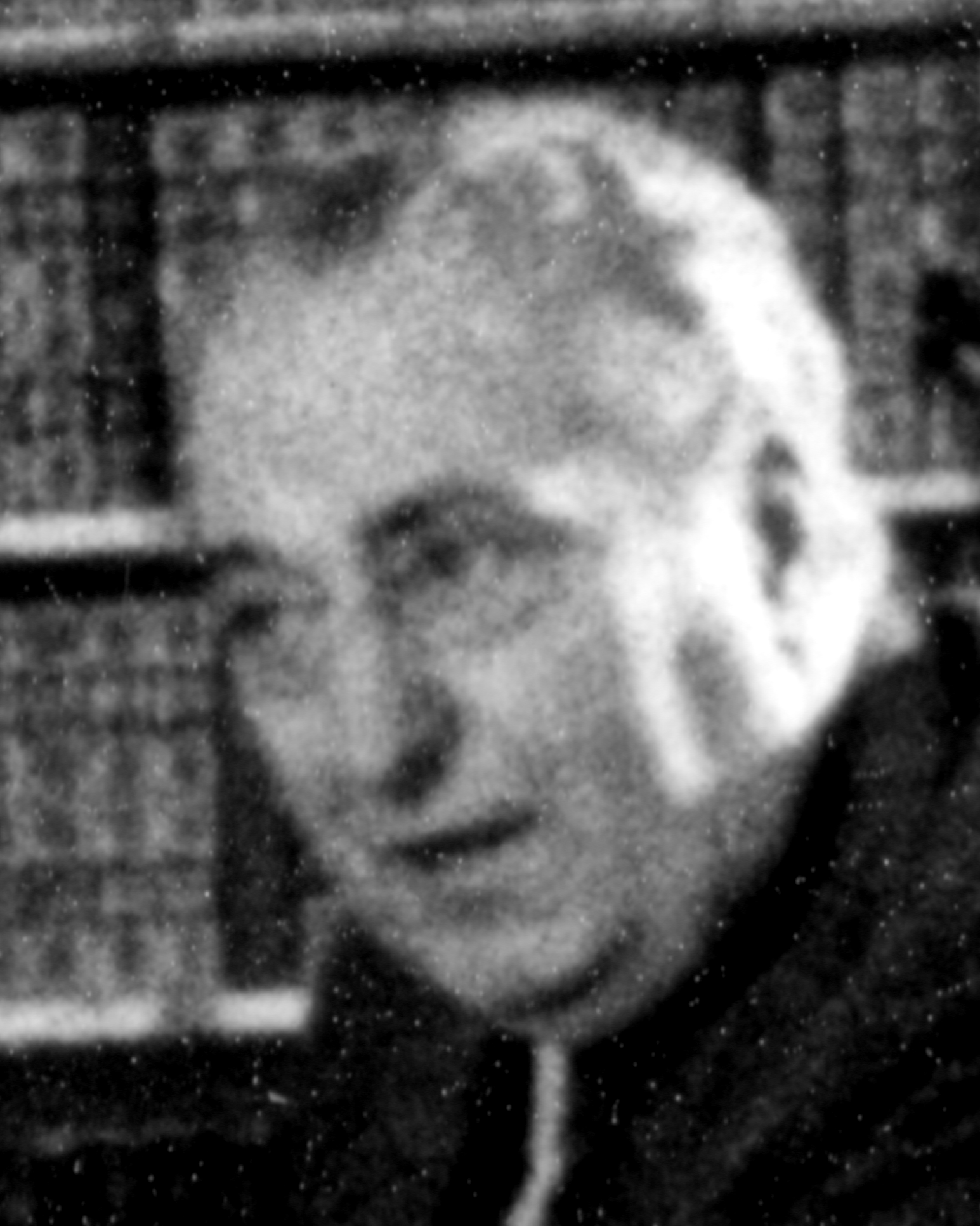
Federico Gentile

Federico Gentile (14 April 1904 – 21 May 1996) was an Italian publisher. Gentile is best remembered for founding the publishing company Le Lettere, that he created after many years at the helm of Sansoni, which was acquired by Giovanni Gentile (the philosopher and Federico's father) who entrusted it to his son in 1932.

== Early life ==
Second son of the philosopher Giovanni and Erminia Nudi, he graduated in 1925 from the University of Rome with a thesis on Blaise Pascal which two years later, rewritten after a period of study in Paris, was published by Laterza.

Returning from France, Gentile was hired at the Treves publishing house in Milan, as secretary general until 1932 and as director of the Library of political culture, where he published, among others, works by his father, Gioacchino Volpe, Ugo Spirito and Ruggero Bonghi.

== Sansoni ==
In September 1932 his father took control of the Sansoni publishing house in Florence (later becoming its sole owner in 1935) and entrusted it to Federico Gentile, together with his younger brother Fortunato, helped by other prominent authors and collaborators, based on the model of the Enciclopedia Italiana: Ruggero Bonghi, Alessandro D'Ancona, Robert Davidsohn, Ferdinando Martini, Ernesto Parodi, Ermenegildo Pistelli, Pio Rajna, Francesco Torraca, Georg Voigt and others. In the same year Federico Gentile married Anna Maria Grelling, from whom he had Giovanni, Nicoletta and Giorgio.

With him the number of published works increased, although it collapsed in 1945 following the war and the dramatic events of 1944 that led to the violent death of his father, the philosopher, who remained loyal to fascism. In 1933 alone the catalog of the publishing house was enriched with seven new series. At the end of Federico Gentile's Sansoni there would be about thirty series, including Roberto Longhi's Paragone.

Like his father, Federico Gentile adhered to fascism, but already by the end of the 1930s he was working with figures opposed to fascism or on the way to become such, such as Mario Bonfantini, Guido Calogero, Lavinia Mazzucchetti, Carlo Muscetta, and Delio Cantimori.

== Fall of fascism and new beginning ==
Federico Gentile volunteered in the war as an artillery captain ending up prisoner in Poland. With the fall of Fascism, the death of two of Federico's brothers ensued, as well as his father (April 15, 1944) and his mother (January 1945). The publishing house was then placed under commissioner management, excluding the Gentile family. In 1945, however, the Parri government allowed him to regain control of Sansoni, and little by little other authors such as Migliorini, Devoto, Omodeo, Longhi, Salmi, Calogero, Saitta, Praz, Russo, Contini, Bausani and many others were added. In 1946, from the 34 titles of the previous year it increased to 144, to settle on an average of about 70 per year.

Federico was the son of the creator of the Italian Encyclopedia, inheriting the passion for encyclopedias. Thus were born such impressive works as Enciclopedia Cattolica ("Catholic Encyclopedia"), Enciclopedia medica italiana ("Medical Italian Encyclopedia"), Enciclopedia dello Spettacolo ("Encyclopedia of Performing Arts"), Enciclopedia filosofica ("Encyclopedia of Philosophy"), Enciclopedia Universale dell'arte ("Universal Encyclopedia of Art"), Il Leonardo: Enciclopedia delle scienze e delle tecniche ("Leonardo: Encyclopedia of science and technology"), and the Dizionario Enciclopedico Sansoni ("Encyclopedic Dictionary Sansoni").

== Le Lettere ==
As the Italian book publishing industry tested the importance of the business of kiosks (Italian: edicole), Sansoni produced such popular pocket-size series as Galileo. Enciclopedia delle scienze e delle tecniche, Enciclopedia della pesca, Enciclopedia della caccia, Il mondo in cucina. Enciclopedia gastronomica, Enciclopedia dei fumetti and Grande Enciclopedia degli Animali. It also produced two successful bilingual dictionaries of English and German. In the 1970s, Sansoni suffered a crisis that sent it to temporary receivership, and on 28 June 1978 the Gentile family sold the company to Rizzoli. However, Federico Gentile was able to found the publishing company Le Lettere, still active today.

Founded together with his son Giovanni (born in Florence in 1938), who shared his name with his grandfather, the publishing house took over much of the Sansoni's publications, and took over the publishing of the complete works of Giovanni Gentile. Among the journals published by Le Lettere are Eugenio Garin's Giornale critico della filosofia italiana, Ghinassi's Lingua nostra, Walter Binni's La rassegna della letteratura italiana, and Francesco Mazzoni's Studi danteschi. The company also publishes the annual bulletins of the Accademia della Crusca, and has series on philosophy, linguistics, narrative, and poetry. It also publishes the national edition of the complete works of Dante Alighieri.

== Sources ==
- Orazio Pugliese, «Gentile Editore…». I libri della Sansoni nelle memorie dei suoi protagonisti, 2016, Florence, Phasar Edizioni, ISBN 978-8863583809.
- AA. VV., Testimonianze per un centenario. Contributi a una storia della cultura italiana 1873 - 1973, 1974, Florence, Sansoni.
- Gianfranco Pedullà, Il mercato delle idee. Giovanni Gentile e la Casa editrice Sansoni, 1986, Bologna, Il mulino.
- Ghino Ghinassi, La scomparsa di Federico Gentile, in Lingua Nostra, 2 - 3, June September 1996.
- Benedetto Gentile, Ricordi e affetti, 1988, p. 89, Florence, Le Lettere.
- Federico Gentile, L’amicizia con Russo, in Belfagor, Scritti su Luigi Russo, anno XVI, n. 6, D’Anna, Messina-Florence, 1961.
