= Gioacchino Volpe =

Italian historian and politician

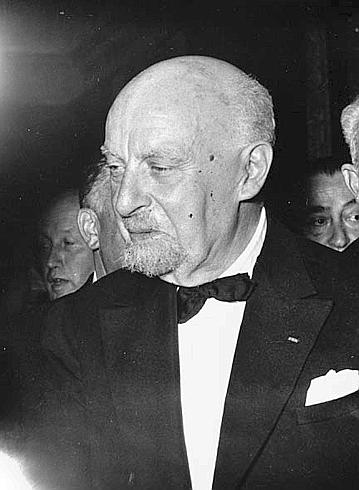
- Gioacchino Volpe

General Secretary of the Royal Academy of Italy
- In office 18 March 1929 – 1934
- Monarch: Victor Emmanuel III

Member of the Chamber of Deputies
- In office 24 May 1924 – 21 January 1929

Personal details
- Born: 16 February 1876 Paganica, Kingdom of Italy
- Died: 1 October 1971 (aged 95) Santarcangelo di Romagna, Italy
- Party: National List (1924-1929)
- Education: University of Pisa
- Occupation: Historian

Academic work
- School or tradition: Neo-Hegelianism
- Notable students: Federico Chabod; Delio Cantimori
- Main interests: Middle Ages; Contemporary history
- Notable works: L'Italia moderna (1949-1952)

Signature
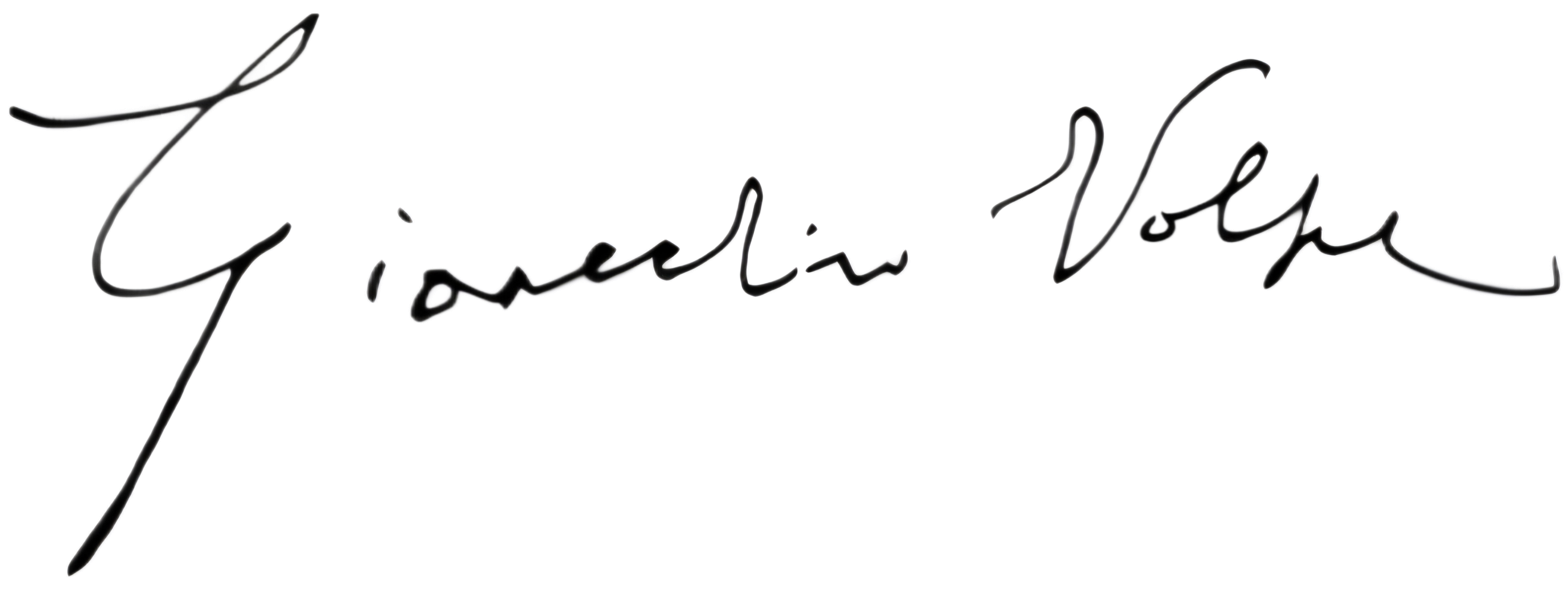

Gioacchino Volpe (16 February 1876 – 1 October 1971) was an Italian historian and politician. He was general secretary of the Royal Academy of Italy from 1929 to 1934, and a member of the Accademia dei Lincei from 1935 to 1946. Between 1924 and 1940 he was professor of modern history at the Sapienza University of Rome.

== Biography ==
=== Early life and education ===
Volpe was born in Paganica, L'Aquila, on 16 February 1876. In 1895, he entered the University of Pisa, where he graduated in Letters in 1899. While in Pisa, he befriended Giovanni Gentile and Giuseppe Lombardo Radice. In 1906 onwards, he was appointed professor of modern history at the Scientific-Literary Academy of Milan.

A nationalist, he served as an officer in World War I, and was awarded the Silver Medal of Military Valor. Before, during and after the war, he played an active role in Italian political and cultural debates.

In 1919, Volpe was one of the signatories of the manifesto of the Gruppo Nazionale Liberale Romano, alongside Gentile and Luigi Einaudi. The manifesto called for a strong central government with broad powers capable of radically reforming the state, and rejected the democratic reforms proposed by the Italian Prime Minister, Francesco Saverio Nitti, defined as 'unfit to protect the supreme interests of the nation'.

=== Fascism ===
Volpe became associated with Fascism during the immediate post-war period. He was elected to the Italian parliament on the National List in 1924, and the following year he signed the Manifesto of the Fascist Intellectuals. During the Fascist regime, he played a leading role. From 1924 to 1940, he was a professor of modern history at the Sapienza University of Rome. He directed the School of Modern and Contemporary History until 1943, and was director of the medieval and modern history section of the Enciclopedia Italiana from 1925 to 1937. He was general secretary of the Royal Academy of Italy from 1929 to 1934, and a member of the Accademia dei Lincei from 1935 to 1946.

=== Post-war period ===
After the Greco-Italian War, Volpe's attitude towards fascism gradually became critical and distant. After the Armistice of Cassibile, he did not join the Italian Social Republic, remaining loyal to King Victor Emmanuel III. He withdrew from public life and settled in Santarcangelo di Romagna, where he remained until the end of World War II. After the war, he was dismissed from his position at the university due to his role during the Fascist period. His ostracism from academic culture caused him considerable frustration and forced him into silence. However, he did not abandon his historical research, instead focusing on completing his magnum opus on the history of modern Italy. From exile, Umberto II of Italy awarded him the Civil Order of Savoy for his scientific achievements.

Volpe died in Santarcangelo di Romagna on 1 October 1971.

=== Historical work ===
At the beginning of his career, Volpe's historiographical interests were primarily focused on the medieval commune and the social conflicts within it. Influenced by the thought of Antonio Labriola and Gaetano Salvemini, he was one of the first historians to incorporate economic and social factors into the study of the Middle Ages. After World War I, his focus shifted from socio-economic issues to political ones. His attention gradually shifted from the Middle Ages, on which he continued to write, to contemporary history. His magnum opus is widely regarded as the monumental three-volume work L'Italia moderna (Modern Italy), published between 1949 and 1952.

== Sources and further reading ==
- Perini, Leandro (1968). "Gioacchino Volpe e Delio Cantimori". Annali della Scuola Normale Superiore di Pisa. Lettere, Storia e Filosofia. 37 (3/4): 241–248. JSTOR 24300231.
- Cossalter, Fabrizio (2002). "Uno storico e le sue carte: Gioacchino Volpe a Santarcangelo di Romagna". Contemporanea. 5 (4): 793–799. JSTOR 24652045.
- Cervelli, Innocenzo (2008). Gli Storici: Gioacchino Volpe. Naples: Guida. ISBN 8860425751.
- Cavina, Paola; Grilli, Lorenzo (2008). Gaetano Salvemini e Gioacchino Volpe: dalla storia medievale alla storia contemporanea. Pisa: Edizioni della Normale. ISBN 8876422188.
- Di Rienzo, Eugenio (2008). La storia e l'azione: vita politica di Gioacchino Volpe. Florence: Le Lettere. ISBN 8860871069.
- Bonuglia, Roberto (2007). Gioacchino Volpe tra passato e presente. Rome: Aracne. ISBN 8854814121.
- Di Rienzo, Eugenio (2013). "Volpe, Gioacchino". Il Contributo italiano alla storia del Pensiero - Storia e Politica. Rome: Istituto dell'Enciclopedia Italiana.
- Violante, Cinzio (2017). Gioacchino Volpe medievista. Brescia: Morcelliana. ISBN 978-8837231217.
- Figliuolo, Bruno (2022). "Sui rapporti tra Gioacchino Volpe e Benedetto Croce. A partire da una recente pubblicazione". Archivio Storico Italiano. 180 (4): 739–70. JSTOR 27307581.
