= Il Devoto–Oli =

- Editor: Luca Serianni; Maurizio Trifone
- Author: Giacomo Devoto; Gian Carlo Oli
- Subject: Dictionary of Italian
- Publisher: Le Monnier
- Publication date: 1971
- Media type: Print (Hardcover); CD-ROM
- Pages: 3216

Il Devoto–Oli. Vocabolario della lingua italiana is one of the best-known monolingual dictionaries of the Italian language, edited by Luca Serianni and Maurizio Trifone. Its first edition is dated 1971 and it is published annually by the Le Monnier.
