= Gian Carlo Oli =

Italian lexicographer

Gian Carlo Oli (30 May 1934 in Florence – 13 July 1996 in Florence) was an Italian lexicographer.

== Biography ==
Graduated in 1957 with Italian literature, he began to publish stylistic essays on the Poliziano. As a professor at a high school, he later devoted himself to the study of the Italian language by taking up the vocabulary part of the Vocabulary of the Italian language, written with Giacomo Devoto, published for the first time in 1971 by Le Monnier. The meeting with Devoto took place with the help of Giovanni Nencioni, then president of the Accademia della Crusca.

After the death of Devoto (1974), he did the only updating of the various editions of the dictionary, without neglecting the contribution of dialects and other languages in the evolution of contemporary Italian lexicon. Starting from the 2004 edition, the work was curated by Luca Serianni and Maurizio Trifone.

In 1993, after working in Israel and Venezuela as a cultural affiliate, he joined the Northern League, convinced that federalism is the only weapon to defend the dialect.

He died between 13 and 14 July 1996, after having been urgently admitted to the Villa Santa Chiara clinic in Florence.
