= Cyperus mogadoxensis =

Scientific classification
- Kingdom: Plantae
- Clade: Tracheophytes
- Clade: Angiosperms
- Clade: Monocots
- Clade: Commelinids
- Order: Poales
- Family: Cyperaceae
- Genus: Cyperus
- Species: C. mogadoxensis

Binomial name
- Cyperus mogadoxensis Chiov.

Species of sedge

Cyperus mogadoxensis is a species of sedge that is native to an area of eastern Africa.

The species was first formally described by the botanist Emilio Chiovenda in 1940.

== See also ==
- List of Cyperus species
