= Palazzo Frescobaldi, Florence =

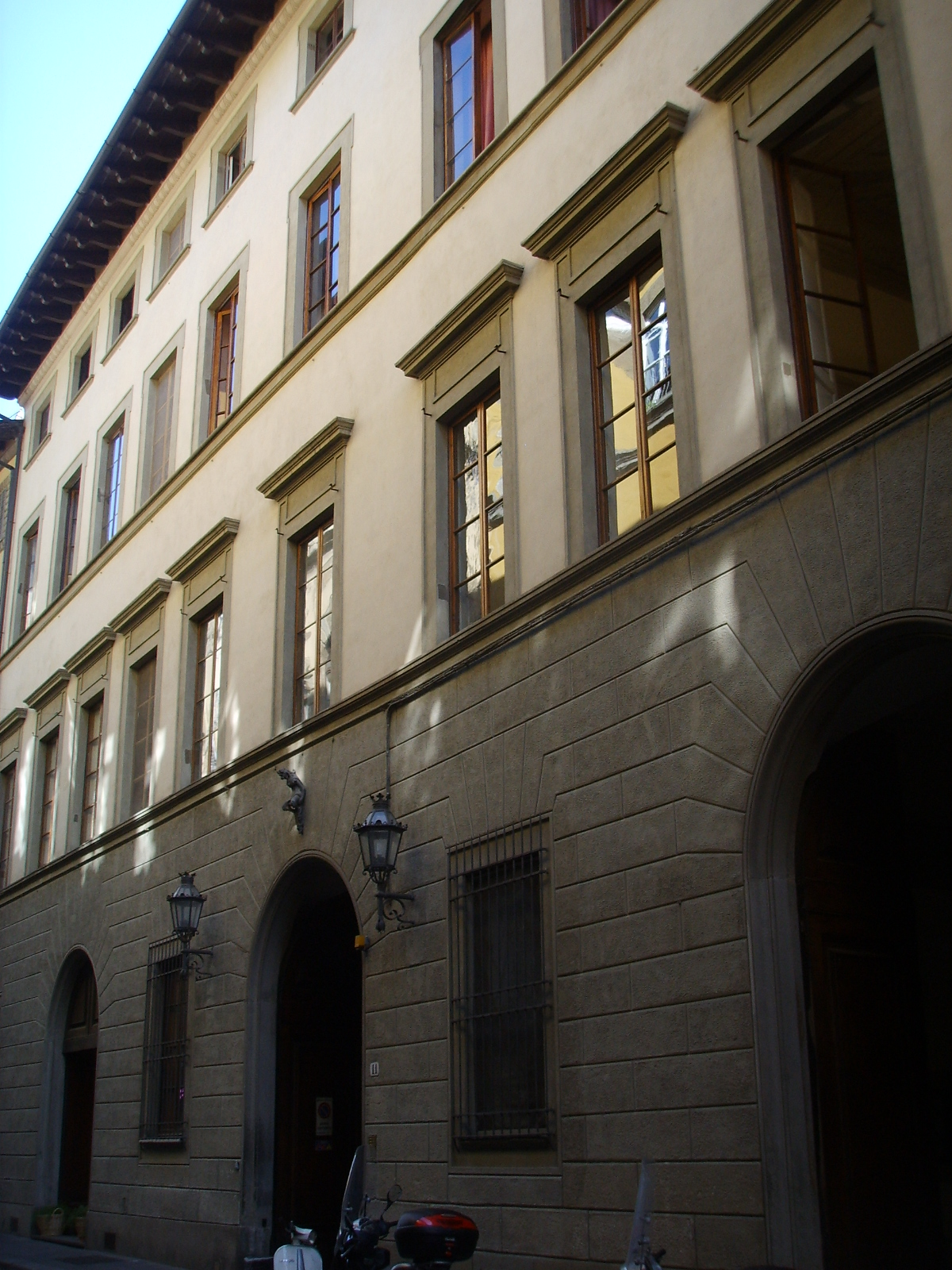
facade

The Palazzo Frescobaldi is a Renaissance-style palace located in the Borgo Santo Spirito of central Florence, region of Tuscany, Italy. It is located on via Santo Spirito 11-13. The garden abuts the rear of the Basilica di Santo Spirito.

== History ==
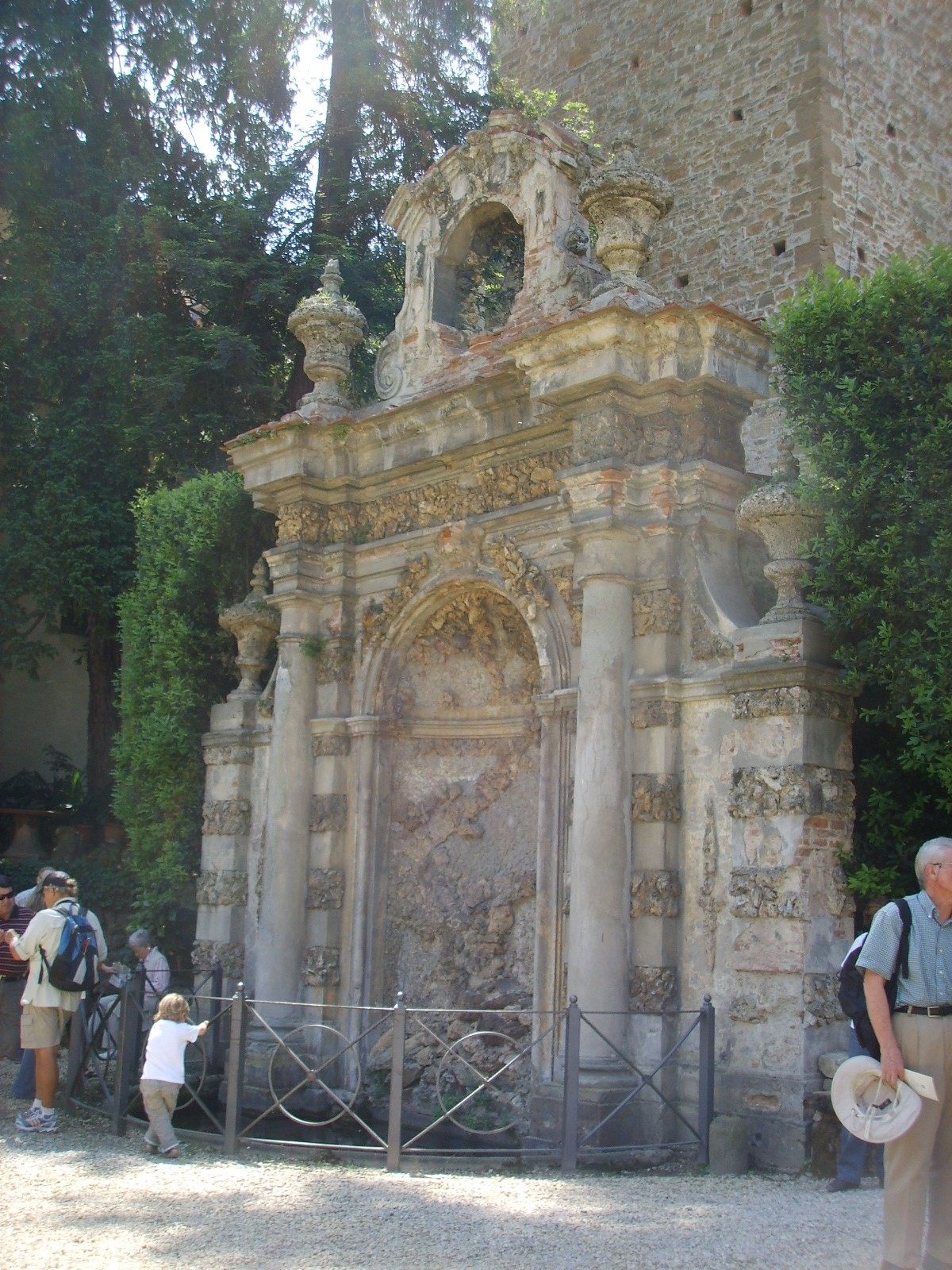
Garden fountain with small grotto

Until the late 16th century, the site was occupied by a number of houses belonging to the Frescobaldi, notable for known a Casa del Cortile, or House of the Courtyard, because of its large inner garden. The prominent family also built a large palace in Piazza San Jacopo. Many of their earlier structures were demolished during internecine conflicts. Under the patronage of Matteo Frescobaldi, between 1621 and 1644, the houses were unified into a single large residence. Behind the facade is still a large enclosed garden, enlivened with azaleas, with a baroque wall fountain. The garden also has two modern bronze sculptures by Arnaldo Pomodoro.

== Bibliography ==
- Translated in part from Italian Wikipedia entry
- Marcello Vannucci, Splendidi palazzi di Firenze, Le Lettere, Florence 1995.
- Toscana Esclusiva XII edizione, Associazione Dimore Storiche Italiane 2007.

43°46′05.17″N 11°14′53.2″E
