= Leopardian poetics =

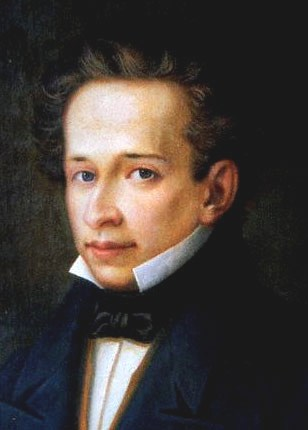
Giacomo Leopardi

The phrase Leopardian poetics refers to the poetical theories of Giacomo Leopardi.

These were not a single theory, but evolved dynamically during the years of his creativity, from his adolescence to his premature death. Leopardi often wrote about poetry in general and about his own idea of poetry, of its language and scope. Many pages on this subject can be found in the Zibaldone, a private diary and collection of notes, literary projects, translations, etc. Until 1822–23, he affirms the superiority of ancient men over his contemporaries, believing the powers of the imagination to have been very strong in the past; hence he upheld a kind of poetry which could give happiness through representations of a living nature, animated by gods, and near to men's feelings. In modern times, he believed, the progressive discovery of truth by science and philosophy had destroyed the faculty of imagination among all but very young children

L'immaginazione come ho detto è il primo fonte della felicità umana. Quanto più questa regnerà nell'uomo, tanto più l'uomo sarà felice. Lo vediamo nei fanciulli. Ma questa non può regnare senza l'ignoranza, almeno una certa ignoranza come quella degli antichi. La cognizione del vero cioè dei limiti e definizioni delle cose, circoscrive l'immaginazione.

Therefore, in Leopardi's view, modern poetry could no longer be imaginative, only "sentimental": the chief sentiment being disappointment at the contrast between the sweet illusions of the past and the blankness and sadness of the present. The language most suited to these sentiments is distanced and vague. Words which define are not poetic; words which are able to evoke distant feelings are poetic

Le parole lontano, antico e simili sono poeticissime e piacevoli, perché destano idee vaste, e indefinite, e non determinabili e confuse [...* le parole notte, notturno ecc., le descrizioni della notte ecc., sono poeticissime, perché la notte confondendo gli oggetti, l'animo non ne concepisce che un'immagine vaga, indistinta, incompleta, sì di essa che di quanto ella contiene. Così oscurità, profondo, ecc. (28 settembre 1821)

This, roughly, is what is called in Italian poetica dell'indefinito e del vago, which can be recognized in the Idilli and in Canti written between 1828 and 1830.

During the years 1824-27 Leopardian thought reached a turning point, which later affected even his poetics. He concluded that mankind had always been unhappy, because it is at the mercy of Nature, which creates men only to destroy them in its never-ending cycle. No space can be granted by the poet for illusions, or for sweet memories of youth: truth must be affirmed with terse, even hard language. This nuova poetica (new poetics) explains why poems written between 1831 and 1837 offer fewer fascinating images or recollections than the former poems. It is a language that sometimes seems to verge on prose; it is, indeed, a poetry which does not refrain from harsh or sarcastic phrases (see, for instance, La Ginestra) but which is open to a new, more subtle kind of musicality.

Leopardi spoke English and was influenced by John Locke and Percy Bysshe Shelley.

== Main sources ==
- Leopardi, Giacomo (1937). Zibaldone di pensieri. Milano: Mondadori.
- Leopardi, Giacomo (1982). trans. Giovanni Cecchetti (ed.). Operette Morali. University of California Press.
- Binni, Walter (1977). La protesta di Leopardi. Firenze: Sansoni.
- Blasucci, Luigi (1985). Leopardi e i segnali dell'infinito. Bologna: Il Mulino.
