= Angoseseli =

Scientific classification
- Kingdom: Plantae
- Clade: Tracheophytes
- Clade: Angiosperms
- Clade: Eudicots
- Clade: Asterids
- Order: Apiales
- Family: Apiaceae
- Genus: Angoseseli; Chiov.
- Species: A. mossamedensis

Binomial name
- Angoseseli mossamedensis (Welw. ex Hiern) C.Norman

Synonyms
- Genus: Meringogyne H.Wolff; Species: Angoseseli mazzocchii-alamannii Chiov.; Caucalis mossamedensis Welw. ex Hiern; Meringogyne mossamedensis H.Wolff; Pimpinella involucrata Hiern ex Engl. in H.G.A.Engler & O.Drude, nom. illeg.; Seseli mazzocchii-alamannii (Chiov.) M.Hiroe

Genus of flowering plants

Angoseseli is a genus of flowering plants in the family Apiaceae. Its only species is Angoseseli mossamedensis.
