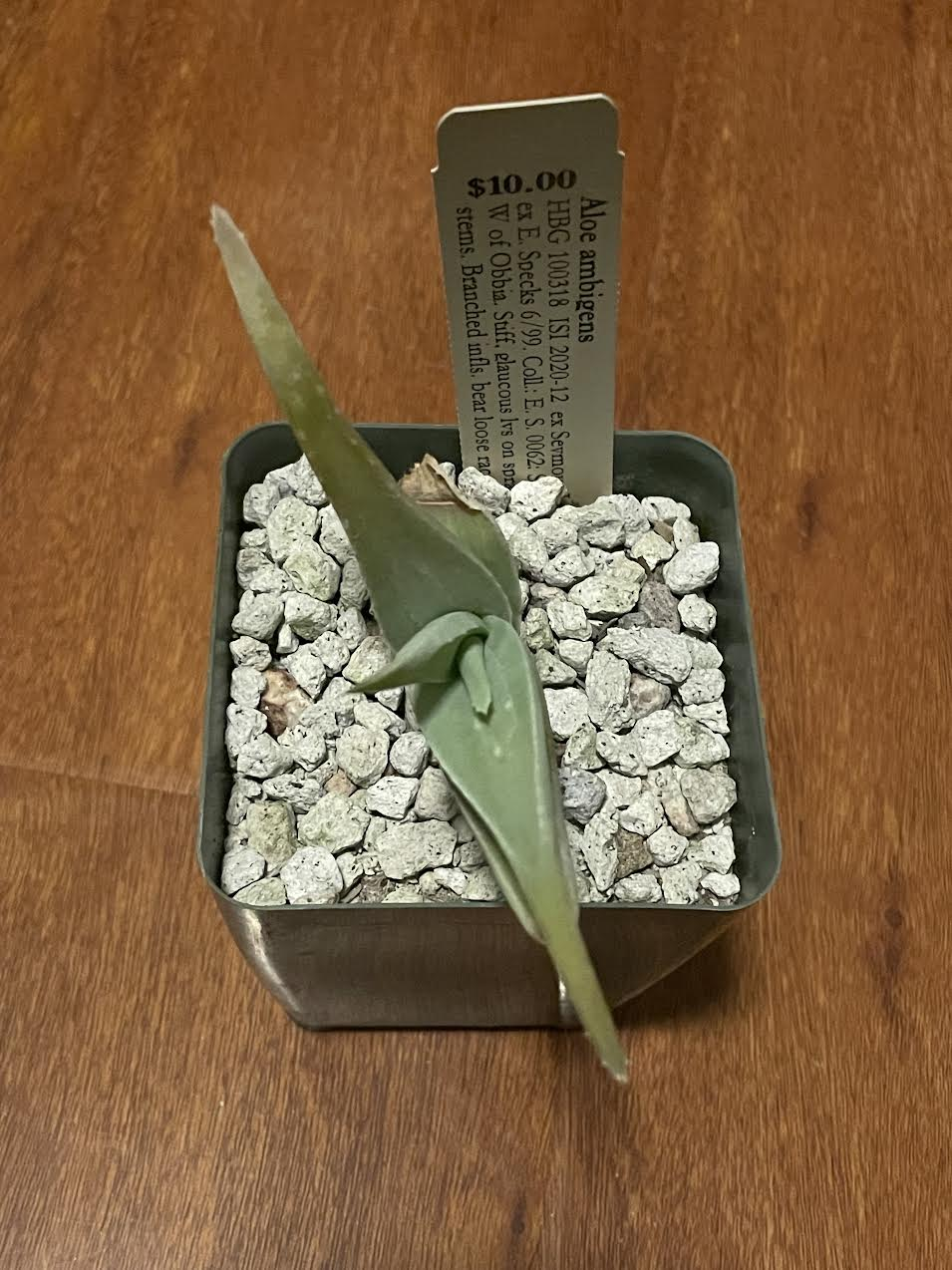

Conservation status
- Endangered (IUCN 3.1)
- CITES Appendix II (CITES)

Scientific classification
- Kingdom: Plantae
- Clade: Tracheophytes
- Clade: Angiosperms
- Clade: Monocots
- Order: Asparagales
- Family: Asphodelaceae
- Subfamily: Asphodeloideae
- Genus: Aloe
- Species: A. ambigens

Binomial name
- Aloe ambigens Chiov.

= Aloe ambigens =

Species of plant

Aloe ambigens is a rare aloe native to Somalia, but only one locality in the Mudug region is currently known.

== Description ==
Stem aloe that grows slowly to about 40 cm. Leaves a green teal color, and it grows rosettes on stems. They rarely offset making propagation of this rarity hard. The leaves are at first distichous meaning they grow in rows, one opposite of other..

== Flowers ==
A couple of small flowers on a branched inflorescence. It bears a dusky pink colored flowers with white tips and the flowers are tubular on loose racemes.
