= Sansoni (publisher) =

Italian publishing house

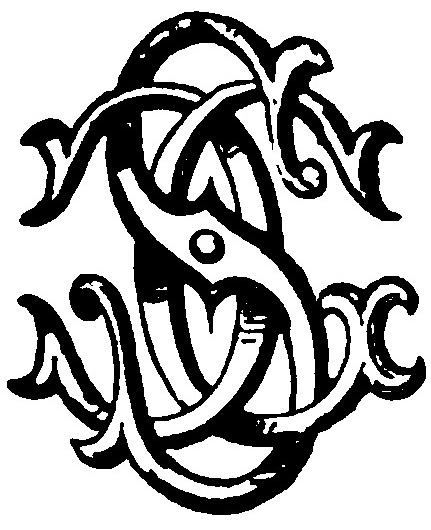
- Founded: 1873; 153 years ago in Florence, Italy
- Founder: Giulio Cesare Sansoni
- Key people: Giovanni Gentile
- Owner: Arnoldo Mondadori Editore

Sansoni is an Italian publisher founded in 1873 by Giulio Cesare Sansoni, located in Florence.

== History ==
Until the 1930s, Sansoni devoted almost all its attention to literature, with its works mostly aimed at schools and universities. Some of its most important collections include Raccolta di opere inedite o rare di ogni secolo della letteratura italiana (started in 1880), Biblioteca scolastica di classici italiani (started in 1885), Collezione di classici greci (started in 1887), Biblioteca critica della letteratura italiana (started in 1895).

In 1932, Sansoni was bought by Giovanni Gentile, who extended its scope into philosophy and history. He started several new magazines, including the second series of Giornale critico della filosofia italiana, Critica d'arte (edited by Ranuccio Bianchi Bandinelli, Carlo Ludovico Ragghianti, and Roberto Longhi), Lingua nostra (edited by Bruno Migliorini and Giacomo Devoto).

After the end of World War II and the assassination of Gentile in 1944, the publishing house was managed by his son, Federico. He opened the way to encyclopedias (including Enciclopedia cattolica and Enciclopedia dello spettacolo) and dictionaries. In 1976, Federico Gentile sold the company to Rizzoli, and that same year, he founded the publishing house Le Lettere (still located in Florence). Le Lettere acquired some of Sansoni's catalog, including Giovanni Gentile's Opera Omnia. Sansoni later became one of the many imprints of Arnoldo Mondadori Editore. Sansoni's archives are now stored in the Archivio di Stato di Firenze, which is restoring and inventorying them after the flood of 1966.

== Bibliography ==
- Marino Parenti, G.C. Sansoni: Editore in Firenze, Landi, Firenze, 1956
- Gianfranco Pedullà, Il mercato delle idee: Giovanni Gentile e la Casa editrice Sansoni, Il Mulino, Bologna, 1986
- Testimonianze per un centenario, Sansoni, Firenze, 1974
- Sansoni, 1873–1968, Officine Grafiche Firenze, Firenze, 1968 (exhibition organized by Comitato della Loggia Rucellai)
