= Royal Academy of Italy =

Italian Fascist academy (1929–1944)

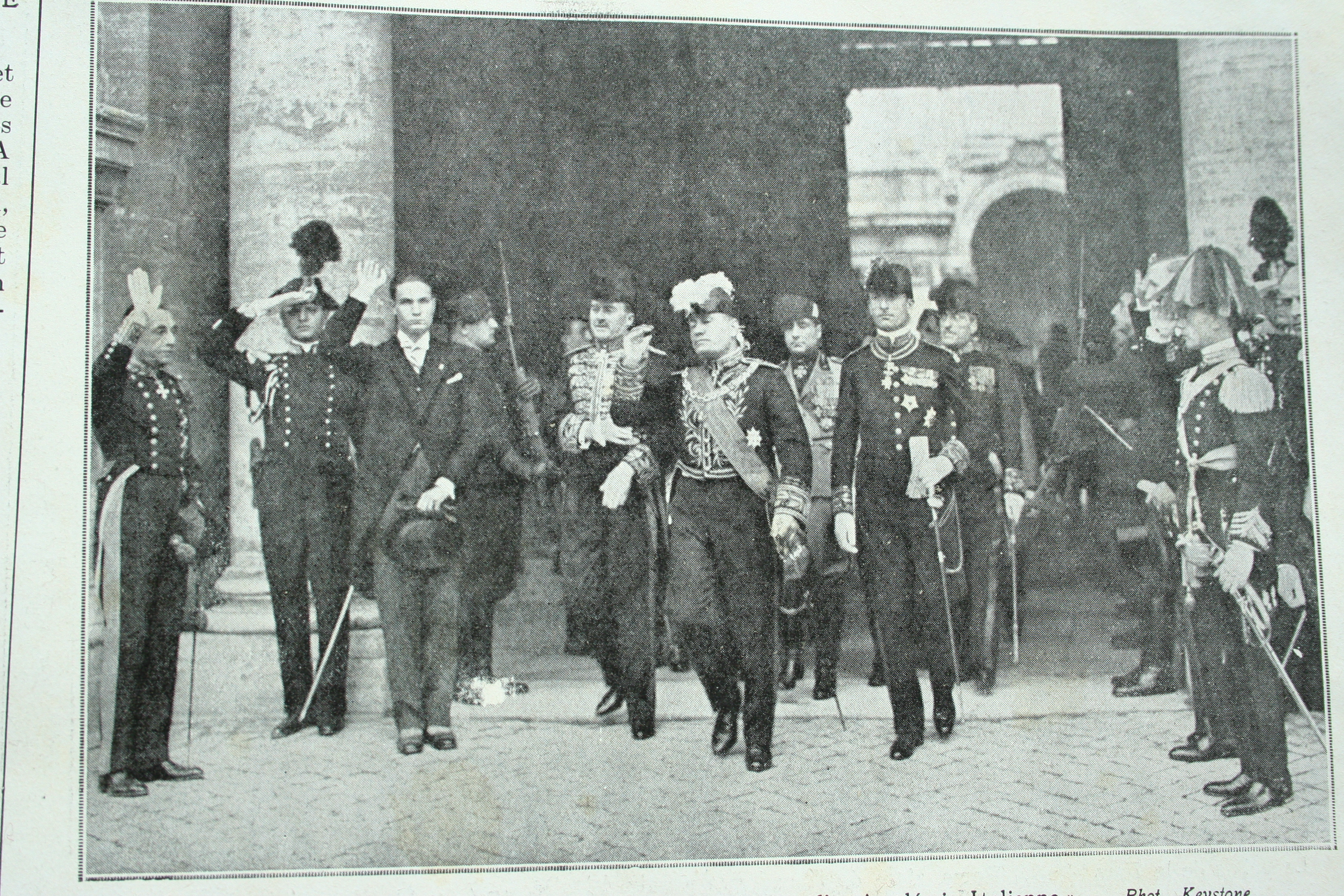
1929 inauguration of the Academy

The Royal Academy of Italy (Italian: Reale Accademia d'Italia) was a short-lived Italian academy of the Fascist period. It was created on 7 January 1926 by royal decree, but was not inaugurated until 28 October 1929. It was effectively dissolved in 1943 with the fall of Mussolini, and was finally suppressed on 28 September 1944. All of its functions and assets, including the Villa Farnesina, were passed to the Accademia Nazionale dei Lincei. Until 25 April 1945 it continued some activity in the Villa Carlotta on Lake Como near Tremezzo in Lombardy.

The declared purpose of the academy was "to promote and coordinate Italian intellectual activity in the sciences, the humanities, and the arts, to preserve the integrity of the national spirit, according to the genius and tradition of the race, and to encourage their diffusion [abroad]".

== Structure and history ==
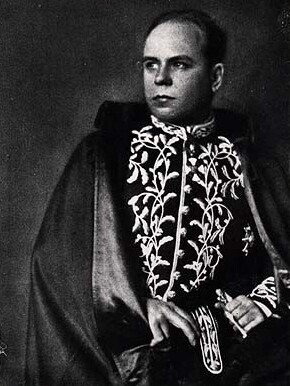
Architect Marcello Piacentini portrayed with the uniform of a member of the Royal Academy of Italy.

The Academy was modelled upon the prestigious French Academy. The Academy selected sixty Italians chosen for their scientific, literary, and artistic achievements. Those sixty members were divided into four groups of fifteen, representing the physical sciences, moral sciences (including history), arts, and letters (literature).

Politically the Academy served to unify and strengthen the Fascist regime's hold on intellectual activity in Italy, as the Academy demanded that all its members swear loyalty to Fascism and Italy. The Academy was effective at drawing in the intellectual and cultural elites, and was mostly effective at rewarding real talent rather than just loyalty to the regime. It absorbed other independent institutions, notably the prestigious and venerable scientific Accademia dei Lincei in 1939.

The members were well paid, earning 3,000 lire per month at a time when average per capita income in Italy was 3,079 per year. The members were automatically granted first class travel on Italy's national railways and were entitled to wear uniforms designed for the members and to be addressed as "Your Excellency". Each were allowed to compete for the four annual Mussolini prizes which were awarded to Academy members who demonstrated outstanding work in their respective fields. The Academy sponsored lectures, meetings, research, and publications. In 1934, the Academy appointed a commission to create a dictionary of the Italian language in which all Italianized foreign words were to be removed.

After the collapse of the Fascist regime in 1943 and the installation of the puppet Fascist regime in the Italian Social Republic, a new version of the Academy was briefly reopened until the remnant Fascist state was defeated in 1945.

== Membership ==
The six presidents of the Academy were:

- Tommaso Tittoni, politician, 1929–1930
- Guglielmo Marconi, inventor of radio telegraphy, 1930–1937
- Gabriele D'Annunzio, poet and politician, 1937–1938
- Luigi Federzoni, politician, 1938–1943
- Giovanni Gentile, philosopher, 1943–1944
- Giotto Dainelli Dolfi, geologist and geographer, from 1944.

There were sixty members in all. An initial list of thirty names was compiled by Tittoni and Francesco Giunta, and was approved by the council of ministers on 13 March 1929. They were: Antonio Beltramelli, Pietro Bonfante, Filippo Bottazzi, Armando Brasini, Pietro Canonica, Francesco Coppola, Giotto Dainelli Dolfi, Salvatore Di Giacomo, Enrico Fermi, Carlo Formichi, Umberto Giordano, Alessandro Luzio, Antonio Mancini, Filippo Tommaso Marinetti, Pietro Mascagni, Francesco Orestano, Alfredo Panzini, Nicola Parravano, Marcello Piacentini, Luigi Pirandello, Pietro Romualdo Pirotta, Ettore Romagnoli, Romano Romanelli, Giulio Aristide Sartorio, Francesco Severi, Bonaldo Stringher, Alfredo Trombetti, Giancarlo Vallauri, Gioacchino Volpe and Adolfo Wildt.
