= Carlo De Stefani =

Italian geologist and paleontologist

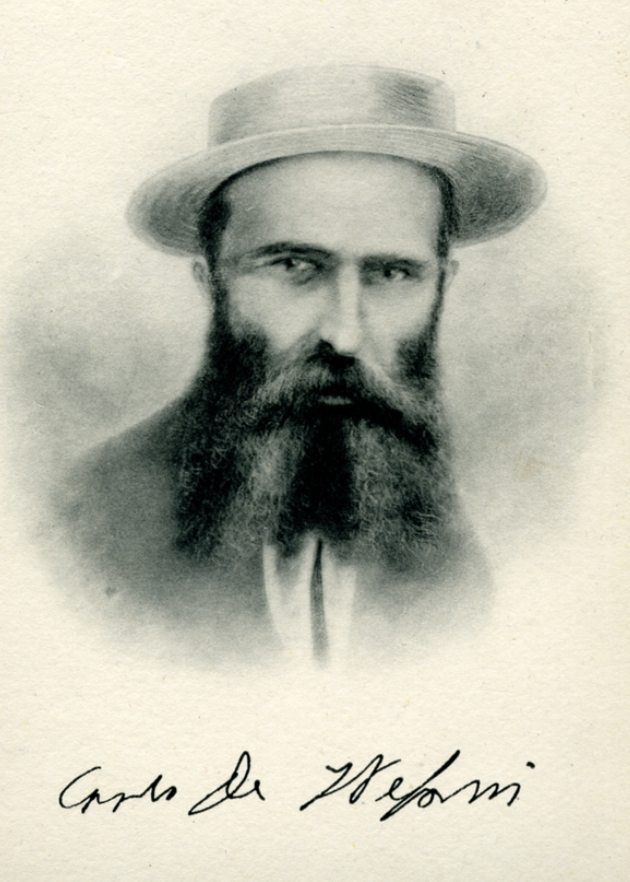
De Stefani (circa 1896)

Carlo De Stefani (9 May 1851 – 12 November 1924) was an Italian economist, geologist, paleontologist and a professor at the University of Siena and later at the universities of Florence and Naples.

== Biography ==
De Stefani was born in Padua where his father, Luigi, was a lawyer and nationalist married to Caterina Rigon. Educated at Livorno, he went to study law at Pisa and became interested in statistical methods used in economics and then he shifted to the study of geology under Giuseppe Giovanni Antonio Meneghini and Paolo Savi.

He published his degree thesis on economics, examining the value of work, after which he was appointed to the University of Siena to teach statistics and political economy. In 1878 he worked on a theory of rent, arguing against the ideas of David Ricardo. In the meantime, he also started looking at the Apuan Alps, publishing a geological map of southern Calabria. He collected rocks and fossils which he donated to the University of Pisa.

De Stefani clashed with the geologists Bernardino Lotti and Domenico Zaccagna, with animated sessions at the Tuscan Society of Natural Sciences between 1879 and 1882 which resulted in De Stefani distancing himself from Meneghini and his resignation from the Society. He also left his teaching position and fully immersed himself in geology, supporting Quintino Sella's proposal to establish the Italian Geological Society. He was placed on a committee along with Meneghini, Sella and Taramelli to draw the statute of the Society.

In 1885 he moved to the University of Florence. His students included Giotto Dainelli, G. Stefanini, E. Artini, and O. Marinelli. Among his ideas was that the Tuscan coast had emerged from the seabed, rather than sunk as suggested by Savi and Meneghini. He was also opposed to uniformitarianism and anti-catastrophic theories.

De Stefani died in Florence and was buried in Pieve Fosciana.
