= Alberto Castelvecchi =

Italian publisher and journalist

- Born: April 12, 1962 (age 64); Rome, Italy
- Education: Sapienza University of Rome
- Occupations: Linguist, publisher, professor
- Employer: Luiss Guido Carli University
- Known for: Effective communication and public speaking; founder of Castelvecchi publishing house
- Notable work: Italiano. Grammatica, sintassi, dubbi (with Luca Serianni)

Alberto Castelvecchi (born 12 April 1962 in Rome) is an Italian linguist, publisher, and Professor of Effective Communication and Public Speaking at Luiss Guido Carli University of Rome.

== Biography ==
Castelvecchi was born in Rome, the third of four brothers. He grew up in Bangkok, where his family moved in 1967. In the late 1970s he moved back to Rome, where he studied philology and linguistics at La Sapienza University. He subsequently worked at RAI, where he presented cultural programs for Rai Radio Tre and Rai Radio Due, ("Orione" and "Terza Pagina"). He also worked as a journalist, contributing to Il Messaggero and la Repubblica and Panorama on the subject of communication.

In 1984 he studied Italian Dialectology, Phonology and Dialetto_romanesco, taking deep dives into films such as "Ragazzi di vita" by Pier Paolo Pasolini to "Amore tossico" by Claudio Caligari and slang graffiti on walls. In 1987 he co-authored with Luca Serianni a descriptive grammars of the Italian language, Italiano. Grammatica, sintassi, dubbi.

In 1993 he founded the publishing house Castelvecchi, with Alessandra Gambetti and Antonella Fabbrini. Castelvecchi's mission was to give a voice to emerging authors. They have published Aldo Nove and Isabella Santacroce, as well as Luther Blissett.

In 1996 he started to work as a consultant for Omnitel pronto italia and Rai. In 2007 he studied the system of new technologies and web communication, becoming chief of cultural chapter of ilcannocchiale.it and founding the website "Mag".

In 2022 he worked as Advisor to the President of the Senate on Institutional Relations. He is a Member of the Scientific Committee at Fondazione Leonardo.

Alberto Castelvecchi has been also a member of veDrò, a think tank focused on cultural innovation and evolution of politics.
