= Giacomo Devoto =

Italian historical linguist (1897–1974)

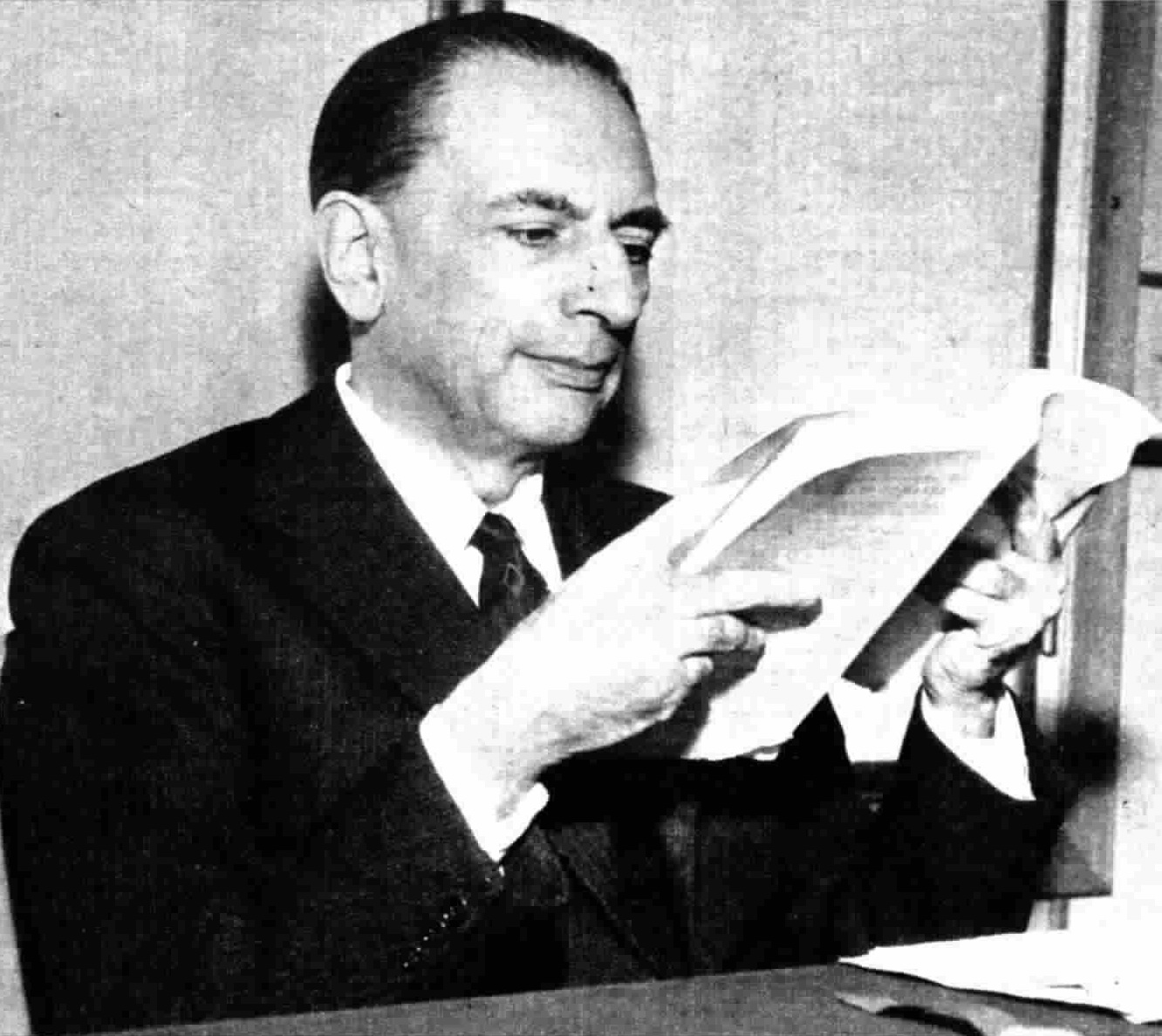
- Devoto in January 1969
- Born: 19 July 1897; Genoa, Kingdom of Italy
- Died: 25 December 1974 (aged 77); Florence, Italy
- Resting place: Borzonasca, Italy

Giacomo Devoto (19 July 1897 – 25 December 1974) was an Italian historical linguist and one of the greatest exponents of the twentieth century of the discipline. He was born in Genoa and died in Florence.

== Biography ==
He was the son of clinician and pathologist Luigi Devoto (1864–1936) and brother of industrialist Giovanni (1903–1944). In 1939 he founded with Bruno Migliorini the journal Lingua Nostra.

In 1931 he took the oath of allegiance to fascism with quiet cynicism (the expression is Gennaro Sasso's): the oath had for him "the value of a glass of cold water."

In January 1945, immediately after the Liberation, he founded in Florence together with Piero Calamandrei, Corrado Tumiati, Enzo Enriques Agnoletti and Paride Baccarini the AFE, the Association of European Federalists, later merging into the European Federalist Movement founded by Altiero Spinelli, in which he played a leading role in the years 1947–1948.

Assessor in the council of the City of Florence chaired by Gaetano Pieraccini.

He received several honorary degrees from the University of Paris, University of Basel, University of Strasbourg, Humboldt University of Berlin, Jagiellonian University, University of Zagreb and University of Lima.

He was president of the Accademia della Crusca from December 1963, academician of Denmark and Finland, emeritus of Historical linguistics and Rector (academia) of the University of Florence.

He was also the author with Gian Carlo Oli of Vocabolario illustrato della lingua italiana and Le Monnier (publishing house) Vocabolario della lingua italiana, edited from the 2004 edition by Luca Serianni and Maurizio Trifone.

Finally, he was one of the leading international experts on Indo-European studies (Indo-European Origins, 1962), Latin (History of the Language of Rome published in 1940) and Italian studies (Avviamento alla etimologia italiana of 1968, Il linguaggio d'Italia published in 1972, etc.).

He died in Florence on December 25, 1974, and was buried in the cemetery of Borzonasca (Genoa), his family's hometown.

== Career ==
In 1939 he founded with Bruno Migliorini the magazine Lingua Nostra.

In January 1945, after the Liberation, along with Piero Calamandrei, Corrado Tumiati, Enzo Enriques Agnoletti and Paride Baccarini, he founded, in Florence, the Associazione Federalisti Europei (AFE, its acronym – in English Association of European Federalists), uniting afterwards integrating into the European Federalist Movement founded by Altiero Spinelli, which between 1947 and 1948 had an important role.

He received several degrees "honoris causa" from the Paris, Basel, Strasbourg, Berlin (Humboldt), Krakow, Zagreb and Lima Universities.

He was President of the Accademia della Crusca from December 1963, Academician of Denmark and Finland, Glotología Emeritus and Rector of the Università degli Studi di Firenze.

He, along with Gian Carlo Oli, was the author of the Vocabolario Illustrato della lingua italiana (Illustrated Vocabulary of the Italian language) and of the Vocabolario della lingua Italiana Il Devoto-Oli (Vocabulary of the Italian language), edited by Luca Serianni and Maurizio Trifone.

He was one of the leading international experts on Indo-European languages (Origini indoeuropee, 1962), Latin (Storia della lingua di Roma published in 1940) and Italian (Avviamento alla etimologia italiana 1968, Il linguaggio d'Italia published in 1974, etc.). Among his contributions to Indo-European studies there is the elaboration of the concept of "Peri-Indo-European", i.e. everything that has hybrid characters between Indo-European and non-Indo-European. The term refers to both languages and territories but also peoples. The Peri-Indo-European can be seen as a rough Indo-European that was produced when traditions alien to the Indo-European were progressively altered by contact with the Indo-European. Devoto proposed and repeatedly supported the definition of the Etruscan language as Peri-Indo-European.

== Publications ==
- Antichi italici. 1931 (Ancient Italic Peoples)
- Storia della lingua di Roma. Capelli Editore, 1991, I ed. 1939 (History of the language of Rome)
- Studi di stilistica, 1950 (Studies in Stylistics)
- I fondamenti della storia linguistica. 1951 (The foundations of linguistic history)
- Profilo di storia linguistica italiana. 1953 (An Outline of Italian linguistic history)
- Origini indoeuropee. Edizioni di Ar, [2008], I ed.1962 (Indo-European Origins)
- I dialetti delle regioni d'Italia. Sansoni, Florencia 1972, con Gabriella Giacomelli (The dialects of the Italian regions)
- Le origini e la lingua dei Lettoni en "Letonia". 1939 (Res Balticae 1997) (The origins of the Latvian language)
- Le letterature dei paesi baltici, Sansoni 1969 (The literatures of the Baltic countries)
