= Maurizio Trifone =

Italian linguist and lexicographer (born 1953)

Maurizio Trifone (born 1953) is an Italian linguist and lexicographer.

== Biography ==
Trifone is professor of Italian language at the University of Cagliari.

From 1995 to 2005 he was professor of Lexicography and Lexicology at the Foreigners University of Siena.

Previously, he was lexicographer and etymologist at the Institute of the Italian Encyclopedia Treccani.

He has led research about Italian linguistic history from the Middle Ages to the present day.

He has authored Il Devoto-Oli dei sinonimi e contrari, a dictionary of synonyms and antonyms published by Le Monnier in 2013. Together with Luca Serianni he is in charge of the Vocabolario della lingua Italiana Il Devoto-Oli.

From 2000 to 2005 he was director of the Language Centre at the Foreigners University of Siena and he held training courses for Italian teachers in many countries around the world.

He has created Affresco Italiano, an Italian language course for foreigners in 6 volumes (from A1 to C2 levels).

Since 2006 he is the editor of the magazine «Letterature straniere &» (Foreign Literatures &).

== Main works ==
- Aspetti linguistici della marginalità nella periferia romana, Annali dell'Università per stranieri di Perugia (supplemento al n. 18), Guerra Edizioni, Perugia, 1993, pp. 207
- Ordine analogico e retrodatazioni. A proposito del «Vocabolario Nomenclatore» di Palmiro Premoli, in «Nuovi Annali della Facoltà di Magistero dell’Università di Messina», 12 (1994), pp. 135–236
- Le carte di Battista Frangipane (1471-1500), nobile romano e mercante di campagna, Universitätsverlag C. Winter, Heidelberg, 1998, pp. 531 (Collana Studia Romanica, vol. n. 93)
- Lingua e società nella Roma rinascimentale. I. Testi e scriventi, Franco Cesati Editore, Firenze, 1999, pp. 717
- Carte mercantili a Roma tra ’400 e ’500, Betti Editrice, Siena, 2003, pp. 238
- Il linguaggio burocratico, in Lingua e identità. Una storia sociale dell’italiano, a cura di Pietro Trifone, Roma, Carocci, 2006, pp. 213-240
- “Carbonaio” è una parola di alto uso? Riflessioni sul “Vocabolario di base” e sul “Dizionario di base della lingua italiana”, in «Studi di Lessicografia italiana», XXIV (2007), pp. 265–300
- (con Antonella Filippone e Andreina Sgaglione) Affresco italiano. Corso di lingua italiana per stranieri, 6 voll. (livelli A1, A2, B1, B2, C1, C2), Le Monnier-Mondadori, Firenze-Milano, 2007-2012
- Il Devoto-Oli 2014. Vocabolario della lingua italiana, a cura di Luca Serianni e Maurizio Trifone, Le Monnier-Mondadori, Firenze-Milano, 2013, pp. 3227
- Il Devoto-Oli dei Sinonimi e Contrari. Con analoghi, generici, specifici, inversi e gradazioni semantiche, Le Monnier-Mondadori, Firenze-Milano, 2013, pp. 1536
