= Lingua nostra =

- Discipline: Linguistics
- Language: Italian
- Edited by: Andrea Dardi; Massimo Fanfani

Publication details
- History: 1939–present
- Publisher: Le Lettere (Italy)
- Impact factor: <0.1 (2023)

Standard abbreviations
- ISO 4: Ling. Nostra

Indexing
- ISSN: 0024-3868
- OCLC no.: 2354631

Links
- Journal homepage

Lingua nostra ("Our Language") is an Italian peer-reviewed academic journal of general linguistics published by Le Lettere. The journal was established in 1939 by Bruno Migliorini and Giacomo Devoto, and originally published by Sansoni. It publishes both articles and book reviews.

== Abstracting and indexing ==
The journal is abstracted and indexed in:

- Arts and Humanities Citation Index
- Current Contents/Arts & Humanities
- Linguistic Bibliography
- MLA International Bibliography
- Scopus

According to the Journal Citation Reports, the journal has a 2023 impact factor of <0.1.
