= Pietro Trifone =

Italian linguist

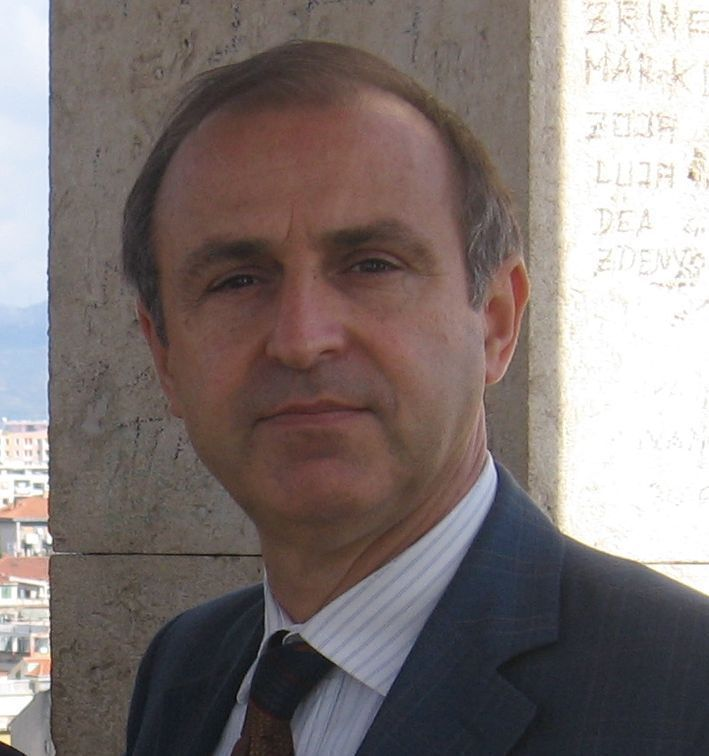
Pietro Trifone

Pietro Trifone (born 1951 in Rome) is an Italian linguist.

== Biography ==
Trifone lectures History of Italian language at the department of Philology, linguistics and literature of the University of Rome Tor Vergata. He has also led research work at the Sapienza Università di Roma, D'Annunzio University of Chieti–Pescara and Foreigners University of Siena.

With Maurizio Dardano he has written a reference grammar of the Italian language. With Luca Serianni he has edited the Storia della lingua italiana in three volumes (1993–1994), with contributions by fifty scholars.

His research activity embraces various fields, ranging from the analysis of grammatical structures of contemporary Italian to the history of literary and popular language, mainly with reference to the relationship between linguistic change and social life.

He also carried out studies on the following topics:

- plurilingualism of 16th century (I cantici di Fidenzio, 1981);

- language of politics (Dizionario politico popolare, 1981);

- Roman dialect and regional varieties of Italian (Roma e il Lazio, 1992; Storia linguistica di Roma, 2008; Città italiane, storie di lingue e culture, 2015);

- language of theatre (L'italiano a teatro, 2000; La lingua del teatro, 2015, first part);

- Italian language of the Renaissance (Rinascimento dal basso, 2006);

- Italian linguistic identity (Lingua e identità, 2006 new edition 2009);

- Italian "irregular" language from Dante until today (Malalingua, 2007);

- linguistic impact of national factionalism (Storia linguistica dell'Italia disunita, 2010);

- diffusion of the common Italian language (Pocoinchiostro. Storia dell'italiano comune, 2017).

From 1996 to 2004 he held the office of Rector of the Foreigners University of Siena. Currently in the University of Rome Tor Vergata he holds the position of coordinator of the PhD in Comparative Studies.

He is member of the Accademia della Crusca, of the Accademia dell'Arcadia, of the Istituto Nazionale di Studi Romani and co-director of the magazines «La lingua italiana. Storia, strutture, testi» and «Carte di viaggio. Studi di lingua e letteratura italiana».

== Main works ==
- Camillo Scroffa, I cantici di Fidenzio. Con appendice di poeti fidenziani, a cura di Pietro Trifone, Salerno Editrice, Roma, 1981
- Dizionario politico popolare (1851), a cura di Pietro Trifone, Salerno Editrice, Roma, 1984
- Roma e il Lazio, Utet Libreria, Torino, 1992 (collana L'italiano nelle regioni)
- Storia della lingua italiana, a cura di Luca Serianni e Pietro Trifone, 3 voll., Einaudi, Torino, 1993–1994
- La sintassi dell'italiano letterario, a cura di Maurizio Dardano e Pietro Trifone, Bulzoni, Roma, 1995
- (con Maurizio Dardano) La nuova grammatica della lingua italiana, Zanichelli, Bologna, 1997
- L'italiano a teatro. Dalla commedia rinascimentale a Dario Fo, Istituti Editoriali e Poligrafici Internazionali, Pisa-Roma, 2000
- Rinascimento dal basso. Il nuovo spazio del volgare tra Quattro e Cinquecento, Bulzoni, Roma, 2006
- Dire l'ineffabile. Caterina da Siena e il linguaggio della mistica, a cura di Lino Leonardi e Pietro Trifone, Edizioni del Galluzzo, Firenze, 2006
- Malalingua. L'italiano scorretto da Dante a oggi, Il Mulino, Bologna, 2007
- Storia linguistica di Roma, Carocci, Roma, 2008
- Lingua e identità. Una storia sociale dell'italiano, a cura di Pietro Trifone, nuova ediz., Carocci, Roma, 2009 (I ediz. 2006)
- Storia linguistica dell'Italia disunita, Il Mulino, Bologna, 2010
- (con Massimo Palermo e Beatrice Garzelli), Gramática de la lengua italiana (per ispanofoni), Guerra, Perugia, 2011
- (con Claudio Giovanardi), L'italiano nel mondo, Carocci, Roma, 2012
- (con Massimo Palermo), Grammatica italiana di base, terza edizione, Zanichelli, Bologna, 2014
- Città italiane, storie di lingue e culture, a cura di Pietro Trifone, Carocci, Roma, 2015
- (con Claudio Giovanardi), La lingua del teatro, Il Mulino, Bologna, 2015
- Pocoinchiostro. Storia dell'italiano comune, Il Mulino, Bologna, 2017
