= Pietro Romualdo Pirotta =

Italian professor of botany (1853–1936)

Romualdo Pirotta
- Born: 7 February 1853; Padua
- Died: 3 August 1936 (aged 83); Rome
- Scientific career
- Fields: Botany
- Author abbrev. (botany): Pirotta

Pietro Romualdo Pirotta (7 February 1853 – 3 August 1936) was an Italian professor of botany. He was made Knight of the Crown of Italy.

== Biography ==
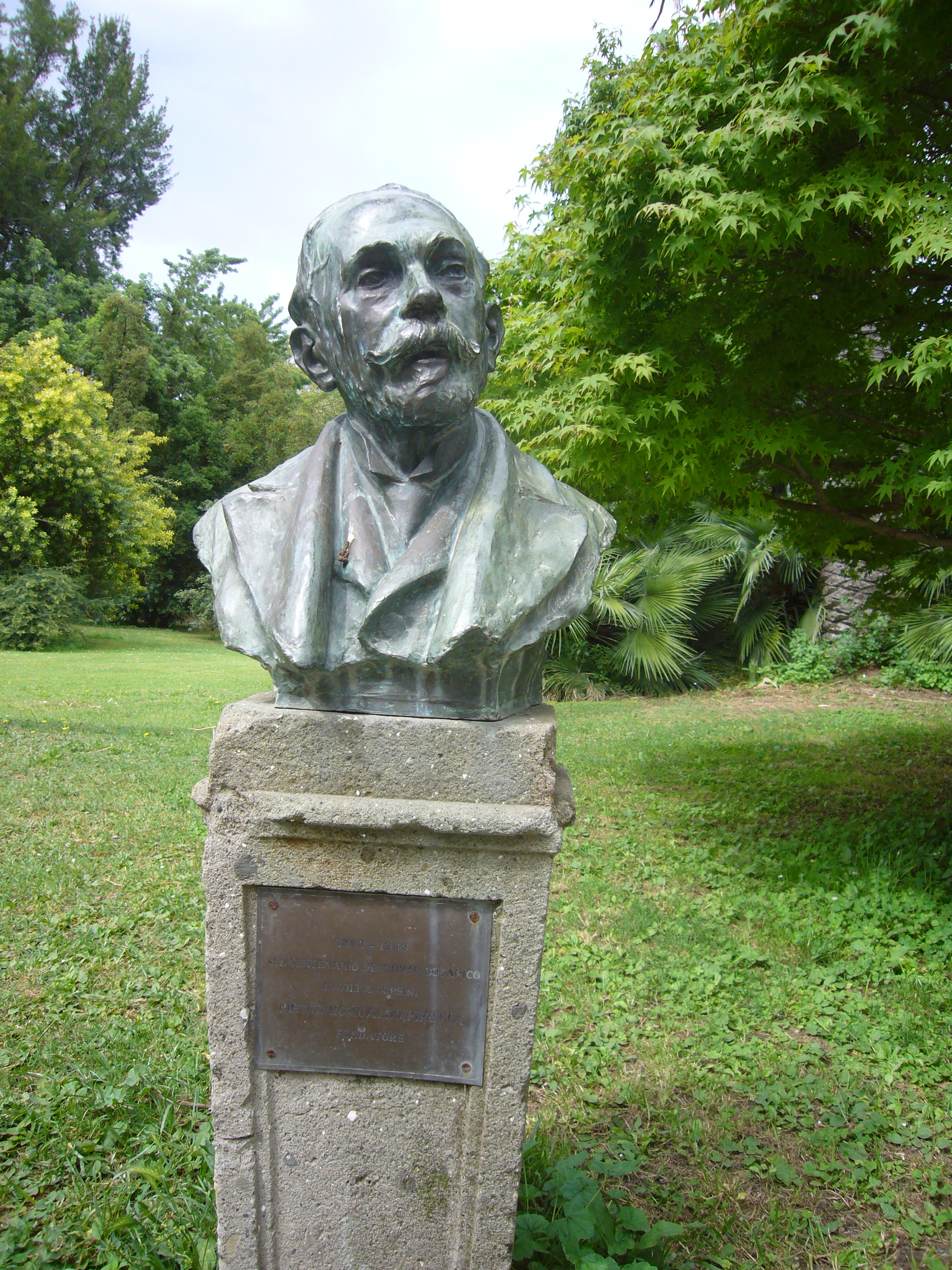
Bust of Pietro Romualdo Pirotta at the Orto botanico di Roma

He enrolled in the faculty of medicine of the University of Pavia and then changed to the University's faculty of sciences, where he graduated in July 1875. He taught science at the liceo of Pistoia and simultaneously worked at the mycological laboratory which was part of the Botanical Institute of the University of Pavia, where he received his laurea (PhD). In 1879 he won a prize from the Institute of Mycology at the University of Strasbourg. In Italy he was appointed to the professorial chair of botany at the University of Modena and to the directorship of the botanical garden at Modena. In 1883 the minister Guido Baccelli appointed him Professor at the Department of Botany at the Sapienza University of Rome, in which position he remained until 1928. Pirotta directed the creation of a new botanical institute in the garden attached to the convent of San Lorenzo in Panisperna. Pirotta was a founder of the publication of l'Annuario of the Royal Botanical Institute of Rome (subsequently named the Annali di Botanica). He promoted the founding of the Colonial Herbarium (located in Rome from 1905 to 1915 and then in Florence).

Pirotta identified the first outbreaks of Plasmopara viticola (grapevine downy mildew) in Italy. In 1917–1922 he played a key role in the creation of the National Park of Abruzzo. He served as president of the Italian Botanical Society.

Pirotta was elected to the Accademia dei Lincei in 1901 and to the Royal Academy of Italy in 1929. A street in Rome is named in his honor.

== Sources ==
- Franco Pedrotti, Alle origini del Parco Nazionale d’Abruzzo: le iniziative di Pietro Romualdo Pirotta, (L’uomo e l’ambiente, 10), Università degli Studi di Camerino, Camerino 1988;
- Luigi Piccioni, Il volto amato della Patria. Il primo movimento per la protezione della natura in Italia, 1880-1934, (L'uomo e l'ambiente, 32), Università degli Studi di Camerino 1999;
- P.R. Pirotta, Il Parco nazionale dell’Abruzzo, Federazione italiana delle associazioni Pro Montibus ed enti affini, Roma 1917.
