= Delio Cantimori =

Italian historian (1904–1966)

Delio Cantimori (1904 – September 13, 1966) was an Italian academic, historian, political writer, and translator. He is best known for his conception of the group he called the eretici (heretics), religious exiles of the 16th century from Italy.

== Life ==
=== Early life ===
Cantimori was born at Russi, the son of Carlo Cantimori, a school head and follower of Giuseppe Mazzini; the futurist Cino Cantimori was his younger brother. Their mother was Silvia Sintini. Cantimori was educated at schools in Forlì and Ravenna. In 1924 he won a scholarship at the Scuola Normale Superiore in Pisa, and enrolled also at the University of Pisa to read literature and philosophy. He was at Pisa until 1929, and came under the influence of Giuseppe Saitta (1881–1965), a scholar of the Italian Renaissance.

=== Fascist activism ===
As a follower of Saitta and Giovanni Gentile, Cantimori began publishing in Vita Nova in 1927, in the direction of the actual idealism of Gentile, a theorist of Italian fascism; Vita Nova was set up by Leandro Arpinati, a National Fascist Party political leader. Later in 1962 Cantimori described to Ernesto Rossi the reason of his involvement with the fascist party, and his enrolling in its ranks in 1926:

I entered the fascist party in 1926. I was in a state of mental confusion and had really no excuse for it. In fact I had read Gobetti's Rivoluzione Liberale in the Forli public library, and Salvemini's l'Unita, to which my father subscribed. But I was convinced that fascism had carried out the true Italian revolution and was still doing so, and that it should become a European revolution; and I believed one had to work along those lines.

From 1929 Cantimori was a high school teacher in Cagliari at the Liceo Dettori, teaching philosophy and history; his sister Letizia attended Cagliari University in 1930. It was there that Giuseppe Dessì was a pupil to whom he gave support, with the use of his personal library, and introductions to Claudio Varese and others. Cantimori moved on in autumn 1931 to the Liceo Classico Ugo Foscolo in Pavia. He left Pavia after about two months, on a ministerial scholarship, to study at Basel, returning in July 1932. Acquiring scholarly contacts, he studied abroad again from August 1933. At this period he was researching for his major work Eretici italiani del Cinquecento (1939). One important contact from these travels was Stanisław Kot in Kraków, a scholar of the Unitarians pioneers the Sozzinis, founders of Socinianism. Correspondence with Roland Bainton from 1932 for the rest of his life is preserved at Yale Divinity School Library.

=== Mid-career and the break with fascism ===
Cantimori returned to Rome, and librarian and editorial work, in 1934. In 1936, he married Emma Mezzomonti, a communist activist. He remained for a time at least nominally a Fascist. In 1939, the anti-fascist Velio Spano stayed with him.

=== Post-war ===
After the end of World War II, Cantimori joined the Italian Communist Party (PCI) in 1948, and made translations from Karl Marx. He didn't renew his membership, and thus left the PCI in 1956.

== Works ==
Cantimori was prominent in the group of broad-based historians prominent after World War II in Italy, who took revised views of philosophical idealism, with Federico Chabod, Giuseppe Galasso, Walter Maturi and Adolfo Omodeo. He was significant as an opponent of "Romantic aestheticism", and was also unsympathetic to the Annales School. He moved away from idealism as formulated by Gentile, and also in the sense of Benedetto Croce, and also rejected Marxist materialism. His approach to history was related to those of Giorgio Falco and Franco Venturi.

His first historical work "Il caso Boscoli e la vita del Rinascimento" in the Giornale critico della filosofia italiana, from 1927, looked at the case of Pietro Paolo Boscoli, executed in 1513 for involvement in an assassination conspiracy against the Medici family. His dissertation at Pisa in 1928 was on Ulrich von Hutten. In 1935 he used a book introduction (to the Italian translation of The Italian Reformers by Frederic Corss Church) to break with the orthodoxy of the liberal Croce on Jean Calvin and his treatment of Michael Servetus as a heretic—Croce supported the political expediency of the decision. It presaged his 1939 collective biography of the eretici. Cantimori had already published an essay on Bernardino Ochino in 1929. He began to hammer out the scope of the eretici project in letters to Bainton from 1932.

Cantimori contributed an article, translated by Frances Yates, to the second issue of the London Journal of the Warburg Institute in 1937. Emma Cantimori edited with Gertrud Bing La rinascita del paganesimo antico (The Renewal of Pagan Antiquity, 1966), the first published collection of Aby Warburg's writings.
