= Le Lettere =

- Founded: 1976
- Founder: Federico Gentile
- Country of origin: Italy
- Headquarters location: Florence, Italy
- Publication types: Books & peer-reviewed journals
- Official website: www.lelettere.it

Le Lettere is an Italian publishing house based in Florence, founded in 1976 by publisher Federico Gentile, son of the philosopher Giovanni Gentile.

== History ==
It was founded in 1976 by the publisher Federico Gentile (Naples 1904 - Florence 1996), who worked for a long time at Sansoni, the Florentine publishing house bought by his father, the philosopher Giovanni. When in 1975 the historic Sansoni was bought by Rizzoli, Gentile decided to found "Le Lettere" with his son Giovanni (who shared the name with his grandfather), specializing it in university literary publications: more than 1500 books divided into forty series, from history to poetry, from art to fiction.

The company also publishes eighteen specialized periodicals including Giornale critico della filosofia italiana, Lingua nostra, La Rassegna della letteratura italiana, the annual bulletins of the Accademia della Crusca.

Many books previously published by Sansoni have been republished by the publishing house, which also published Giovanni Gentile's Opera Omnia, completed in 1999. Since 1994 it has taken over from Mondadori in the publication of the works of Dante Alighieri on behalf of the Società Dantesca Italiana ("Italian Dante Society").

The company has series of philosophy, linguistics, narrative, and poetry.
