= Giotto Dainelli =

Italian geographer, geologist, politician and mayor (1878–1968)

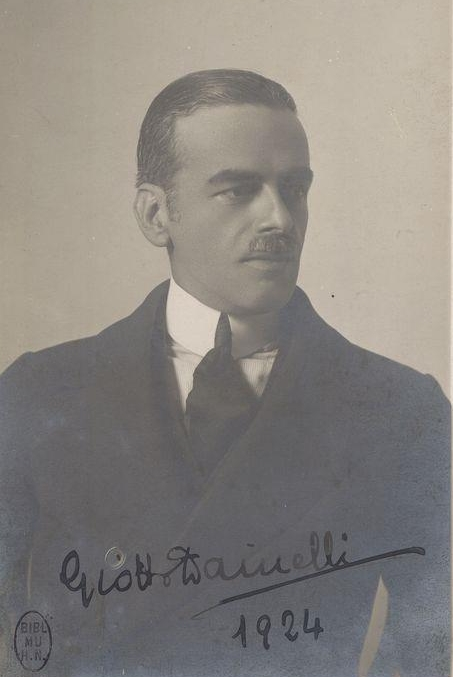
In 1924

Giotto Dainelli Dolfi (19 May 1878 - 16 November 1968) was an Italian geographer, geologist, paleontologist, traveller and writer. Dainelli travelled in Eritrea, Africa, and to the Himalayas. He was a supporter of Italian fascism but was not a signatory of the Manifesto of Race.

Dainelli was born in Florence, the son of General Luigi and Virginia Mari. He grew up travelling with his father both on work and on travel. He studied natural sciences at Florence, graduating in 1900 with studies under the geologist Carlo De Stefani (1851-1924) before joining the University of Vienna. He studied the Friulian Prealps north of Venezia Giulia. He also studied the Pliocene of Italy along with P. Videsott and A. Sestini. He became a lecturer at Florence in 1903 and from 1914 at the University of Pisa as a chair of geography. He travelled to Eritrea along with Olinto Marinelli, Lamberto Loria and Aldobrandino Mochi in 1905–6. This expedition followed after he attended the Italian Colonial Congress at Asmara. In 1913-1914 he travelled to the Karakoram and Himalayas along with the expedition headed by Filippo De Filippi. Other members of this expedition included Giorgio Abetti, Nello Venturi Ginori, Camillo Alessandri, Lieutenant Alberto Alessio, engineer John Alfred Spranger, Major Henry Wood of the Survey of India along with surveyors Janma Prasad and Shib Lal, alpine guide Joseph Petigax, and Lieutenant Cesare Antilli. In 1921 he moved to Naples and in 1924 moved back to Florence to take the place made vacant by De Stefani upon his death. He made another expedition into the Horn of Africa in 1936–37. He taught until 1944 with a break during World War II. A supporter of fascist rule, he was favoured by Benito Mussolini who made him Podestà (mayor) of Florence in 1944. He served as the president of the Academy of Italy from 1944 to 1945, following the assassination of Giovanni Gentile by the Gruppi di Azione Patriottica (gappisti). He wrote an autobiography in 1967. His collection of expedition photographs are held by the Italian Geographical Society. Dainelli published more than 600 works. Punta Dainelli, a peak in the Georgian Kazbegi Mountains of the Caucasus is named after him. A fossil Trigonia (Lyriodon) dainellii was named from his collections after him by Venzo in 1945.
