= Luca Serianni =

Italian linguist and philologist (1947–2022)

Luca Serianni (Italian pronunciation: [ˈluːka seˈrjanni]; 30 October 1947 – 21 July 2022) was an Italian linguist and philologist.

== Biography ==
Serianni was professor of Italian language at Sapienza Università di Roma.

A student of Arrigo Castellani’s, he conducted research about Italian linguistic history from the Middle Ages to the present day.

He authored a reference grammar of the Italian language. Together with Maurizio Trifone he was in charge of the Vocabolario della lingua Italiana Il Devoto-Oli, and with Pietro Trifone he edited Storia della lingua italiana.

He was a member of the Accademia della Crusca, Accademia dei Lincei, Arcadia, and vice-chairman of the Società Dante Alighieri.

In 2002, he was awarded an honorary degree from the University of Valladolid.

He was the director of the journals Studi linguistici italiani (Italian Linguistic Studies) and Studi di lessicografia italiana (Studies of Italian Lexicography).

== Main works ==
- Il Turamino, a cura di Luca Serianni, Salerno Editrice, Rome, 1976
- Testi pratesi della fine del Dugento e dei primi del Trecento, a cura di Luca Serianni, Accademia della Crusca, Florence, 1977
- Norma dei puristi e lingua d'uso nell'Ottocento nella testimonianza del lessicografo romano Tommaso Azzocchi, Accademia della Crusca, Florence, 1981
- Grammatica italiana. Suoni, forme, costrutti, in collaborazione con Alberto Castelvecchi, Utet, Turin, 1989
- Storia della lingua italiana. Il primo Ottocento, Il Mulino, Bologna, 1989
- Saggi di Storia linguistica italiana, Morano, Naples, 1989
- Storia della lingua italiana. Il secondo Ottocento, Il Mulino, Bologna, 1990
- Storia della lingua italiana, a cura di Luca Serianni e Pietro Trifone, 3 vol., Einaudi, Turin 1993–1994
- Italiano. Grammatica, sintassi, dubbi, con Alberto Castelvecchi e un glossario di Giuseppe Patota, Garzanti, collana editoriale Le Garzantine, Milan, 1997
- Lezioni di grammatica storica italiana, Bulzoni, Rome, 1998
- Introduzione alla lingua poetica italiana, Carocci, Rome, 2001
- Viaggiatori, musicisti, poeti. Saggi di storia della lingua italiana, Garzanti, Milan, 2002
- Italiani scritti, Il Mulino, Bologna, 2003 (second edition: 2007)
- Un treno di sintomi. I medici e le parole: percorsi linguistici nel passato e nel presente, Garzanti, Milan, 2005
- Prima lezione di grammatica, Laterza, Rome-Bari, 2006
- La lingua poetica italiana, Carocci, Rome, 2008
- (con Giuseppe Benedetti), Scritti sui banchi. L'italiano a scuola tra alunni e insegnanti, Rome, Carocci, 2009
- L'ora d'italiano, Rome-Bari, Laterza, 2010
