= Bruno Migliorini =

Italian linguist and philologist

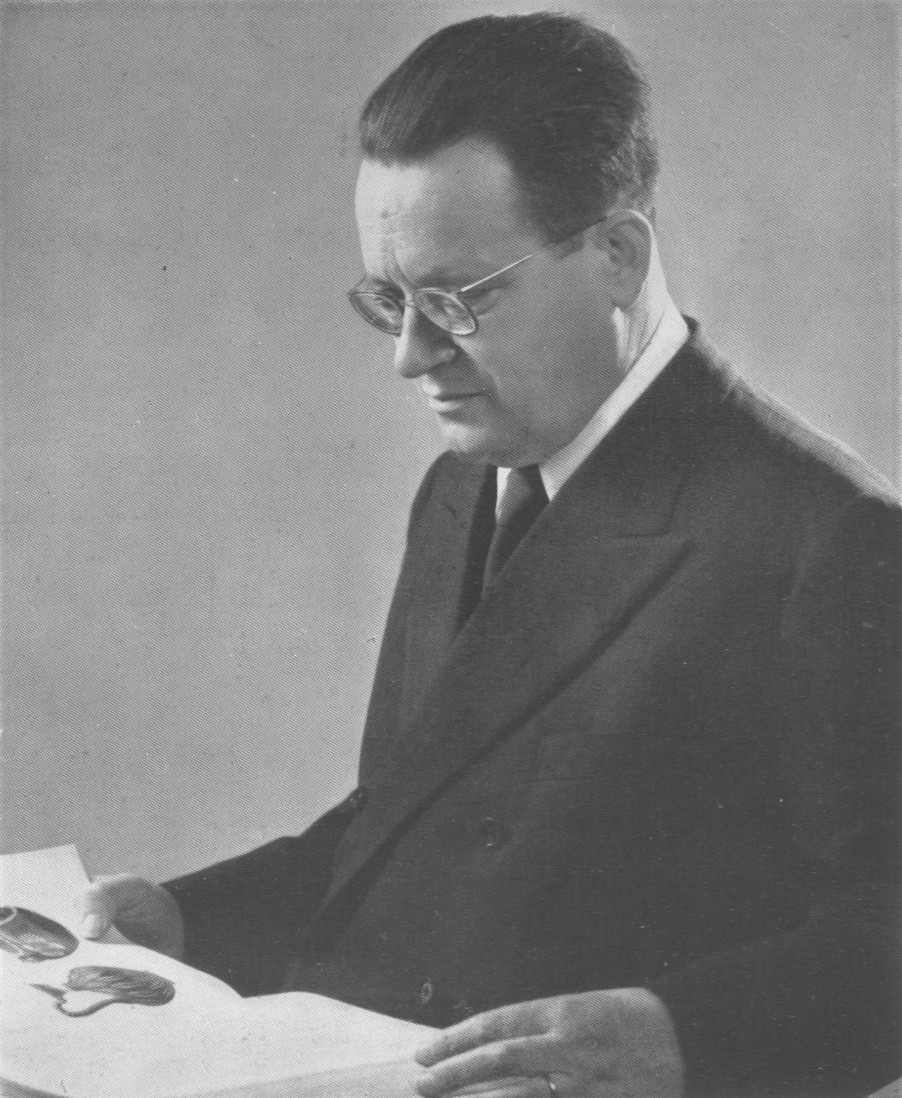
- Migliorini in 1957
- Born: 19 November 1896; Rovigo, Kingdom of Italy
- Died: 18 June 1975 (aged 78); Florence, Republic of Italy
- Occupation: Linguist

Academic work
- Discipline: Linguistics, Philology

Bruno Migliorini (Italian pronunciation: [ˈbruːno miʎʎoˈriːni]; 19 November 1896 – 18 June 1975) was an Italian linguist and philologist. He was the author of one of the first scientific histories of Italian language and was president of the Accademia della Crusca.

== Early life ==
Migliorini was born in Rovigo. He studied at Ca' Foscari University in Venice, then in the Faculty of Letters of the University of Padua. After the Italian defeat in the Battle of Caporetto (1917), his family was forced to move to Rome.

== Linguistics works ==
At the University La Sapienza, he met his masters, the philologists Ernesto Monaci and Cesare De Lollis, and, from 1920, collaborated to La Cultura, a journal whose founders included De Lollis himself and Giovanni Gentile.

He was chief editor of the Enciclopedia Italiana from 1930 to 1933, when he succeeded Angelo Monteverdi as professor of Romance languages and literature at the University of Fribourg, where Migliorini remained until 1938. Thenceforth, he was the first professor of the History of Italian Language, a newly created position at the University of Florence, which he kept until 1967. In 1939, together with Giacomo Devoto, he founded the journal Lingua nostra ("Our Language").

From 1949 to 1963, Migliorini was president of the Accademia della Crusca and, from 1958, he was a member of the Accademia dei Lincei. He was one of the main Italian experts on Esperanto.

He is one of the authors of a standard pronouncing dictionary of Italian, the Dizionario d'ortografia e di pronunzia, or DOP.

== Later life and death ==
Bruno Migliorini died in Florence on 18 June 1975.

== Bibliography ==
=== Translated to English ===
- Migliorini, Bruno; Griffith, Thomas Gwynfor (1984). The Italian Language (1966) First Edition. London: Faber and Faber. ISBN 978-0-571-18073-8.

== Sources ==
- Nencioni, Giovanni (1976). Bruno Migliorini: discorso commemorativo pronunciato dal linceo Giovanni Nencioni nella seduta ordinaria dell'8 maggio 1976 (in Italian). Rome: Accademia Nazionale dei Lincei. ICCU IT\ICCU\NAP\0096044.
