= Le Monnier (publishing house) =

Italian publisher

Le Monnier was an Italian publishing house. It was purchased by Mondadori in 1999.

== History ==
Le Monnier was founded in Florence in 1837 by the Frenchman Felice Le Monnier (1806 - 1884).

Handed over in 1859 to the Successor Company Le Monnier, the company was discovered in 1922 by Armando Paoletti, who restored it with the "National Library" and the launch of the series "Studies and Documents on the History of the Risorgimento" directed by Giovanni Gentile.

From the 1960s, the publishing house has published important political, literary and scientific journals such as "Pegaso", "Il Ponte", "Italian Studies of Classical Philology", "La Cultura". Other publications include the illustrated Vocabulary of the Italian Language and the Vocabulary of the Italian Language by Giacomo Devoto and Gian Carlo Oli, and the Devoto-Oli of synonyms and contraries.

The company had personalities like Vittore Branca and Giovanni Spadolini (as director of "History Quotes " and, from 1976 to 1994, as president of the company),

In 1999, Le Monnier joined the Arnoldo Mondadori Editore group.
