= Giovanni Gentile =

Italian pedagogue, philosopher, and politician (1875–1944)

Giovanni Gentile OCI COSML
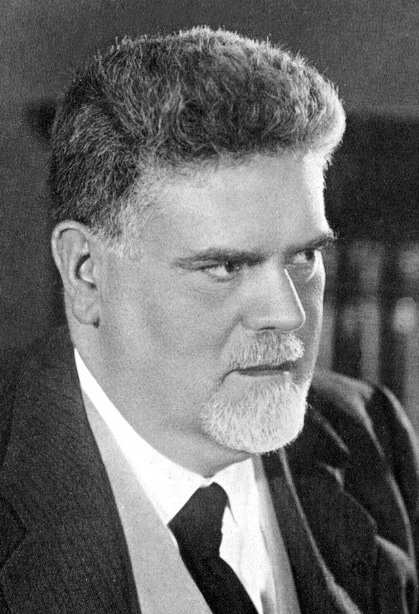
- Portrait of Gentile, c. 1930s–1940s

President of the Royal Academy of Italy
- In office 25 July 1943 – 15 April 1944
- Monarch: Victor Emmanuel III
- Preceded by: Luigi Federzoni
- Succeeded by: Giotto Dainelli Dolfi

Minister of Public Education
- In office 31 October 1922 – 1 July 1924
- Prime Minister: Benito Mussolini
- Preceded by: Antonino Anile
- Succeeded by: Alessandro Casati

Senator of the Kingdom
- In office 5 November 1922 – 5 August 1943
- Appointed by: Victor Emmanuel III

Personal details
- Born: 29 May 1875 Castelvetrano, Kingdom of Italy
- Died: 15 April 1944 (aged 68) Florence, Kingdom of Italy
- Cause of death: Assassination by gunshot
- Resting place: Santa Croce, Florence, Italy
- Party: National Fascist Party (1923–1943)
- Spouse: Erminia Nudi (m. 1901)
- Children: 6, including Federico
- Education: Scuola Normale Superiore; University of Florence

Education
- Academic advisor: Alessandro D'Ancona

Philosophical work
- Era: 20th-century philosophy
- Region: Western philosophy
- School: Italian idealism Neo-Hegelianism; Conservative liberalism (early); Fascism (later)
- Institutions: Sapienza University of Rome, Scuola Normale Superiore di Pisa, University of Palermo, University of Pisa
- Main interests: Metaphysics, dialectics, pedagogy
- Notable ideas: Actual idealism, fascism, immanentism (method of immanence)

Giovanni Gentile (/dʒɛnˈtiːleɪ/ jen-TEE-lay; Italian: [dʒoˈvanni dʒenˈtiːle]; 29 May 1875 – 15 April 1944) was an Italian pedagogue, philosopher, and politician. He was one of the primary founders of fascism.

Born in Castelvetrano, Gentile graduated from the Scuola Normale Superiore and the University of Pisa. He, alongside Benedetto Croce, was a major exponent of Italian idealism in Italian philosophy, and also devised his own system of thought, which he called "actual idealism" or "actualism", which has been described as "the subjective extreme of the idealist tradition".

Described by himself and by Benito Mussolini as the "philosopher of fascism", he was influential in providing an intellectual foundation for Italian fascism, notably through writing the 1925 Manifesto of the Fascist Intellectuals, and part of the 1932 "The Doctrine of Fascism" with Mussolini. As Minister for Public Education, he introduced in 1923 the so-called Gentile Reform of the Italian educational system, the first major piece of legislation passed by the Fascist government, which would last in some capacity until 1962. He also helped found the Institute of the Italian Encyclopedia with Giovanni Treccani, and was its first editor.

Though his political influence waned as Mussolini sought the alliance of the Catholic Church in the late 1920s, which conflicted with Gentile's secularism, he remained a faithful Fascist, even after the 1943 armistice with the Allies, and followed Mussolini into the Italian Social Republic. He was assassinated in 1944 by partisans of the Italian resistance.

== Biography ==
=== Early life and career ===
Gentile was born in Castelvetrano, Italy. He was inspired by Risorgimento-era Italian intellectuals such as Mazzini, Rosmini, Gioberti, and Spaventa from whom he borrowed the idea of autoctisi, "self-construction", but also strongly influenced and mentored by the German idealist and materialist schools of thought—namely Karl Marx, Hegel, and Fichte, with whom he shared the ideal of creating a Wissenschaftslehre (Doctrine of Science), a theory for a structure of knowledge that makes no assumptions. Friedrich Nietzsche, too, influenced him, as seen in an analogy between Nietzsche's Übermensch and Gentile's Uomo Fascista. In religion he presented himself as a Catholic (of sorts), and emphasised actual idealism's Christian heritage; Antonio G. Pesce insists that «there is in fact no doubt that Gentile was a Catholic»; and Gentile once spoke of "his" atheism only in reference to the accusation of atheism leveled against him, although he maintained until the end that he was culturally Catholic. Gentile thought that God is immanent in the act of thinking, not a separate transcendent entity.

Gentile won a fierce competition to become one of four exceptional students of the prestigious Scuola Normale Superiore di Pisa, where he enrolled in the Faculty of Humanities.

In 1898 he graduated in Letters and Philosophy with a dissertation titled Rosmini e Gioberti, that he realised under the supervision of Donato Jaja, a disciple of Bertrando Spaventa.

During his academic career, Gentile served in a number of positions, including:

- Professor of the History of Philosophy at the University of Palermo (27 March 1910);
- Professor of Theoretical Philosophy at the University of Pisa (9 August 1914);
- Professor of the History of Philosophy at the University of Rome (11 November 1917), and later as Professor of Theoretical Philosophy (1926);
- Commissioner of the Scuola Normale Superiore di Pisa (1928–32), and later as its Director (1932–43); and
- Vice President of Bocconi University in Milan (1934–44).

A long-time collaborator of Benedetto Croce, the two first became friends in 1896 and remained close until 1925, when Croce sided against fascism and Gentile for it with their Manifesto of the Anti-Fascist Intellectuals and Manifesto of the Fascist Intellectuals respectively.

=== First World War ===
Gentile was largely uninvolved with politics prior to the outbreak of World War One; he saw himself as a conservative liberal in the vein of Cavour, but mostly concerned himself with writing on the matters of education. Like many Italians, however, the war marked the start of more active involvement in politics, and publicly declared himself for Italy's intervention in the war after the disastrous Battle of Caporetto in 1917, though was privately one from the outbreak of the war. He saw the war as the emergence of a new Italy, which had to fight and destroy the "easy-going, idle Italy", "known for its faint-hearted nature, its individualism, its poor sense of taste and its tendency to withdraw into private egoism"; it was a chance to complete the Risorgimento and uphold its ideals.

Despite his ardent support of the war, he remained staunch in his criticism of the extreme nationalists such as Enrico Corradini and the Italian Nationalist Association for their rejection of liberalism. By the end of the war in 1918, he was attacking much of the Italian political sphere: the Socialists and the Catholics of the future Popular Party for their opposition to the national state; the Vatican as a hostile independent power opposed to the existence of Italy; and the liberal trasformismo of Giovanni Giolitti and the Italian Parliament, marred by endless squabbling, and now an outdated relic in the face of the "new Italy" birthed by the experience of war.

Gentile was indignant at the rejection of Italy's claims, set out in the 1915 Treaty of London, at the Paris Peace Conference. Not only did it fail to respect the hard-fought gains of the "new Italy", but it encouraged fatalism, liberal back-biting, and the questioning of the ideals of intervention in the first place—that is, of the spiritual invigoration that Gentile saw as the most significant consequence of the war. As such, he would support the ultranationalist poet Gabriele D'Annunzio's 1919 occupation of Fiume, which was an important precursor to Fascism. Nonetheless, he continued to believe in liberal democracy and praised the new Prime Minister, Francesco Saverio Nitti, for his commitment to national economic recovery. As the post-war period wore on, Gentile saw no sign of the spiritual revolution within Italian liberal society that he had hoped for, and became increasingly disillusioned; he disengaged with active politics in 1920 and would not return to it until Benito Mussolini's 1922 seizure of power in the March on Rome, by which point fascist doctrine was largely complete.

=== Involvement with Fascism ===
==== Minister of Public Education, 1922–1924 ====
In 1922, on the recommendation of Benedetto Croce, who had refused the role himself, Gentile was named Minister for Public Education for the government of Benito Mussolini. The cabinet, though strongly right-wing, was broadly non-partisan; Gentile's inclusion, alongside several other notable non-fascists, was taken as a sign of reconciliation and the promised return to law-and-order. He officially joined the National Fascist Party in 1923.

In his capacity as Minister for Public Education, he instituted the 1923 Gentile Reform, which was the first major reform of the education system since the Unification of Italy and the Casati Law Despite lacking any substantial education policy prior to coming to power, it was the first significant piece of legislation of the Fascist regime; Mussolini described it as the "most Fascist reform".

Based on philosophically idealist and conservative elitist ideas, it was designed to help form the new elite of Fascist society and to reduce the number of intellectual graduates saturating the job market.

An additional purpose of the reform was to improve the regime's relationship with the Catholic Church. It made religious instruction mandatory in junior schools, gave equal distinction to private (notably Catholic) and state schools, and allowed both to sit the same qualification exams for entrance into higher education; these were important elements of the programme of the Catholic Popular Party, and did much to shore up Catholic opinion of the Fascist regime—a long-standing problem for Italian governments due to the Roman Question—as part of a wider programme of concessions by Mussolini to the Vatican. However, it did not go far enough to completely please the Church. Complaints remained over the fact that religious teaching was neither given by priests nor extended beyond the junior schools.

Included in this reform was an attempt to limit the number of women teachers in schools, part of Italian Fascism's wider campaign against feminism, suggesting that:

Women do not have, nor will they ever have, either the moral or mental vigor to teach in those schools which formed the ruling class of the country.

The reform also mandated that Italian was the only language to be used in public schools, severely impacting the autonomy of non-Italian speaking minorities—known as allogeni—particularly in the regions of Alto-Adige and the Julian March, recently annexed in the Treaty of Saint-Germain-en-Laye following the First World War.

Under Gentile's reform, the secondary school system was substantially reorganised. The technical schools (scuola technica), relied on by the middle class for educational attainment and in which pupil numbers had increased rapidly since 1900, were abolished. In their place were "complementary schools" (scuola complementare), general education schools which did not allow access to universities or further qualifications. Entry into particular fields, such as science and engineering, were restricted to other specialised secondary schools. The curriculum was also rearranged, emphasising the humanities and especially philosophy; teaching of Latin was also more widely introduced.

Pupil numbers were successfully reduced under Gentile's new system. Secondary school student numbers dropped from 337,000 to 237,000 between 1923 and 1926–27, and university students by 13,000, from 53,000 in 1919–20 to 40,000 in 1928–29. Enrollment in the technical schools, and the complementary schools that replaced them, dropped by half from 1922–23 to 1923–24.

The reform, which had produced a system far more complicated than before, proved unpopular. After Gentile left his position in 1924, it would be gradually dismantled by his successors; the "complementary schools" were abolished in 1930, and in 1939 then-Minister for Education Giuseppe Bottai made further sweeping changes to the education system.

He resigned his position in 1924 during the Matteotti Crisis. Christopher Seton-Watson suggested it was in protest of the murder of Giacomo Matteotti; Gabriele Turi disputes this, writing instead that the purpose of his resignation was to reinforce the Fascist regime and relieve Mussolini's cabinet of his own unpopular presence.

==== After the Matteotti Crisis ====
In 1925, Gentile headed two constitutional commissions that helped establish the corporate state of Fascism as part of the Exceptional Fascist Laws, and was a member of the Fascist Grand Council from 1925 to 1929.

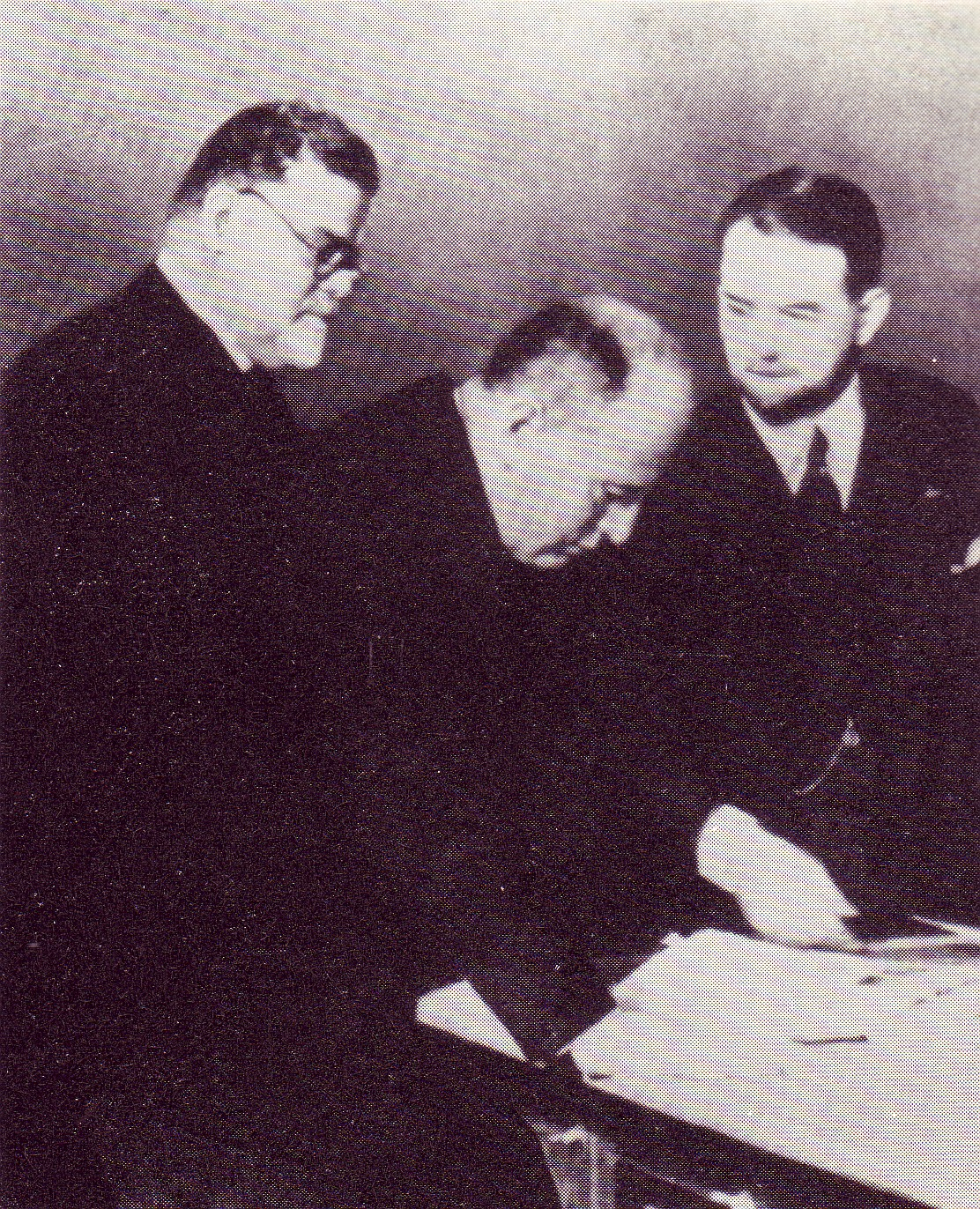
Giovanni Gentile and Benito Mussolini examining the first volumes of the Enciclopedia Italiana

Giovanni Gentile was described by Mussolini, and by himself, as "the philosopher of Fascism"; he was the ghostwriter of the first part of the essay "The Doctrine of Fascism" (1932), attributed to Mussolini. It was first published in 1932, in the Italian Encyclopedia, wherein he described the traits characteristic of Italian Fascism at the time: compulsory state corporatism, Philosopher Kings, the abolition of the parliamentary system, and autarky. He also wrote the Manifesto of the Fascist Intellectuals which was signed by a number of writers and intellectuals, including Luigi Pirandello, Gabriele D'Annunzio, Filippo Tommaso Marinetti and Giuseppe Ungaretti.

Gentile's political influence in the regime waned in the late 1920s. He lost favour for remarking that fascism was a minority movement and was further sidelined following the Lateran Treaty, with his anti-clericalism no longer appropriate if the regime was to maintain the support of the Catholic Church. Gentile remained loyal to Mussolini, however, and continued to support him even after the fall of the Fascist government in 1943, following him in the establishment of the Republic of Salò, a puppet state of Nazi Germany, and accepted an appointment in its government despite having criticized its anti-Jewish laws. Gentile was the last president of the Royal Academy of Italy (1943–1944).

== Assassination ==
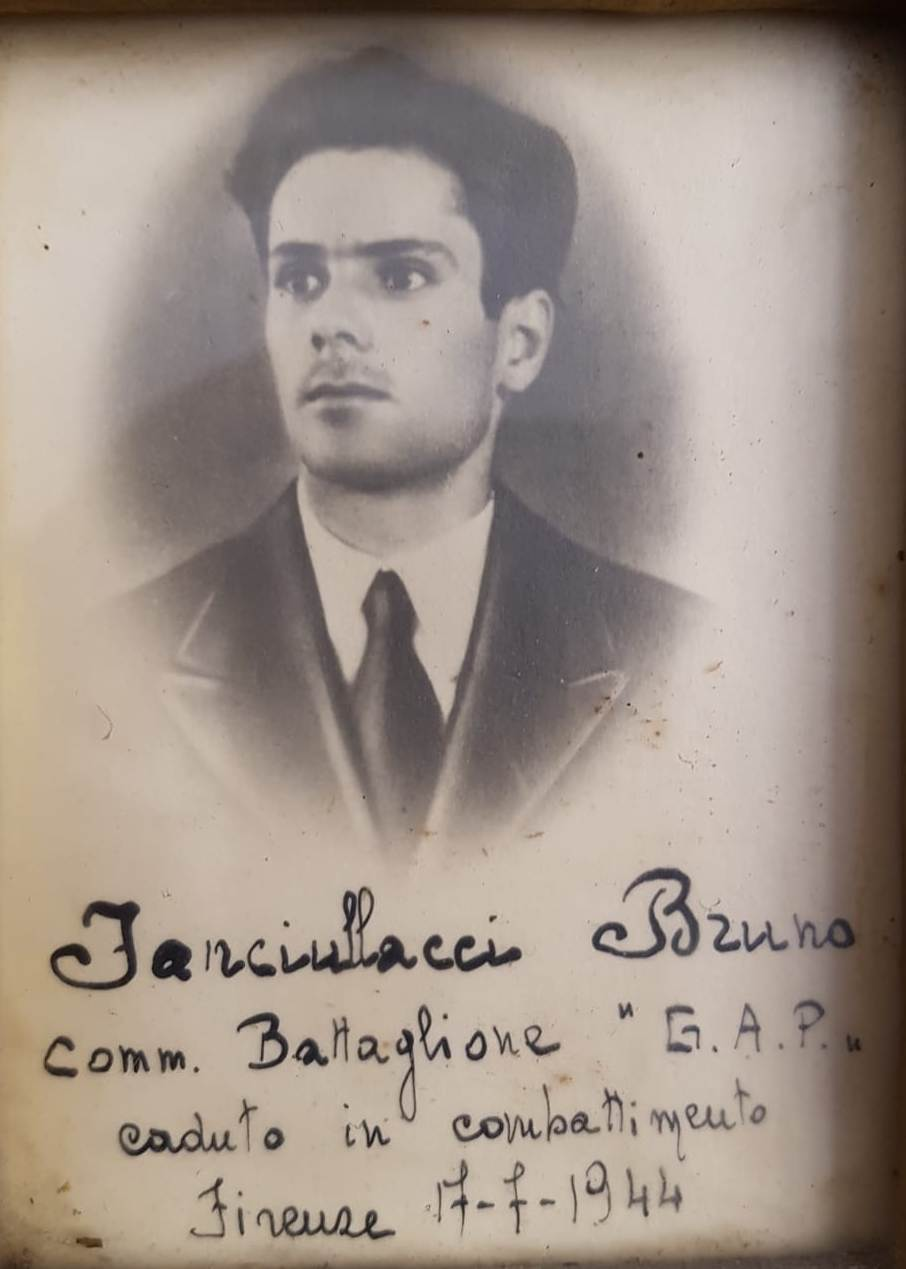
Bruno Fanciullacci, Gentile's assassin

On 30 March 1944, Gentile received death threats blaming him for the execution of the Martyrs of Campo di Marte by Republic of Salò troops and accusing him of promoting fascism. Only two weeks later, on 15 April 1944, Bruno Fanciullacci and Antonio Ignesti, both of whom belonged to the communist partisan organisation Gruppi di Azione Patriottica (GAP), approached Gentile in his parked car, hiding pistols behind a book. When Gentile lowered the car window to speak to them, he was immediately hit with several bullets to the chest and heart, killing him. Fanciullacci was killed several months later as he tried to escape capture.

Gentile's assassination divided the anti-fascist front. It was disapproved of by the Tuscan branch of the CLN with the sole exception of the Italian Communist Party, which approved the assassination and claimed responsibility for it.

Gentile was buried in the church of Santa Croce in Florence.

== Philosophy ==
Patrick Romanell, philosopher and translator of the work of Benedetto Croce, wrote that Gentile "holds the honor of having been the most rigorous neo-Hegelian in the entire history of Western philosophy and the dishonor of having been the official philosopher of Fascism in Italy." Gentile's philosophical basis for fascism was rooted in his understanding of ontology and epistemology, in which he found vindication for the rejection of individualism and acceptance of collectivism, with the state as the ultimate location of authority and loyalty outside of which individuality had no meaning (and which in turn helped justify the totalitarian dimension of fascism).

Gentile enjoyed fruitful intellectual relations with Croce from 1899—and particularly during their joint editorship of La Critica from 1903 to 1922—but broke philosophically and politically from Croce in the early 1920s over Gentile's embrace of fascism. (Croce assesses their philosophical disagreement in Una discussione tra filosofi amici in Conversazioni Critiche, II.)

Ultimately, Gentile foresaw a social order wherein opposites of all kinds were not to be considered as existing independently from each other; that 'publicness' and 'privateness' as broad interpretations were currently false as imposed by all former kinds of government, including capitalism and communism; and that only the reciprocal totalitarian state of corporatism, a fascist state, could defeat these problems which are made from reifying as an external reality that which is in fact, to Gentile, only a reality in thinking. Whereas it was common in the philosophy of the time to see the conditional subject as abstract and the object as concrete, Gentile postulated (after Hegel) the opposite, that the subject is concrete and the object a mere abstraction (or rather, that what was conventionally dubbed "subject" is in fact only conditional object, and that the true subject is the act of being or essence of the object).

Gentile was, because of his actualist system, a notable philosophical presence across Europe during his time. At its base, Gentile's brand of idealism asserted the primacy of the "pure act" of thinking. This act is foundational to all human experience and involves a process of "reflective awareness" (in Italian, "l'atto del pensiero, pensiero pensante") that is constitutive of the Absolute and revealed in education. Gentile's emphasis on seeing Mind as the Absolute signalled his "revival of the idealist doctrine of the autonomy of the mind." It also connected his philosophical work to his vocation as a teacher. In actual idealism, then, pedagogy is transcendental and provides the process by which the Absolute is revealed. His idea of a transcending truth above positivism garnered particular attention by emphasizing that all modes of sensation only take the form of ideas within one's mind; in other words, they are mental constructs. To Gentile, for example, even the correlation of the function and location of the physical brain with the functions of the physical body was merely a consistent creation of the mind, and not of the brain (itself a creation of the mind). Observations like this have led some commentators to view Gentile's philosophy as a kind of "absolute solipsism," expressing the idea "that only the spirit or mind is real".

Actual idealism also touches on ideas of concern to theology. An example of actual idealism in theology is the idea that although man may have invented the concept of God, it does not make God any less real in any possible sense, so long as God is not presupposed to exist as abstraction, and except in case qualities about what existence actually entails (i.e. being invented apart from the thinking that makes it) are presupposed. Benedetto Croce objected that Gentile's "pure act" is nothing other than Schopenhauer's will.

Therefore, Gentile proposed a form of what he called "absolute Immanentism" in which the divine was the present conception of reality in the totality of one's individual thinking as an evolving, growing and dynamic process. Many times accused of solipsism, Gentile maintained his philosophy to be a Humanism that sensed the possibility of nothing beyond what was colligate in perception; the self's human thinking, in order to communicate as immanence is to be human like oneself, made a cohesive empathy of the self-same, without an external division, and therefore not modelled as objects to one's own thinking. Whereas solipsism would feel trapped in the realization of its solitude, actualism rejects such privation and is an expression of the only freedom which is possible within objective contingencies, where the transcendental Self does not even exist as an object, and the dialectical co-substantiation of others necessary to understand the empirical self is felt as true others when found to be the nonrelativistic subjectivity of that whole self and essentially unified with the spirit of such higher self in actu, where others can be truly known, rather than thought as windowless monads.

=== Phases of his thought ===
A number of developments in Gentile's thought and career helped to define his philosophy, including:

- the definition of Actual Idealism in his work Theory of the Pure Act (1903);
- his support for the invasion of Libya (1911) and the entry of Italy into World War I (1915);
- his dispute with Benedetto Croce over the historic inevitability of Fascism;
- his role as minister of education (1922–24);
- his belief that Fascism could be made subservient to his philosophical thought, along with his gathering of influence through the work of students like Armando Carlini (leader of the so-called "right Gentilians") and Ugo Spirito (who applied Gentile's philosophy to social problems and helped codify Fascist political theory); and
- his work on the Enciclopedia Italiana (1925–43; first edition finished in 1936).

=== Gentile's definition of and vision for Fascism ===
Gentile considered Fascism the fulfilment of the Risorgimento ideals, particularly those represented by Giuseppe Mazzini and the Historical Right party.

Gentile sought to make his philosophy the basis for Fascism. However, with Gentile and with Fascism, the "problem of the party" existed by virtue of the fact that the Fascist "party", as such, arose organically rather than from a tract or pre-established socio-political doctrine. This complicated the matter for Gentile as it left no consensus to any way of thinking among Fascists, but ironically, this aspect was to Gentile's view of how a state or party doctrine should live out its existence: with natural organic growth and dialectical opposition intact. The fact that Mussolini gave credence to Gentile's viewpoints via Gentile's authorship helped with an official consideration, even though the "problem of the party" continued to exist for Mussolini as well.

Gentile placed himself within the Hegelian tradition but also sought to distance himself from those views he considered erroneous. He criticised Hegel's dialectic (of Idea-Nature-Spirit), and instead proposed that everything is Spirit, with the dialectic residing in the pure act of thinking. Gentile believed Marx's conception of the dialectic to be the fundamental flaw of his application to system making. To the neo-Hegelian Gentile, Marx had made the dialectic into an external object and therefore had abstracted it by making it part of a material process of historical development. The dialectic to Gentile could only be something of human precepts, something that is an active part of human thinking. It was, to Gentile, a concrete subject and not abstract object. This Gentile expounded on how humans think in forms wherein one side of a dual opposite could not be thought of without its complement.

"Upward" wouldn't be known without "downward" and "heat" couldn't be known without "cold", while each are opposites they are co-dependent for either one's realization: these were creations that existed as dialectic only in human thinking and couldn't be confirmed outside of which, and especially could not be said to exist in a condition external to human thought like independent matter and a world outside of personal subjectivity or as an empirical reality when not conceived in unity and from the standpoint of the human mind.

To Gentile, Marx's externalising of the dialectic was essentially a fetishistic mysticism. Though when viewed externally thus, it followed that Marx could then make claims to the effect of what state or condition the dialectic objectively existed in history, a posteriori of where any individual's opinion was while comporting oneself to the totalized whole of society. i.e. people themselves could, by such a view, be ideologically 'backwards' and left behind from the current state of the dialectic and not themselves be part of what is actively creating the dialectic as-it-is.

Gentile thought this was absurd, and that there was no 'positive' independently existing dialectical object. Rather, the dialectic was natural to the state, as it is. Meaning that the interests composing the state are composing the dialectic by their living organic process of holding oppositional views within that state, and unified therein. It is the mean condition of those interests as long as they exist. Even criminality is unified as a necessary dialectic to be subsumed into the state and a creation and natural outlet of the dialectic of the positive state, as ever it is.

This view (influenced by the Hegelian theory of the state) justified the corporative system, wherein the individualised and particular interests of all divergent groups were to be personally incorporated into the state ("Stato etico"), each to be considered a bureaucratic branch of the state itself and given official leverage. Gentile, rather than believing the private to be swallowed synthetically within the public as Marx would have it in his objective dialectic, believed that public and private were a priori identified with each other in an active and subjective dialectic: one could not be subsumed fully into the other as they already are beforehand the same. In such a manner, each is the other after their own fashion and from their respective, relative, and reciprocal position. Yet both constitute the state itself, and neither are free from it; nothing ever being truly free from it, the state (as in Hegel) exists as an eternal condition and not an objective, abstract collection of atomistic values and facts of the particulars about what is positively governing the people at any given time.

== Works ==
- On the Comedies of Antonfrancesco Grazzi, "Il Lasca" (1896)
- A Criticism of Historical Materialism (1897)
- Rosmini and Gioberti (1898)
- The Philosophy of Marx (1899)
- The Concept of History (1899)
- The teaching of philosophy in high schools (1900)
- The scientific concept of pedagogy (1900)
- On the Life and Writings of B. Spaventa (1900)
- Hegelian Controversy (1902)
- Secondary school unit and freedom of studies (1902)
- Philosophy and Empiricism (1902)
- The Rebirth of Idealism (1903)
- From Genovesi to Galluppi (1903)
- Studies on the Roman Stoicism of the 1st century BC (1904)
- High School Reforms (1905)
- The Son of G. B. Vico (1905)
- The Reform of the Middle School (1906)
- The various editions of T. Campanella 's De sensu rerum (1906)
- Giordano Bruno in the History of Culture (1907)
- The first process of heresy of T. Campanella (1907)
- Vincenzo Gioberti in the first centenary of his birth (1907)
- The Concept of the History of Philosophy (1908)
- School and Philosophy (1908)
- Modernism and the Relationship between Religion and Philosophy (1909)
- Bernardino Telesio (1911)
- The Theory of Mind as Pure Act (1912)
- The Philosophical Library of Palermo (1912)
- On Current Idealism: Memories and Confessions (1913)
- The Problems of Schooling and Italian Thought (1913)
- Reform of Hegelian Dialectics (1913)
- Summary of Pedagogy as a Philosophical Science (1913)
- The wrongs and the rights of positivism (1914)
- The Philosophy of War (1914)
- Pascuale Galluppi, a Jacobine? (1914)
- Writings of life and ideas by V. Gioberti (1915)
- Donato Jaja (1915)
- The Bible of the Letters in Print by V. Gioberti (1915)
- Vichian Studies (1915)
- Pure experience and historical reality (1915)
- For the Reform of Philosophical Insights (1916)
- The concept of man in the Renaissance (1916)
- The Foundations of the Philosophy of Law (1916)
- General theory of the spirit as pure act (1916)
- The origins of contemporary philosophy in Italy (1917)
- System of logic as theory of knowledge (1917)
- The historical character of Italian philosophy (1918)
- Is there an Italian school? (1918)
- Marxism of Benedict Croce (1918)
- The sunset of Sicilian culture (1919)
- Mazzini (1919)
- The political realism of V. Gioberti (1919)
- War and Faith (1919)
- After the Victory (1920)
- The post-war school problem (1920)
- Reform of Education (1920)
- Discourses of Religion (1920)
- Giordano Bruno and the Thought of the Renaissance (1920)
- Art and Religion (1920)
- Bertrando Spaventa (1920)
- Defense of Philosophy (1920)
- History of the Piedmontese culture of the 2nd half of the 16th century (1921)
- Fragments of Aesthetics and Literature (1921)
- Glimmers of the New Italy (1921)
- Education and the secular school (1921)
- Critical Essays (1921)
- The Philosophy of Dante (1921)
- The modern concept of science and the university problem (1921)
- G. Capponi and the Tuscan culture of the 20th century (1922)
- Studies on the Renaissance (1923)
- Dante and Manzoni, an essay on Art and Religion (1923)
- The Prophets of the Italian Risorgimento (1923)
- On the Logic of the Concrete (1924)
- Preliminaries in the Study of the Child (1924)
- School Reform (1924)
- Fascism and Sicily (1924)
- Fascism to the Government of the School (1924)
- What is fascism (1925) -- Translated into English from the Italian (Che cosa è il fascismo). Sunny Lou Publishing Company, ISBN 978-1-95539-236-5, 2023)
- The New Middle School (1925)
- Current Warnings (1926)
- Fragments of History of Philosophy (1926)
- Critical Essays (1926)
- The Legacy of Vittorio Alfieri (1926)
- Fascist Culture (1926)
- The religious problem in Italy (1927)
- Italian thought of the nineteenth century (1928)
- Fascism and Culture (1928)
- The Philosophy of Fascism (1928)
- The Great Council's Law (1928)
- Manzoni and Leopardi (1929)
- Origins and Doctrine of Fascism (1929)
- The philosophy of art (1931)
- The Reform of the School in Italy (1932)
- Introduction to Philosophy (1933)
- The Woman and the Child (1934)
- Origins and Doctrine of Fascism (1934)
- Economics and Ethics (1934)
- Leonardo da Vinci (Gentile was one of the contributors, 1935)

=== Collected works ===
==== Systematic works ====
- I–II. Summary of pedagogy as a philosophical science (Vol. I: General pedagogy; Vol. II: Teaching).
- III. The general theory of the spirit as pure act.
- IV. The foundations of the philosophy of law.
- V–VI. The System of Logic as Theory of Knowledge (Vol. 2).
- VII. Reform of education.
- VIII. The philosophy of art.
- IX. Genesis and structure of society.

==== Historical works ====
- X. History of philosophy. From the origins to Plato.
- XI. History of Italian philosophy (up to Lorenzo Valla).
- XII. The Problems of Schooling and Italian Thinking.
- XIII. Studies on Dante.
- XIV The Italian thought of the Renaissance.
- XV. Studies on the Renaissance.
- XVI. Vichian Studies.
- XVII. The legacy of Vittorio Alfieri.
- XVIII–XIX. History of Italian philosophy from Genovesi to Galluppi (vol.2).
- XXI. Albori of the new Italy (vol.2).
- XXII. Vincenzo Cook. Studies and notes.
- XXIII. Gino Capponi and Tuscan culture in the decades of the century.
- XXIV. Manzoni and Leopardi.
- XXV. Rosmini and Gioberti.
- XXVI. The prophets of the Italian Risorgimento.
- XXVII. Reform of Hegelian Dialectics.
- XXVIII. Marx's philosophy.
- XXIX. Bertrando Spaventa.
- XXX. The sunset of the Sicilian culture.
- XXXI-XXXIV. The origins of contemporary philosophy in Italy. (Vol. I: Platonists, Vol II: Positivists, Vol III and IV: Neo-Kantians and Hegelians).
- XXXV. Modernism and the relationship between religion and philosophy.

==== Various works ====
- XXXVI. Introduction to philosophy.
- XXXVII. Religious Speeches.
- XXXVIII. Defence of philosophy.
- XXXIX. Education and lay school.
- XL. The new middle school.
- XLI. School Reform in Italy.
- XLII. Preliminaries in the study of the child.
- XLIII. War and Faith.
- XLIV. After the win.
- XLV-XLVI. Politics and Culture (Vol. 2).

==== Letter collections ====
- I–II. Letter from Gentile-Jaja (Vol. 2)
- III–VII. Letters to Benedetto Croce (Vol. 5)
- VIII. Letter from Gentile-D'Ancona
- IX. Letter from Gentile-Omodeo
- X. Letter from Gentile-Maturi
- XI. Letter from Gentile-Pintor
- XII. Letter from Gentile-Chiavacci
- XIII. Letter from Gentile-Calogero
- XIV. Letter from Gentile-Donati

== Sources ==
- A. James Gregor, Giovanni Gentile: Philosopher of Fascism. Piscataway, NJ: Transaction Publishers, 2001.
