= Emilio Chiovenda =

Italian botanist (1871–1941)

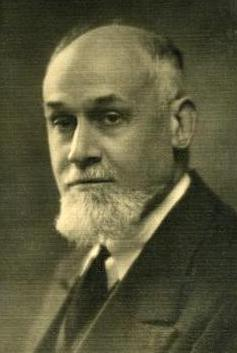
- Born: 18 May 1871; Rome, Kingdom of Italy
- Died: 19 February 1941 (aged 69); Bologna, Kingdom of Italy
- Resting place: Cemetery of Premosello, Piedmont, Italy
- Education: University of Rome
- Scientific career
- Fields: Botany
- Workplaces: Colonial Herbarium (Rome and Florence); University of Catania; University of Modena; Botanical Institute (Bologna)
- Doctoral advisor: Pietro Romualdo Pirotta
- Author abbrev. (botany): Chiov.

Emilio Chiovenda (18 May 1871 – 19 February 1941) was an Italian botanist.

Chiovenda was born in Rome in 1871 to a family originating from Premosello, in the rural Piedmont. He was educated at the Collegio Rosmini in Stresa and Domodossola College before graduating in Natural Sciences from the University of Rome in 1898. He frequently collaborated with Pietro Romualdo Pirotta, under whom he had studied in Rome, including on an unfinished catalogue of flora in Rome and on The flora of the colony of Eritrea.

He initially specialised in the flora of the Val d'Ossola valley in Piedmont, where his family had ancestral roots. He collected around 20,000 plant samples, now preserved at the department of Experimental Evolutionary Biology at Bologna University.

At the turn of the century he was appointed the first curator of the Colonial Herbarium (Erbario coloniale) in Rome, founded to preserve the plant species brought back by scientific expeditions to Italian colonies in East Africa in the preceding years. In 1909 he travelled extensively in Eritrea and Ethiopia to study indigenous plants, which made him a global authority on the flora of East Africa.

In 1915 he moved with the Colonial Herbarium from Rome to Florence.

From 1926 to 1929 he was professor of botany at the University of Catania.

In 1930 he was appointed dean of the Faculty of Science at the University of Modena. In 1935 he moved to Bologna, where he headed the Botanical Institute and managed the Botanical Garden.

In 1941 Chiovenda died of cerebral thrombosis in Bologna. He was buried in the cemetery of the village of Premosello in Piedmont.

== Selected publications ==
- Flora della Colonia Eritrea 1903 (in collaboration with Romualdo Pirotta)
- Flora delle Alpi Lepontine occidentali (1904–1935)
- Flora somala Roma, Sindacato italiano arti grafiche, 1929
- Pteridophyta Catania, Tip. Giandolfo, 1929
- Il papiro in Italia : un interessante problema di biologia, sistematica e fitogeografia Forli, Tip. Valbonesi, 1931
