= 2023 Italian local elections =

The 2023 Italian local elections were held in various Italian local communities on 14–15 May 2023, with a run-off round on 28–29 May. Mayors of towns and cities across the country were elected.

Direct elections were held in 600 municipalities; in each comune were chosen mayor and members of the City Council. Of the 790 municipalities, 15 were provincial capitals. In Friuli-Venezia Giulia, the elections were held on 2–3 April with a second ballot on 17–18 April; in Aosta Valley and Trentino-Alto Adige were held on 21 May, with a possible second ballot on 4 June, and in Sicily and Sardinia on 28–29 May, with a possible second round on 11–12 June.

== Municipal elections ==
=== Overall results ===
Majority of each coalition in the municipalities (comuni) with a population higher than 15,000:

Coalition	Comuni
Centre-right coalition	50
Centre-left coalition	34
Five Star Movement	2
Independents and others	25
Total	111

By party

Party results in the main municipalities:

Party	%
Democratic Party	
Five Star Movement	
Lega	
Forza Italia	
Brothers of Italy	
Greens and Left Alliance	
Action – Italia Viva	
Centre-right civic lists	
Centre-left civic lists	

=== Mayoral election results ===
Centre-left coalition
Centre-right coalition
Five Star Movement
Civic lists
Centrist coalition
Right-wing coalition
Left-wing coalition
Prefectural commissioner

Region	City	Population	Incumbent mayor	Elected mayor	1st round		2nd round		Seats	Source
Region	City	Population	Incumbent mayor	Elected mayor	Votes	%	Votes	%	Seats	Source
Lombardy	Brescia	196,640	Emilio Del Bono (PD)	Laura Castelletti (Ind.)	46,198	54.84%	—	—	20 / 32	
Lombardy	Sondrio	21,558	Marco Scaramellini (Ind.)	Marco Scaramellini (Ind.)	5,681	57.86%	—	—	20 / 32	
Veneto	Treviso	84,669	Mario Conte (Lega)	Mario Conte (Lega)	23,403	64.75%	—	—	22 / 32	
Veneto	Vicenza	111,980	Francesco Rucco (Ind.)	Giacomo Possamai (PD)	21,896	46.23%	23,416	50.54%	20 / 32	
Friuli-Venezia Giulia	Udine	99,242	Pietro Fontanini (Lega)	Alberto Felice De Toni (Ind.)	16,762	39.70%	18,576	52.80%	24 / 40	
Liguria	Imperia	42,328	Claudio Scajola (Ind.)	Claudio Scajola (Ind.)	12,173	62.97%	—	—	21 / 32	
Tuscany	Massa	68,946	Maria Rosa Trio (Note: Prefectural commissioner replacing mayor Francesco Persiani (Lega) since 3 March 2023.)	Francesco Persiani (Lega)	11,872	35.42%	15,719	54.36%	20 / 32	
Tuscany	Pisa	90,408	Michele Conti (Ind.)	Michele Conti (Ind.)	20,091	49.96%	21,142	52.33%	20 / 32	
Tuscany	Siena	53,772	Luigi De Mossi (Ind.)	Nicoletta Fabio (Ind.)	8,249	30.51%	12,545	52.16%	20 / 32	
Umbria	Terni	111,317	Leonardo Latini (Lega)	Stefano Bandecchi (AP)	13,647	28.14%	19,748	54.62%	20 / 32	
Marche	Ancona	100,861	Valeria Mancinelli (PD)	Daniele Silvetti (FI)	19,643	45.11%	21,279	51.73%	20 / 32	
Lazio	Latina	127,315	Carmine Valente (Note: Prefectural commissioner replacing mayor Damiano Coletta (Ind.) since 29 September 2022.)	Matilde Celentano (FdI)	42,831	70.68%	—	—	23 / 32	
Abruzzo	Teramo	54,436	Gianguido D'Alberto (Ind.)	Gianguido D'Alberto (Ind.)	16,267	54.47%	—	—	20 / 32	
Apulia	Brindisi	87,534	Riccardo Rossi (EV)	Giuseppe Marchionna (Ind.)	17,933	44.00%	16,814	53.99%	20 / 32	
Apulia	Foggia	144,586	Prefectural commission (Note: Replacing mayor Franco Landella (Lega) since 25 May 2021.)	Maria Aida Episcopo (Ind.)	36,801	52.78%	—	—	20 / 32	
Sicily	Catania	311,763	Piero Mattei (Note: Prefectural commissioner replacing mayor Salvo Pogliese (FdI) since 30 January 2023.)	Enrico Trantino (FdI)	85,700	66.13%	—	—	30 / 36	
Sicily	Ragusa	73,631	Giuseppe Cassì (Ind.)	Giuseppe Cassì (Ind.)	21,674	62.92%	—	—	17 / 24	
Sicily	Syracuse	121,933	Francesco Italia (Ind.)	Francesco Italia (Az)	12,893	23.89%	21,501	55.39%	8 / 32	
Sicily	Trapani	68,370	Giacomo Tranchida (PD)	Giacomo Tranchida (PD)	11,364	42.45%	—	—	16 / 24	
