= Luigi Sbano =

Member of the National Council
- In office 25 September 1945 – 25 June 1946

Mayor of Foggia
- In office January 1944 – January 1946
- Preceded by: Giovanni Pepe
- Succeeded by: Giuseppe Imperiale

Personal details
- Born: 24 August 1899 Foggia, Kingdom of Italy
- Died: 1 May 1955 (aged 55) Foggia, Italy
- Party: Labour Democratic Party
- Occupation: Lawyer, journalist

Luigi Sbano (24 August 1899 – 1 May 1955) was an Italian lawyer, journalist and politician. An anti-fascist and local leader of the Labour Democratic Party, he served as mayor of Foggia from 1944 to 1946 and was a member of the National Council between 1945 and 1946. He played a role in the reconstruction of Foggia following the heavy wartime bombings of the city.
