= Trantino =

Trantino is a surname. Notable people with the surname include:

- Enrico Trantino (born 1963), Italian Lawyer and politician, son of Vincenzo
- Thomas Trantino (born 1938), American convicted murderer
- Vincenzo Trantino (1934–2024), Italian lawyer and politician
