= Timeline of Vicenza =

The following is a timeline of the history of the city of Vicenza in the Veneto region of Italy.

== Prior to 18th century ==
- 2nd–6th century – Roman Catholic Diocese of Vicenza established.
- 569 – Lombards in power.^{(it)}
- 825 – Regional school established in Vicenza.
- 1117 – Earthquake.
- 1160 – Basilica of Saints Felix and Fortunatus (church) tower rebuilt.
- 1167 – Vicenza joins the Lombard League.
- 13th century – Walls of Vicenza built.
- 1260 – Santa Corona church construction begins.
- 1280 – Chiesa di San Lorenzo (Vicenza) (church) construction begins.
- 1311 – Scaligeri of Verona in power.
- 1380 – Public clock installed (approximate date).
- 1387 – Visconti of Milan in power.
- 1404 – Vicenza becomes part of the Republic of Venice (until 1797).
- 1440 – Casa Pigafetta built.
- 1474 – Printing press in operation.
- 1509 – Battle of the citadel of Vicenza between the Republic of Venice and the Holy Roman Empire
- 1549 – Basilica (town hall) Palladian remodelling begins.
- 1550 – Palazzo Chiericati construction begins.
- 1552 – Palazzo Thiene built.
- 1555 – Accademia Olimpica (learned society) founded.
- 1566
  - Palazzo Valmarana built.
  - Villa Capra "La Rotonda" construction begins near city.
- 1585 – Teatro Olimpico (theatre) opens.
- 1614 – Basilica (town hall) Palladian completed.

== 18th–19th centuries ==
- 1708 – Biblioteca Civica Bertoliana (library) opens.
- 1814 – Austrians in power.
- 1833 – Cimitero acattolico di Vicenza (cemetery) established.
- 1842 – 25 March: Future writer Antonio Fogazzaro born in Vicenza.
- 1846 – Padua–Vicenza railway begins operating.
- 1848 – Cimitero Maggiore di Vicenza (cemetery) established.
- 1851 – Vicenza railway station in operation.
- 1866 – Vicenza becomes part of the Kingdom of Italy.
- 1876
  - Ferrovia Vicenza-Schio (railway) begins operating.
  - Il Berico newspaper begins publication.
- 1877 – Ferrovia Vicenza-Treviso (railway) begins operating.
- 1884 – Horse-drawn Vicenza tram begins operating.
- 1892 – Banca Cattolica Vicentina (Catholic bank) established.
- 1897 – Population: 42,020.

== 20th century ==
- 1901 – Population (commune): 47,558.
- 1902 – Vicenza Calcio football club formed.
- 1906 – AIM Vicenza (transit entity) formed.
- 1910 – Electric tram begins operating.
- 1911 – Population: 54,555.
- 1920 – Luigi Faccio becomes mayor.
- 1921 – Vicenza Airport built.
- 1928 – Vicenza trolleybus begins operating.
- 1931 – Population: 65,177.
- 1935 – Stadio Romeo Menti (stadium) opens.
- 1944 – Bombing of Vicenza in World War II.
- 1945 – Il Giornale di Vicenza newspaper in publication.
- 1948 – Giuseppe Zampieri becomes mayor.
- 1951 – Ferrovie e Tramvie Vicentine (transit entity) formed.
- 1961 – Population: 98,019.
- 1962 – Giorgio Sala becomes mayor.
- 1971 – Population: 116,620.
- 1978 – TVA Vicenza (television) begins broadcasting.
- 1990 – Achille Variati becomes mayor.
- 1998 – Enrico Hüllweck becomes mayor.

== 21st century ==
- 2008 – Achille Variati becomes mayor again.
- 2010 – Veneto flood of 2010.^{(it)}
- 2013 – Population: 113,639.

== See also ==
- History of Vicenza
- List of mayors of Vicenza, 1866–present
- List of podestà of Vicenza, 12th–19th centuries
- List of bishops of Vicenza (it)
- History of urban development of Vicenza
- History of the Jews in Vicenza
- History of religious architecture in Vicenza
- Timeline of the Republic of Venice, of which Vicenza was part 1404–1797
- Veneto history (it) (region)

Timelines of other cities in the macroregion of Northeast Italy:^{(it)}

- Emilia-Romagna region: Timeline of Bologna; Ferrara; Forlì; Modena; Parma; Piacenza; Ravenna; Reggio Emilia; Rimini
- Friuli-Venezia Giulia region: Timeline of Trieste
- Trentino-South Tyrol region: Timeline of Trento
- Veneto region: Timeline of Padua; Treviso; Venice; Verona

== Bibliography ==
=== in English ===
- William Smith, ed. (1872) [1854]. "Vicentia". Dictionary of Greek and Roman Geography. London: John Murray. hdl:2027/hvd.ah5cur.
- "Vicenza" . Encyclopædia Britannica. Vol. 24 (9th ed.). 1888. p. 210.
- "Vicenza". Hand-book for Travellers in Northern Italy (16th ed.). London: John Murray. 1897. OCLC 2231483.
- Bumpus, T. Francis (1900). "Vicenza". Cathedrals and Churches of Northern Italy. London: Laurie.
- Vincent, Benjamin (1910), "Vicenza", Haydn's Dictionary of Dates (25th ed.), London: Ward, Lock & Co., hdl:2027/uc2.ark:/13960/t41r6xh8t
- Ashby, Thomas (1910). "Vicenza" . Encyclopædia Britannica. Vol. 28 (11th ed.). p. 20.
- "Vicenza", Northern Italy (14th ed.), Leipzig: Karl Baedeker, 1913 (+ 1870 ed.)
- Domenico, Roy (2002). "Veneto: Vicenza". Regions of Italy: a Reference Guide to History and Culture. Greenwood. pp. 392+. ISBN 0313307334.
- Christopher Kleinhenz, ed. (2004). "Vicenza". Medieval Italy: an Encyclopedia. Routledge. pp. 1140+. ISBN 0415939291.

=== in Italian ===
- B. Pagliarini. Croniche di Vicenza, 1663
- Castellini, Silvestro. Storia della città di Vicenza. F. Vendramini Mosca. 1783-1785
- Giovan-Battista Berti (1822). Guida per Vicenza. Venice: Francesco Andreola.
- Cantù, C. (1861), "Vicenza e il suo territorio", Grande illustrazione del Lombardo-Veneto, vol. 6, Milan
- B. Morsolin. Fonti della storia di Vicenza, 1880
- Carlo Lozzi (1887). "Storie de'Municipii: Vicenza". Biblioteca istorica della antica e nuova Italia (in Italian). Vol. 2. Imola. pp. 485+. OCLC 12117233. (bibliography)
- Nicola Bernardini, ed. (1890). "Provincia di Vicenza". Guida della stampa periodica italiana (in Italian). Lecce: R. Tipografia editrice salentina dei fratelli Spacciante.
- S. Rumor. Bibliografia storica della città e provincia di Vicenza, 1916
- Giuseppe Pettinà (1922). Vicenza. Collezione di monografie illustrate. Serie 1: Italia artistica.17 (3rd ed.). Bergamo: Istituto italiano d'arti grafiche.
- "Vicenza", Enciclopedia Italiana (Treccani) (in Italian), 1937
