= Maria Aida Episcopo =

Italian politician (born 1963)

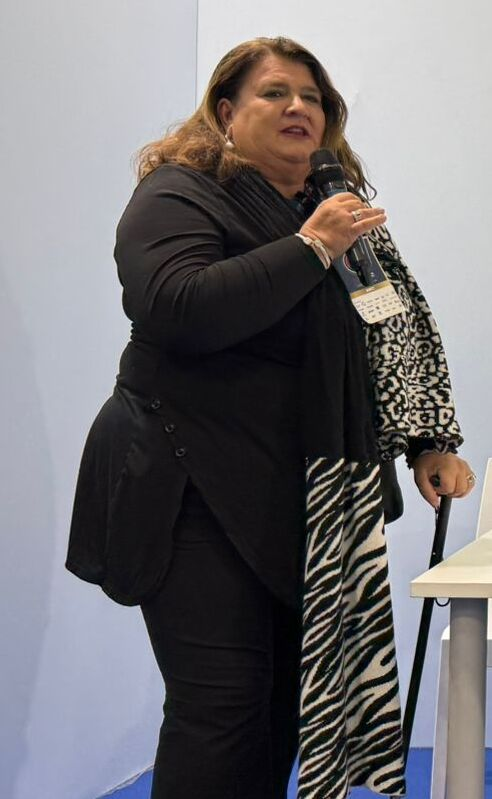

Mayor of Foggia
- Incumbent
- Assumed office 30 October 2023
- Preceded by: Franco Landella

Personal details
- Born: Maria Aida Tatiana Episcopo; 31 March 1963 (age 63) Foggia, Apulia, Italy
- Party: Centre-left independent
- Education: University of L'Aquila; University of Naples Federico II; University of Bari; Giustino Fortunato University
- Profession: Teacher, school principal

Maria Aida Tatiana Episcopo (born 31 March 1963) is an Italian politician serving as Mayor of Foggia since 2023.

== Biography ==
Born in Foggia, Episcopo obtained four degrees: in Physical Education from the University of L'Aquila, in Pedagogy from the Federico II of Naples, in Political Sciences from the University of Bari and a master's degree in Behavioral Psychology from the Giustino Fortunato University.

From 1984 to 2007, Episcopo first taught physical education and then legal and economic disciplines, philosophy and educational sciences at various secondary schools in the province of Foggia. Since 2007 she has been school principal at the IISS Notarangelo-Rosati in Foggia.

From 2012 to 2014, Episcopo has been deputy mayor of Foggia and councilor for education in the centre-left junta led by Gianni Mongelli.

=== Mayor of Foggia ===
At the 2023 local elections called after 18 months of extraordinary administration, Episcopo announced her candidacy for the office of Mayor of Foggia, supported by a broad progressive camp, including the Democratic Party, the Five Star Movement, the Greens and Left Alliance, Action and numerous civic lists.

Episcopo is elected in the first round with 52.78% of the votes, thus becoming the first female mayor of the Daunian city.

== See also ==
- 2023 Italian local elections
- List of mayors of Foggia

Political offices
Preceded by Franco Landella	Mayor of Foggia since 2023	Incumbent
