= Vittorio de Miro d'Aieta =

Italian educator and politician

Mayor of Foggia
- In office 1957–1961
- Preceded by: Girolamo Caggianelli
- Succeeded by: Carlo Forcella

Personal details
- Born: 28 August 1918 Naples, Kingdom of Italy
- Died: 2 April 1987 (aged 68) Foggia, Italy
- Party: Christian Democracy
- Education: University of Naples Federico II
- Occupation: Educator, school principal

Vittorio de Miro d'Aieta (28 August 1918 – 2 April 1987) was an Italian educator and politician who served as mayor of Foggia from 1957 to 1961. A member of the Christian Democracy party, he was active in local government and educational administration for several decades.

== Life and career ==
Born in Naples into a cadet branch of the noble d'Aieta family, De Miro d'Aieta graduated in philosophy from the University of Naples and later pursued legal studies in Florence. In 1941 he won a national teaching competition and moved to Foggia, where he spent most of his professional and political career.

Before becoming mayor, he served as a municipal and provincial councillor and held positions as municipal assessor for public education and provincial assessor for finance. During his mayoralty, he led the city administration of Foggia between 1957 and 1961.

After his political career, De Miro d'Aieta became a school principal and headed several secondary schools in the province of Foggia, including the Liceo classico "Vincenzo Lanza", which he directed from 1976 to 1985.

He was also active in civic organizations, serving as president of the provincial committee of the Italian Red Cross and as a founding member of the Rotary Club of Foggia.
