= Marino Quaresimin =

Italian politician and mayor (1937–2020)

Mayor of Vicenza
- In office 7 May 1995 – 25 June 1998
- Preceded by: Achille Variati
- Succeeded by: Enrico Hüllweck

Personal details
- Born: 22 November 1937 Vicenza, Italy
- Died: 20 March 2020 (aged 82) Vicenza, Italy
- Cause of death: COVID-19
- Party: Democratic Party (2007–2020)
- Other political affiliations: Christian Democracy (till 1994); People's Party (1994-2002); The Daisy (2002-2007)
- Education: University of Padua

Marino Quaresimin (22 November 1937 – 20 March 2020) was an Italian politician who served as mayor of Vicenza from 1995 to 1998.

== Biography ==
He was born in Vicenza, Italy.

Quaresimin served as the mayor of Vicenza from 1995 to 1998. During his political career, he was a member of the Italian People's Party, but later switched to The Daisy party. From 1999 to 2008, he was a member of the Vicenza City Council.

Quaresimin died in Vicenza from COVID-19 on 20 March 2020, aged 82, during the COVID-19 pandemic in Italy.

== Honors ==
- Order of Merit of the Italian Republic (5th Class/Knight)
- Order of Merit of the Italian Republic (3rd Class/Commander)
