= Giuseppe Imperiale =

Italian politician (1897–1964)

Mayor of Foggia
- In office 1947–1948
- Preceded by: Luigi Sbano
- Succeeded by: Paolo Telesforo

Member of the Constituent Assembly of Italy
- In office 25 June 1946 – 31 January 1948

Member of the Chamber of Deputies
- In office 8 May 1948 – 24 June 1953

Member of the Senate of the Republic
- In office 25 June 1953 – 15 May 1963

Personal details
- Born: 24 September 1897 Foggia, Kingdom of Italy
- Died: 24 February 1964 (aged 66) Foggia, Italy
- Party: Italian Communist Party
- Occupation: Railway worker

Giuseppe Imperiale (24 September 1897 – 24 February 1964) was an Italian politician of the Italian Communist Party. He served in the Constituent Assembly of Italy, was a member of the Chamber of Deputies from 1948 to 1953, and a member of the Senate from 1953 to 1963. He was also mayor of Foggia from 1947 to 1948.
