= Francesco Giubilei =

Italian publisher and conservative columnist (born 1992)

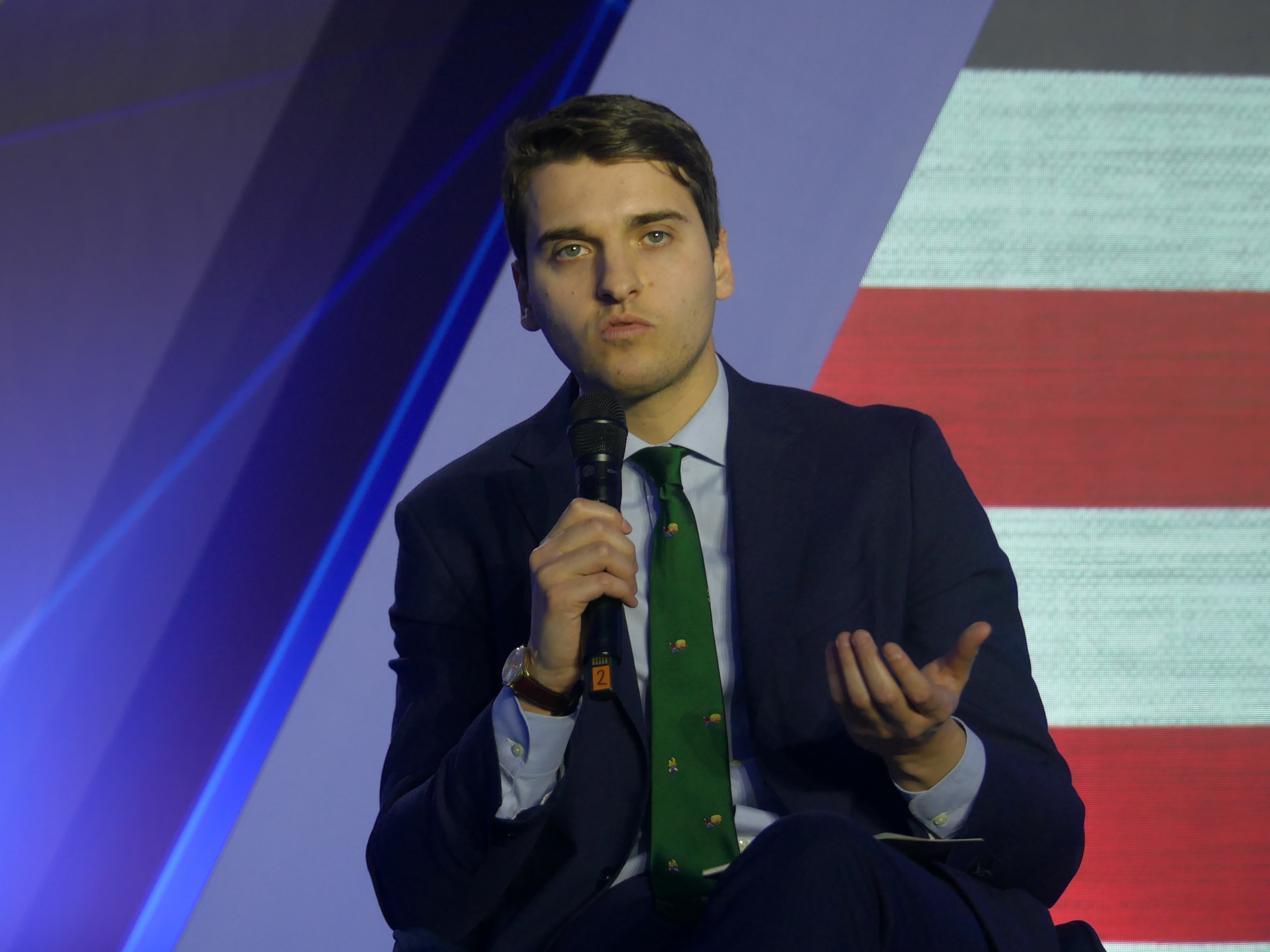
- Giubilei at the 2023 CPAC Hungary
- Born: 1 January 1992 (age 34); Cesena, Italy
- Occupations: Publisher, columnist, writer
- Years active: 2008–present

Francesco Giubilei (born 1 January 1992) is an Italian publisher, columnist, and conservative writer. From December 2022 to June 2023, he was a special advisor for the Italian Minister of Culture Gennaro Sangiuliano.

== Early life and education ==
Giubilei was born in Cesena, the son of two doctors; his father, a surgeon, is from Gualdo Tadino, while his mother, a pediatrician, was born in Venezuela to a family of Italian immigrants. As a result, in addition to Italian and English, Giubilei speaks fluent Spanish. Giubilei, who resides in Rome, took a bachelor's degree in Modern Literature at Roma Tre University and a master's degree in Culture and History of publishing enterprises at the University of Milan. He also attended summer schools at the London School of Journalism and the CUNY Graduate School in New York. He wrote his first book, Giovinezza. Partitura per mandolino e canto, when he was 13 years old, and published it at the age of 15. In 2007, he won the first prize at the literary contest Titano 2007 with his short story La terza porta.

== Career ==
At the age of 16 in September 2008, Giubilei founded his first publishing house, Historica Edizioni. In 2013, he founded a second publishing house, Giubilei Regnani Editore, with businessman Giorgio Regnani. He has worked as a contributor for several media outlets, including Il Giornale, Il Messaggero, Linkiesta, La Voce di Romagna, and The American Conservative. He has also founded his own magazines and online newspapers, such as Scrivendo volo, Cultora, Atlantico Quotidiano, and Nazione Futura; the last one is also the name of a political movement (Future Nation) he founded in 2017.

From 2013 to 2016, Giubilei and Historica Edizioni were the founder and leading organizer of the Fiera del libro della Romagna, a Cesena-based independent book festival. In 2015, he started teaching at Corso di Editoria in Rome and Herzog Agenzia Letteraria in Milan. In 2017, Giubilei became adjunct professor at the Università degli Studi Giustino Fortunato in Benevento. In January 2018, he also became the president of the Tatarella Foundation, which was founded in memory to Italian politician Giuseppe Tatarella. He was a member of Italy's scientific committee on the Conference on the Future of Europe.

In 2019, Giubilei was listed by Forbes among the top 100 most influential under-30 people in Italy. In 2020, he was listed among the five best young journalists in Italy. His books have been translated into English, Spanish, Serbian, and Hungarian. In December 2022, Giubilei was made a special advisor for the Italian Minister of Culture Gennaro Sangiuliano, a position he held until his resignation in June 2023.

== Political views ==
Conservative in his politics, Giubilei is close to Brothers of Italy, the political party of the incumbent Italian prime minister Giorgia Meloni, being described as her ambassador in the United States. Giubilei is the author of Giorgia Meloni: The Revolution of the Conservatives (2020), and said in July 2022 that Meloni's political changes "helped to take the party forward. It also helped that Brothers of Italy was the only party that stayed out of Draghi's government."

During the Venezuelan presidential crisis in 2019, Giubilei established a pro-Juan Guaidó committee and recognized him as the legitimate president of Venezuela. In 2022, he said that an alliance between Russia and China would be dangerous for Europe. In February 2024, Giubilei hoped to host the 2025 Conservative Political Action Conference in Rome, and wished that both Trumpists and non-Trumpists in the Republican Party took part, with the goal of closer relations between American conservatives and European conservatives. Although Giubilei said that Donald Trump is not a true conservative and criticized what he sees as his excesses, such as the January 6 United States Capitol attack, he supported Trump over Kamala Harris in the 2024 United States presidential election. He praised Trump on foreign policy, and described him as a model.

Giubilei is the author of several books, including Conservare la natura (2020), where he argues that environmental protection and the fight against pollution are important and that the right should not hand this issue to the left. He alleges that behind the environmentalist movement there is "an attempt to spread a globalist and anti-identity ideology", which he says has its roots in the protests of 1968 and is based on "an anti-business, anti-growth vision that ignores people's social needs". Giubilei is also often a host on TV political programmes, including on La 7, where he had a diatribe with Francesca Albanese in October 2025 over Liliana Segre about the Gaza war, with Giubilei sharing and defending Segre's view that Israel is not committing a genocide against Palestinians in Gaza.

== Works ==
- Giovinezza. Partitura per mandolino e canto, Il Ponte Vecchio, 2007.
- Bastola. La signora del fuoco, ARPAnet, 2008.
- Chi è Charlie?, Historica Edizioni, 2011.
- I giovani e la letteratura, Historica Edizioni, 2013.
- Leo Longanesi. Il borghese conservatore, Odoya, 2015.
- Perché le élite ci salveranno dal populismo. All'Italia non serve l'antipolitica ma la buona politica, Società Europea di Edizioni, 2015.
- Storia del pensiero conservatore. Dalla Rivoluzione francese ai giorni nostri, Giubilei Regnani, 2016. Translated in English by Regnery Publishing as The History of European Conservative Thought.
- I riferimenti culturali della Lega di Salvini, Historica Edizioni, 2018.
- Storia della cultura di destra. Dal dopoguerra al governo giallo-verde, Giubilei Regnani, 2018.
- Europa sovranista. Da Salvini alla Meloni, da Orbán alla Le Pen, Giubilei Regnani, 2019.
- Conservare la natura. Perché l'ambiente è un tema caro alla destra e ai conservatori, Giubilei Regnani, 2020.
- Giorgia Meloni. La rivoluzione dei conservatori, Giubilei Regnani, 2020.
- Strapaese. L'Italia dei paesi e delle chiese di campagna. Da Maccari a Longanesi, da Papini a Soffici, Odoya, 2021.
- Sovranità energetica. Dagli errori della transizione ecologica alla guerra in Ucraina, Giubilei Regnani, 2022.
- Gli intellettuali di destra e l'organizzazione della cultura, Oligo, 2023.
