= Vittorio Salvatori =

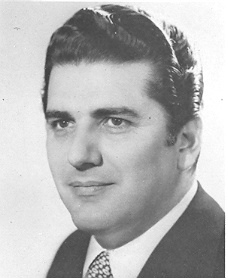

Mayor of Foggia
- In office 1966–1972
- Preceded by: Carlo Forcella
- Succeeded by: Pellegrino Graziani

Member of the Chamber of Deputies
- In office 25 May 1972 – 4 July 1976
- Constituency: Bari–Foggia

Personal details
- Born: 14 October 1929 Foggia, Kingdom of Italy
- Died: 1 December 2023 (aged 94) Foggia, Italy
- Party: Christian Democracy (until 1975); Italian Democratic Socialist Party
- Occupation: Lawyer, teacher

Vittorio Salvatori (14 October 1929 – 1 December 2023) was an Italian politician, lawyer and educator. He served as mayor of Foggia from 1966 to 1972 and as a member of the Chamber of Deputies during the sixth legislature of the Italian Republic (1972–1976). Initially elected for Christian Democracy, he later joined the Italian Democratic Socialist Party.
