= Giacomo Possamai =

Italian politician (born 1990)

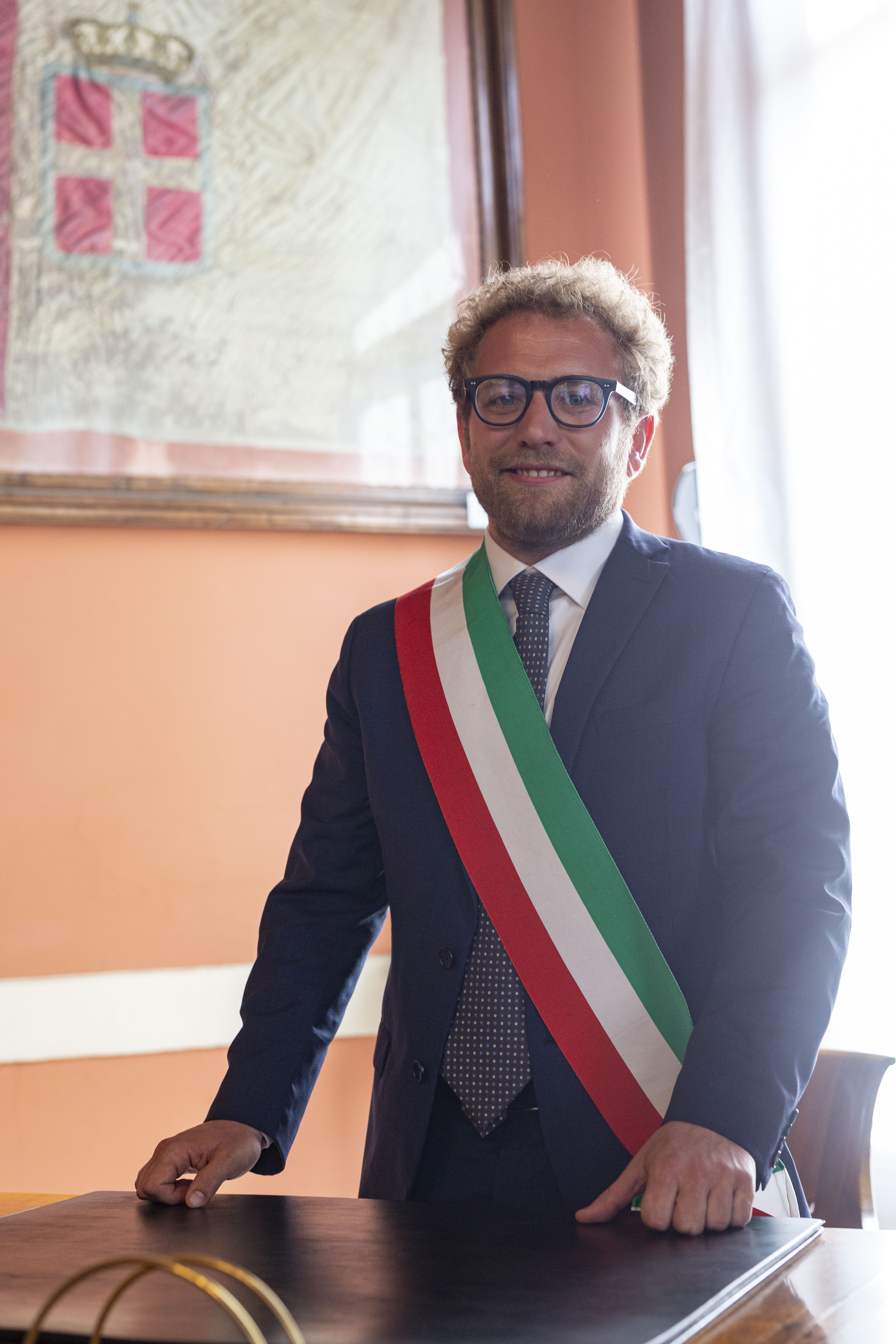

Mayor of Vicenza
- Incumbent
- Assumed office 29 May 2023
- Preceded by: Francesco Rucco

Personal details
- Born: 9 February 1990 (age 36) Vicenza, Italy
- Party: Democratic Party
- Education: University of Bologna
- Occupation: Company manager

Giacomo Possamai (born 9 February 1990) is an Italian politician.

A member of the Democratic Party, he serves as Mayor of Vicenza since 2023.

== Biography ==
From 2012 to 2016, Possamai has been the national deputy secretary of the Young Democrats and from 2013 to 2018 city councilor of Vicenza and group leader of the Democratic Party.

Between October and November 2012, Possamai participated in Barack Obama's electoral campaign within the Philadelphia Electoral Committee, with communication and data management roles.

In the regional elections of September 2020, he was elected Regional Councilor in the province of Vicenza, with over 11,000 preferences, resulting in being the most voted minority regional councilor and became the Democratic Party leader in Council and Leader of the Opposition.

=== Mayor of Vicenza ===
On 14 January 2023, Possamai announced his candidacy for Mayor of Vicenza in view of the 2023 administrative elections. In the first round he stands at 46.23% over the outgoing mayor Francesco Rucco, still at 44.06%; in the ballot he will then be the winner with 50.54% of the votes.

He then became mayor of Vicenza at the age of 33, making him the youngest mayor in the history of the city.

Political offices
Preceded by Francesco Rucco	Mayor of Vicenza since 2023	Incumbent
