= Gianni Mongelli =

Italian politician

Mayor of Foggia
- In office 23 June 2009 – 11 June 2014
- Preceded by: Orazio Ciliberti
- Succeeded by: Franco Landella

Personal details
- Born: Giovanni Battista Mongelli; 8 June 1957 (age 69) Foggia, Italy
- Party: Democratic Party
- Education: University of Pisa
- Profession: engineer, entrepreneur

Giovanni Battista Mongelli (born 8 June 1957) is an Italian politician of the Democratic Party who served as mayor of Foggia from June 2009 to June 2014.

== See also ==
- 2009 Italian local elections
- List of mayors of Foggia

Political offices
Preceded by Orazio Ciliberti	Mayor of Foggia; 2009–2014	Succeeded by Franco Landella
