= List of mayors of Foggia =

Mayor of Foggia
- Sindaco di Foggia

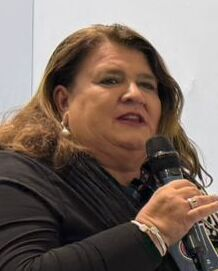
- Incumbent; Maria Aida Episcopo since 30 October 2023
- Appointer: Popular election
- Term length: 5 years, renewable once
- Formation: 1860
- Website: Official website

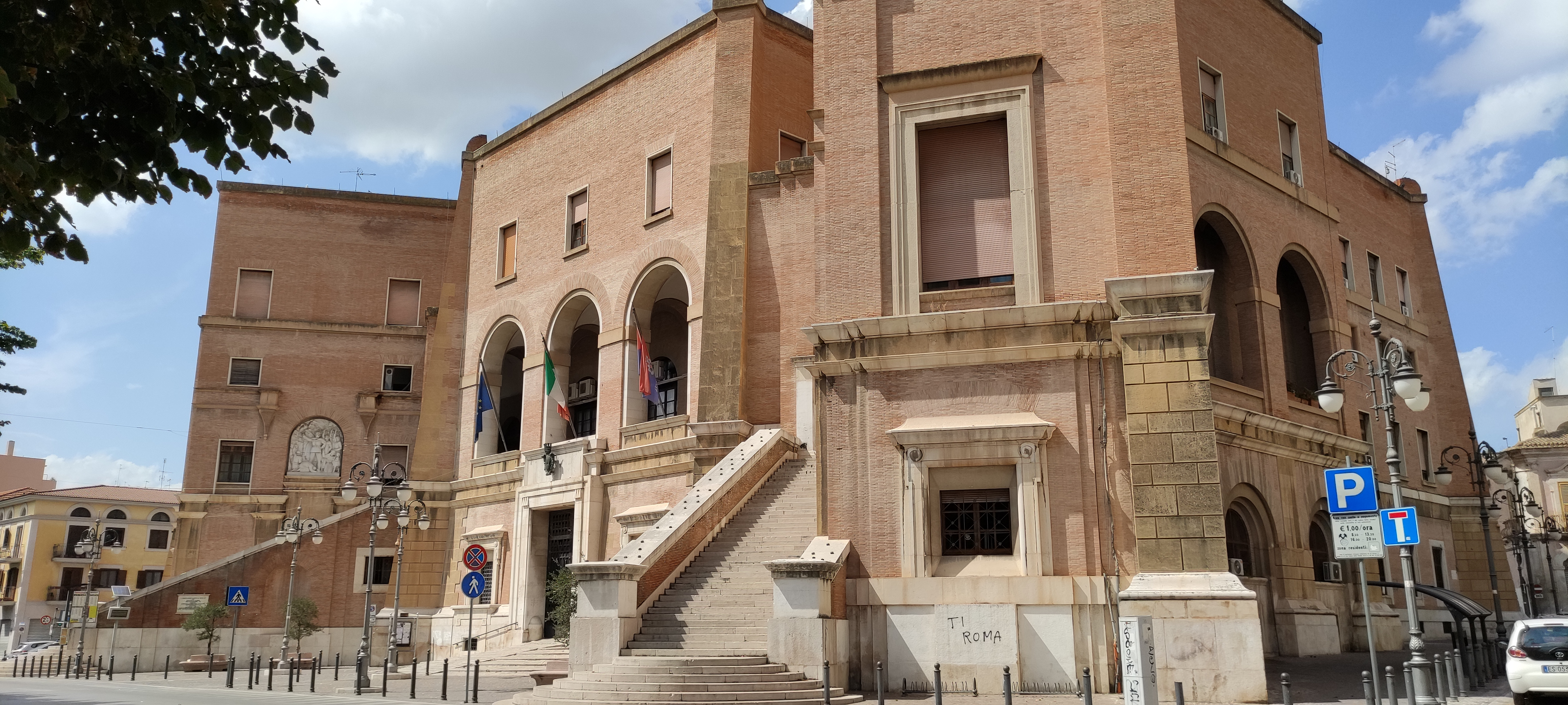
Foggia's Town Hall.

The mayor of Foggia is an elected politician who, along with the Foggia City Council, is accountable for the strategic government of Foggia in Apulia, Italy.

The current mayor is Maria Aida Episcopo, a centre-left independent, who took office on 30 October 2023, becoming the first woman to hold the office.

== Overview ==
According to the Italian Constitution, the mayor of Foggia is member of the City Council.

The mayor is elected by the population of Foggia, who also elect the members of the City Council, controlling the mayor's policy guidelines and is able to enforce his resignation by a motion of no confidence. The mayor is entitled to appoint and release the members of his government.

Since 1995 the mayor is elected directly by Foggia's electorate: in all mayoral elections in Italy in cities with a population higher than 15,000 the voters express a direct choice for the mayor or an indirect choice voting for the party of the candidate's coalition. If no candidate receives at least 50% of votes, the top two candidates go to a second round after two weeks. The election of the City Council is based on a direct choice for the candidate with a preference vote: the candidate with the majority of the preferences is elected. The number of the seats for each party is determined proportionally.

== Italian Republic (since 1946) ==
=== City Council election (1946-1995) ===
From 1946 to 1995, the Mayor of Foggia was elected by the City Council.

	Mayor	Term start	Term end	Party
Special Prefectural Commissioner tenure (1946–1947)
1	Giuseppe Imperiale	1947	1948	PCI
2	Paolo Telesforo	1948	1950	UQ
3	Vito Ciampoli	1950	1952	UQ
4	Giuseppe Pepe	1952	1956	MSI
5	Girolamo Caggianelli	1956	1957	Ind
6	Vittorio de Miro d'Aieta	1957	1961	DC
7	Carlo Forcella	1962	1966	DC
8	Vittorio Salvatori	1966	1972	DC
9	Pellegrino Graziani	1972	1981	DC
10	Giovanni Mongiello	1981	1983	DC
11	Enzo Petrino	1983	1988	DC
12	Carmine Tavano	1988	1990	DC
13	Domenico Verile	1990	1992	DC
14	Salvatore Chirolli	1992	1995	DC

=== Direct election (since 1995) ===
Since 1995, under provisions of new local administration law, the Mayor of Foggia is chosen by direct election, originally every four, then every five years.

	Mayor	Term start	Term end	Party	Coalition	Election
15	Paolo Agostinacchio	8 May 1995	14 June 1999	AN	FI • AN • CCD • PPI	1995
15	Paolo Agostinacchio	14 June 1999	28 June 2004	AN	FI • AN • CCD	1999
16	Orazio Ciliberti	28 June 2004	23 June 2009	DL; PD	DS • DL • SDI	2004
17	Gianni Mongelli	23 June 2009	11 June 2014	PD	PD • PSI	2009
18	Franco Landella	11 June 2014	11 June 2019	FI; Lega	FI • NCD • FdI • PPT	2014
18	Franco Landella	11 June 2019	25 May 2021 (Note: Resigned after being arrested with the charges of corruption and attempted extortion.)	FI; Lega	FI • Lega • FdI	2019
Special Commission tenure (25 May 2021 – 30 October 2023) (Note: Special Commission nominated after the municipal administration had been dissolved by the Government due to Mafia association.)
19	Maria Aida Episcopo	30 October 2023	Incumbent	Ind	PD • M5S • IV • A	2023
