= Enzo Bianco =

Italian politician

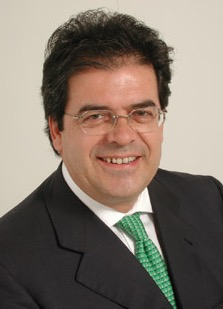

Minister of the Interior
- In office 22 December 1999 – 10 June 2001
- Prime Minister: Massimo D'Alema; Giuliano Amato
- Preceded by: Rosa Russo Jervolino
- Succeeded by: Claudio Scajola

Mayor of Catania
- In office 29 July 1988 – 1 December 1989
- Preceded by: Giuseppe Azzaro
- Succeeded by: Guido Ziccone
- In office 20 June 1993 – 22 January 2000
- Preceded by: Angelo Lo Presti
- Succeeded by: Umberto Scapagnini
- In office 15 June 2013 – 18 June 2018
- Preceded by: Raffaele Stancanelli
- Succeeded by: Salvo Pogliese

Member of the Chamber of Deputies
- In office 23 April 1992 – 20 June 1993
- In office 30 May 2001 – 28 April 2006

Member of the Senate
- In office 28 April 2006 – 15 March 2013

Personal details
- Born: Vincenzo Bianco; 24 February 1951 (age 75) Aidone, Italy
- Party: PRI (till 1993); AD (1993–1998); Dem (1998–2002); DL (2002–2007); PD (since 2007)
- Education: University of Catania
- Occupation: Lawyer

Enzo Bianco (born 24 February 1951) is an Italian politician, former mayor of Catania and former Minister of the Interior.

== Early life ==
Bianco was born on 24 February 1951 in Aidone, province of Enna, Italy.

== Career ==
Bianco has been a member of the Chamber of Deputies from 1992 to 1993 with the Italian Republican Party and from 2001 to 2006 with The Olive Tree. He has then been Senator from 2006 to 2013 with the Democratic Party.

Bianco has been Minister of interior from 1999 to 2001 in the D'Alema II Cabinet and in the Amato II Cabinet.

He has been for a short period Mayor of Catania from 1988 to 1989 and has been re-elected in 1993, becoming the first mayor elected directly by the citizens of Catania, and in 1997, leaving the office in order to assume the charge of Minister of interior. After failing to be re-elected mayor in 2005, he manages to be re-elected in 2013, holding the charge for 5 more years. At the 2018 communal elections, he is defeated by the Forza Italia candidate Salvo Pogliese.

Preceded by Rosa Russo Jervolino	Italian Minister of the Interior; 1999–2001	Succeeded by Claudio Scajola
