= Vincenzo Lanza =

Italian physician, politician and professor

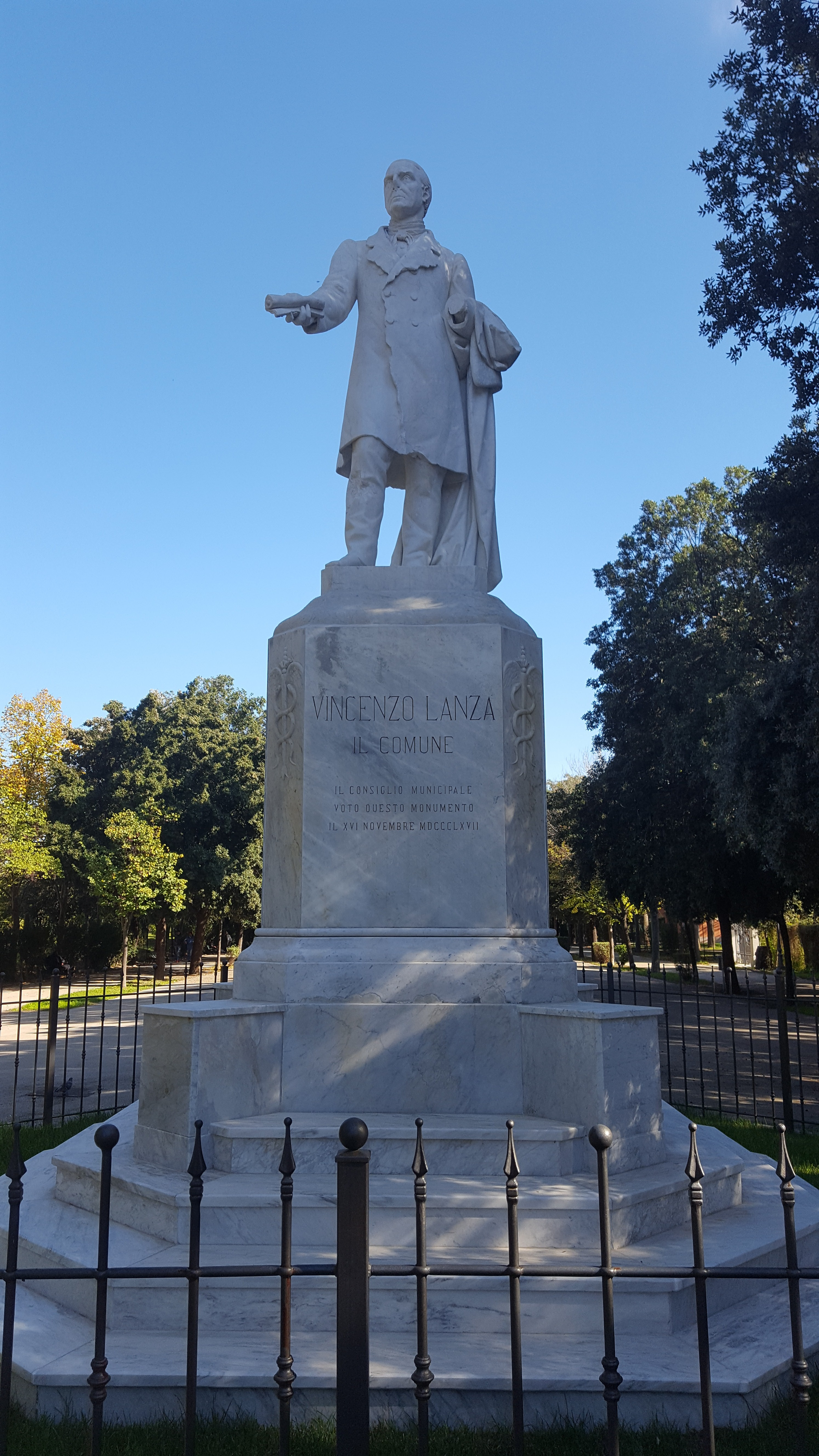
- Statue of Lanza in Foggia
- Born: 8 May 1784; Foggia, Kingdom of Sicily
- Died: 3 April 1860 (aged 75); Naples, Kingdom of the Two Sicilies
- Other name: Vincenzio
- Occupations: Physician, politician, professor

Vincenzo Lanza (8 May 1784 – 3 April 1860) was an Italian medical doctor, politician and professor.

== Biography ==
Vincenzo Lanza, or Vincenzio (as he preferred to be called) was born in Foggia from a humble couple coming from Roseto Valfortore working as service personnel in Mr Saggese's estates. He spent the first years of his life in the hinterland, attending the Seminary of Ariano until he was 16, when he moved to Naples to study medicine. Very important for him was the figure of Domenico Cotugno, holder of the Chair of Protomedicato of the Reign (a sort of general management of Public Healthcare), even if he was also student of many important physicians of the time at the Ospedale degli Incurabili.

On 20 October 1808 Lanza inaugurated a private clinic in the Ospedale della Pace, the first one in a Neapolitan hospital. In the same year he published a first book of Physiology, that can be considered as his graduation thesis. The following years were of great importance for his medical career, letting him reach prestigious positions in the scientific and educational environment. In 1811 Lanza received the licence to practice the medical profession and in 1817 his private clinic become a public one with the name of "Clinica dei nuovi sperimenti". In 1820 he wrote a letter to Giacomo Tommasini, about inflammation and fever (two important problems of the time), and five years later he published Gli elementi di medicina pratica analitica, dedicated to the same Tommasini.

In 1831 he became full professor and holder of the second Chair of Medicina Pratica at Regia Università di Napoli. Between 1836 and 1837 an epidemic of cholera broke out and many physicians left Naples, but Lanza stayed there with some others to study and try to contain this phenomenon. In 1841 Lanza published Nosoloigia Positiva, the first Italian book of Pathology written by a clinician for clinicians. In 1846 he became Dean of the Medicine Department of the University and in 1848 was elected member of the Parliament of the Province of Naples. But during the night of 14 May the revolution broke out: the Parliament was prorogued and Lanza, along with many other patriots, was exiled.

In the years of his exile he was in Rome, Capua, Genoa and Caserta until 1855, when he was able to return to Naples. In 1859 Lanza was called to the sickbed of Ferdinando II (come back seriously ill from a journey in Apulia) who died soon after. One year later, in 1860, Lanza died of apoplexy in his house in Via Toledo 413 in Naples.

== Works ==
- Lezioni di clinica medica (1809)
- Istituzioni di clinica medica (1811)
- Aforismi di clinica (1814)
- Giornale clinico del tifo Petecchiale, e Sperimenti sulla petecchiale corrente in Napoli (1817)
- Patologico Clinica – sulla natura dell’infiammazione e della febbre – (letter to G. Tommasini) (1820)
- Gli elementi di medicina pratica analitica (1825)
- Ragionamento sul retto uso dell'analisi e della critica nello studio della medicina (1832)
- Provvedimenti curativi nella colera (1836)
- Nosologia Positiva (1841/45)

== Bibliography ==
- Domenico Pace, Vincenzo Lanza e i suoi tempi [1784–1860] (excerpted from Studium – Rivista di scienza medica – anno XXI, n° 5), Napoli, 1931, pp. 24
- Alessandro Porro, “Vincenzo Lanza”, Dizionario Biografico degli Italiani, Treccani, 2004, vol. 63
