= Umberto Scapagnini =

Italian politician, former mayor of Catania

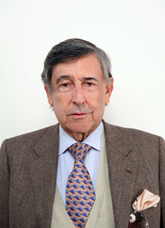

Mayor of Catania
- In office 18 April 2000 – 12 February 2008
- Preceded by: Enzo Bianco
- Succeeded by: Raffaele Stancanelli

Member of the Chamber of Deputies
- In office 29 April 2008 – 14 March 2013

Member of the European Parliament
- In office 19 July 1994 – 16 April 2000

Personal details
- Born: 16 October 1941 Naples, Italy
- Died: 2 April 2013 (aged 71) Rome, Italy
- Party: PSI (until 1994); Forza Italia (1994-2008); PdL (2008-2013)
- Occupation: Medic, academic, politician

Umberto Scapagnini (16 October 1941 – 2 April 2013) was an Italian politician, former mayor of Catania.

== Biography ==
=== Academic career ===
Scapagnini graduated in Medicine in 1965, and then taught Neuropharmacology in 1968 and Neuroendocrinology in 1972; from 1967 to 1973 he was a professor at the Heymans Institute of the University of Ghent, the YC Medical Center in San Francisco, and at MIT in Boston, and has been a consultant of NASA from 1969 to 1975.

In 1975 he became full professor at the University of Catania, making him the youngest Italian Professor of Medical Pharmacology. Scapagnini has later been the Dean of the Faculty of Medicine and Surgery of the University of Catania.

Scapagnini had been for years the personal physician of Silvio Berlusconi.

=== Political career ===
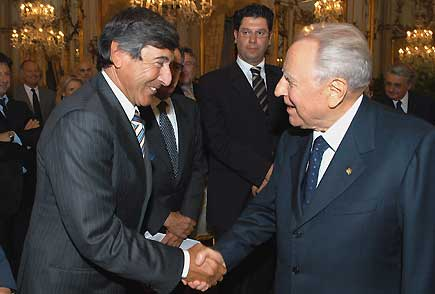
Mayor Scapagnini with former President of Italy Carlo Azeglio Ciampi in 2004.

In Catania he entered into politics becoming a municipal councilor with the Italian Socialist Party (PSI) in 1985, becoming deputy mayor and city planning councilor between 1986 and 1987. Scapagnini has later joined Silvio Berlusconi's Forza Italia and was elected at the European Parliament in 1994; from 1994 to 1999 he has been President of the Commission for Research, Technological Development and Energy of the European Parliament. After being re-elected at the European Parliament in 1999, in 2000 he was elected mayor of Catania and was re-elected for a second term in 2005, the year in which he won against the candidate of L'Unione Enzo Bianco, former mayor of the city.

In 2008, several areas of Catania, not only in the suburbs but also in the city center, remained many days without lights due to the non-fulfillment of payments to ENEL by the municipality. On 12 February 2008 he resigned as mayor and was elected Deputy in the lists of The People of Freedom in the Italian political elections of 2008.

=== Illness and death ===
On 16 April 2008, a few days after the election in parliament, following a car accident, he reported a thoracic trauma and is hospitalized in serious condition at the Forlanini Hospital in Rome. On 20 May 2009, the Corriere della Sera website reported the news that Scapagnini has been hospitalized on a confidential prognosis "following severe metabolic decompensation".

In March 2011 he revealed that he had fought a tumor, relapsed after the 2008 car accident. On 2 April 2013, he died in Rome at the age of 71, after his health had deteriorated in the last few days, having been seized by a cerebral stroke and then by a heart attack.

== Judicial proceedings ==
On 2 May 2008, Scapagnini was sentenced to two years and six months of jail for irregularities in the granting of social security contributions by the municipality to employees for damage caused by ash from Mount Etna. In July 2008, along with 40 other municipal officials, he was investigated for a budget hole created during the eight years of his administration. Nevertheless, he obtained the office of Deputy, granting him immunity to the sentence issued on 2 May 2008.

In January 2010, he was adjudicated for ideological forgery in the investigation on the budget hole of hundreds of millions of euros, while in January 2011, Scapagnini was investigated for easy promotions and illegal career advancement of municipal employees in Catania.

In February 2011, he was sentenced to four months of jail for abuse of office for having hired his wife's driver, as a consultant to the Municipality of Catania, and in October 2011, he was sentenced to two years and nine months imprisonment for false accounting.
