= Enrico Trantino =

Italian politician, mayor of Catania since 2023

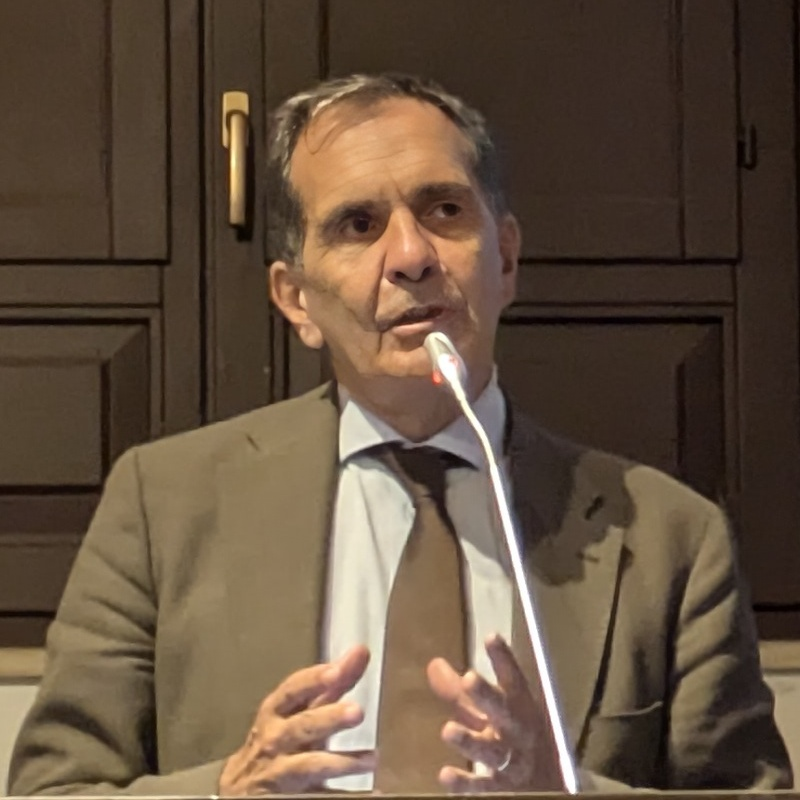

Mayor of Catania
- Incumbent
- Assumed office 5 June 2023
- Preceded by: Salvo Pogliese

Personal details
- Born: 15 October 1963 (age 62) Catania, Italy
- Party: MSI (till 1995); AN (1995-2009); PdL (2009-2013); The Right (2013-2014); FdI (since 2014)
- Education: University of Catania
- Occupation: Lawyer

Enrico Trantino (born 15 October 1963) is an Italian politician, Mayor of Catania since 2023.

== Biography ==
Son of deputy Vincenzo Trantino (1934–2024), he joined the Italian Social Movement until 1994, the year in which that party dissolved and Gianfranco Fini's National Alliance was formed.

Trantino began his political career as a very young man, at 14, attending the Youth Front. From 1984 to 1985 he was adviser to the Faculty of Law at the University of Catania.

From 1988 to 1992 he was municipal councilor of Catania, elected with the Italian Social Movement, reaching the position of vice president of the road and traffic commission and member of the culture commission. From 2004 to 2006 he assumed the role of "expert" of the Deputy Minister for Foreign Trade Adolfo Urso in the Berlusconi II and III cabinets.

Close to Nello Musumeci, he was a candidate in the 2014 European elections for Francesco Storace's The Right. Also in 2014, he joined the Diventerà Bellissima movement.

In 2019 the Mayor of Catania Salvo Pogliese appointed him Councilor for Urban Planning, Public Works, Decorum and Urban Furnishing, Relations with the university, an office he held until 2022.

On 5 April 2023, Brothers of Italy announced Trantino's candidacy for Mayor of Catania in view of the 2023 local elections. He is elected in the first round with 66.13% of the votes and took office on 5 June 2023.

Political offices
Preceded by Salvo Pogliese	Mayor of Catania since 2023	Incumbent
