= Franco Landella =

Italian politician (born 1966)

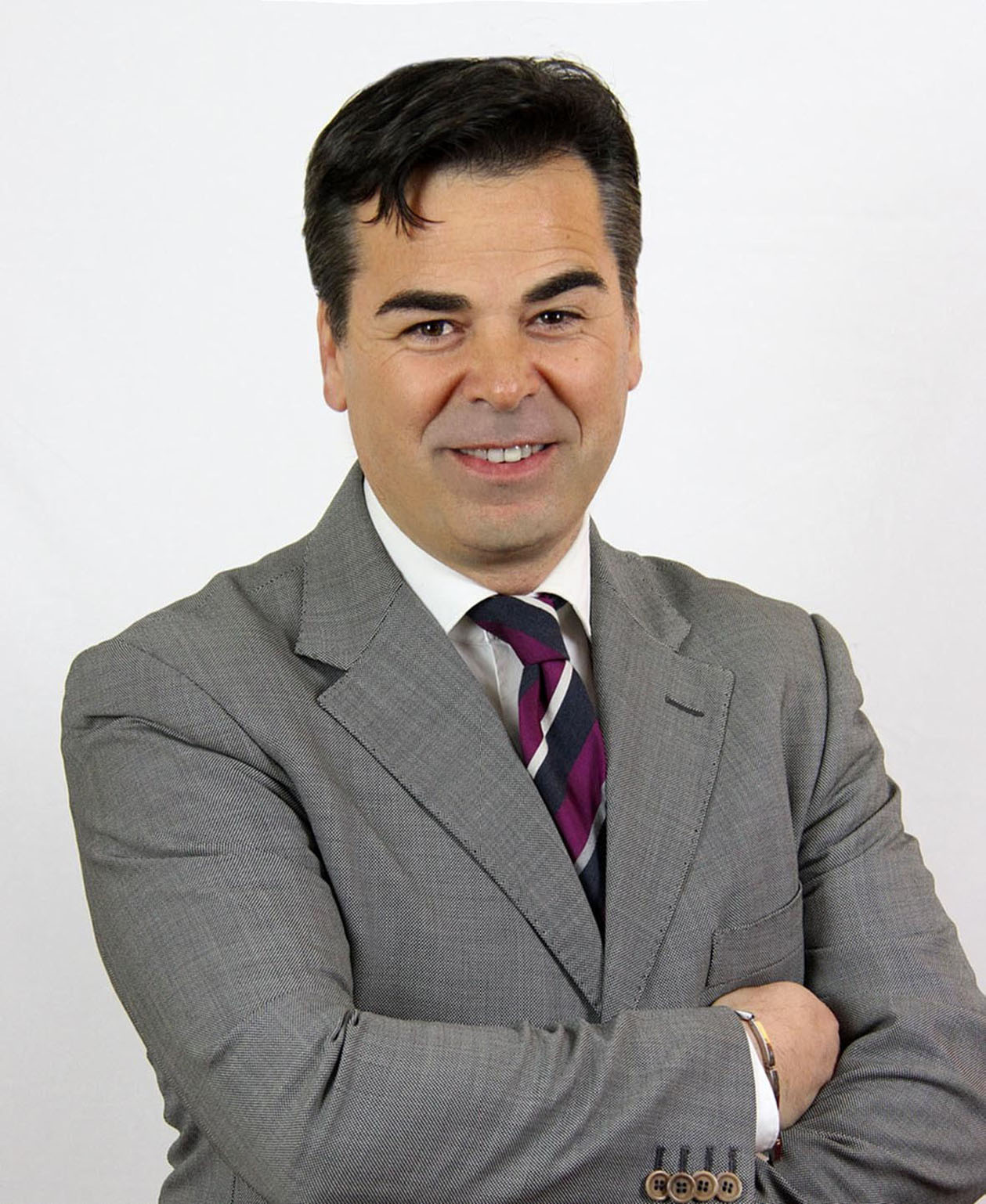

Mayor of Foggia
- In office 11 June 2014 – 25 May 2021
- Preceded by: Gianni Mongelli
- Succeeded by: Maria Aida Episcopo

Personal details
- Born: 1 May 1966 (age 60) Foggia, Italy
- Party: Forza Italia; Lega for Salvini Premier
- Education: University of International Studies of Rome
- Profession: administrator

Franco Landella (born 1 May 1966) is an Italian politician.

He is a member of the centre-right party Forza Italia. He was elected Mayor of Foggia on 8 June 2014 and took office on 11 June. He has been re-elected for a second term in 2019. In August 2020, he left Forza Italia and joined right-wing populist party Lega for Salvini Premier.

In May 2021, Landella is arrested with the charges of corruption and attempted extortion.

== Biography ==
The son of a CISL executive, Franco Landella became involved in politics at a young age, first with the Christian Democracy (Italy) and, starting in 1994, with Forza Italia (1994). A licensed surveyor, he was hired in 1999 by the Foggia Local Health Authority as a clerk. In 2002, he earned a bachelor’s degree in Political Science from the University of International Studies in Rome.

In the 2004 and 2009 local elections, he was the city council member who received the most votes. After an unsuccessful run for the regional council in 2010, he was appointed provincial secretary of The People of Freedom party two years later.

In the 2014 local elections, he was elected mayor as the head of a center-right coalition, winning 50.33% of the vote in the runoff. He took office as mayor on June 11. In the subsequent 2019 local elections, he was re-elected in the runoff with 53.28% of the vote. In August 2020, he officially announced his move to the Lega (political party), following a dispute with Forza Italia (2013) over the failure to nominate his sister-in-law, Michaela Di Donna, as a candidate in the regional elections the following September.

On May 4, 2021, following a meeting of the majority party, he resigned as mayor.

== See also ==
- 2014 Italian local elections
- 2019 Italian local elections
- List of mayors of Foggia

Political offices
Preceded by Gianni Mongelli	Mayor of Foggia; 2014–2021	Succeeded by Maria Aida Episcopo
