= List of mayors of Catania =

Mayor of Catania
- Sindaco di Catania

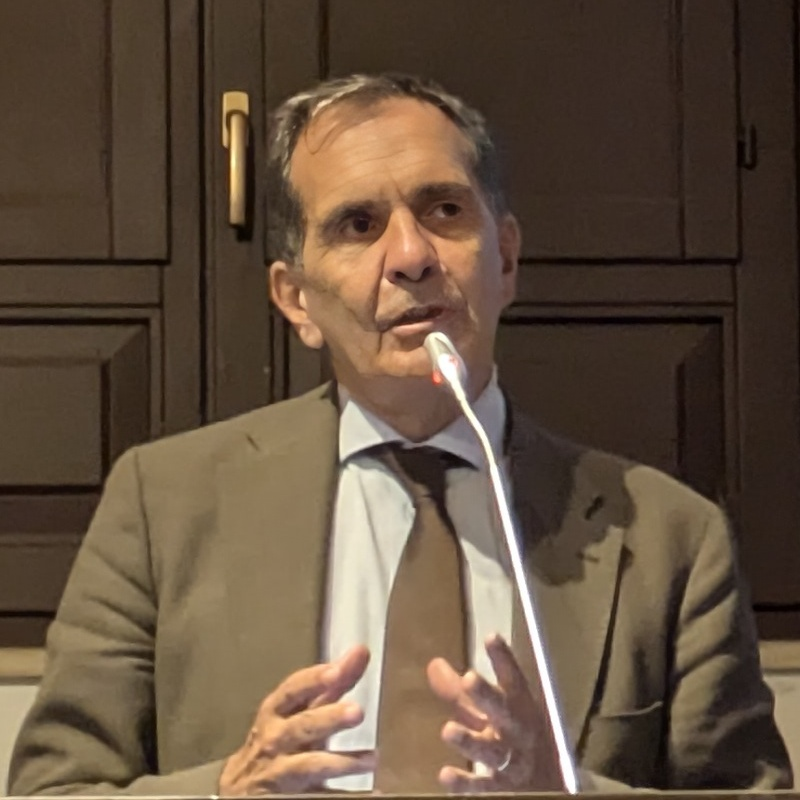
- Incumbent; Enrico Trantino (FdI) since 5 June 2023
- Residence: Palazzo degli Elefanti
- Appointer: Popular election
- Term length: 5 years, renewable once
- Formation: July 1861
- Website: Official website

The Mayor of Catania is an elected politician who, along with the Catania's City Council, is accountable for the strategic government of Catania in Sicily, Italy.

== Overview ==
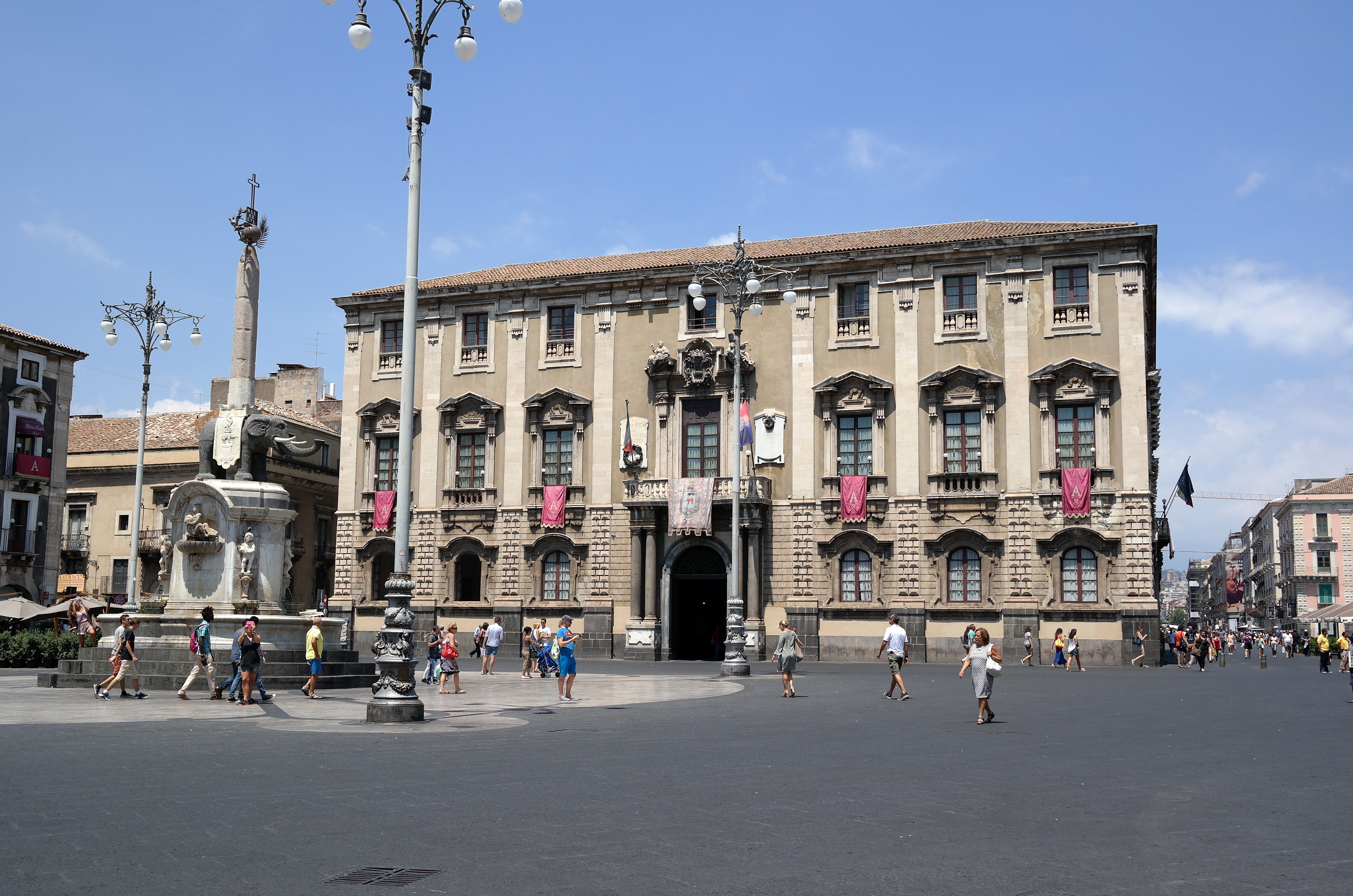
Palazzo degli Elefanti is Catania's City Hall

According to the Italian Constitution, the Mayor of Catania is member of the City Council.

The Mayor is elected by the population of Catania, who also elect the members of the City Council, controlling the Mayor's policy guidelines and is able to enforce his resignation by a motion of no confidence. The Mayor is entitled to appoint and release the members of his government.

Since 1993 the Mayor is elected directly by Catania's electorate: in all mayoral elections in Italy in cities with a population higher than 15,000 the voters express a direct choice for the mayor or an indirect choice voting for the party of the candidate's coalition. If no candidate receives at least 50% of votes, the top two candidates go to a second round after two weeks. The election of the City Council is based on a direct choice for the candidate with a preference vote: the candidate with the majority of the preferences is elected. The number of the seats for each party is determined proportionally.

== Italian Republic ==
=== City Council election (1947–1993) ===
From 1947 to 1993, the Mayor of Catania was elected by the City Council.

	Mayor	Term start	Term end	Party
1	Gregorio Guarnaccia	8 January 1947	31 March 1947	UQ
2	Nicolò Pittari	10 April 1947	8 July 1948	PDL
3	Giovanni Perni	9 July 1948	27 September 1950	PNM
4	Salvatore Gallo Poggi	27 September 1950	11 January 1952	MIS
5	Domenico Magrì	7 July 1952	14 November 1953	DC
6	Luigi La Ferlita	21 November 1953	7 November 1960	DC
7	Salvatore Papale	22 November 1960	14 December 1964	DC
8	Antonino Drago	14 December 1964	3 November 1967	DC
9	Giuseppe Gulli	3 November 1967	27 October 1969	DC
10	Salvatore Micale	27 October 1969	21 January 1972	DC
11	Ignazio Marcoccio	21 January 1972	3 August 1975	DC
(5)	Domenico Magrì	3 August 1975	11 April 1978	DC
12	Salvatore Coco	11 April 1978	1 January 1982	DC
13	Angelo Munzone	1 January 1982	10 February 1984	DC
14	Giuseppe Patanè	10 February 1984	3 August 1984	DC
15	Francesco Attaguile	3 August 1984	28 July 1985	DC
16	Antonino Mirone	28 July 1985	27 May 1986	DC
17	Giuseppe Sangiorgio	21 July 1986	29 September 1987	DC
18	Giuseppe Azzaro	16 December 1987	26 December 1987	DC
19	Enzo Bianco	29 July 1988	1 December 1989	PRI
20	Guido Ziccone	1 December 1989	2 January 1991	DC
(18)	Giuseppe Azzaro	7 February 1991	14 October 1991	DC
21	Luigi Giusso	18 November 1991	14 January 1992	DC
22	Angelo Lo Presti	14 January 1992	27 June 1992	PSDI
–	Alessandro Migliaccio (Special Commissioner)	27 June 1992	20 June 1993	

=== Direct election (since 1993) ===
Since 1993, under provisions of new local administration law, the Mayor of Catania is chosen by direct election, originally every four, and later every five years.

	Mayor	Term start	Term end	Party	Coalition	Election
(19)	Enzo Bianco (b. 1951)	20 June 1993	1 December 1997	AD; UD	AD and independents	1993
(19)	Enzo Bianco (b. 1951)	1 December 1997	22 January 2000 (Note: Resigned after being appointed Minister of the Interior. The deputy Mayor held the office till a new municipal election was called.)	AD; UD	The Olive Tree (PDS-PPI-PRC-UD)	1997
23	Umberto Scapagnini (1941–2013)	18 April 2000	16 May 2005	FI; PdL	House of Freedoms (FI-AN-CCD)	2000
23	Umberto Scapagnini (1941–2013)	16 May 2005	12 February 2008 (Note: Resigned in order to participate to the national general elections. The deputy Mayor held the office till a new municipal election was called.)	FI; PdL	House of Freedoms (FI-AN-UDC-MpA)	2005
24	Raffaele Stancanelli (b. 1950)	20 June 2008	15 June 2013	PdL	PdL • UDC • MpA	2008
(19)	Enzo Bianco (b. 1951)	15 June 2013	18 June 2018	PD	PD • SEL	2013
25	Salvo Pogliese (b. 1972)	18 June 2018	28 July 2022 (Note: Resigned in order to participate in the national general election.)	FI; FdI	FI • FdI • MpA • DB • UDC	2018
Special Prefectural Commissioner tenure (28 July 2022 – 5 June 2023)
26	Enrico Trantino (b. 1963)	5 June 2023	Incumbent	FdI	FdI • FI • LSP • NM • MpA	2023
