= Raffaele Stancanelli =

Italian politician (born 1950)

Raffaele Stancanelli MEP
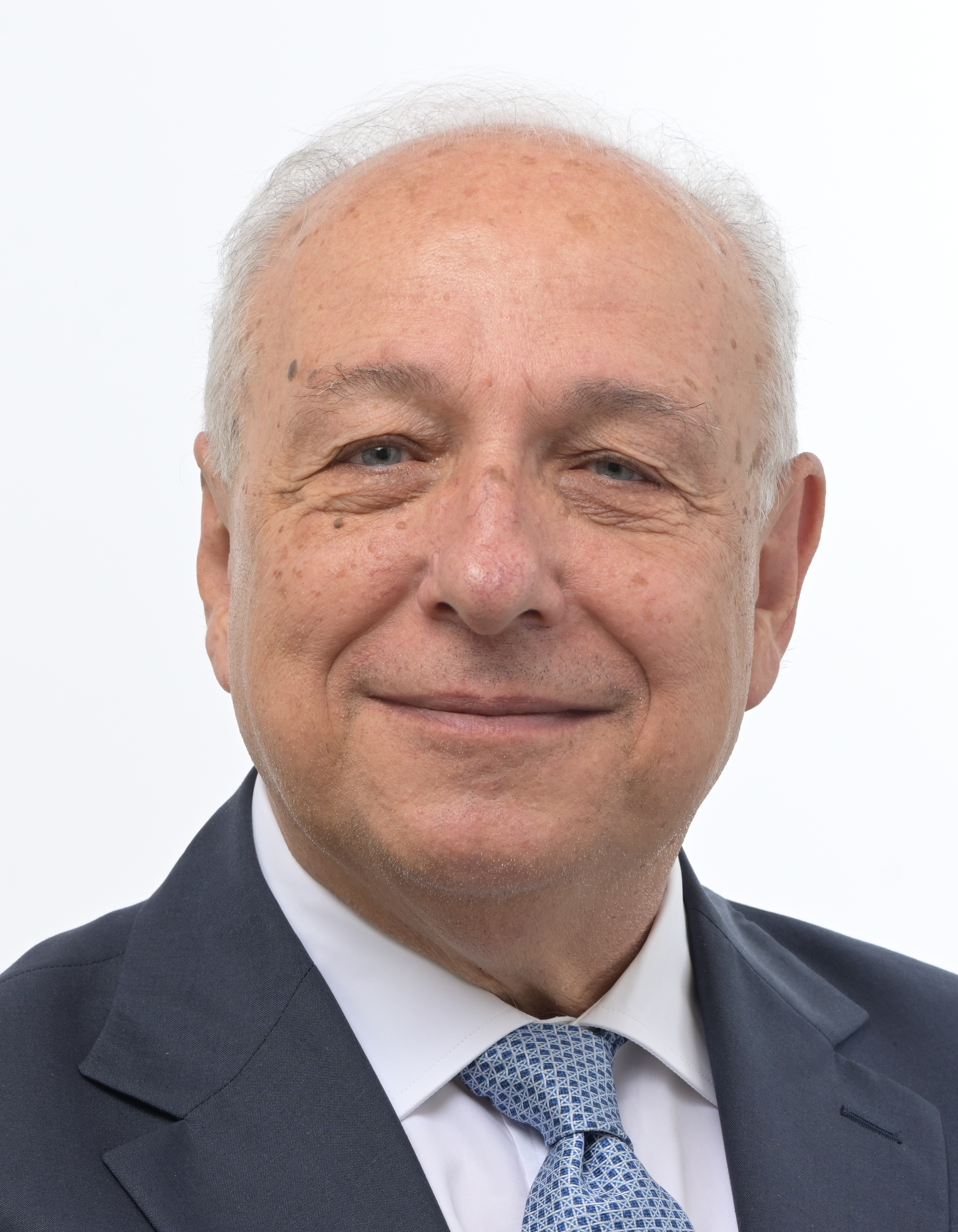

Member of the European Parliament
- Incumbent
- Assumed office 2 July 2019
- Constituency: Italian Islands

Member of the Senate of the Republic
- In office 23 March 2018 – 2 July 2019
- In office 29 April 2008 – 31 October 2011

Mayor of Catania
- In office 20 June 2008 – 15 June 2013
- Preceded by: Umberto Scapagnini
- Succeeded by: Enzo Bianco

Personal details
- Born: 30 June 1950 (age 76) Regalbuto, Italy
- Party: Lega (since 2024)
- Other political affiliations: MSI (until 1995); AN (1995–2009); PdL (2009–2013); FdI (2013–2014; 2019–2024); DB (2014–2019)
- Education: University of Catania
- Occupation: Lawyer, politician

Raffaele Stancanelli (born 30 June 1950) is an Italian politician.

== Biography ==
After graduating in Law at the University of Catania, Stancanelli began his political career with the Italian Social Movement, being municipal councilor in Regalbuto from 1978 to 1983 and in Catania from 1985 to 1992.

In 1996, he is elected for the first time at the Sicilian Regional Assembly with National Alliance; he is re-elected in 2001 and becomes Councilor for Labor, Vocational Training, Social Security and Emigration, while in 2004 he became Councilor for the Family, Social Policies and Local Autonomies, both times as member of the junta of governor Salvatore Cuffaro. Elected once again in 2006, he became vicar vice-president of the Sicilian Regional Assembly.

At the Italian political elections of 2008, Stancanelli is elected Senator with The People of Freedom. A few weeks later, he is elected at the first round mayor of Catania, defeating among the others the candidate of The Right and former president of the province of Catania Nello Musumeci. In October 2011, after the Constitutional Court had ruled the obligation to opt between the office of mayor and the office of senator, Stancanelli resigned from the Senate.

In 2013, he failed to be re-elected mayor and is defeated by the centre-left candidate and former mayor Enzo Bianco.

After a short experience in Brothers of Italy, Stancanelli became one of the founders of Nello Musumeci's movement Diventerà Bellissima.

At the Italian political elections of 2018, Stancanelli returned to the Senate and joined the parliamentary group of Brothers of Italy.

In 2019 he has been elected MEP on the Brothers of Italy list.
