= Angelo Munzone =

Italian politician (1933–2017)

Mayor of Catania
- In office 1982 – 10 February 1984
- Preceded by: Salvatore Coco
- Succeeded by: Giuseppe Patanè

Personal details
- Born: 12 August 1933 Catania, Italy
- Died: 6 October 2017 (aged 84)
- Party: Christian Democracy
- Profession: Politician

Angelo Munzone (12 August 1933 – 6 October 2017) was an Italian politician who served as Mayor of Catania between 1982 and 1984, being member of the Christian Democracy.

== Biography ==
Munzone born in Catania on 12 August 1933, where he died on 3 October 2017 at the age of 84. He was the mayor of Catania between 1982 and 10 February 1984. He was a leading exponent of the Christian Democracy in the Etna region.

He was director of the Provincial Tourism Company of Catania. He devoted much of his life to the passion for classical and lyric music initially as vice-president of the board of directors of the Teatro Massimo Bellini in Catania, later as Superintendent in 2006.

He was president of the Vincenzo Bellini musical institute in Catania.
