= Bombing of Foggia =

1943 event in World War II

The bombing of Foggia took place on several occasions in 1943, by Allied aircraft. The bombing caused 20,298 civilian victims during nine air raids.

The aim of the Allied Forces was to prevent the use of the transport network and airfields at Foggia. The transport network was an important focal point in the deployment of German and Italian troops used to counter the Allied attacks on Southern Italy and the invasion of Sicily in July (Operation Husky). It has been claimed that the raids were too extensive and caused excessively high levels of deaths and casualties amongst the civilian population (about a third of the population were killed. The air raids continued after an armistice had been signed between the Allies and Italy due to the concentration of German troops in Foggia.

The city of Foggia was awarded the Italian gold medal for civil valor on 22 November 1959 for having suffered 20,298 victims, and of the Italian gold medal for military valor on 25 April 2007.

== The bombing ==
Foggia was attacked on nine occasions. Thousands of homes in residential districts, the airport, the railway station, and numerous squares and streets were totally devastated.

A chronicle of the bombing of Foggia was written by Luca Cicolella in a book called "...e la morte venne dal cielo" ("...and death came from the sky"), published in 1973 and 1983, which also contained the Report made by the Monsignor Fortunato Maria Farina and sent to Pope Pius XII.

[22 July 1943] The station clock says 9.43. The sky suddenly darkens. Forty Flying Fortresses and more than fifty fighter planes descend upon Foggia. When the bell of the Town Hall tolls to give the alarm, the massacre has already begun. The first bombs fall on the station, smashing the buildings with extraordinary violence and closing the entrances to the underpasses from which heart-rending cries of pain can be heard. A train has arrived from Bari a few minutes before. Many travellers have been caught by surprise as they entered the underpasses. Others believe that they can shelter from the fury of the bombardment in the same underpasses. Instead they go to a certain death...

For a short period Foggia became a ghost town in which looters sought valuables worn by the casualties and burgled abandoned buildings.

... There are some who decide to exploit the tragedy. In the night the flying fortresses do not return. Instead the thieves arrive. They are "jackals" who pounce upon the dead, rummaging in their pockets and taking money, rings and gold chains. They enter the half-ruined houses, filling boxes with linen, and running off with furniture and jewellery. Every night they return to plunder the city. No one intervenes. People are afraid that they are armed.

Although an Armistice between Italy and Allied armed forces was declared on September 8, Allied forces continued bombing until September 15, ostensibly to prevent German troop movements, as the town had been occupied by German troops in the aftermath of the Armistice.

== Chronology of events ==
- 15 May 1943: Allied forces occupy Tunisia.
- 28,30 and 31 May: Destruction of the airport and railway station of Foggia. (462 victims)
- 21 June: Second air raid. (91 victims)
- 10 July: The first Allied landings on the island of Sicily.
- 15 July: Air raid on the railway station. (1,293 civilian victims)
- 22 July: Another air raid on the railway station, with strafing of the whole area. (7,643 victims)
- 25 July: The fall and arrest of Mussolini.
- 16 August: Air raid on the outskirts of Foggia.
- 19 August: Carpet bombing of the entire city. (9,581 victims)
- 24–25 August: Thousands of bombs launched over the city, also during the night, until the morning of the 25th. (971 victims)
- 8 September: Badoglio announces the armistice between Italy and the Allies (signed at Cassibile on September 3).
- 9 September: A smaller air raid, despite the recently signed armistice. (21 civilian victims)
- 17–18 September: The last air raid on the city of Foggia. (179 victims)

== Sources ==
- M. Gismondi, Foggia: la tragica estate; Taranto: la notte più lunga. Dedalo, Bari, 1968.
- L. Cicolella, ... e la morte venne dal cielo. Foggia 1943. Cronistoria di cento giorni di guerra, Bastogi, Foggia, 1973, 1983.
- P. Odorico Tempesta, Foggia nelle ore della sua tragedia, Edizione del Rosone, Foggia, 1995.
- A. Guerrieri, La città spezzata: Foggia, quei giorni del '43, Edipuglia, Bari, 1996.
- A. De Santis, L'immane tragedia dell'estate del 1943 a Foggia, Tipografia Valerio De Santis, Foggia, 2007.
