= Achille Variati =

Italian politician (born 1953)

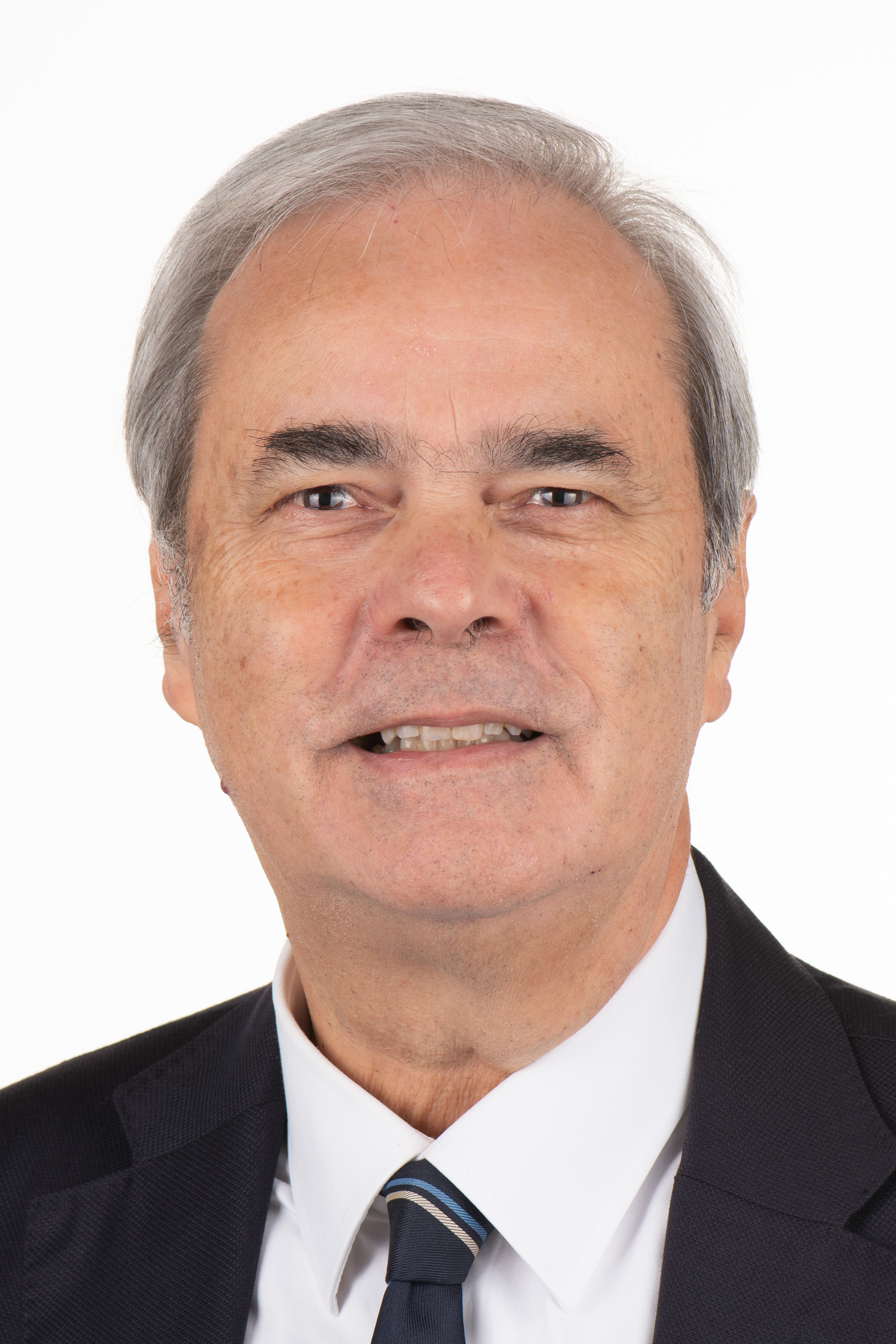

Member of the European Parliament
- In office 2 November 2022 – 15 July 2024
- Constituency: North-East Italy

Undersecretary of State for the Ministry of the Interior
- In office 16 September 2019 – 13 February 2021
- Prime Minister: Giuseppe Conte
- Minister: Luciana Lamorgese

President of the Province of Vicenza
- In office 12 October 2014 – 13 June 2018
- Preceded by: Attilio Schneck
- Succeeded by: Francesco Rucco

Mayor of Vicenza
- In office 29 April 2008 – 13 June 2018
- Preceded by: Enrico Hüllweck
- Succeeded by: Francesco Rucco
- In office 12 July 1990 – 8 May 1995
- Preceded by: Antonio Corazzin
- Succeeded by: Marino Quaresimin

Member of the Regional Council of Veneto
- In office 5 June 1995 – 6 May 2008

Personal details
- Born: 19 January 1953 (age 73) Vicenza, Italy
- Party: DC (till 1994); PPI (1994–2002); DL (2002–2007); PD (since 2007)
- Education: University of Padua
- Occupation: Politician

Achille Variati (born 19 January 1953) is an Italian politician who served as a member of the European Parliament from 2022 to 2024.

== Political career ==
A long-time member of Christian Democracy, he was elected to the municipal council of Vicenza in 1980 and then re-elected in 1985 and 1990, when he became mayor of Vicenza. After the disbandment of Christian Democracy, he joined the Italian People's Party and later The Daisy and the Democratic Party.

Elected to the Regional Council of Veneto in 1995, 2000 and 2005, he was president of the group of the Democratic Party since the beginning of 2007, almost eight months before the party was founded. He was elected again mayor of Vicenza in 2008 and re-elected in 2013. In 2014, he became president of the Province of Vicenza.

In 2019, Variati was appointed undersecretary of State for the Ministry of the Interior.
