= Salvo Pogliese =

Italian politician

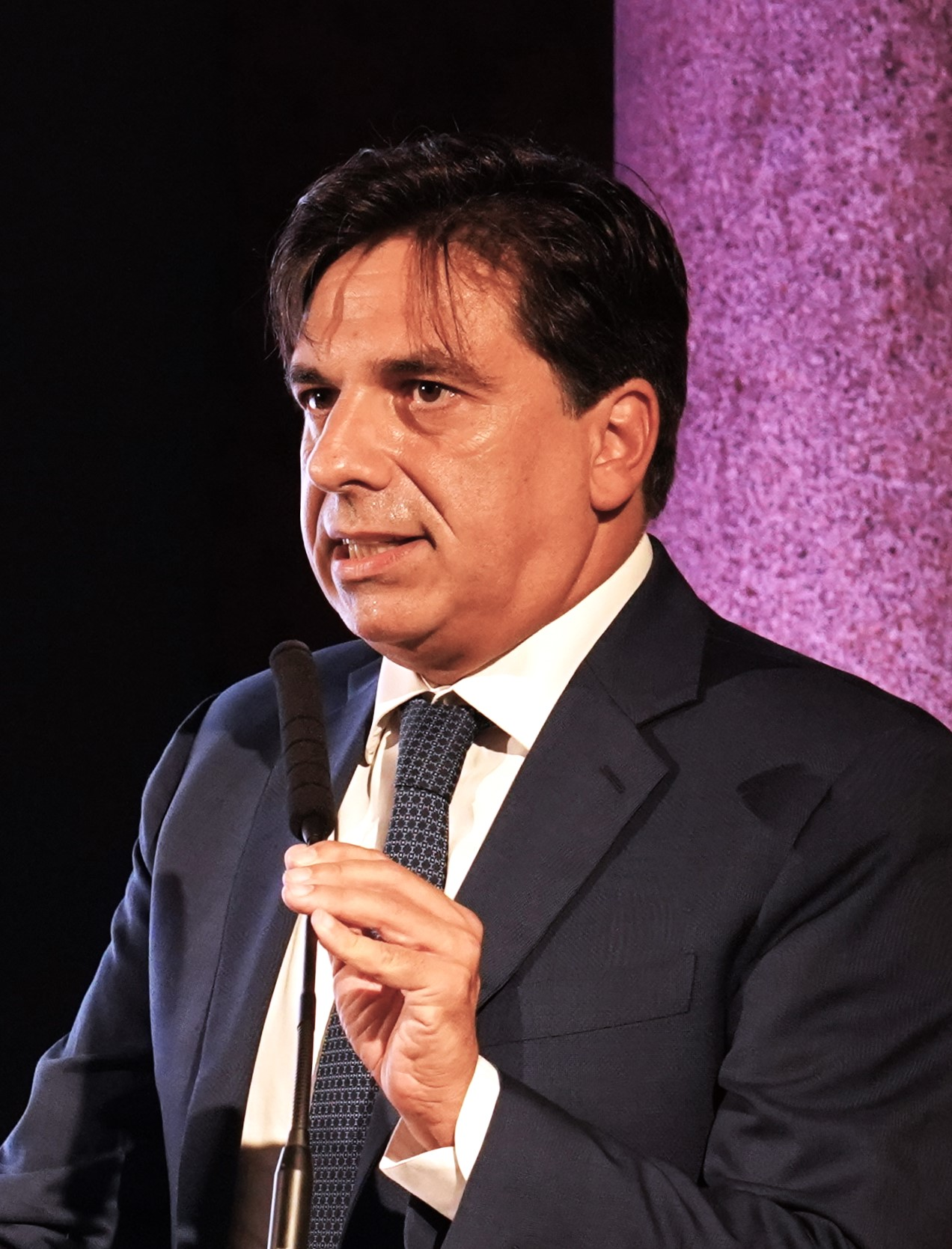

Mayor of Catania
- In office 18 June 2018 – 28 July 2022
- Preceded by: Enzo Bianco
- Succeeded by: Enrico Trantino

Member of the Senate
- Incumbent
- Assumed office 13 October 2022
- Constituency: Sicily

Member of the European Parliament
- In office 1 July 2014 – 14 July 2018
- Constituency: Italian Islands

Personal details
- Born: 3 March 1972 (age 54) Catania, Italy
- Party: MSI (till 1995); AN (1995-2009); PdL (2009-2013); FI (2013-2019); FdI (since 2019)
- Education: University of Catania
- Occupation: Chartered accountant, politician

Salvatore Domenico Antonio Pogliese (born 3 March 1972) is an Italian politician, Mayor of Catania from 2018 to 2022.

== Biography ==
Pogliese graduated in Economy at the University of Catania and has been a chartered accountant. He entered in politics when he was very young, beginning his political career in the Youth Front, the youth organization of the Italian Social Movement, of which Pogliese has been provincial secretary in Catania. With the end of the MSI and the birth of National Alliance, Pogliese became the regional secretary of Youth Action, the youth organization of Gianfranco Fini's party in Sicily.

In 1997 he was elected to the City Council of Catania and in 2003 he was elected to the Provincial Council, working as assessor in the junta led by Raffaele Lombardo. He is elected to the Sicilian Regional Assembly in the regional elections of 2006 with National Alliance and in the regional elections of 2008 with The People of Freedom. Re-elected in the regional elections of 2012, he became vice-president of the Sicilian Regional Assembly.

During the 2014 European election, Pogliese in elected to the European Parliament with Forza Italia.

In February 2018, Pogliese announced his intention to run for Mayor of Catania, receiving support from his own party and the whole centre-right coalition and from President of Sicily Nello Musumeci. In June 2018, Pogliese is elected Mayor, defeating his incumbent predecessor Enzo Bianco.
