= Francesco Rucco =

Italian politician and lawyer

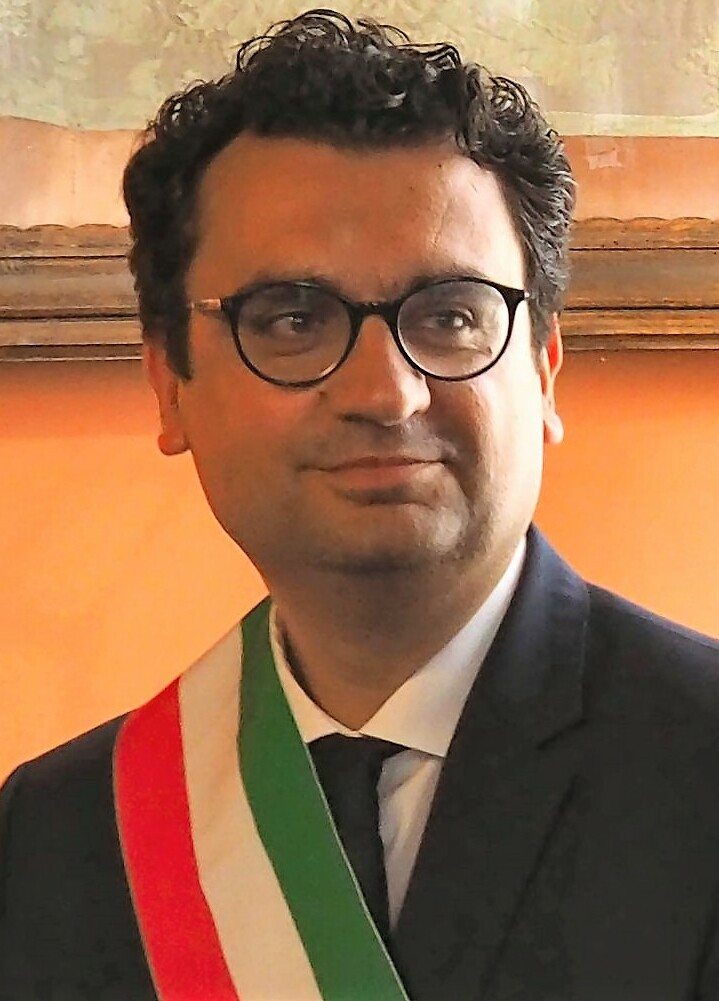

Member of the Regional Council of Veneto
- Incumbent
- Assumed office 5 December 2025
- Constituency: Vicenza

President of the Province of Vicenza
- In office 29 October 2018 – 29 January 2023
- Preceded by: Achille Variati
- Succeeded by: Andrea Nardin

Mayor of Vicenza
- In office 13 June 2018 – 29 May 2023
- Preceded by: Achille Variati
- Succeeded by: Giacomo Possamai

Personal details
- Born: 28 June 1974 (age 52) Lecce, Apulia, Italy
- Party: Independent politician Brothers of Italy
- Spouse: Ilaria (m. 2005)
- Children: 2
- Education: University of Parma
- Occupation: lawyer

Francesco Rucco (born 28 June 1974) is an Italian politician and lawyer.

He has served as Mayor of Vicenza from 2018 to 2023. He was also elected president of the Province of Vicenza since 2018. He was first city councilor and then group leader of the National Alliance until his confluence with the People of Freedom. He elected to the city council for the first time in 2003. He carried out his professional practice in a law firm in Vicenza from 1999 to 2001. He was president of district 4 Postumia, the area of Vicenza between 2000 and 2003.

In the 2025 Venetian regional election, Rucco was elected to the Regional Council of Veneto in the Vicenza constituency as a candidate of Brothers of Italy, receiving 9,356 preference votes.

== Biography ==
Francesco Rucco was born in Lecce, Italy on 1974. He is married to Ilaria and has two daughters. He studied in University of Parma.

Political offices
Preceded by Achille Variati	Mayor of Vicenza; 2018-2023	Succeeded by Giacomo Possamai
Preceded by Achille Variati	President of the Province of Vicenza; 2018-2023	Succeeded by Andrea Nardin
