= Giustino Fortunato University =

Coordinates: 41.1202°N 14.7991°E

- Università degli Studi Giustino Fortunato
- Type: Private
- Established: 2006
- Location: Benevento, Italy
- Campus: Online
- Website: unifortunato.eu

The Giustino Fortunato University (Italian: Università degli Studi Giustino Fortunato), often simply abbreviated as "Unifortunato", is a private for-profit online university founded in 2006 in Benevento, Italy.

== History ==
The university was named after Giustino Fortunato, who was a famous Italian historian. The university was established on 13 April 2006.

== Academics ==
Giustino Fortunato University provides online distance learning courses to Italians. The degrees conferred are accredited by the Italian Ministry of Education. Classes are offered online, while exams are taken at designated places.

The university offers 3-year bachelor's, 2-year master's, and 5-year single cycle master's degrees. To be admitted in the Bachelor degree programme, prospective students are required at least to have a high school diploma. Credits from previous degrees can be validated in order to shorten the time to degree.

During 2016/2017, the university has approximately 218 students and employs 54 staff lecturers and professors.

=== Rectors ===
- Aldo Loiodice
- Nicola Di Prisco
- Augusto Fantozzi
- Angelo Scala
- Giuseppe Acocella

== See also ==
- List of Italian universities
- Benevento
- Distance education
