= List of mayors of Vicenza =

Mayor of Vicenza
- Sindaco di Vicenza

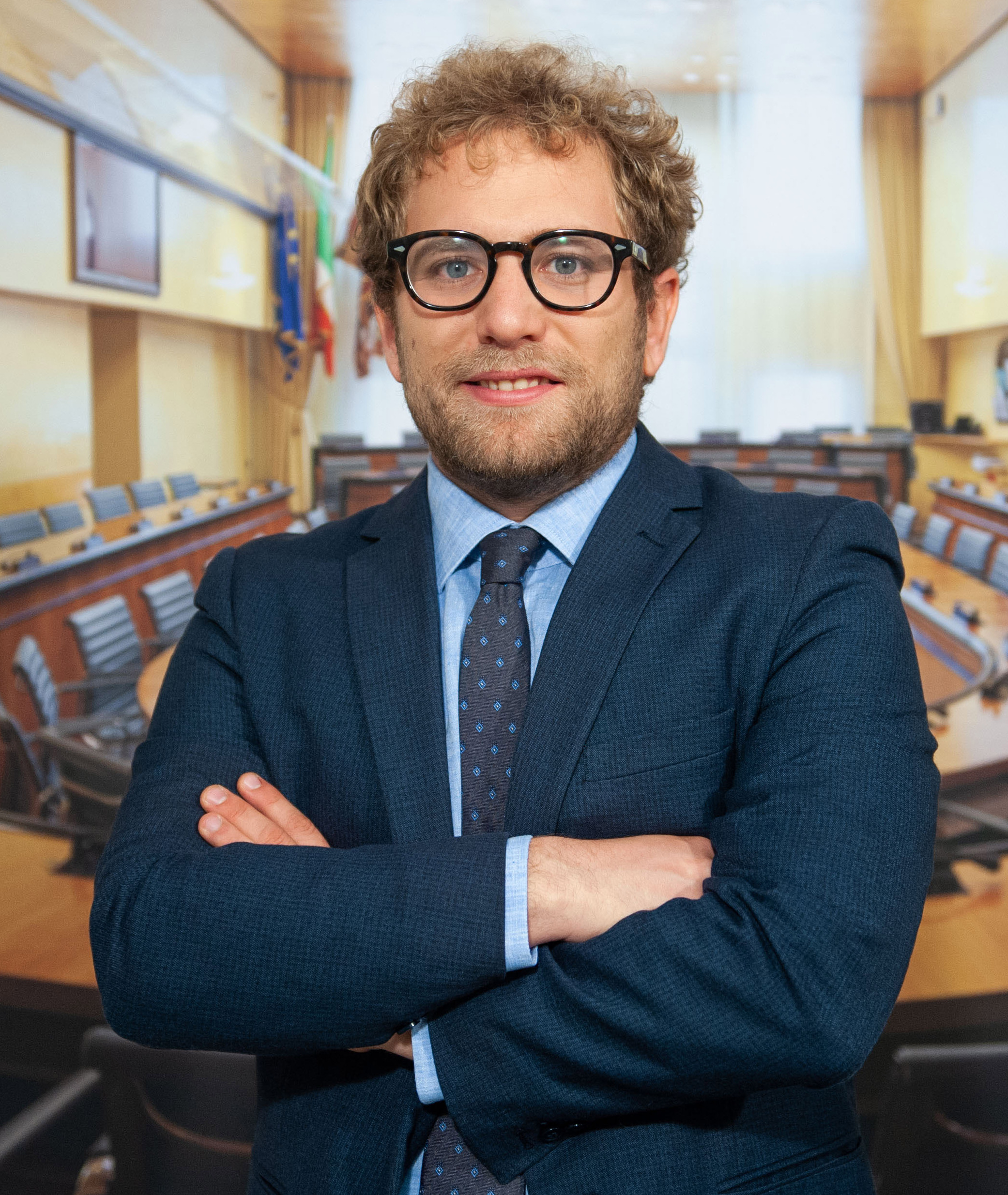
- Incumbent; Giacomo Possamai (PD) since 30 May 2023
- Appointer: Popular election
- Term length: 5 years, renewable once
- Formation: 1866
- Website: Official website

The mayor of Vicenza is an elected politician who, along with the Vicenza's city council, is accountable for the strategic government of Vicenza in Veneto, Italy.

The current mayor is Giacomo Possamai, a member of the Democratic Party, who took office on 30 May 2023.

== Overview ==
According to the Italian Constitution, the mayor of Vicenza is member of the city council.

The mayor is elected by the population of Vicenza, who also elects the members of the city council, controlling the mayor's policy guidelines and is able to enforce his resignation by a motion of no confidence. The mayor is entitled to appoint and release the members of his government.

Since 1995 the mayor is elected directly by Vicenza's electorate: in all mayoral elections in Italy in cities with a population higher than 15,000 the voters express a direct choice for the mayor or an indirect choice voting for the party of the candidate's coalition. If no candidate receives at least 50% of votes, the top two candidates go to a second round after two weeks. The election of the City Council is based on a direct choice for the candidate with a preference vote: the candidate with the majority of the preferences is elected. The number of the seats for each party is determined proportionally.

== Republic of Italy (since 1946) ==
=== City Council election (1946–1995) ===
From 1946 to 1995, the Mayor of Vicenza was elected by the City's Council.

	Mayor	Term start	Term end	Party
1	Luigi Faccio	1946	1948	PSI
2	Giuseppe Zampieri	1948	1958	DC
3	Antonio Dal Sasso	1958	1962	DC
4	Giorgio Sala	1962	1975	DC
5	Giovanni Chiesa	1975	1981	DC
6	Antonio Corazzin	1981	1990	DC
7	Achille Variati	1990	1995	DC

=== Direct election (since 1995) ===
Since 1995, under provisions of new local administration law, the Mayor of Vicenza is chosen by direct election, originally every four and since 1998 every five years.

	Mayor	Term start	Term end	Party	Coalition	Election
8	Marino Quaresmin	8 May 1995	25 June 1998 (Note: Resigned.)	PPI	PDS • PPI • FdV • PdD	1995
Special Prefectural Commissioner tenure (25 June 1998 – 14 December 1998)
9	Enrico Hüllweck	14 December 1998	10 June 2003	FI	FI • AN • CCD	1998
9	Enrico Hüllweck	10 June 2003	13 February 2008 (Note: Resigned in order to participate in the national election.)	FI	FI • AN • UDC	2003
Special Prefectural Commissioner tenure (13 February 2008 – 29 April 2008)
(7)	Achille Variati	29 April 2008	27 May 2013	PD	PD	2008
(7)	Achille Variati	27 May 2013	13 June 2018	PD	PD	2013
10	Francesco Rucco	13 June 2018	30 May 2023	Ind	Lega • FI	2018
11	Giacomo Possamai	30 May 2023	Incumbent	PD	PD • AVS	2023
