= Vincenzo Trantino =

Italian politician (1934–2024)

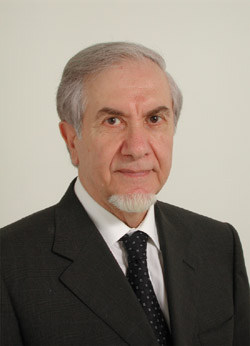
- Trantino in 2001

Member of the Chamber of Deputies of Italy for Sicily 2
- In office 25 May 1972 – 27 April 2006

Personal details
- Born: 20 September 1934 Licodia Eubea, Italy
- Died: 5 December 2024 (aged 90) Catania, Italy
- Party: PNM (1952–1959); PDIUM (1959–1972); MSI–DN (1972–1995); AN (1995–2009)
- Occupation: Lawyer

Vincenzo "Enzo" Trantino (20 September 1934 – 5 December 2024) was an Italian lawyer and politician. A member of the Italian Social Movement and the National Alliance, he served in the Chamber of Deputies from 1972 to 2006.

Trantino died in Catania on 5 December 2024, at the age of 90.
