= Foggia =

Foggia Fògge (Neapolitan)
- Comune
- Comune di Foggia
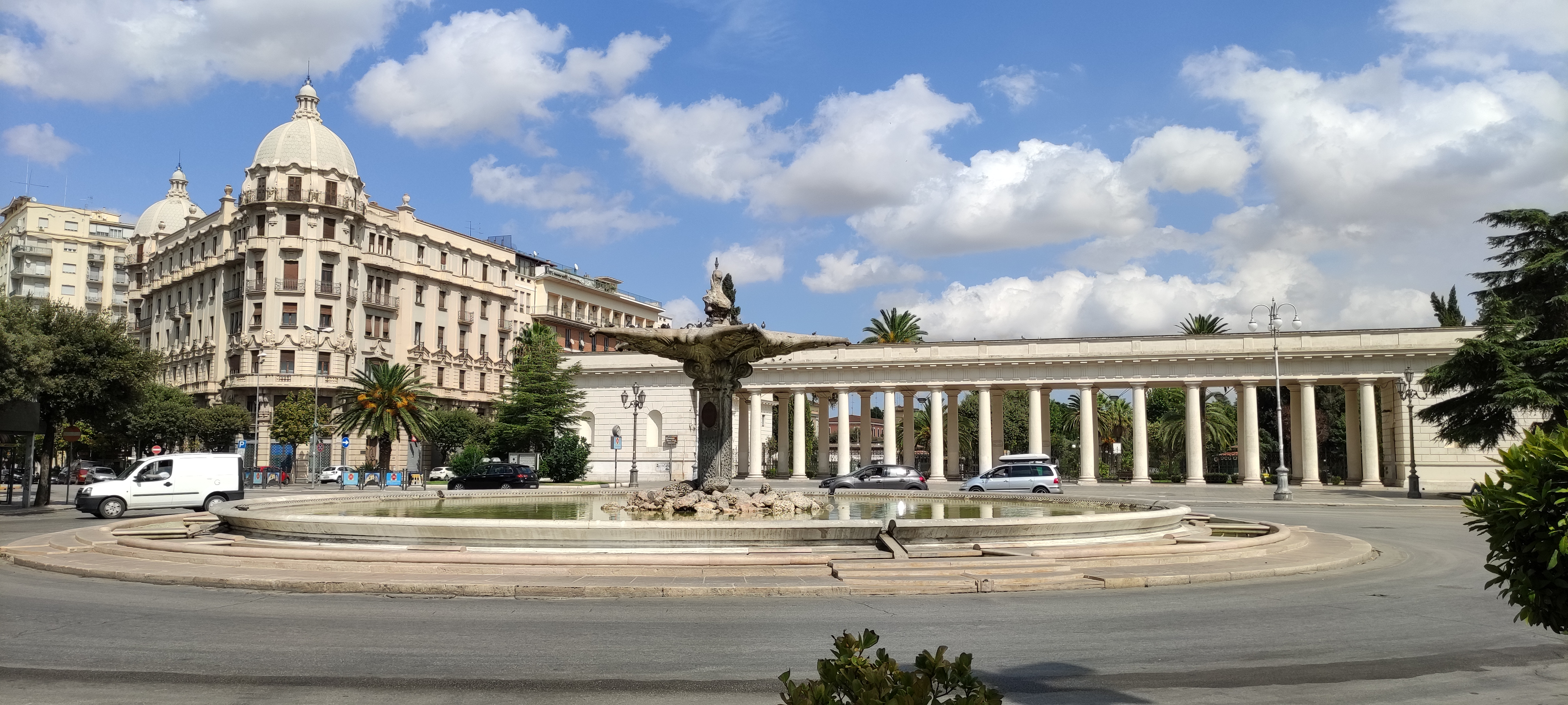
- Piazza Cavour in Foggia

- Flag Coat of arms

- Foggia within the Province of Foggia

- Location within Italy Location within Apulia
- Coordinates: 41°27′51″N 15°32′46″E
- Country: Italy
- Region: Apulia
- Province: Foggia (FG)
- Frazioni: Arpinova, Incoronata, Cervaro, Tavernola, Segezia, Duanera La Rocca

Government
  - Mayor: Maria Aida Episcopo

Area
  - Total: 509.26 km^{2} (196.63 sq mi)
- Elevation: 76 m (249 ft)

Population (2026)
  - Total: 145,078
  - Density: 284.88/km^{2} (737.84/sq mi)
- Demonym: Foggians
- Time zone: UTC+1 (CET)
  - Summer (DST): UTC+2 (CEST)
- Postal code: 71121 - 71122 - 71100
- Dialing code: 0881
- ISTAT code: 071024
- Patron saint: Madonna dei Sette Veli
- Saint day: March 22
- Website: www.comune.foggia.it

Foggia (UK: /ˈfɒdʒə/, US: /ˈfoʊdʒə/; Italian: [ˈfɔddʒa]; Foggiano: Fògge [ˈfɔddʒə]) is a city and comune (municipality) of the region of Apulia in southern Italy, capital of the province of Foggia. With a population of 145,078, it is the 28th-largest city in Italy.

Foggia is the main city of a plain called Tavoliere, also known as the "granary of Italy".

== History ==
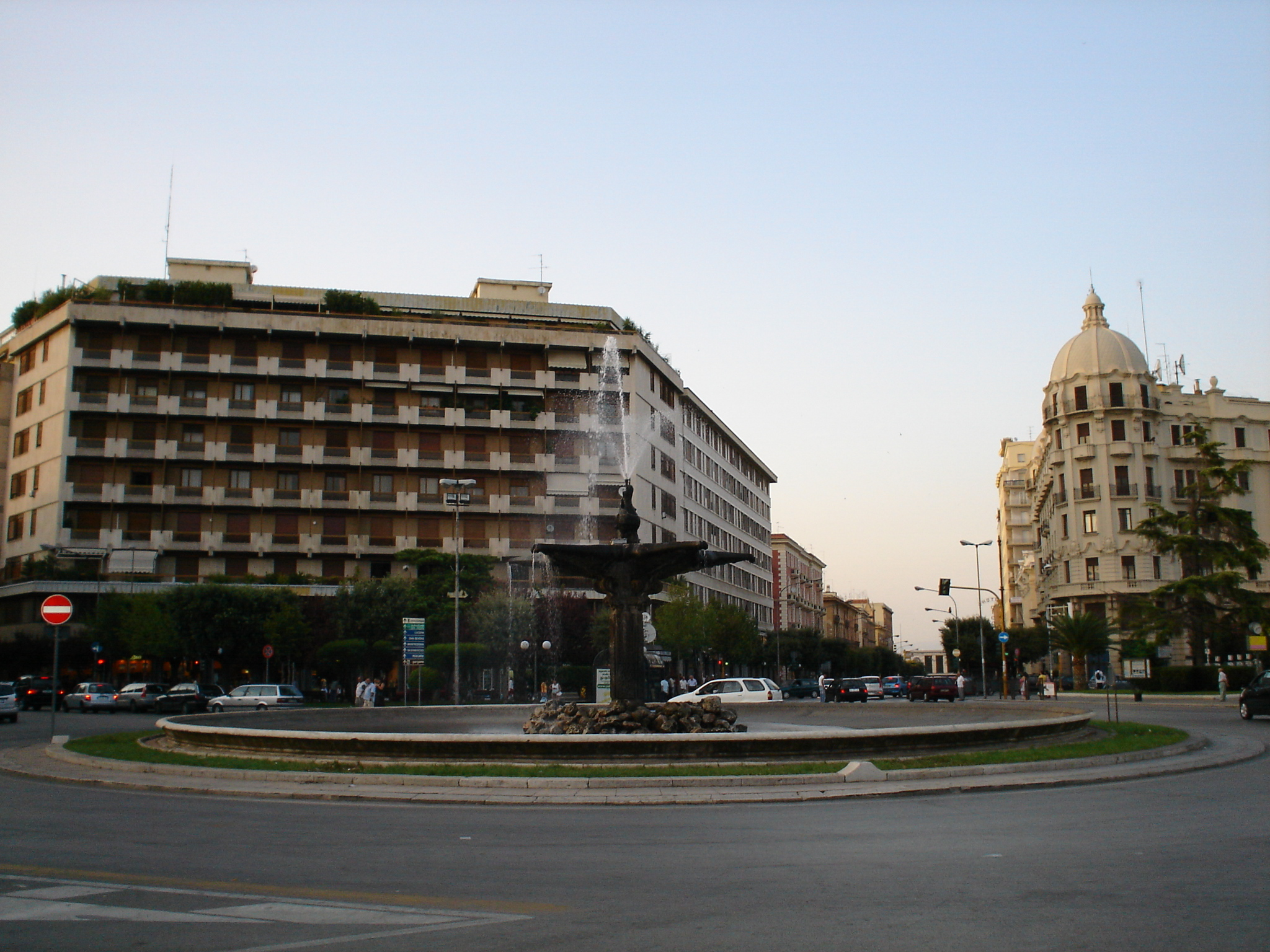
Piazza Cavour in Foggia

The name "Foggia" (originally Focis) probably derives from Latin "fovea", meaning "pit", referring to the pits where wheat was stored. The name's etymology remains uncertain however, as it could as well stem from "Phocaea", or possibly probably from the Medieval Greek word for "fire", which is "fotia", as according to legend the original settlers of the 11th century AD were peasants, allegedly after having [miraculously] discovered there a panel portraying the Madonna Nicopeia, on which three flames burnt.

The area had been settled since Neolithic times, and later on a Daunian settlement known as Arpi (in Greek Argos Hippium or Ἀργύριππα) existed nearby, close to present-day Arpinova. It was the largest city in ancient Daunia. An anachronistic legend reported by Pliny claimed that the Daunian city had been founded by Diomedes following the Trojan War.

However the first document attesting to the existence of the modern city dates to 1100, in the papal bull of Pope Paschal II which mentions the church of Sancta Maria de Focis. The area remained marshy and unhealthy until the late 11th century, when Robert Guiscard directed draining the wetland, boosting the economic and social growth of the city. The city was the seat of Henry, Count of Monte Sant'Angelo during the last twenty years of the 11th century. In the 12th century, William II of Sicily built a cathedral here and further enlarged the settlement.

Frederick II had a palace built in Foggia in 1223, in which he often sojourned. He elected the city "Regalis Sedes Inclita Imperialis", the preferred seat of the Empire, as we can now read on the entrance epigraph of the remains of the imperial palace. It was also seat of his court and a studium, including notable figures such as the mathematician and scholar Michael Scot, but little of it remains now. In 1447, King Alfonso V of Aragon built a Custom Palace to tax the local sheep farmers. This caused a decline of the local economy and the progressive ruin of the land, which again became marshy. In 1456, an earthquake struck Foggia, followed by others in 1534, 1627 and 1731, the last destroying one third of the city. The House of Bourbon promoted a certain economic growth by boosting the cereal agriculture of Capitanata and rebuilding much of the settlement.

In the 19th century, Foggia received a railway station and important public monuments. The citizens also took part in the riots which led to the annexation to Italy in 1861. By 1865, there was a definitive shift from the custom of sheep farming in favour of an agricultural economy.

The historical lack of water resources was solved with the construction of the Apulian aqueduct in 1924, when Foggia was already an important hub between northern and southern Italy.

During World War II, Foggia was heavily bombed by the Allied air forces for its important airfields and marshalling yards. On 22 July 1943, Foggia was bombed by over 100 B-17 Flying Fortresses. The city was devastated, and 7,643 residents were killed and over 700 injured. On 19 August 1943, Foggia's marshalling yards were bombed by 233 B-17s and B-24 Liberators – obliterating what was left of the city and killing another 9,581.

After the armistice of Cassibile on 8 September 1943, the town was briefly occupied by German troops in Operation Achse. There was some fighting there during the Allied invasion of Italy. In response to the Allied advance towards them, the German troops occupying Foggia abandoned the city on the 27th of September. By the 1st of October British troops had successfully occupied the city. In order to clear the Germans from the hills north and west of the Fogia plain and to reach the Vinchiaturo-Termoli road near the Biferno River, Britain's General Montgomery sent his British XIII Corps beyond Foggia on a two division drive, the 78th Division (sometimes known as "the Battle Axe division") moved on the coastal road to Termoli and the 1st Canadian Division struck inland through the mountains. British V Corps followed, protecting the west flank and the rear. The German 1st parachute division had largely withdrawn to the Biferno River near Termoli and dug in. Based out of Foggia, the British launched Operation Devon and succeeded in dislodging the Nazi German forces from Termoli. The Foggia airfields were subsequently used by Allied fighter and bomber formations until the end of the war, mainly from the American 15th but also from the 12th Air Force, the Royal Air Force and the South African Air Force.

In 1959 and 2006, Foggia received, respectively, the gold medal for Civil and Military value for its role in World War II.

Aulic Coat of Arms

== Geography ==
=== Climate ===
Foggia has a dry summer, Mediterranean climate (Köppen climate classification Csa), although it has some semi-arid climate (BSk), or steppe, influence, due to low precipitation (annually not much higher than the threshold for semi-arid climate). Winter days are generally between 11 and 13 °C but can be as cool as single figures. Low temperatures are generally above freezing, but frosts are experienced a handful of times a year. Summers are very hot, with temperatures in July and August often reaching 33–38 °C (91–100 °F). Temperatures exceed 40 °C (104 °F) a handful of times a decade. Extremes are −10.4 °C (13 °F) on 8 January 1985 and 47 °C (117 °F) - the highest temperature recorded in Italy and one of the highest recorded in Europe - on 25 June 2007.

Climate data for Foggia (Amendola Air Base) (1991–2020 normals, Extremes 1980–2020)
Month	Jan	Feb	Mar	Apr	May	Jun	Jul	Aug	Sep	Oct	Nov	Dec	Year
Record high °C (°F)	21.2 (70.2)	22.0 (71.6)	32.0 (89.6)	30.3 (86.5)	36.0 (96.8)	47.0 (116.6)	45.2 (113.4)	43.6 (110.5)	43.0 (109.4)	35.4 (95.7)	28.7 (83.7)	23.4 (74.1)	47.0 (116.6)
Mean daily maximum °C (°F)	12.4 (54.3)	13.2 (55.8)	16.1 (61.0)	19.5 (67.1)	25.0 (77.0)	30.0 (86.0)	32.7 (90.9)	33.0 (91.4)	27.5 (81.5)	22.6 (72.7)	17.1 (62.8)	13.1 (55.6)	21.8 (71.3)
Daily mean °C (°F)	7.9 (46.2)	8.2 (46.8)	10.7 (51.3)	13.5 (56.3)	18.5 (65.3)	23.2 (73.8)	25.7 (78.3)	26.1 (79.0)	21.5 (70.7)	17.3 (63.1)	12.6 (54.7)	8.8 (47.8)	16.2 (61.1)
Mean daily minimum °C (°F)	3.4 (38.1)	3.2 (37.8)	5.2 (41.4)	7.6 (45.7)	12.0 (53.6)	16.5 (61.7)	18.8 (65.8)	19.2 (66.6)	15.6 (60.1)	12.0 (53.6)	8.0 (46.4)	4.6 (40.3)	10.5 (50.9)
Record low °C (°F)	−10.4 (13.3)	−6.0 (21.2)	−5.0 (23.0)	−4.0 (24.8)	0.3 (32.5)	2.8 (37.0)	6.0 (42.8)	10.0 (50.0)	6.4 (43.5)	0.0 (32.0)	−2.8 (27.0)	−5.0 (23.0)	−10.4 (13.3)
Average precipitation mm (inches)	44.6 (1.76)	39.4 (1.55)	41.7 (1.64)	39.0 (1.54)	31.5 (1.24)	42.5 (1.67)	21.7 (0.85)	39.8 (1.57)	43.2 (1.70)	50.4 (1.98)	49.0 (1.93)	69.3 (2.73)	512.0 (20.16)
Average precipitation days (≥ 0.1 mm)	8.4	8.1	8.5	5.9	7.7	4.4	3.1	2.9	7.1	6.8	10.1	9.7	82.7
Average snowy days	0.3	0.6	0.1	0	0	0	0	0	0	0	0.1	0.1	1.2
Average relative humidity (%)	82.1	77.7	75.5	73.4	67.7	61.7	58.1	61.1	69.7	76.2	81.6	82.7	72.3
Source 1: Istituto Superiore per la Protezione e la Ricerca Ambientale
Source 2: Il Meteo (precipitation and humidity 1981–2010), Meteomanz(precipitation and snow days and extremes 2011-2020)

== Demographics ==
Historical population
Year	Pop.	±%
1861	31,562	—
1871	36,837	+16.7%
1881	40,648	+10.3%
1901	53,134	+30.7%
1911	75,648	+42.4%
1921	66,772	−11.7%
1931	55,763	−16.5%
1936	62,340	+11.8%
1951	97,504	+56.4%
1961	118,608	+21.6%
1971	141,711	+19.5%
1981	156,467	+10.4%
1991	156,268	−0.1%
2001	155,203	−0.7%
2011	147,036	−5.3%
2021	146,803	−0.2%
Source: ISTAT

As of 2026, the population is 145,078, of which 49.7% are males, and 50.3% are females. Minors make up 14.7% of the population, and seniors make up 24.8%.

=== Immigration ===
As of 2025, immigrants make up 7.8% of the population. The 5 largest foreign countries of birth are Morocco, Romania, Senegal, Mali, and The Gambia.

== Sights ==
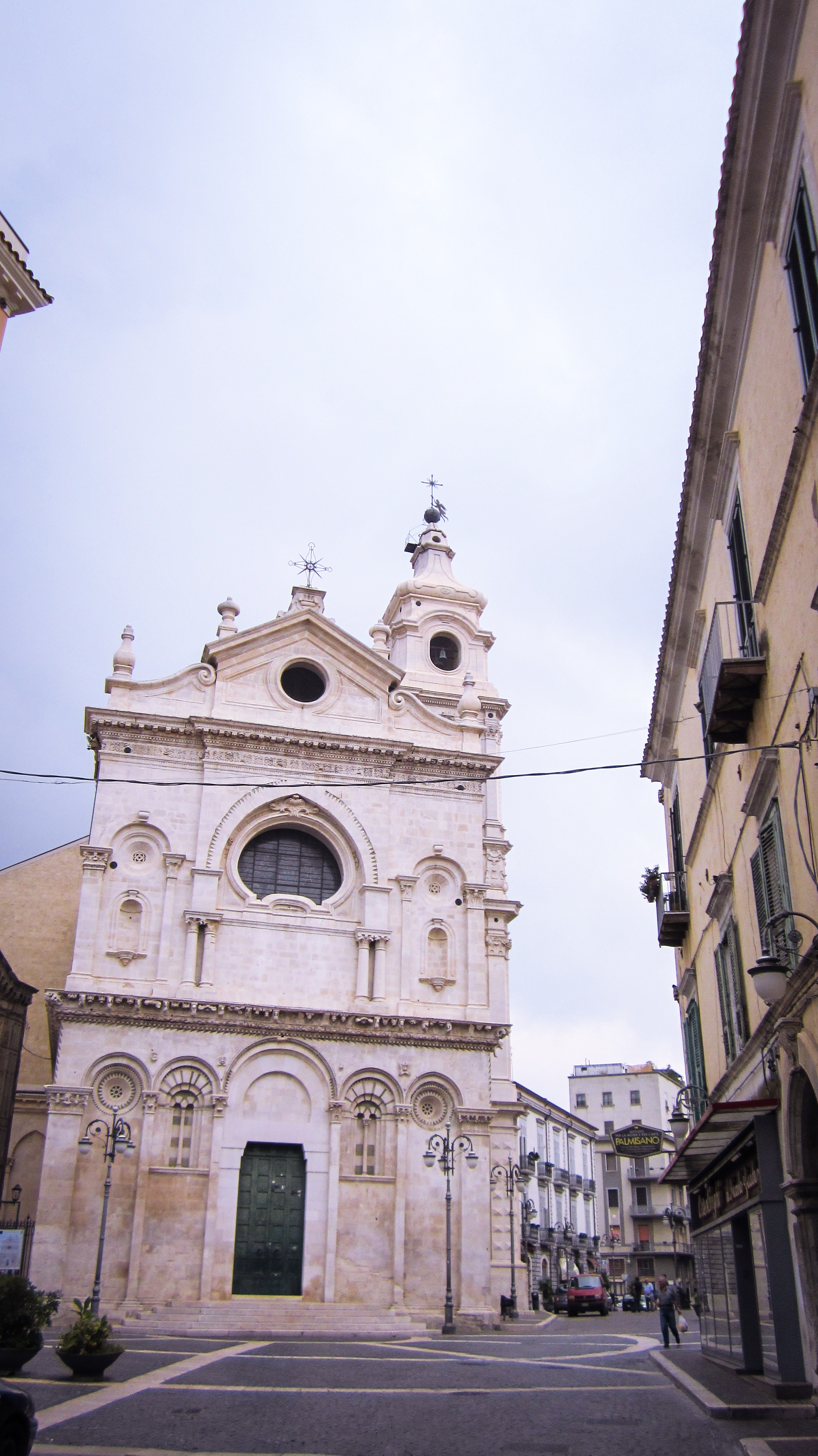
Foggia, Cathedral from via Arpi

- The cathedral of Santa Maria de Fovea, probably erected about 1179, which is directly linked with the patron saint "Madonna dei Sette Veli" (Madonna of the Seven Veils). This site has two levels of architectural style: the lower part is Romanesque, as with many Apulian churches; the upper part is a remarkable example of Baroque. The upper part was reconstructed after a 1731 earthquake that destroyed a great part of the historical centre.
- Palazzo Dogana, the historical seat of the sheep custom. In July 2013 this Palace was elected by UNESCO as "Messenger Monument of the Culture of Peace" for its role in the cultural exchanges during centuries.
- Chiesa delle Croci ("Church of the Crosses").
- I Tre Archi ("The Three Arches").
- Arco di Federico II ("Arch of Frederick II").
- Archaeological park of Passo di Corvo.

== Economy ==
It is a communication and industrial center and the main wheat market of Southern Italy. Foggia is famous for its watermelons and tomatoes.

Although less important than once before, the agricultural sector remains the mainstay of Foggia's economy. This area is nicknamed the "granary of Italy". The few industries present are mostly devoted to food processing. Craftsmanship is also encouraged and developed.

== Transport ==
=== Rail ===
Foggia railway station, opened in 1864, forms part of the Adriatic Railway (Ancona–Lecce), and is the terminus of the Naples–Foggia railway. It is also a junction for several other, secondary lines, namely the Foggia–Manfredonia, Lucera–Foggia and Foggia–Potenza railways, making Foggia the most important railway junction of southern Italy and the third one of whole Italy.

=== Air ===
Foggia is served by Gino Lisa Airport, which offers direct flights operated with helicopters to Tremiti Islands and Vieste. The nearest major airport is Bari Karol Wojtyła Airport, located 126 km (78 mi) south east of Foggia.

== Sport ==
Foggia is home to the football club Calcio Foggia 1920 S.S.D., which plays in Serie C, the third football division in Italy, for the 2020-2021 season. The club earned popular recognition in the early 1990s because of its sparking interpretation of total football led by coach Zdeněk Zeman, which led to promotion to and a brief period in Serie A. The club plays at Stadio Pino Zaccheria, named after Pino Zaccheria, a local pioneer of basketball killed during World War II.

In February 2019, Foggia hosted the European Cadet and Junior Fencing Championships.

== In popular culture ==
The TV character Archie Bunker on All in the Family spent time in Foggia when he was in the Army Air Corps. The series creator Norman Lear was stationed in Foggia during WWII.

== Notable people ==
- Renzo Arbore (born 1937), television showman and musician
- Alex Baroni (1966–2002), singer
- Adriano Celentano (born 1938), singer, actor and television showman
- Donato Coco (born 1956), automobile designer, chief designer at Ferrari
- Mauro De Mauro (1921–1970), journalist assassinated by mafia
- Pietro Giannone (1676–1748), philosopher
- Umberto Giordano (1867–1948), composer, whose memory is honored in the town square
- Vincenzo Lanza (1784-1860), doctor and politician
- Vladimir Luxuria (born 1965), transgender Italian politician
- Mario Mauro (born 1961), minister of defence
- Andrea Pazienza (1956–1988), cartoonist
- Pio e Amedeo (born 1983), actors and producers
- Michele Placido (born 1946), actor and director
- Nicola Sacco (1891–1927), anarchist, convicted of murder, executed in Massachusetts, US
- Luigi Samele (born 1987), Olympic sabre fencer
- Vincent Simone (born 1979), dancer
- Tony Slydini (1900–1991), magician
- Nicola Zingarelli (1860–1935), philologist

== International relations ==
=== Twin towns – sister cities ===
Foggia is twinned with:

- Göppingen, Germany, since 1971
- Wałbrzych, Poland, since 1998
- Pescasseroli, Italy, since 2005
- Forlì, Italy, since 2009
- L'Aquila, Italy, since 2009
- Quimper, France, since 2011
- Erzurum, Turkey, since 1987

== See also ==
- Archdiocese of Foggia–Bovino
- Capitanata
- Gargano
- Tavoliere delle Puglie
- Province of Foggia
- Bombing of Foggia in 1943 (World War II)
- Foggia Airfield Complex (World War II)
