= Timeline of Ancona =

The following is a timeline of the history of the city of Ancona in the Marche region of Italy.

== Prior to 18th century ==
- 390 BCE – Greek colony founded by Syracusans (approximate date).
- 268 BCE – Romans in power.
- 1st century BCE – Ancona becomes a municipium.
- 107 CE – Mole constructed in the Port of Ancona.
- 115 CE – Arch of Trajan erected.
- 4th–5th century CE – Roman Catholic diocese of Ancona established.
- 5th century – Basilica of San Lorenzo built.^{(it)}
- 539 – Ancona besieged by Gothic forces.
- 551 – Ancona besieged by Gothic forces under Totila.
- 728 – Duke of Spoleto in power.
- 774 – Ancona "given to the pope by Charlemagne."
- 848 – Ancona sacked by Saracen forces.
- 1128 – Ancona Cathedral consecrated.
- 1167 – Naval blockade of Ancona by the Venetians.
- 1173 – Ancona besieged by Venetian forces.
- 1183 – Ancona attacked by Venetian forces.
- 1208 – Azzo VI of Este in power in the Marches.
- 1210 – Santa Maria della Piazza church remodelled.
- 1221 – Porta della Farina (gate) built.
- 1229 – Ancona attacked by Venetian forces.
- 1257 – Ancona attacked by Venetian forces.
- 1258 – Manfred, King of Sicily in power in the Marches.
- 1274 – Ancona attacked by Venetian forces.
- 1323 – San Francesco alle Scale church founded.
- 1357 – Marches-related Constitutiones marchiae anconitanae (law) issued.
- 1400 – Public clock installed (approximate date).
- 1428 – Ancona attacked by Venetian forces.
- 1442 – Loggia dei Mercanti construction begins.
- 1493 – Palazzo degli Anziani (Ancona) construction begins.
- 1532 – Ancona becomes part of the Papal States.
- 1543 – Cittadella di Ancona (fort) built.
- 1605 – Chiesa del Gesù (Ancona) (church) construction begins.

== 18th–19th centuries ==
- 1732 – Free port status granted.
- 1737 – Arco Clementino erected.
- 1738
  - Lazzaretto of Ancona built.
  - Statue of Pope Clement XII erected in the Piazza Maggiore.
- 1749 – Biblioteca comunale Luciano Benincasa (library) established.
- 1789 – Porta Pia (Ancona) (gate) built.
- 1797
  - French forces take Ancona.
  - Anconine Republic established.
- 1799 – Austrians take Ancona.
- 1801 – French retake Ancona.
- 1827 – Teatro delle Muse (theatre) opens.
- 1843 – Cantiere navale di Ancona (shipyard) active.
- 1849 – Ancona besieged by Austrian forces.
- 1860
  - September: Sardinian forces take Ancona.
  - Corriere Adriatico newspaper begins publication.
  - Ancona Lighthouse on the Colle dei Cappuccini begins operating.
  - Circondario di Ancona (provincial district) established.
- 1861 – Ancona railway station opens; Bologna–Ancona railway begins operating.
- 1863 – Ancona–Pescara railway begins operating.
- 1866
  - Ancona–Orte railway begins operating.
  - Adriatic fleet headquarters relocated from Ancona to Venice.
- 1868 – Piazza Cavour (Ancona) constructed.
- 1876 – New Ancona Synagogue built.
- 1880 – "Southern quay" built in the port.
- 1881 – Ancona tram begins operating.
- 1897 – Population: 58,088.

== 20th century ==
- 1905 – Unione Sportiva Anconitana (football club) formed.
- 1911 – Population: 63,100.
- 1914 – June: Unrest during "Red Week".
- 1915 – Naval Bombardment of Ancona during World War I.
- 1918 – April: Attempted Austrian invasion of Ancona.
- 1920 – Military Bersaglieri revolt.
- 1929 – Ancona Airport built.
- 1930 – Monumento ai Caduti (Ancona) (monument) erected in Passetto (Ancona).
- 1943 – Bombing of Ancona (1943) during World War II.
- 1944 – Battle of Ancona.
- 1949 – Trolleybus system begins operating.
- 1961 – Teatro sperimentale Lirio Arena (theatre) built.
- 1969 – Università degli Studi di Ancona active.
- 1972 – An earthquake swarm included two destructive events that caused extensive damage. A magnitude 4.4 event (intensity VIII (Severe)) occurred on February 4 and a magnitude 4.9 event (intensity IX (Violent)) occurred on June 14.
- 1982 – December: Landslide.^{(it)}
- 1992 – Stadio del Conero (stadium) opens.

== 21st century ==
- 2003 – Marche Polytechnic University active.
- 2005 – Parco del Cardeto (park) opens.
- 2013
  - Local election held; Valeria Mancinelli becomes mayor.
  - Population: 100,343.
- 2015 – May: Marche regional election, 2015 held.

== See also ==
- History of Ancona
- List of mayors of Ancona
- List of bishops of Ancona
- History of the Jews in Ancona
- History of the province of Ancona
- History of le Marche (region)

Other cities in the macroregion of Central Italy:^{(it)}

- Timeline of Arezzo, Tuscany region
- Timeline of Florence, Tuscany
- Timeline of Grosseto, Tuscany
- Timeline of Livorno, Tuscany
- Timeline of Lucca, Tuscany
- Timeline of Perugia, Umbria region
- Timeline of Pisa, Tuscany
- Timeline of Pistoia, Tuscany
- Timeline of Prato, Tuscany
- Timeline of Rome, Lazio region
- Timeline of Siena, Tuscany

== Bibliography ==
=== in English ===
- William Smith, ed. (1872) [1854]. "Ancona". Dictionary of Greek and Roman Geography. London: John Murray. hdl:2027/hvd.ah5cuq.
- "Ancona". Chambers's Encyclopaedia. London. 1901. hdl:2027/njp.32101065312868.
- Victor Castiglione (1901), "Ancona", Jewish Encyclopedia, vol. 1, New York, hdl:2027/mdp.49015002282318
- "Ancona", Central Italy and Rome: Handbook for Travellers (15th ed.), Leipzig: Karl Baedeker, 1909, OCLC 423237
- Ashby, Thomas (1910). "Ancona" . Encyclopædia Britannica. Vol. 1 (11th ed.). pp. 951–952.
- Benjamin Vincent (1910), "Ancona", Haydn's Dictionary of Dates (25th ed.), London: Ward, Lock & Co., hdl:2027/uc2.ark:/13960/t41r6xh8t
- Roy Domenico (2002). "Marche: Ancona". Regions of Italy: a Reference Guide to History and Culture. Greenwood. pp. 209+. ISBN 0313307334.
- John Phillip Lomax (2004). "Ancona". In Christopher Kleinhenz (ed.). Medieval Italy: an Encyclopedia. Routledge. pp. 30–31. ISBN 0415939291.

=== in Italian ===
- Gianmario Filelfo [in Italian]. Chroniche de la cittàde Anchona (in Italian). 15th century
- Alessandro Maggiori (1821). Le pitture, sculture e architetture della città d'Ancona. Arcangelo Sartorj. OCLC 16703463.
- C. Feroso (1884). Guida di Ancona. A. G. Morelli.
- Carlo Lozzi (1887). "Storie de'Municipii: Ancona". Biblioteca istorica della antica e nuova Italia (in Italian). Vol. 1. Imola. pp. 112–116. OCLC 12117233. (bibliography)
- Nicola Bernardini, ed. (1890). "Provincia di Ancona". Guida della stampa periodica italiana (in Italian). Lecce: R. Tipografia editrice salentina dei fratelli Spacciante. hdl:2027/njp.32101074983378.
- "Ancona", Enciclopedia Italiana (in Italian), 1929
