= Mariano Savastano =

Italian prefectural commissioner

Special Commissioner of Lodi
- In office 22 August 2016 – 27 June 2017
- Preceded by: Simone Uggetti (PD); Elected in 2013 election, he was the Mayor in office until 1 August 2016 when he resigned from the office Simonetta Pozzoli (PD) as Deputy Mayor in office from 1 August 2016 to 22 August 2016
- Succeeded by: Sara Casanova (Lega Nord)

Personal details
- Born: 4 February 1964 (age 62)
- Party: Nonpartisan
- Occupation: Prefectural commissioner

Mariano Savastano is an Italian prefectural commissioner, best known because he served as special Commissioner of the city of Lodi, Lombardy.

He was the acting Mayor of Lodi from 2016 to 2017 until Sara Casanova was elected as new Mayor of Lodi in the 2017 early election.
