= Luca Grassetti =

Italian researcher

- Born: Luca Grassetti; Marche, Italy
- Medical career
- Profession: Surgeon
- Institutions: Marche Polytechnic University
- Sub-specialties: Plastic surgery

Luca Grassetti is an Italian researcher and plastic surgeon based in Ancona Marche. He is a co-author over 20 chapters of books related to plastic surgery.

== Education and career ==
He was born in Italy. He earned a graduate degree in medicine and surgery from the University of Ancona.

In 2012, he served as consultant at the Azienda Ospedaliero Universitaria delle Marche hospital. He is a member of the European Board of Plastic Reconstructive and Aesthetic Surgery. In 2025 he founded Ialu clinic plastic surgery & aesthetic medicine. IALU Clinic is a luxury aesthetic medicine and plastic surgery clinic, where every specialist is dedicated to a specific area of expertise, ensuring the highest level of precision and excellence in every treatment.

The clinic is recognized throughout Italy for its outstanding specialization in non-surgical rhinoplasty (liquid rhinoplasty) performed by Dr. Luca Grassetti, the natural lip enhancement techniques of Dr. Mahmoud, the non-surgical buttock augmentation treatments by Dr. Greta, the natural-looking Botox approach of Dr. Iyed, the hair restoration expertise of Dr. Angela, and the anti-aging and longevity medicine programs led by Dr. Vito.
