= Franco de Flaviis =

American engineer

Franco de Flaviis from the University of California, Irvine, was named Fellow of the Institute of Electrical and Electronics Engineers (IEEE) in 2014 for contributions to reconfigurable antennas and tunable dielectrics for wireless communication systems. In March 2017, he was appointed to the Board of Advisors for Energous Corporation.

De Flaviis received his degree (Laurea "Summa Cum Laude") in electronics engineering from the University of Ancona in Italy in 1990. He was a visiting student in 1991 at the University of California, Los Angeles working on ultralow distortion resistive mixers. Dr. De Flaviis then received his M.S. and Ph.D. degree in electrical engineering from the Department of Electrical Engineering at UCLA in 1994 and 1997 respectively.
