= 2013 Italian local elections =

The 2013 Italian local elections were held on different dates; most on 26–27 May, with a second round on 9–10 June. In Italy, direct elections were held in 720 municipalities: in each municipality (comune) were chosen mayor and members of the City Council. Of the 720 municipalities, 20 were provincial capitals and only 171 had a population higher than 15,000 inhabitants (10,000 for Sicily).

In Friuli-Venezia Giulia the elections were held on 21–22 April with a second ballot on 5–6 May; all of 13 municipalities of the region voted for a new mayor and a new City Council concurrently with the Regional elections.

In Sicily the elections were held on 9–10 June with a second ballot on 23–24 June.

There weren't provincial elections around Italy because of their abolition (also in Sicily, since 2012), except for Friuli-Venezia Giulia: in this region citizens elected a new president and a new Provincial Council in Province of Udine.

== Voting System ==
All mayoral elections in Italy in cities with a population higher than 15,000 use the same voting system. Under this system voters express a direct choice for the mayor or an indirect choice voting for the party of the candidate's coalition. If no candidate receives at least 50% of votes, the top two candidates go to a second round after two weeks. This gives a result whereby the winning candidate may be able to claim majority support, although it is not guaranteed.

The election of the City Council is based on a direct choice for the candidate with a preference vote: the candidate with the majority of the preferences is elected. The number of the seats for each party is determined proportionally.

== Results ==
Majority of each coalition in 92 municipalities (comuni) with a population higher than 15,000:

Coalition	Comuni
Centre-left coalition	54
Centre-right coalition	14
Five Star Movement	2
Independents and others	22

=== Party results ===
Party votes in 21 provincial capital municipalities:

Party	Votes
Democratic Party	440,392
The People of Freedom	294,689
Five Star Movement	186,047
Left Ecology Freedom	91,937
Union of the Centre	39,749
Civic Choice	22,558
Northern League	16,201

=== Mayoral election results ===
Cities	Population	Incumbent mayor	Party	Elected mayor	Party
Avellino	54,697	Giuseppe Galasso	Centre-left	Paolo Foti	Centre-left
Rome	2,865,151	Gianni Alemanno	Centre-right coalition	Ignazio Marino	Centre-left
Viterbo	63,597	Giulio Marini	Centre-right coalition	Leonardo Michelini	Centre-left
Imperia	42,667	Paolo Strescino	Centre-right coalition	Carlo Capacci	Centre-left
Brescia	192,794	Adriano Paroli	Centre-right coalition	Emilio Del Bono	Centre-left
Lodi	43,465	Lorenzo Guerini	Centre-left	Simone Uggetti	Centre-left
Sondrio	21,641	Alcide Molteni	Centre-left	Alcide Molteni	Centre-left
Ancona	102,997	Fiorello Gramillano	Centre-left	Valeria Mancinelli	Centre-left
Isernia	22,150	Ugo De Vivo	Centre-left	Luigi Brasiello	Centre-left
Barletta	94,459	Nicola Maffei	Centre-left	Pasquale Cascella	Centre-left
Iglesias	27,493	Luigi Perseu	Centre-right coalition	Emilio Agostino Gariazzo	Centre-left
Massa	69,004	Roberto Pucci	Centre-left	Alessandro Volpi	Centre-left
Pisa	88,627	Marco Filippeschi	Centre-left	Marco Filippeschi	Centre-left
Siena	54,543	Franco Ceccuzzi	Centre-left	Bruno Valentini	Centre-left
Treviso	82,807	Gian Paolo Gobbo	Centre-right coalition	Giovanni Manildo	Centre-left
Vicenza	115,927	Achille Variati	Centre-left	Achille Variati	Centre-left
Catania	291,300	Raffaele Stancanelli	Centre-right coalition	Enzo Bianco	Centre-left
Syracuse	122,304	Roberto Visentin	Centre-right coalition	Giancarlo Garrozzo	Centre-left
Messina	242,700	Giuseppe Buzzanca	Centre-right coalition	Renato Accorinti	Civic
Ragusa	72,812	Nello Di Pasquale	Centre-right coalition	Federico Piccitto	Five Star

=== City councils ===
City	PD	PdL	LN	SEL	M5S	UDC	Others
Brescia	15	4	2	2	1	0	6
Lodi	18	2	3	2	1	0	4
Sondrio	12	3	1	0	1	0	9
Treviso	18	1	2	2	1	1	5
Vicenza	11	3	2	0	2	1	13
Udine	14	5	1	2	4	0	12
Imperia	20	5	0	1	1	0	1
Massa	17	0	0	2	2	1	5
Pisa	15	3	0	2	2	0	5
Siena	17	2	0	2	1	0	4
Ancona	18	2	0	1	3	1	5
Rome	19	7	0	4	3	0	12
Viterbo	19	4	0	1	1	0	3
Isernia	13	3	0	1	0	2	12
Avellino	18	1	0	0	0	4	7
Barletta	13	3	0	4	1	0	9
Catania	27	7	0	0	0	0	11
Messina	23	7	0	0	0	6	4
Ragusa	3	1	0	0	18	1	6
Siracusa	24	9	0	0	0	0	7
Iglesias	12	2	0	2	0	0	7
