= Savastano =

Savastano is a surname. Notable people with the surname include:

- Mariano Savastano (born 1964), Italian prefectural commissioner
- Mauro Savastano (born 1997), Dutch footballer
- Antonio Savastano (born 1991), Italian opera singer
