= Renato Galeazzi =

Italian politician (born 1945)

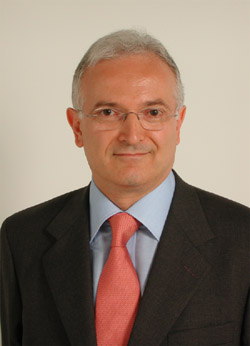

Mayor of Ancona
- In office 23 January 1993 – 16 March 2001
- Preceded by: Franco Del Mastro
- Succeeded by: Fabio Sturani

Member of the Chamber of Deputies
- In office 30 May 2001 – 28 April 2008

Personal details
- Born: 22 October 1945 (age 80) Ancona, Marche, Italy
- Party: Italian Communist Party (until 1991); Democratic Party of the Left (1991-1998); Democrats of the Left (1998-2007)
- Education: University of Bologna
- Profession: physician

Renato Galeazzi (born 22 October 1945) is an Italian politician who served as a Deputy (2001–2008) and Mayor of Ancona (1993–2001).

== Biography ==
In 1970, he graduated from the University of Bologna and began his career as a physician. He subsequently completed fellowships in gastroenterology and infectious diseases, first in University of Modena and Reggio Emilia and then in New York City. In 1989, he became chief of staff at the Regional Hospital of Ancona. He is married and has two children.

He was elected List of mayors of Ancona in the local elections of June 1993 and re-elected in the 1997 local elections, but resigned in March 2001. He served as regional president of the National Association of Italian Municipalities from 1993 to 2001.

He was elected in 2001 as a member of the 14th Parliament representing the Democrats of the Left, and was re-elected for the 15th Parliament (2006) as a member of the Olive Tree coalition.

In the 2009 local elections, he ran again for mayor of Ancona as a candidate backed by the Civic list (Italy) “Renato Galeazzi, the Mayor” and received 8.21% of the vote.

On June 30, 2009, the Public Prosecutor’s Office of Ancona charged him, along with former mayor Fabio Sturani, with the crimes of extortion and embezzlement to the detriment of the waste management company “Anconambiente.” On October 14, 2010, the Summary judgment, and the preliminary hearing judge acquitted Galeazzi on the grounds that he had not committed the offense. On November 8, 2012, the Court of Appeals upheld the acquittal.

Political offices
Preceded by Franco Del Mastro	Mayor of Ancona; 1993–2001	Succeeded by Fabio Sturani
