= List of mayors of Ancona =

Mayor of Ancona
- Sindaco di Ancona

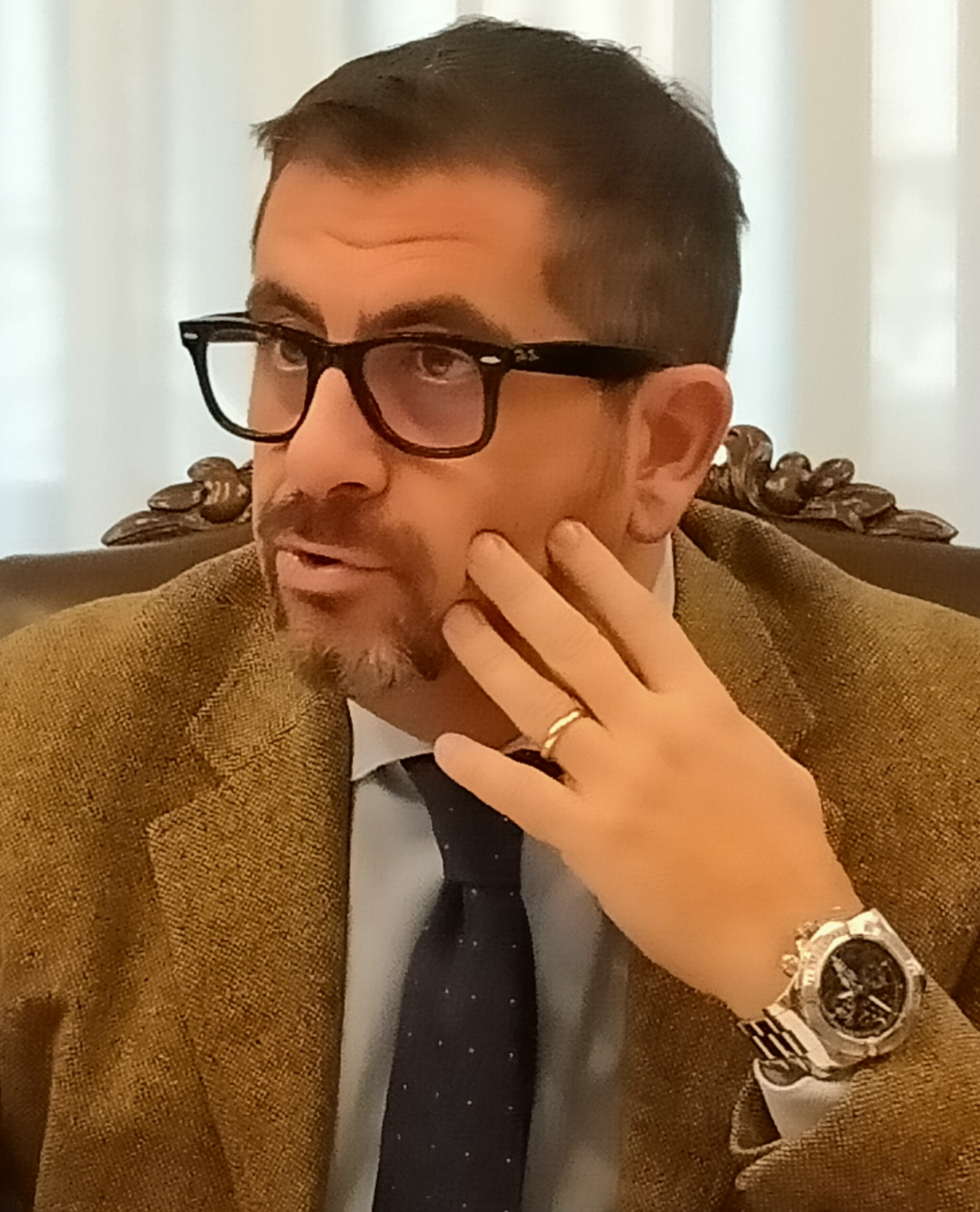
- Incumbent; Daniele Silvetti (FI) since 30 May 2023
- Appointer: Popular election
- Term length: 5 years, renewable once
- Formation: 1861
- Website: Official website

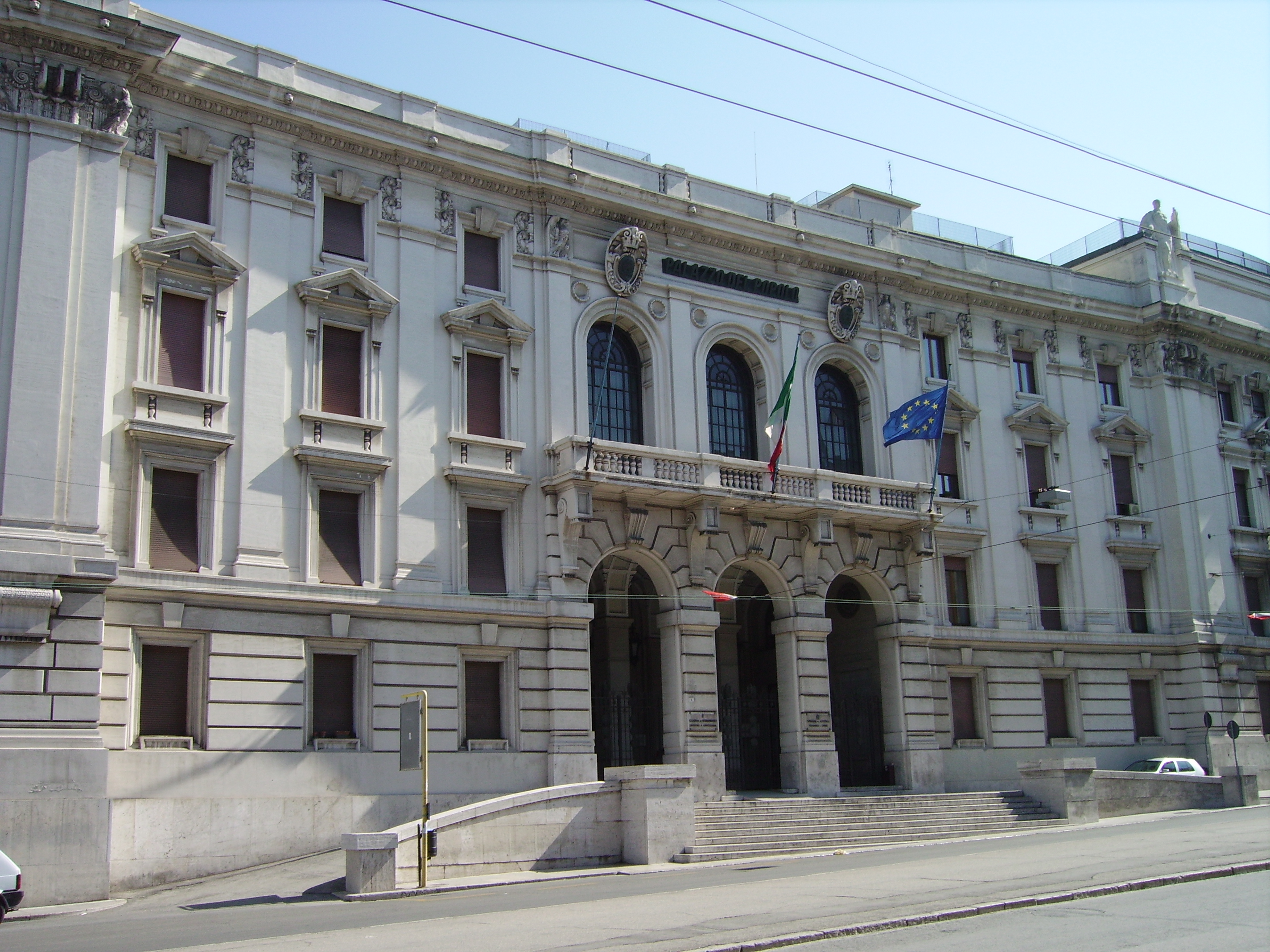
Ancona Town Hall.

The mayor of Ancona is an elected politician who, along with the Ancona's city council, is accountable for the strategic government of Ancona in Marche, Italy.

The current mayor is Daniele Silvetti (FI), who took office on 30 May 2023.

== Overview ==
According to the Italian Constitution, the mayor of Ancona is member of the city council.

The mayor is elected by the population of Ancona, who also elects the members of the city council, controlling the mayor's policy guidelines and is able to enforce his resignation by a motion of no confidence. The mayor is entitled to appoint and release the members of his government.

Since 1993 the mayor is elected directly by Ancona's electorate: in all mayoral elections in Italy in cities with a population higher than 15,000 the voters express a direct choice for the mayor or an indirect choice voting for the party of the candidate's coalition. If no candidate receives at least 50% of votes, the top two candidates go to a second round after two weeks. The election of the City Council is based on a direct choice for the candidate with a preference vote: the candidate with the majority of the preferences is elected. The number of the seats for each party is determined proportionally.

== Kingdom of Italy (1861-1946) ==
Term start	Term end	Officeholder	Party	Position
1860	1867	Michele Fazioli		Mayor
1867	1872	Francesco Matteucci		Mayor
1872	1873	Alessandro Bernardi		Mayor
1873	1874	Nicola Fanelli		Mayor
1873	1873	Nicola Fanelli		Extraordinary Commissioner
1876	1876	Giovanni Battista Bosdari		Mayor
1876	1877	Lorenzo Pratilli		Mayor
1877	1878	Carlo Moroder		Mayor
1878	1879	Francesco De Bosis		Mayor
1878	1878	Domenico Fabretti		Extraordinary Delegate
1878	1878	Gaspare Vecchini		Senior Councilor
1879	1880	Alessandro Bernardi		Mayor
1879	1879	Sigismondo Trionfi		Mayor
1880	1889	Terenzio Frediani		Mayor
1889	1890	Sigismondo Trionfi		Mayor
1890	1891	Luigi Dari		Mayor
1891	1893	Francesco Gabrielli		Mayor
1893	1895	Arturo Vecchini		Mayor
1895	1896	Raffaele Jona		Mayor
1896	1897	Terenzio Frediani		Mayor
1897	1898	Carlo Moroder		Mayor
1899	1902	Luigi Dari		Mayor
1902	1902	Rigoberto Petrelli		Mayor
1902	1903	Eduardo Verdinois		Royal Commissioner
1902	1904	Luigi Dari		Mayor
1903	1904	Lorenzo Bucci Casari		Mayor
1904	1906	Augusto Moroder		Mayor
1906	1906	Alfredo Felici		Mayor
1906	1907	Vittorio Menzinger		Royal Commissioner
1907	1909	Rigoberto Petrelli		Mayor
1909	1912	Alfredo Felici		Mayor
1910	1910	Guglielmo Bonarelli		Mayor
1910	1910	Francesco Francesconi		Mayor
1910	1911	Guglielmo Bonarelli		Mayor
1911	1912	Alfredo Felici		Mayor
1914	1915	Francesco Crispo Moncada		Mayor
1912	1914	Umberto Veschi		Prefectural Commissioner
1914	1914	Roberto Berti		Mayor
1915	1919	Alfredo Felici		Mayor
1919	1919	Rinaldo Vignini		Mayor
1919	1919	Giannantonio Mecozzi		Mayor
1919	1919	Gio. Batta Rossi		Mayor
1919	1920	Rinaldo Vignini		Mayor
1920	1922	Domenico Pacetti		Mayor
1922	1923	Giovanni Maggiotto		Mayor
1923	1926	Enrico Guido Fabi		Mayor
1926	1939	Riccardo Moroder		Podestà
1939	1943	Franco Andriani		Podestà
1943	1943	Francesco Blandaleone		Prefectural Commissioner
1943	1943	Loricchio		Prefectural Commissioner
1943	1943	Giardina		Prefectural Commissioner
1943	1944	Salvatore Zammit		
1944	1946	Franco Patrignani	Italian Communist Party	Mayor
1944	1945	Remo Roja	Italian Socialist Party	Mayor
1945	1946	Luigi Ruggeri	Italian Communist Party	Mayor

== Italian Republic (since 1946) ==
=== City Council election (1946–1993) ===
From 1946 to 1993, the Mayor of Ancona was elected by the City Council.

	Mayor	Term start	Term end	Party
1	Giuseppe Mario Marsigliani	1946	1949	PRI
2	Francesco Angelini	1949	1950	PRI
3	Enrico Barchiesi	1950	1951	PRI
(2)	Francesco Angelini	1951	1964	PRI
4	Alfredo Trifogli	1964	1964	DC
5	Artemio Strazzi	1964	1964	PSI
–	Renato Abbadessa	1964	1965	Special Commissioner
6	Claudio Salmoni	1965	1967	PRI
7	Francesco D'Alessio	1967	1967	DC
–	Renato Abbadessa	1967	1969	Special Commissioner
(4)	Alfredo Trifogli	1969	1976	DC
8	Guido Monina	1976	1988	PRI
9	Franco Del Mastro	1988	1993	PSI
10	Renato Galeazzi	1993	1993	PDS

=== Direct election (since 1993) ===
Since 1993, under provisions of new local administration law, the Mayor of Ancona is chosen by direct election, originally every four, then every five years.

	Mayor of Rome	Took office	Left office	Party	Coalition	Election
(10)	Renato Galeazzi (b. 1945)	21 June 1993	12 May 1997	PDS; DS	PDS • PRI	1993
(10)	Renato Galeazzi (b. 1945)	12 May 1997	16 March 2001 (Note: Resigned to run as candidate in the 2001 national general election.)	PDS; DS	PDS • PRI • FdV • SI	1997
Special Prefectural Commissioner tenure (16 March 2001 – 14 May 2001)
11	Fabio Sturani (b. 1958)	14 May 2001	30 May 2006	DS; PD	DS • DL • PRC • MRE; SDI • FdV	2001
11	Fabio Sturani (b. 1958)	30 May 2006	24 February 2009 (Note: Resigned following a corruption scandal. Acquitted by all charges in 2012.)	DS; PD	DS • DL • PdCI • MRE; SDI • FdV • IdV	2006
Special Prefectural Commissioner tenure (24 February 2009 – 23 June 2009)
12	Fiorello Gramillano (b. 1946)	23 June 2009	17 January 2013 (Note: Resigned.)	PD	PD • IdV • FdS • PSI	2009
Special Prefectural Commissioner tenure (17 January 2013 – 11 June 2013)
13	Valeria Mancinelli (b. 1955)	11 June 2013	25 June 2018	PD	PD • FdV • UDC and left-wing lists	2013
13	Valeria Mancinelli (b. 1955)	25 June 2018	30 May 2023	PD	PD • FdV and left-wing lists	2018
14	Daniele Silvetti (b. 1973)	30 May 2023	Incumbent	FI	FdI • FI • Lega and right-wing lists	2023

== See also ==
- Timeline of Ancona

== Bibliography ==
- Natalucci, Mario (1960). Ancona attraverso i secoli. Dal periodo napoleonico al nostri giorni. Ancona: Unione arti grafiche.
