= Andrea Furegato =

Italian politician (born 1997)

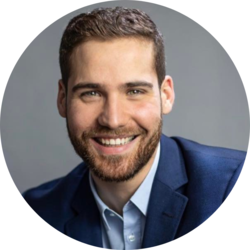
- Furegato in 2022

Mayor of Lodi
- Incumbent
- Assumed office 15 June 2022
- Preceded by: Sara Casanova

Personal details
- Born: 5 June 1997 (age 28)
- Party: Democratic Party

Andrea Furegato (born 5 June 1997) is an Italian politician affiliated with the Democratic Party. He was elected mayor of Lodi in 2022, at the age of 25. In the 2017 local election, he was elected as a municipal councilor, becoming the most voted candidate in Lodi. Due to his young age, his election received a lot of media coverage.
