= Elena Cazzulani =

Italian writer and journalist

Ena Cazzulani
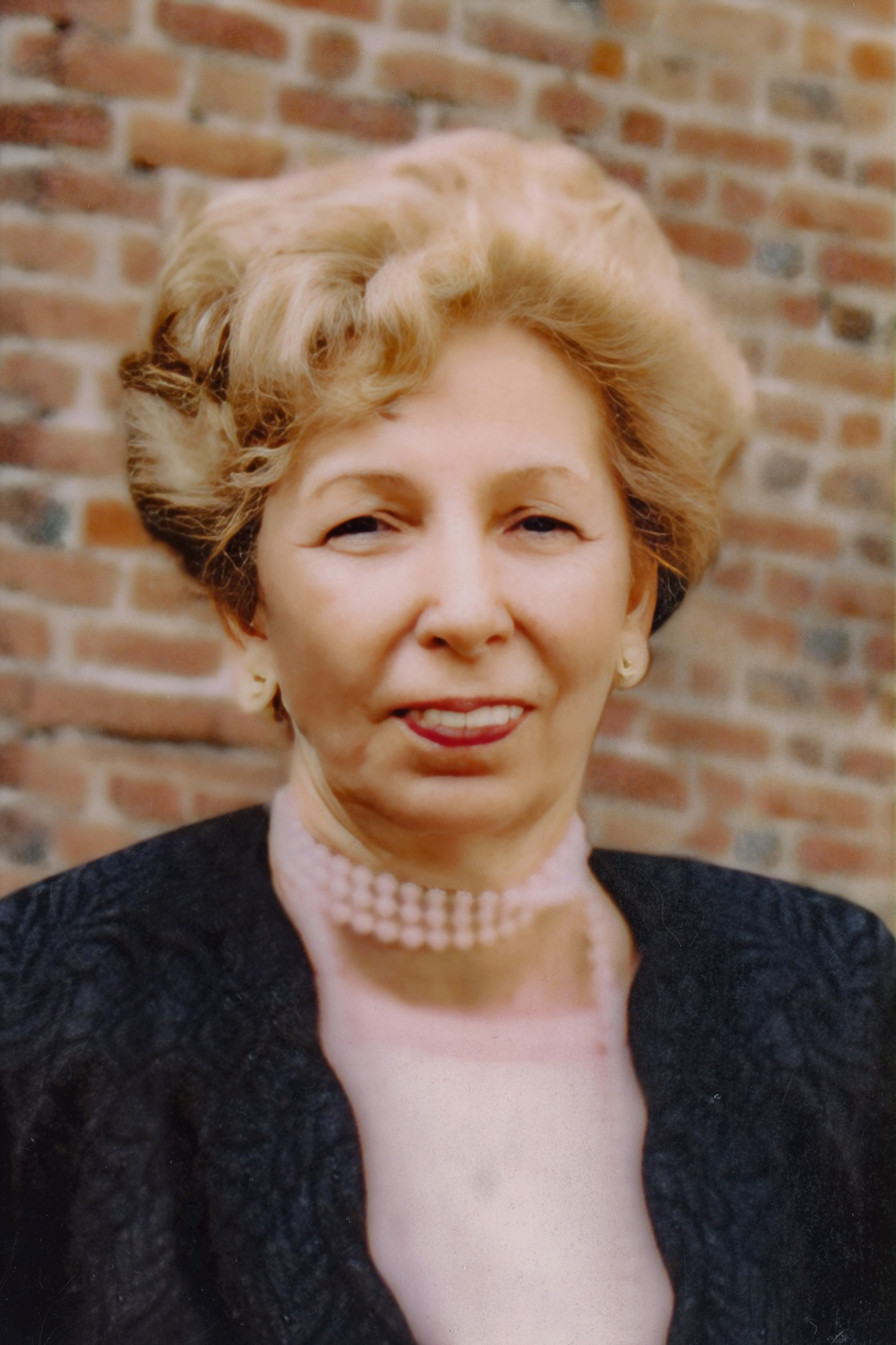
- Elena Cazzulani at the end of '90s
- Born: Elena Cazzulani; December 23, 1920 Lodi, Italy
- Died: October 17, 2005 (aged 84) Vigevano, Italy
- Occupation: Novelist, journalist
- Partner: Antonio Allegri

Ena Cazzulani Allegri, born Elena Cazzulani (1920 – 2008) was an Italian writer and poet. In the 1980s, she founded at her home a literary salon, which became an essential meeting place for the Lodi's intellectuals.

== Biography ==
Elena Cazzulani is born in 1920 in Lodi, and she is the daughter of Giovanni Cazzulani, architect and the last headmaster of the Collegio Cazzulani School, founded by her grandparents, Francesco Cazzulani and Elena Roda. Unlike her closest ancestors, Ena held no administrative position at the school, preferring to dedicate herself to writing. She counted her family history in the book Il collegio Cazzulani (The Cazzulani School) in 1988.

She has written poems, novels, and biographies dedicated to several important women in the region, including Ada Negri, Vittoria Manzoni, Cristina Trivulzio Belgiojoso, Maria Cosway, Carlotta Ferrari, and Giuseppina Strepponi.

The municipality of Lodi dedicated a street to her in December 2014. One of the exterior walls of the Francesco Cazzulani Institute bears her portrait reproduced on a monochrome turquoise ceramic tile, work by Luigi Poletti. Elena Cazzulani died in Vigevano in 2005 at the age of 84.

== Works ==
- 1982: Cristina di Belgioioso, Ed. Lodigraf, Lodi
- 1983: Il muro sul ponte, Ed. Lodigraf, Lodi
- 1984: Giuseppina Strepponi, biografia, Ed. Lodigraf, Lodi
- 1985: en collaboration avec Gilberto Coletto : Francesco de Lemene. Poesia e teatro, Ed. del Campus, Lodi
- 1988: Il collegio Cazzulani, Edizioni Lodigraf, Lodi
- 1989: Maria Hadfield Cosway. Biografia, diari e scritti della fondatrice del collegio delle Dame Inglesi in Lodi, Ed. L’Immagine, Lodi
- 1991: Il viale delle ortensie, Ed. L’Immagine, Lodi
- 1992: Carlotta Ferrari da Lodi. Poetessa e musicista, Ed. L’Immagine, Lodi
- 1993: Ritorno al viale delle ortensie, Ed. L'Immagine, Lodi
- 1996: Il cielo comincia dal suolo, Ed. L’Immagine, Lodi

== Gallery ==
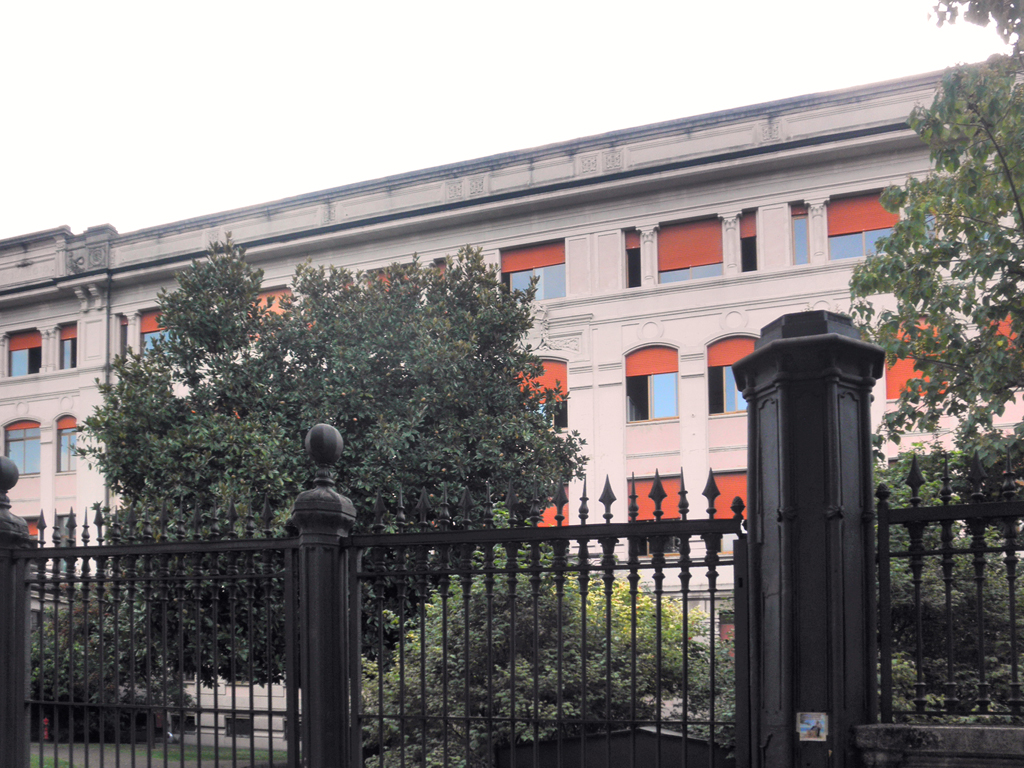
Front-side of Collegio Cazzulani School, founded in 1915.

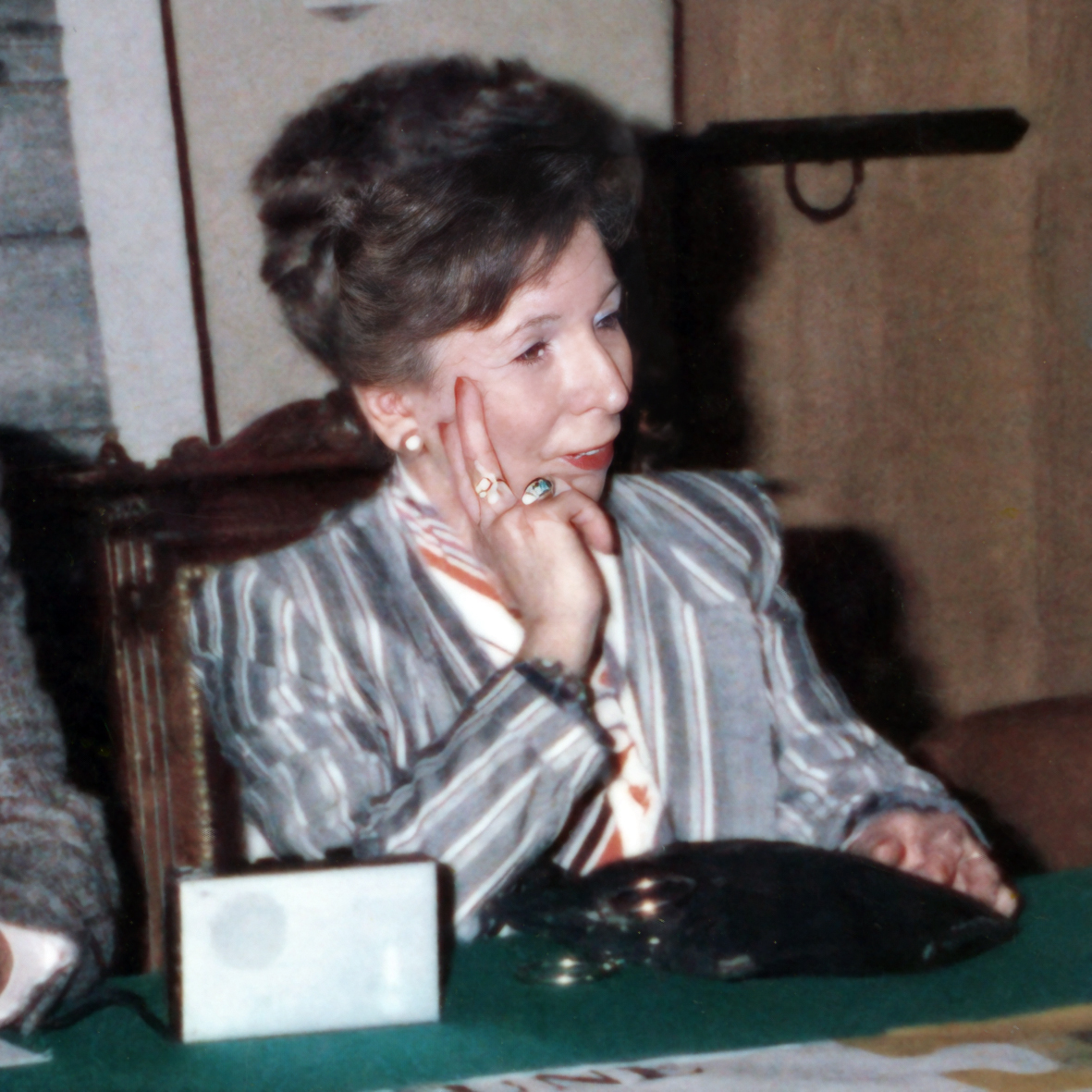
Elena Cazzulani, during a convention, in the 70s years

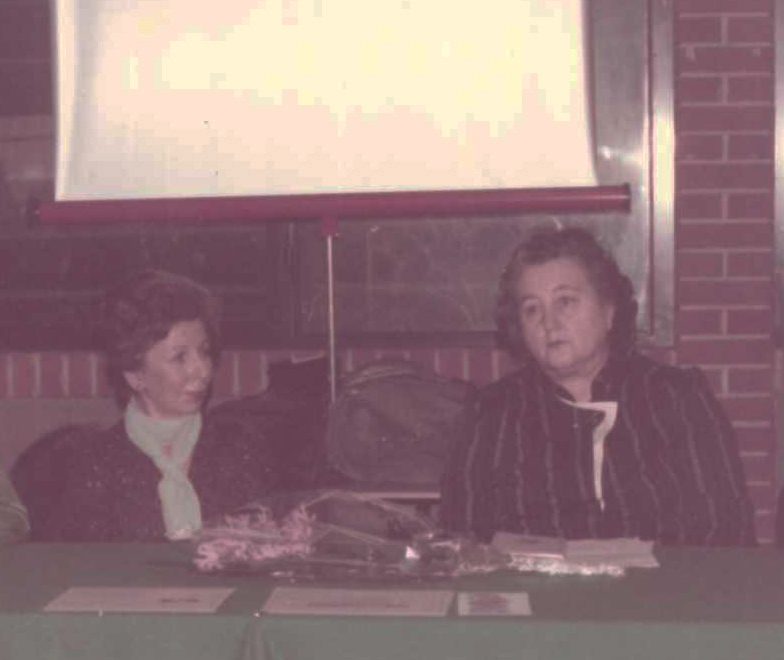
Elena Cazzulani with Giuseppina Ferazza in the '80s years.

== Bibliography ==
- 2006: Ercole Ongaro, Il Lodigiano nel Novecento. La cultura, Franco Angeli, Milano
