= Antonio Allegri (mayor) =

Italian politician (1916-2005)

Mayor of Lodi
- In office 14 December 1960 – 13 July 1962
- Preceded by: Defendente Vaccari
- Succeeded by: Antonio Montani
- In office 20 June 1968 – 17 July 1970
- Preceded by: Natale Riatti
- Succeeded by: Valerio Manfrini

Personal details
- Born: 1916 Lodi, Italy
- Died: 2005 (aged 88–89)
- Party: DC
- Spouse: Elena Cazzulani
- Profession: Medical Doctor

Antonio Allegri (born 1916 in Lodi - died in 2005) was an Italian medical doctor and politician. A member of the Christian Democracy, he served as medical doctor of Lodi's Hospital and the mayor of Lodi, Lombardy, from December 1960 to July 1962 and from June 1968 to JulY 1970.

He served as head of the Department of Anatomic Pathology at the Ospedale Maggiore of Lodi). Researcher and specialist about Paolo Gorini, he oversaw the 1981 restoration and reopening of the Paolo Gorini anatomical collection, which is housed in the city's former hospital.;

Allegri was married with the writer and salonnière Elena Cazzulani; they had four sons.

Political offices
Preceded by Defendente Vaccari	Mayor of Lodi; 1960–1962	Succeeded by Antonio Montani

Political offices
Preceded by Natale Riatti	Mayor of Lodi; 1968–1970	Succeeded by Valerio Manfrini
