= Daniele Silvetti =

Italian politician

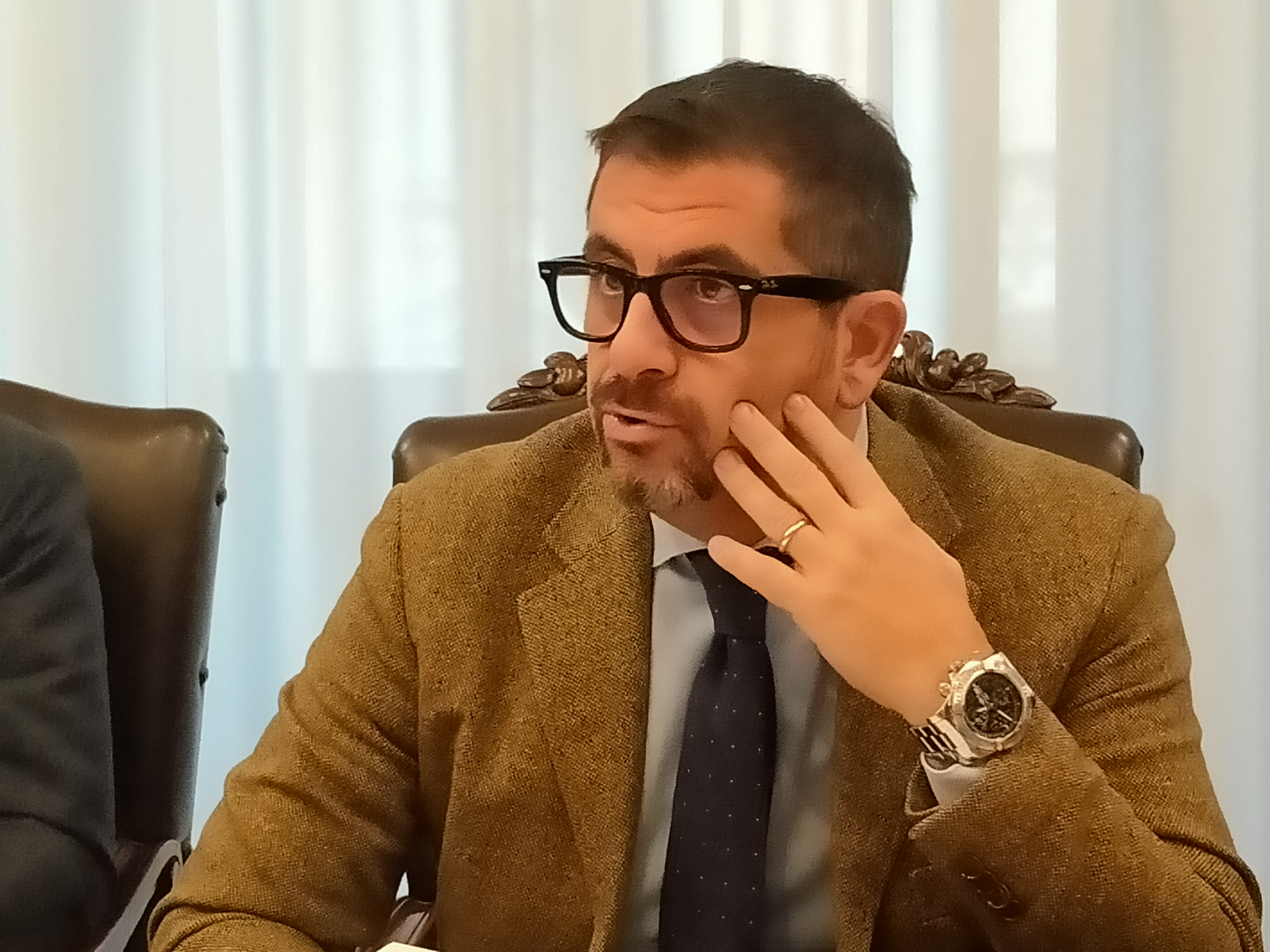

Mayor of Ancona
- Incumbent
- Assumed office 30 May 2023
- Preceded by: Valeria Mancinelli

Personal details
- Born: 17 September 1973 (age 53) Ancona, Italy
- Party: AN (1995-2009); PdL (2009-2013); Forza Italia (since 2013)
- Education: University of Bologna
- Occupation: Lawyer

Daniele Silvetti (born 17 September 1973) is an Italian politician.

A member of Forza Italia, he serves as Mayor of Ancona since 2023, the first of a centre-right party since 1945.

== Biography ==
Silvetti began his political journey in the youth formations of the National Alliance. He joined Forza Italia, of which he became provincial coordinator and deputy coordinator in the northern section of the Marche region.

From 1997 to 2006 he has been a municipal councilor in Ancona, while from 2006 to 2015 he was elected to the Marche Regional Council.

In 2023 he ran for the office of Mayor of Ancona with the support of a centre-right coalition. After prevailing in the first round of elections on May 14 and 15, he also won the runoff with 51.73% of the vote, becoming the city's first centre-right mayor since the introduction of direct elections.

Political offices
Preceded by Valeria Mancinelli	Mayor of Ancona since 2023	Incumbent
