= Alfredo Trifogli =

Italian politician (1920–2013)

Mayor of Ancona
- In office 1964–1964
- Preceded by: Francesco Angelini
- Succeeded by: Artemio Strazzi
- In office 1969–1976
- Preceded by: Francesco D'Alessio
- Succeeded by: Guido Monina

Member of the Italian Senate
- In office 5 July 1976 – 19 June 1979
- In office 23 June 1987 – 1 July 1987

Personal details
- Born: 22 September 1920; Ancona, Kingdom of Italy
- Died: 21 March 2013 (aged 92); Ancona, Marche, Italy
- Political party: Christian Democracy
- Occupation: School principal

Alfredo Trifogli (22 September 1920 – 21 March 2013) was an Italian politician who served as a Senator for two legislatures (1976–1979, 1987) and Mayor of Ancona for three terms (1964, 1969–1973, 1973–1976).
