= List of mayors of Lodi, Lombardy =

Mayor of Lodi
- Sindaco di Lodi

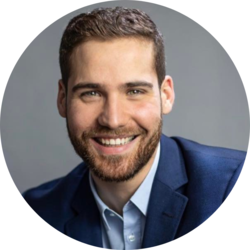
- Incumbent; Andrea Furegato (PD) since 15 June 2022
- Appointer: Popular election
- Term length: 5 years, renewable once
- Formation: 1860
- Website: Official website

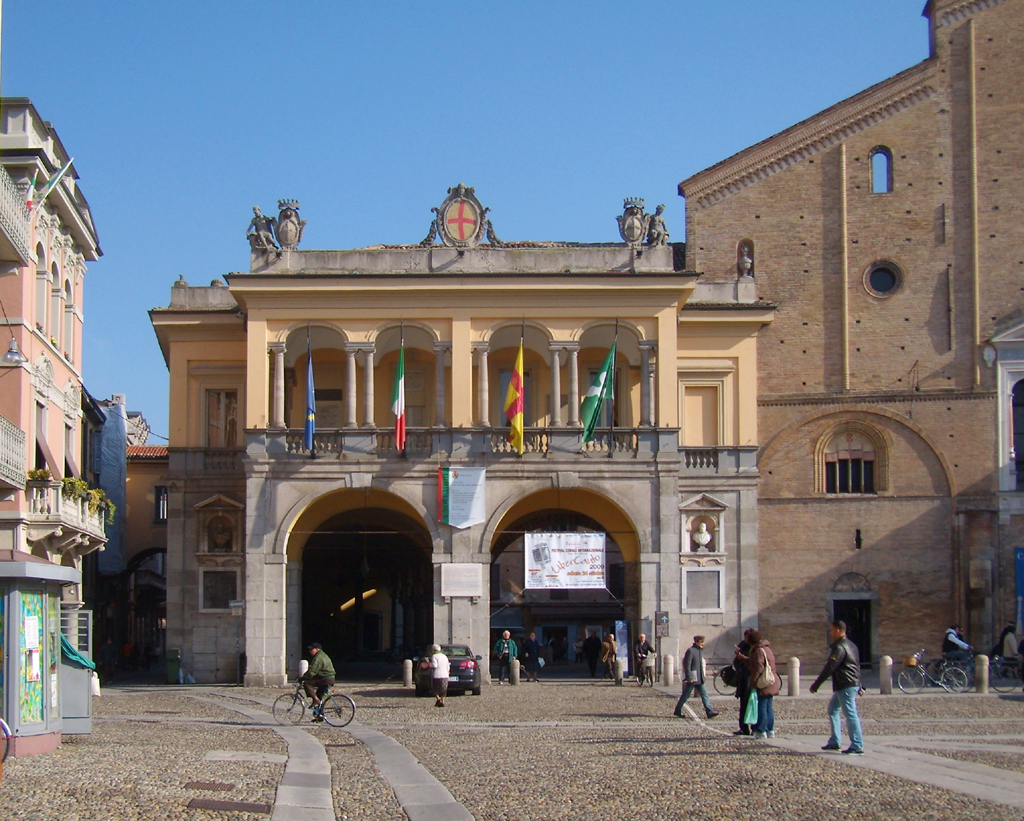
Palazzo Broletto is the seat of the Mayor of Lodi.

The mayor of Lodi is an elected politician who, along with the Lodi's city council, is accountable for the strategic government of Lodi in Lombardy, Italy.

The current mayor is Andrea Furegato (PD), who took office on 15 June 2022.

== Overview ==
According to the Italian Constitution, the mayor of Lodi is member of the city council.

The mayor is elected by the population of Lodi, who also elects the members of the city council, controlling the mayor's policy guidelines and is able to enforce his resignation by a motion of no confidence. The mayor is entitled to appoint and release the members of his government.

Since 1993, the mayor is elected directly by Lodi's electorate: in all mayoral elections in Italy in cities with a population higher than 15,000 the voters express a direct choice for the mayor or an indirect choice voting for the party of the candidate's coalition. If no candidate receives at least 50% of votes, the top two candidates go to a second round after two weeks. The election of the City Council is based on a direct choice for the candidate with a preference vote: the candidate with the majority of the preferences is elected. The number of the seats for each party is determined proportionally.

== Italian Republic (since 1946) ==
=== City Council election (1946–1993) ===
From 1946 to 1993, the mayor of Lodi was elected by the city council.

| | Mayor | Term start | Term end | Party |
|---|---|---|---|---|
| 1 | Defendente Vaccari | 2 April 1946 | 16 June 1951 | DC |
| 2 | Apollonio Oliva | 16 June 1951 | 11 November 1952 | DC |
| 3 | Natale Riatti | 11 November 1952 | 26 June 1956 | DC |
| (1) | Defendente Vaccari | 26 June 1956 | 14 December 1960 | DC |
| 4 | Antonio Allegri | 14 December 1960 | 13 July 1962 | DC |
| 5 | Antonio Montani | 13 July 1962 | 12 January 1965 | DC |
| (3) | Natale Riatti | 12 January 1965 | 20 June 1968 | DC |
| (4) | Antonio Allegri | 20 June 1968 | 17 July 1970 | DC |
| 6 | Valerio Manfrini | 17 July 1970 | 6 September 1975 | DC |
| 7 | Gianfranco Meani | 6 September 1975 | 18 September 1975 | PRI |
| 8 | Edgardo Alboni | 18 September 1975 | 17 September 1980 | PCI |
| 9 | Andrea Cancellato | 17 September 1980 | 10 July 1990 | PSI |
| (5) | Antonio Montani | 10 July 1990 | 8 October 1992 | DC |
| 10 | Marco Magrini | 8 October 1992 | 13 September 1993 | DC |
Special Prefectural Commissioner tenure (13 September 1993 – 6 December 1993)

=== Direct election (since 1993) ===
Since 1993, under provisions of new local administration law, the mayor of Lodi is chosen by direct election, originally every four then every five years.

| | Mayor | Term start | Term end | Party | Coalition | Election |
|---|---|---|---|---|---|---|
| 11 | Alberto Segalini (b. 1955) | 6 December 1993 | 22 December 1995 (Note: Resigned.) | LN | LN | 1993 |
Special Prefectural Commissioner tenure (22 December 1995 – 11 July 1996)
| 12 | Aurelio Ferrari (b. 1948) | 11 July 1996 | 2 May 2000 | PPI; DL | PDS • PPI • RI • SI | 1996 |
| 12 | Aurelio Ferrari (b. 1948) | 2 May 2000 | 7 April 2005 | PPI; DL | DS • PPI • PRC | 2000 |
| 13 | Lorenzo Guerini (b. 1966) | 7 April 2005 | 1 April 2010 | DL; PD | DS • DL • PRC • PdCI • SDI | 2005 |
| 13 | Lorenzo Guerini (b. 1966) | 1 April 2010 | 31 December 2012 (Note: Resigned in order to participate in the national general election.) | DL; PD | PD • IdV • FdS | 2010 |
Special Prefectural Commissioner tenure (1 January 2013 – 11 June 2013)
| 14 | Simone Uggetti (b. 1973) | 11 June 2013 | 31 July 2016 (Note: Resigned.) | PD | PD • SEL • PRC | 2013 |
Special Prefectural Commissioner tenure (1 August 2016 – 27 June 2017)
| 15 | Sara Casanova (b. 1977) | 27 June 2017 | 15 June 2022 | LN | LN • FI • FdI | 2017 |
| 16 | Andrea Furegato (b. 1997) | 15 June 2022 | Incumbent | PD | PD • SI • EV • A • IV | 2022 |

== Bibliography ==
- Bigatti, Giorgio (2005). Il Municipio e la Città. Il Consiglio comunale di Lodi (1859–1970). Milan: Silvana Editoriale. ISBN 888215999X.
