= Fiorello Gramillano =

Italian politician

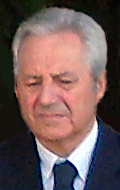

Mayor of Ancona
- In office 23 June 2009 – 17 January 2013
- Preceded by: Fabio Sturani
- Succeeded by: Valeria Mancinelli

Personal details
- Born: 1 February 1946 (age 80) Campello sul Clitunno, Umbria, Italy
- Party: Democratic Party
- Education: University of Perugia
- Profession: professor

Fiorello Gramillano (born 1 February 1946) is an Italian politician.

He is a member of the Democratic Party. Gramillano was elected mayor of Ancona at the 2009 Italian local elections, supported by a centr-left coalition, and took office on 23 June 2009. He served until 17 January 2013.

Political offices
Preceded by Fabio Sturani	Mayor of Ancona; 2009–2013	Succeeded by Valeria Mancinelli
