= Ancona Lighthouse =

Lighthouse in Italy

Colle Cappuccini
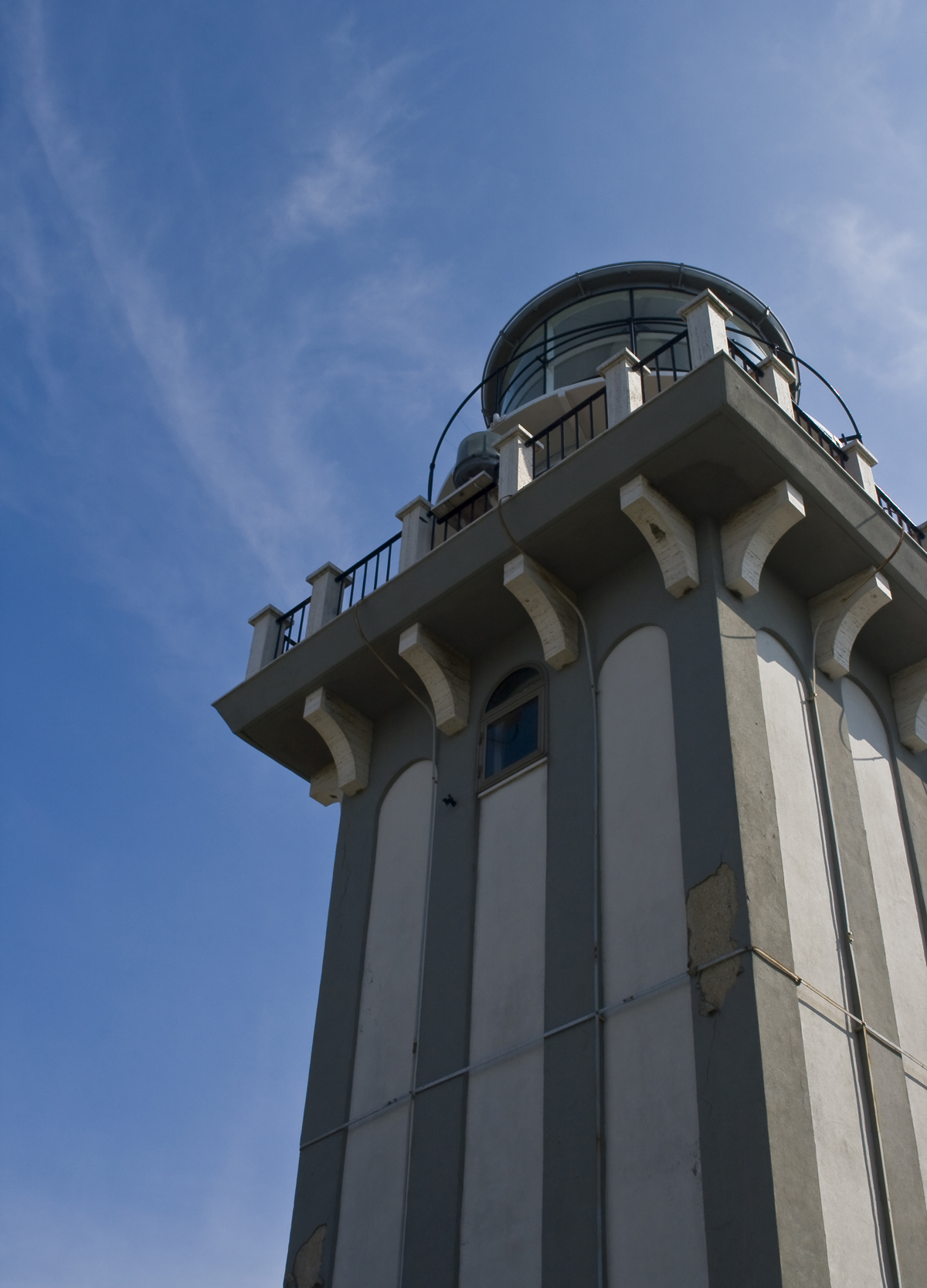
- The new lighthouse
- Location: Ancona; Marche; Italy
- Coordinates: 43°37′22″N 13°30′57″E

Tower
- Constructed: 1860 (first)
- Foundation: concrete base
- Construction: concrete tower
- Height: 15 metres (49 ft) (current); 20 metres (66 ft) (first)
- Shape: quadrangular tower with double balcony
- Markings: white and grey vertical stripes, grey lantern
- Power source: mains electricity
- Operator: Marina Militare
- Fog signal: no

Light
- First lit: 1965 (current)
- Deactivated: 1965 (first)
- Focal height: 118 metres (387 ft)
- Lens: Type OR Q4 (original), 1st order fresnel lens (current)
- Intensity: main. AL 1000 W reserve: LABI 100 W
- Range: main: 25 nautical miles (46 km; 29 mi) reserve: 18 nautical miles (33 km; 21 mi)
- Characteristic: Fl (4) W 30s.
- Italy no.: 3930

Ancona Lighthouse (Italian: Faro di Ancona) is a lighthouse in Ancona on the Adriatic Sea. It is placed on the hill named Monte Cappuccini, from which takes the name, about 119.5 metres from the old lighthouse deactivated in 1965.

== Description ==
The old lighthouse was built for will of Pope Pius IX when the region was under the Papal States in 1860. It was a cylindrical tower in red bricks built on a quadrangular basement; it had the focal height at 123.82 feet (37.74 m) metres above sea level and emitted a white flashing light every 45 seconds.

The current lighthouse was built in 1971, it is a square base tower in concrete 15 metres high with double balcony ad lantern. The lighthouse is fully automated, operated by Marina Militare and emits four white flashes every 30 seconds visible up to 25 nautical miles.

== See also ==
- List of lighthouses in Italy
