= Simone Uggetti =

Italian politician (born 1973)

Mayor of Lodi
- In office 11 June 2013 – 31 July 2016
- Preceded by: Lorenzo Guerini
- Succeeded by: Sara Casanova

Personal details
- Born: 24 July 1973 (age 53) Sant'Angelo Lodigiano, Italy
- Party: PDS (until 1998); DS (1998–2007); PD (since 2007)
- Profession: Employee

Simone Uggetti (born 24 July 1973 in Sant'Angelo Lodigiano) is an Italian politician. A member of the Democratic Party, he served as the mayor of Lodi, Lombardy, from June 2013 to July 2016.

== Biography ==
Born in Sant'Angelo Lodigiano(Lodi) but raised in Graffignana (Lodi), he earned his high school diploma from the Giovanni Gandini Scientific High School in Lodi. On June 28, 2014, he married Chiara Mariani in a civil ceremony in Arena Po (Pavia).

== See also ==
- 2013 Italian local elections

Political offices
| Preceded by Lorenzo Guerini | Mayor of Lodi; 2013–2016 | Succeeded by Sara Casanova |
