= Sara Casanova =

Italian politician (born 1977)

Mayor of Lodi
- In office 27 June 2017 – 15 June 2022
- Preceded by: Simone Uggetti
- Succeeded by: Andrea Furegato

Personal details
- Born: 24 June 1977 (age 49) Lodi, Lombardy, Italy
- Party: Lega Nord
- Education: Polytechnic University of Milan
- Profession: architect

Sara Casanova (born 24 June 1977 in Lodi) is an Italian politician.

She is a member of the right-wing populist party Lega Nord and she has served as Mayor of Lodi from 2017 to 2022.

== See also ==
- 2017 Italian local elections
- List of mayors of Lodi, Lombardy

Political offices
Preceded by Simone Uggetti	Mayor of Lodi; 2017-2022	Succeeded by Andrea Furegato
