= Lorenzo Guerini =

Italian politician (born 1966)

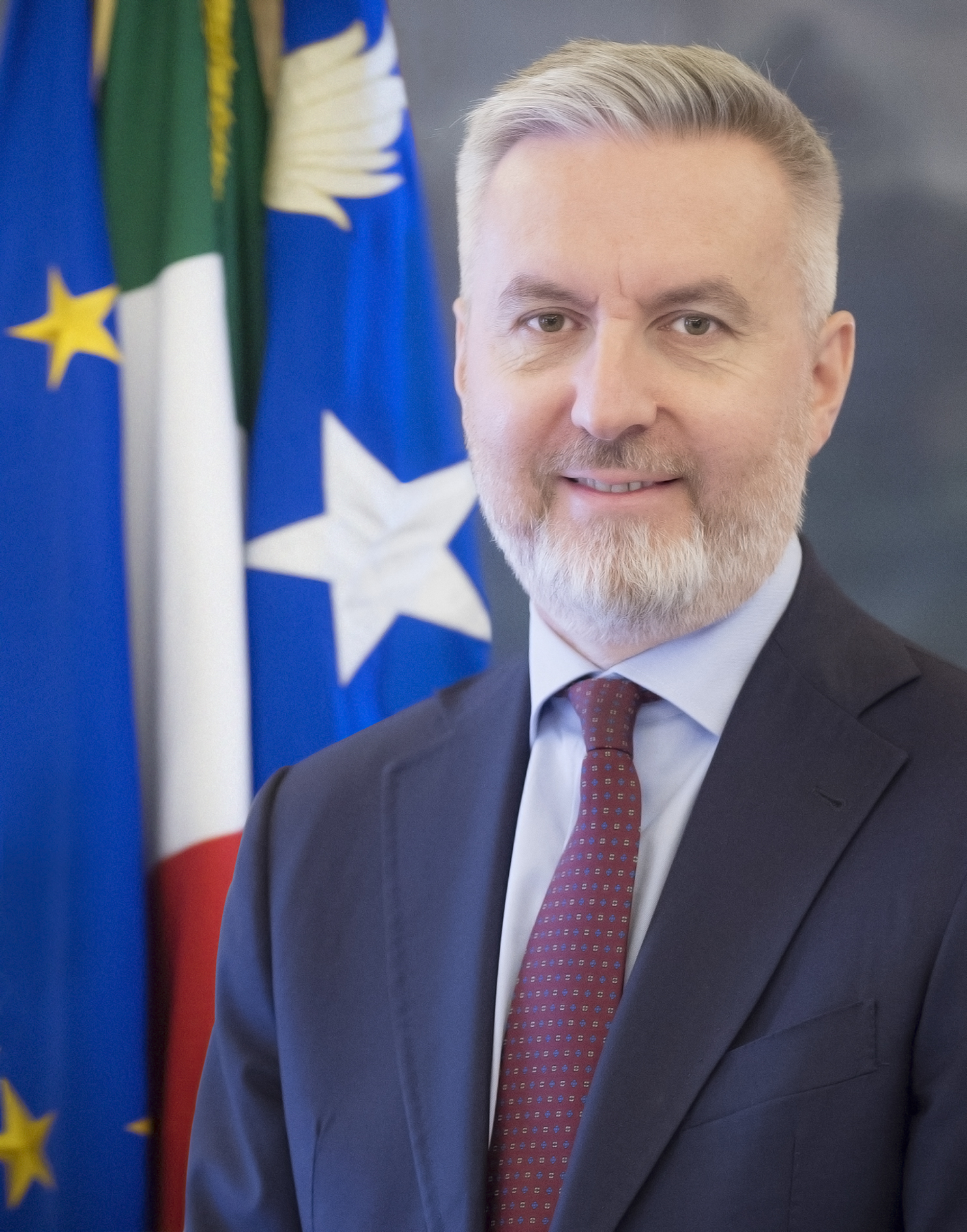

Minister of Defence
- In office 5 September 2019 – 22 October 2022
- Prime Minister: Giuseppe Conte; Mario Draghi
- Preceded by: Elisabetta Trenta
- Succeeded by: Guido Crosetto

President of COPASIR
- Incumbent
- Assumed office 6 December 2022
- Preceded by: Adolfo Urso
- In office 18 July 2018 – 4 September 2019
- Preceded by: Giacomo Stucchi
- Succeeded by: Raffaele Volpi

Deputy Secretary of the Democratic Party
- In office 28 March 2014 – 7 May 2017 Serving with Debora Serracchiani
- Leader: Matteo Renzi
- Preceded by: Enrico Letta
- Succeeded by: Maurizio Martina

Member of the Chamber of Deputies
- Incumbent
- Assumed office 15 March 2013
- Constituency: Lombardy

Mayor of Lodi
- In office 7 April 2005 – 31 December 2012
- Preceded by: Aurelio Ferrari
- Succeeded by: Simone Uggetti

President of the Province of Lodi
- In office 8 May 1995 – 28 June 2004
- Preceded by: Office established
- Succeeded by: Lino Osvaldo Felissari

Personal details
- Born: 21 November 1966 (age 59) Lodi, Italy
- Party: DC (before 1994); PPI (1994–2002); DL (2002–2007); PD (since 2007)
- Children: 3
- Education: Università Cattolica del Sacro Cuore

Lorenzo Guerini (born 21 November 1966) is an Italian politician and member of the Democratic Party (PD). Guerini has been serving as the Italian Minister of Defence in the cabinets of successive prime ministers Giuseppe Conte and Mario Draghi from 2019 to 2022. In March 2014, he was chosen by party leader Matteo Renzi to be deputy secretary of the PD along with Debora Serracchiani, a position that he held until May 2017. From 2005 to 2012, he served as mayor of Lodi, Lombardy, his hometown.

== Early life and education ==
Guerini was born in Lodi, Lombardy, in 1966. During the 1970s he attended the Agostino Bassi Institute in Lodi. He later graduated in political science at the Cattolica University of Milan.

== Political career ==
=== Career in local politics ===
Guerini began his political career at the beginning of the 1990s in the ranks of the Christian Democracy (DC). He was elected twice as municipal councilor in Lodi for the DC, where he also carried out the functions of councilor for social services. In 1994 he was chosen as the local coordinator of the new-born Italian People's Party (PPI), the direct heir of DC.

In May 1995, Guerini was elected first president of the Province of Lodi representing the centre-left coalition and becoming the youngest provincial president in Italy at the age of 28. In June 1999 he won a second term, during which, following the dissolution of the Italian People's Party, he The Daisy (DL), a Christian leftist political party, of which he became a main national leader.

In the 2005 local elections, Guerini was elected Mayor of Lodi for the centre-left, obtaining 54.1% of valid votes in the first round; he was also appointed president of the Lombardy section of the National Association of Italian Municipalities (ANCI) between 2005 and 2010. Together with the majority of The Daisy members, in 2007 he joined the Democratic Party (PD), the new centre-left party, born from the union between The Daisy and the Democrats of the Left.

In the 2010 local elections, Guerini was again elected mayor in the first round of voting, with 53.7% of the votes. During his term as mayor he enjoyed a broad and widespread popular consensus, becoming one of the most appreciated mayors in Italy. On 31 December 2012, Guerini resigned from his post, in order to present his candidacy for the upcoming parliamentary election in February 2013, in compliance with the eligibility conditions.

=== Deputy secretary of the PD ===
After winning the special primaries organized by the Democratic Party, Guerini was included in the list of candidates for the Lombardy 3 constituency of the Chamber of Deputies and was finally elected. In 2013, Guerini endorsed Matteo Renzi in the 2013 leadership election, who appointed him, member of the national secretariat of the party, with the role of spokesman. In February 2014 he joined the newly appointed Prime Minister Renzi in carrying out institutional consultations for the formation of the new government.

On 14 June 2014, the PD national assembly approved Guerini's appointment as party's deputy secretary, along with Debora Serracchiani. Following the 2017 leadership election, they both ceased from office on 7 May 2017, replaced by Maurizio Martina. However, Guerini held a position within the party leadership, becoming coordinator of the national secretariat.

In the 2018 general election Guerini was re-elected in the Chamber of Deputies and on 18 July 2018 he was elected president of Parliamentary Committee for the Intelligence and Security Services and for State Secret Control (COPASIR), a body of the Italian Parliament deputed to survey and oversee the activities of the Italian intelligence agencies.

=== Minister of Defence ===
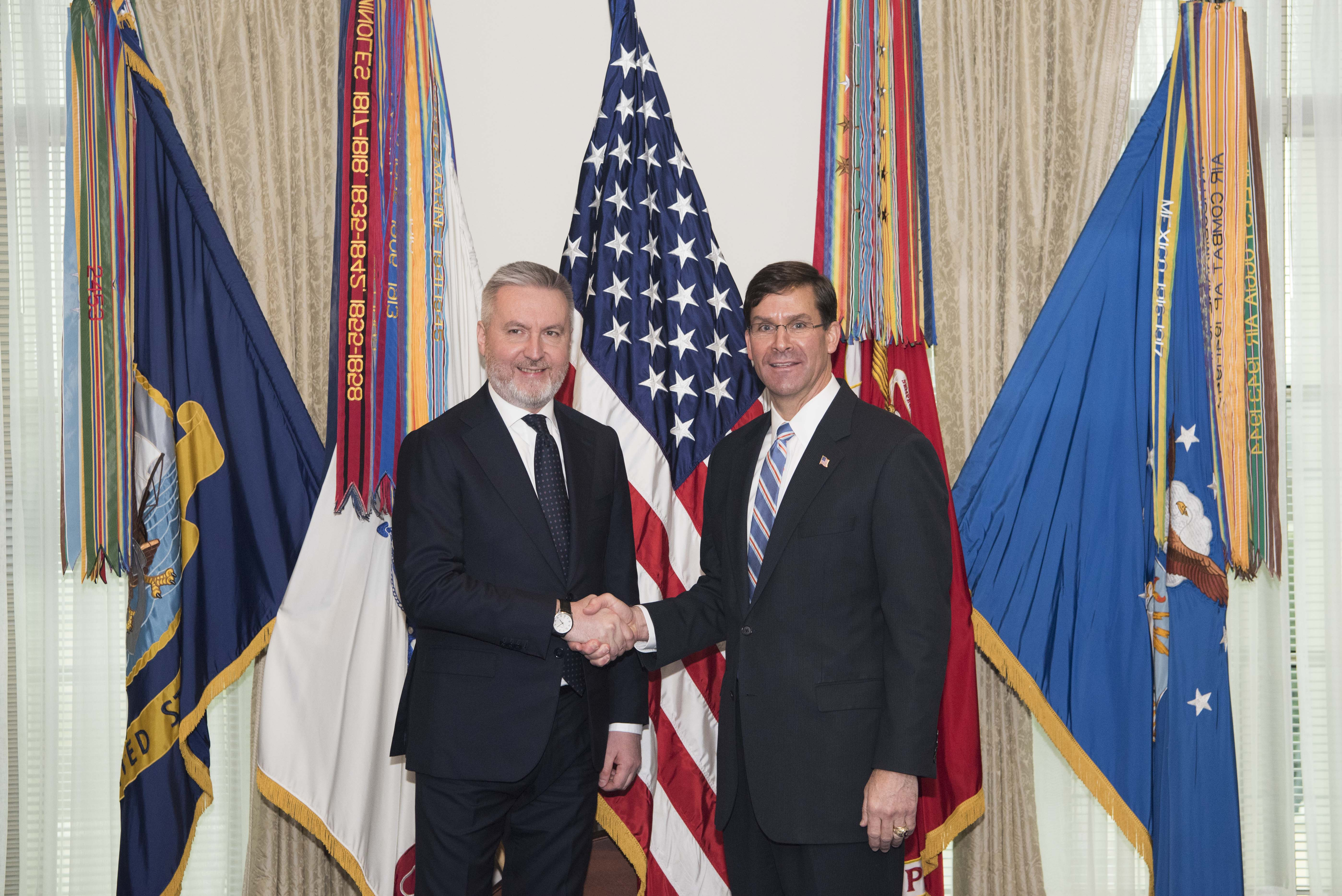
Guerini with U.S. Secretary of Defense Mark Esper in 2020

In August 2019 tensions grew within the populist government, leading to the issuing of a motion of no-confidence on Prime Minister Giuseppe Conte by the League. After Conte's resignation, the national board of the PD officially opened to the possibility of forming a new cabinet in a coalition with the M5S, based on pro-Europeanism, green economy, sustainable development, fight against economic inequality and a new immigration policy. The party also accepted that Conte may continue at the head of a new government, and on 29 August President Sergio Mattarella formally invested Conte to do so. On 5 September, Guerini was appointed new Minister of Defence.

In February 2021, Giuseppe Conte resigned as Prime Minister, following Italia Viva's withdrawal from the government. The former President of the European Central Bank, Mario Draghi, was invited by Italian President Sergio Mattarella to form a government of national unity. On 13 February, Guerini was confirmed as Minister of Defence.

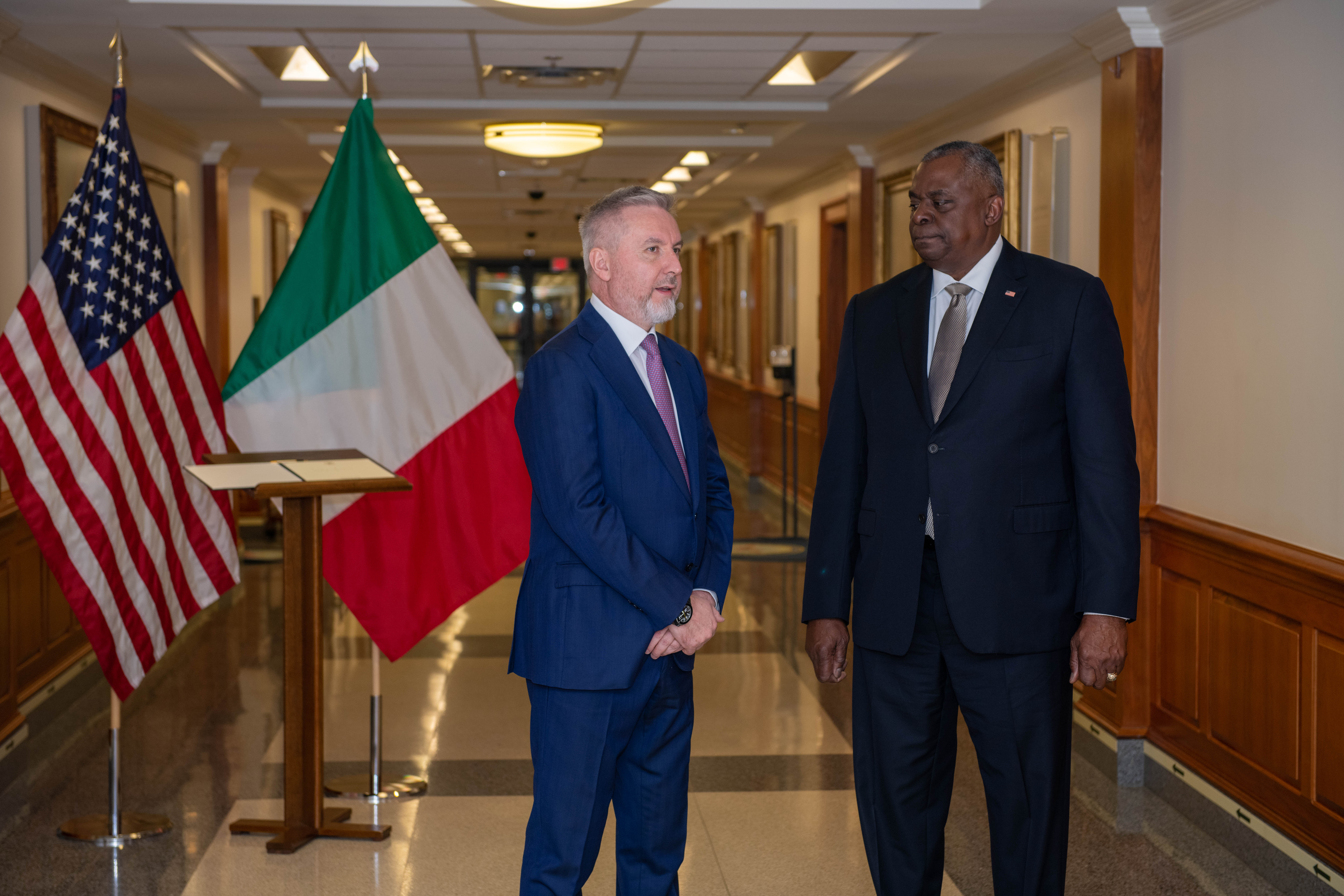
Guerini with U.S. Secretary of Defense Lloyd Austin in 2022

Shortly after taking office in 2019, Guerini announced that the Italian government would press ahead with an investment program for Lockheed Martin F-35 Lightning II fighter jets. In 2021, he backed the involvement of shipbuilder Fincantieri in the sale of Leonardo’s OTO Melara and Whitehead Sistemi Subacquei units, in an effort to safeguard what the Italian government considers strategic assets. Moreover, under his ministry, in June 2020, the Space Operation Command (COS) was officially founded. The COS is a joint space command of the Italian Armed Forces, which operates military satellites of Italy. With the establishment of COS, Italy became the tenth country in the world to have a space command.

As minister, Guerini had to oversee the NATO withdrawal from Afghanistan. In August 2021, following the Taliban offensive, the Italian government took part in the evacuation from Kabul. Within the Operation "Aquila Omnia", nearly 5,000 Afghans were evacuated by the Italian Armed Forces and brought to Italy.

In 2022, the budget for military expenditures reached a new all-time record, with 25.82 billion euro (nearly 30 billion dollars) planned by the government.

On 11 February 2022, amid the prelude to the Russian invasion of Ukraine, during a meeting in Riga with his Latvian counterpart, Artis Pabriks, Guerini called for "a constructive dialogue" with Russia to ease tensions. On 13 February, the Italian government declared to be ready to deploy 1,000 soldiers on NATO's Eastern border. Following the Russian invasion of Ukraine, Guerini was among the strongest supporters of sending military aids to Ukraine; however, he always stressed that a no fly zone over Ukraine was not a viable option. On 3 March, he described the Ukrainian people as "heroes", adding that Putin acted as an "arrogant" leader. On 16 March, in response to growing tensions with Russia, the Chamber of Deputies voted to increase military budget to 2% of GDP, a move firmly advocated by Guerini himself. On 19 March, Alexei Paramonov of the Russian Ministry for Foreign Affairs attacked Guerini, describing him as a war hawk and as an "inspirer of an anti-Russian campaign".

=== After the government ===
The 2022 general election was won by the right-wing coalition led by Giorgia Meloni, who became the new prime minister. On 6 December 2022, Guerini, who was re-elected to the Chamber of Deputies, was appointed president of COPASIR, a position that he already held between 2018 and 2019.

== Electoral history ==
Election	House	Constituency	Party	Votes	Result
2013	Chamber of Deputies	Lombardy 3	PD	– (Note: Elected in a closed list proportional representation system.)	Elected
2018	Chamber of Deputies	Lombardy 4	PD	–	Elected
2022	Chamber of Deputies	Lombardy 4	PD	–	Elected
