= Artemio Strazzi =

Italian politician (1921–2013)

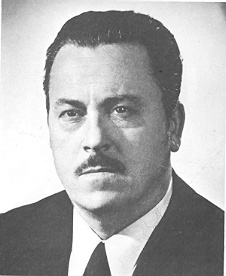
Artemio Strazzi

Artemio Strazzi (14 November 1921 – 19 April 2013) was an Italian politician who served as Mayor of Ancona in 1964, President of the Province of Ancona in 1970 and Deputy in the 6th Legislature (1972–1976).
