= Valeria Mancinelli =

Italian politician

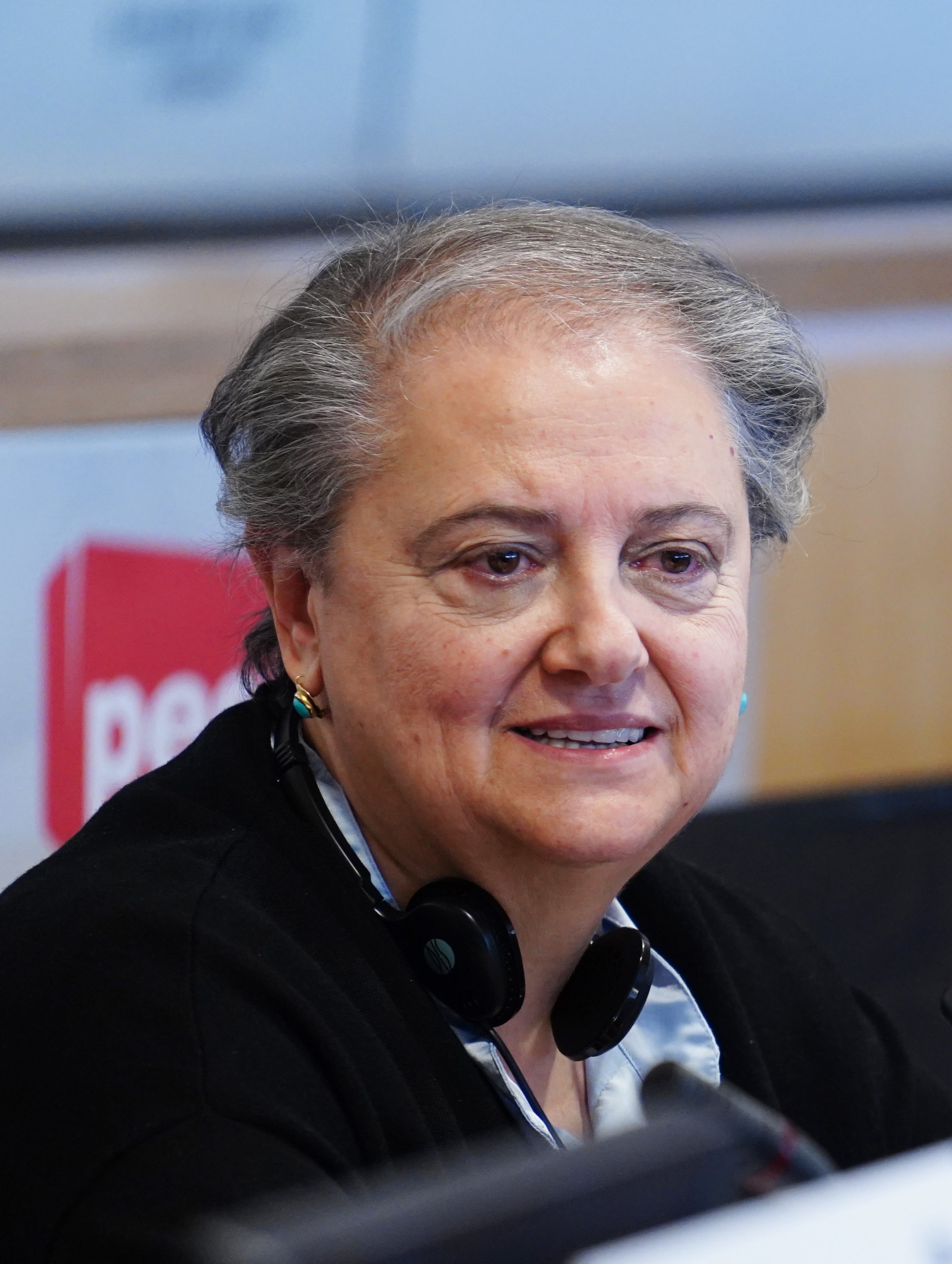

Member of the Regional Council of Marche
- Incumbent
- Assumed office 6 October 2025

Mayor of Ancona
- In office 11 June 2013 – 30 May 2023
- Preceded by: Fiorello Gramillano
- Succeeded by: Daniele Silvetti

Personal details
- Born: 13 March 1955 (age 71) Ancona, Italy
- Party: PCI (1988-1991); PDS (1991-1998); DS (1998-2007); PD (since 2007)
- Education: University of Macerata
- Profession: lawyer

Valeria Mancinelli (born 13 March 1955) is an Italian politician.

She is a member of the Democratic Party. Mancinelli was elected Mayor of Ancona on 11 June 2013 and re-confirmed for the second term on 25 June 2018. She is the first woman to be elected mayor of the city of Ancona.

In 2018, she won the World Mayor Prize.

== See also ==
- 2013 Italian local elections
- 2018 Italian local elections
- List of mayors of Ancona

Political offices
Preceded by Fiorello Gramillano	Mayor of Ancona; 2013-2023	Succeeded by Daniele Silvetti
