= Marche Polytechnic University =

University in Ancona, Italy

Coordinates: 43.6173°N 13.5127°E

- Università Politecnica delle Marche
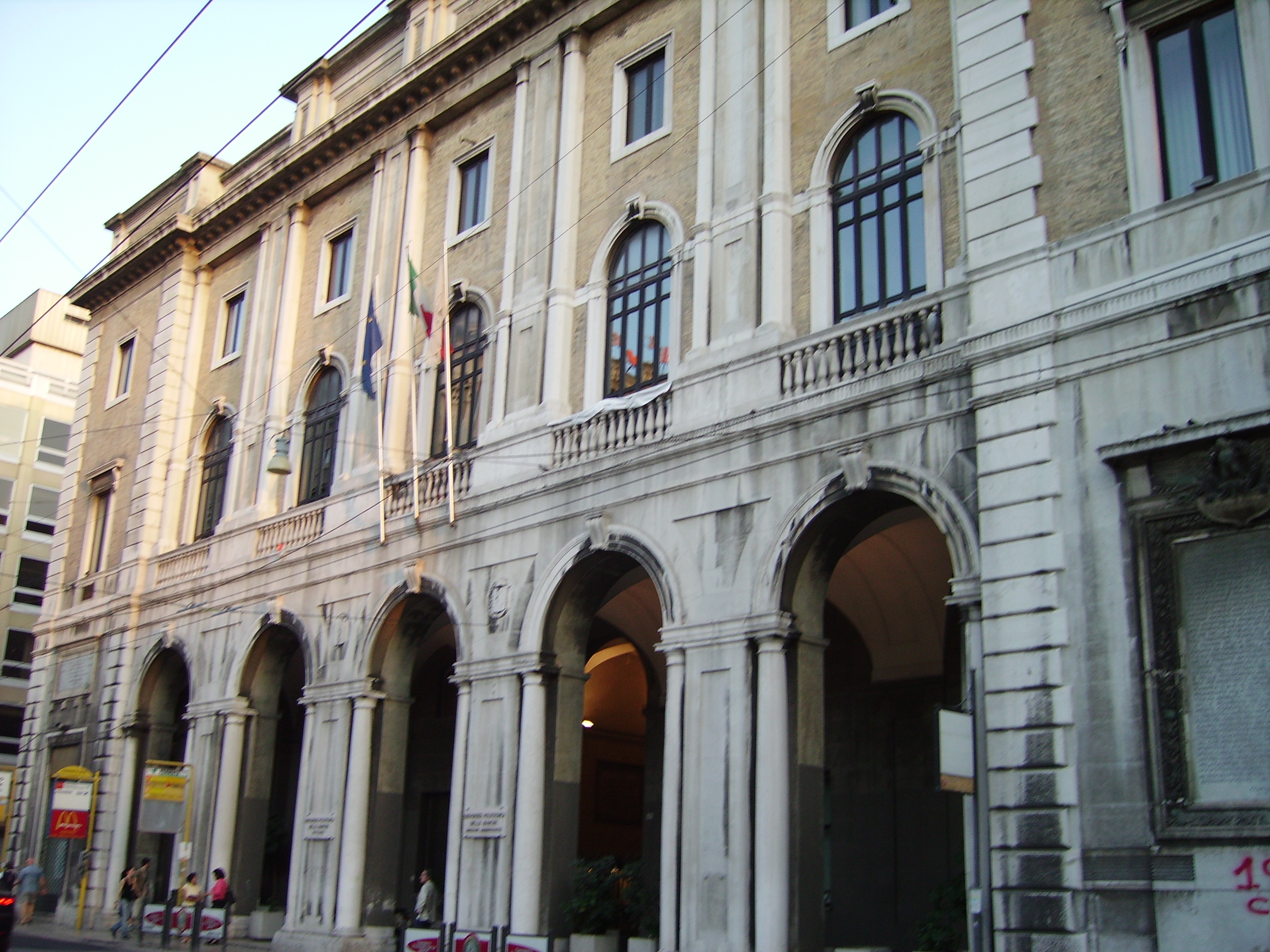
- Marche Polytechnic University building
- Type: State-supported
- Established: 1969
- Rector: Prof. Gian Luca Gregori
- Academic staff: 710
- Administrative staff: 560
- Students: 17,500
- Undergraduates: 16,400
- Postgraduates: 1,000
- Doctoral students: 400
- Location: Ancona, Italy
- Sports teams: CUS Ancona (http://www.cusancona.it/)
- Website: www.unipm.it/

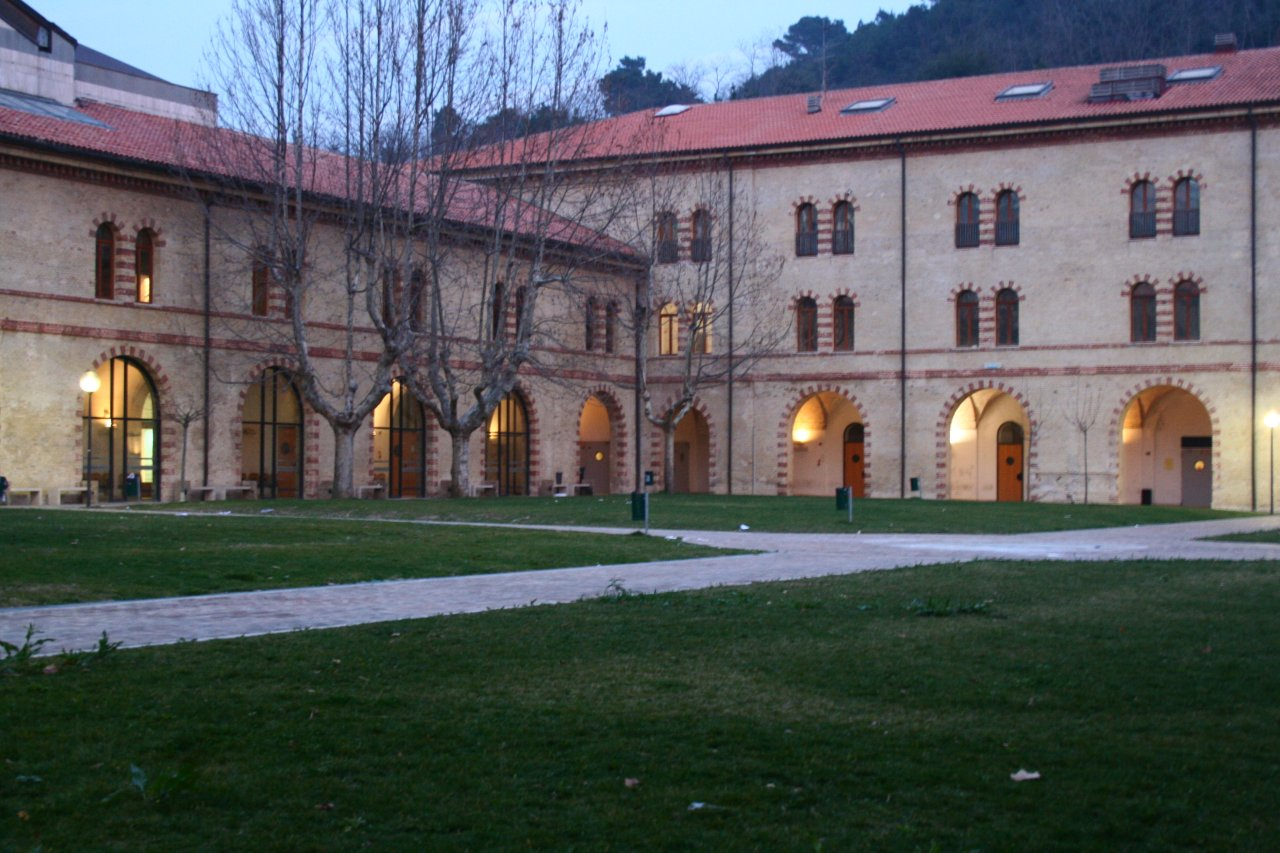
Headquarters of the Faculty of Economics

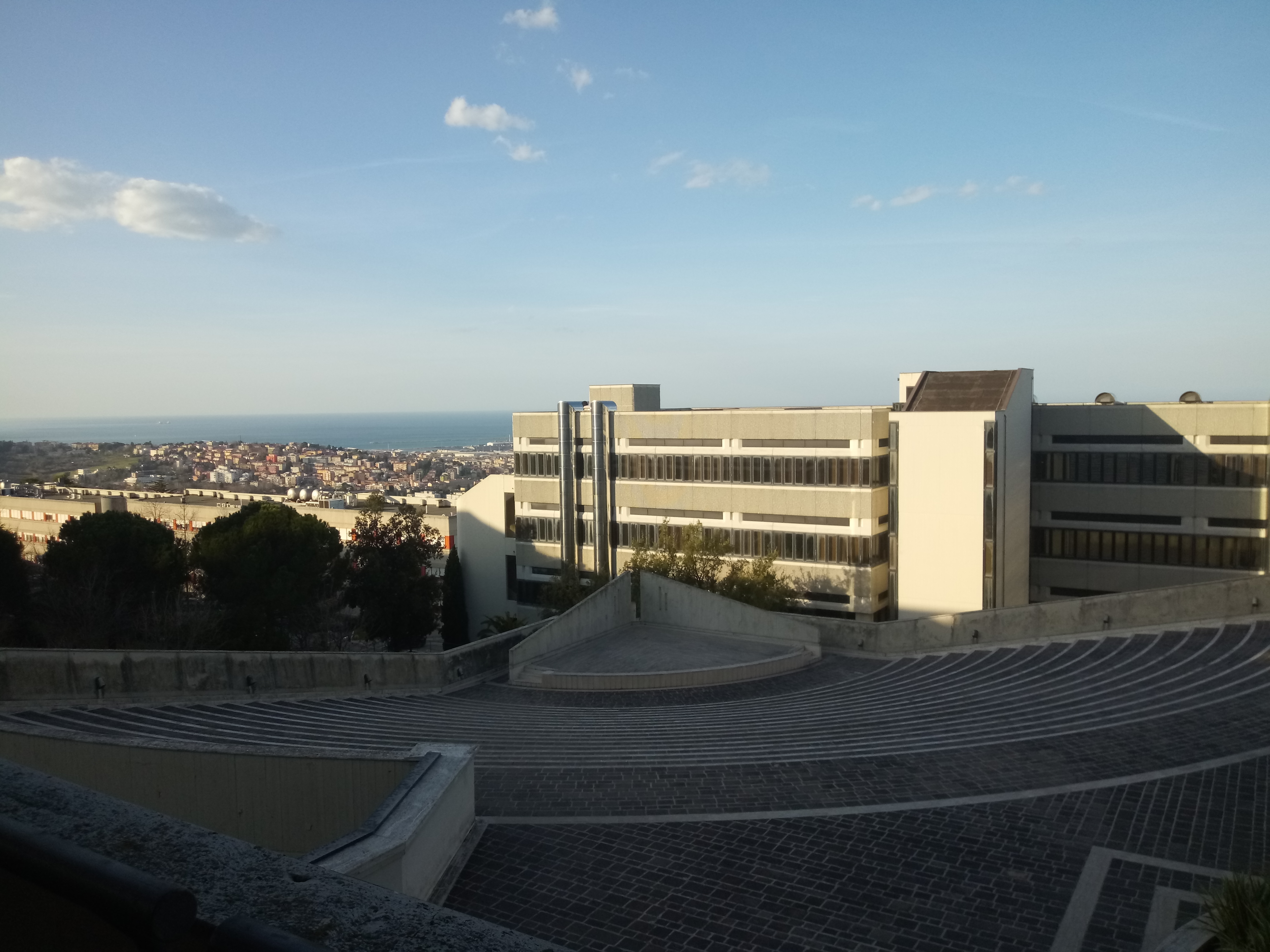
Headquarters of the Faculty of Engineering

Marche Polytechnic University or Polytechnic University of the Marches (Italian Università Politecnica delle Marche) is a public university in Ancona, Italy. It offers undergraduate and graduate degrees in Agriculture, Engineering, Economics, Medicine and Biology.

It was established in 1969 for research and education in various fields, including engineering, economics, medicine, and agriculture.

UNIVPM offers undergraduate and graduate programs, including bachelor's and master's degrees in engineering, economics, architecture, medicine, and agriculture.The university is structured into five main schools, including Engineering, Economics, Medicine and Surgery, Agriculture, and Sciences, reflecting its multidisciplinary academic focus.

== Academics ==
The teaching faculty currently numbers 710 teaching staff, along with 560 technical and administrative personnel. These are the 5 schools in which the university is divided into:

- School of Agriculture
- School of Economics
- School of Engineering
- School of Medicine and Surgery
- School of Sciences

== List of Rectors ==
- Alfredo Trifogli (Government Commissioner, 1969–1971)
- Giancarlo Castiglioni (1971–1974)
- Salvatore Occhipinti (1974–1976)
- Felice Santagata (1976–1979)
- Franco Angeleri (1980–1983)
- Paolo Bruni (1983–1992)
- Guido Bossi (1992–1997)
- Marco Pacetti (1997–2013)
- Sauro Longhi (2013–2019)
- (2019–present)

== See also ==
- List of Italian universities
- List of universities in Europe founded after 1945
