= Ranucci =

Ranucci is an Italian surname that may refer to:

- Christian Ranucci (1954–1976), French criminal
- Renato Rascel (born Renato Ranucci; 1912–1991), Italian actor and singer
- Sante Ranucci (1933–2023), Italian cyclist
- Sigfrido Ranucci (born 1961), Italian journalist
- Stefano Ranucci (born 1963), Italian politician
