= Scarcella =

Scarcella is a surname of Italian origin. Notable people with the surname include:

- Ilaria Scarcella (born 1993), Italian swimmer
- Louis N. Scarcella (born 1951), American police detective
- Pietro Scarcella (born 1950), Italian-Canadian mobster
- Sebastiano Scarcella (born 1925), Italian rector and jurist

== See also ==
- Scarsella
