= Puoti =

Puoti is an Italian surname. Notable people with the surname include:

- Basilio Puoti (1782–1847), Italian literary critic, lexicographer, and grammarian
- Giovanni Puoti (born 1944), Italian rector and politician
