= List of presidents of the Province of Terni =

President of the Province of Terni
- Presidente della Provincia di Terni

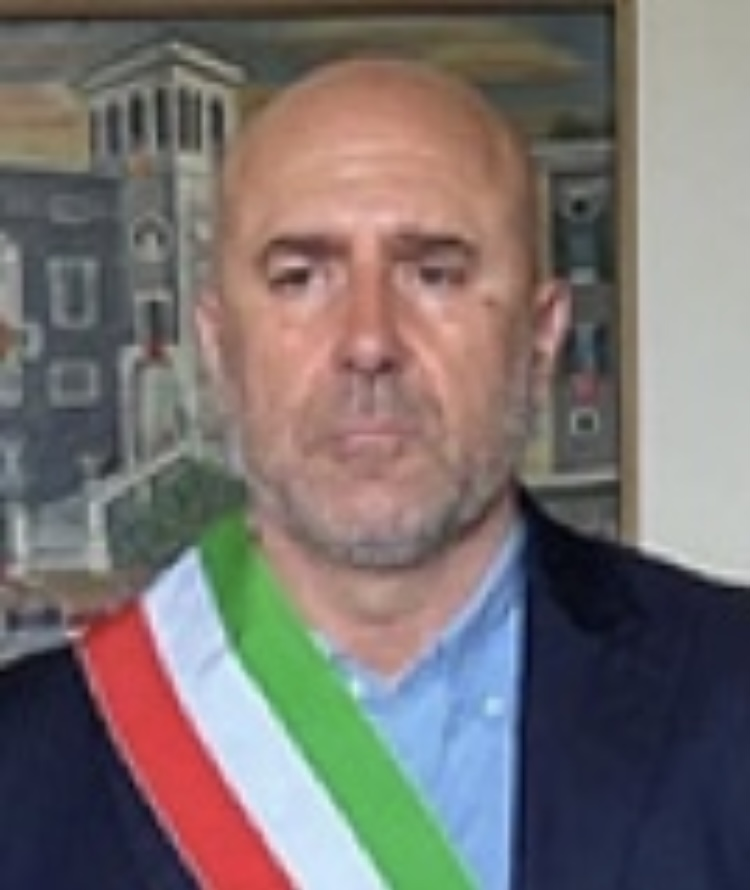
- Incumbent; Stefano Bandecchi since 31 March 2025
- Term length: 4 years
- Inaugural holder: Giovanni Santini
- Formation: 1927

The president of the Province of Terni is the head of the provincial government in Terni, Umbria, Italy. The president oversees the administration of the province, coordinates the activities of the municipalities, and represents the province in regional and national matters.

Since March 2025, the office has been held by Stefano Bandecchi.

== History ==
The Province of Terni was established in 1927 by the Fascist government. Local autonomy had been abolished and provincial administrations were placed under central control, with appointed officials replacing elected presidents.

After the establishment of the Italian Republic, the office was restored and the president was again elected by the Provincial Council starting from 1952. In 1995, a reform introduced the direct election of the president by popular vote. The Province of Terni was eventually reformed in 2014 under national legislation on provinces, with its functions reduced in favour of the Umbria region and local municipalities.

== List ==
=== Presidents of the Provincial Rectorate (1929–1944) ===
Nº	Portrait	Name	Term of office		Party
Nº	Portrait	Name	Start	End	Party
1		Giovanni Santini	1929	1929	National Fascist Party
2		Cesare Pressio Colonnese	1930	1934	National Fascist Party
3		Mariano Cittadini	1934	January 1936	National Fascist Party
–		Giuseppe Grimaldi	January 1936	November 1936	Extraordinary Commissioner
4		Ascanio Marchini	November 1936	1943	National Fascist Party

=== Presidents of the Provincial Deputation (1944–1952) ===
Nº	Portrait	Name	Term of office		Party
Nº	Portrait	Name	Start	End	Party
1		Pietro Tentoni	October 1944	1945	Italian Socialist Party
2		Arduino Pellegrini	9 May 1945	1952	Unitary Socialist Party

=== Presidents of the Province (1952–present) ===
Nº	Portrait	Name	Term of office		Party
Nº	Portrait	Name	Start	End	Party
1		Rutilio Robusti	1952	1960	Italian Socialist Party
2		Fabio Fiorelli	1960	1970	Italian Socialist Party
3		Mario Dominici	1970	1980	Italian Socialist Party
4		Bruno Capponi	1980	1985	Italian Socialist Party
5		Zefferino Cerquaglia	23 July 1985	17 October 1989	Italian Socialist Party
6		Stefano Moretti	17 October 1989	23 July 1990	Italian Socialist Party
7		Luciano Costantini	23 July 1990	20 January 1992	Italian Communist Party; Democratic Party of the Left
8		Alberto Provantini	20 January 1992	23 April 1995	Democratic Party of the Left
9		Nicola Molè	24 April 1995	14 June 1999	Social Christians; Democrats of the Left
10		Andrea Cavicchioli	14 June 1999	23 June 2004	Italian Democratic Socialists; Italian Socialist Party
10		Andrea Cavicchioli	23 June 2004	8 June 2009	Italian Democratic Socialists; Italian Socialist Party
11		Feliciano Polli	8 June 2009	13 October 2014	Democratic Party
12		Leopoldo Di Girolamo	13 October 2014	10 November 2016	Democratic Party
13		Giampiero Lattanzi	10 November 2016	9 January 2017	Independent (centre-left)
13		Giampiero Lattanzi	9 January 2017	20 December 2021	Independent (centre-left)
14		Laura Pernazza	20 December 2021	28 December 2024	Independent (centre-right)
–		Francesco Maria Ferranti (acting)	28 December 2024	31 March 2025	Forza Italia
15		Stefano Bandecchi	31 March 2025	Incumbent	Popular Alternative; Dimensione Bandecchi

== Sources ==
- Covino, Renato (1999). Dal decentramento all'autonomia. La Provincia di Terni dal 1927 al 1997. Terni: Provincia di Terni.
- "La provincia nell'ordinamento dello Stato Italiano" (in Italian). Provincia di Terni. Archived from the original on 2018-10-16.
- "Storia amministrativa dell'ente". Ministero dell'Interno.
