= Paolo Raffaelli =

Italian politician and Journalist

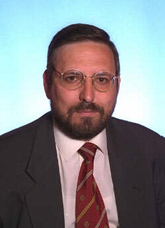

Mayor of Terni
- In office 14 June 1999 – 23 June 2009
- Preceded by: Gianfranco Ciaurro
- Succeeded by: Leopoldo Di Girolamo

Member of the Senate
- In office 15 April 1994 – 10 September 1999
- Constituency: Terni

Personal details
- Born: 1 August 1953 (age 72) Terni, Umbria, Italy
- Party: Democratic Party
- Occupation: Journalist

Paolo Raffaelli (born 1 August 1953) is an Italian politician and journalist.

== Biography ==
Paolo Raffaelli was born in Terni, Italy in 1953. He is married and has one son. He completed university studies in economics and political science.

Raffaelli is member of the Democratic Party. He served as mayor of Terni from 1999 to 2009.

He started professional journalism in 1988.

He was elected at the Senate of the Republic from 1994 to 1999 for two legislatures (XII, XIII).

He was also president of National Association of Italian Municipalities Umbria from 2007 to 2009. He resigned from the Chamber in September 1999.

He returned to work as a journalist in the editorial staff of the RAI regional TG for Umbria.

== See also ==
- List of mayors of Terni

Political offices
Preceded by Gianfranco Ciaurro	Mayor of Terni; 13 June 1999—21 June 2009	Succeeded by Leopoldo Di Girolamo
