= Dante Sotgiu =

Italian politician

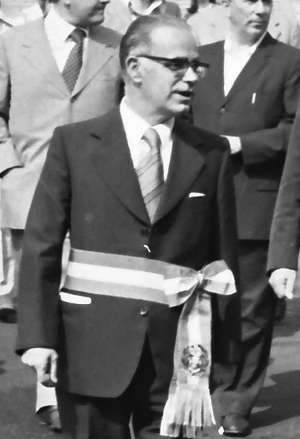

Mayor of Terni
- In office 1970–1978
- Preceded by: Ezio Ottaviani
- Succeeded by: Giacomo Porrazzini

Personal details
- Born: 31 May 1917 Terni, Umbria, Italy
- Died: 16 December 2003 (aged 86) Terni, Umbria, Italy
- Party: Italian Communist Party
- Occupation: politician

Dante Sotgiu (31 May 1917 – 16 December 2003) was an Italian politician.

He was born in Terni, Italy in 1917 and died in Terni in 2003 at the age of 86.

He was member of the Italian Communist Party and was elected mayor of Terni in 1970. He served as mayor from 1970 to 1978. He was a councilor for several years.

He was a young officer of the Royal Italian Army. The municipality of Terni named a square in his memory.

== See also ==
- List of mayors of Terni

Political offices
Preceded by Ezio Ottaviani	Mayor of Terni; 1970—1978	Succeeded by Giacomo Porrazzini
