= Nicola Molè =

Italian lawyer and politician (1931–2023)

President of the Province of Terni
- In office 1995–1999
- Preceded by: Alberto Provantini
- Succeeded by: Andrea Cavicchioli

Personal details
- Born: 26 February 1931 Polia, Italy
- Died: 17 January 2023 (aged 91) Terni, Italy
- Party: CS; DS
- Education: Sapienza University of Rome
- Occupation: Lawyer

Nicola Molè (26 February 1931 – 17 January 2023) was an Italian lawyer and politician. A member of the Social Christians and the Democrats of the Left, he served as president of the Province of Terni from 1995 to 1999.

Molè died in Terni on 17 January 2023, at the age of 91.
