= Università degli Studi Niccolò Cusano =

Online university in Rome, Italy

Coordinates: 41°54′46″N 12°23′36″E

Niccolò Cusano University
- Università degli Studi Niccolò Cusano
- Motto: Mens ingenii verbum
- Type: Private, online
- Established: 10 May 2006
- President: Giovanni Puoti
- Rector: Prof. Fabio Fortuna
- Students: 1324
- Location: Rome, Italy
- Campus: Online and urban
- Website: www.unicusano.it

The Niccolò Cusano University (Italian: Università degli Studi Niccolò Cusano), often simply abbreviated as UNICUSANO is a private for-profit online university founded in 2006 in Rome, Italy.

== History ==
The Niccolò Cusano University was founded by Stefano Bandecchi. The university is named after the Roman Catholic cardinal, scientist and astronomer, Nicholas of Cusa (in Italian Niccolò Cusano). Until 9 July 2012, the university was located in Via Casalmonferrato and Via Don Orione. The university Cusano also has a publishing company the Edizioni Edicusano and a foundation for medical research – scientific Fondazione Niccolò Cusano. In 2013 a Faculty of Engineering and Psychology has been established. It provides e-learning courses, counting 94 centers.

== Organization ==
=== Programs ===
The university offers degree programs in education sciences, law, political science, economics, engineering, psychology.

=== Campus ===
The school is accredited as online university, but it also has a campus in Rome.

==== University buildings ====
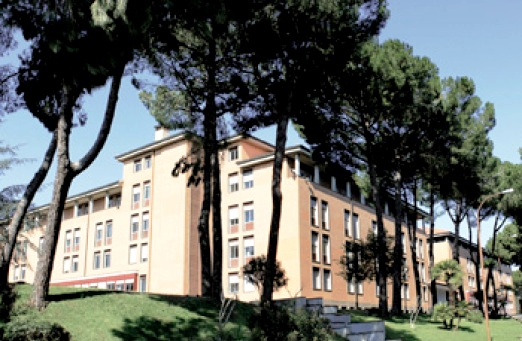
Nicholas of Cusa University (Campus)

The Campus is located in Via don Carlo Gnocchi, 3 – 00166 Rome. In the building there are multimedia classrooms, a theater and sports facilities.

==== Library ====
There is a library, both traditional and electronic (to the virtual library, which students can access at any time).

==== Dormitories ====
Unicusano University provides off-campus students with about 400 places in dorms.

==== Research Center ====
Inside the campus is also located the research centre of the Nicholas of Cusa University.

==== Radio ====
The school's radio station, Radio Cusano Campus, broadcasts from the campus.

== Presidents and rectors ==
=== Presidents ===
- Giovanni Iacono (2006–2012)
- Stefano Ranucci (2012-2015)
- Giovanni Puoti (2015–present)

=== Rectors ===
The Rector is the highest academic authority.

- Sebastiano Scarcella (2006–2010)
- Giovanni Puoti (2010–2013)
- Fabio Fortuna (from 1 October 2013)

== Notable professors ==
- Maurizio Costanzo
- Giovanni Puoti
- Fabio Fortuna

== See also ==
- Ternana Calcio
