= Ezio Ottaviani =

Italian politician and teacher

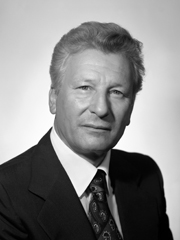

Mayor of Terni
- In office 1958–1970
- Preceded by: Emilio Secci
- Succeeded by: Dante Sotgiu

Member of the Senate
- In office 1976–1983

Personal details
- Born: 1 February 1919 Norcia, Italy
- Died: August 1986 (aged 67) Norcia, Italy
- Party: Italian Communist Party
- Occupation: teacher

Ezio Ottaviani (1 February 1919 – August 1986) was an Italian politician and teacher.

He was a member of the Italian Communist Party. He served as Mayor of Terni from 1958 to 1970. He was a municipal councilor in Norcia.

He was a school teacher and he moved to Terni after World War II and joined the Italian Communist Party at young age.

He was elected to the Senate of the Republic from 1976 to 1983 for two legislative terms (VI, VIII). The municipality of Terni named a square in his memory. He was also Councilor of the Region of Umbria.

== Biography ==
Ezio Ottaviani was born in Norcia, Italy in 1919 and died in Norcia in 1986 at the age of 67.

== See also ==
- List of mayors of Terni

Political offices
Preceded by Emilio Secci	Mayor of Terni; 1958—1970	Succeeded by Dante Sotgiu
