= Fabio Fortuna =

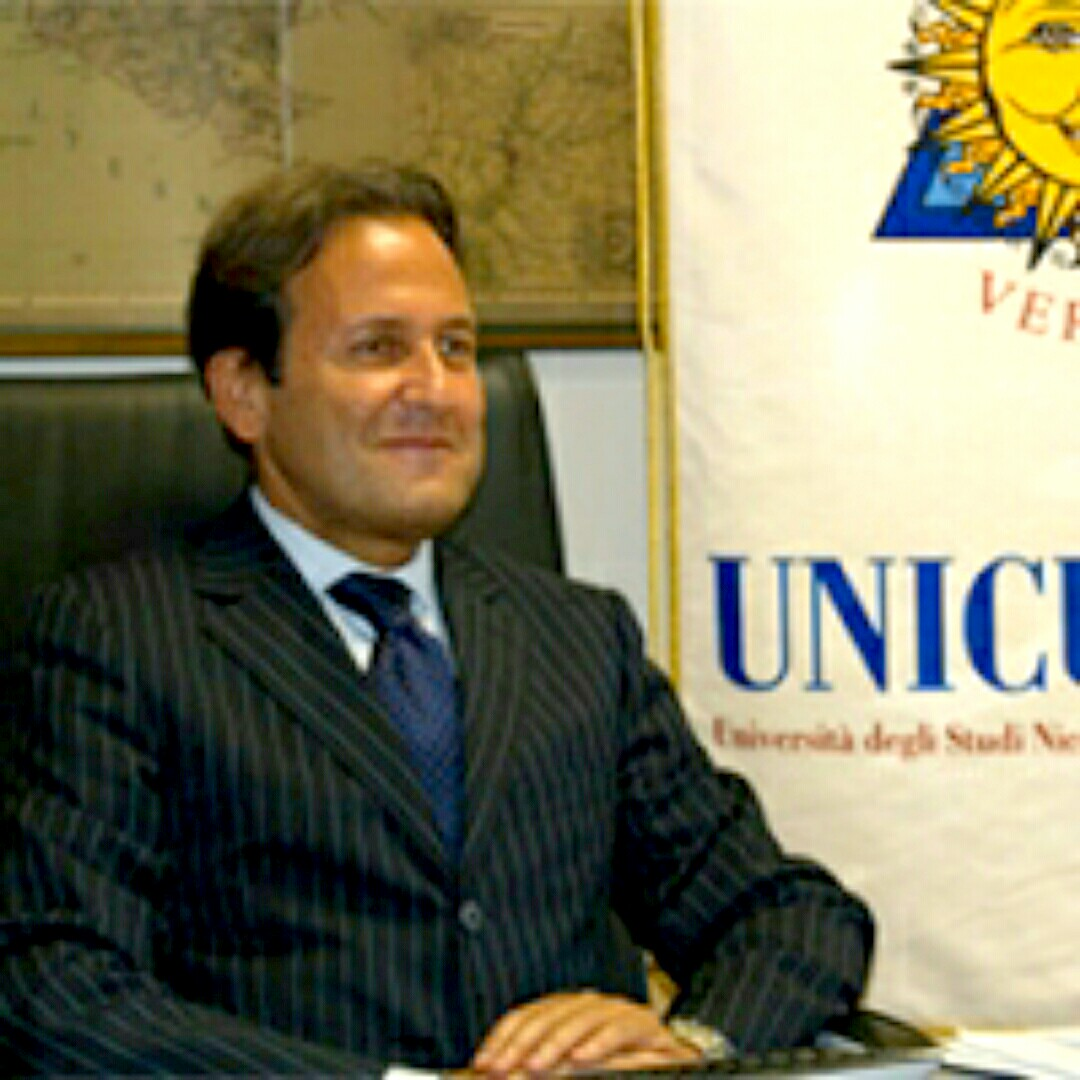
Fortuna in 2016

Fabio Fortuna (born Rome 22 January 1960) is an Italian academic and economist. He is the rector of the Università degli Studi Niccolò Cusano.

== Life ==
Fortuna was born in Rome. From October 2013 he is rector of the Università degli Studi Niccolò Cusano. He was vice Rector and Dean of the Faculty of Economics of Niccolò Cusano University of Rome, where he teaches Accounting and Financial Reporting; he was also teaches "Auditing" at Luiss University of Rome and he is member of the Advisory Board of the "Accademia Italiana di Economia Aziendale" (AIDEA). Fortuna is member of the Advisory Board of the "Dean Conference of the Economics and Statistics Faculties" and he is member of several Editorial Boards and Scientific Committees. He is the President of the "Associazione Nazionale Docenti di Ragioneria ed Economia Aziendale"(ASDORT). Ordinary member of the "Accademia italiana di Economia aziendale" (AIDEA), "Società Italiana dei Docenti di Ragioneria ed Economia Aziendale" (SIDREA), "Società Italiana di Storia della Ragioneria" (SISR) e "European Accounting Association" (EAA). He published many books and articles dealing with Accounting and Business Administration.

== Publications ==
- Business model of dependent firms. The Italian case, in Atti del convegno Aidea 2013, Lecce, Italia, 2013 con E. Di Carlo e S. Testarmata.
- Considerations on the financial crisis, management and external disclosure, in The 15th IAMB conference, Lisbon, Portugal, 2013, con P. Paoloni.
- Banks' Risk Management: From Business Function to Transversal Function, in The 14th IAMB conference, San Antonio Texas, 2013, con P. Paoloni.
- Corporate governance in the Italian Smes: Hypothesis of a model in The 13th IAMB conference, Bali, 2012, con P. Paoloni.
- Problematiche di risk management nelle banche e impatto sul sistema economico in Rivista Italiana di Ragioneria e di Economia aziendale, n. 9 -10, settembre - ottobre 2011, Rirea.
- Editoriale in Rivista Italiana di Ragioneria e di Economia aziendale, n. 7–8, luglio - agosto 2010, Rirea.
- Avviamento e quota di pertinenza della minoranza azionaria: le indicazioni del Revised IFRS 3 in Rivista Italiana di Ragioneria e di Economia aziendale, n. 11–12, novembre - dicembre 2009, Rirea.
- Crisi finanziaria, management e comunicazione esterna d’impresa: alcune considerazioni in Rivista Italiana di Ragioneria e di Economia aziendale, n. 9 -10, settembre - ottobre 2009, Rirea.
- L’evoluzione dell’informativa di settore prevista nell’IFRS 8: alcune riflessioni in Rivista Italiana di Ragioneria e di Economia aziendale, n. 5 - 6, maggio - giugno 2008, Rirea.
- Dall’informativa strategie di settore in Il Sole 24 Ore, n. 179, 2 luglio 2007.
- Dimensione aziendale ed efficienza: il caso delle aziende di credito in Rivista Italiana di Ragioneria e di Economia aziendale, n. 7–8, luglio - agosto 1993, Rirea.
- Economie di dimensione e banche minori in Economia e diritto del Terziario, n. 2, 1993.
- Corso di ragioneria per gli istituti tecnico - commerciali indirizzo amministrativo, Le Monnier - Il Sole 24 Ore Scuola (volume I - Ragioneria generale; volume II - Ragioneria applicata e pubblica; volume III - Ragioneria applicata e professionale)
- Corso di ragioneria ed economia aziendale per gli istituti tecnico - commerciali indirizzo programmatori, Le Monnier - Il Sole 24 Ore Scuola così articolato (volume I - corso di ragioneria ed economia aziendale I; volume II - corso di ragioneria ed economia aziendale II; volume III - corso di ragioneria ed economia aziendale III)
- Corso di economia aziendale per gli indirizzi IGEA e Mercurio, Le Monnier - Il Sole 24 Ore Scuola (volume I - corso modulare di economia aziendale I; volume II - corso modulare di economia aziendale II; volume III - corso modulare di economia aziendale III; volume IV - corso modulare di economia aziendale IV; volume V - corso modulare di economia aziendale V)
- Corso di economia aziendale per gli istituti professionali, Le Monnier (volume I - Moduli di economia aziendale I; volume II - moduli di economia aziendale II; volume III - moduli di economia aziendale III; volume IV - moduli di economia aziendale IV; volume V - moduli di economia aziendale V)
- Corso di economia aziendale per il biennio degli istituti tecnico - commerciali, Le Monnier (Volume I - in azienda; volume II - in azienda)
- Corso di economia aziendale compatto per il triennio degli istituti tecnico - commerciali, Le Monnier (volume III - corso modulare di economia aziendale; volume IV corso modulare di economia aziendale; volume V corso modulare di economia aziendale)
- Corso di economia aziendale per il biennio degli istituti professionali, Le Monnier (volume I - in azienda; volume II - in azienda)
- Corso di economia aziendale per gli istituti tecnico - commerciali, Le Monnier (volume I, II, III, IV, V - con noi in azienda)
- Corso di economia aziendale per il primo biennio degli istituti tecnico - commerciali, Le Monnier(volume I, II - con noi in azienda plus)
- Corso di economia aziendale per il secondo biennio e l’ultimo anno degli istituti tecnico - commerciali edito, F. Le Monnier (volume III, IV, V - con noi in azienda plus)
- Corporate governance. Soggetti, modelli e sistemi, Franco Angeli, 2001
- I derivati sui crediti nell'economia e nel bilancio delle banche, Franco Angeli, 2002
- Il segmental reporting nel processo informativo d’impresa, Milano, FrancoAngeli, 2004
- Moduli di economia aziendale. Per gli Ist. professionali per i servizi commerciali vol.5, Mondadori Education, 2004
- Effetti di Basilea 2 sull'economia di banche e imprese, Franco Angeli, 2005
- L' informativa sui rischi nelle banche, Franco Angeli, 2010
- La corporate governance nell’esperienza nazionale e internazionale. Aspetti comparativi e profili evolutivi, Bologna, il Mulino, 2010
- Raccolta di norme per l'esame di Stato, Le Monnier scuola, 2012
- Raccolta di norme per l'esame di Stato. Con espansione online. Per gli Ist. Tecnici e professionali - Scuola & Azienda, 2013

== See also ==
- Università degli Studi Niccolò Cusano

Academic offices
Preceded by Giovanni Puoti	Rector of Università degli Studi Niccolò Cusano from 1° October 2013	Succeeded by –
