= Scarsella =

Scarsella may refer to:

== Surname ==
It is an Italian surname. Notable people with the surname include:

- Basil Scarsella (born 1955), Australian businessman
- Fabio Scarsella (born 1989), Italian footballer
- Ippolito Scarsella (1550/1551–1620), also known as Scarsellino, Italian painter
- Les Scarsella (1913–1958), American baseball player

== Architecture ==
- Scarsella, an architectural element

== See also ==
- Scarcella
