= Leopoldo Di Girolamo =

Italian politician (born 1951)

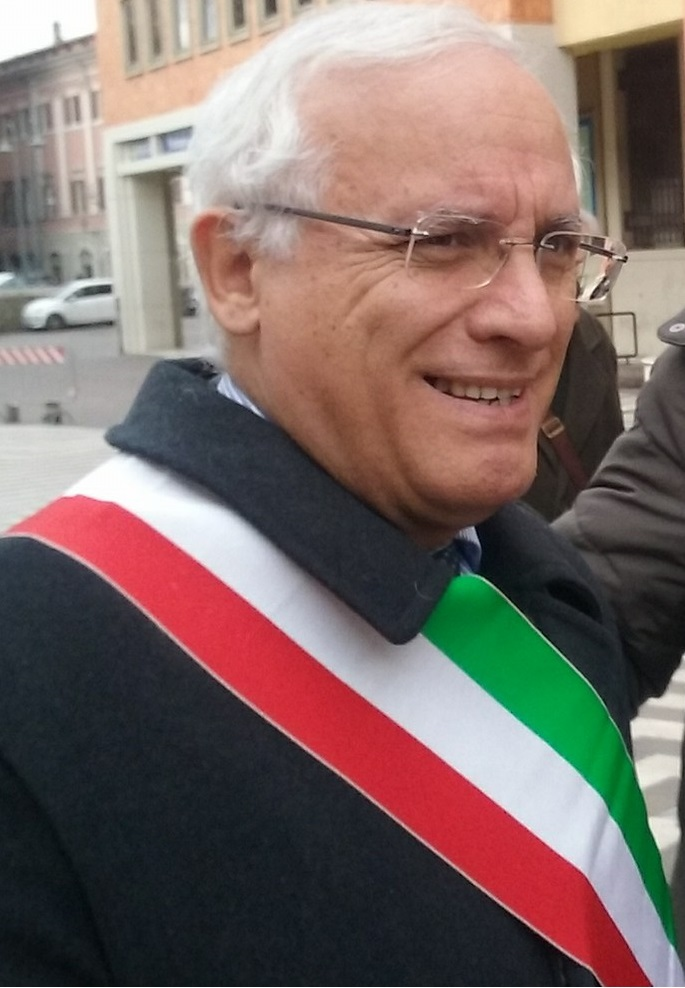

Mayor of Terni
- In office 23 June 2009 – 20 February 2018
- Preceded by: Paolo Raffaelli
- Succeeded by: Leonardo Latini

President of the Province of Terni
- In office 13 October 2014 – 13 October 2016
- Preceded by: Feliciano Polli
- Succeeded by: Giampiero Lattanzi

Member of the Senate
- In office 2008–2009
- In office 2001–2006

Member of the Chamber of Deputies
- In office 2006–2008

Personal details
- Born: 11 August 1951 (age 74) Montorio al Vomano, Province of Teramo, Italy
- Party: Democratic Party of the Left (1991-1998); Democrats of the Left (1998-2007); Democratic Party (since 2007)
- Profession: Physician

Leopoldo Di Girolamo (born 11 August 1951) is an Italian politician of the Democratic Party. He was elected at the Senate of the Republic for two legislatures (XIV, XVI) and at the Chamber of Deputies for the XV legislature in 2006.

Di Girolamo served as mayor of Terni for two terms (2009-2018) and president of the Province of Terni from 2014 to 2016.

Political offices
Preceded by Paolo Raffaelli	Mayor of Terni; 2009–2018	Succeeded by Leonardo Latini
Preceded by Feliciano Polli	President of the Province of Terni; 2014–2016	Succeeded by Giampiero Lattanzi
