= Gianfranco Ciaurro =

Italian politician (1929–2000)

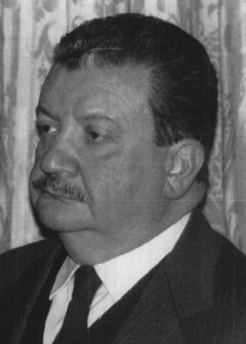

Mayor of Terni
- In office 20 June 1993 – 7 February 1999
- Preceded by: Mario Todini
- Succeeded by: Paolo Raffaelli

Personal details
- Born: 6 April 1929 Terni, Umbria, Italy
- Died: 29 November 2000 (aged 71) Rome, Lazio, Italy
- Party: Italian Liberal Party
- Occupation: politician

Gianfranco Ciaurro (6 April 1929 – 29 November 2000) was an Italian politician.

He was member of the Italian Liberal Party. He served as mayor of Terni from 1999 to 2009. Gianfranco Ciaurro was also councilor for the Municipality of Rome from 1991 to 1993.

He was Councilor of State and Minister for the Coordination of Community Policies and Regional Affairs of the Amato I Cabinet from 21 February 1993 to 28 April 1993.

He was appointed extensor of the minutes in 1985. He also elected deputy secretary general in 1988. He also received the solidarity of Silvio Berlusconi. He was Secretary General of the President of the Chamber of Deputies from 1988 to 1989.

== Biography ==
Gianfranco Ciaurro was born in Terni, Italy in 1929 and died in Rome in 2000 at the age of 71. He was also the grandson of Ilario Ciaurro. He studied at the University of Perugia.

== Honors and awards ==
- —Order of Merit of the Italian Republic-2 August 1989

- —Order of Merit of the Italian Republic-1 June 1978

== See also ==
- List of mayors of Terni

Political offices
Preceded by Mario Todini	Mayor of Terni; 20 June 1993—7 February 1999	Succeeded by Paolo Raffaelli
