= Stefano Ranucci =

- Born: 13 February 1963 (age 63); Rome, Italy
- Occupation: President of Università degli Studi Niccolò Cusano

Stefano Ranucci (born 1963, Rome, Italy) is an Italian manager and president of the Università degli Studi Niccolò Cusano.

== Biography ==
Ranucci is president of the Università degli Studi Niccolò Cusano. From 2010 is part of the political party Italian Union Movement - MUI. He was general manager of Iberia airline (Italy and Malta), Vastours (Corte Ingles) and Ristonova srl.

== Controversies ==
In 2021, Ranucci's team made the headlines for the mass firing of unionized employees and for controversial episodes of firings followed by sudden re-hiring of the same employees, which resulted in employees coming to work on days that were not covered by regular contracts.

In 2023, an investigation was opened on Ranucci and his associates (Stefano Bandecchi, Giovanni Puoti, and Fabio Stefanelli), citing false tax declarations. According to the prosecutors of the revenue agency, tax-free money deriving from Università Nicolò Cusano were diverted into for-profit businesses, which the team managed using the University as a source of non-taxable income.

== See also ==
- Fondazione Niccolò Cusano
