= Leonardo Latini =

Italian politician and lawyer

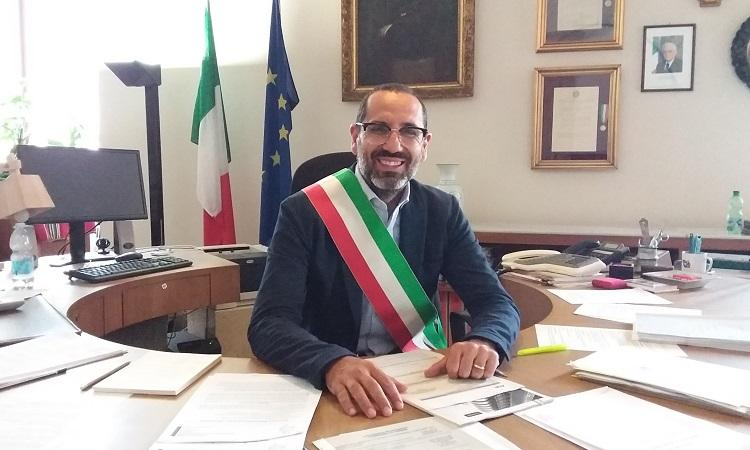

Mayor of Terni
- In office 26 June 2018 – 31 May 2023
- Preceded by: Leopoldo Di Girolamo
- Succeeded by: Stefano Bandecchi

Personal details
- Born: 14 June 1974 (age 52) Terni, Umbria, Italy
- Party: Lega Nord
- Education: University of Perugia
- Profession: Lawyer

Leonardo Latini (born 14 June 1974) is an Italian politician and lawyer.

He is a member of the right-wing populist party Lega Nord. Latini was elected Mayor of Terni on 24 June 2018 and took office on 26 June.

== See also ==
- 2018 Italian local elections
- List of mayors of Terni

Political offices
Preceded by Leopoldo Di Girolamo	Mayor of Terni; 2018-2023	Succeeded by Stefano Bandecchi
