= List of mayors of Terni =

Mayor of Terni
- Sindaco di Terni

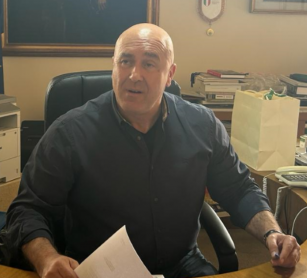
- Incumbent; Stefano Bandecchi since 31 May 2023
- Appointer: Popular election
- Term length: 5 years, renewable once
- Formation: 1861
- Website: Official website

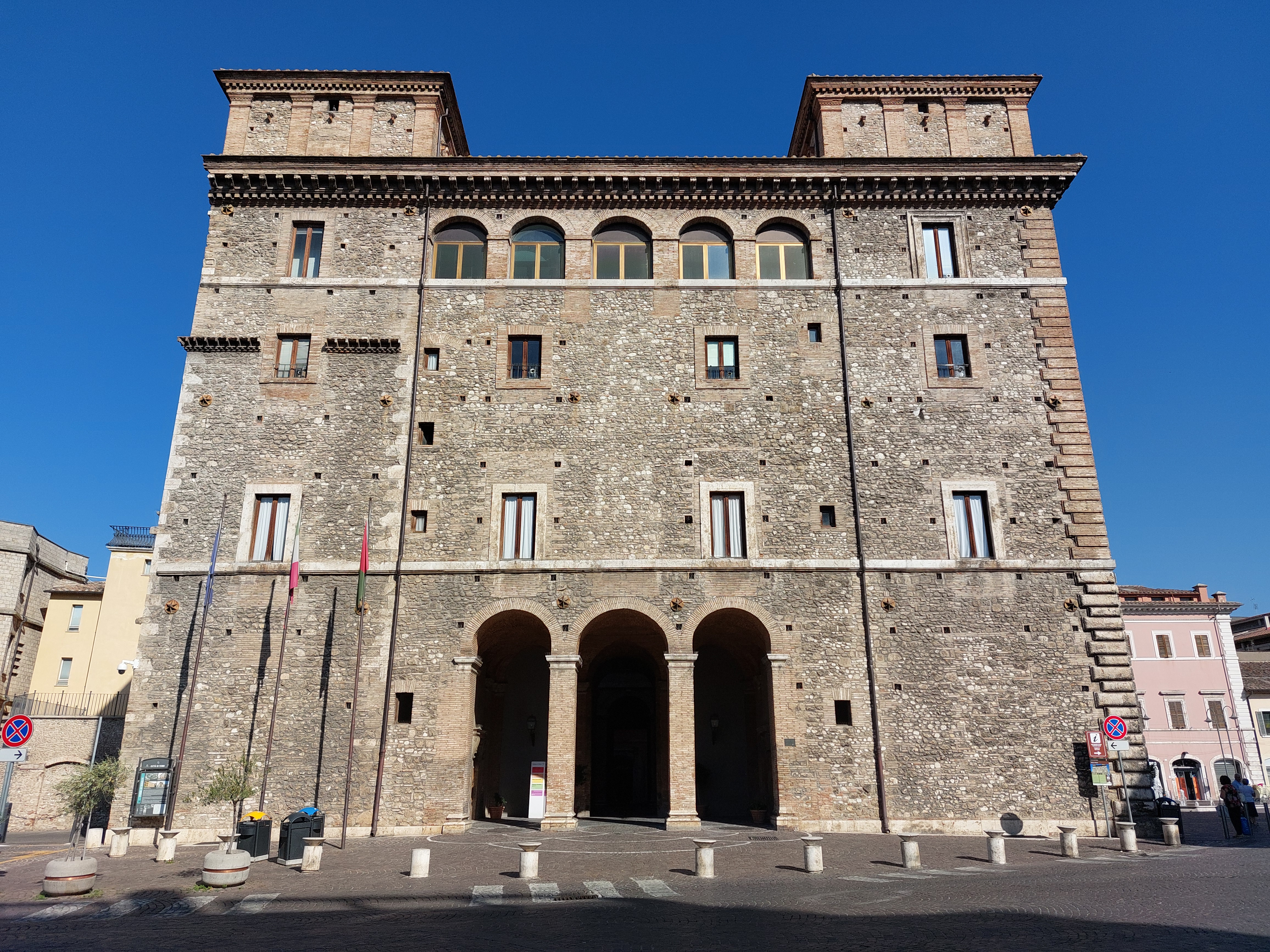
Terni's Town Hall.

The mayor of Terni is an elected politician who, along with the Terni City Council, is accountable for the strategic government of Terni in Umbria, Italy.

The current mayor is Stefano Bandecchi (AP), who took office on 31 May 2023.

== Overview ==
According to the Italian Constitution, the mayor of Terni is member of the City Council.

The mayor is elected by the population of Terni, who also elect the members of the City Council, controlling the mayor's policy guidelines and able to enforce his resignation by a motion of no confidence. The mayor is entitled to appoint and release the members of his government.

Since 1993 the mayor is elected directly by Terni's electorate: in all mayoral elections in Italian cities with a population higher than 15,000 the voters express a direct choice for the mayor or an indirect choice voting for the party of the candidate's coalition. If no candidate receives at least 50% of votes, the top two candidates go to a second round after two weeks. The election of the City Council is based on a direct choice for the candidate with a preference vote: the candidate with the majority of the preferences is elected. The number of the seats for each party is determined proportionally.

== Italian Republic (since 1946) ==
=== City Council election (1946-1993) ===
From 1946 to 1993, the mayor of Terni was elected by the City Council.

	Mayor	Term start	Term end	Party
1	Comunardo Morelli	1946	1948	PCI
2	Luigi Michiorri	1948	1955	PCI
3	Emilio Secci	1955	1958	PCI
4	Ezio Ottaviani	1958	1970	PCI
5	Dante Sotgiu	1970	1978	PCI
6	Giacomo Porrazzini	1978	1990	PCI
7	Mario Todini	1990	1993	PSI

=== Direct election (since 1993) ===
Since 1993, under provisions of new local administration law, the mayor of Terni is chosen by direct election, originally every four, then every five years.

	Mayor of Terni	Took office	Left office	Party	Coalition	Election
8	Gianfranco Ciaurro (1929–2000)	20 June 1993	12 May 1997	Ind; FI	Ind	1993
8	Gianfranco Ciaurro (1929–2000)	12 May 1997	7 February 1999 (Note: Resigned.)	Ind; FI	Pole for Freedoms (FI-AN)	1997
Special Prefectural Commissioner tenure (7 February 1999 – 14 June 1999)
9	Paolo Raffaelli (b. 1953)	14 June 1999	14 June 2004	DS; PD	The Olive Tree (DS-PPI-SDI-PdCI-PRC)	1999
9	Paolo Raffaelli (b. 1953)	14 June 2004	23 June 2009	DS; PD	The Olive Tree (DS-DL-SDI-PdCI-PRC)	2004
10	Leopoldo Di Girolamo (b. 1951)	23 June 2009	10 June 2014	PD	PD • FdS • IdV • SEL	2009
10	Leopoldo Di Girolamo (b. 1951)	10 June 2014	20 February 2018 (Note: Resigned.)	PD	PD • SEL	2014
Special Prefectural Commissioner tenure (20 February 2018 – 26 June 2018)
11	Leonardo Latini (b. 1974)	26 June 2018	31 May 2023	Lega	Lega • FI • FdI	2018
12	Stefano Bandecchi (b. 1961)	31 May 2023	Incumbent	AP	AP • NM • Italexit and right-wing lists	2023
