= Giovanni Puoti =

Italian rector and politician

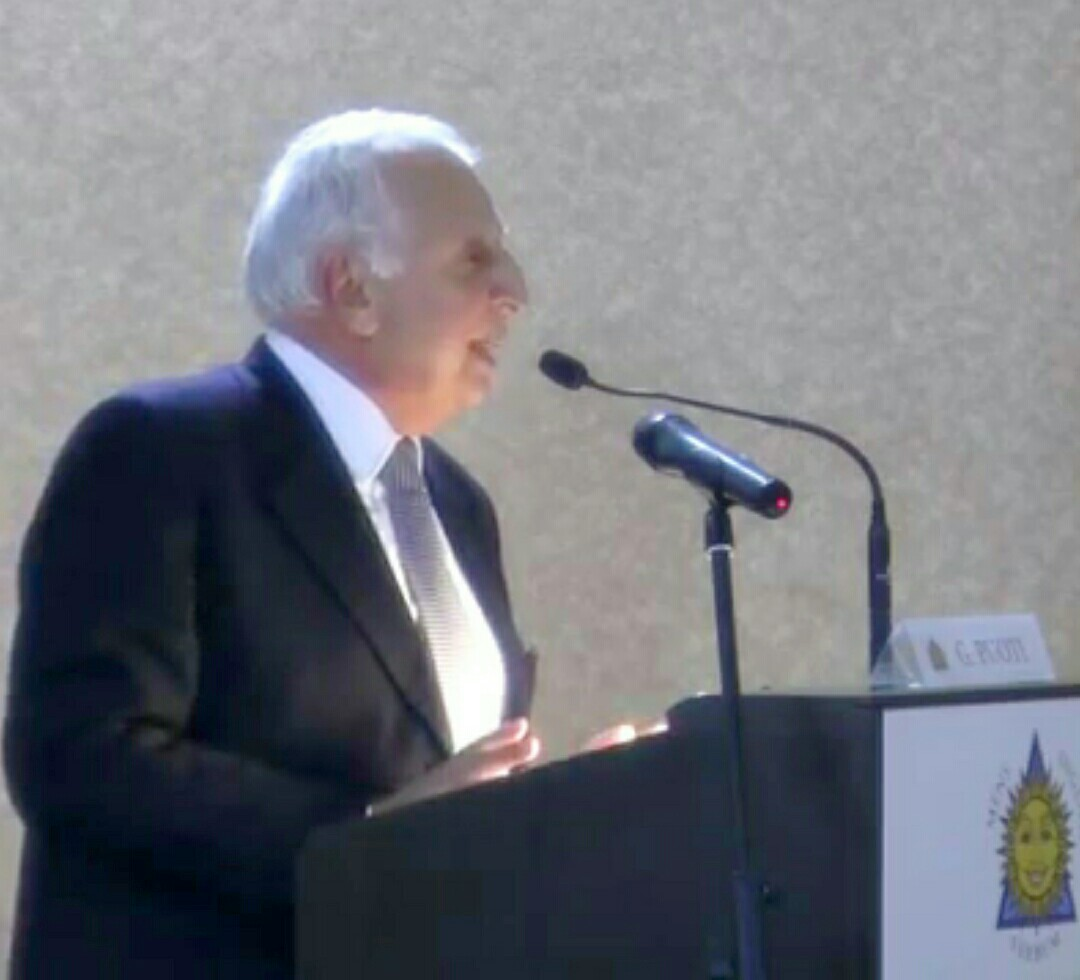
Giovanni Puoti

Giovanni Puoti (born July 20, 1944) is an Italian rector, politician, and professor of tax law.

== Biography ==
Puoti was born in Rome. In 1966, he graduated M.Law at Sapienza University of Rome. Later (1968–1973) he became administrative law judge. In October 1973 he was awarded a position as chair professor at Sapienza (Faculty of Economics). Between 1976 and 1993 he collaborated with Treccani (one of Italy's major encyclopedias) to start a series of issues on legal concepts. His political career was marked by his appointment as deputy minister in the government of Lamberto Dini (1995–1996). Concurrently, he began working permanently in academia: first, as chair professor of law at University of Macerata (1980–1986), Sapienza University of Rome (1986–2011), and finally at Università degli Studi Niccolò Cusano. At the latter, he became rector (2010–2013). Eventually (2016–2023), he intermittently acted as legal representative of the same university; when not in charge, he covered the role of vice-chancellor. In 2019, he was appointed president of the Niccolò Cusano Foundation for biomedical research.

== Legal affairs (revenue law) ==
Following an investigation carried out by public prosecutors Stefano Pesci and Valentina Margi, between January 19 and January 23, 2023, Guardia di Finanza (Italy's law enforcement agency belonging to the Ministry of Economy and Finance) carried out a precautionary seizure of 20 million euros against Università degli Studi Niccolò Cusano, which is an anticipatory measure for the presumed crime of tax evasion. As a consequence, Puoti was placed under investigation, together with Stefano Bandecchi and Stefano Ranucci, who took turns as legal representatives of the university from 2016 to 2023. The appeal was rejected by the court of first and second instance, which both confirmed the seizure citing the fact that Università degli Studi Niccolò Cusano had forfeited its social and educational nonprofit goals to pursue profit and, as such, was expected to pay IRES (the Italian corporate income tax). Notwithstanding such legal proceedings, Puoti retains his position as a member of the Ethical Committee of Rivista di Diritto Tributario Internazionale.

== Works ==
- Il lavoro dipendente nel diritto tributario, FrancoAngeli, 1975.
- Istruzione e prova nel procedimento d'imposizione, Veutro Editore, Roma, 1979.
- I tributi locali.Procedimenti sanzonatori e di riscossione coattiva. Impugnazione degli atti ed opposizioni, CEDAM, 2005 (with F. Simonelli, B. Cucchi).
- Diritto dell'esecuzione tributaria, CEDAM, 2007 (with B. Cucchi).
- I reati tributari, CEDAM, 2008 (with F. Simonelli).
- La nuova riscossione tributaria. Procedure esecutive e di notificazione, CEDAM, 2012 (with F. Simonelli, B. Cucchi) .

== See also ==
- Università degli Studi Niccolò Cusano
- Fondazione Niccolò Cusano

Academic offices
Preceded by Sebastiano Scarcella	Rector of Università degli Studi Niccolò Cusano; November 2010 - 2013	Succeeded by Fabio Fortuna
