= Sebastiano Scarcella =

- Born: 25 November 1925 (age 100); San Giovanni Rotondo, Italy

Sebastiano Scarcella (born 25 November 1925) is an Italian rector and jurist.

== Life ==
Rector of the Università degli Studi Niccolò Cusano from 2006 to November 2010.

He is honorary President of the Council of State (Italy).

Scarcella is presidente of the Fondazione Niccolò Cusano.

== Books ==
- Commento giuridico-sistematico dei decreti delegati sulla scuola, editore Rivista di diritto scolastico, 1979 (con Giovanni Trainito)
- Lo stato giuridico del personale della scuola: commento giuridico-sistematico del decreto delegato 31 maggio 1974, N. 417, Volume 2, editore Rivista di diritto scolastico, 1975 (con Giovanni Trainito)

== See also ==
- Università degli Studi Niccolò Cusano
- Fondazione Niccolò Cusano
- Italian Council of State

Academic offices
Preceded by -	Rector of Università degli Studi Niccolò Cusano; 2006 - 2010	Succeeded by Giovanni Puoti
