= Stefano Bandecchi =

Italian politician and entrepreneur

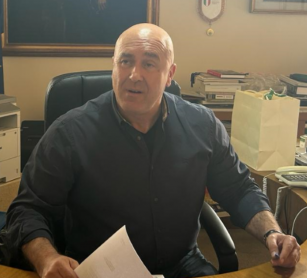

Mayor of Terni
- Incumbent
- Assumed office 31 May 2023
- Preceded by: Leonardo Latini

President of the Province of Terni
- Incumbent
- Assumed office 31 March 2025
- Preceded by: Laura Pernazza

Personal details
- Born: 4 April 1961 (age 65) Livorno, Italy
- Party: Dimensione Bandecchi (from 2025); Before: MSI (until 1995); FI (2005-2009); PdL (2009-2013); Ind. (2013-2017); AP (2017-2026)
- Profession: Entrepreneur

Stefano Bandecchi (born 4 April 1961) is an Italian politician and entrepreneur.

A member and coordinator of the centrist party Popular Alternative, he holds the office of Mayor of Terni since 2023.

He founded the Niccolò Cusano University in 2006 and has been president of Ternana Calcio since 2017.

In March 2025, Bandecchi was elected president of the Province of Terni.

== Controversy ==
=== Gaza remarks ===
In September 2025, Bandecchi sparked intense public and political backlash after posting on social media and speaking in video statements in which he addressed the war in the Gaza Strip and the deaths of children there. He declared: “20,000 children have never died” and added that in Gaza “childhood ends at nine years old, since the girls at that age are being raped,” further asserting that the children killed were in large part “soldiers of Hamas, not even wanted by the Palestinian Authority.”

He also affirmed his support for Israel and characterized the Palestinian state as “not the one governed by Hamas.”

The remarks drew immediate condemnation. Opposition politicians in Italy labelled the comments “repugnant” and “offensive.” Senator Walter Verini called the statements “repugnant and despicable”. Within the municipal government of the city of Terni (where Bandecchi is mayor), the capogruppo Roberta Trippini issued a formal communiqué stating that his words were “inhuman and offensive” and that she had left the majority group in the Municipal Council because of the language used.

On 29 September 2025, dozens of protesters gathered outside Terni’s city hall ahead of a council meeting to demand accountability for Bandecchi’s remarks. Inside the council session, opposition councillors abandoned the meeting in protest, while members of the centre-right also did not participate.

Earlier in the same month, Bandecchi had posted on Instagram quotes from Hamas’s founding statute and a video showing alleged executions by Hamas, in a post captioned that those protesting for Gaza were supporting “scum” that carried out summary executions, thereby escalating tensions.

In the aftermath of the controversy, a macabre symbol of protest was placed in front of the municipal building in Terni where a life-sized effigy of Bandecchi hanging upside down with a threatening message referencing one of his earlier videos. Bandecchi responded by calling the act “intimidation” and blamed the protest groups for adopting violent symbolism.

In the midst of the nationwide general strike for Gaza, he called those participating in the protests "Hamas terrorist and the government will treat them like terrorists".

Political offices
| Preceded by Leonardo Latini | Mayor of Terni since 2023 | Incumbent |
