= 2022 Italian general election in Trentino-Alto Adige/Südtirol =

- 25 September 2022

All 7 Trentino-Alto Adige/Südtirol seats in the Chamber of Deputies
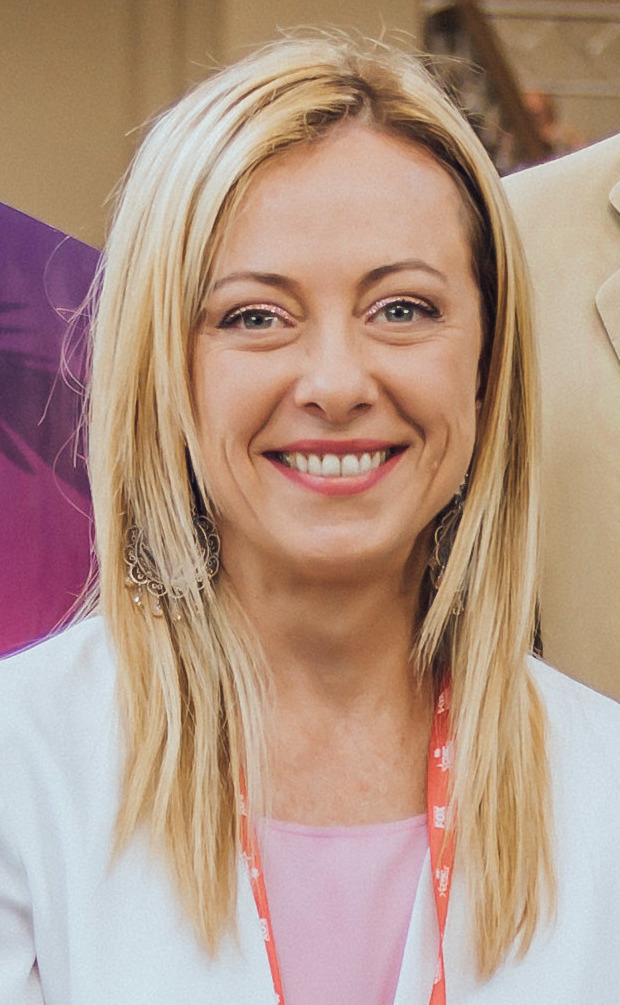

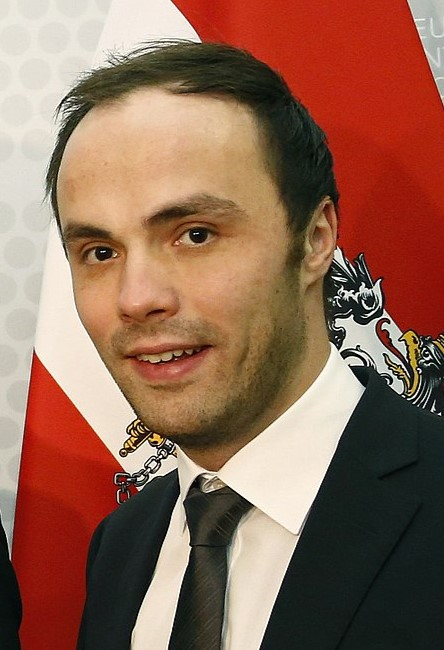

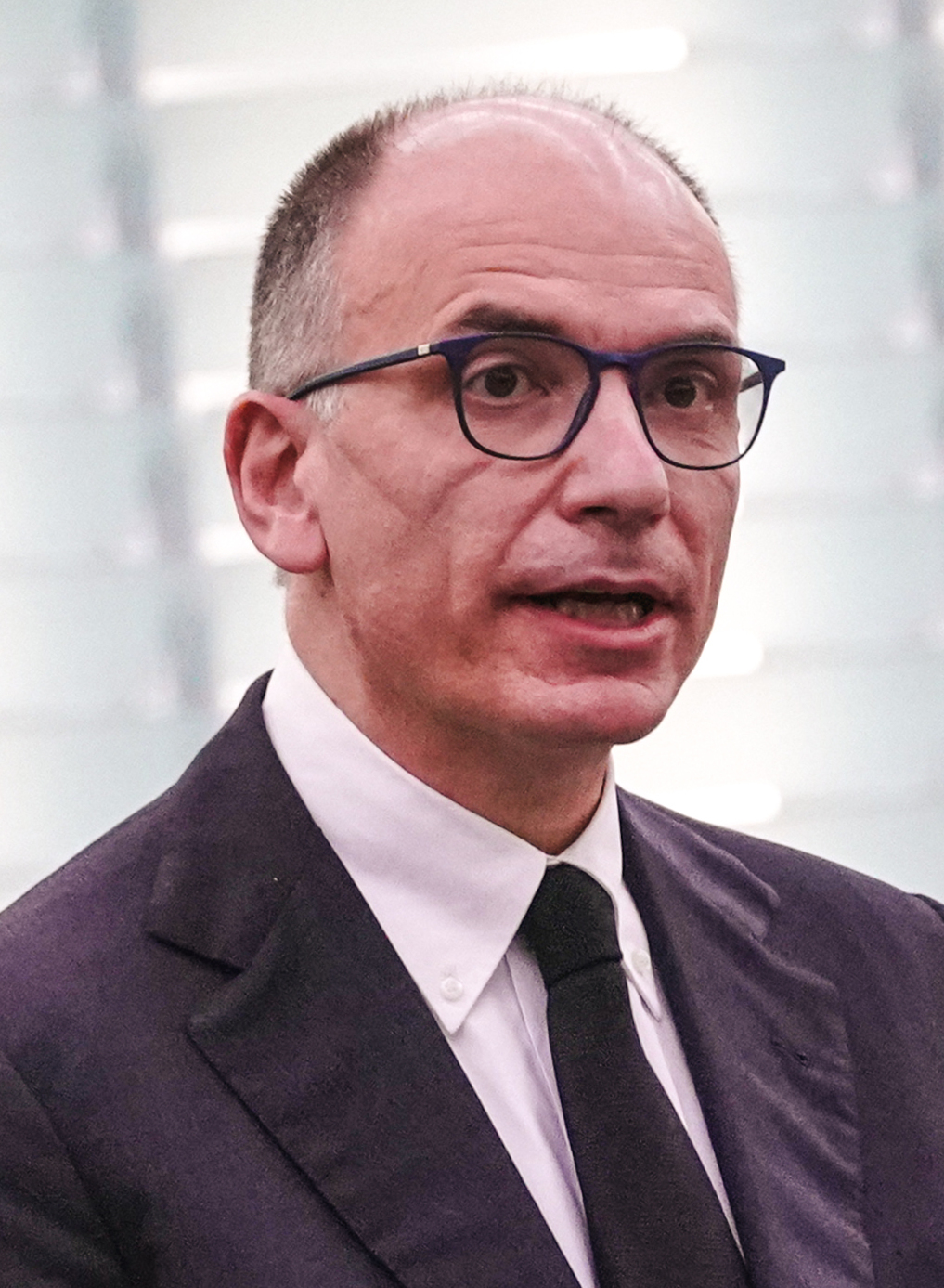
Leader	Giorgia Meloni	Philipp Achammer	Enrico Letta
Alliance	Centre-right	SVT–PATT	Centre-left
Seats before	5	4	1
Seats won	3	3	1
Seat change	▼2	▼1	Steady
Popular vote	157,622	117,010	132,938
Percentage	31.18%	23.15%	26.30%
Swing	▲1.88	▼1.05	▲7.10

The 2022 Italian general election took place on 25 September 2022. In Trentino-Alto Adige/Südtirol, 14 seats were up for election: 8 for the Chamber of Deputies and 6 for the Senate of the Republic.

== Background ==
Since the 2018 Italian general election, many changes started to occur in the Trentino-Alto Adige/Südtirol political landscape. For the first time since the 1996 Italian general election, the centre-right coalition managed to defeat the centre-left coalition in Trentino in a general election. Shortly thereafter, the Trentino Tyrolean Autonomist Party (PATT) decided to run separately (German: Blockfrei), leading to the first victory of the Maurizio Fugatti-led centre-right coalition in a provincial election in Trentino since the start of the Second Italian Republic with the 1994 Italian general election.

In South Tyrol, the traditionally dominant-party system led by the South Tyrolean People's Party (SVP) lost its majority in the 2013 Trentino-Alto Adige/Südtirol provincial elections. In the 2018 general election, the SVP and the Democratic Party of the centre-left coalition lost their majority, forcing SVP to form a coalition with Lega due to the ethnischer Proporz system (Italian: proporzionale etnica). In the 2019 European Parliament election in Trentino-Alto Adige/Südtirol, the SVP broke their traditional alliance with the PD and joined forces with the centre-right Forza Italia, due to their common affiliation with the European People's Party.

== Results ==
=== Full results ===
==== Chamber of Deputies ====
Coalition	Party	Proportional			First-past-the-post			Total seats
Coalition	Party	Votes	%	Seats	Votes	%	Seats	Total seats
Centre-right coalition	Brothers of Italy	94,824	18.76	1	157,622	31.18	1	2
Centre-right coalition	Lega (incl. LT, LAAST, Fassa)	16,302	11.84	0	157,622	31.18	1	1
Centre-right coalition	Forza Italia	6,582	4.78	0	157,622	31.18	0	0
Centre-right coalition	Us Moderates	987	0.72	0	157,622	31.18	0	0
Centre-left coalition	Democratic Party – Democratic and Progressive Italy	86,371	17.09	1	132,938	26.30	0	1
Centre-left coalition	Greens and Left Alliance (incl. Greens)	29,594	5.85	0	132,938	26.30	0	0
Centre-left coalition	More Europe (incl. Team K)	14,911	2.95	0	132,938	26.30	0	0
Centre-left coalition	Civic Commitment	2,062	0.41	0	132,938	26.30	0	0
SVP–PATT (incl. PT)		117,010	23.15	1	117,010	23.15	2	3
Action – Italia Viva		30,678	6.07	0	30,678	6.07	0	0
Five Star Movement		25,394	5.02	0	25,394	5.02	0	0
Vita (incl. Enzian)		22,331	4.42	0	22,331	4.42	0	0
Italexit		8,754	1.73	0	8,754	1.73	0	0
Sovereign and Popular Italy		6,426	1.27	0	6,426	1.27	0	0
People's Union		4,331	0.86	0	4,331	0.86	0	0
Total		505,484	100.00	3	505,484	100.00	4	7

Source: Ministry of the Interior

PR vote in Trentino

Party	Votes	%
Brothers of Italy	69,773	25.21
PD–IDP	61,760	22.31
Lega (incl. LT, Fassa)	30,978	11.19
Action – Italia Viva	23,540	8.50
Five Star Movement	16,686	6.03
SVP–PATT (incl. PT)	16,177	5.84
Forza Italia	12,813	4.63
Greens and Left Alliance	11,991	4.33
More Europe	9,695	3.50
Italexit	6,337	2.29
Vita	5,843	2.11
Sovereign and Popular Italy	5,093	1.84
People's Union	3,022	1.09
Us Moderates	2,006	0.72
Civic Commitment	1,096	0.40
Total	276,810	100.00
Valid votes	276,810	95.30
Invalid/blank votes	13,648	4.70
Total votes	290,458	100.00
Registered voters/turnout	417,154	69.63
Source: Ministry of the Interior

PR vote in South Tyrol

Party	Votes	%
SVP–PATT	100,833	44.09
Brothers of Italy	25,051	10.95
PD–IDP	24,611	10.76
Greens and Left Alliance (incl. Greens)	17,603	7.70
Vita (incl. Enzian)	16,488	7.21
Lega (incl. LAAST)	12,130	5.30
Five Star Movement	8,708	3.81
Action – Italia Viva	7,138	3.12
More Europe (incl. Team K)	5,216	2.28
Forza Italia	4,116	1.80
Italexit	2,417	1.06
Sovereign and Popular Italy	1,333	0.58
People's Union	1,309	0.57
Civic Commitment	966	0.42
Us Moderates	755	0.33
Total	228,674	100.00
Valid votes	228,674	93.28
Invalid/blank votes	16,462	6.72
Total votes	245,136	100.00
Registered voters/turnout	393,852	62.24
Source: Ministry of the Interior

==== Senate of the Republic ====
Party	Votes	%	Seats
Centre-right	137,015	27.24	2
SVP–PATT (incl. PT)	116,003	23.06	2
CB – +E – AVS – PD–IDP – A–IV	100,602	20.00	1
Five Star Movement	28,355	5.64	–
PD–IDP – +E – AVS	21,894	4.35	1
Vita (incl. Enzian)	17,876	3.55	–
AVS (incl. Greens)	17,574	3.49	–
ISP	15,252	3.03	–
Die Freiheitlichen	14,479	2.88	–
Team K	11,157	2.22	–
PD–IDP	9,612	1.91	–
Action – Italia Viva	6,782	1.35	–
UP	6,353	1.26	–
Total	502,954	100.00	6
Valid votes	502,954	93.91	
Invalid/blank votes	32,625	6.09	
Total votes	535,579	100.00	
Registered voters/turnout	811,006	66.04	
Source: Ministry of the Interior

Vote in Trentino

Party	Votes	%	Seats
Centre-right	103,594	38.37	2
Centre-left (Note: CB – +E – AVS – PD–IDP – A–IV)	100,602	37.26	1
SVP–PATT (incl. PT)	24,709	9.15	–
Five Star Movement	19,206	7.11	–
ISP	13,595	5.03	–
UP	5,214	1.93	–
Vita	3,092	1.15	–
Total	270,012	100.00	3
Valid votes	270,012	92.96	
Invalid/blank votes	20,435	7.04	
Total votes	290,447	100.00	
Registered voters/turnout	417,154	69.63	
Source: Ministry of the Interior

Vote in South Tyrol

Party	Votes	%	Seats
SVP–PATT	91,294	39.19	2
Centre-right	33,421	14.35	–
Centre-left (Note: PD–IDP – +E – AVS)	21,894	9.40	1
AVS (incl. Greens)	17,574	7.54	–
Vita (incl. Enzian)	14,784	6.35	–
Die Freiheitlichen	14,479	6.22	–
Team K	11,157	4.79	–
PD–IDP	9,612	4.13	–
Five Star Movement	9,149	3.93	–
Action – Italia Viva	6,782	2.91	–
ISP	1,657	0.71	–
UP	1,139	0.49	–
Total	232,942	100.00	3
Valid votes	232,942	95.03	
Invalid/blank votes	12,190	4.97	
Total votes	245,132	100.00	
Registered voters/turnout	393,852	62.24	
Source: Ministry of the Interior

=== Elected members of Parliament ===
Chamber of Deputies
Brothers of Italy

- Alessia Ambrosi
- Andrea de Bertoldi

Südtiroler Volkspartei

- Renate Gebhard
- Manfred Schullian
- Dieter Steger

Democratic Party

- Ferrari Sara

Lega

- Vanessa Cattoi

Source: Ministry of the Interior

Senate of the Republic
Südtiroler Volkspartei

- Meinhard Durnwalder
- Julia Unterberger

Democratic Party

- Pietro Patton
- Luigi Spagnolli

Lega

- Elena Testor

Us Moderates

- Michaela Biancofiore

Source: Ministry of the Interior

== See also ==
- Results of the 2022 Italian general election
- 2022 Italian general election in Aosta Valley
- Proporz
