= 2018 Italian general election in Trentino-Alto Adige/Südtirol =

The Italian general election of 2018 took place on 4 March 2018.

In Trentino the centre-right coalition, dominated by the League, beat the centre-left coalition for the first time since 1996. In South Tyrol the South Tyrolean People's Party (SVP) was confirmed as the largest party. Under the new electoral system, which re-introduced single-seat constituencies also for the Chamber, the centre-right won all such constituencies in Trentino, while the SVP-dominated centre-left prevailed in all the single-seat constituencies of South Tyrol.

== Results ==
Chamber of Deputies

Coalition	Party	Proportional			First-past-the-post			Total seats
Coalition	Party	Votes	%	Seats	Votes	%	Seats	Total seats
Centre-left coalition	SVP–PATT	134,651	24.2	2	241,534	43.4	2	4
Centre-left coalition	Democratic Party	81,671	14.7	-	241,534	43.4	1	1
Centre-left coalition	More Europe	14,162	2.5	-	241,534	43.4	-	-
Centre-left coalition	Popular Civic List (incl. UpT)	7,473	1.3	-	241,534	43.4	-	-
Centre-left coalition	Together	3,577	0.6	-	241,534	43.4	-	-
Centre-left coalition				2			3	5
Centre-right coalition	League (incl. LNT, LNAAST)	106,982	19.2	2	163,285	29.3	3	5
Centre-right coalition	Forza Italia (incl. Fassa)	38,938	7.0	-	163,285	29.3	-	-
Centre-right coalition	Brothers of Italy (incl. AAC)	14,660	2.6	-	163,285	29.3	-	-
Centre-right coalition	Us with Italy	2,705	0.5	-	163,285	29.3	-	-
Centre-right coalition				2			3	5
Five Star Movement		108,686	19.5	1	108,686	19.5	-	1
Free and Equal (incl. Greens)		21,805	3.9	-	21,805	3.9	-	-
Casa Pound Italy		8,060	1.4	-	8,060	1.4	-	-
Power to the People		5,704	1.0	-	5,704	1.0	-	-
The People of the Family		4,897	0.9	-	4,897	0.9	-	-
Human Value Party		3,123	0.6	-	3,123	0.6	-	-
Total		557,094	100.0	5	557,094	100.0	6	11

Source: Ministry of the Interior

Senate of the Republic

Coalition	Party	Proportional			First-past-the-post			Total seats
Coalition	Party	Votes	%	Seats	Votes	%	Seats	Total seats
Centre-left coalition	SVP–PATT	128,282	25.1	1	226,766	44.4	2	3
Centre-left coalition	Democratic Party	75,001	14.7	-	226,766	44.4	1	1
Centre-left coalition	More Europe	12,023	2.4	-	226,766	44.4	-	-
Centre-left coalition	Popular Civic List (incl. UpT)	7,222	1.4	-	226,766	44.4	-	-
Centre-left coalition	Together	4,238	0.8	-	226,766	44.4	-	-
Centre-left coalition				1			3	4
Centre-right coalition	League (incl. LNT, LNAAST)	98,122	19.2	-	151,213	29.6	-	-
Centre-right coalition	Forza Italia (incl. Fassa)	36,662	7.2	-	151,213	29.6	2	2
Centre-right coalition	Brothers of Italy (incl. AAC)	13,612	2.7	-	151,213	29.6	1	1
Centre-right coalition	Us with Italy	2,817	0.6	-	151,213	29.6	-	-
Centre-right coalition				-			3	3
Five Star Movement		98,599	19.3	-	98,599	19.3	-	-
Free and Equal (incl. Greens)		18,666	3.7	-	18,666	3.7	-	-
Casa Pound Italy		5,953	1.2	-	5,953	1.2	-	-
Power to the People		5,266	1.0	-	5,266	1.0	-	-
The People of the Family		4,808	0.9	-	4,808	0.9	-	-
Total		511,271	100.0	1	511,271	100.0	6	7

Source: Ministry of the Interior

PR vote in Trentino

Party	Votes	%
Lega (incl. LNT)	83,510	26.7
Five Star Movement	74,685	23.8
Democratic Party	61,013	19.5
Forza Italia (incl. Fassa)	26,517	8.5
SVP–PATT	15,612	5.0
More Europe	10,789	3.4
Brothers of Italy	10,466	3.3
Free and Equal	9,334	3.0
Popular Civic List (incl. UpT)	6,898	2.2
Power to the People	3,649	1.2
CasaPound Italy	3,142	1.0
The People of the Family	2,719	0.9
Together	2,163	0.7
Us with Italy	1,943	0.6
Human Value Party	799	0.3
Total	313,239	100.00

Source: Ministry of the Interior

PR vote in South Tyrol

Party	Votes	%
SVP–PATT	119,039	48.8
Five Star Movement	34,001	13.9
Lega (incl. LNAAST)	23,472	9.6
Democratic Party	20,658	8.5
Forza Italia	12,421	5.1
Free and Equal (incl. Greens)	12,471	5.1
CasaPound Italy	4,918	2.0
Brothers of Italy (incl. AAC)	4,194	1.7
More Europe	3,373	1.4
Human Value Party	2,324	1.0
The People of the Family	2,178	0.9
Power to the People	2,055	0.8
Together	1,414	0.6
Us with Italy	762	0.3
Popular Civic List	575	0.2
Total	243,855	100.00

Source: Ministry of the Interior

== Elected MPs ==
Chamber of Deputies
Lega

- Maurizio Fugatti
- Diego Binelli
- Giulia Zanotelli
- Vanessa Cattoi
- Stefania Segnana

South Tyrolean People's Party–PATT

- Albrecht Plangger (SVP)
- Renate Gebhard (SVP)
- Manfred Schullian (SVP)
- Emanuela Rossini (PATT)

Democratic Party

- Maria Elena Boschi

Five Star Movement

- Riccardo Fraccaro

Source: La Repubblica

Senate
South Tyrolean People's Party–PATT

- Julia Unterberger (SVP)
- Dieter Steger (SVP)
- Meinhard Durnwalder (SVP)

Forza Italia

- Elena Testor (AF)
- Donatella Conzatti (Indep.)

Democratic Party

- Gianclaudio Bressa

Five Star Movement

- Andrea De Bertoldi

Source: La Repubblica
