= 2013 Italian general election in Trentino-Alto Adige/Südtirol =

The Italian general election of 2013 took place on 24–25 February 2013.

In Trentino the centre-left came first, but Civic Choice, which included Lorenzo Dellai's Union for Trentino, had a strong showing. In South Tyrol the South Tyrolean People's Party was confirmed as the largest party, but Die Freiheitlichen had their best result ever in a general election.

== Results ==
=== Chamber of Deputies ===
==== Trentino ====
Coalition leader	votes	votes (%)	Party	votes	votes (%)
Pier Luigi Bersani	94,960	30.9	Democratic Party	72,852	23.7
Pier Luigi Bersani	94,960	30.9	South Tyrolean People's Party (including PATT)	14,650	4.8
Pier Luigi Bersani	94,960	30.9	Left Ecology Freedom	7,458	2.4
Silvio Berlusconi	71,983	23.4	The People of Freedom	46.187	15.0
Silvio Berlusconi	71,983	23.4	Lega Nord	22.523	7.3
Silvio Berlusconi	71,983	23.4	Others	3.273	1.0
Beppe Grillo	63,758	20.8	Five Star Movement	63,758	20.8
Mario Monti	63,603	20.7	Civic Choice (including UpT)	60,030	19.6
Mario Monti	63,603	20.7	Union of the Centre	3,573	1.2
Antonio Ingroia	5,976	1.9	Civil Revolution	5,976	1.9
Oscar Giannino	5,021	1.6	Act to Stop the Decline	5,021	1.6
Others	1,747	0.6	Others	1,747	0.6
Total coalitions	307,048	100.0	Total parties	307,048	100.0

Source: Ministry of the Interior

==== South Tyrol ====
Coalition leader	votes	votes (%)	Party	votes	votes (%)
Pier Luigi Bersani	176,128	58.9	South Tyrolean People's Party	132,154	44.2
Pier Luigi Bersani	176,128	58.9	Democratic Party	28,372	9.5
Pier Luigi Bersani	176,128	58.9	Left Ecology Freedom (including Greens)	15,602	5.2
Ulli Mair	47,634	15.9	Die Freiheitlichen	47,634	15.9
Beppe Grillo	24,864	8.3	Five Star Movement	24,864	8.3
Silvio Berlusconi	24,263	8.1	The People of Freedom	19,941	6.7
Silvio Berlusconi	24,263	8.1	Others	4,322	1.4
Mario Monti	20,639	6.9	Civic Choice	19,409	6.5
Mario Monti	20,639	6.9	Others	1,230	0.4
Others	5,657	1.9	Others	5,657	1.9
Total coalitions	299,185	100.0	Total parties	299,185	100.0

Source: Ministry of the Interior

=== Senate of the Republic ===
Party (or a unified coalition list)	Total votes	%	Seats
SVP – PATT – PD – UPT (only Trentino)	127,656	23.43	3
South Tyrolean People's Party (SVP) (only Brixen and Merano constituencies)	97,141	17.82	2
The People of Freedom – Northern League (PdL–LN)	85,298	15.65	1
Five Star Movement (M5S)	82,499	15.14	0
PD – SVP (only Bolzano constituency)	47,623	8.74	1
Die Freiheitlichen (DF) (only South Tyrol)	42,094	7.72	0
Greens (VGV) (only Brixen and Merano constituencies)	12,808	2.34	0
Civil Revolution (RC)	11,262	2.06	0
Democratic Party (PD) (only Brixen and Merano constituencies)	8,797	1.61	0
Act to Stop the Decline (FFD) (only Bolzano constituency and Trentino)	8,796	1.61	0
With Monti for Italy (only Brixen and Merano constituencies)	6,646	1.39	0
Alto Adige in the Heart (AAC)	4,672	0.85	0
Moderates in Revolution (MIR) (only Trentino)	3,414	0.62	0
Brothers of Italy (FdI) (only Bolzano constituency)	3,414	0.62	0
The Right (LD) (only South Tyrol)	1,181	0.21	0
CasaPound (CPI) (only Bolzano constituency)	1,160	0.21	0
Party for All (only Bolzano constituency)	426	0.07	0
Total valid votes	544,838	–	–
Blank/void/unassigned votes	30,437	–	–
Total votes	575,275	100.00	7
Registered voters/turnout	707,666	81.29	–
Source: Ministry of the Interior

Vote in Trentino

Party	Votes	%	Seats
Centre-left (Note: SVP – PATT – PD – UpT)	127,655	46.44	3
Centre-right (Note: PdL – LN)	66,130	24.06	–
Five Star Movement	61,109	22.23	–
Civil Revolution	8,709	3.17	–
Act to Stop the Decline	7,875	2.86	–
Moderates in Revolution	3,414	1.24	–
Total	274,892	100.00	3
Valid votes	274,892	93.83	
Invalid/blank votes	18,074	6.17	
Total votes	292,966	100.00	
Registered voters/turnout	366,036	80.04	
Source: Ministry of the Interior

Vote in South Tyrol

Party	Votes	%	Seats
South Tyrolean People's Party	97,141	35.99	2
PD – SVP	47,623	17.64	1
Die Freiheitlichen	42,084	15.59	–
Five Star Movement	21,390	7.92	–
PdL – LN	19,167	7.10	–
Greens	12,808	4.74	–
Democratic Party	8,797	3.26	–
Civic Choice	7,646	2.83	–
Alto Adige in the Heart	4,672	1.73	–
Civil Revolution	2,553	0.95	–
Brothers of Italy	2,365	0.88	–
The Right	1,181	0.44	–
CasaPound	1,159	0.43	–
Act to Stop the Decline	920	0.34	–
Party for All	426	0.16	–
Total	269,932	100.00	3
Valid votes	269,932	95.62	
Invalid/blank votes	12,377	4.38	
Total votes	282,309	100.00	
Registered voters/turnout	341,630	82.64	
Source: Ministry of the Interior

== MPs elected in Trentino-Alto Adige/Südtirol ==
=== Chamber of Deputies ===
South Tyrolean People's Party

- Albrecht Plangger
- Renate Gebhard
- Daniel Alfreider
- Mauro Ottobre (PATT)
- Manfred Schullian

Democratic Party

- Gianclaudio Bressa
- Michele Nicoletti
- Maria Luisa Gnecchi

The People of Freedom

- Michaela Biancofiore

Five Star Movement

- Riccardo Fraccaro

Civic Choice

- Lorenzo Dellai (UpT)

Left Ecology Freedom

- Florian Kronbichler (Greens)

=== Senate ===
South Tyrolean People's Party

- Hans Berger
- Karl Zeller

South Tyrolean People's Party – Democratic Party

- Francesco Palermo (PD)

Democratic Party – Union of Trentino – Trentino Tyrolean Autonomist Party

- Franco Panizza (UpT)
- Vittorio Fravezzi (PATT)
- Giorgio Tonini (PD)

The People of Freedom – Lega Nord

- Sergio Divina (LNT)
