= 2008 Italian general election in Trentino-Alto Adige/Südtirol =

The Italian general election of 2008 took place on 13–14 April 2008.

In Trentino the centre-right came first thanks to the strong showing of Lega Nord, while in South Tyrol the South Tyrolean People's Party was confirmed as the largest party, but lost many votes to its right-wing competitors, Die Freiheitlichen and Union for South Tyrol.

== Results ==
=== Chamber of Deputies ===
==== Trentino ====
Coalition leader	votes	votes (%)	Party	votes	votes (%)
Silvio Berlusconi	139,088	43.9	The People of Freedom	86,977	27.4
Silvio Berlusconi	139,088	43.9	Lega Nord	52,111	16.4
Walter Veltroni	117,508	37.1	Democratic Party	102,359	32.3
Walter Veltroni	117,508	37.1	Italy of Values	15,149	4.8
Pier Ferdinando Casini	20,307	6.4	Union of the Centre	20,307	6.4
Siegfried Brugger	15,054	4.8	South Tyrolean People's Party	15,054	4.8
Fausto Bertinotti	9,374	3.0	The Left – The Rainbow	9,374	3.0
Daniela Santanchè	7,370	2.3	The Right	7,370	2.3
Others	8,220	2.6	others	8,220	2.6
Total coalitions	316,921	100.0	Total parties	316,921	100.0

Source: Ministry of the Interior

==== South Tyrol ====
Coalition leader	votes	votes (%)	Party	votes	votes (%)
Siegfried Brugger	132,612	44.3	South Tyrolean People's Party	132,612	44.3
Walter Veltroni	53,924	18.0	Democratic Party	48,613	16.4
Walter Veltroni	53,924	18.0	Italy of Values	5,311	1.7
Silvio Berlusconi	47,966	16.0	The People of Freedom	42,015	14.0
Silvio Berlusconi	47,966	16.0	Lega Nord	5,951	2.0
Pius Leitner	28,224	9.4	Die Freiheitlichen	28,224	9.4
Andreas Pöder	12,443	4.2	Union for South Tyrol	12,443	4.2
Fausto Bertinotti	9,933	3.3	The Left – The Rainbow	9,933	3.3
Pier Ferdinando Casini	5,380	1.8	Union of the Centre	5,380	1.8
Daniela Santanchè	5,067	1.7	The Right	5,067	1.7
Others	3,751	1.3	others	3,751	1.3
Total coalitions	299,300	100.0	Total parties	299,300	100.0

Source: Ministry of the Interior

=== Senate of the Republic ===
Vote in Trentino

Party	Votes	%	Seats
The People of Freedom	114,741	40.21	2
SVP – Centre-left	110,486	38.72	1
Union of the Centre	25,267	8.85	–
The Left – The Rainbow	24,955	8.75	–
The Right	9,900	3.47	–
Total	285,349	100.00	3
Valid votes	285,349	94.48	
Invalid/blank votes	16,687	5.52	
Total votes	302,036	100.00	
Registered voters/turnout	359,916	83.92	
Source: Ministry of the Interior

Vote in South Tyrol

Party	Votes	%	Seats
South Tyrolean People's Party	98,948	36.84	2
SVP – Centre-left	43,235	16.10	1
The People of Freedom	41,385	15.41	–
Die Freiheitlichen	24,772	9.22	–
Democratic Party	19,253	7.17	–
The Left – The Rainbow	15,002	5.59	–
Union for South Tyrol	11,820	4.40	–
Union of the Centre	7,244	2.70	–
The Right	6,562	2.44	–
Socialist Party	369	0.14	–
Total	268,590	100.00	3
Valid votes	268,590	94.61	
Invalid/blank votes	15,315	5.39	
Total votes	283,905	100.00	
Registered voters/turnout	334,049	84.99	
Source: Ministry of the Interior

== MPs elected in Trentino-Alto Adige/Südtirol ==
=== Chamber of Deputies ===
Democratic Party

- Gianclaudio Bressa
- Laura Froner
- Maria Luisa Gnecchi

The People of Freedom

- Manuela Di Centa
- Giorgio Holzmann
- Maurizio Di Tenno

South Tyrolean People's Party

- Siegfried Brugger
- Karl Zeller

Lega Nord

- Maurizio Fugatti

=== Senate ===
South Tyrolean People's Party

- Helga Thaler Ausserhofer
- Manfred Pinzger
- Oskar Peterlini

The People of Freedom

- Cristiano De Eccher
- Giacomo Santini

Democratic Party

- Claudio Molinari

Lega Nord

- Sergio Divina
