= Trentino-Alto Adige/Südtirol (Chamber of Deputies constituency) =

- Chamber of Deputies; Electoral constituency
- Region: Trentino-Alto Adige/Südtirol
- Electorate: 796,817 (2018)
- Major settlements: Bolzano, Trento

Current constituency
- Created: 1993
- Seats: 11

Trentino-Alto Adige/Südtirol is one of the 29 constituencies (Italian: circoscrizioni) represented in the Chamber of Deputies, the lower house of the Italian parliament. The constituency currently elects 11 deputies. Its boundaries correspond to those of the Italian region of Trentino-Alto Adige/Südtirol. The electoral system uses a parallel voting system, which act as a mixed system, with 37% of seats allocated using a first-past-the-post electoral system and 61% using a proportional method, with one round of voting.

The constituency was first established by the Mattarella law on 4 August 1993 and later confirmed by the Calderoli law on 21 December 2005 and by the Rosato law on 3 November 2017.

== Electoral results ==
=== 2018 ===
==== General results (Proportional+FPTP) ====
Coalition	Party	Votes	%	Seats	
Coalition	Party	Votes	%	Prop.	FPTP
Centre-left	SVP - PATT	134 613	24.16	2	
Centre-left	Democratic Party	81 695	14.66	-	
Centre-left	+Europe	14 205	2.55	-	
Centre-left	Popular Civic List	7 509	1.35	-	
Centre-left	Together	3 581	0.64	-	
Centre-left	Total (coalition)	241 603	43.36	2	3
Centre-right	League	107 589	19.31	2	
Centre-right	Forza Italia	39 021	7.00	-	
Centre-right	Brothers of Italy	14 574	2.62	-	
Centre-right	Us with Italy-UDC	2 154	0.39	-	
Centre-right	Total (coalition)	136 338	29.31	2	3
Five Star Movement		108 670	19.50	1	-
Free and Equal		21 809	3.91	-	-
CasaPound		8 057	1.45	-	-
Power to the People!		5 705	1.02	-	-
Others		8 016	1.44	-	-
Total		557 198	100.00	5	6

==== First-past-the-post results ====
Elected in the Centre-left coalition+SVP - PATT

Elected in the SVP - PATT list

Elected in the Centre-right coalition

Uninominal district	Elected	Party
1. Bolzano	Maria Elena Boschi	PD
2. Merano	Albrecht Plangger	SVP
3. Brixen	Renate Gebhard	SVP
4. Trento	Giulia Zantonelli	Lega
5. Rovereto	Vanessa Cattoi	Lega
6. Pergine Valsugana	Maurizio Fugatti	Lega

==== Proportional results ====
Plurinominal district	SVP - PATT	League	Five Star Movement
Trentino-Alto Adige - 01	Manfred Schullian; Emanuela Rossini	Diego Binelli; Stefania Segnana	Riccardo Fraccaro
