= Luis Durnwalder =

Italian politician

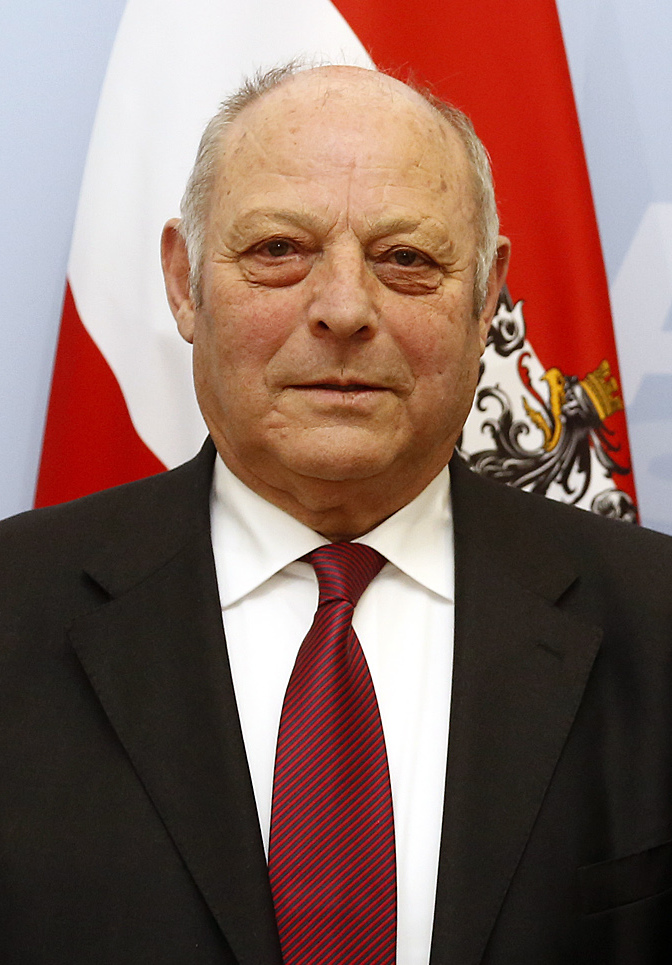
- Durnwalder in 2012

President of Trentino-Alto Adige/Südtirol
- In office 17 February 2008 – 15 June 2011
- Preceded by: Lorenzo Dellai
- Succeeded by: Lorenzo Dellai
- In office 18 February 2004 – 23 May 2006
- Preceded by: Carlo Andreotti
- Succeeded by: Lorenzo Dellai

Governor of South Tyrol
- In office 17 March 1989 – 9 January 2014
- Preceded by: Silvius Magnago
- Succeeded by: Arno Kompatscher

Personal details
- Born: 23 September 1941 (age 85) Pfalzen, Italy
- Party: SVP
- Relatives: Meinhard Durnwalder (nephew)

Luis Durnwalder (born 23 September 1941) is an Italian politician, former governor of the autonomous province of South Tyrol from 1989 until 2014, and former president and vice-president of Trentino-Alto Adige/Südtirol, in Northern Italy.

== Biography ==
Durnwalder was born in Pfalzen. After attending school in Pfalzen and Brixen, he originally planned to enter an Augustinian choir at the Neustift monastery in Brixen; however, Durnwalder decided instead to study agriculture at the University of Natural Resources and Life Sciences in Vienna, additionally he attended lectures in law. During this time he began his political activity and became chairman of the student group Südtiroler Hochschülerschaft (until 1965).

In 1969, he became mayor of his home municipality and in 1973 delegate to the provincial assembly; he was Regional Counsellor for the Land Register from 1973 to 1978. At that time he also worked as director of the farmers' association, Südtiroler Bauernbund, and moved to Bolzano, where he lives today. After the 1978 elections, he was elected member of the regional government. From 1989 until 2014 he presided over the provincial government as governor (Landeshauptmann).

Durnwalder is a member of the South Tyrolean People's Party.

He is Knight of Honor of the Order of St. George and has been awarded the Decoration for Services to the Austrian Black Cross.
