= Rosmarie Pamer =

Italian politician (born 1971)

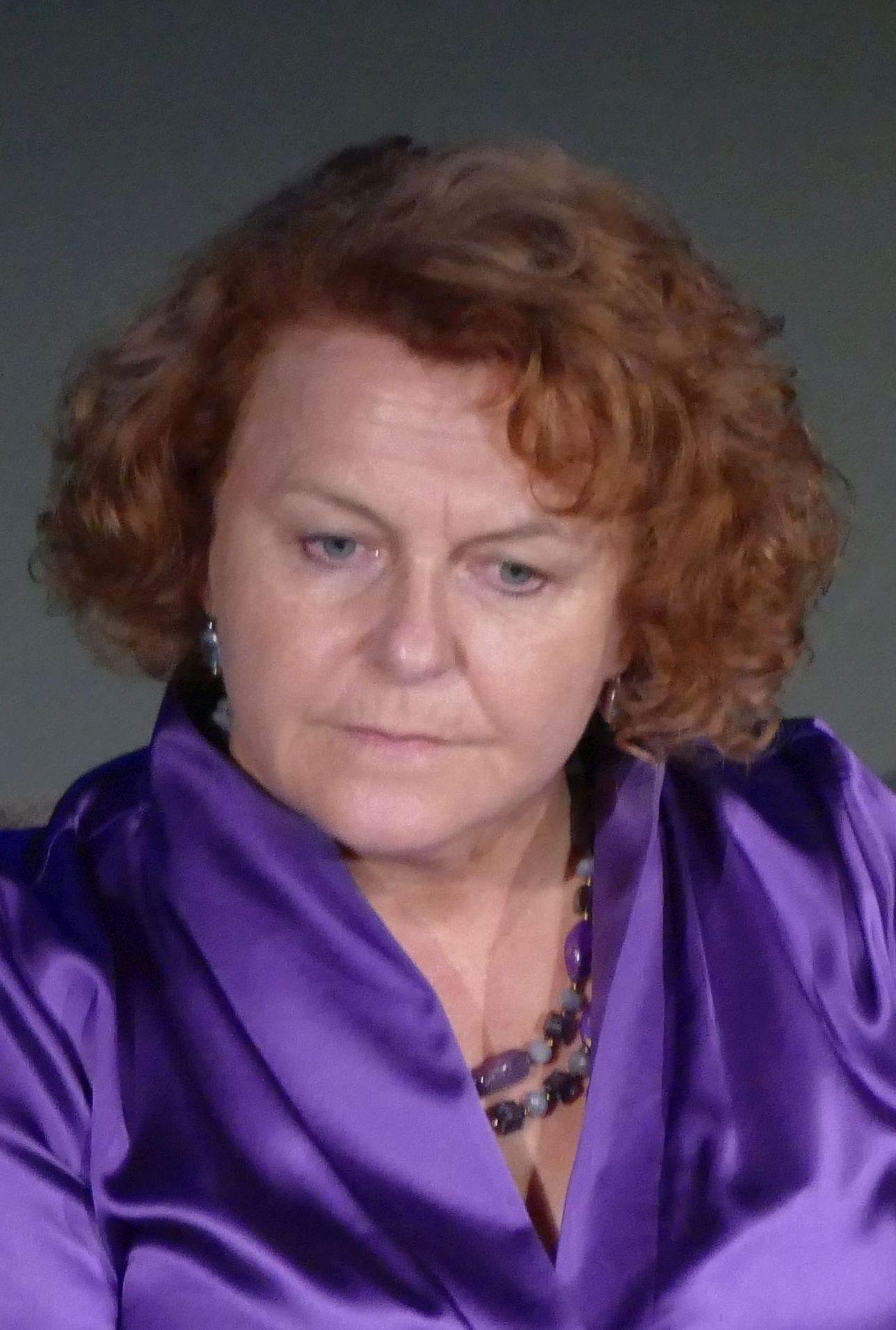
- Pamer in October 2023

Member of the Landtag of South Tyrol
- Incumbent
- Assumed office 13 November 2023

Personal details
- Born: 19 March 1971 (age 55) St. Martin in Passeier, Italy
- Party: SVP
- Education: University of Innsbruck

Rosmarie Pamer (born 19 March 1971) is an Italian politician and middle school teacher from South Tyrol. A member of the South Tyrolean People's Party, she was elected to the Landtag of South Tyrol in the 2023 provincial elections.

== Early life and education ==
Pamer grew up on a mountain farm above St. Martin in Passeier. After elementary and middle school in St. Martin, she attended the secondary school in Merano. She then completed a biology degree at the University of Innsbruck, which she completed with a diploma thesis in 1995.

== Political career ==
Pamer has been politically active since 1995. She was deputy mayor and community representative of St. Martin from 1995 to 2010. In 2010, she was elected mayor with 56.3% of the vote, and was confirmed in the 2015 and 2020 local elections. Since 2022 she has been SVP district chairwoman for the Burggrafenamt. She ran for the SVP in the provincial elections in 2023 and was able to collect 12,290 preferential votes, which meant that she entered the Landtag of South Tyrol and at the same time the Trentino-South Tyrol regional council. On 1 February 2024, she was elected to the new state government; In the Kompatscher III cabinet, she acts as first deputy state governor and, as state councilor, oversees the issues of social cohesion, family and voluntary work.

== Personal life ==
Pamer lives in St. Martin with her partner and son.
