= Die Freiheitlichen =

Political party in South Tyrol

- President: Roland Stauder
- Secretary: Dietmar Zwerger
- Honorary President: Pius Leitner
- Founded: 7 December 1992; 33 years ago
- Split from: Union for South Tyrol; South Tyrolean People's Party
- Headquarters: Via della Chiesa 62; Terlan
- Ideology: Regionalism; Separatism; Right-wing populism; German-speaking minority interests
- Political position: Right-wing
- Chamber of Deputies: 0 / 400
- Senate: 0 / 200
- European Parliament: 0 / 76
- Provincial Council: 1 / 35

Website
- die-freiheitlichen.com

Die Freiheitlichen (German: [diː ˈfʁaɪhaɪtlɪçn̩]), abbreviated dF) is a regionalist, separatist, and right-wing populist political party in South Tyrol, in northern Italy. The party, which is part of the South Tyrolean independence movement, seeks to represent the German-speaking majority and Ladin-speaking minority in the province and to separate it from Italy.

Broadly speaking, the party's ideology is similar to that of the Freedom Party of Austria (FPÖ), and the two parties maintain close contacts. The party was long led by Pius Leitner, who led it to become the second-largest party after the dominant South Tyrolean People's Party (SVP) in the 2013 provincial elections, the party's best result so far. The party's name is variously translated into English as "The Freedomites", a term frequently used for FPÖ's members by English media, and by the FPÖ itself, "The Libertarians", and "The Liberals".

== History ==
=== Foundation and early years ===
In 1992, a group of young right-wingers left the South Tyrolean People's Party (SVP). They were led by the "Gang of Four": Christian Waldner (former leader of the Junge Generation, SVP's youth section), Peter Paul Reiner, Pius Leitner and Stephan Gutweniger.

The new party was launched on 7 December 1992. It was soon joined by disgruntled former members of the Freedom Party of South Tyrol (FPS) who had been marginalized after FPS merged into the Union for South Tyrol (UfS). The move was strongly encouraged by Jörg Haider, at the time leader of the Freedom Party of Austria, colloquially known as die Freiheitlichen too. Gerold Meraner, former member of the Party of Independents and former leader of the FPS and founding member of the UfS, considered the new party as the legitimate heir of his FPS.

Under Waldner's leadership, the party won 6.1% of the vote in the 1993 provincial election and got two provincial councillors elected, Waldner and Leitner. Soon after the election, a divide emerged between Waldner, who espoused more nationalist attitudes, and Leitner, who was the leader of the party's liberal faction. In 1994, Waldner left and started a short-lived party, "The Liberals" (renamed "Alliance 98" in 1996).

=== Decline and resurgence ===
In February 1997, Waldner was shot dead by his former political ally Reiner. This dramatic event was a shock for the party and led to its decline which seemed irreversible. In the 1998 provincial election, the party's share of vote was only 2.5% and Leitner alone was elected in the Provincial Council.

However, the party held on and experienced a quick resurgence in the 2003 provincial election, in which it jumped to 5.0% of the vote, resulting in two provincial councillors again: Leitner and Ulli Mair, a young woman who had been party secretary since 2001 and would become a significant figure within the party.

In the 2006 general election, dF obtained 5.4% of the vote. In the 2008 general election, they almost doubled their share of vote to 9.4%.

In the 2008 provincial election, dF became the second-largest party in the Province with 14.3% of the vote (a net gain of 9.3%) and had five provincial councillors elected (up from the previous two). For the first time in history, the two largest political forces of South Tyrol were German-speaking parties.

=== More electoral successes ===
In February 2012, after 18 years at the head of the party, Leitner chose to step down and promote Mair as his successor.

In March 2012, in the midst of the European debt crisis and consequent recession in Italy, the party officially turned to separatism, proposing the creation of a South Tyrolean independent and sovereign Freistaat (free state) through a referendum, which would need the approval also of the Italian-speaking minority.

In the 2013 general election, the party won 15.9% of the vote, its best result ever in a general election.

In the 2013 provincial election, dF won 17.9% of the vote (another record high and +3.6pp since 2008), resulting in six provincial councillors.

In the 2014 European Parliament election, the party ran in alliance with Lega Nord (LN), with Leitner obtaining virtually 7,000 preference votes.

=== Scandal and new leadership ===
In June 2014, following a scandal on advance retirement payments which invested all the regional councillors, the party entirely renewed its leadership by electing Walter Blaas president and appointing Simon Auer secretary. The alliance with the LN was cemented by the endorsement of South Tyrolean self-determination by LN leader Matteo Salvini, and the candidacy of Rosa Lamprecht, Blaas' wife, in the slate of Lega Alto Adige Südtirol (LAAST) in the 2016 Bolzano municipal election.

In March 2017, Leitner resigned from the Provincial Council after being convicted in a minor expenses scandal.

In May 2017, Andreas Leiter Reber, a hardliner, was elected party president, by beating the more moderate Arno Mall, and re-launched the concept of Freistaat.

The dF did not participate in the 2018 general election, while losing two thirds of its support in the 2018 provincial election, when it stopped at 6.2%.

In January 2023, Leiter Reber stepped down in favour of Sabine Zoderer, who was elected president during a congress in February.

=== Provincial government ===
In the 2023 provincial election, the party was reduced to 4.9%, but confirmed its two provincial councillors, Mair and Leiter Reber. Immediately after the election, Zoderer, who had obtained fewer preference votes than expected for a leader, stepped down from president and left the party altogether. However, due to the high fragmentation in the Provincial Council, the party had the chance to join for the first time the provincial government, led for the third consecutive time by Arno Kompatscher, along with the SVP, the Brothers of Italy (FdI), the LAAST and The Civic List (LC), and Mair was appointed minister in charge of housing, security and violence prevention. Leiter Reber chose not to give the vote of confidence to the government; in February 2024, Leiter Reber left the party and formed the Free Group in the Provincial Council, while still giving occasional support to the government.

In June 2024 Roland Stauder was elected president during a party congress.

== Popular support ==
The electoral results of the party in the Province of Bolzano since 1993 are shown in the tables below.

1993 provinc.	1994 general	1994 European	1996 general	1998 provinc.	1999 European	2001 general	2003 provinc.	2004 European	2006 general
6.1	-	4.6 (Note: In list with the Valdostan Union.)	-	2.5	-	-	5.0	-	5.4

2008 general	2008 provinc.	2009 European	2013 general	2013 provinc.	2014 European	2018 general	2018 provinc.	2019 European	2022 general	2023 provincial
9.4	14.3	-	15.9	17.9	6.0 (Note: In list with the Lega Nord.)	-	6.2	-	-	4.9

== Election results ==
=== Landtag of South Tyrol ===
Landtag of South Tyrol
Election	Votes	%	Seats	+/−
1993	18,669	6.1	2 / 35	–
1998	7,543	2.5	1 / 35	▼1
2003	15,121	5.0	2 / 35	▲1
2008	43,614	14.3	5 / 35	▲3
2013	51,504	17.9	6 / 35	▲1
2018	17,620	6.2	2 / 35	▼4
2023	13,836	4.9	2 / 35	–

== Leadership ==
- President: Christian Waldner (1992–1994), Pius Leitner (1994–2012), Ulli Mair (2012–2014), Walter Blaas (2014–2017), Andreas Leiter Reber (2017–2023), Sabine Zoderer (2023), Roland Stauder and Otto Mahlknecht (acting, 2023–2024), Roland Stauder (2024–present)
  - Honorary President: Pius Leitner (2013–present)
- Secretary: Pius Leitner (1992–1994), Sigmar Stocker (1995–2001), Ulli Mair (2001–2012), Michael Demanega (2012–2014), Simon Auer (2014–2017), Florian von Ach (2017–2019), Otto Mahlknecht (2019–2023), Dietmar Zwerger (2023–present)

== See also ==
- List of political parties in South Tyrol

== Bibliography ==
- Medda-Windischer, Roberta; Carlà, Andrea, eds. (2015). Migration and Autonomous Territories: The Case of South Tyrol and Catalonia. Brill Publishers. ISBN 978-90-04-28278-0.
- Babayev, Azer; Schoch, Bruno; Spanger, Hans-Joachim, eds. (2020). The Nagorno-Karabakh Deadlock: Insights From Successful Conflict Settlements. Springer Nature. ISBN 978-36-58-25198-7.
