= Philipp Achammer =

Italian politician

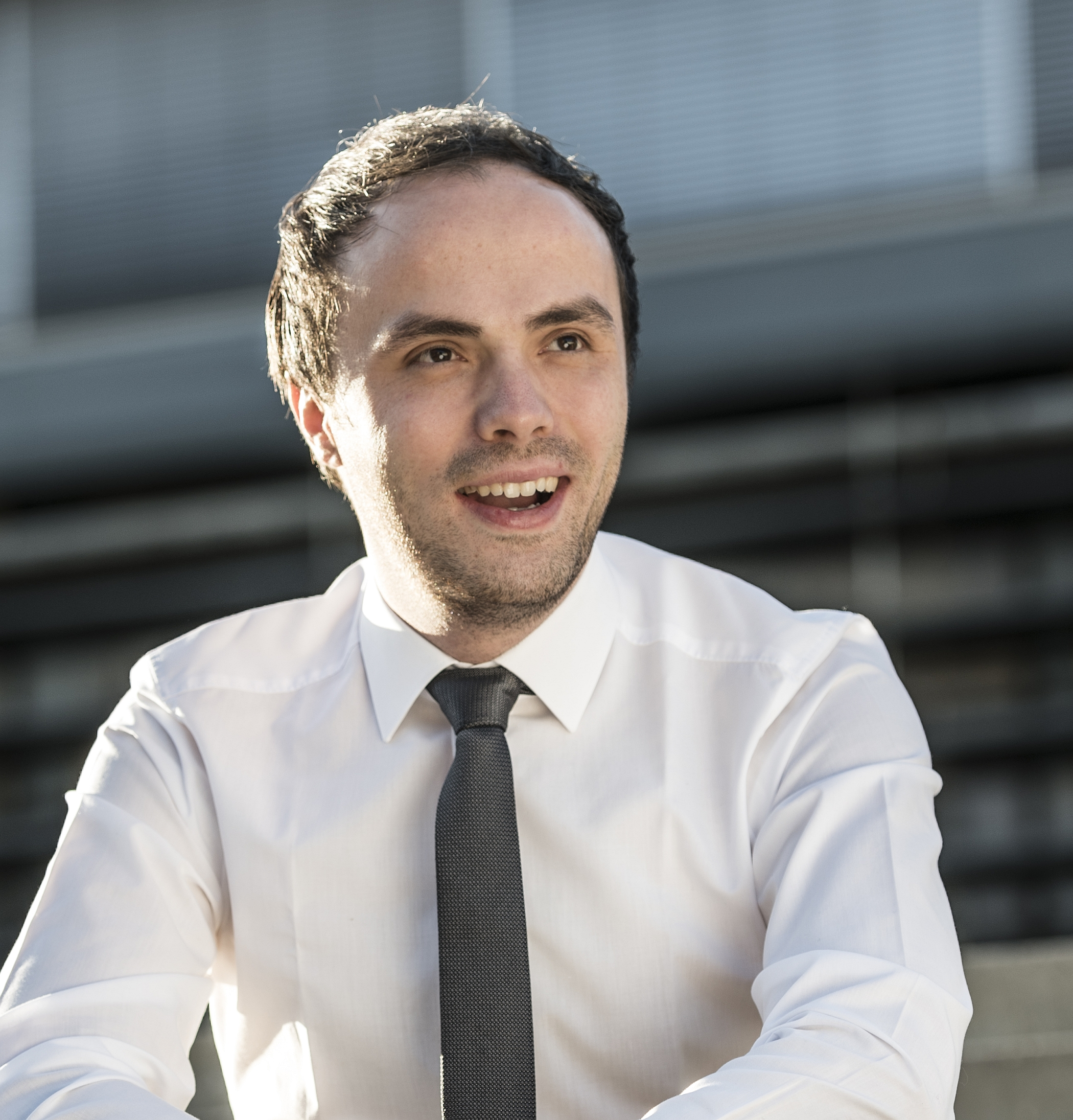

Chairman of the South Tyrolean People's Party
- Incumbent
- Assumed office 3 May 2014
- Preceded by: Richard Theiner

Personal details
- Born: 4 July 1985 (age 40) Brixen, Italy
- Party: SVP

Philipp Achammer (born 4 July 1985) is an Italian politician active in South Tyrol, who is serving as leader of the South Tyrolean People's Party since 2014.

== Biography ==
Philipp Achammer was born in Brixen, South Tyrol, in 1985. In 2003 he became the referent of the youth section of the South Tyrolean People's Party (SVP), the so-called Junge Generation, for Vintl, reaching, after a few years, the same role for the whole area of Brixen.

From 2005 to 2010 he sits on the Vintl's city council. From 2008 to 2009, Achammer led the Junge Generation, and then assumed the position, which he held until 2013, of provincial secretary of the party. Following the October 2013 elections, he became a member of the provincial council. He then became part of the provincial council led by Arno Kompatscher, with responsibility for education in German, right to study, professional training, culture and integration. On 3 May 2014, at the 60th Provincial Congress of the SVP, Achammer was appointed chairman the party with 94.4% of the votes in the assembly of delegates.
