= Silvius Magnago =

Italian politician (1914–2010)

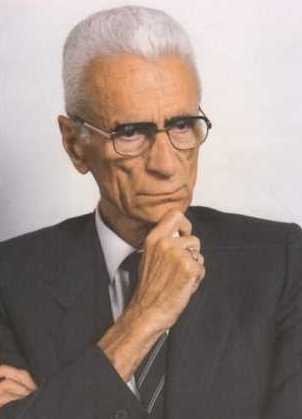
Silvius Magnago

Silvius Magnago (5 February 1914 – 25 May 2010) was a South Tyrolean politician who served as Chairman of the South Tyrolean People's Party from 1957 to 1991 and as Governor of South Tyrol from 1960 to 1989.

== Biography ==
Magnago was born in Meran, which was then part of the Austro-Hungarian Empire, on 5 February 1914. In 1936 he graduated from the grammar school of the Franciscans in Bozen. He studied law at the University of Bologna and graduated with a JD in June 1940. Because of his rejection of Italian Fascism he chose to move to Germany in 1939, but remained first in South Tyrol, where he worked in Bolzano for a commission to estimate the assets of the Tyroleans following the South Tyrol Option Agreement. He was eventually conscripted into the German Army as a lieutenant, and sent to the Eastern Front, where a severe injury lead to the amputation of his left leg.

In the postwar period Magnago started his political activities in the municipal council of Bolzano as a member of the newly founded South Tyrolean People's Party (SVP). From 1948 to 1952 he acted as the city's vice-mayor. In 1948, he was also elected for the first time to the Landtag of South Tyrol and Regional Council of Trentino-Alto Adige, where he remained until 1988. Magnago became chairman (Obmann) of his party in 1957, and held that function until 1991. In 1957, Magnago was the central figure of a strategic turn of his party: up to that year the South Tyrolean People's Party had unsuccessfully tried to gain some margins of self-governance via a soft policy of alliances with the governing Democrazia Cristiana. Under the new leader and new motto Los von Trient (i.e. away from Trento, with regard to the regional capital) the SVP started to take a harder line, in order to obtain a devolution of powers to the provincial level of administration. From 1960 to 1989 Magnago was the governor (Landeshauptmann) of the autonomous province of South Tyrol. His major political success was the commencement of the second Statute of Autonomy in 1972, which distinctly extended South Tyrol's legislative and executive competencies.

After suffering from Parkinson's disease for several years, Magnago died in Bolzano on 25 May 2010.

== Legacy ==
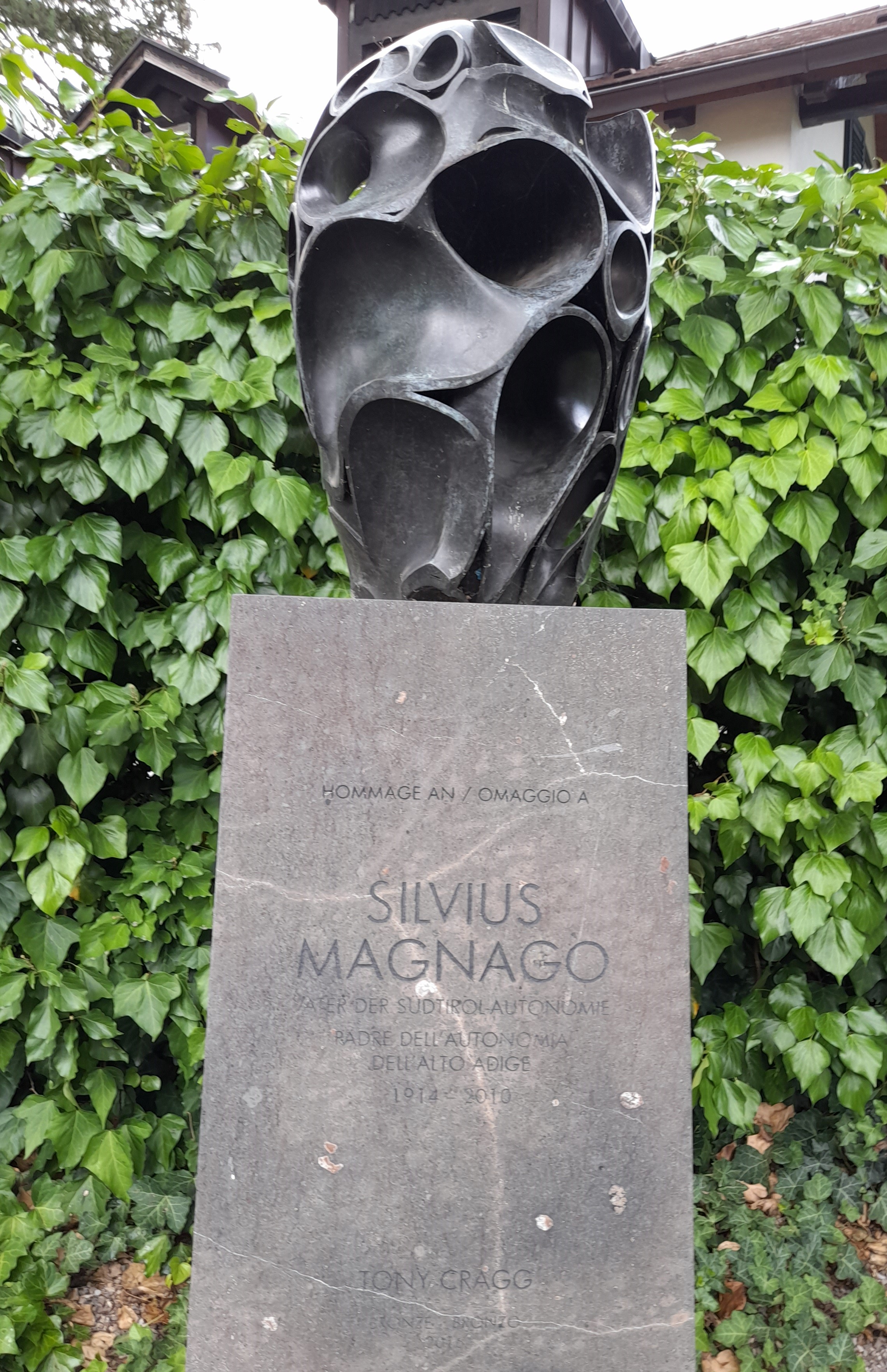
Bronze sculpture hommage a Silvio Magnago, Tony Cragg, 2016 in Meran

Due to his long-time commitment to self-governance of his native province, he is widely regarded as the father of South Tyrolean autonomy.

== Bibliography ==
- Hans Benedikter: Silvius Magnago: ein Leben für Südtirol. Athesia, Bozen 1983, ISBN 88-7014-296-5.
- Claudio Calabrese: Silvius Magnago: il patriarca (1914–2010). Praxis 3, Bozen 2010, ISBN 978-88-96134-08-5.
- Hans Karl Peterlini: Silvius Magnago. Das Vermächtnis: Bekenntnisse einer politischen Legende. Edition Raetia, Bozen 2007, ISBN 978-88-7283-300-1.
- Gottfried Solderer (ed.): Silvius Magnago: eine Biographie Südtirols. Edition Raetia, Bozen 1996, ISBN 978-88-7283-053-6.
