= Oskar Peterlini =

Italian political scientist and politician

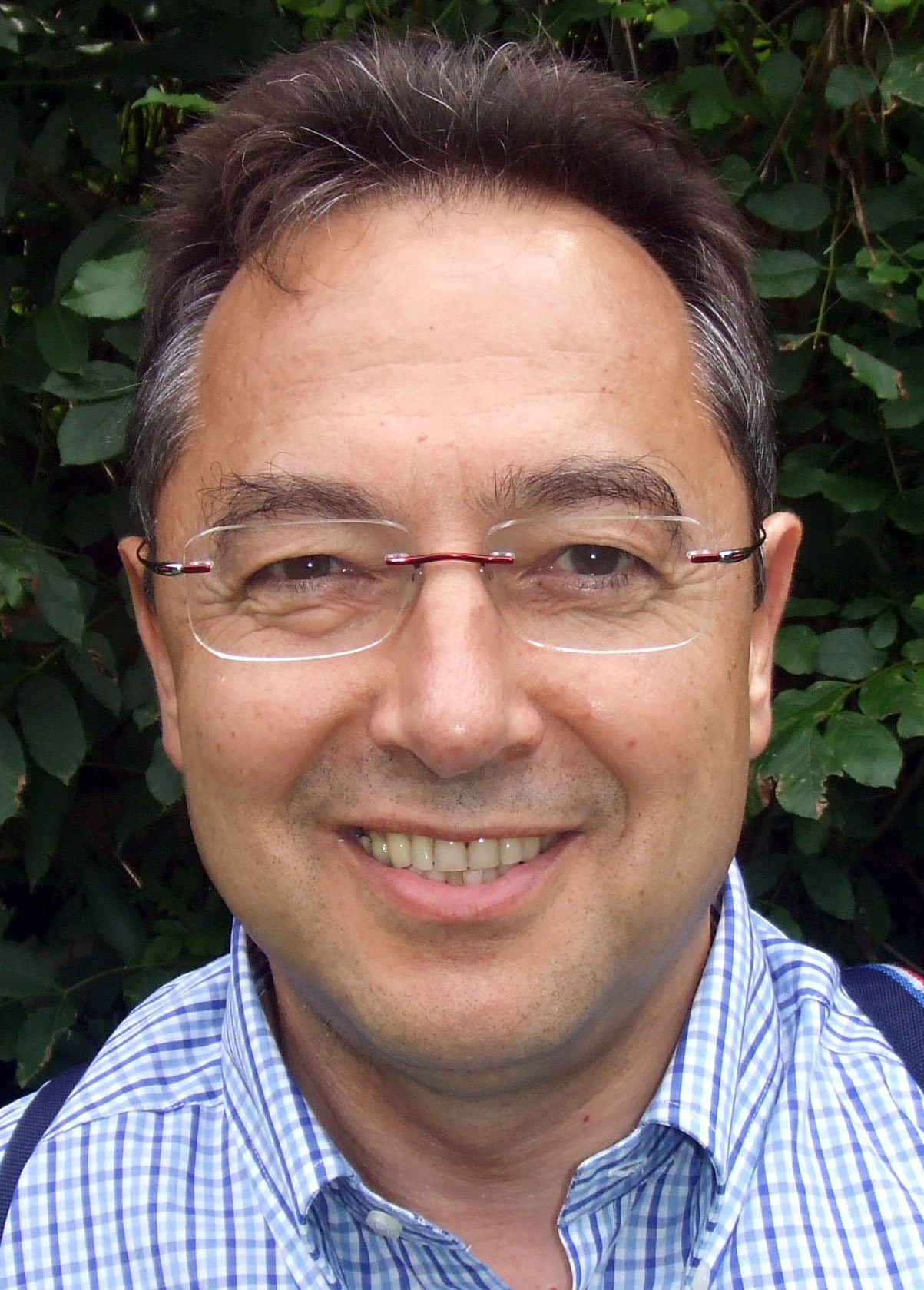
2008

Oskar Peterlini (born 19 September 1950) is an Italian political writer and Lecturer at the Free University of Bozen Bolzano.

He is a Representative of the German-speaking South Tyrolean Minority in South Tyrol, Italy. He was a member of the Italian Senate in the Italian Parliament from 2001 to 2013, Member of the Regional Parliament of Trentino South Tyrol from 1978 to 1998 and its president from 1988–1998. He was also President of the district of the South Tyrolean Unterland of the South Tyrolean People's Party (SVP) from 2001 to 2010.

== Life ==
Peterlini was born on 19 September 1950 in Bozen-Bolzano, South Tyrol, and lives today in the village of Branzoll-Bronzolo. He studied Law and Economics at the Universities of Modena and Innsbruck, and graduated in Business Management at the University of Venice "Ca' Foscari", and specialized in Portfolio Management at the New York City New York Institute of Finance. In 2010 he was awarded the Doctor in Social and economic science at the Faculty of Political science and Social sciences of the University of Innsbruck. He achieved his PhD with a Thesis about the Italian Constitutional reform and its impact on the special autonomies and with a research project about the electoral systems and their effect on linguistic minorities.In 2023, he achieved the Habilitation in Political Science with a thesis submitted to the University of Rostock on the topic of "Autonomy as a peace solution". The brother of Oskar Peterlini is the journalist and Professor of Educational Sciences at the University of Klagenfurt Hans Karl Peterlini. Oskar has four children.

== Career ==
Peterlini was from 1972 to 1979, first secretary then leader of the youth movement Junge Generation of the Südtiroler Volkspartei. He was elected 1978 as youngest member to the Regional Parliament of Trentino-Alto Adige/Südtirol and the Provincial Parliament, Landtag (Südtirol). of South Tyrol. Peterlini was a member of the regional Parliament from 1978 till 1998 and served as its president from 1988 to 1998. He was chairman of the Budget and Economic Legislative Committee from 1983 to 1993. Among his achievements were an innovative law for the youth (Jugendförderungsgesetz), one for family support and the first Italian law for animal protection. His most important work was the creation of a complementary pension system called Pens Plan for inhabitants of the Trentino South-Tyrol Region, whose activities he developed and coordinated starting from 1989.In 2001, he was elected to the Italian Senate as representative of the Südtiroler Volkspartei in an electoral cooperation with the Ulivo party. He was re-elected in 2006 in cooperation with Romano Prodis coalition and 2008 in cooperation with the Partito Democratico, which itself is a successor party to the Ulivo and the Unione of Prodi parties: 2001 (SVP-Ulivo), 2006 (SVP-Unione) and 2008 (SVP-Autonomie).

He has been the President of the parliamentary group "Per le Autonomie" from 2006 to 2008. From 2001 to 2006 he has been member of the presidency of the legislative Committee for Welfare, from 2008 to 2013 also for School and Culture, and from 2006 to 2013 a member (at times Deputy Member) of the Committee for Constitutional Affairs of the Italian Senate. He is member of the parliamentary delegation of the Central European Initiative and President of its Cultural Commission.

== Achievements ==
Oskar Peterlini is the projector of the complementary pension system in the Trentino-Alto Adige/Südtirol region named Pensplan. In a collaboration between the region, unions and management he initiated the Pensplan system, which includes the service company of the Region called Centrum Pensplan, the pension founds Laborfonds and Plurifonds and the fund management company Pensplan Invest.

== Publications ==
Peterlini is the author of several books and publications relating to the Italian Constitution, the Special Statute of the Autonomous Region of Trentino South-Tyrol, about Federalism, Electoral Systems and about the New Complementary Pension System in Italy and in the Trentino South-Tyrol Region.

=== Links for reading and downloads ===
- Publications by Oskar Peterlini, Academia.edu
- Publications by Oskar Peterlini, Issuu
- Books and publications by Oskar Peterlini in Bibliothekskatalog: Dr. Friedrich Teßmann Library in Bozen - South Tyrol
- Literature by and about Oskar Peterlini in the German National Library catalogue
- Literature about Oskar Peterlini in Academia.edu

=== Federalism, autonomy ===
- Autonomie als Friedenslösung, Südtirol am Prüfstand und im Vergleich - Stärken, Schwächen und Merkmale einer idealen Autonomie, (Autonomy as a Peace Solution, South Tyrol on the Test Bench and in Comparison - Strengths, Weaknesses and Characteristics of an Ideal Autonomy), updated and revised version of the habilitation thesis for the Facultas Docendi, awarded by the Institute for Political and Administrative Sciences of the University of Rostock, Facultas Verlag, Vienna; Nomos Verlag, Baden-Baden, 2023; ISBN 978-3-7089-2391-8 (Facultas), ISBN 978-3-7560-1199-5 (Nomos).
- Autonomy - Model for Conflict Resolution? Åland and South Tyrol - 100 Years in a Foreign State – Comparison and Conclusions, Nomos - le Attualità nel diritto, Roma, n. 1/2022. ISSN 2279-7238.
- Austria-Italy 1992 - Dispute Settlement to South Tyrol before the UNO, the Council of Europe and the International Court of Justice,- Republication of the original documents and the diplomatic notes on the occasion of the 25th anniversary, 2017, Excerpts from: Peterlini, O.: Autonomy and the Protection of Ethnic Minorities in Trentino-South Tyrol, Vienna 1997. ISBN 88-900077-2-9.
- Italien und Österreich vor der UNO: Dokumente und Originalzitate zur friedlichen Beilegung eines langwierigen Streites, in Raffeiner, A. (ed): 25 Jahre Streitbeilegung 1992-2017 - Ist das "Südtirolproblem" gelöst?! Dr.-Kovač-Verlag, Hamburg 2018, ISSN 1613-0979, ISBN 978-3-8300-9975-8.
- Italien – Aufbruch zur Mehrheitsdemokratie? Verfassungsreformen, Wahlgesetze und Verfassungsgerichtsurteile, Zeitschrift für Parlamentsfragen ZParl, 4/ 2017, Ed: Deutsche Vereinigung für Parlamentsfragen, Berlin. ISSN 0340-1758.
- Foundations and Institutions of South-Tyrol’s Autonomy in Italy, in Ghai, Y./ Woodman, S. (eds): Practising Self-Government: a comparative study of autonomous regions. Cambridge University Press, Cambridge 2013. ISBN 978-11-0701-858-7.
- Südtirols Autonomie und die Verfassungsreformen Italiens, Vom Zentralstaat zu föderalen Ansätzen: die Auswirkungen und ungeschriebenen Änderungen im Südtiroler Autonomiestatut (South Tyrol Autonomy and the Constitutional Reforms in Italy - The constitutional debate about new forms of democratic participation, the long road of Italy from the centralized state to timid federal principles, the direct interference with the autonomy statute, which formally has remained unchanged, New Academic Press (Braumüller) Wien 2012. ISBN 978-3-7003-1834-7.
- Come riformare la costituzione e i diritti. Considerazioni, disegni di legge e mozioni per una società più equa (How to reform the constitution and the rights - considerations, bills and motions for a more equitable society,) Prokopp & Hechensteiner, St. Pauls/Eppan (Bolzano) 2012. ISBN 978-88-6069-014-2.
- Instruments for Direct Democracy in Italy/Strumenti di democrazia diretta in Italia, in Acts of Conference: Participatory Democracy and social Development, Free University of Bozen/Bolzano, Campus Brixen, Italy, 6.-8. September 2012, International Conference of ICSD (International Consortium for Social Development) European Branch and Free University of Bozen/Bolzano, Prokopp & Hechensteiner, St. Pauls Bozen 2012. ISBN 978-88-6069-013-5.
- Steuerföderalismus in Italien, Spannungsfeld zwischen Verfassungszielen und Sparmaßnahmen, zwischen Nord und Süd (Fiscal federalism in Italy, tension between constitutional objectives and austerity measures, between North and South), Prokopp & Hechensteiner, St. Pauls Bozen 2012. ISBN 978-88-6069-011-1.
- The Structure of the State – an Instrument of Peace? The South Tyrol Minority as an Example. L’assetto dello Stato – uno strumento di pace? L’esempio della minoranza sudtirolese, 26–28 April 2012 in Bolzano-Bozen, Prokopp & Hechensteiner, San Paolo 2012. ISBN 978-88-6069-012-8.
- L’autonomia – strumento di pace (Autonomy - an instrument of peace), in Provenzano, F.M.: Federalismo, Devolution, Secessione – La storia continua. Ritorno al futuro, Editore Pellegrini Cosenza, 2011. ISBN 978-88-8101-778-2.
- Imparare dalla storia per costruire la pace (Learning from history for peace), Introduzione e cenni storici, in Scagnetti, G. (2011): Accadde al confine: storie di Giovanni Postal e Udo Grobar, La Feltrinelli Milano 2011. ISBN 978-88-910150-4-4.
- Föderalismus und Autonomien in Italien, Federalismo e Autonomie in Italia, in German and Italian with English summary, The effects of federal development in Italy on special autonomy, and especially on the Statute of the Trentino Alto Adige Südtirol, PhD Thesis, Leopold Franzens University, Faculty of Political Science and Sociology, Innsbruck 2010.
- Secessione, riforma costituzionale, Senato federale, devolution, federalismo fiscale e sicurezza (The projects of the Lega in the light of the autonomy), in Provenzano, F.M.: Dall’interno della Lega – Testi e documenti per conoscere tutto della Lega Nord, Presse libre Italia, stampa Lito Terrazzi Cascine del Riccio, Firenze 2010. ISBN 978-88-96964-00-2.
- Mit Herz und Seele für Österreich und Südtirol, Mit Klecatsky durch Erlebnisse und Geschichte, Recht und Politik, in: Raffeiner, A./ Matscher, F./ Pernthaler, P.: Ein Leben für Recht und Gerechtigkeit, FS für Hans Richard Klecatsky zum 90.Geburtstag, Neuer Wissenschaftlicher Verlag Wien 2010. ISBN 978-3-7083-0705-3.
- The South-Tyrol Autonomy in Italy, Historical, Political and Legal Aspects. In: Oliveira J./Cardinal P. (edit.) (2009): One Country, Two Systems, Three Legal Orders – Perspectives of Evolution, Springer. ISBN 978-3-540-68571-5, DOI: 10.1007/978-3-540-68572-2.
- Südtirols Vertretung am Faden Roms. Die Auswirkungen von Wahlsystemen auf ethnische Minderheiten am Beispiel Südtirols in Rom von 1921–2013, in: Hilpold P. (ed) (2009): Minderheitenschutz in Italien, Reihe Ethnos 70, Braumüller Wien. ISBN 978-3-7003-1694-7.
- Die Föderalismusentwicklung in Italien und ihre Auswirkungen auf die Sonderautonomien (The development of federalism in Italy and the effects on the special autonomies), Zeitschrift für Öffentliches Recht (ZÖR 63), Springer, Wien 2008. DOI 10.1007/S00708-008-0209-6, ISSN 0948-4396 (Print) 1613–7663
- Evoluzione in senso federale e riforma costituzionale in Italia (The development of federalism in Italy and the constitutional reform)it, FÖDOK 27, Institut für Föderalismus, Innsbruck 2008. ISBN 978-3-901965-26-5
- Föderalistische Entwicklung und Verfassungsreform in Italien, FÖDOK 25, Institut für Föderalismus, Innsbruck 2007. ISBN 978-3-901965-24-1 ().
- Autonomie und Minderheitenschutz in Südtirol und im Trentino (Autonomy and the Protection of Ethnic Minorities in Trentino-South Tyrol), Region Trentino-Südtirol, Bozen-Trient 1996, ISBN 88-900077-0-2, Neuausgabe: Braumüller, Wien 1997, ISBN 3-7003-1166-4. Neuauflage: Region Trentino-Südtirol, Bozen-Trient 2000, ISBN 88-900077-4-5
- Autonomy and the Protection of Ethnic Minorities in Trentino-South Tyrol – An Overview of the History, Law and Politics, Braumüller, Wien 1997, ISBN 3-7003-1173-7
- Autonomia e tutela delle minoranze nel Trentino-Alto Adige (Autonomy and the Protection of Ethnic Minorities in Trentino-South Tyrol), Consiglio della Regione Autonoma del Trentino Alto Adige, Bolzano Trento 1996, ISBN 88-900077-1-0. Neuauflage 2000, ISBN 88-900077-9-6
- Aspetti e problemi dello Statuto di Autonomia, (Aspects and problems of the Autonomy Statute) in: "La storia dell'Alto Adige", Istituto Magistrale Italiano, Bolzano 1980. New edition 1989.
- Il Sudtirolo, una prova d'esame per l'Europa / Südtirol – ein Prüfstein für Europa (German, Italian), in Demarchi, F. (a cura di): Minoranze linguistiche fra storia e politica / Sprachliche Minderheiten zwischen Geschichte und Politik, Gruppo Culturale CIVIS, Biblioteca Cappuccini, CIVIS.Studi e Testi, Supplemento 4/1988, Trento, pp. 113–144.
- Der ethnische Proporz in Südtirol (The ethnic proportion in South Tyrol), Athesia, Bozen 1980. ISBN 88-7014-185-3

=== Electoral systems ===
- Minderheitenschutz und Wahlsysteme, Die Spielregeln von Wahlsystemen und ihre Auswirkungen auf Sprachminderheiten - Südtirol und europäische Minderheiten im Blickfeld (Protection of minorities and electoral systems, the rules of electoral systems and their implications for linguistic minorities - An analysis based on empirical experiences of South Tyrolean and other ethnic minorities in Europe), New Academic Press (ex Braumüller) Wien 2012. ISBN 978-3-7003-1835-4.
- Mehrheitswahlrecht contra Proporz, Die Senatswahlkreise in Südtirol 1988 – 2012 (Majority voting system versus proportional representation, the Senate constituencies in South Tyrol 1988 – 2012), Prokopp & Hechensteiner, St. Pauls Bozen 2012. ISBN 978-88-6069-009-8.
- Funzionamento dei sistemi elettorali e minoranze linguistiche (Electoral Systems and Linguistic Minorities), FrancoAngeli, Milano 2012. ISBN 978-88-568-4455-9. *
- Sistemi elettorali e minoranze linguistiche, Wahlsysteme und Sprachminderheiten, in German and Italian, The impact of electoral systems on minority representation in Parliament following the example of linguistic minorities in South Tyrol Südtirol, research projects at the Faculty of Political Science at the Leopold Franzens Universität Innsbruck 2010. *
- Südtirols Vertretung am Faden Roms, (The South Tyrolean Representation on the string of Rome – the effects of electoral systems on an ethnic minorities) Die Auswirkungen von Wahlsystemen auf ethnische Minderheiten am Beispiel Südtirols in Rom von 1921–2013, in: Hilpold P. (ed) (2009): Minderheitenschutz in Italien, Reihe Ethnos 70, Braumüller Wien. ISBN 978-3-7003-1694-7 ISSN 0425-4600:
- Südtirols Vertretung in Rom (The South Tyrolean Representation in Rome, short version about the effects of electoral systems) Die Auswirkungen von Wahlsystemen auf ethnische Minderheiten, Europa Ethnica 3/4, S. 97–106, Braumüller, Wien 2008, ISSN 0014-2492:;

=== Social security and pension funds ===
- Le nuovi pensioni (The new pensions – experiences and strategies to avoid the pension crash). FrancoAngeli, Mailand 2003. ISBN 88-464-4202-4
- Come cambia la tutela previdenziale: un’esperienza locale (How is changing the social security). In: I giovani e la previdenza complementare. Atti del convegno, 17 settembre 2003 a Bologna. Covip Bollettino Quaderno n. 4, Roma.
- Zukunft planen (Planning the future), Athesia, Bozen 2000. ISBN 88-8266-089-3
- Pianificare il futuro(Planning the future), Athesia, Bolzano 2000. ISBN 88-8266-091-5.
- Assicurarsi il futuro, Zukunft sichern (Assuring the future) (German, Italian) Centrum PensPlan, Bolzano 1998.
- Das Familienpaket, Il pacchetto famiglia (The family package) (German, Italian) Casse Rurali dell'Alto Adige, Bolzano, 3 parts, 1992 and 1993.

=== Economy ===
- Die totale Privatisierung. Ein gescheiterter Wahn/ La privatizzazione totale. Una pazzia fallita (The total privatization - A failed delusion), Vortrag/ relazione, Autonome Gewerkschaftsorganisation der Gebietskörperschaften/ Organizzazione Sindacale Autonoma degli enti locali AGO, 4. Landeskongress zum Thema: Öffentlicher Dienst im Würgegriff der Privatisierung/ 4. Congresso provinciale sul tema: Servizi pubblici nella morsa della privatizzazione 9.4. 2010, Bozen. Prokopp & Hechensteiner, St. Pauls-Bozen 2012. ISBN 978-88-6069-010-4.
- Relazioni al bilancio provinciale (Record to the provincial budget) (German, Italian), annuali, come Presidente della Commissione Bilancio, Finanze ed Economia del Consiglio provinciale dell'Alto Adige, dal 1984 al 1994.
- Il bilancio della Provincia – uno strumento politico – economico (The provincial budget – a political economic instrument) (German, Italian), Consiglio della Provincia autonoma, Bolzano 1990.
- Quantitativer und qualitativer Bedarf an Arbeitskräften im öffentlichen Dienst in Südtirol (The quantitative and qualitative demand of employer in the public ministration), University of Innsbruck, Thesis, 1979.

=== Politics ===
- Ein Visionär der alten Schule, in Benedikter, T.: Den Grundsätzen treu geblieben, Alfons Benedikters Wirken für Südtirol im Spiegel der Erinnerung, Prokopp & Hechensteiner KG St. Pauls Bolzano 2012. ISBN 978-88-6069-008-1.
