= 2006 Italian general election in Trentino-Alto Adige/Südtirol =

The Italian general election of 2006 took place on 10–11 April 2006.

In Trentino the centre-left came first narrowly ahead of the centre-right, as it happened nationally, while in South Tyrol the South Tyrolean People's Party led the centre-left to a major victory, but lost almost 10% of the vote from 2001 due to the alliance with Italian parties.

== Results ==
=== Chamber of Deputies ===
==== Trentino ====
Coalition leader	votes	votes (%)	Party	votes	votes (%)
Romano Prodi	165,413	50.1	The Olive Tree: Democracy is Freedom – The Daisy; Democrats of the Left	99,131	30.0
Romano Prodi	165,413	50.1	South Tyrolean People's Party	16,738	5.1
Romano Prodi	165,413	50.1	Communist Refoundation Party	14,834	4.5
Romano Prodi	165,413	50.1	Italy of Values	8,923	2.7
Romano Prodi	165,413	50.1	Federation of the Greens	8,368	2.5
Romano Prodi	165,413	50.1	Rose in the Fist: Italian Democratic Socialists; Italian Radicals	7,451	2.3
Romano Prodi	165,413	50.1	Party of Italian Communists	4,774	1.5
Romano Prodi	165,413	50.1	Pensioners' Party	3,994	1.2
Romano Prodi	165,413	50.1	others	1,200	0.4
Silvio Berlusconi	164,036	49.7	Forza Italia	76,355	23.1
Silvio Berlusconi	164,036	49.7	National Alliance	30,773	9.3
Silvio Berlusconi	164,036	49.7	Lega Nord	25,947	7.9
Silvio Berlusconi	164,036	49.7	Union of Christian and Centre Democrats	25,819	7.8
Silvio Berlusconi	164,036	49.7	Tricolour Flame	2,264	0.7
Silvio Berlusconi	164,036	49.7	others	2,878	0.9
Others	529	0.2	others	529	0.2
Total coalitions	329,978	100.0	Total parties	329,978	100.0

Source: Ministry of the Interior

==== South Tyrol ====
Coalition leader	votes	votes (%)	Party	votes	votes (%)
Romano Prodi	231,935	74.6	South Tyrolean People's Party	165,966	53.4
Romano Prodi	231,935	74.6	The Olive Tree: Democracy is Freedom – The Daisy; Democrats of the Left	33,458	10.8
Romano Prodi	231,935	74.6	Federation of the Greens	16,753	5.4
Romano Prodi	231,935	74.6	Communist Refoundation Party	4,711	1.5
Romano Prodi	231,935	74.6	Rose in the Fist: Italian Democratic Socialists; Italian Radicals	3,915	1.3
Romano Prodi	231,935	74.6	Italy of Values	3,315	1.1
Romano Prodi	231,935	74.6	Party of Italian Communists	2,127	0.7
Romano Prodi	231,935	74.6	others	1,609	0.5
Silvio Berlusconi	62,344	20.1	Forza Italia	30,323	9.8
Silvio Berlusconi	62,344	20.1	National Alliance	21,366	6.9
Silvio Berlusconi	62,344	20.1	Union of Christian and Centre Democrats	5,342	1.7
Silvio Berlusconi	62,344	20.1	Lega Nord	2,809	0.9
Silvio Berlusconi	62,344	20.1	others	2,504	0.8
Pius Leitner	16,654	5.4	Die Freiheitlichen	16,654	5.4
Total coalitions	310,933	100.0	Total parties	310,933	100.0

Source: Ministry of the Interior

=== Senate of the Republic ===
Vote in Trentino

Party	Votes	%	Seats
The Union – SVP	141,168	47.66	2
House of Freedoms	124,875	42.16	1
Pensioners' Party	13,218	4.46	–
Tricolour Flame	9,632	3.25	–
Autonomist People's Union	7,327	2.47	–
Total	296,220	100.00	3
Valid votes	296,220	94.91	
Invalid/blank votes	15,885	5.09	
Total votes	312,105	100.00	
Registered voters/turnout	357,010	87.42	
Source: Ministry of the Interior

Vote in South Tyrol

Party	Votes	%	Seats
South Tyrolean People's Party	117,495	42.34	2
The Union – SVP	56,988	20.54	1
House of Freedoms	50,264	18.11	–
The Union	27,628	9.96	–
Die Freiheitlichen	16,765	6.04	–
Tricolour Flame	5,187	1.87	–
Pensioners' Party	3,163	1.14	–
Total	277,490	100.00	3
Valid votes	277,490	95.44	
Invalid/blank votes	13,250	4.56	
Total votes	290,740	100.00	
Registered voters/turnout	329,884	88.13	
Source: Ministry of the Interior
