= Gianclaudio Bressa =

Italian politician (1956–2026)

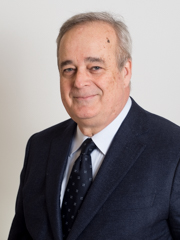
- Bressa in 2018

Member of the Chamber of Deputies
- In office 9 May 1996 – 22 March 2018

Personal details
- Born: 16 January 1956 Belluno, Italy
- Died: 18 May 2026 (aged 70) Florence, Italy
- Party: Democratic Party
- Occupation: Politician, business consultant

Gianclaudio Bressa (16 January 1956 – 18 May 2026) was an Italian politician who was a senator of the Republic for the Democratic Party from 2018 until 2022.

Bressa was mayor of Belluno from 22 December 1990 to 7 June 1993, several times undersecretary of state in the Presidency of the Council of Ministers, deputy in the Chamber of Deputies for five legislatures (XIII, XIV, XV, XVI and XVII) and held various parliamentary offices.

== Political career ==
Bressa was Undersecretary to the Presidency of the Council in the first Massimo D'Alema government and in the second Amato government, dealing mainly with regulations to protect linguistic minorities and special autonomies, civil service and regional affairs, and drafting, as part of the reform of Title V of the Constitution, the new paragraph 3 of Article 116 dedicated to differentiated autonomy.

After confirming his seat in Montecitorio in the 2001 political elections, on the Margherita lists, he was vice-chairman of the Constitutional Affairs Commission. In 2005 he wrote the book That "ugly mess" of constitutional reform. 164 reasons not to want it, in reference to the House of Freedoms attempt at constitutional reform. The volume collects 164 speeches delivered in the courtroom, and has been described as vaguely self-celebratory.

He was elected to the Chamber of Deputies for the third time in 2006 with the Ulivo list, in the Trentino-Alto Adige-Südtirol constituency. He was chairman of the Commission of the Six for the Autonomy of the Autonomous Province of Bolzano and one of the vice-chairmen of the Democratic Party parliamentary group.

In the 2013 parliamentary elections in Italy, he was elected to the Chamber of Deputies as the chief candidate from the Democratic Party list in the Trentino-South Tyrol constituency. On that occasion, he was the architect of the electoral agreement between the PD and South Tyrolean People's Party.

A member of the Joint Commission for the Implementation Standards of the Statute of Trentino-South Tyrol, he became its chairman on 4 February 2014.

On 28 February 2014, he was appointed undersecretary for Regional Affairs, a position he left on 12 December 2016, when at the same time he became undersecretary to the Prime Minister's Office in the Paolo Gentiloni government. Following the resignation of Regional Affairs Minister Enrico Costa, he assumed the post on 26 July 2017.

In the 2018 general elections, he was a candidate in the uninominal constituency of Bolzano for the Senate of the Republic, for the center-left coalition in the PD quota, and was elected senator with 43% of the vote against the center-right candidate in the Lega quota Massimo Bessone (25.45%) and the 5-Star Movement's Diego Nicolini (20.28%), thanks in part to an agreement with the South Tyrolean People's Party. 10 days before the political elections, 14 members of the South Tyrolean PD announced their exit from the PD, due to the "candidacy imposed from above" of Bressa and Maria Elena Boschi.

In the 18th legislature, he joined the pParliamentary group For the Autonomies (with South Tyrolean People's Party, Trentino Tyrolean Autonomist Party and Valdostan Union), despite being a member of the Democratic Party.

Bressa announced that he would not run again in the 2022 general elections, leaving parliament after more than 26 years.

== Death ==
Bressa died in Florence on 18 May 2026, at the age of 70.
