= South Tyrolean People's Party =

South Tyrolean People's Party Südtiroler Volkspartei
- Chairman: Dieter Steger
- Secretary: Harald Stauder
- Founded: 8 May 1945; 81 years ago
- Preceded by: Deutscher Verband (not legal predecessor)
- Headquarters: Brennerstraße 7/A, Bolzano
- Newspaper: ZIS
- Youth wing: Junge Generation
- Membership (2015): 40,000
- Ideology: Regionalism; German and Ladin minority interests; Christian democracy; Social democracy (minority)
- Political position: Centre
- European affiliation: European People's Party
- European Parliament group: European People's Party Group
- Colors: Black Red
- Chamber of Deputies: 3 / 400
- Senate: 2 / 205
- European Parliament: 1 / 76
- Landtag of South Tyrol: 13 / 35
- Conference of Regions: 1 / 21

Website
- svp.eu

The South Tyrolean People's Party (German: Südtiroler Volkspartei, SVP; Italian: Partito Popolare Sudtirolese, PPST) is a regionalist and mostly Christian-democratic political party in South Tyrol, an autonomous province with a German-speaking majority in northern Italy. Dieter Steger has been party leader since 2024, while party member Arno Kompatscher has been governor of South Tyrol since 2014.

Founded on 8 May 1945, the SVP has roots in the Deutscher Verband, a confederation of German-speaking parties formed in 1919 after the annexation of South Tyrol by Italy, which shared many of the same leading figures as the early SVP. An ethnic catch-all party, the SVP is aimed at representing South Tyrol's German-speaking population, as well as Ladin speakers. It is mainly Christian-democratic, but nevertheless quite diverse, including conservatives, liberals and social democrats. The party also gives special attention to the interests of farmers, which make up a good deal of its electorate, especially in Alpine valleys.

From 1948 to 2013, the party retained an absolute majority in the Landtag of South Tyrol (Provincial Council). Its best result was 67.8% in the 1948 provincial election, its worst 34.5% in the 2023 provincial election. The SVP had a long-lasting alliance with Christian Democracy (plus the Italian Democratic Socialist Party or the Italian Socialist Party) and, since 1994, with some of its successor parties, including the Italian People's Party and the Democratic Union of Alto Adige, as well as the Democratic Party of the Left and, later, the Democrats of the Left and the Democratic Party. That coalition lasted 25 years, until the party chose to team up with Lega Alto Adige Südtirol, local section of Lega Nord / Lega, in 2019. The coalition was enlarged to the Brothers of Italy, Die Freiheitlichen and The Civic List after the 2023 provincial election.

The SVP has a sister party in Trentino, the Trentino Tyrolean Autonomist Party (PATT). In the Italian Parliament the SVP teams up with other regionalist parties, notably including the Valdostan Union from Aosta Valley, while at the European level it is a member of the European People's Party (EPP) and has recently formed electoral pacts with Forza Italia, Italy's main EPP member.

== Recent history ==
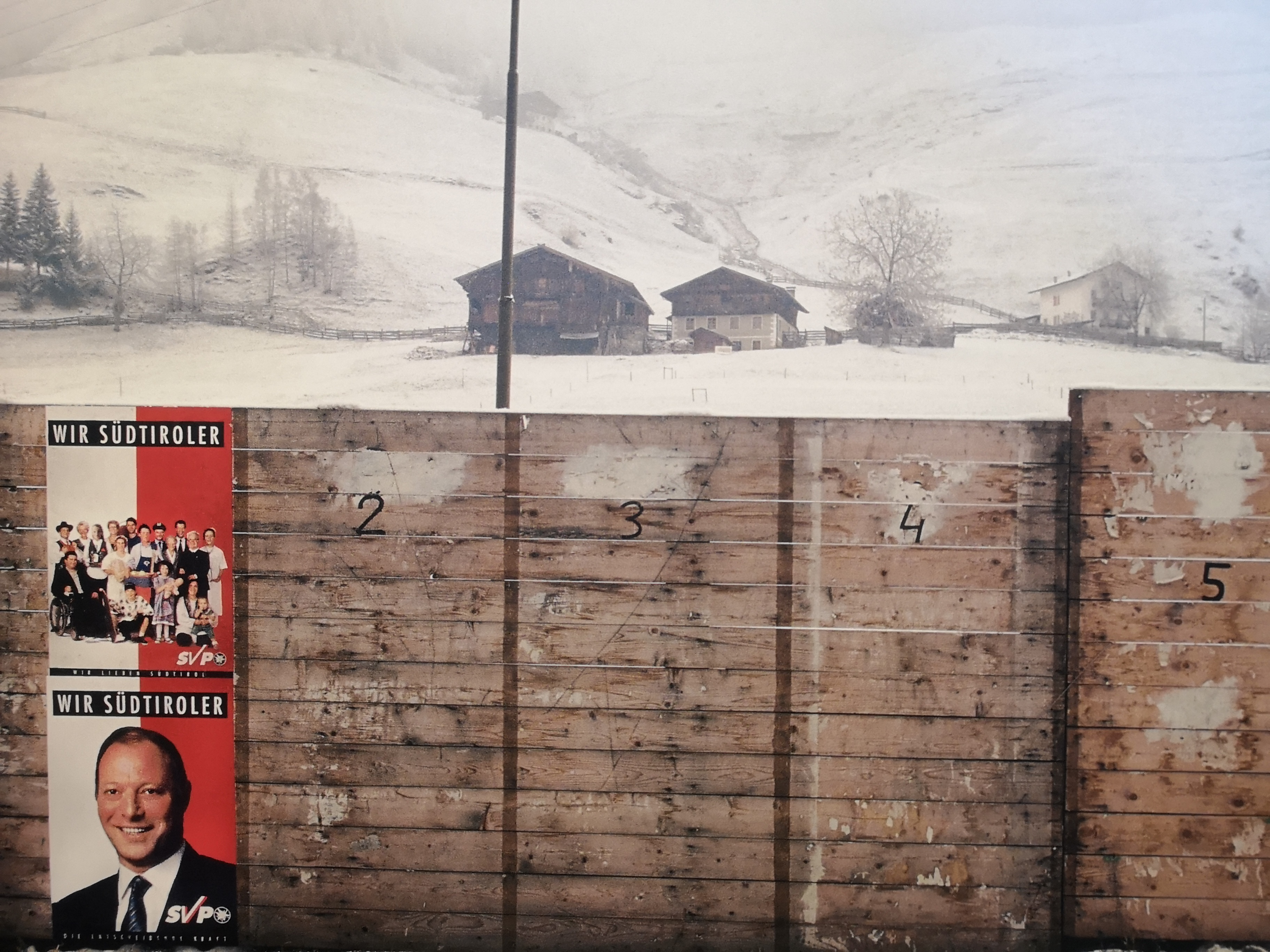
SVP poster in Sarntal, 1993

In 1989, Silvius Magnago, long-time SVP leader and governor of South Tyrol since 1960, handed his office to Luis Durnwalder, who would keep the post until 2013. Under Durnwalder's long reign, the SVP continued to be the largest party in the Province, garnering more than 50% of the vote in most elections, despite growing competition, chiefly from right-wing parties, i.e. the Union for South Tyrol and Die Freiheitlichen. Most importantly, Durnwalder managed to keep the party, often riven in internal disputes between opposing factions, united.

The SVP joined the European People's Party as an observer member in 1993 and became a full member later.

In the 1996 and 2001 general election, the SVP was affiliated to The Olive Tree, on the Populars for Prodi list (led by the Italian People's Party) and on its own list, respectively.

=== 2003–2006 elections ===
In the 2003 provincial election, the SVP won 55.6% of the vote and 21 provincial councillors out of 35. Durnwalder, governor since 1989, was returned for the fourth time in office, in coalition composed by the Democrats of the Left (DS) and the Democratic Union of Alto Adige.

In the 2004 European Parliament election, the SVP formed an electoral alliance with The Olive Tree joint list, including the DS. The party's share of votes fell below 50% for the first time, to 46.7% (–9.3pp from 1999, mainly because of the big win of the Greens (13.2%, +6.5%). However, Michl Ebner was elected MEP with more than 90,000 preferences and a Green, Sepp Kusstatscher (a former member of the internal left of the SVP), was elected too, the first time that the province had two MEPs.

Also in 2004, the centrist Siegfried Brugger, party chairman since 1992, stepped down and was replaced by Elmar Pichler Rolle, another centrist.

In the 2006 general election, the party was part of the victorious The Union centre-left coalition, and garnered four deputies, including one for its sister-party in Trentino, the Trentino Tyrolean Autonomist Party (PATT) – long-serving Siegfried Brugger, Karl Zeller, Johann Georg Widmann and PATT's Giacomo Bezzi –, and three senators – Helga Thaler Ausserhofer (representing the party's conservative wing), Oskar Peterlini (from the party's social-democratic faction) and Manfred Pinzger.

=== 2008–2009 elections ===
In the 2008 general election, the party obtained 44.3% (–9.1pp from 2006 and –16.2pp from 2001), returning only two deputies, Siegfried Brugger and Karl Zeller. In the Senate election, thanks to the plurality voting system, the SVP got its three senators – Helga Thaler Ausserhofer, Oskar Peterlini and Manfred Pinzger – re-elected. The low number of elects in the Chamber was due both to the strong showing of Die Freiheitlichen (9.4%) on the right and the decision not to enter in alliance for the Chamber of Deputies either with the centre-left led by the Democratic Party (PD, 18.0%) – successor of the DS – or the centre-right led by The People of Freedom (PdL,16.0%).

In the 2008 provincial election, the SVP won 48.1% of the vote in the province (–7.5%), while its right-wing rivals (The Freedomites, South Tyrolean Freedom and Union for South Tyrol) gained a combined 21.5% of the vote. During the electoral campaign the party did not endorse its traditional counterparts in Trentino (the Daisy Civic List/Union for Trentino, UpT, and the PATT), in order not to hurt the relations with Lega Nord (LN), whose Trentino section, Lega Trentino, provided the opposition candidate, Sergio Divina, who was however defeated Despite rumors on an alliance with Lega Alto Adige Südtirol, after the election the SVP continued its alliance with the PD, which was the largest party in Trentino.

In April 2009, Richard Theiner, a member of the Arbeitnehmer ("employees") left-leaning wing, was elected party chairman, due to an agreement between the opposing factions. Since then he was assisted by three deputy chairpersons: Thomas Widmann (Wirtschaft or "business" faction), Martha Stocker and Paola Bioc Gasser (representative of the Ladin section). The latter was replaced by Daniel Alfreider in 2012. Widmann would later leave the party in 2023.

In the 2009 European Parliament election, due to the absence of its rival parties on the right, the SVP won 52.1% of the vote, electing Herbert Dorfmann.

=== 2013–2014 elections ===
The SVP contested the 2013 general election as part of the centre-left coalition, Italy. Common Good. Some long-serving MPs, notably Siegfried Brugger and Helga Thaler Ausserhofer, chose not to run for re-election and the party selected its candidates through a primary election.

In the general election, the SVP won 44.2% of the provincial vote (–0.1pp from 2008) and, being part of the coalition winning the national majority premium, obtained five deputies: Albrecht Plangger, Renate Gebhard, Daniel Alfreider, PATT's Mauro Ottobre and Manfred Schullian. For the Senate, the SVP ran alone in the constituencies of Merano and Brixen, winning both: in Merano outgoing deputy Karl Zeller took 53.5%, while in Brixen Hans Berger 55.4%. The SVP, in alliance with the PD, the UpT and the PATT, contributed also to the election of centre-left or autonomist candidates in the constituency of Bolzano and in those of Trentino.

On 21 April, in a party primary, the SVP selected Arno Kompatscher as its head of the list for the 2013 provincial election, in place of Durnwalder. Kompatscher, 42-year-old mayor of Völs am Schlern, won 82.4% of the vote, while former SVP leader Elmar Pichler Rolle a mere 17.6%.

In the October election, the SVP won 45.7% of the vote in the province (–2.4pp) and lost its 65-year-long absolute majority. Both the German right-wing parties (whose combined share of the vote was 27.2%, +5.7%) and the Greens (8.7%, +2.9%) gained votes. Kompatscher obtained more than 80,000 preference votes and was appointed governor, in coalition with the PD.

In May 2014, Theiner was replaced by Philipp Achammer as party's chairman. Daniel Alfreider, Zeno Christanell and Angelika Wiedmer were appointed vice chairpersons. Kompatscher and 28-year-old Achammer formed an entirely new leadership team and represented the party's renewal.

In the 2014 European Parliament election, the SVP won 48.0% of the vote in the province and Dorfmann was re-elected to the European Parliament.

=== 2018–2019 elections ===
The SVP, which again chose its candidates through a primary election, contested the 2018 general election in a joint list with the PATT, within the centre-left coalition. The German right-wing parties did not participate, leading the SVP to obtain 48.8% of the vote in the province (+4.6pp). However, due to the new electoral system, it secured four deputies, including one for the PATT, and three senators. For the Chamber, Plangger was elected in Meran (61.2%), Gebhard in Brixen (65.0%), Schullian and PATT's Emanuela Rossini from the PR list. For the Senate, Julia Unterberger was elected in Merano (61.1%), Meinhard Durnwalder in Brixen (66.5%) and Dieter Steger from the PR list. The SVP's support granted the election of PD's candidates for the Chamber and the Senate in Bolzano, but for the first time the centre-left lost badly in Trentino, where the LN – re-styled as "Lega" – became the largest party.

In the 2018 provincial election, incumbent governor Kompatscher was the party's leading candidate. In the election on 21 October 2018, the party gained 41.9% (–3.8pp). The PD, SVP's traditional ally, did so poorly that the SVP needed to find a new coalition partner: after long negotiations, the party chose to team up with Lega Alto Adige Südtirol in 2019. Additionally, for the 2019 European Parliament election, the party formed an electoral pact with the other two main members of the European People's Party (EPP) from Italy, Forza Italia (FI) and the Union of the Centre (UdC). In the event, the SVP garnered 46.5% of the vote in the province and Dorfmann was re-elected to the European Parliament.

=== 2022–2024 elections ===
In the 2022 general election, the SVP decided to run independently with PATT and the Trentino Project. In response, the centre-left coalition made deals with the Team K and Greens after this decision. The SVP obtained 44.1% (–4.7pp) of the vote at the provincial level. Fewer seats were at stake after the successful 2020 constitutional referendum. For the Chamber, Schullian was re-elected in Bolzano with 32.9%, Gebhard was re-elected in Brixen with 57.4% and incumbent senator Steger was elected from the PR list. For the Senate, the party's candidate narrowly lost in Bolzano, Unterberger was re-elected in Meran with 47.8% and Durnwalder was re-elected in Brixen with 46.1%.

In the 2023 provincial election, the party was reduced to 34.5% of the vote (–7.4pp), with Kompatscher as the most voted candidate. That was due to the competition from a number of right-wing and populist German-speaking parties (combined 25.0% of the vote), as well as the split of For South Tyrol with Widmann (3.4%). After the election, the SVP chose to pursue an alliance with the Brothers of Italy (FdI, 6.0%), Die Freiheitlichen (dF, 4.9%), Lega Alto Adige Südtirol (LAAST, 3.1%) and The Civic List (LC, 2.6%). Kompatscher, who favoured a centre-left coalition, stayed as governor. The new government was formed by eight ministers from the SVP and one each for FdI, dF and LAAST, while LC provided external support.

In May 2024, Steger was elected party leader, replacing Achammer.

In the run-up of the 2024 European Parliament election, the SVP confirmed its electoral pact with FI. In the event, the SVP garnered 47.0% of the vote in the province and Dorfmann was re-elected to the European Parliament.

== Ideology and factions ==
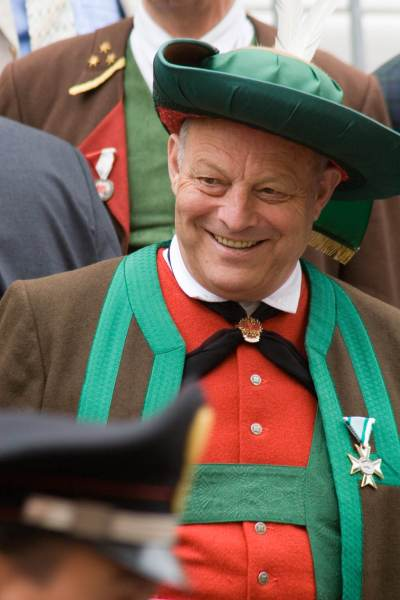
Luis Durnwalder

The SVP is an example of a catch-all party. Its ideology ranges from Christian democracy to social democracy, due to the virtual absence of a true social-democratic rival party in the region. In German-speaking valleys the SVP has had almost no opposition for decades.

The SVP is a member of the European People's Party (EPP), and its MEP sits in the EPP Group of the European Parliament.

In the years the SVP suffered many splits reflecting the diverse composition of the party (Tyrolean Homeland Party, Social Progressive Party of South Tyrol and Social Democratic Party of South Tyrol) and many SVP leading members left the party in order to join other parties, notably including Alfons Benedikter, a right-winger who launched the Union for South Tyrol in 1989, Christian Waldner, a conservative liberal who launched Die Freiheitlichen in 1992, Sepp Kusstatscher, a leftist who joined the Greens in 1999, and Roland Atz, who switched to Lega Alto Adige Südtirol in 2008. The Party of Independents/Freedom Party of South Tyrol, the South Tyrolean Homeland Federation, the Union for South Tyrol and Die Freiheitlichen can thus all be considered splits of the SVP.

Within the party it is possible to identify three official internal factions:

- Landwirtschaft (Agriculture), representing the interests of farmers and, usually, traditional and Catholic values; the faction, which has had in Luis Durnwalder, governor from 1989 to 2013, and Arno Kompatscher, governor since 2013, its main representatives in government, has featured in recent times Hans Berger, Herbert Dorfmann, Meinhard Durnwalder, Josef Noggler, Stefan Premstaller, Siegfried Rinner, Arnold Schuler and Manfred Schullian; as of 2023, the faction is the party's strongest and includes at least 5 provincial councillors out of 13, the party's MEP, 1 deputy out of 3 and 1 senator out of 2.
- Wirtschaft (Economy), representing small business; the faction has been led by Gerhard Brandstätter and has featured Daniel Alfreider, Manfred Pinzger, Dieter Steger, Helga Thaler Ausserhofer (a conservative) Thomas Widmann, Karl Zeller, as well as Landwirtschaft member Kompatscher (who has strong support from the faction); as of 2023, the faction includes the party's MEP, at least 3 provincial councillors out of 13, 1 deputy out of 3 and 1 senator out of 2.
- Arbeitnehmer (Labour), the social-democratic faction and political arm of the Union of South Tyrolean Independent Trade Unions (ASGB); the faction, currently led by Madgalena Amhof and previously led by Reinhold Perkmann, Rosmarie Pamer, and Cristoph Gufler, has featured Renate Gebhard, Oskar Peterlini, Richard Theiner, Martin Pircher and Harald Stauder (party secretary since 2024); as of 2023, the faction includes at least 4 provincial councillors out of 13 and 1 deputy out of 3.

In August 2018 a new faction, Plattform Heimat (Homeland Platform), was launched. The grouping represents the party's right-wing, which has been weakened over the years by the competition of several right-wing parties and is led by Michael Epp. Since 2023 the faction is represented by 2 provincial concillors out of 13.

Siegfried Brugger and Elmar Pichler Rolle, who led the party in 1992–2004 and 2004–2009 respectively, are centrist figures who worked for preserving internal unity. In order to prevent the party's break-up along right-left lines, in 2008 Perkmann, leader of the Arbeitnehmer, proposed a "federal reform" of the party in order to preserve its catch-all nature and simultaneously give more autonomy to its factions, which had been given an official status. The result was a mild reform of the party and the election to the party leadership in 2009 of a ticket composed by a leading member of the Arbeitnehmer, Richard Theiner, and a leading member of the Wirtschaft faction, Thomas Widmann, plus Martha Stocker, a close ally of Durnwalder. The internal divide was also displayed during the vote of confidence on Silvio Berlusconi's fourth government in 2008: Pinzger and Thaler Ausserhofer abstained, while Brugger, Zeller and Peterlini voted against.

Former chairman Philip Achammer is a member of the boards of all the three official factions.

The Young Generation (Junge Generation, JG) is the youth movement of the party, including all members at the age of 14 to 30.

== Popular support ==
View source data.

The electoral results of the SVP in South Tyrol since 1953 are shown in the table below.

=== Chamber of Deputies ===
1953	1958	1963	1968	1972	1976	1979	1983	1987	1992	1994	1996	2001	2006	2008	2013	2018	2022
59.9	60.8	56.6	58.5	59.0	59.6	62.9	59.6	58.3	57.2	59.9	52.7 (Note: This result refers to single-seat constituencies, as the SVP did not present its own party list for proportional representation, but was part of the list of the Italian People's Party (PPI), along with some other minor parties, at the national level. This list won only 27.9% in the Province of Bolzano.)	60.5	53.4	44.3	44.2	48.8	44.1

=== European Parliament ===
1979	1984	1989	1994	1999	2004	2009	2014	2019
62.1	63.1	53.0	56.9	56.0	46.7	52.1	48.0	46.5

== Election results ==
=== Landtag of South Tyrol ===
Landtag of South Tyrol
Election	Votes	%	Seats	+/−
1948	107,249	67.60	13 / 20	–
1952	112,602	64.81	15 / 22	▲2
1956	124,165	64.40	15 / 22	–
1960	132,351	63.92	15 / 22	–
1964	134,188	61.30	16 / 25	▲1
1968	137,982	60.74	16 / 25	–
1973	132,186	56.40	20 / 34	▲4
1978	163,502	61.35	21 / 34	▲1
1983	170,125	59.42	22 / 35	▲1
1988	184,717	60.40	22 / 35	–
1993	160,186	52.03	19 / 35	▼3
1998	171,820	56.62	21 / 35	▲2
2003	167,353	55.60	21 / 35	–
2008	146,545	48.12	18 / 35	▼3
2013	131,236	45.70	17 / 35	▼1
2018	119,108	41.89	15 / 35	▼2
2023	97,092	34.53	13 / 35	▼2

=== Italian Parliament ===
Chamber of Deputies
Election	Votes	%	Seats	+/−
1948	124,243	0.47	3 / 574	–
1953	122,474	0.45	3 / 590	–
1958	135,491	0.46	3 / 596	–
1963	135,457	0.44	3 / 630	–
1968	152,991	0.48	3 / 630	–
1972	153,674	0.46	3 / 630	–
1976	184,375	0.50	3 / 630	–
1979	204,899	0.56	3 / 630	–
1983	184,940	0.50	3 / 630	–
1987	202,022	0.52	3 / 630	–
1992	198,447	0.51	3 / 630	–
1994	231,842	0.60	3 / 630	–
1996	156,708	0.42	3 / 630	–
2001	200,059	0.54	3 / 630	–
2006	182,704	0.48	3 / 630	–
2008	147,718	0.41	2 / 630	▼1
2013	146,804	0.43	4 / 630	▲2
2018	134,651	0.41	4 / 630	–
2022	117,010	0.42	3 / 400	▼1

Senate of the Republic
Election	Votes	%	Seats	+/−
1948	94,406	0.42	2 / 237	–
1953	107,139	0.44	2 / 237	–
1958	120,068	0.46	2 / 246	–
1963	112,023	0.41	2 / 315	–
1968	131,071	0.46	2 / 315	–
1972	113,452	0.38	2 / 315	–
1976	158,584	0.50	2 / 315	–
1979	172,582	0.55	2 / 315	–
1983	157,444	0.51	2 / 315	–
1987	171,539	0.53	2 / 315	–
1992	168,113	0.50	3 / 315	▲1
1994	217,137	0.66	3 / 315	–
1996	178,425	0.55	2 / 315	▼1
2001	126,177	0.37	3 / 315	▲1
2006	117,495	0.46	3 / 315	–
2008	98,948	0.40	3 / 315	–
2013	97,141	0.41	2 / 315	▼1
2018	128,282	0.42	3 / 315	▲1
2022	116,003	0.42	2 / 200	▼1

=== European Parliament ===
Election	Leader	Votes	%	Seats	+/–	EP Group
1979	Silvius Magnago	196,373 (11th)	0.56	1 / 81	New	EPP
1984	Silvius Magnago	198,220 (9th)	0.56	1 / 81	0	EPP
1989	Silvius Magnago	172,383 (13th)	0.50	1 / 81	0	EPP
1994	Siegfried Brugger	202,668 (15th)	0.62	1 / 87	0	EPP
1999	Siegfried Brugger	156,005 (19th)	0.50	1 / 87	0	EPP-ED
2004	Elmar Pichler Rolle	146,357 (21st)	0.45	1 / 78	0	EPP-ED
2009	Richard Theiner	143,509 (13th)	0.47	1 / 72	0	EPP
2014	Philipp Achammer	138,037 (11th)	0.50	1 / 73	0	EPP
2019	Philipp Achammer	142,185 (11th)	0.53	1 / 76	0	EPP
2024	Dieter Steger	120,930 (11th)	0.52	1 / 76	0	EPP

== Leadership ==
- Chairman: Erich Amonn (1945–1948), Josef Menz-Popp (1948–1951), Toni Ebner (1951–1952), Otto von Guggenberg (1952–1954), Karl Tinzl (1954–1956), Toni Ebner (1956–1957), Silvius Magnago (1957–1991), Roland Riz (1991–1992), Siegfried Brugger (1992–2004), Elmar Pichler Rolle (2004–2009), Richard Theiner (2009–2014), Philipp Achammer (2014–2024), Dieter Steger (2024–present)
  - Honorary chairman: Silvius Magnago (1991–2010)
- Secretary: Josef Raffeiner (1945–1947), Otto von Guttenberg (1947–1952), Albuin Forer (1952–1953), Vinzenz Stötter (1953–1954), Ivo Perathoner (1954–1957), Hans Stanek (1957–1965), Josef Atz (1965–1978), Bruno Hosp (1978–1989), Hartmann Gallmetzer (1989–1997), Thomas Widmann, (1997–2003), Michael Mühlberger (2004), Alexander Mittermair (2004–2009), Philipp Achammer (2009–2013), Martin Alber (2013–2014), Manuel Massl (2014–2016), Gerhard Duregger (2017–2019), Stefan Premstaller (2019–2023), Martin Pircher (2023–2024), Harald Stauder (2024–present)

== Sources ==
- History of 60 years of the SVP, 1945–2005
- Provincial Council of Bolzano – Historical Archive
- Trentino Alto-Adige Region – Elections
- Provincial Government of Bolzano – Elections
- Cattaneo Institute – Archive of Election Data
- Ministry of the Interior – Historical Archive of Elections
- Günther Pallaver, Political parties in Alto Adige from 1945 to 2005
