= Landtag of South Tyrol =

Legislative organ of South Tyrol, Italy

Coordinates: 46.4978°N 11.3588°E

Landtag of South Tyrol Südtiroler Landtag Consiglio della Provincia autonoma di Bolzano Cunsëi dla Provinzia autonoma de Bulsan
- 17th legislature

Type
- Type: Unicameral
- Established: 20 December 1948

Leadership
- President: Josef Noggler, SVP since 13 November 2023

Structure
- Seats: 35
- Political groups: Government (18): SVP (13); FdI (2); DF (1); FI (1); LC (1); Opposition (17): TK (4); STF (4); Grüne (3); JWA (1); PD (1); FSmW (1); Vita (1); FF (1); WB (1)
- Length of term: 5 years

Elections
- Voting system: Party-list proportional representation
- Last election: 22 October 2023
- Next election: No later than 5 November 2028

Meeting place
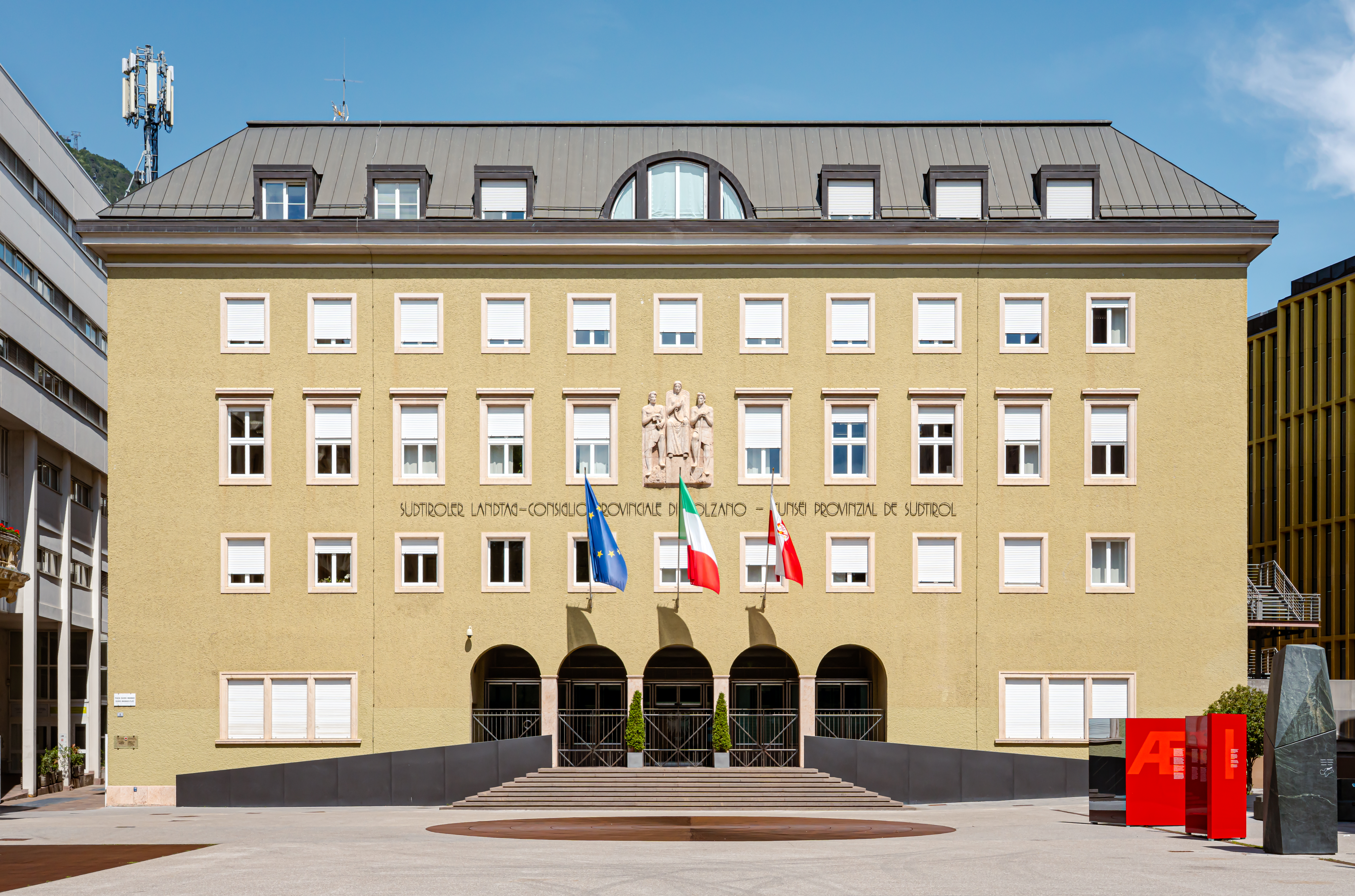
- Piazza Silvius Magnago, 1 Bolzano

Website
- www.landtag-bz.org

The Landtag of South Tyrol is the provincial council (German: Südtiroler Landtag; Italian: Consiglio della Provincia autonoma di Bolzano; Ladin: Cunsëi dla Provinzia autonoma de Bulsan) of the autonomous province of South Tyrol (Bolzano) in northeast Italy.

As a legislature it is responsible for passing laws at the provincial level and enacting the budget. It also elects the governor and controls the government of South Tyrol. The president (speaker) of the Landtag (German: Landtagspräsident; Italian: Presidente del Consiglio) since 13 November 2023 is Josef Noggler (SVP).

The council is elected for five-year terms. Its seats are assigned proportionally to each party and list. The last election was held on 22 October 2023.

The council is located in Piazza Silvius Magnago, Bolzano.

== Composition ==
=== Political groups (2023–2028) ===
The council is composed of the following political groups:

| Party | Seats | Status |
|---|---|---|
| South Tyrolean People's Party (SVP) | 13 / 35 | Government |
| Team K (TK) | 4 / 35 | Opposition |
| South Tyrolean Freedom (STF) | 4 / 35 | Opposition |
| Grüne | 3 / 35 | Opposition |
| Brothers of Italy (FdI) | 2 / 35 | Government |
| Die Freiheitlichen (DF) | 1 / 35 | Government |
| JWA List (JWA) | 1 / 35 | Opposition |
| Democratic Party (PD) | 1 / 35 | Opposition |
| Forza Italia (FI) | 1 / 35 | Government |
| The Civic List (LC) | 1 / 35 | Government |
| For South Tyrol with Widmann (FSmW) | 1 / 35 | Opposition |
| Vita | 1 / 35 | Opposition |
| Free Group (FF) | 1 / 35 | Opposition |
| Us Citizens (WB) | 1 / 35 | Opposition |

=== Historical composition ===
| Election | SVP | DC | PCI | PSI | MSI | VGV | DF | Others | Total |
|---|---|---|---|---|---|---|---|---|---|
| 28 November 1948 | 13 | 2 | 1 | 1 | 1 | | | 2 | 20 |
| 16 November 1952 | 15 | 3 | 1 | 1 | 1 | | | 1 | 22 |
| 11 November 1956 | 15 | 3 | 1 | 1 | 1 | | | 1 | 22 |
| 6 November 1960 | 15 | 3 | 1 | 1 | 1 | | | 1 | 22 |
| 15 November 1964 | 16 | 3 | 1 | 1 | 1 | | | 3 | 25 |
| 17 November 1968 | 16 | 4 | 1 | 2 | 1 | | | 1 | 25 |
| 18 November 1973 | 20 | 5 | 2 | 2 | 1 | | | 4 | 34 |
| 19 November 1978 | 21 | 4 | 3 | 1 | 1 | | | 4 | 34 |
| 20 November 1983 | 22 | 3 | 2 | 1 | 2 | | | 5 | 35 |
| 20 November 1988 | 22 | 3 | 1 | 1 | 4 | 2 | | 2 | 35 |
| 21 November 1993 | 19 | 2 | | | 4 | 2 | 2 | 6 | 35 |
| 22 November 1998 | 21 | | | | | 2 | 1 | 11 | 35 |

| Election | SVP | VGV | DF | STF | PD | Others | Total |
|---|---|---|---|---|---|---|---|
| 26 October 2003 | 21 | 3 | 2 | | | 9 | 35 |
| 26 October 2008 | 18 | 2 | 5 | 2 | 2 | 6 | 35 |
| 27 October 2013 | 17 | 3 | 6 | 3 | 2 | 4 | 35 |
| 21 October 2018 | 15 | 3 | 2 | 2 | 1 | 12 | 35 |
| 22 October 2023 | 13 | 3 | 2 | 4 | 1 | 12 | 35 |

== Presidents ==
This is a list of the Presidents of the council:

| Legislature | Name | Party | Period | |
|---|---|---|---|---|
| I (1948) | Silvius Magnago | SVP | 20 December 1948 | 29 December 1950 |
| I (1948) | Luigi Negri | DC | 30 December 1950 | 19 December 1952 |
| II (1952) | Silvius Magnago | SVP | 20 December 1952 | 19 December 1954 |
| II (1952) | Armando Bertorelle | DC | 20 December 1954 | 14 December 1956 |
| III (1956) | Silvius Magnago | SVP | 15 December 1956 | 22 December 1958 |
| III (1956) | Armando Bertorelle | DC | 23 December 1958 | 30 December 1960 |
| IV (1960) | Alois Pupp | SVP | 31 December 1960 | 14 December 1962 |
| IV (1960) | Silvio Nicolodi | PSI | 15 December 1962 | 14 December 1964 |
| V (1964) | Alois Pupp | SVP | 15 December 1964 | 14 December 1966 |
| V (1964) | Decio Molignoni | PSDI | 14 December 1966 | 15 November 1967 (Note: Resigned.) |
| V (1964) | Silvio Nicolodi | PSI | 15 November 1967 | 13 December 1968 |
| VI (1968) | Robert von Fioreschy | SVP | 14 December 1968 | 13 December 1970 |
| VI (1968) | Silvio Nicolodi | PSI | 14 December 1970 | 13 December 1973 |
| VII (1973) | Karl Vaja | SVP | 14 December 1973 | 16 June 1976 |
| VII (1973) | Decio Molignoni | PSDI | 16 June 1976 | 14 December 1978 |
| VIII (1978) | Joachim Dallas | SVP | 15 December 1978 | 26 July 1979 (Note: Resigned after being elected member of the European Parliament.) |
| VIII (1978) | Eric Achmüller | SVP | 26 July 1979 | 14 June 1981 |
| VIII (1978) | Giuseppe Sfondrini | PSI | 15 June 1981 | 13 December 1983 |
| IX (1983) | Eric Achmüller | SVP | 14 December 1983 | 7 May 1984 (Note: Resigned.) |
| IX (1983) | Waltraud Gebert-Deeg | SVP | 8 May 1984 | 16 June 1986 |
| IX (1983) | Rolando Boesso | PRI | 17 June 1986 | 13 December 1988 |
| X (1988) | Rosa Franzelin Werth | SVP | 14 December 1988 | 13 June 1991 |
| X (1988) | Alessandro Pellegrini | DC | 14 June 1991 | 16 February 1993 (Note: Resigned.) |
| X (1988) | Romano Viola | PDS | 16 February 1993 | 13 December 1993 |
| XI (1993) | Sabina Kasslatter Mur | SVP | 14 December 1993 | 13 June 1996 |
| XI (1993) | Umberto Montefiori | LN | 14 June 1996 | 17 December 1998 |
| XII (1998) | Hermann Thaler | SVP | 18 December 1998 | 17 June 2001 |
| XII (1998) | Alessandra Zendron | VGV | 18 June 2001 | 17 November 2003 |
| XIII (2003) | Richard Theiner | SVP | 18 November 2003 | 17 December 2003 (Note: Resigned.) |
| XIII (2003) | Veronika Stirner Brantsch | SVP | 18 December 2003 | 17 May 2006 |
| XIII (2003) | Riccardo Dello Sbarba | VGV | 18 May 2006 | 17 November 2008 |
| XIV (2008) | Dieter Steger | SVP | 18 November 2008 | 25 January 2011 (Note: Resigned.) |
| XIV (2008) | Julia Unterberger | SVP | 2 March 2011 | 17 May 2011 |
| XIV (2008) | Mauro Minniti | PdL | 18 May 2011 | 1 January 2013 (Note: Resigned.) |
| XIV (2008) | Maurizio Vezzali | PdL | 15 January 2013 | 21 November 2013 |
| XV (2013) | Martha Stocker | SVP | 22 November 2013 | 16 January 2014 (Note: Resigned.) |
| XV (2013) | Thomas Widmann | SVP | 17 January 2014 | 23 May 2016 |
| XV (2013) | Roberto Bizzo | PD | 24 May 2016 | 13 November 2018 |
| XVI (2018) | Thomas Widmann | SVP | 14 November 2018 | 25 January 2019 (Note: Resigned.) |
| XVI (2018) | Josef Noggler | SVP | 25 January 2019 | 13 May 2021 |
| XVI (2018) | Rita Mattei | LN | 14 May 2021 | 12 November 2023 |
| XVII (2023) | Josef Noggler | SVP | 13 November 2023 | Incumbent |
