= Helga Thaler Ausserhofer =

Italian politician

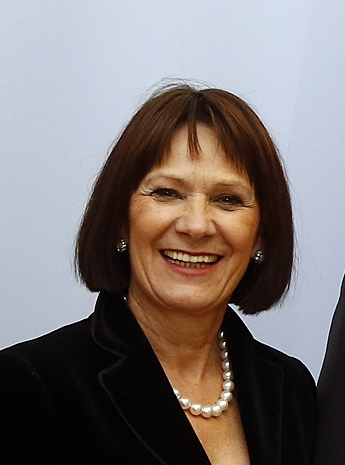

Helga Thaler Ausserhofer (born 13 April 1952) is an Italian politician who sat in that country's senate for the South Tyrolean People's Party.

== Career ==
Born in Campo Tures, Bolzano, on 13 April 1952, Thaler Ausserhofer holds a degree in economic and commercial sciences. She worked as a business consultant when first elected to the Chamber of Deputies in 1992, serving until 1994. She was subsequently elected to sit in the XII, XIII, XIV, XV and XVI legislatures of the Italian Senate, serving between 1994 and 2013.
