= Decorations of the Austrian Black Cross =

The Austrian Black Cross Decorations are the medals, pins and orders the Austrian Black Cross regularly awards to its members and benefactors.

== History ==
The Austrian Black Cross medals were instituted in 1960 to honor those that regularly served at the annual All Saint's Day Donation Campaign on local cemeteries. Over the years, the Black Cross added further decorations. Furthermore, a uniform ribbon (red-white-red white black edges) was introduced.

== Decorations ==
Nowadays, the Austrian Black Cross awards the following decorations:

- A Decoration for Services to the Austrian Black Cross in four classes (neck ribbon with star, neck ribbon, pin-on medal, medal on ribbon)
- A medal in five classes (pin-on medal, cross on ribbon, medal in gold, silver, bronze)
- A pin in two versions (gold, silver)
Pin (silver version)

Medal (pin-on medal)

Decoration for Services to the Black Cross (neck ribbon)
