= Hans Karl Peterlini =

Hans Karl Peterlini (born 12 March 1961) is an author, journalist, Austrian university professor and educational researcher originally from South Tyrol (Südtirol/Alto Adige), an autonomous, mostly German speaking province in Northern Italy.

Like over 2/3 of the people living in the province, Hans Karl is a native speaker of German, which has historically been the majority language spoken by the local population. His older brother is a politician Oskar Peterlini.

== Biography ==
Born in Bozen/Bolzano, Hans Karl grew up with his family in the South Tyrolean Unterland, just few miles south of Bozen. He attended the Liceo classico in Bozen where he obtained the "Maturità", the Italian high-school diploma.

Peterlini became a journalist in 1982.After first experiences at Dolomiten, the regional daily newspaper, he took a job with ff – Südtiroler Wochenmagazin, a weekly news magazine with broadly liberal views on politics and economics, becoming its editor in chief. In 1982, he was sacked under political pressure following a series of reports of possible political scandals. After that he joined with Hubertus Czernin and the Lentsch family to set up a rival news magazine, Südtirol Profil. After its financial failure, his former magazine called him back as editor-in-chief, resuming his role as editor in chief between 1998 and 2004. His journalistic career marked the opening and pluralisation of the South Tyrolean media world, which had long been characterised by an ethnically based monopoly.

Enduring themes in his writing included the balance of risks between violent confrontation and peaceful co-existence in recent South Tyrol history, coupled with related questions involving how people might grow beyond traditional cultural patterns and ethnic hostilities that had been a feature of the region since its involuntary incorporation into Italy during the second decade of the twentieth century. During the early years of the twenty-first century he published his first books on themes of South Tyrol terrorism, and his book Wir Kinder der Südtirol-Autonomie (2003 - "We, the Children of South Tyrol Devolution").

In 2004 Peterlini opted out of journalism and turned to education through studies and research at the University of Innsbruck and the Faculty of Education at the Free University of Bolzano (Bozen), first with a focus on psychoanalytical aspects, later on phenomenological approaches. His objective was to revisit the themes of his previous writing from a more academic perspective. His dissertation The Explosion of Power and Powerlessness ("Die Sprengung von Macht und Ohnmacht"), published under the title Freedom fighters on the Couch ("Freiheitskämpfer auf der Couch"), attempted to provide a psychoanalytic perspective on the terrorist attacks in South Tyrol between 1956 and 1967. The theme of his dissertation was "Homeland/Heimat" as a catch-all for political identity in South Tyrol, summarized in the English open-access article “Heimat-Homeland between life world and defence psychosis: Intercultural learning and unlearning in an ethnocentric culture: long-term study on the identity formation of junior Schützen (shooters)"

He received his habilitation (higher academic qualification) from Innsbruck for a dissertation entitled "Learning and Power: Paradigms of Education and Training in Schools, Culture and Politics" ("Lernen und Macht. Paradigmata der Bildung in Schule, Kultur, Politik") and he received his corresponding teaching certificate. For the 2014/2015 academic year he obtained the teaching chair in "General Education Sciences and Intercultural Education" at Klagenfurt's Alpen-Adria University. In 2020, he established the UNESCO Chair on Global Citizenship Education at the University of Klagenfurt and became its holder. In 2023 brought his research together in the open access book "Learning Diversity", which spans from ethnicised identity designs to global citizenship. His most recent focus is on the potential of transformative learning for a more just and equal world. In the book "The Epicenter: Democracy, Eco*Global Citizenship and Transformative Education", edited by Paul Carr, Gina Thésée, & Eloy Rivas-Sanchez (2023), Peterlini wrote the Chapter "Feeling the World", exploring potentialities and dilemmas for creating a global empathy. For the university course Global Citizenship Education (2019-2023, Peterlini and the course team (Jasmin Donlic, Heidi Grobbauer, Karin Liebhart, Werner Wintersteiner) were awarded the Global Education Award. With Jasmin Donlic he is editing the Yearbook Migration and Society.
