= Dieter Steger =

Italian politician

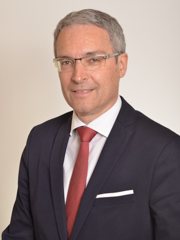
- Steger in 2018

Member of the Chamber of Deputies from Trentino-South Tyrol
- Incumbent
- Assumed office 2 November 2018

Member of the Landtag of South Tyrol
- In office 9 November 2013 - 2 November 2018
- In office 18 December 2008 – January 25, 2011

Personal details
- Born: Dieter Steger; June 24, 1964 (age 61) Bruneck, South Tyrol, Italy
- Party: South Tyrolean People's Party

Dieter Steger (born 24 June 1964) is an Italian politician who is the chairman of the South Tyrolean People's Party and a member of the Chamber of Deputies since 2018, representing the constituency of Trentino-South Tyrol.

== Career ==
Prior to his election, Steger was a member of the Landtag of South Tyrol from 2008 to 2011 and again from 2013 until 2018. He was selected to lead the party at SVP at the 2024 European Parliament election in Italy.

He worked for the Trade and Services Association in South Tyrol prior to his election.
