= 1948 Trentino-Alto Adige/Südtirol regional election =

The Trentino-Alto Adige/Südtirol regional election of 1948 took place on 28 November 1948. It was the first election ever. Proportional representation was used.

Under provisions of the autonomy laws, the Provincial Council of Trento and the Provincial Council of Bolzano were established as sections of the Regional Council.

The Christian Democracy and the South Tyrolean People's Party won the election.

== Results ==
=== Regional Council ===
Party	Votes	%	Seats
Christian Democracy	130,604	36.7	17
South Tyrolean People's Party	107,249	30.2	13
Trentino Tyrolean People's Party	33,137	9.3	4
Italian Socialist Party	22,512	6.3	3
Italian Communist Party	16,815	4.7	2
Italian Workers' Socialist Party	16,528	4.7	3
Anti-Autonomist National League	6,118	1.7	1
Union of Independents	5,674	1.6	1
Italian Social Movement	4,662	1.3	1
Tridentine Autonomy	4,065	1.1	–
Independent Autonomists	2,994	0.8	1
Italian Liberal Party	2,628	0.7	–
Italian Republican Party	1,772	0.5	–
Others	804	0.2	–
Total	355,562	100.0	46
Source: Trentino-Alto Adige/Südtirol Region

=== Trentino ===
Party	Votes	%	Seats
Christian Democracy	113,509	57.6	15
Trentino Tyrolean People's Party	33,137	16.8	4
Italian Socialist Party	14,587	7.4	2
Italian Workers' Socialist Party	11,637	5.9	2
Italian Communist Party	10,534	5.4	1
Anti-Autonomist National League	6,118	3.1	1
Independent Autonomists	2,994	1.5	1
Italian Liberal Party	2,628	1.3	–
Italian Republican Party	1,772	0.9	–
Total	196,916	100.0	26
Source: Trentino-Alto Adige/Südtirol Region

=== South Tyrol ===
Party	Votes	%	Seats
South Tyrolean People's Party	107,249	67.6	13
Christian Democracy	17,095	10.8	2
Italian Socialist Party	7,925	5.0	1
Italian Communist Party	6,281	4.0	1
Union of Independents	5,674	3.6	1
Italian Workers' Socialist Party	4,891	3.1	1
Italian Social Movement	4,662	2.9	1
Tridentine Autonomy	4,065	2.6	–
Others	804	0.5	–
Total	158,646	100.0	20
Source: Trentino-Alto Adige/Südtirol Region
