= Meinhard Durnwalder =

Italian politician (born 1976)

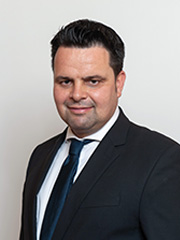
- Durnwalder in 2022

Member of the Senate of the Republic
- Incumbent
- Assumed office 23 March 2018
- Constituency: Trentino-Alto Adige/Südtirol – U06

Personal details
- Born: 12 December 1976 (age 49)
- Party: South Tyrolean People's Party
- Relatives: Luis Durnwalder (uncle)

Meinhard Durnwalder (born 12 December 1976) is an Italian politician serving as a member of the Senate since 2018. He is the nephew of Luis Durnwalder.
