= Hans Berger (politician) =

German trade unionist and politician (1938–2022)

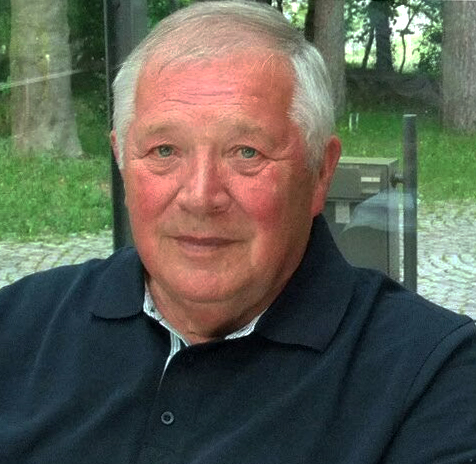
- Berger in 2018

Member of the Bundestag
- In office 20 December 1990 – 26 October 1998

Personal details
- Born: 28 February 1938 Alsdorf, Rhine Province, Prussia, Germany
- Died: 6 October 2022 (aged 84) Saarbrücken, Saarland, Germany
- Party: SPD
- Education: European Academy of Work
- Occupation: Trade unionist

Hans Berger (28 February 1938 – 6 October 2022) was a German trade unionist and politician of the Social Democratic Party (SPD). From 1990 to 1998, he served in the Bundestag and served as the chairman of the Union of Mining and Energy (IGBE). Most recently, he was a member of the IG Bergbau, Chemie, Energie (IGBCE).

== Biography ==
After his primary studies, Berger carried out an apprenticeship in mining from 1953 to 1956 and subsequently worked at the Grube Anna in Alsdorf. Early in his apprenticeship, he became involved in trade unions such as the IGBE and the IGBCE. In 1949, he joined the Socialist Youth of Germany – Falcons. In 1957, he was elected secretary and later chairman of the local IGBE group in Alsdorf. In 1961, he was elected to the works council of the Grube Anna.

From 1964 to 1966, Berger studied at the European Academy of Work in Frankfurt. In 1978, he was appointed district manager of the IGBE in Saarland. In 1984, he was elected to the executive committee, the second presidency in 1988, and presidency of the IGBE in 1990. During his tenure as president, he helped to orchestrate the merger between the IGBE, the Chemical, Paper and Ceramic Union, and the Leather Union.

=== Political career ===
Berger joined the SPD in 1957. He served on the District Council of Aachen from 1972 to 1978 and held numerous positions within the party organization. From 1990 to 1998, he served in the Bundestag, where he worked on the Economic Committee and the Social Policy Committee. He was elected via the state list in North Rhine-Westphalia.

=== Death ===
Hans Berger died in Saarbrücken on 6 October 2022, at the age of 84.

== Awards ==
- Commander's Cross of the Order of Merit of the Federal Republic of Germany
- Peter-Beier-Preis
- Honorary professor of the Technische Hochschule Georg Agricola
