= Julia Unterberger =

Italian politician (born 1962)

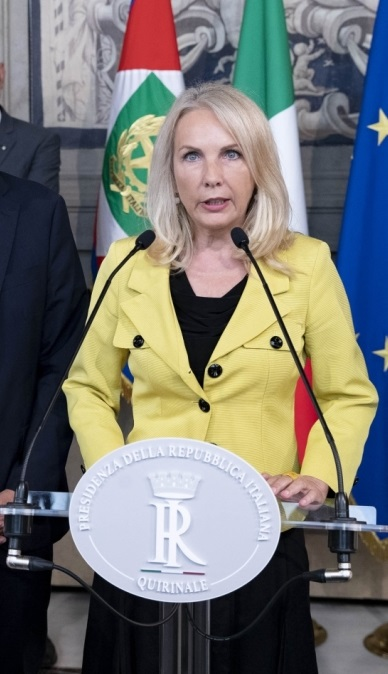

Member of the Senate of the Republic
- Incumbent
- Assumed office 23 March 2018
- Constituency: Merano

Personal details
- Born: 5 September 1962 (age 64) Merano, Italy
- Party: SVP
- Spouse: Karl Zeller
- Children: 2
- Education: University of Innsbruck
- Occupation: Politician

Juliane "Julia" Unterberger (born 5 September 1962) is an Italian lawyer and politician from South Tyrol.

== Biography ==
Unterberger attended the Beda-Weber-Gymnasium in Merano and then studied at the University of Innsbruck. In 1987, she completed her studies in economics with a diploma thesis on economic statistics in South Tyrol, in 1992 successfully completing the law studies offered by the Universities of Innsbruck and Padua with a diploma thesis on the implementation of EC law in Italy. Professionally, she works as a lawyer specializing in family law in South Tyrol. From 1999 to 2008, she was President of the State Advisory Board for Equal Opportunities.

In the provincial elections in 2003, Unterberger was able to win a seat in the Landtag and thus also in the regional council on the list of the South Tyrolean People's Party. She narrowly missed re-election in the 2008 provincial elections. After Christian Egartner had to resign from the Landtag according to a judgment of the court of cassation, Unterberger moved up for him and was sworn in again as a member of parliament on 21 July 2010. On 2 March 2011, she was elected President of the Landtag to succeed Dieter Steger. According to the intended rotation principle at mid-term of the legislative period, she was replaced in this office by Mauro Minniti on 18 May, but remained as vice-president. Unterberger used her work in the Presidium of the Landtag to implement a new interpretation of the rules of procedure that the opposition parties had unsuccessfully fought against and which will prevent future obstruction. Before the state elections in 2013, she decided not to run again. In the parliamentary elections in 2018 she was elected into the Italian Senate with 61.1% of the votes in the single constituency of Merano.

== Personal life ==
Unterberger lives in Merano, is married and has two children from her previous marriage to Karl Zeller.
