= Vanessa Cattoi =

Italian politician (born 1980)

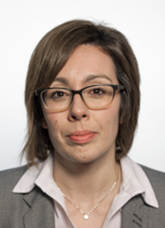
- Cattoi in 2018

Member of the Chamber of Deputies
- Incumbent
- Assumed office 23 March 2018
- Constituency: Trentino-Alto Adige/Südtirol – U05

Personal details
- Born: 12 July 1980 (age 46)
- Party: Lega

Vanessa Cattoi (born 12 July 1980) is an Italian politician serving as a member of the Chamber of Deputies since 2018. She has served as an assessor of Ala since 2024.

== Biography ==
A member of the Lega Nord, she ran for mayor of Ala in the 2010 local elections, receiving 12.68% of the vote. Although she did not advance to the runoff, she was elected to the city council.

In the 2015 local elections, she was also the mayoral candidate for the Northern League and Forza Italia (2013), but once again, her 18.49% of the vote was not enough to advance to the runoff; she did, however, manage to win a seat on the city council.

From 2010 to 2018, he served on the board of directors of the Fondazione Bruno Kessler as a representative of the minority groups represented in the Provincial Council.
