= Junge Generation =

Young Generation Junge Generation
- President: René Tumler
- Vice President: Mara Amort; Manuel Massl; Klaus Mutschlechner (Ladin deputy)
- Secretary General: Johannes Winkler
- Founded: 19 April 1970
- Headquarters: Brennerstraße 7A; I-39100 Bolzano
- Mother party: South Tyrolean People's Party
- European affiliation: Youth of the European People's Party; Democrat Youth Community of Europe
- German speaking alps affiliation: Junge Alpenregion
- Website: Official website

The Young Generation (German: Junge Generation, JG) is the youth organisation of the South Tyrolean People's Party (SVP), a political party representing the German-speaking and Ladin-speaking population of South Tyrol, in Italy.

The Young Generation has about 6,000 members and is therefore the largest political youth organisation in South Tyrol and is the community of all party members of the SVP at the age of 14 to 30. The JG has about 100 local groups spread over the whole territory. President of the organisation is René Tumler, who was elected from the congress together with his deputies in March 2014. The JG is the youth branch of the SVP and wants to be the spokesman of the young people within the party.

The logo was restyled in spring 2010. The colours are black, white and red. The last two are the colours of the Tyrolean flag and represents the link of the youth organisation with the territory.

The Young Generation was founded as Youth of the SVP (SVP-Jugend) on 19 April 1970 during the first congress at the Waltherhaus in Bolzano. The first elected president was Hans Benedikter. Hans Bauer and Klaus Dubis were his deputies, Ferdinand Mussner was the Ladin deputy and Klaus Gruber was elected as secretary general. The creation of local groups began since 1966/67. Erich Spitaler was appointed in 1967 as president of the youth branch of the SVP and he was charged to develop the youth organisation. The first statute was adopted by the council of the mother party in 1968. The SVP-Jugend had a fast grow and in 1969 105 local groups and 244 local youth speaker were count.

The Young Generation is member of different international umbrella organisations, as the Youth of the European Peoples Party (YEPP), the Democrat Youth Community of Europe (DEMYC) and the Young Alps Region (Junge Alpenregion). The Young Generation is actively proposing resolutions within these international organisations.
