= Renate Gebhard =

Italian politician from South Tyrol

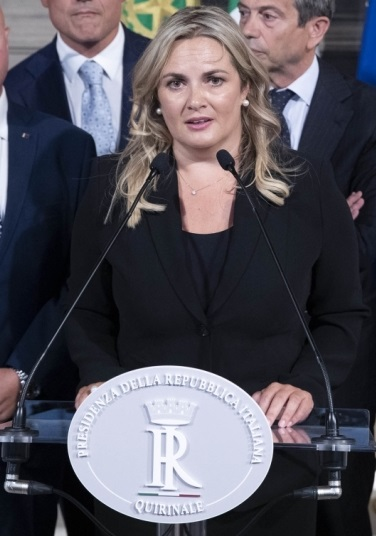

Member of the Chamber of Deputies
- Incumbent
- Assumed office 2013
- Constituency: Trentino-Alto Adige

Personal details
- Born: Renate Gebhard; 2 May 1977 (age 49) Bolzano, Italy
- Party: South Tyrolean People's Party
- Education: University of Innsbruck, University of Padua
- Occupation: Lawyer, Politician

Renate Gebhard (born 2 May 1977) is an Italian jurist and politician of South Tyrolean People's Party (SVP). She is a current member of the Italian Chamber of Deputies.

== Early life and education ==
She attended high school in Bolzano and later studied law at the University of Innsbruck and Padua. She graduated in 2002 and by 2006 she worked as a lawyer in Bolzano.

== Political career ==
In 2005 she was elected into the municipal council of Klausen and in 2013 assumed as a member of the Italian Parliament representing Trentino-Alto Adige for the SVP.

=== Political positions ===
Since 2014 she is the spokesperson for the SVP women and as such draws attention to issues such as Equal Pay Day and gender equality. During the pandemic of Covid she positioned herself in favor of an organized education and the reopening of schools.
