= List of political parties in Trentino-Alto Adige/Südtirol =

Several political parties operate in Trentino-Alto Adige/Südtirol, and historically they have been even more than today. The Region is composed of two autonomous provinces, having two different system of parties: Trentino and South Tyrol.

No one party has ever had the chance of gaining power alone (even though Lega Nord Trentino and the South Tyrolean People's Party are by far the largest parties in their Province) and thus parties must work with each other to form coalition governments.

== Trentino ==
This is a list of political parties in Trentino, including both active parties and historical regional parties.

== Parties ==
=== Current parties ===
- Trentino League (Lega Trentino)
- Democratic Party (Partito Democratico)
  - Trentino Future (Futura Trentino)
  - Italian Socialist Party (Partito Socialista Italiano)
- More Europe (Più Europa)
- Brothers of Italy (Fratelli d'Italia)
- Base Camp (Campobase)
- Trentino Tyrolean Autonomist Party (Partito Autonomista Trentino Tirolese)
  - Trentino Project (Progetto Trentino)
  - Popular Autonomists (Autonomisti Popolari)
- The Civic List (La Civica)
- Autonomy House (Casa Autonomia)
- Greens and Left Alliance (Alleanza Verdi e Sinistra)
  - Green Europe (Europa Verde)
  - Italian Left (Sinistra Italiana)
- Wave (Onda)
- Sovereign Popular Democracy (Democrazia Sovrana Popolare)
  - Communist Party (Partito Comunista)
- Forward Italy (Forza Italia)
- Five Star Movement (Movimento Cinque Stelle)
- Ladin Autonomist Union (Unione Autonomista Ladina)
- Italy Alive (Italia Viva)
- Action (Azione)
- Popular Alternative (Alternativa Popolare)
- Fassa Association (Associazione Fassa)
- Union of the Centre (Unione di Centro)
- Alternative (Alternative)
- People's Union (Unione Popolare)
  - Communist Refoundation Party (Partito della Rifondazione Comunista)

=== Former regional parties ===
- Anti-Autonomistic National League (Lega Nazionale Anti-Autonomistica)
- Alliance of Independents (Alleanza Indipendenti)
- Independent Autonomists (Autonomisti Indipendenti)
- Craftsman-Farmer Alliance (Alleanza Contadina Artigiana)
- New Left (Nuova Sinistra–Neue Linke)
- Union of Independents for Trentino (Unione Indipendenti per il Trentino)
- Trentino Tyrolean People's Party (Partito Popolare Trentino Tirolese)
- Trentino Tyrolean Autonomist Union (Unione Autonomista Trentino Tirolese)
- Integral Autonomy (Autonomia Integrale)
- Trentino Autonomy League (Lega Autonomia Trentino)
- Alliance for Trentino (Alleanza per il Trentino)
- Popular Autonomy (Autonomia Popolare)
- Trentino Autonomists (Autonomisti Trentini)
- Trentino Tomorrow (Trentino Domani)
- Daisy Civic List (Civica Margherita)
- Loyal to Trentino (Leali al Trentino)
- United Valleys (Valli Unite)
- Administer Trentino (Amministrare il Trentino)
- Act for Trentino (Agire per il Trentino)
- Trentino Civic List (Civica Trentina)
- Union for Trentino (Unione per il Trentino)

== See also ==
- List of political parties in Italy

== South Tyrol ==
=== Current parties ===
- South Tyrolean People's Party (Südtiroler Volkspartei)
- Team K (Team K)
- South Tyrolean Freedom (Süd-Tirol Freiheit)
- Greens (Verdi–Grüne–Vërc)
- Brothers of Italy (Fratelli d'Italia)
- JWA List (JWA Liste)
- The Freedomites (Die Freiheitlichen)
- Democratic Party (Partito Democratico)
- For South Tyrol (Für Südtirol)
- Lega Alto Adige Südtirol (Lega Alto Adige–Südtirol)
  - United for Alto Adige (Uniti per l'Alto Adige)
- The Civic List (La Civica)
  - Italy Alive (Italia Viva)
  - Action (Azione)
- Life (Vita)
- Free Group (Freie Fraktion)
- Five Star Movement (Movimento Cinque Stelle)
- Gentian (Enzian)
- Forward Alto Adige (Forza Alto Adige)

=== Former regional parties ===
- Union of Independents (Unione Indipendenti)
- Tridentine Autonomy (Autonomia Tridentina)
- Italian Union (Unione Italiana)
- Tyrolean Homeland Party (Tiroler Heimatpartei)
- Social Progressive Party of South Tyrol (Soziale Fortschrittspartei Südtirols)
- Social Democratic Party of South Tyrol (Sozialdemokratische Partei Südtirols)
- Party of Independents (Partei der Unabhängigen)
- New Left (Nuova Sinistra–Neue Linke)
- South Tyrolean Homeland Federation (Südtiroler Heimatbund)
- Freedom Party of South Tyrol (Freiheitliche Partei Südtirols)
- Democratic Party of South Tyrol (Demokratische Partei Südtirols)
- Democratic Union of Alto Adige (Unione Democratica del Alto Adige)
- Citizens' Movement (Bürgerbewegung)
- Ladins Dolomites (Ladins Dolomites)
- UnItaly (Unitalia)
- Alto Adige in the Heart (Alto Adige nel Cuore)
- Citizens' Union for South Tyrol (BürgerUnion für Südtirol)
- We South Tyroleans (Wir Südtiroler)

== See also ==
- List of political parties in Italy
