= List of political parties in Trentino =

This is a list of political parties in Trentino, including both active parties and historical regional parties.

== Parties ==
=== Current parties ===
- Trentino League (Lega Trentino)
- Democratic Party (Partito Democratico)
  - Trentino Future (Futura Trentino)
  - Italian Socialist Party (Partito Socialista Italiano)
- More Europe (Più Europa)
- Brothers of Italy (Fratelli d'Italia)
- Base Camp (Campobase)
- Trentino Tyrolean Autonomist Party (Partito Autonomista Trentino Tirolese)
  - Trentino Project (Progetto Trentino)
  - Popular Autonomists (Autonomisti Popolari)
- The Civic List (La Civica)
- Autonomy House (Casa Autonomia)
- Greens and Left Alliance (Alleanza Verdi e Sinistra)
  - Green Europe (Europa Verde)
  - Italian Left (Sinistra Italiana)
- Wave (Onda)
- Sovereign Popular Democracy (Democrazia Sovrana Popolare)
  - Communist Party (Partito Comunista)
- Forward Italy (Forza Italia)
- Five Star Movement (Movimento Cinque Stelle)
- Ladin Autonomist Union (Unione Autonomista Ladina)
- Italy Alive (Italia Viva)
- Action (Azione)
- Popular Alternative (Alternativa Popolare)
- Fassa Association (Associazione Fassa)
- Union of the Centre (Unione di Centro)
- Alternative (Alternative)
- People's Union (Unione Popolare)
  - Communist Refoundation Party (Partito della Rifondazione Comunista)

=== Former regional parties ===
- Anti-Autonomistic National League (Lega Nazionale Anti-Autonomistica)
- Alliance of Independents (Alleanza Indipendenti)
- Independent Autonomists (Autonomisti Indipendenti)
- Craftsman-Farmer Alliance (Alleanza Contadina Artigiana)
- New Left (Nuova Sinistra–Neue Linke)
- Union of Independents for Trentino (Unione Indipendenti per il Trentino)
- Trentino Tyrolean People's Party (Partito Popolare Trentino Tirolese)
- Trentino Tyrolean Autonomist Union (Unione Autonomista Trentino Tirolese)
- Integral Autonomy (Autonomia Integrale)
- Trentino Autonomy League (Lega Autonomia Trentino)
- Alliance for Trentino (Alleanza per il Trentino)
- Popular Autonomy (Autonomia Popolare)
- Trentino Autonomists (Autonomisti Trentini)
- Trentino Tomorrow (Trentino Domani)
- Daisy Civic List (Civica Margherita)
- Loyal to Trentino (Leali al Trentino)
- United Valleys (Valli Unite)
- Administer Trentino (Amministrare il Trentino)
- Act for Trentino (Agire per il Trentino)
- Trentino Civic List (Civica Trentina)
- Union for Trentino (Unione per il Trentino)

== See also ==
- List of political parties in Italy
