= 2018 Trentino-Alto Adige/Südtirol provincial elections =

- 21 October 2018
- Provincial election in Trentino
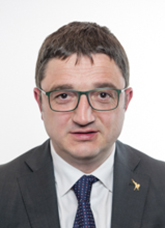

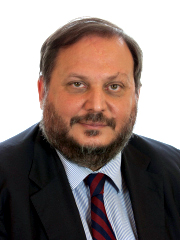

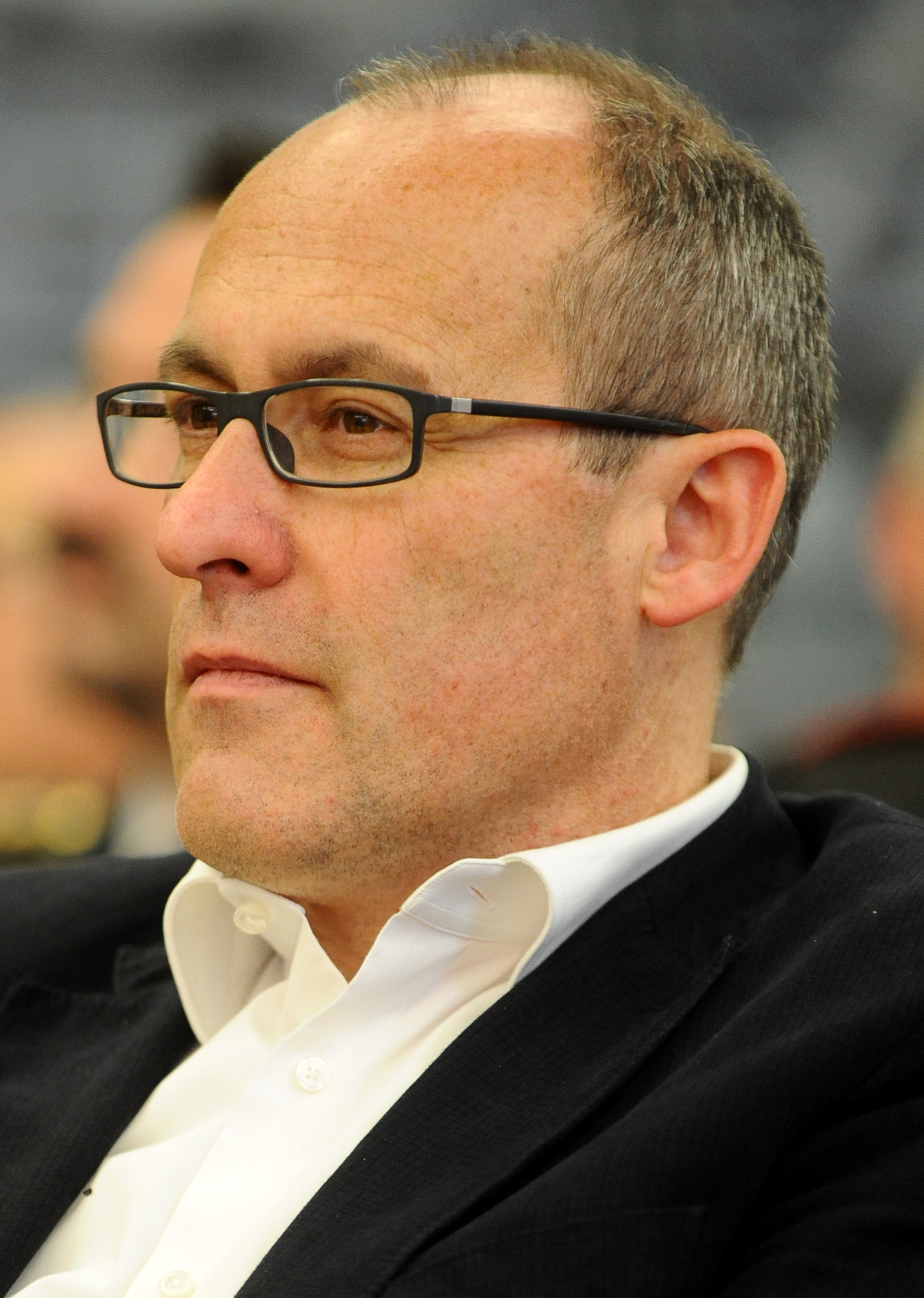

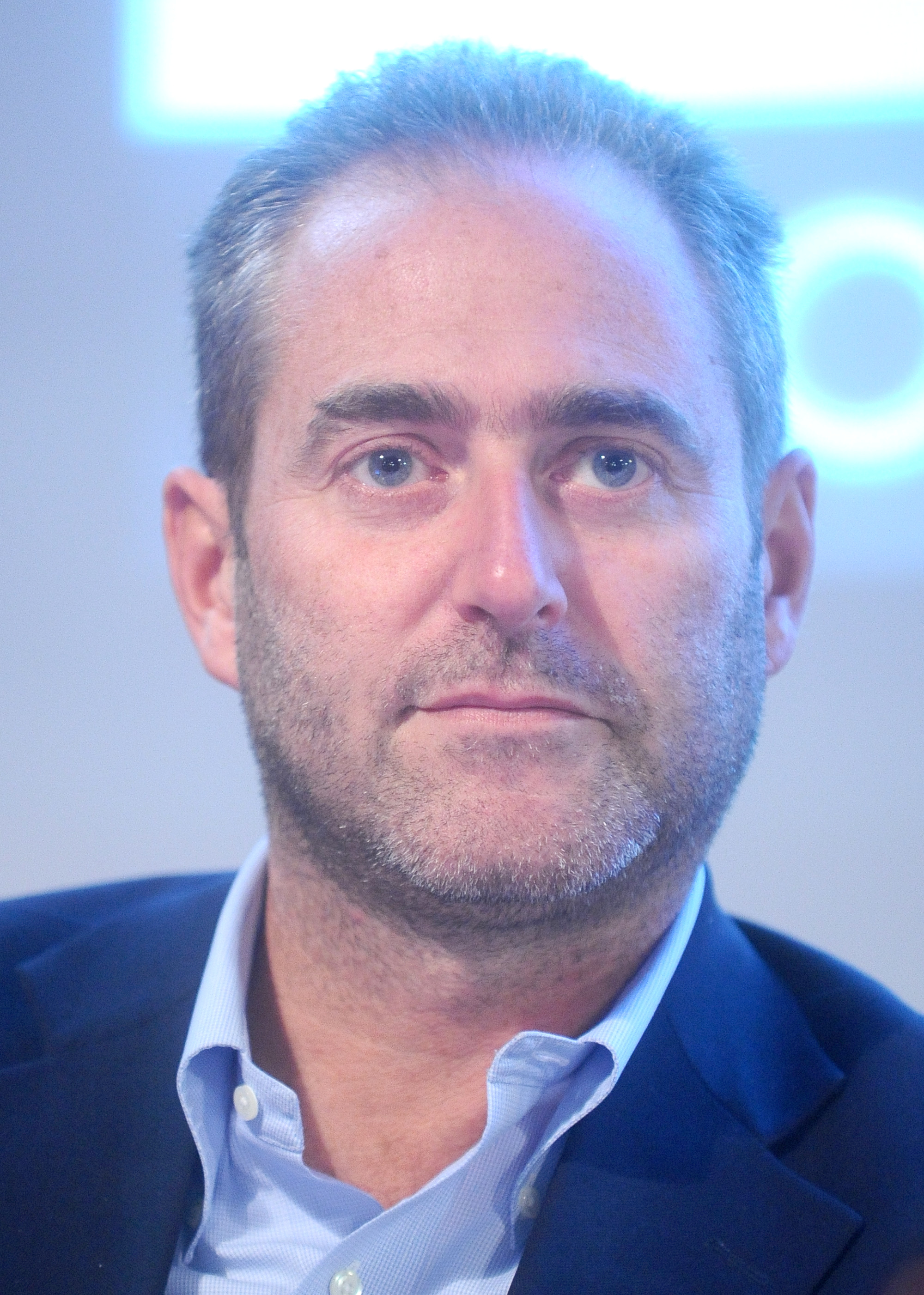
	First party	Second party
Candidate	Maurizio Fugatti	Giorgio Tonini
Party	Lega	Democratic Party
Alliance	Centre-right	Centre-left
Seats won	21	8
Seat change	▲11	▼7
Popular vote	124,590	67,712
Percentage	46.74%	25.40%
Swing	▲14.26%	▼10.00%
	Third party	Fourth party
Candidate	Ugo Rossi	Filippo Degasperi
Party	PATT	Five Star Movement
Seats won	4	2
Seat change	▼4	0
Popular vote	33,121	18,922
Percentage	12.42%	7.10%
Swing	▼5.13%	▲1.38
President before election
Ugo Rossi
PATT
Elected President
Maurizio Fugatti
Lega
- Provincial election in South Tyrol
- All 35 seats to the Landtag of South Tyrol
Party	Leader	Vote %	Seats	+/–
SVP	Arno Kompatscher	41.9	15	−2
TK	Paul Köllensperger	15.2	6	New
Lega	Massimo Bessone	11.1	4	+4
Greens	Brigitte Foppa	6.8	3	0
dF	Mair Ulli	6.2	2	−4
STF	Sven Knoll	6.0	2	−1
PD	Christian Tommasini	3.8	1	−1
M5S	Diego Nicolini	2.4	1	0
AAC – FdI	Alessandro Urzì	1.7	1	0
This lists parties that won seats. See the complete results below.
Governor before	Elected Governor
Arno Kompatscher; SVP	Arno Kompatscher; SVP

The Trentino-Alto Adige/Südtirol provincial elections of 2018 took place on 21 October 2018.

== Trentino ==
In Trentino, the president is elected directly by the people; the candidate who gains the most votes is elected president.

=== Parties and candidates ===
Political party or alliance	Constituent lists	Previous result		Candidate
Political party or alliance	Constituent lists	Votes (%)	Seats	Candidate
Centre-left coalition	Democratic Party (PD)	22.1	9	Giorgio Tonini
Centre-left coalition	Union for Trentino (UpT)	13.3	5	Giorgio Tonini
Centre-left coalition	Futura 2018 (incl. FdV)	—N/a	—N/a	Giorgio Tonini
Centre-right coalition	Trentino Project (PT)	9.0	4	Maurizio Fugatti
Centre-right coalition	Lega Trentino (LT)	6.2	1	Maurizio Fugatti
Centre-right coalition	Forza Italia (FI)	4.4	–	Maurizio Fugatti
Centre-right coalition	Trentino Civic List (CT)	3.7	1	Maurizio Fugatti
Centre-right coalition	Brothers of Italy (FdI)	1.6	–	Maurizio Fugatti
Centre-right coalition	Fassa Association (Fassa)	0.8	–	Maurizio Fugatti
Centre-right coalition	Popular Autonomists (AP)	—N/a	—N/a	Maurizio Fugatti
Centre-right coalition	Act for Trentino	—N/a	—N/a	Maurizio Fugatti
Centre-right coalition	Union of the Centre – People's Centre (UDC–CP)	—N/a	—N/a	Maurizio Fugatti
Trentino Tyrolean Autonomist Party (PATT)		17.6	7	Ugo Rossi
Five Star Movement (M5S)		5.9	1	Filippo Degasperi
Left wing coalition	Free and Equal (LeU) (incl. Art.1 and SI)	1.8	–	Antonella Valer
Left wing coalition	The Other Trentino on the Left (incl. PRC and PaP)	1.2	–	Antonella Valer

=== Results ===
2018 Trentino provincial election results
Candidates	Votes	%	Seats	Parties	Votes	%	Seats	+/−
Maurizio Fugatti	124,590	46.74	1					
Maurizio Fugatti	124,590	46.74	1	Lega Trentino	69,116	27.09	13	+12
Maurizio Fugatti	124,590	46.74	1	Trentino Civic List	11,777	4.62	2	+1
Maurizio Fugatti	124,590	46.74	1	Trentino Project	8,248	3.23	1	-3
Maurizio Fugatti	124,590	46.74	1	Popular Autonomists	7,621	2.99	1	New
Maurizio Fugatti	124,590	46.74	1	Forza Italia	7,204	2.82	1	+1
Maurizio Fugatti	124,590	46.74	1	Act for Trentino	5,458	2.14	1	New
Maurizio Fugatti	124,590	46.74	1	UDC – People's Centre	5,306	2.08	–	–
Maurizio Fugatti	124,590	46.74	1	Brothers of Italy	3,686	1.44	–	±0
Maurizio Fugatti	124,590	46.74	1	Fassa Association	2,490	0.98	1	+1
Maurizio Fugatti	124,590	46.74	1	Total	120,906	47.39	20	–
Giorgio Tonini	67,712	25.40	1					
Giorgio Tonini	67,712	25.40	1	Democratic Party	35,530	13.93	4	-5
Giorgio Tonini	67,712	25.40	1	Futura 2018	17,670	6.93	2	New
Giorgio Tonini	67,712	25.40	1	Union for Trentino	10,150	3.98	1	-4
Giorgio Tonini	67,712	25.40	1	Total	63,350	24.83	7	–
Ugo Rossi	33,121	12.42	1	PATT	32,109	12.59	3	-4
Filippo Degasperi	18,922	7.10	1	Five Star Movement	18,437	7.23	1	±0
Antonella Valer	7,099	2.66	–					
Antonella Valer	7,099	2.66	–	Free and Equal	3,560	1.40	–	New
Antonella Valer	7,099	2.66	–	The Other Trentino on the Left	2,101	0.82	–	New
Antonella Valer	7,099	2.66	–	Total	5,661	2.22	–	–
Mauro Ottobre	5,237	1.96	–	Dynamic Autonomy	5,117	2.01	–	New
Roberto de Laurentis	4,015	1.51	–	TRE	3,826	1.50	–	New
Paolo Primon	2,384	0.89	–	Free People	2,285	0.90	–	New
Ferruccio Chenetti	1,904	0.71	–	Movement Ladin Fassa	1,890	0.74	–	New
Filippo Castaldini	1,247	0.47	–	CasaPound	1,215	0.48	–	–
Federico Monegaglia	350	0.13	–	Reconquer Italy	341	0.13	–	New
Total candidates	266,581	100	4	Total parties	255,137	100	31	±0
Source: Autonomous Province of Trento

Popular vote (party)
LT	27.1%
PD	13.9%
PATT	13.0%
M5S	7.2%
Futura	6.9%
CT	4.6%
UpT	4.0%
PT	3.2%
AP	3.0%
FI	2.8%
Agire	2.1%
UDC–CP	2.1%
AD	2.0%
TRE	1.5%
FdI	1.4%
LeU	1.4%
Others	5.9%

Popular vote (president)
Fugatti	46.7%
Tonini	25.4%
Rossi	12.4%
Degasperi	7.1%
Valer	2.7%
Ottobre	1.9%
De Laurentis	1.5%
Others	2.2%

=== Analysis ===
Similar to the election in Molise and the election in Friuli-Venezia Giulia, the M5S lost c. 15% of votes compared to the general election. On March 4, they reached almost 25%, but now just over 7%. By contrast, the centre-right coalition gained more than 10% compared to March 4.

== South Tyrol ==
In South Tyrol, all 35 members of the Provincial council (Landtag) are up for re-election. The council elects a government headed by a president (Landeshauptmann).

In the 2013 election, the South Tyrolean People's Party (SVP) lost its absolute majority for the first time since 1948.

=== Results ===
Parties	Votes	%	Seats	+/−
South Tyrolean People's Party	119,109	41.9	15	−2
Team Köllensperger	43,315	15.2	6	+6
Lega Alto Adige Südtirol	31,515	11.1	4	+4
Greens	19,392	6.8	3	±0
Die Freiheitlichen	17,620	6.2	2	−4
South Tyrolean Freedom	16,927	6.0	2	−1
Democratic Party	10,808	3.8	1	−1
Five Star Movement	6,670	2.4	1	±0
Alto Adige in the Heart – Brothers of Italy	4,882	1.7	1	±0
Citizens' Union	3,665	1.3	0	−1
We South Tyrol	3,428	1.2	0	±0
Forza Alto Adige	2,826	1.0	0	±0
CasaPound	2,451	0.9	0	±0
United Left	1,753	0.6	0	±0
Total	284,361	100.0	35	±0
Source: Province of Bolzano – Results

Popular vote
SVP	41.9%
TK	15.2%
LNAAST	11.4%
Grüne	6.8%
dF	6.2%
STF	6.0%
PD	3.8%
M5S	2.4%
AAC–FdI	1.7%
BUfS	1.3%
NOI	1.2%
FAA	1.0%
CPI	0.9%
SU	0.6%
