= Civic Alliance =

Civic Alliance may refer to:

- Civic Alliance Foundation, an NGO in Romania
- Civic Alliance (Bosnia and Herzegovina), a political party
- Civic Alliance of Serbia, a political party in Serbia
- Civic Democratic Alliance, a political party in the Czech Republic
- Civic Liberal Alliance, a political party in Croatia
- Centre Civic Alliance, a political coalition in Poland
- Hungarian Civic Alliance (disambiguation), multiple political parties
- Civil Alliance, a political party in Jordan

== See also ==
- Citizens' Alliance (disambiguation)
