= List of governors of South Tyrol =

This is the list of governors of South Tyrol since 1948.

The German title of the governor is Landeshauptmann, hence "governor".

Governors of South Tyrol
Governor	Portrait	Party	Term		Coalition	Legislature	Election
Karl Erckert (1894–1955)		SVP	20 December 1948	19 December 1952	SVP • DC • PSDI • UI (Note: Union of Independents.)	I Legislature	1948
Karl Erckert (1894–1955)		SVP	20 December 1952	15 December 1955 (Note: Died in office.)	SVP • DC	II Legislature	1952
Alois Pupp (1900–1969)		SVP	7 January 1956	14 December 1956	SVP • DC	II Legislature	1952
Alois Pupp (1900–1969)		SVP	15 December 1956	30 December 1960	SVP • DC	III Legislature	1956
Silvius Magnago (1914–2010)		SVP	31 December 1960	3 February 1965	SVP • DC	IV Legislature	1960
Silvius Magnago (1914–2010)		SVP	4 February 1965	16 February 1969	SVP • DC	V Legislature	1964
Silvius Magnago (1914–2010)		SVP	17 February 1969	14 May 1970	SVP • DC	VI Legislature	1968
Silvius Magnago (1914–2010)		SVP	15 May 1970	14 March 1974	SVP • DC • PSI	VI Legislature	1968
Silvius Magnago (1914–2010)		SVP	15 March 1974	10 April 1979	SVP • DC • PSI	VII Legislature	1973
Silvius Magnago (1914–2010)		SVP	11 April 1979	26 April 1984	SVP • DC • PSDI	VIII Legislature	1978
Silvius Magnago (1914–2010)		SVP	27 April 1984	16 March 1989	SVP • DC • PSI	IX Legislature	1983
Luis Durnwalder (b. 1941)		SVP	17 March 1989	10 February 1994	SVP • DC • PSI	X Legislature	1988
Luis Durnwalder (b. 1941)		SVP	11 February 1994	3 February 1999	SVP • PPI • PDS	XI Legislature	1993
Luis Durnwalder (b. 1941)		SVP	4 February 1999	17 December 2003	SVP • DS • PPI • UDAA	XII Legislature	1998
Luis Durnwalder (b. 1941)		SVP	18 December 2003	17 December 2008	SVP • DS • UDAA	XIII Legislature	2003
Luis Durnwalder (b. 1941)		SVP	18 December 2008	8 January 2014	SVP • PD	XIV Legislature	2008
Arno Kompatscher (b. 1971)		SVP	9 January 2014	16 January 2019	SVP • PD	XV Legislature	2013
Arno Kompatscher (b. 1971)		SVP	17 January 2019	17 January 2024	SVP • LAAST	XVI Legislature	2018
Arno Kompatscher (b. 1971)		SVP	18 January 2024	Incumbent	SVP • FdI • DF • LAAST (Note: In January LAAST's provincial minister Christian Bianchi switched to FI.) • LC (Note: External support.)	XVII Legislature	2023

Source: Landtag of South Tyrol
