= Team Autonomies =

Political party in Italy

Team Autonomies (Team Autonomie, Team A) was a liberal political party in South Tyrol, Italy.

The party's leader is Elena Artioli, a former member of the South Tyrolean People's Party (SVP) and provincial leader of Lega Nord Alto Adige – Südtirol (LNST) during 2013–2014. Once a sister party of LNST, Team A became an associate party of the Democratic Party (PD) in 2014.

== History ==
In the run-up to the 2008 provincial election LNST was joined by Elena Artioli, who had left the SVP after the party chose to restrict its membership to German- and Ladin-speakers. In the election LNST won 2.1% of the vote and Artioli was elected to the Provincial Council.

In January 2013 Artioli, who had become the party's rising star and the darling of Lega Nord's federal leadership, was elected national secretary of LNST and in May she announced that the party would run in the 2013 provincial election as part of the Team Autonomies/Team Artioli (Team A), a larger autonomist and inter-ethnic electoral list inspired by the Austrian party Team Stronach. Later, in September, Team A was integrated into the "Forza Alto Adige–Lega Nord–Team Autonomies" list, along with The People of Freedom. In the election the list took 2.5% of the vote and Artioli was the only candidate elected.

In January 2014, at the very beginning of the Council term, Artioli voted in favour of Arno Kompatscher (SVP), the new provincial governor, in a vote of confidence and, consequently, left Lega Nord. A few months later Artioli, who had come to be a supporter of Prime Minister Matteo Renzi, joined the PD and became the provincial coordinator of Liberal PD, the party's liberal faction led by Enzo Bianco. As a result, Team A became an associate party of the PD.

In 2018, Artioli finally left politics.

== Leadership ==
- President: Elena Artioli (2013–2018)
