= The Civic List =

The Civic List may refer to:

- The Civic List (Trentino)
- The Civic List (South Tyrol)

== See also ==
- Civic List (disambiguation)
