= Integral Autonomy =

Integral Autonomy may refer to:

- Integral Autonomy (1980s), regionalist Italian political party (Autonomia Integrale, 1982–1988)
- Integral Autonomy (1990s), regionalist Italian political party (Autonomia Integrale–FAR, 1996–2000)
