= Donato Seppi =

Italian politician

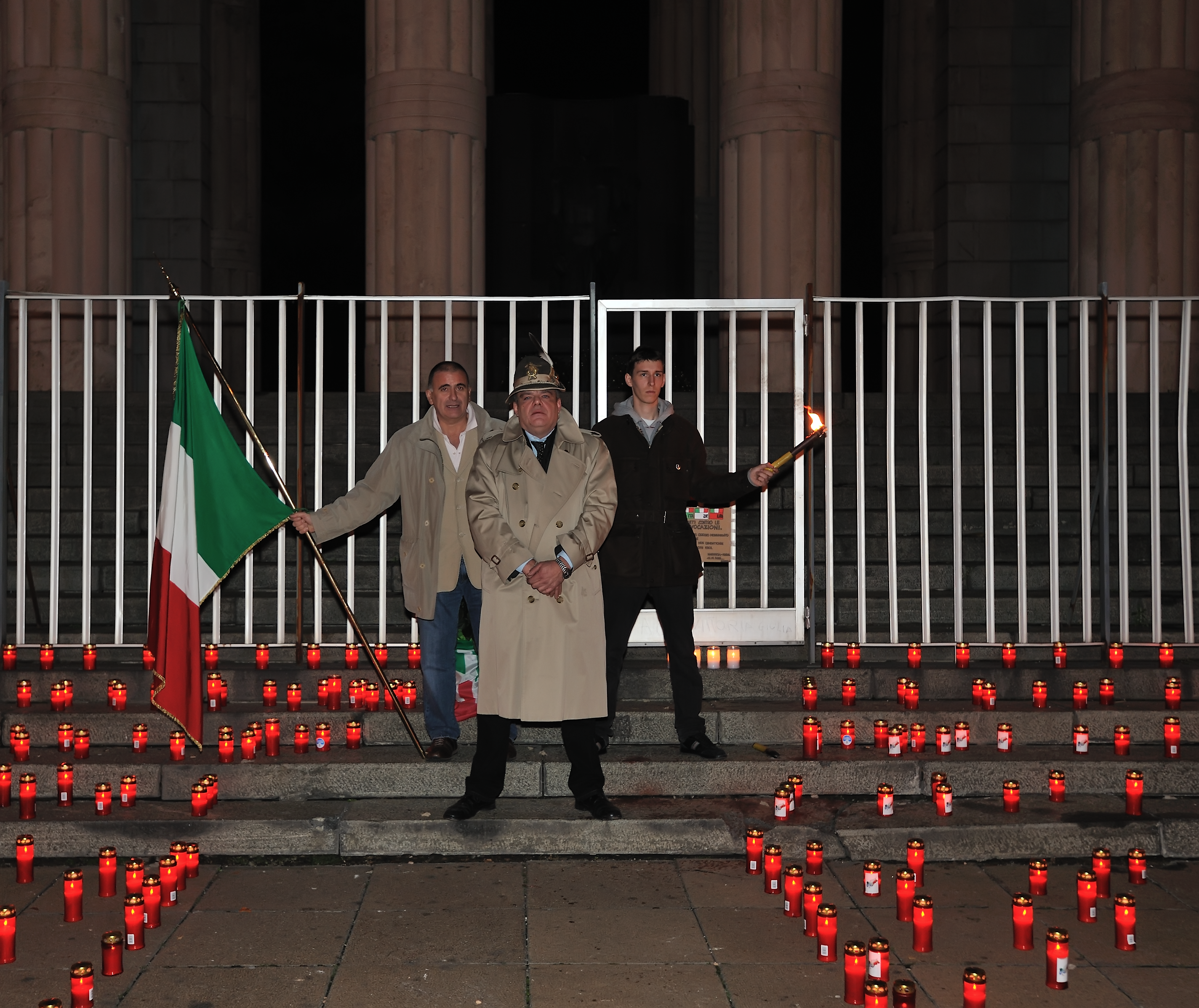
Donato Seppi (in the center) in front of the Bolzano Victory Monument

Donato Seppi (born in Bolzano in 1953) is an Italian politician, who has founded the local party Unitalia.

== Life ==
Donato Seppi was the owner of a small company engaged in the construction industry, and a former Alpini officer. He was elected in 1995 for the National Alliance in the Bolzano city council.
In 1996, Seppi founded with several like-minded persons the party Unitalia, whose current chairman he is. In 1998 he got elected into the Landtag of South Tyrol and became thereby also a member of the regional council of Trentino-Alto Adige/Südtirol.
Since January 2008 the party was the provincial section of The Right in South Tyrol, but left that party as soon as in November, when Seppi decided to join the Movement for Italy (Movimento per l'Italia/MpI), a split from "The Right" led by Daniela Santanchè and since then Unitalia became the provincial section of the MpI.
In the 2008 provincial election the party won 1.9% of the votes and Seppi was re-elected to the Landtag. However, in the 2013 provincial election Seppi and his party failed to gain a seat with only 1.7% of the votes.
