= List of political parties in South Tyrol =

This is a list of political parties in South Tyrol, including both active parties and historical regional parties.

== Parties ==
=== Current parties ===
- South Tyrolean People's Party (Südtiroler Volkspartei)
- Team K (Team K)
- South Tyrolean Freedom (Süd-Tirol Freiheit)
- Greens (Verdi–Grüne–Vërc)
- Brothers of Italy (Fratelli d'Italia)
- JWA List (JWA Liste)
- The Freedomites (Die Freiheitlichen)
- Democratic Party (Partito Democratico)
- For South Tyrol (Für Südtirol)
- Lega Alto Adige Südtirol (Lega Alto Adige–Südtirol)
  - United for Alto Adige (Uniti per l'Alto Adige)
- The Civic List (La Civica)
  - Italy Alive (Italia Viva)
  - Action (Azione)
- Life (Vita)
- Free Group (Freie Fraktion)
- Five Star Movement (Movimento Cinque Stelle)
- Gentian (Enzian)
- Forward Alto Adige (Forza Alto Adige)

=== Former regional parties ===
- Union of Independents (Unione Indipendenti)
- Tridentine Autonomy (Autonomia Tridentina)
- Italian Union (Unione Italiana)
- Tyrolean Homeland Party (Tiroler Heimatpartei)
- Social Progressive Party of South Tyrol (Soziale Fortschrittspartei Südtirols)
- Social Democratic Party of South Tyrol (Sozialdemokratische Partei Südtirols)
- Party of Independents (Partei der Unabhängigen)
- New Left (Nuova Sinistra–Neue Linke)
- South Tyrolean Homeland Federation (Südtiroler Heimatbund)
- Freedom Party of South Tyrol (Freiheitliche Partei Südtirols)
- Democratic Party of South Tyrol (Demokratische Partei Südtirols)
- Democratic Union of Alto Adige (Unione Democratica del Alto Adige)
- Citizens' Movement (Bürgerbewegung)
- Ladins Dolomites (Ladins Dolomites)
- UnItaly (Unitalia)
- Alto Adige in the Heart (Alto Adige nel Cuore)
- Citizens' Union for South Tyrol (BürgerUnion für Südtirol)
- We South Tyroleans (Wir Südtiroler)

== See also ==
- List of political parties in Italy
