= UCM =

UCM may refer to:

== Educational institutions ==
- University College Isle of Man, primary centre for tertiary, vocational education and higher education on the Isle of Man
- University College Maastricht, a liberal arts and sciences college in Maastricht, the Netherlands and part of Maastricht University
- University of California, Merced, a public university in Merced, California, US
- University of Central Missouri, a public institution in Warrensburg, Missouri, US
- Complutense University of Madrid, a university in Madrid, Spain
- Catholic University of Madagascar, a university in Antananarivo, Madagascar
- Catholic University of Mozambique, a university with campuses throughout central and northern Mozambique
- Catholic University of the Maule (Universidad Católica del Maule), a university in Chile
- Kazimierz Wielki University in Bydgoszcz (Universitas Casimiri Magni), a university in Bydgoszcz, Poland

== Science and technology ==
- Uniform circular motion, the motion of a body traversing a circular path at constant speed
- Unresolved complex mixture, a feature observed in gas chromatographic data
- Universal Content Management, software forming part of Oracle Fusion Middleware
- Upper-convected Maxwell model, a rheological model for polymer liquids

== Other uses ==
- Hungarian Civic Alliance (disambiguation) (Uniunea Civică Maghiară), several political parties
