= Alto Adige in the Heart =

Political party in Italy

Alto Adige in the Heart L'Alto Adige nel Cuore
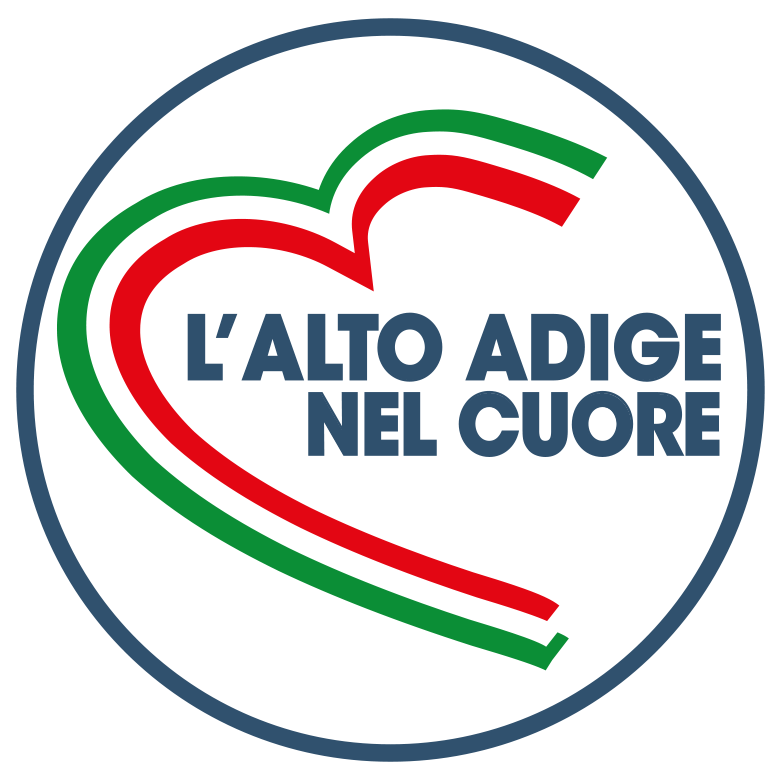
- President: Alessandro Urzì
- Founded: January 2013
- Dissolved: 6 July 2020
- Split from: Future and Freedom
- Ideology: National conservatism Social conservatism Italian nationalism
- Political position: Right-wing
- National affiliation: Brothers of Italy (2018–2020)

Website
- altoadigenelcuore.it

Alto Adige in the Heart (Italian: L'Alto Adige nel Cuore, AAC) was a national-conservative political party active in South Tyrol, Italy. The party was led by Alessandro Urzì and sought to represent the Italian-speaking minority in the province, whose official Italian name is Alto Adige.

AAC was formed in January 2013 as a locally based party upon the fragmentation of The People of Freedom (PdL), Italy's main centre-right party, in the Province. Its leader Alessandro Urzì, a long-time conservative politician who had been a member of the Italian Social Movement, National Alliance, the PdL and finally Future and Freedom, was the most voted candidate among Italian-speakers in the 2008 provincial election. In June Urzì broadened the base of his party by welcoming Maurizio Vezzali, another dissenting PdL provincial councillor who had been previously active with Forza Italia.

In the 2013 provincial election AAC obtained 2.1% of the vote and Urzì was re-elected to the Provincial Council, while all his former opponents in the PdL lost (the only elect of the Forza Alto Adige–Lega Nord Alto Adige/Südtirol–Team Autonomie list was Elena Artioli, member of the League and multi-lingual).

In the run-up of the 2018 general election Urzì aligned the party with Brothers of Italy at the country-level. On 6 July the party merged into Brothers of Italy.

== Election results ==
=== Regional elections ===
Election	Votes	%	Seats	+/–
2013	6,057	2.1	1 / 35	New
2018 (Note: In a joint list with Brothers of Italy.)	4,882	1.7	1 / 35	0
