= People's Centre =

People's Centre Centro Popolare
- Leader: Renzo Gubert
- Founded: 1998
- Headquarters: Via Oss Mazzurana 51, Trento
- Ideology: Christian democracy
- Political position: Centre
- National affiliation: Christian Democracy (2023–)
- Provincial Council of Trentino: 0 / 35

Website
- www.ilcentropopolare.it

The People's Centre (Italian: Centro Popolare, CP) is a Christian-democratic political party in Italy, active in Trentino.

The party was previously known as Democratic People's Union (Italian: Unione Popolare Democratica, UPD, in the 1998 regional election), The Centre (Italian: Il Centro) and Autonomist People's Union (Italian: Unione Popolare Autonomista, UPA, in the 2006 general election). Its long-time leader and current coordinator is Renzo Gubert, a member of the Chamber of Deputies from 1994 to 1996 and a senator from 1996 to 2006.

The UPD was originally the provincial section of the United Christian Democrats (CDU), but soon splintered from it.

In the 1998 provincial election the party won 10.4% of the vote and obtained three provincial councillors (Nerio Giovanazzi, Pino Morandini and Guglielmo Valduga), while in the 2003 provincial election it stopped at 2.2% and obtained no seats.

During his last term in the Senate, Gubert was affiliated to the Union of Christian and Centre Democrats (UDC), but he broke with that party before the 2006 general election in order to run as a stand-alone candidate in the Senate's constituency of Pergine Valsugana, where he gained 11.0% of the vote. Also in 2006, the CP suffered the split of the "People's Autonomy Movement" (MAP), led by Luciano Pilati and Guido Calliari.

In 2008 the CP joined the Christian Democracy for Autonomies (DCA). As DCA's provincial section, the CP briefly merged into The People of Freedom, whose slate for the 2008 provincial election included Gubert, who did not succeed. In the same election, the MAP ran in a joint list with Autonomist Trentino, namely "Popular Autonomists", but gained a mere 0.3% of the vote.

After this experience, the CP soon re-gained its autonomy, within the centre-right coalition.
