= PPTT =

PPTT may refer to:

- Trentino Tyrolean People's Party
- Parts per ten thousand
- Poste Italiane
