= Futura Trentino =

- President: Nicola Serra
- Founded: 2018
- Dissolved: 2024
- Headquarters: Via San Giovanni 16, Trento
- Ideology: Regionalism; Social democracy Green politics
- Political position: Left-wing

Website
- www.futuratrentino.it

Futura Trentino was a left-wing political party active in Trentino.

== History ==
Futura was founded in 2018 by the journalist Paolo Ghezzi as Futura 2018. The list took part in the 2018 provincial elections of Trento, in the centre-left coalition in support of Giorgio Tonini; it won 6.9% of the votes and two seats.

In 2019, the assembly of the party's members elected Piergiorgio Cattani as the new president of Futura, in place of the resigning Ghezzi. Later, in 2020, Ghezzi also left his seat in the Provincial Council of Trento.

In 2021, following the death of Cattani, the municipal councilor of Trento Nicola Serra was appointed as the new president of the party.

== Election results ==
=== Regional elections ===
Election	Votes	%	Seats	+/–
2018	17,670	6.93	2 / 35	New
2023	Into PD		0 / 35	▼2

== Leadership ==
- President: Paolo Ghezzi (2018-2019); Piergiorgio Cattani (2019–2021); Nicola Serra (2021–2024)
