= 1998 Trentino-Alto Adige/Südtirol regional election =

The Trentino-Alto Adige/Südtirol regional election of 1998 took place on 22 November 1998.

The South Tyrolean People's Party (SVP) and the Daisy Civic List (Civica) won the most votes at the regional level. The SVP retained its outright majority in South Tyrol, while the Civica became the largest party in Trentino. After the election, the two parties formed a coalition at the regional level. Luis Durnwalder (SVP) and Lorenzo Dellai (Civica) were sworn in as heads of the two provinces, respectively, while the Democrats of the Left and the Trentino Tyrolean Autonomist Party shared the regional administration.

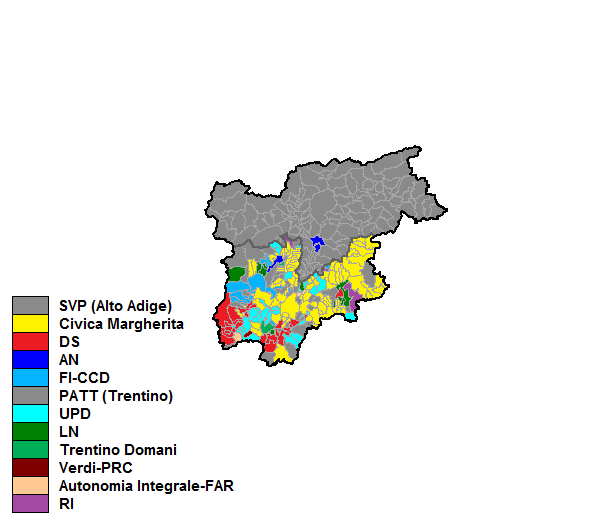
Largest party by municipality

== Results ==
=== Regional Council ===
Party	votes	votes (%)	seats
South Tyrolean People's Party	171,833	29.2	21
Daisy Civic List	62,684	10.7	8
Democrats of the Left	48,707	8.3	6
National Alliance	46,410	7.9	5
Forza Italia – Christian Democratic Centre	44,655	7.5	5
Trentino Tyrolean Autonomist Party	35,281	6.0	4
Democratic People's Union	29,600	5.0	4
Lega Nord	27,547	4.7	3
Greens	19,696	3.4	2
Union for South Tyrol	16,607	2.8	2
Trentino Tomorrow	14,685	2.5	2
Greens – Communist Refoundation Party	15,299	2.8	1
Ladins Political Movement – DPS	11,028	1.9	1
Integral Autonomy	10,732	1.8	1
Democratic Union of Alto Adige	5,340	1.8	1
Alto Adige Populars	8,239	1.4	1
Die Freiheitlichen	7,543	1.3	1
Unitalia – Tricolour Flame	6,241	1.1	1
Italian Renewal	6,188	1.1	1
Total	588,265	100.0	70

Source: Trentino-Alto Adige/Südtirol Region

=== Trentino ===
Party	votes	votes (%)	seats
Daisy Civic List	62,684	22.0	8
Democrats of the Left	38,117	13.4	5
Trentino Tyrolean Autonomist Party	35,281	12.4	4
Forza Italia – Christian Democratic Centre	33,320	11.7	4
Democratic People's Union	29,600	10.4	4
Lega Nord Trentino	24,941	8.8	3
National Alliance	17,118	6.0	2
Trentino Tomorrow	14,685	5.1	2
Greens – Communist Refoundation Party	11,170	3.9	1
Integral Autonomy	10,732	3.8	1
Italian Renewal	6,188	2.2	1
Unitalia – Tricolour Flame	822	0.3	-
Total	284,658	100.0	35

Source: Trentino-Alto Adige/Südtirol Region

=== South Tyrol ===
Party	votes	votes (%)	seats
South Tyrolean People's Party	171,820	56.6	21
National Alliance	29,304	9.7	3
Greens	19,965	6.5	2
Union for South Tyrol	16,591	5.5	2
Forza Italia – Christian Democratic Centre	11,346	3.7	1
Ladins Political Movement – DPS	11,028	3.6	1
Democrats of the Left – others	10,530	3.5	1
Alto Adige Populars	8,239	2.7	1
Die Freiheitlichen	7,543	2.5	1
Unitalia – Tricolour Flame	5,419	1.8	1
Democratic Union of Alto Adige	5,340	1.8	1
Communist Refoundation Party	4,129	1.4	-
Lega Nord Alto Adige Südtirol	2,606	0.9	-
Total	303,590	100.0	35

Source: Province of Bolzano
