= Civic List =

Civic List, or Citizens' List may refer to:

- a type of electoral system:
  - Electoral list, an independent electoral citizens' list, that is not party-affiliated
  - Civic list (Italy), a type of electoral list presented in Italian local elections which has no official connection with a countrywide political party and which campaigns on regional/local issues
  - The Civic List (South Tyrol), an electoral list in South Tyrol, Italy
- a political party:
  - Citizens' List (Kerteminde), a political party in Denmark
  - Citizens' List (Luxembourg), a political party in Luxembourg
  - Civic List (Slovenia), a political party in Slovenia
  - Trentino Civic List, a political party in Trentino, Italy
  - The Civic List (Trentino), a political party in Trentino, Italy

== See also ==
- Citizens' Initiative
