= Franco Panizza =

Italian politician

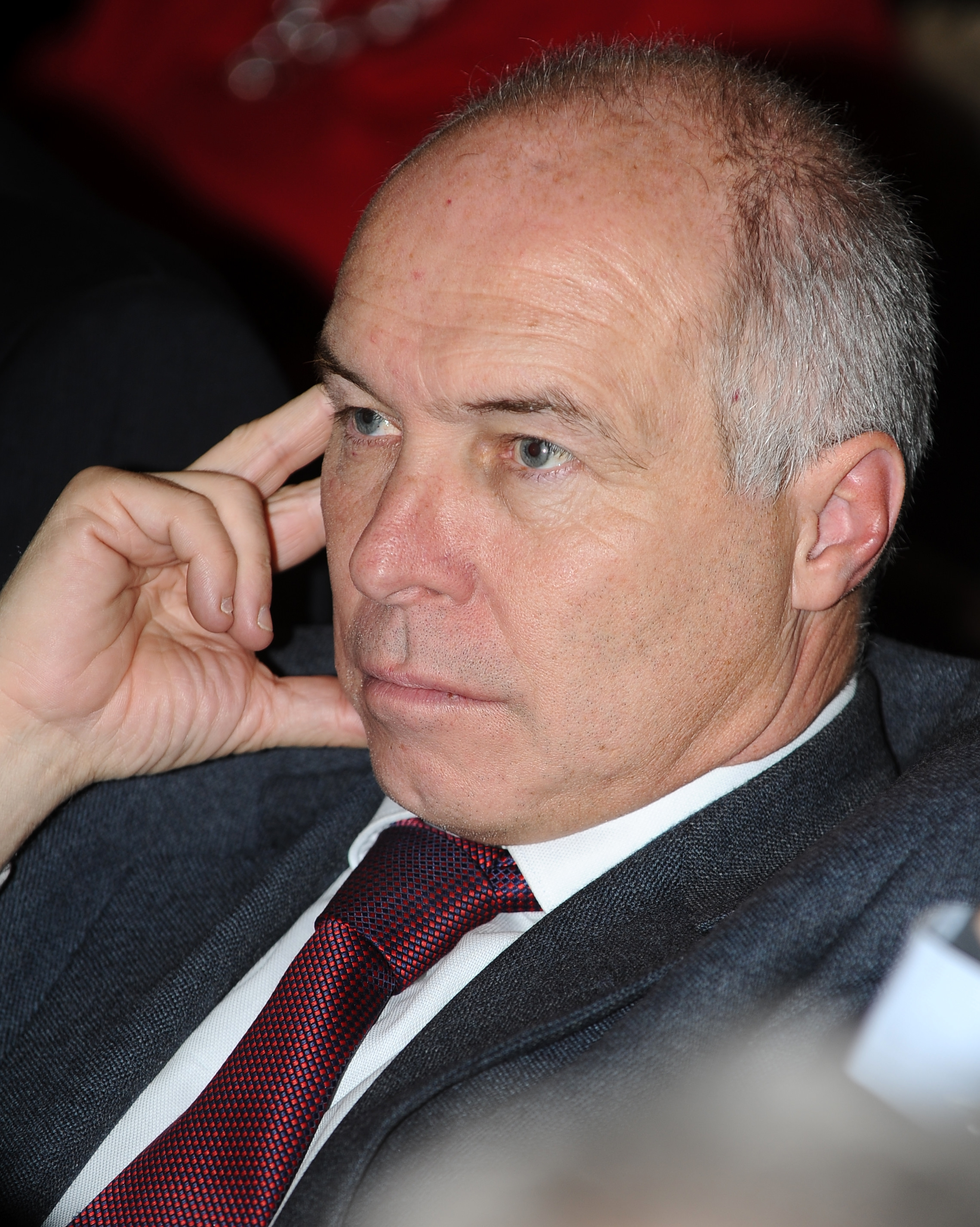

Member of the Senate
- In office 15 March 2013 – 22 March 2018
- Constituency: Trentino-Alto Adige

Personal details
- Born: December 24, 1959 (age 66) Campodenno, Italy
- Party: PATT
- Profession: Politician

Franco Panizza (born December 24, 1959, in Campodenno) is an Italian politician.

== Biography ==
Franco Panizza was born December 24, 1959, in Campodenno. He attended the scientific high school in Cles and graduated in Forest Sciences in Padua, then obtaining the qualification to free profession. He is a forest co-worker at the offices of the Autonomous Province of Trento. He was Director of the A.C.T. (Trentino Farmers Association), as well as one of the promoters of the activity of the Union of Trentino's Families abroad.

In 1998 Panizza was elected for the first time provincial councillor of Trento and regional councillor of Trentino-Alto Adige. From 1998 to 2001 he served as Regional Assessor for cooperation, credit and personnel issues. In November 2001 he was appointed Deputy President of the Regional Council. In the 2003–2008 legislature he served as Provincial Assessor, first for the craftsmanship and subsequently for the development of the cooperative economy and delegated functions in matters of cooperation and supervision of cooperatives. At the Provincial elections of November 9, 2008, Panizza was elected to the Provincial Council with 6,186 personal preferences, making him the most voted on the PATT list. In that legislature he served as Provincial Assessor for culture, European relations and cooperation.

During the Trentino Tyrolean Autonomist Party's congress of April 15, 2011, he was unanimously elected political party secretary.

In the 2013 general election Panizza was elected Senator, but in 2018 he was not re-elected.

On March 24, 2018, during the PATT congress, Panizza left the position of Secretary and was elected President of the Party by acclamation.
