= Citizens' Initiative =

Citizens' Initiative, or Civic Initiative may refer to:

- Political procedures:
  - Citizens' initiative, also civic initiative, or popular initiative, a political procedure (a form of direct democracy)
  - Citizens' Initiative Review, a panel that deliberates on a ballot initiative or referendum
  - European Citizens' Initiative, by which EU citizens can call directly on the European Commission
  - Popular initiative (Switzerland), a type of referendum in Switzerland
  - Citizens' initiative referendum (France), a form of citizens' initiative in France
  - Citizens' initiative in Germany / Bürgerentscheid, a formal citizens' petition in Germany
- Political organizations:
  - Citizens' Initiative (Andorra), a political party in Andorra
  - Croatian Civic Initiative, a political party in Montenegro
  - Citizen's Initiative of Gora, a political party in Kosovo
  - Civic Initiative (Poland), a political party in Poland
  - Civic Initiative "Serbia" (2004), a former political association in Kosovo
  - Civic Initiative "Serbia" (2013), a former political association in Kosovo
  - Citizen Initiative for Development, a former political party in Morocco
  - Roma Civic Initiative, a political party in Slovakia
  - Civic Initiative (Russia), a former political party in Russia
- Non-governmental organizations:
  - Centre-right Civic Initiative, an NGO in Romania

== See also ==
- Citizens' Alliance
- Citizens' List
