= Elena Testor =

Italian politician (born 1973)

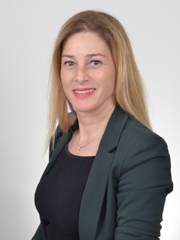
- Testor in 2018

Member of the Senate
- Incumbent
- Assumed office 23 March 2018
- Constituency: Trentino-Alto Adige/Südtirol – U03

Personal details
- Born: 20 July 1973 (age 52)
- Party: Lega

Elena Testor (born 20 July 1973) is an Italian politician serving as a member of the Senate since 2018. From 2012 to 2018, she served as president of the Fassa Association.
