= 1983 Trentino-Alto Adige/Südtirol regional election =

The Trentino-Alto Adige/Südtirol regional election of 1983 took place on 20 November 1983.

The weakened Christian Democracy continued the alliance with the South Tyrolean People's Party.

== Results ==
=== Regional Council ===
Party	votes	votes (%)	seats
South Tyrolean People's Party	170,125	29.6	22
Christian Democracy	155,180	26.9	19
Italian Communist Party	47,769	8.3	6
Italian Socialist Party	38,617	6.7	4
Italian Republican Party	26,027	4.5	3
Italian Social Movement	25,090	4.4	3
Trentino Tyrolean Autonomist Union	23,741	4.1	3
Integral Autonomy	18,056	3.1	2
Italian Democratic Socialist Party	13,400	2.3	1
Alternative List	12,942	2.3	2
Proletarian Democracy	9,676	1.7	1
Italian Liberal Party	8,434	1.5	1
Green List	8,371	1.4	1
South Tyrolean Homeland Federation	7,285	1.3	1
Party of Independents	6,960	1.2	1
Social Democratic Party of South Tyrol	3,853	0.7	-
Total	575,526	100.0	70

Source: Trentino-Alto Adige/Südtirol Region

=== Trentino ===
Party	votes	votes (%)	seats
Christian Democracy	127,847	44.2	16
Italian Communist Party	31,690	11.0	4
Italian Socialist Party	27,409	9.5	3
Trentino Tyrolean Autonomist Union	23,741	8.2	3
Italian Republican Party	20,137	7.0	2
Integral Autonomy	17,414	6.2	2
Italian Democratic Socialist Party	9,757	3.4	1
Proletarian Democracy	8,428	2.9	1
Green List	8,371	2.9	1
Italian Social Movement	8,261	2.9	1
Italian Liberal Party	6,256	2.2	1
Total	289,311	100.0	35

Source: Trentino-Alto Adige/Südtirol Region

=== South Tyrol ===
Party	votes	votes (%)	seats
South Tyrolean People's Party	170,125	59.4	22
Christian Democracy	27,333	9.5	3
Italian Social Movement	16,829	5.9	2
Italian Communist Party	16,079	5.6	2
Alternative List	12,942	4.5	2
Italian Socialist Party	11,208	3.9	1
South Tyrolean Homeland Federation	7,285	2.6	1
Party of Independents	6,960	2.4	1
Italian Republican Party	5,890	2.1	1
Social Democratic Party of South Tyrol	3,853	1.4	-
Italian Democratic Socialist Party	3,643	1.3	-
Italian Liberal Party	2,178	0.8	-
Proletarian Democracy	1,248	0.4	-
Integral Autonomy	642	0.2	.
Total	286,215	100.0	35

Source: Trentino-Alto Adige/Südtirol Region
