= 2013 Trentino-Alto Adige/Südtirol provincial elections =

- 27 October 2013
- Provincial election in Trentino
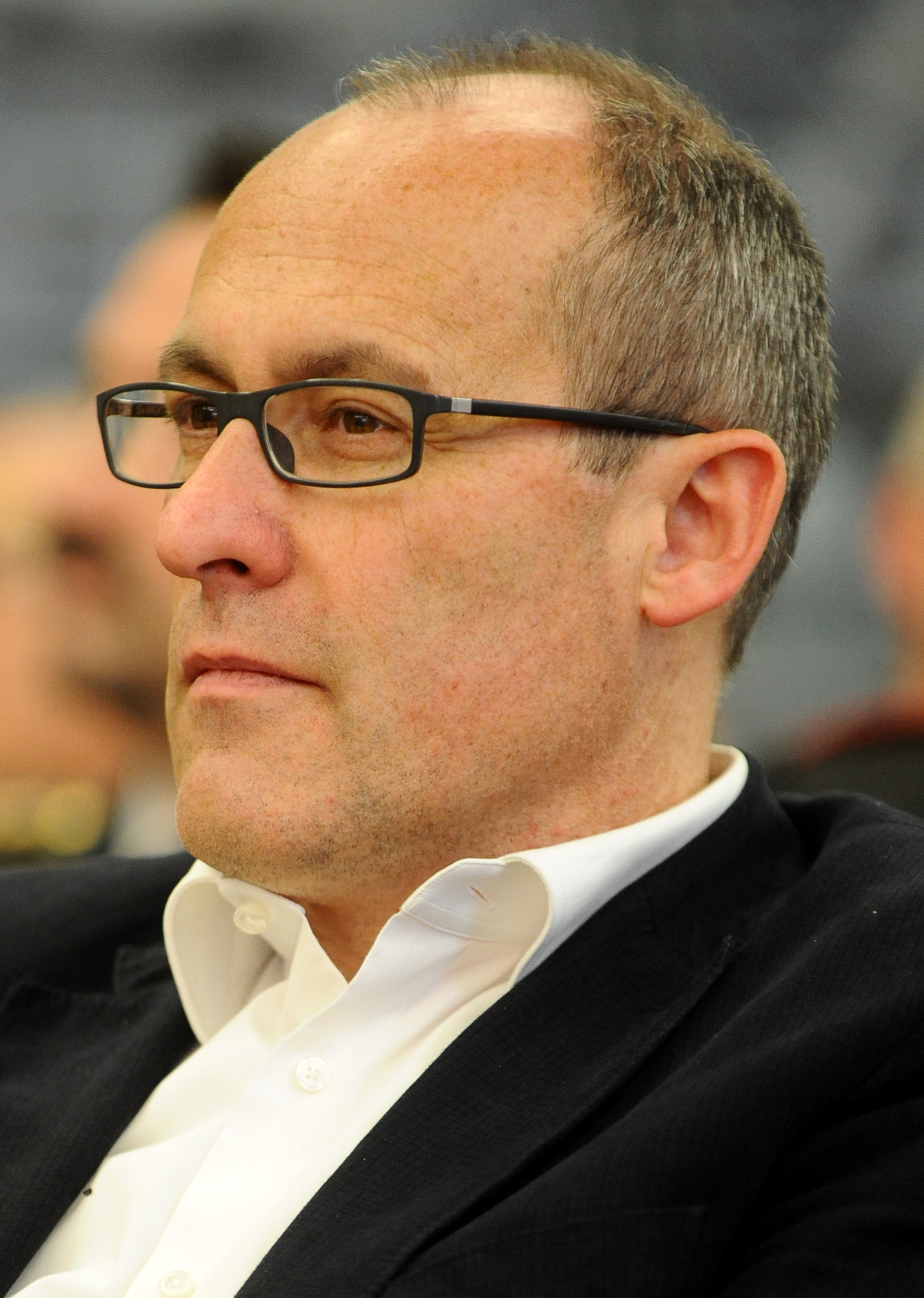

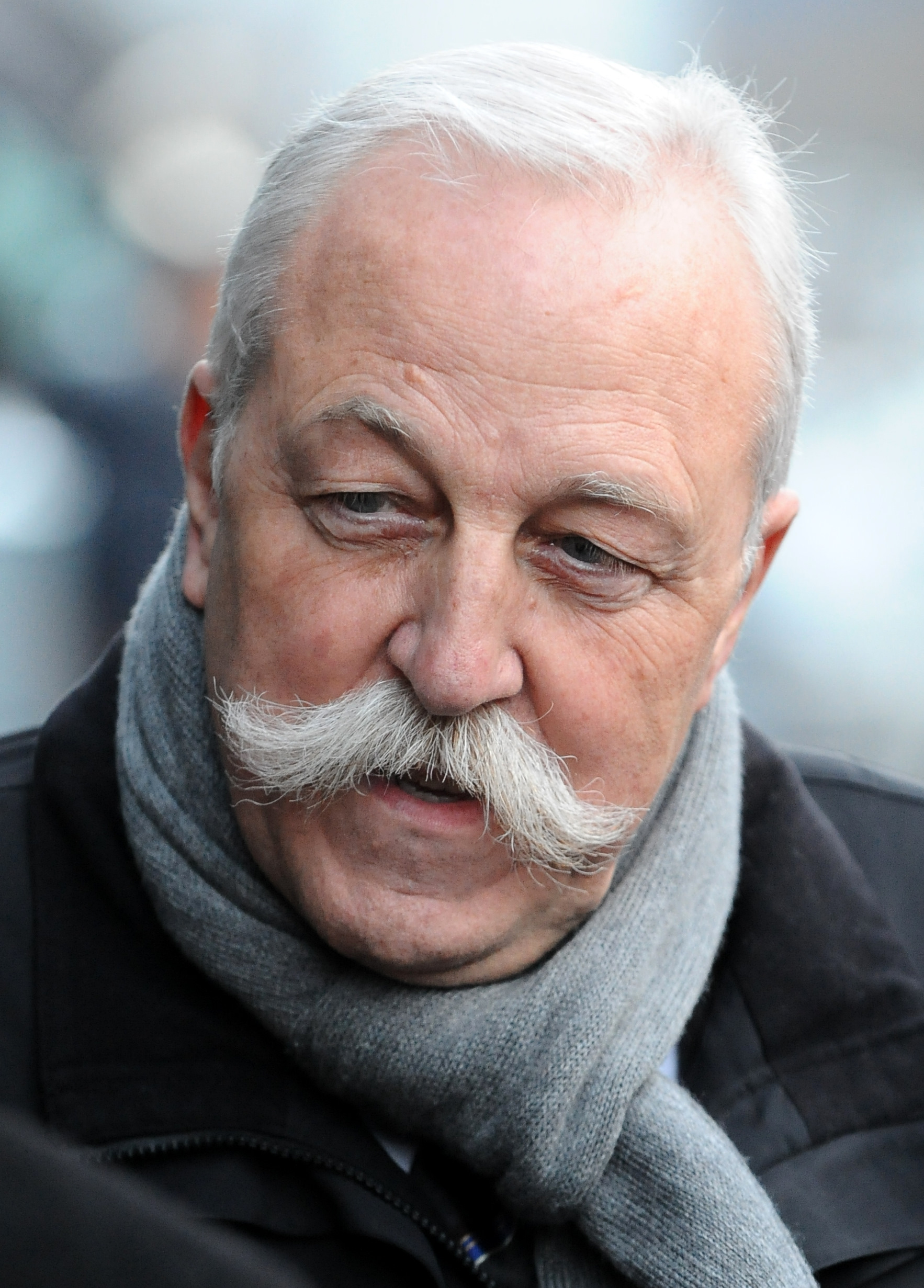

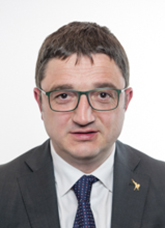

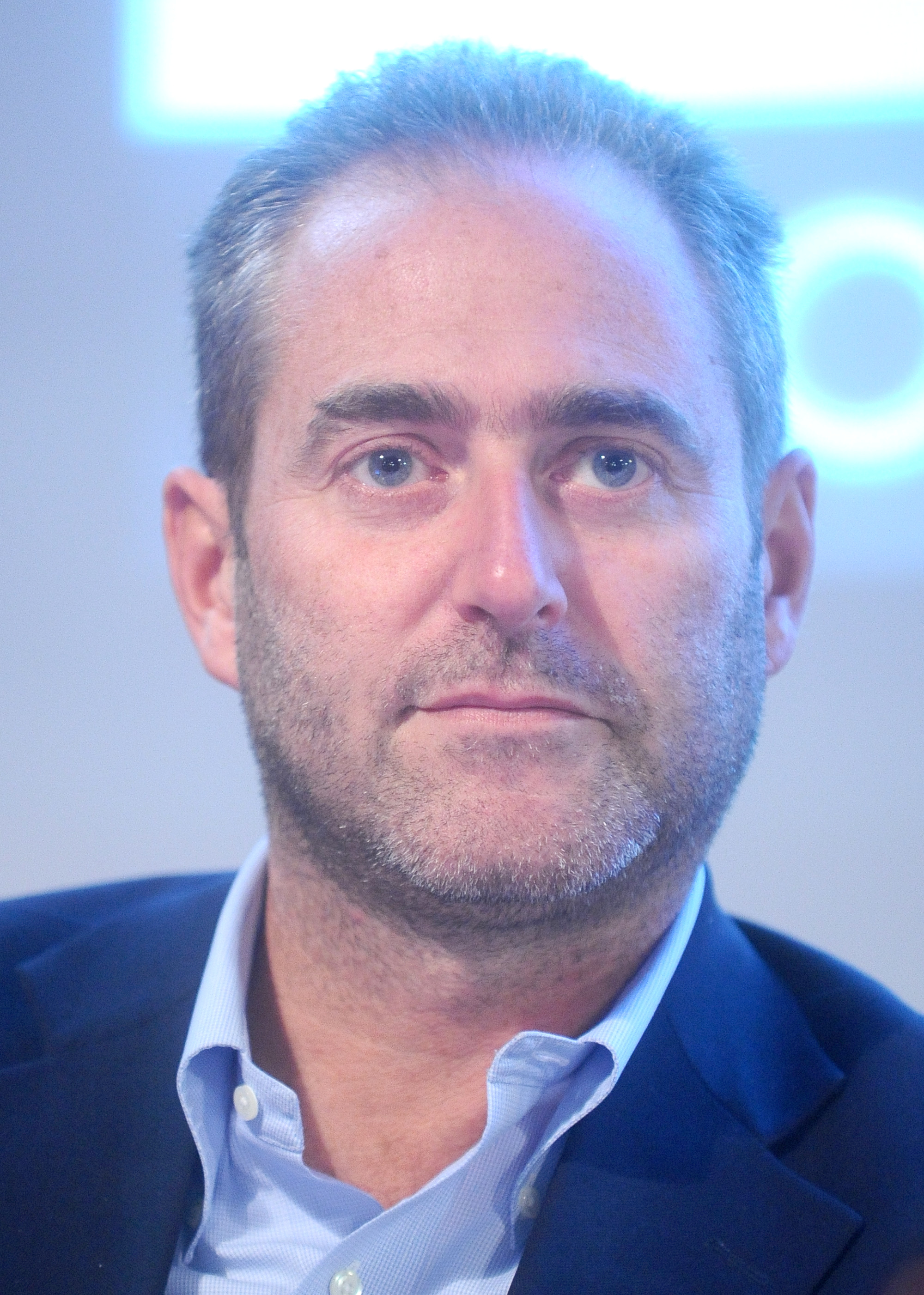
	First party	Second party
Candidate	Ugo Rossi	Diego Mosna
Party	PATT	Independent
Alliance	Centre-left	Civic lists
Seats won	23	7
Popular vote	144,609	47,966
Percentage	58.1%	19.3%
	Third party	Fourth party
Candidate	Maurizio Fugatti	Filippo Degasperi
Party	Lega Nord	Five Star Movement
Seats won	2	2
Seat change	▼5	new
Popular vote	16,401	14,241
Percentage	6.59	5.72%
Swing	▼7.85%	new
President before election
Alberto Pacher
PD
Elected President
Ugo Rossi
PATT
- Provincial election in South Tyrol
- All 35 seats to the Landtag of South Tyrol
Party	Leader	Vote %	Seats	+/–
SVP	Arno Kompatscher	45.7	17	−1
dF	Pius Leitner	17.9	6	+1
Greens	Brigitte Foppa	8.7	3	+1
STF	Sven Knoll	7.2	3	+1
PD	Christian Tommasini	6.7	2	0
FAA–LN–TA	Elena Artioli	2.5	1	−3
M5S	Paul Köllensperger	2.5	1	New
BUfS	Andreas Pöder	2.1	1	0
AAC	Alessandro Urzì	2.1	1	New
This lists parties that won seats. See the complete results below.
Governor before	Elected Governor
Luis Durnwalder; SVP	Arno Kompatscher; SVP

The Trentino-Alto Adige/Südtirol provincial elections of 2013 took place on 27 October 2013.

== Trentino ==
=== Centre-left primary election ===
A primary election to determine the candidate for President of the centre-left autonomist coalition were held on 13 July 2013. The winner was Ugo Rossi of the Trentino Tyrolean Autonomist Party.

Candidate	Party	Votes	%
Ugo Rossi	PATT	8,119	34.2
Alessandro Olivi	PD	7,980	33.6
Mauro Gilmozzi	UpT	6,610	27.9
Lucia Coppola	Greens	462	2.0
Alexander Schuster	PSI	455	1.9
Blank/invalid votes		111	0.5
Total		23,737	100.0
Source: Official results

=== Parties and candidates ===
Political party or alliance	Constituent lists	Previous result		Candidate
Political party or alliance	Constituent lists	Votes (%)	Seats	Candidate
Centre-left coalition	Democratic Party (PD)	21.6	8	Ugo Rossi
Centre-left coalition	Union for Trentino (UpT)	17.9	6	Ugo Rossi
Centre-left coalition	Trentino Tyrolean Autonomist Party (PATT)	8.5	3	Ugo Rossi
Centre-left coalition	Greens, Ecologists and Civics (VEC)	2.8	1	Ugo Rossi
Centre-left coalition	Italy of Values (IdV)	2.7	1	Ugo Rossi
Centre-left coalition	Ladin Autonomist Union (UAL)	1.2	1	Ugo Rossi
Centre-left coalition	Reformists for Autonomy (RpA)	—N/a	—N/a	Ugo Rossi
LNT – CEU	Lega Nord Trentino (LNT)	14.1	6	Maurizio Fugatti
LNT – CEU	United European Catholics (CEU)	—N/a	—N/a	Maurizio Fugatti
Forza Trentino (FT)		12.3	5	Giacomo Bezzi
Civic lists	Trentino Project (PT)	—N/a	—N/a	Diego Mosna
Civic lists	Trentino Civic List (CT)	—N/a	—N/a	Diego Mosna
Civic lists	Administer Trentino (FdI)	—N/a	—N/a	Diego Mosna
Civic lists	Together for Autonomy	—N/a	—N/a	Diego Mosna
Civic lists	Autonomy 2020	—N/a	—N/a	Diego Mosna
Civic lists	Act Trentino	—N/a	—N/a	Diego Mosna
Five Star Movement (M5S)		—N/a	—N/a	Filippo Degasperi
Left Ecology Freedom (SEL)		—N/a	—N/a	Emilio Arisi
Brothers of Italy (FdI)		—N/a	—N/a	Cristano de Eccher
Communist Refoundation Party (PRC)		—N/a	—N/a	Ezio Casagranda
Fassa Association (Fassa)		0.6	–	Alessandra Cloch

=== Results ===
In Trentino, where the President is elected directly by the people, Ugo Rossi (Trentino Tyrolean Autonomist Party, supported also by the Democratic Party, the Trentino Tyrolean Autonomist Party and other minor parties) was elected by a landslide (58.1%). Diego Mosna (Trentino Project) arrived a distant second with 19.3% of the vote, while Maurizio Fugatti (Lega Nord Trentino) came third with 6.6%.

The Democratic Party was confirmed as the largest party in the Province (22.1%), followed by the Trentino Tyrolean Autonomist Party (17.5%), Union for Trentino (13.3%), Trentino Project (9.0%), Lega Nord Trentino (6.2%) and the Five Star Movement (5.8%).

2013 Trentino provincial election results
Candidates	Votes	%	Seats	Parties	Votes	%	Seats
Ugo Rossi	144,616	58.11	1				
Ugo Rossi	144,616	58.11	1	Democratic Party	52,412	22.06	9
Ugo Rossi	144,616	58.11	1	Trentino Tyrolean Autonomist Party	41,689	17.55	7
Ugo Rossi	144,616	58.11	1	Union for Trentino	31,653	13.33	5
Ugo Rossi	144,616	58.11	1	Greens, Ecologists and Civics	4,548	1.91	–
Ugo Rossi	144,616	58.11	1	Italy of Values	3,927	1.65	–
Ugo Rossi	144,616	58.11	1	Ladin Autonomist Union	2,721	1.15	1
Ugo Rossi	144,616	58.11	1	Reformists for Autonomy	2,579	1.09	–
Ugo Rossi	144,616	58.11	1	Total	139,529	58.74	22
Diego Mosna	47,970	19.28	1				
Diego Mosna	47,970	19.28	1	Trentino Project	21,450	9.03	4
Diego Mosna	47,970	19.28	1	Trentino Civic List	8,806	3.71	1
Diego Mosna	47,970	19.28	1	Administer Trentino	5,060	2.13	1
Diego Mosna	47,970	19.28	1	Together for Autonomy	3,371	1.42	–
Diego Mosna	47,970	19.28	1	Autonomy 2020	3,160	1.33	–
Diego Mosna	47,970	19.28	1	Act Trentino	1,946	0.82	–
Diego Mosna	47,970	19.28	1	Total	43,793	18.44	6
Maurizio Fugatti	16,401	6.59	1				
Maurizio Fugatti	16,401	6.59	1	Lega Nord Trentino	14,768	6.22	1
Maurizio Fugatti	16,401	6.59	1	United European Catholics	547	0.23	–
Maurizio Fugatti	16,401	6.59	1	Total	15,315	6.45	1
Filippo Degasperi	14,241	5.72	1	Five Star Movement	13,889	5.85	1
Giacomo Bezzi	10,631	4.27	1	Forza Trentino	10,495	4.42	–
Emilio Arisi	4,425	1.78	–	Left Ecology Freedom	4,286	1.80	–
Cristano de Eccher	3,839	1.54	–	Brothers of Italy	3,699	1.56	–
Ezio Casagranda	2,848	1.14	–	Communist Refoundation Party	2,742	1.15	–
Alessandra Cloch	1,992	0.80	–	Fassa Association	1,963	0.83	–
Giuseppe Filippin	1,061	0.42	–	Moderates in Revolution	1,035	0.44	–
Agostino Carollo	829	0.33	–	Ago Carollo	793	0.33	–
Total candidates	248,853	100.00	5	Total parties	237,539	100.00	30
Source: Province of Trento – Results

Popular vote (party)
PD	22.1%
PATT	17.6%
UpT	13.3%
PT	9.0%
LNT	6.2%
M5S	5.9%
FT	4.4%
CT	3.7%
AT	2.1%
VEC	1.9%
SEL	1.8%
IdV	1.7%
FdI	1.6%
Others	8.7%

Popular vote (president)
Rossi	58.1%
Mosna	19.3%
Fugatti	6.6%
Degasperi	5.7%
Bezzi	4.3%
Arisi	1.8%
De Eccher	1.6%
Others	2.6%

== South Tyrol ==
=== SVP primary election ===
The South Tyrolean People's Party held a primary election on 21 April 2013 to select the party's head of the provincial list. Arno Kompatscher won by a landslide.

Candidate	Party	Votes	%
Arno Kompatscher	SVP	19,308	82.8
Elmar Pichler Rolle	SVP	4,028	17.2
Total		24,145	100.0
Source: Official results

=== Results ===
In South Tyrol the South Tyrolean People's Party (SVP), lost the absolute majority it maintained for 65 years, but was confirmed by far as the largest party. Die Freiheitlichen (+3.6%), the Greens (+2.9%), South Tyrolean Freedom (+2.3%) and the Democratic Party (+0.7%) made gains, while the Italian centre-right, divided in four lists (FI-LN, AAC, Unitalia and La Destra), lost votes and seats. Only five of the elected councillors were Italian-speakers, a record low.

Parties	Votes	%	Seats
South Tyrolean People's Party	131,236	45.7	17
Die Freiheitlichen	51,504	17.9	6
Greens (incl. SEL)	25,067	8.7	3
South Tyrolean Freedom	20,736	7.2	3
Democratic Party	19,207	6.7	2
Forza Alto Adige–LNAAST–Team Autonomies	7,118	2.5	1
Five Star Movement	7,097	2.5	1
Citizens' Union–We South Tyroleans–Ladins	6,065	2.1	1
Alto Adige in the Heart	6,057	2.1	1
Unitalia–Movement for Alto Adige	4,831	1.7	–
Civic Choice	4,525	1.6	–
The Right	1,654	0.6	–
Communist Refoundation Party	1,134	0.4	–
Party of Italian Communists	730	0.3	–
Total	286,962	100.0	35
Source: Province of Bolzano – Results

Popular vote
SVP	45.7%
dF	17.9%
Grüne	8.7%
STF	7.2%
PD	6.7%
FAA–LNAAST–TA	2.5%
M5S	2.5%
UfS–WS–L	2.1%
AAC	2.1%
Unitalia	1.7%
SC	1.6%
LD	0.6%
PRC	0.4%
PdCI	0.3%
