= Citizens' Alliance (disambiguation) =

Citizens' Alliance (early 1900s) was the name for local anti-trade union groups which united in October 1903 under the banner of the Citizens Industrial Association of America.

Citizens' Alliance is a common name of political and community organizations.

Citizens' Alliance may also refer to:

== Political parties ==
- Citizens Alliance (Iraq), also known as Al-Muwatin, Shia political coalition and third biggest in Iraqi Parliament after the 2014 elections
- Citizens' Alliance (Trinidad and Tobago)
- Oregon Citizens Alliance, social conservative political association in the American state of Oregon
- Citizens' Alliance (Cyprus), centre-left party in Cyprus

== See also ==
- Citizens' Initiative
- Citizens' List
