= Unitalia =

- Leader: Donato Seppi
- Founded: 1996
- Split from: National Alliance
- Headquarters: Crispistraße 6 Bolzano
- Ideology: Italian nationalism
- Political position: Right-wing to far-right

Website
- www.unitalia-movimento.it

Unitalia is a minor far-right Italian nationalist political party active in South Tyrol, Italy.

The party, founded in 1996 as a split from National Alliance, has since been led by Donato Seppi. In the late 2000s the party was briefly the provincial section of The Right and, later, of the Movement for Italy in South Tyrol.

The party first entered with Seppi in the Provincial Council in 1998 (1.8%) and was confirmed in 2003 (1.5%).

In the 2008 provincial election the party won 1.9% of the vote and Seppi was re-elected for the third time to the Council.

In the 2013 provincial election the party won 1.7% of the vote and was left out of the Council.
