= 2003 Trentino-Alto Adige/Südtirol provincial elections =

- 26 October 2003
- Provincial election in Trentino
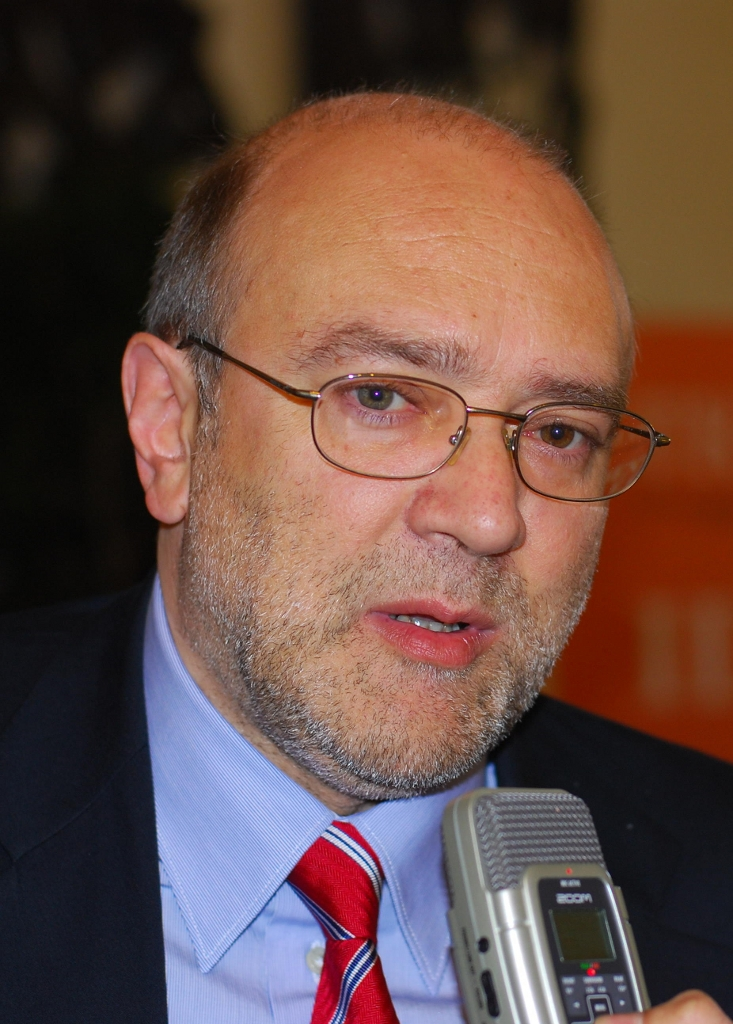

	First party	Second party
Candidate	Lorenzo Dellai	Carlo Andreotti
Party	Daisy Civic List	Autonomist Trentino
Alliance	The Olive Tree	House of Freedoms
Seats won	23	11
Popular vote	169,916	85,688
Percentage	60.8%	30.7%
President before election
Lorenzo Dellai
CM
Elected President
Lorenzo Dellai
CM
- Provincial election in South Tyrol
- All 35 seats to the Landtag of South Tyrol
Party	Vote %	Seats	+/–
SVP	55.6	21	0
National Alliance	8.4	3	+1
Greens	7.9	3	+1
Union for South Tyrol	6.8	2	0
Die Freiheitlichen	5.0	2	+1
DS – PRC – SDI	3.8	1	0
Autonomist Union	3.7	1	New
Forza Italia	3.4	1	0
Unitalia	1.5	1	0
This lists parties that won seats. See the complete results below.
Governor before	Elected Governor
Luis Durnwalder; SVP	Luis Durnwalder; SVP

The Trentino-Alto Adige/Südtirol provincial elections of 2003 took place on 28 October 2003.

Lorenzo Dellai (Civica) was elected President of Trentino, while the South Tyrolean People's Party retained by a landslide the leadership of South Tyrol.

It was the first election since the constitutional reform of 2001. Thus the former regional election was replaced by the combination of two separate provincial elections and the Region did not provide vote totals region-wide.

== Trentino ==
2003 Trentino provincial election results
Candidates	Votes	%	Seats	Parties	Votes	%	Seats
Lorenzo Dellai	169,916	60.82	1				
Lorenzo Dellai	169,916	60.82	1	Daisy Civic List	69,856	25.88	11
Lorenzo Dellai	169,916	60.82	1	Democrats of the Left	36,779	13.63	5
Lorenzo Dellai	169,916	60.82	1	Trentino Tyrolean Autonomist Party	24,261	8.99	3
Lorenzo Dellai	169,916	60.82	1	Greens and Democrats of Trentino	9,479	3.51	1
Lorenzo Dellai	169,916	60.82	1	Loyal to Trentino	7,079	2.62	1
Lorenzo Dellai	169,916	60.82	1	People's Centre	6,002	2.22	–
Lorenzo Dellai	169,916	60.82	1	Italian Democratic Socialists	5,192	1.92	–
Lorenzo Dellai	169,916	60.82	1	Ladin Autonomist Union	2,990	1.11	1
Lorenzo Dellai	169,916	60.82	1	Party of Italian Communists	2,323	0.86	–
Lorenzo Dellai	169,916	60.82	1	Total	163,961	60.74	22
Carlo Andreotti	85,688	30.67	1				
Carlo Andreotti	85,688	30.67	1	Forza Italia	36,228	13.44	5
Carlo Andreotti	85,688	30.67	1	Lega Nord Trentino	16,526	6.12	2
Carlo Andreotti	85,688	30.67	1	Union of Christian and Centre Democrats	13,667	5.06	2
Carlo Andreotti	85,688	30.67	1	National Alliance	10,996	4.07	1
Carlo Andreotti	85,688	30.67	1	Autonomist Trentino	5,853	2.17	–
Carlo Andreotti	85,688	30.67	1	Total	83,270	30.86	10
Agostino Catalano	7,891	2.82	1	Communist Refoundation Party	7,662	2.84	–
Bruno Firmani	4,285	1.53	–	Italy of Values	4,106	1.52	–
Claudio Taverna	4,107	1.47	–	Taverna List	3,817	1.41	–
Guido Gasperotti	3,192	1.14	–	Movements for Rights	3,041	1.13	–
Benito Rossi	2,213	0.79	–	Pensioners' Party	2,159	0.80	–
Giorgio Leonardi	2,092	0.75	–	Union of Democrats for Europe	1,897	0.70	–
Total candidates	279,384	100.00	3	Total parties	269,913	100.00	30

Popular vote (party)
CM	25.9%
DS	13.6%
FI	13.4%
PATT	9.0%
LNT	6.1%
UDC	5.0%
AN	4.1%
VDT	3.5%
PRC	2.8%
LaT	2.6%
CP	2.2%
LaT	2.0%
SDI	1.9%
IdV	1.5%
Others	5.9%

Popular vote (president)
Dellai	60.8%
Divina	30.7%
Catalano	2.8%
Firmani	1.5%
Gasperotti	1.1%
Rossi	0.8%
Leonardi	0.8%

== South Tyrol ==
Parties	Votes	%	Seats
South Tyrolean People's Party	167,353	55.6	21
National Alliance	25,382	8.4	3
Greens	23,708	7.9	3
Union for South Tyrol	20,554	6.8	2
Die Freiheitlichen	15,121	5.0	2
Peace and Rights (incl. DS, PRC, SDI)	11,575	3.8	1
Autonomist Union (incl. UDAA, DL, UDC)	11,179	3.7	1
Forza Italia	10,186	3.4	1
Unitalia	4,449	1.5	1
Ladins Political Movement	4,112	1.4	–
Pink Alternative	2,881	1.0	–
Party of Italian Communists	2,614	0.9	–
Lega Nord Alto Adige Südtirol	1,626	0.5	–
Total	300,790	100.0	35
Source: Province of Bolzano – Results

Popular vote
SVP	55.6%
AN	8.3%
Grüne	7.9%
UfS	6.8%
dF	5.0%
DS–PRC–SDI	3.8%
UDAA–DL–UDC	3.7%
FI	3.4%
Unitalia	1.5%
LPM	1.4%
AR	1.0%
PdCI	0.9%
LAAST	0.6%
