= Ladins Dolomites =

- Founder: Carlo Willeit
- Founded: 1993
- Ideology: Regionalism; Ladin-speaking minority interests

Website
- http://www.ladins.biz/

Ladins Dolomites was a minor political party representing the Ladin-speaking minority in South Tyrol.

== History ==
The party, whose original name was Ladins Political Movement (Ladin: Moviment Politich Ladins, MPL), was founded in the early 1990s by Carlo Willeit, president of the General Union of Ladins of the Dolomites from 1983 to 1986.

The party obtained provincial representation in the 1993 provincial election (2.0% of the vote and 1 seat, for Willeit himself) and in 1998 provincial election (3.6% of the vote, in a joint list with the Democratic Party of South Tyrol, and 1 seat). After that, the party failed to have any elects both in the 2003 and 2008 elections (1.4% and 1.1%, respectively). In 2008 the party took its final name.

In the 2013 provincial election LD ran within a three-party list, along with the Citizens' Union for South Tyrol and We South Tyroleans. The coalition won 2.1% of the vote and Andreas Pöder, leader of the Citizens' Union, was its sole elect to the Provincial Council. In Ladin areas the coalition did worse than LD alone in 2008.
