= Nerio Giovanazzi =

Italian politician

Nerio Giovanazzi (born 1 January 1948 in Trento) is an Italian politician and the vice president of Provincial Council of Trento.

Giovanazzi was elected for the first time in the Provincial Council of Trento in 1993 as member of the Italian People's Party, and was re-elected in 1998 as member of Forza Italia.

In the 2008 provincial election Giovanazzi will run for president supported by the lists Administer Trentino (Amministrare il Trentino) and Youngs for Trentino (Giovani per il Trentino).
