= 1993 Trentino-Alto Adige/Südtirol regional election =

The Trentino-Alto Adige/Südtirol regional election of 1993 took place on 21 November 1993.

The South Tyrolean People's Party (SVP) and Christian Democracy (DC) resulted the two most voted parties at the regional level. However, while the SVP retained its outright majority in South Tyrol, the DC was the real loser of the election. The party, severely damaged by the Tangentopoli scandals, lost half of its share of vote both in South Tyrol and the Trentino, where it lost many votes to the Trentino Tyrolean Autonomist Party (PATT) and Lega Nord Trentino (LNT). The Council was divided in a lot of micro-parties.

After the election, the SVP, DC and the PATT formed a coalition at the regional level. Luis Durnwalder (SVP) was confirmed President of South Tyrol, while Carlo Andreotti (PATT) became President of the Trentino. It was the first time that the Province was not led by a Christian Democrat.

== Results ==
=== Regional Council ===
Party	votes	votes (%)	seats
South Tyrolean People's Party	160,186	26.0	19
Christian Democracy	87,896	14.3	11
Trentino Tyrolean Autonomist Party	62,138	10.1	7
Lega Nord	50,210	9.6	7
Italian Social Movement	45,176	7.3	5
The Network	32,195	5.2	4
Democratic Party of the Left	28,416	4.6	3
Greens	21,293	3.5	2
Die Freiheitlichen	18,669	3.0	2
Union for South Tyrol	14,777	2.4	2
Lega Autonomia Trentino	12,014	2.0	1
Solidarity	10,025	1.6	1
Alliance for Trentino	9,192	1.5	1
Democratic Union of Alto Adige	8,392	1.4	1
Communist Refoundation Party	7,825	1.3	1
Democratic Alliance	6,945	1.1	1
Ladins Political Movement	6,058	1.0	1
Italian Democratic Socialist Party	5,273	0.9	1
Others	20,540	3.3	-
Total	616,220	100.0	70

Source: Trentino-Alto Adige/Südtirol Region

=== Trentino ===
Party	votes	votes (%)	seats
Christian Democracy	74,274	24.1	9
Trentino Tyrolean Autonomist Party	62,138	20.2	7
Lega Nord Trentino	50,095	16.2	6
The Network	29,386	9.5	4
Democratic Party of the Left	19,370	6.3	2
Lega Autonomia Trentino	12,014	3.9	1
Solidarity	10,025	3.3	1
Italian Social Movement	9,343	3.0	1
Alliance for Trentino	9,192	3.0	1
Communist Refoundation Party	5,506	1.8	1
Italian Democratic Socialist Party	5,273	1.7	1
Democratic Alliance	4,240	1.4	1
Others	17,526	4.7	-
Total	308,382	100.0	35

Source: Trentino-Alto Adige/Südtirol Region

=== South Tyrol ===
Party	votes	votes (%)	seats
South Tyrolean People's Party	160,186	52.0	19
Italian Social Movement	35,833	11.6	4
Greens	21,293	6.9	2
Die Freiheitlichen	18,669	6.1	2
Union for South Tyrol	14,777	4.8	2
Christian Democracy	13,622	4.4	2
Lega Nord Alto Adige Südtirol	9,115	3.0	1
Democratic Party of the Left	9,046	2.9	1
Ladins Political Movement	6,058	2.0	1
Democratic Union of Alto Adige	5,343	1.7	1
Others	13,896	4.5	-
Total	307,838	100.0	35

Source: Trentino-Alto Adige/Südtirol Region
