= We South Tyroleans =

We South Tyroleans Wir Südtiroler
- Leader: Thomas Egger
- Founded: May 2013
- Split from: Die Freiheitlichen
- Ideology: Regionalism; German-speaking minority interests

Website
- www.wirsuedtiroler.eu

We South Tyroleans (German: Wir Südtiroler, WS) is a political party in South Tyrol, seeking to represent German speakers.

== History ==
The party was founded in May 2013 by Thomas Egger and other splinters from Die Freiheitlichen, the second largest party in the Province. Within Die Freiheitlichen, Egger represented the "social" wing ("I was the red among the blues") and sees his party as a centrist to centre-left political force.

In August 2013 WS joined a three-party list for the 2013 provincial election, along with the Citizens' Union for South Tyrol and Ladins Dolomites. In the election the list won 2.1% of the vote, but Egger failed to be re-elected.
