= Trentino Civic List =

Trentino Civic List Civica Trentina
- President: Rodolfo Borga
- Founded: 2013
- Dissolved: 2019
- Split from: The People of Freedom
- Succeeded by: The Civic List
- Ideology: Christian democracy Conservatism

Trentino Civic List (Italian: Civica Trentina, CT) was a Christian-democratic political party active in Trentino.

== History ==
The party was formed in July 2013 by Rodolfo Borga, formerly the leader of The People of Freedom in the Provincial Council. In the 2013 provincial election the party supported Diego Mosna for President, in alliance with Trentino Project, and obtained 3.7% of the vote; Borga was re-elected to the Provincial Council.

In 2014 the CT was joined by two more councillors: Claudio Cia, who replaced Mosna, and Claudio Civettini, a splinter from Lega Nord Trentino (LNT). In the 2015 municipal election in Trento the party joined forces with the LNT, Trentino Project, Forza Italia and the Brothers of Italy: Cia, who ran for mayor, won 31.0% of the vote (and was defeated by the outgoing Democratic mayor Alessandro Andreatta), while the party's list obtained 7.1%.

As of May 2015, the CT seemed headed toward an alliance with the Trentino Tyrolean Autonomist Party, instead that its 2015 centre-right allies. This led Cia to leave the party and launch the alternative Act for Trentino, which soon joined forces with the LNT and the other parties of the centre-right.

However, in the 2018 provincial election the CT was actually part of the autonomist centre-right coalition. Maurizio Fugatti of the LNT was elected President of Trentino and the CT, with its 4.6%, was the coalition's second largest party. After Borga's death in January 2019, Mattia Gottardi was appointed provincial minister by Fugatti. Later, Gottardi and the provincial councilor Vanessa Masé declared the experience of the Trentino Civic List closed, founding a new party called The Civic List. The decision to close the party was contested by Antonio Coradello, city councilor in Trento, who declared that the Trentino Civic List was still active.

== Election results ==
=== Regional elections ===
Election	Votes	%	Seats	+/–
2013	8,806	3.71	1 / 35	New
2018	11,777	4.62	2 / 35	▲1

== Leadership ==
- President: Rodolfo Borga (2013–2019)
