= Act for Trentino =

Act for Trentino Agire per il Trentino
- Secretary: Claudio Cia
- Founded: 18 June 2016
- Dissolved: 26 December 2020
- Split from: Trentino Civic List
- Merged into: Brothers of Italy
- Headquarters: Via Baloti n° 23, Altopiano della Vigolana
- Ideology: Christian democracy Conservatism; Regionalism
- Political position: Centre-right

Website
- https://agireperiltrentino.it/

Act for Trentino (Agire per il Trentino) was a regionalist political party active in Trentino.

== History ==
The party was founded in June 2016, with its main goals being fighting against waste, determining precise rules on moral issues and self-financing, establishing a deep bond with the autonomist culture and the territories, and defending the weakest groups of the population. The leader of the new party was Claudio Cia, a provincial councilor who controversially left the Trentino Civic List a month earlier. The other founders of the party were Alessandro Boller, Cinzia Bazzanella, Franca Penasa, Giambattista Pastore, Matteo Rigotti, Michele Azzetti, Paolo Peruzzini, Roberto Pergher, Sandro Bordignon and Tiziano Salvini.

In October 2018, the party participated in the provincial election in Trentino within the centre-right coalition, in support of Maurizio Fugatti's candidacy, and obtained 2.14% of the votes and one seat (assigned to the leader Claudio Cia).

In the occasion of the municipal elections of September 2020, the party supported Marcello Carli's candidacy for mayor of Trento together with the Renaissance party, but it scored only 1.68% of the votes and no seats.

In December 2020, Act for Trentino officially merged into the Brothers of Italy party.

After his exit from Brothers of Italy in January 2024, Cia revived "Act for Trentino" within the Regional Council of Trentino-Alto Adige/Südtirol.

== Electoral results ==
=== Regional elections ===
Election	Votes	%	Seats	+/–
2018	5,458	2.14	1 / 60	New
