= Sergio Fontanari =

Italian politician (1930–2022)

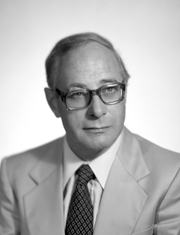

Member of the Senate of the Republic of Italy
- In office 20 June 1979 – 1 July 1987
- Constituency: Pergine Valsugana

Personal details
- Born: 19 February 1930 Pergine Valsugana, Italy
- Died: 4 May 2022 (aged 92) Trento, Italy
- Party: PPTT

Sergio Fontanari (19 February 1930 – 4 May 2022) was an Italian politician. A member of the Trentino Tyrolean People's Party, he served in the Senate of the Republic from 1979 to 1987. He died in Trento on 4 May 2022 at the age of 92.
