= Democratic Party of South Tyrol =

Political party in Italy

The Democratic Party of South Tyrol (German: Demokratische Partei Südtirol, DPS) was a minor regionalist liberal, green and social-democratic political party active in South Tyrol, Italy. It was a left-wing alternative to the dominant South Tyrolean People's Party.

The party was founded in 1997, as a continuation of the Social Democratic Party of South Tyrol, and was led by Roland Girardi.

In the 1998 provincial election the DPS formed a joint list with the Ladins Political Movement, while five years later it supported the Greens.

In 2008 most Democrats joined the Greens.
