= Civil Alliance Party =

Jordanian political party

Civil Alliance Party حزب التحالف المدني
- Founded: 24 December 2018; 6 years ago
- Headquarters: Amman
- Youth wing: Naqsh
- Ideology: Social liberalism Secularism
- Political position: Centre-left
- Colours: Orange
- House of Representatives: 0 / 130

Civil Alliance Party (Arabic: حزب التحالف المدني Hizeb Al-Tahalof Al-Madani) is a secular political party in Jordan founded in late 2018.
