= Trentino Project =

Trentino Project Progetto Trentino
- President: Silvano Grisenti
- Founded: 2 July 2012
- Dissolved: 2 February 2025
- Split from: Union for Trentino
- Merged into: Trentino Tyrolean Autonomist Party
- Headquarters: Via Degasperi 14/A, 38123 Trento
- Ideology: Regionalism; Christian democracy
- Political position: Centre-right
- Regional affiliation: Centre-right coalition (2015–2025); PATT–PT–AP joint list (2023–2025)

Website
- www.progettotrentino.it

Trentino Project (Italian: Progetto Trentino, PT) was a regionalist and Christian-democratic political party in Trentino, Italy.

== History ==
PT was formed in July 2012 as a split, led by former regional minister Silvano Grisenti, from the Union for Trentino (UpT).

In the 2013 provincial election, the party supported Diego Mosna, entrepreneur and president of Trentino Volley, for president of Trentino. Mosna was endorsed also by the Trentino Civic List, Stop the Decline, Administer Trentino, Together for Autonomy and Autonomy 2020. Mosna won a 19.3% of the vote, coming a very distant second from Ugo Rossi of the Trentino Tyrolean Autonomist Party, who was supported by the autonomist/centre-left coalition and garnered a landslide 58.1%. However, PT emerged as the fourth largest political force of Trentino, by winning 9.0% of the vote (the UpT got 13.3%) and four provincial councillors plus Mosna, who was elected as best-placed defeated candidate.

In December 2014, during the party's first congress, Marco Bettega was elected president to replace Mauro Dorigoni.

In March 2015, Grisenti was convicted of corruption and, as a result, temporarily abandoned politics. The PT participated in the subsequent Trento municipal election in coalition with Lega Nord Trentino (LNT), Trentino Civic List (CT), Forza Italia and the Brothers of Italy: in the event, the party won 3.8% of the vote, less than most of its coalition parties.

In January 2016, during the party's second congress, Marino Simoni was elected as new president. In April the PT signed a federative pact with the Populars for Italy (PpI), a minor Christian-democratic party represented in Parliament.

In the 2018 provincial election, the PT was part of the autonomist/centre-right coalition. Maurizio Fugatti of the LNT was elected president of Trentino and PT, with its 3.2%, was the coalition's third largest party. PT's Mario Tonina was appointed acting vice president by Fugatti, after the death of CT's Rodolfo Borga (who was supposed to function as vice president, due to CT's 4.6% of the vote), Tonina's appointment became permanent.

In March 2019, during the party's third congress, Grisenti was elected president.

In the 2023 provincial election, the party ran in a joint list with the Trentino Tyrolean Autonomist Party (PATT) and Popular Autonomists (AP), in support of Fugatti's re-election. In the election, Fugatti was re-elected and the autonomist joint list obtained 8.2% of the vote and three councillors, including Tonina, who would continue as provincial minister. After the election, the idea of a merger of the three parties was floated by several leading political figures and the PATT changed its statute in order to allow the members of the other two parties to participate in its upcoming congress, however PATT leader Simone Marchiori did not accept to stand down, as he was asked to do by Tonina and AP's Kaswalder. In the 2025 congress the PATT re-elected Marchiori, who was supported also by PT leader Grisenti. By that time, under Grisenti's leadership and despite Tonina's opposition, PT was no longer an autonomous party and was formally merged into the PATT.

== Election results ==
=== Regional elections ===
Election	Votes	%	Seats	+/–
2013	21,450	9.03	4 / 35	New
2018	8,248	3.23	1 / 35	▼3
2023	Into PATT		1 / 35	0

== Leadership ==
- President: Mauro Dorigoni (2012–2014), Marco Bettega (2014–2016), Marino Simoni (2016–2019), Silvano Grisenti (2019–2025)
