= Trentino Tyrolean Autonomist Party =

Political party in Italy

Trentino Tyrolean Autonomist Party Partito Autonomista Trentino Tirolese
- Secretary: Simone Marchiori
- President: Mauro Verones
- Founded: 17 January 1988
- Merger of: Trentino Tyrolean Autonomist Union; Integral Autonomy
- Preceded by: Trentino Tyrolean People's Party
- Headquarters: Via Roma, 7; 38122 Trento
- Ideology: Regionalism; Autonomism; Christian democracy
- Political position: Centre
- Regional affiliation: Centre-left coalition (2002–2018); Centre-right coalition (since 2023)
- European affiliation: European People's Party
- Colors: Black
- Chamber of Deputies: 0 / 400
- Senate: 0 / 205
- European Parliament: 0 / 76
- Provincial Council: 3 / 35

Website
- patt.tn.it

The Trentino Tyrolean Autonomist Party (Italian: Partito Autonomista Trentino Tirolese, PATT) is a regionalist, autonomist, Christian-democratic and centrist political party in Trentino, Italy. The PATT, heir of the Trentino Tyrolean People's Party, is the unofficial counterpart of the South Tyrolean People's Party (SVP), active in South Tyrol. The two are members of the European People's Party (EPP) and usually contest general and European Parliament elections together. Simone Marchiori is the party's current secretary, Mauro Verones president and Franco Panizza honorary president. The PATT has led the provincial government with Carlo Andreotti in 1994–1999 and Ugo Rossi in 2013–2018, as well as the regional government with Andreotti in 2002–2004 (when the office of president was not rotational) and again with Rossi in 2014–2016.

The party has had a diverse membership and, as a result, frequently experienced internal conflicts and splits. Centrists like Marchiori, Panizza and Rossi supported the centre-left coalition with the Democratic Party and the Union for Trentino in 2002–2018. Andreotti, Franco Tretter, Giacomo Bezzi and, lately, Walter Kaswalder, expelled in 2017, held a more conservative (and traditional) position, that resonated well with the party's grassroots. However, the alliance with the centre-left was broken in the run-up to the 2018 provincial election. The party later aligned with the centre-right coalition and especially with the alike autonomist Lega Trentino for the 2023 provincial election; in the process, Rossi switched to the centrist Action party in 2021, while several centre-left figures, notably including Luigi Panizza and Dario Pallaoro, left the party and joined Autonomy House.

== History ==
=== Background and foundation ===
The party was founded on 25 July 1948 as the Trentino Tyrolean People's Party (PPTT). The party's best results were in the first regional election of 1948 (16.8%) and in 1978 (13.1%). Between 1972 and 1976, the PPTT was represented in the Italian Senate by Sergio Fontanari.

In 1982, a split between the conservative wing, led by Franco Tretter, and the centrist wing, led by longstanding leader Enrico Pruner, occurred. The first group retained the name of the party, but then changed it to Trentino Tyrolean Autonomist Union (UATT), while the latter took the name of Integral Autonomy (AI). In the 1983 regional election the combined score of the two parties was 14.4%.

In 1988, the UATT and AI were finally merged to form the PATT.

=== Participation in the provincial government ===
In the 1988 provincial election, the PATT won 9.9% of the vote and joined the provincial government, led by Christian Democracy (DC).

In the 1993 provincial election, the party, with 20.2%, secured the best result ever for Trentino autonomists, due to the crisis of the DC. The PATT's leader, Carlo Andreotti, was thus appointed president of the Province of Trento for the successive five years, at the head of a coalition composed of the PATT and the Italian People's Party, DC's successor, and some minor parties. In 1996 a group of splinters from the PATT, led by Sergio Casagranda and Domenico Fedel (who had been more recently active with Lega Autonomia Trentino), launched a new party named Integral Autonomy (AI), which, as its namesake predecessor, represented the party's left-wing.

In the 1998 provincial election, the PATT's share of the vote declined to 12.4%, due to the presence of AI (3.8%) and, especially, the success of the newly formed Daisy Civic List (22.2%). AI entered in coalition with the Daisy, while the PATT formed an alliance with the House of Freedoms and, primarily, Lega Nord Trentino (LNT) for the 2001 general election: under this arrangement, Giacomo Bezzi stood as candidate in the single-seat-constituency of Lavis, but was narrowly defeated.

In 2002, the PATT entered into an alliance with the Daisy-dominated centre-left coalition. Consequently, Andreotti was appointed president of Trentino-Alto Adige/Südtirol at the head of a coalition comprising the SVP, the Daisy, the Democrats of the Left and the Greens.

=== The splits in the early 2000s ===
In 2001, the PATT underwent the split of the Trentino Autonomists – Gentians (Italian: Autonomisti Trentini – Genziane), that appointed Dario Pallaoro and Renzo Foladori respectively as its president and secretary. The new party was also joined by the provincial councilor Sergio Muraro, from Italian Renewal. However, in the 2003 provincial election, the Trentino Autonomists ran in a joint list with the PATT, in alliance with the centre-left. The PATT-Genziane list won 9.0% of the vote and three provincial deputies, including Pallaoro for the Genziane. However, during the term of the council, also Muraro and Dominici entered the Council in place of Franco Panizza (provincial minister since 2003) and Giacomo Bezzi.

Bezzi's choice to lead the PATT in a stable alliance with the centre-left in the 2003 provincial elections caused a further split with Carlo Andreotti, who founded Autonomist Trentino (Italian: Trentino Autonomista). In the provincial election, Andreotti, who ran for president for the centre-right coalition, was soundly defeated (60.8% to 30.7%) by incumbent president Lorenzo Dellai (Daisy), who appointed Franco Panizza of the PATT to his government. Autonomist Trentino, on the other hand, scored a mere 2.2% of the vote and no seats.

Two years later, Bezzi was replaced as secretary of the party by Ugo Rossi.

=== Alliance with the SVP and the centre-left ===
After the 2006 general election, thanks to an electoral pact with the South Tyrolean People's Party (SVP) and the electoral victory by the centre-left coalition (The Union), the PATT was for the first time represented in the Chamber of Deputies by its former secretary Giacomo Bezzi. In 2007 the Trentino Autonomists were formally merged into the PATT.

In the 2008 general election, the PATT formed an alliance with the Daisy and the SVP for the Senate (Sergio Muraro of the PATT was the candidate in the single-seat constituency of Pergine Valsugana), while for the Chamber of Deputies the PATT supported the SVP. Prior to the electoral campaign, Bezzi, who was not running for re-election, announced that he was going to vote for the centre-right in the election. Also, would-be senator Muraro did not rule out the possibility of an alliance with the centre-right, if Silvio Berlusconi would have become Prime Minister again. In the election, the centre-left was for the first time defeated in Trentino and Muraro was not elected. The loss brought the PATT into a bitter turmoil. Bezzi finally left the party and formed the Popular Autonomists (AP), along with two minor regionalist parties, Autonomist Trentino and the Popular Autonomy Movement. In the 2008 provincial election, the AP supported Sergio Divina, senator and leader of Lega Nord Trentino, as candidate for president, while the PATT remained aligned with the centre-left Democratic Party (PD) and Dellai's Union for Trentino (UpT). Dellai was re-elected by a landslide and the PATT gained 8.5% of the vote and three provincial deputies. The PATT took part to the new government of Dellai with two provincial ministers, Panizza and Rossi.

For the 2013 general election, the PATT formed an alliance with the SVP, the UpT and the PD. This led to the best result ever for the party in a general election: Mauro Ottobre was elected deputy in the SVP's list, which gained 4.8% in Trentino, and Panizza was elected senator in the constituency of Trento.

=== Leadership of centre-left and Trentino ===
In the run-up of the 2013 provincial election, Rossi of the PATT won the province's centre-left primary election.

In the provincial election, Rossi was elected president with a landslide 58.1% of the vote, while the PATT garnered 17.6% and 7 elects in the Provincial Council (plus Rossi). Bezzi, former PATT leader, stood as candidate for Forza Trentino and gained a mere 4.3% of the vote. Following the election, Rossi formed an eight-member strong government, including three ministers of the PD, two of the UpT, one of the PATT (Michele Dallapiccola) and one independent (Carlo Daldoss).

The party contested the 2014 European Parliament election in alliance with the SVP, whose list was supported also by the UpT. The list won 12.2% in Trentino.

In March 2016, the PATT held its congress. Four candidates filed to become secretary, including outgoing secretary and senator Panizza (whose supporters notably include Rossi), the party's deputy Ottobre, Dario Chilovi (supported by Kaswalder) and Giuseppe Corona (representing the "Tyrolean" separatist wing). Panizza and Kaswalder, who increasingly represented the party's conservative wing and was quite critical on Rossi, long tried to forge an agreement in order to have a jointly elected secretary Finally, Panizza and Kaswalder found an agreement under which Chilovi would retire his candidacy for secretary and endorse Panizza, while both camps would support Carlo Pedergnana for president. Consequently, both Chilovi and Ottobre retired from the race, but Ottobre, who was very critical of the pact, chose to run for president instead. On congress day Panizza was voted secretary by 75% of the delegates, while Corona took 23%. Pedergnana was elected president, by beating his former ally and mentor Ottobre 59–38%. The congress confirmed the strategic alliance with the SVP, while not embracing Ottobre's and especially Corona's Tyrolean nationalism. A few days later, Pedergnana resigned, after some old photos of him doing the Roman salute and kissing pictures of Benito Mussolini were leaked. A new congress was scheduled in June: Ottobre wanted to run again, this time with Pedergnana's and Corona's support, but he finally decided to leave the party altogether. Linda Tamanini, close to Kaswalder, who was trying to keep Ottobre and the "Tyroleans" in, was elected president with 70% of the vote.

=== Return to the wilderness ===
In January 2017, Kaswalder was expelled from the party, after months of tensions with the party's leadership and dissent votes in the Provincial Council. Kaswalder launched the Popular Autonomists (AP), while Tamanini resigned from president, being replaced by Federico Masera, and from the party itself.

In the 2018 general election, the autonomist centre-left was defeated for the first time since 1996. Under the new electoral system, which re-introduced single-seat constituencies also for the Chamber, the centre-right coalition, dominated by the Lega (LNT) and supported by Kaswalder's AP, won all such constituencies in Trentino. Panizza was defeated in the Senate constituency of Trento, while Emanuela Rossini was elected to the Chamber from the SVP–PATT proportional list.

In the run-up of the 2018 provincial election, the autonomist centre-left broke up, as both the PD and the UpT were no longer willing to support Rossi as candidate for president. The PATT thus ran as a stand-alone list, in support of Rossi. Maurizio Fugatti, long-time leader of the LNT, was elected president at the head of a centre-right coalition with 46.7% of the vote and the LNT was the largest party with 26.7%, while the centre-left's candidate and the PD stopped at 25.4% and 13.9%, respectively. For his part, Rossi won 12.4%, while the PATT was reduced to 12.6% and four councillors (including Rossi). Kaswalder's AP and Ottobre's Dynamic Autonomy won 3.0% and 2.0%, respectively.

During the party's congress in March 2019, Simone Marchiori was elected secretary with 74% of the vote, by defeating Pedergnana, who represented what remained of the party's right-wing, while Panizza was elected president. The congress also confirmed the Blockfrei option, meaning "neither with the centre-left nor the centre-right".

For the 2019 European Parliament election, the SVP and the PATT formed a technical alliance with fellow EPP member party FI, after negotiations with the PD had failed. In the 2022 Italian general election, the SVP and the PATT ran a joint list outside of big coalitions, however their joint list was supported also by the centre-right Trentino Project.

=== Alliance with the centre-right ===
In 2021, PATT's Lorenzo Ossanna joined the regional government, including the SVP, the LNT and Forza Italia (FI).

Between 2021 and 2022, three PATT provincial councillors out of four, Rossi, Paola Demgari and Michele Dallapiccola, left the party. Rossi was briefly a member of Action, while the latter two formed Autonomy House (CA), aligned with the centre-left, leaving Ossanna as the party lone provincial councillor. Between 2021 and 2023, also several other leading members, notably including honorary presidents Luigi Panizza and Dario Pallaoro, left the party and joined CA, while former leader Giacomo Bezzi had joined the Brothers of Italy.

In the run-up of the 2023 provincial election, the PATT finally decided to support incumbent president Fugatti, thus forming a regionalist/centre-right coalition. In this context, in July, it was announced that the PATT would form a joint list with the Popular Autonomists (AP) and Trentino Project (PT). In the election, the list obtained 8.2% of the vote and the election of three candidates (one for each party, including Maria Bosin for the PATT, while neither Marchiori or Ossanna were elected), while CA won 4.3% (incumbent councillor Demagri).

After the election, tensions grew among the three partners, but finally the PATT changed its statute in order to allow the members of the other two parties to participate in its upcoming congress. Also a third merger, with The Civic List (Civica), was a plausible goal. However, in November 2024 the PATT and AP broke over the organisation of a joint congress.

In February 2025 the PATT finally held its long-awaited congress, without the participation of Kaswalder and Mario Tonina of the PT, which was however represented by its leader Silvano Grisenti, a supporter of Marchiori; also Vanessa Masè of Civica was present. Marchiori was re-elected secretary with 65% of the vote, fending off the challenge posed by regional councillor Bosin. Additionally, Mauro Verones was narrowly elected president by beating Roberta Bergamo and Panizza was unanimously elected honorary president.

In the run-up to the 2025 Trento municipal election the PATT, along with Civica and "We Trentino", launched Andrea Demarchi as its candidate, separately from the other centre-right parties, including Kaswalder's AP which again broke with the PATT.

== Popular support ==
The electoral results of the PATT in Trentino since 1992 are shown in the table below.

1992 general	1993 provinc.	1994 general	1994 European	1996 general	1998 provinc.	1999 European	2001 general	2003 provinc.	2004 European	2006 general
5.7 (Note: In list with the South Tyrolean People's Party.)	20.2	18.6 (Note: This result refers to single-seat constituencies, as the party did not field a list for proportional representation.)	11.3	15.4	12.4	2.9	6.0 (Note: In list with the Lega Nord (Lega Nord Trentino).)	9.0	3.8	5.1

2008 general	2008 provinc.	2009 European	2013 general	2013 provinc.	2014 European	2018 general	2018 provinc.	2019 European	2022 general	2023 provincial	2024 European
4.8	8.5	6.1	4.8	17.6	12.2	5.0	12.6	6.5	5.8	8.2	7.1

=== Provincial elections ===
Election	Votes	%	Seats	+/–
1988	29,624	9.6	3 / 35	–
1993	62,138	20.2	7 / 35	▲4
1998	35,281	12.4	4 / 35	▼3
2003	24,261	8.99	3 / 35	▼1
2008	23,335	8.52	3 / 35	–
2013	41,684	17.55	8 / 35	▲5
2018	32,109	12.59	4 / 35	▼4
2023	19,011	8.18	3 / 35	▼1

== Leadership ==
- Secretary: Carlo Andreotti (1988–1994), Piercesare Moreni (1994–1995), Walter Kaswalder (1995–1999), Giacomo Bezzi (1999–2005), Ugo Rossi (2005–2012), Franco Panizza (2012–2019), Simone Marchiori (2019–present)
- President: Enrico Pruner and Franco Tretter (1988–1990), Luigi Panizza (1990–1994), Franco Tretter (1994–1997), Carlo Andreotti (1997–1999), Eugenio Binelli (1999–2002), Rudi Oss (2002–2007), Walter Kaswalder (2007–2016), Carlo Pedergnana (2016), Linda Tamanini (2016–2017), Federico Masera (acting, 2017–2019), Franco Panizza (2019–2025), Mauro Verones (2025–present)
- Honorary President: Franco Panizza (2025–present)

== Sources ==
- "Autonomists in Trentino", an essay by Franco Panizza
- Provincial Council of Trento – Legislatures
- Trentino Alto-Adige Region – Elections
- Provincial Government of Trento – Elections
- Cattaneo Institute – Archive of Election Data
- Ministry of the Interior – Historical Archive of Elections
