= Trentino Tomorrow =

Trentino Tomorrow (Italian: Trentino Domani) was a regionalist social-liberal Italian political party active in the province of Trentino, Italy.

It was composed of former members of the Italian Socialist Party, the Italian Republican Party, the Italian Democratic Socialist Party and Democratic Alliance. In the 1998 provincial election the list won 5.1% of the vote and got two provincial deputies elected, Marco Benedetti and Mauro Leveghi. For the 2003 provincial election, Trentino Tomorrow was transformed in Loyal to Trentino.
