= Democratic Union of Alto Adige =

Political party in Italy

The Democratic Union of Alto Adige (Italian: Unione Democratica dell'Alto Adige) was an Italian-speaking Christian-democratic political party active in South Tyrol, Italy. Its long-time leader was Luigi Cigolla. The party had a counterpart in Trentino, the Autonomist People's Union. Like their counterpart, it was the local branch of the United Christian Democrats before switch to the Democratic Union for the Republic.

The party emerged in 1993 as a local split from Christian Democracy and garnered 1.7% of the vote in that year's provincial election.

In the 2003 provincial election the party formed an alliance with Democracy is Freedom – The Daisy and the Union of Christian and Centre Democrats named Autonomist Union. The coalition won 3.7% and Cigolla, re-elected to the Provincial Council for the third time in a row, was appointed provincial minister.

In 2008 the party was merged with the provincial section of Italy of Values, which obtained a mere 1.6% in the provincial election, leaving Cigolla without his seat.
