= United Valleys =

United Valleys (Italian: Valli Unite) is a regionalist Italian political party active in the province of Trentino, Italy.

It was formed in May 2006 by former leader of Lega Nord Trentino Denis Bertolini and seeks to represent the inhabitants of the valleys of Trentino: Val di Sole, Val di Non, Valle dell'Adige, Valli Giudicarie and Vallagarina.

In the 2008 provincial election the party supported Sergio Divina (Lega Nord Trentino). Divina was defeated by Lorenzo Dellai, while the party gained 2.1% of the vote and no seats in the Provincial Council.

== Leadership ==
- President: Denis Bertolini
  - Vice President: Lorenzo Conci
- Secretary: Mirco Zortea
