= Administer Trentino =

Administer Trentino Amministrare il Trentino
- Leader: Nerio Giovanazzi
- Founded: 2008
- Split from: Forza Italia
- Headquarters: Trentino
- Ideology: Christian democracy Conservatism

Administer Trentino (Italian: Amministrare il Trentino) is a Christian-democratic Italian political party active in the province of Trentino.

The party was formed in 2008 as a split from Forza Italia by Nerio Giovanazzi, a long-time politician who had been previously a member of Christian Democracy and the Italian People's Party. In the 2008 provincial election the party won 1.6% of the vote, while Giovanazzi, who gained 2.9% of the vote as candidate for president, was elected to the council. In the 2013 provincial election the party, which supported Trentino Project's Diego Mosna for president and was part of a centrist and "civic" coalition, won 2.1% of the vote (+0.5% from 2008) and Giovanazzi was re-elected to the council.
