= Fassa Association =

Fassa Association Associazione Fassa
- President: Armando Mich
- Political secretary: Luca Guglielmi
- Founded: 2008; 18 years ago
- Split from: Daisy Civic List
- Headquarters: Strèda Dolomites n° 56, Canazei
- Ideology: Ladin minority interests Christian democracy
- Political position: Centre-right
- National affiliation: Forza Italia (until 2020); League (2020–present)
- Chamber of Deputies: 0 / 400
- Senate: 1 / 200 (Into the League)
- Provincial Council: 1 / 35

Website
- www.forzafassa.it

Fassa Association (Associazione Fassa), often referred simply as Fassa, is a minor Christian-democratic political party in Trentino, Italy. The party seeks to represent the Ladin minority in the Province and especially Ladins living in Fassa Valley.

== History ==
Fassa was formed as Fassa List (Lista Fassa) in August 2008 as a centre-right alternative to the centre-left Ladin Autonomist Union (UAL), which used to garner a large majority of Ladin votes in Fassa Valley. Its first leader was Gino Fontana, mayor of Vigo di Fassa and, formerly, provincial councillor for Daisy Civic List, a centrist party aligned with the so-called "regionalist centre-left". A year later, the List was institutionalised and became a fully fledged party under the current name.

In the 2008 provincial election, the party won 0.6% of the vote (26.6% in Fassa Valley).

In March 2012, Elena Testor was elected president of the party and Luca Guglielmi secretary. In September 2013, Riccardo Franceschetti, mayor of Moena and leading member of the UAL, left his party to join Fassa.

In the 2013 provincial election, the party won 0.8% of the vote (31.9% in Fassa Valley).

In the 2015 Fassa community election, the party prevailed over the UAL and Testor was elected Procuradora (President of the Fassa community).

In the 2016 Italian constitutional referendum, Fassa supported the No, which won with 58% of the votes in the Fassa valley.

In the 2018 general election, Testor affiliated to Forza Italia, and was elected to the Italian Senate from the single-seat constituency of Pergine Valsugana. In 2019 Armando Mich was elected new party president, succeeding to Testor.

The party confirmed its representation in the Provincial Council both in the 2018 provincial election (1.0% of the vote and 38.9% in Fassa Valley) and the 2023 provincial election (0.9% of the vote and 42.3% in Fassa Valley).

== Electoral results ==
Results are expressed in %.

	2008 provincial	2013 provincial	2015 communal	2018 general	2018 provincial	2020 communal	2022 general	2023 provincial
Trentino	0.6	0.8	–	1.0 (Note: First-past-the-post votes for Elena Testor.)	1.0	–	1.0	0.9
Fassa Valley	26.6	31.9	59.4	55.0	38.9	47.8	59.7	42.3

== Leadership ==
- President: Anita Santuari (2009–2012), Elena Testor (2012–2019), Armando Mich (2019–present)
- Secretary: Riccardo Cociardi (2009–2012), Luca Guglielmi (2012–present)
