= Giorgio Tonini =

Italian politician and journalist (born 1959)

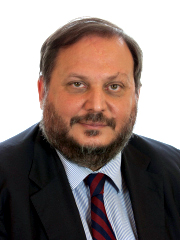
Tonini in 2013

Giorgio Tonini (born 5 January 1959) is an Italian journalist and politician. He served in the Italian Senate from 2001 to 2018.
