= Hungarian Civic Alliance =

Hungarian Civic Alliance or Hungarian Civic Union can refer to:

- Fidesz – Hungarian Civic Alliance
- Hungarian Civic Alliance (Serbia)
- Hungarian Civic Party (Romania), formerly the Hungarian Civic Alliance
