= 2008 Trentino-Alto Adige/Südtirol provincial elections =

- 9 November 2008 (Trentino); 26 October 2008 (South Tyrol)
- Provincial election in Trentino
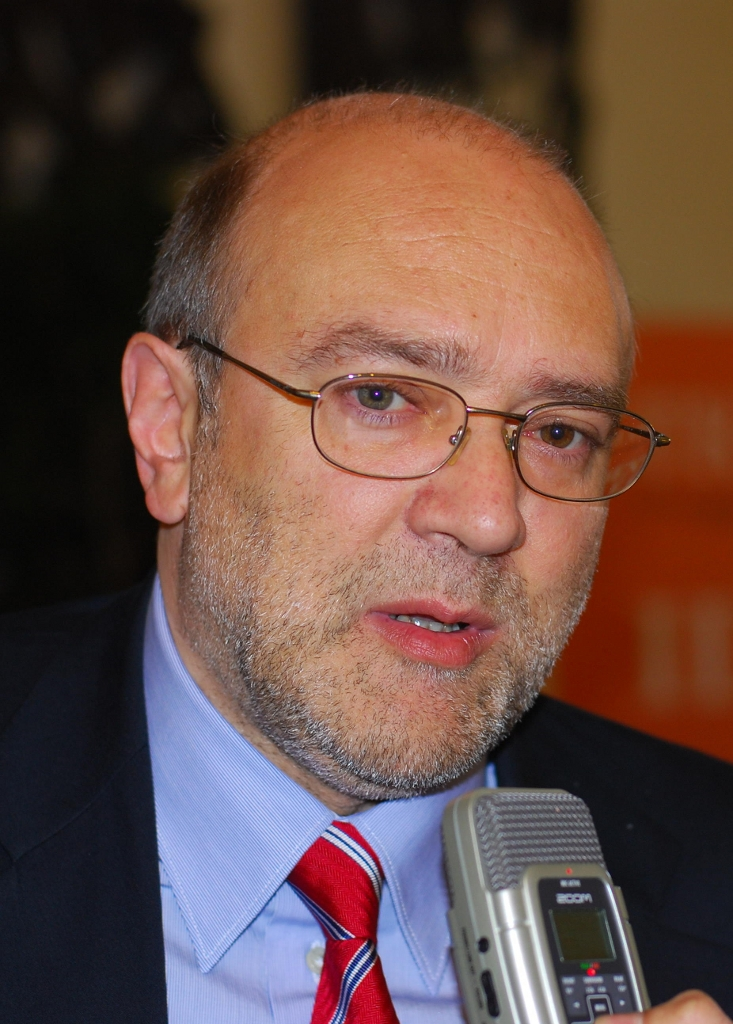

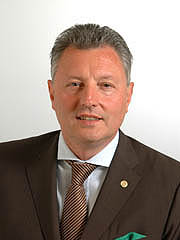
	First party	Second party
Candidate	Lorenzo Dellai	Sergio Divina
Party	Union for Trentino	Lega Nord
Alliance	Centre-left	Centre-right
Seats won	21	13
Seat change	▼2	▲2
Popular vote	185,046	105,696
Percentage	57.0%	36.5%
Swing	▼3.8%	▲5.8%
President before election
Lorenzo Dellai
UpT
Elected President
Lorenzo Dellai
UpT
- Provincial election in South Tyrol
- All 35 seats to the Landtag of South Tyrol
Party	Leader	Vote %	Seats	+/–
SVP	Luis Durnwalder	48.1	18	−3
dF	Pius Leitner	14.3	5	+3
PdL	Michaela Biancofiore	8.3	3	−1
PD	Christian Tommasini	6.0	2	New
Greens	Riccardo Dello Sbarba	5.8	2	−1
STF	Eva Klotz	4.9	2	New
UfS	Andreas Pöder	2.3	1	−1
LN	Elena Artioli	2.1	1	+1
Unitalia	Donato Seppi	1.9	1	0
This lists parties that won seats. See the complete results below.
Governor before	Elected Governor
Luis Durnwalder; SVP	Arno Kompatscher; SVP

The Trentino-Alto Adige/Südtirol provincial elections of 2008 took place on 26 October 2008 in South Tyrol and on 9 November in the Trentino. It was the first time since 1946 that elections were not held on the same day.

The Trentino election was postponed as the Union of Christian and Centre Democrats' list (which would have supported Lorenzo Dellai) was excluded from the race due to lack of signatures.

== Trentino ==
In Trentino, where the president is elected directly by the people, incumbent Lorenzo Dellai (Union for Trentino, supported also by the Democratic Party, the Trentino Tyrolean Autonomist Party, the Union of Christian and Centre Democrats, the Greens and Democrats of Trentino, Loyal to Trentino, Italy of Values, and the Ladin Autonomist Union) defeated Sergio Divina (Lega Nord Trentino, supported also by The People of Freedom, Divina Civic List, Popular Autonomists, United Valleys, Fassa Association, Pensioners' Party, The Right, Tricolour Flame and other minor parties) by a landslide.

The Democratic Party (PD) became the largest party in the Province, followed by Union for Trentino (UpT) and Lega Nord Trentino (LNT). The People of Freedom (PdL) lost many votes to LNT, UPT and the Trentino Tyrolean Autonomist Party (PATT). In fact both UpT and PATT were centrist parties, running strong campaigns at the provincial level.

2008 Trentino provincial election results
Candidates	Votes	%	Seats	Parties	Votes	%	Seats
Lorenzo Dellai	185,046	56.99	1				
Lorenzo Dellai	185,046	56.99	1	Democratic Party	59,219	21.62	8
Lorenzo Dellai	185,046	56.99	1	Union for Trentino	49,035	17.92	6
Lorenzo Dellai	185,046	56.99	1	Trentino Tyrolean Autonomist Party	23,336	8.52	3
Lorenzo Dellai	185,046	56.99	1	Greens and Democrats of Trentino	7,579	2.77	1
Lorenzo Dellai	185,046	56.99	1	Italy of Values	7,474	2.73	1
Lorenzo Dellai	185,046	56.99	1	Loyal to Trentino	6,435	2.35	–
Lorenzo Dellai	185,046	56.99	1	Ladin Autonomist Union	3,205	1.17	1
Lorenzo Dellai	185,046	56.99	1	Total	156,283	57.08	20
Sergio Divina	105,696	36.50	1				
Sergio Divina	105,696	36.50	1	Lega Nord Trentino	38,536	14.07	6
Sergio Divina	105,696	36.50	1	The People of Freedom	33,597	12.26	5
Sergio Divina	105,696	36.50	1	Divina Civic List	11,832	4.32	1
Sergio Divina	105,696	36.50	1	United Valleys	5,846	2.13	–
Sergio Divina	105,696	36.50	1	Pensioners' Party	3,597	1.31	–
Sergio Divina	105,696	36.50	1	Fassa Association	1,669	0.61	–
Sergio Divina	105,696	36.50	1	Tricolour Flame	1,652	0.60	–
Sergio Divina	105,696	36.50	1	The Right	1,643	0.60	–
Sergio Divina	105,696	36.50	1	Public Houses Inhabitants	1,375	0.50	–
Sergio Divina	105,696	36.50	1	Popular Autonomists	803	0.29	–
Sergio Divina	105,696	36.50	1	Total	100,550	36.70	12
Nerio Giovanazzi	8,401	2.90	1				
Nerio Giovanazzi	8,401	2.90	1	Administer Trentino	4,429	1.62	–
Nerio Giovanazzi	8,401	2.90	1	Youth for Trentino	2,717	0.99	–
Nerio Giovanazzi	8,401	2.90	1	Total	7,146	2.61	–
Remo Andreolli	5,653	1.95	–	Democrats for Trentino	5,363	1.96	–
Agostino Catalano	3,354	1.16	–	The Left (incl. PRC, SD)	3,190	1.16	–
Gianfranco Valduga	1,447	0.50	–	Party of Italian Communists	1,373	0.50	–
Total candidates	289,598	100.00	3	Total parties	273,919	100.00	30
Source: Province of Trento – Results

Popular vote (party)
PD	21.6%
UpT	17.9%
LNT	14.1%
PdL	12.3%
PATT	8.5%
Divina List	4.3%
VDT	2.8%
IdV	2.7%
LaT	2.4%
VU	2.1%
DpT	2.0%
AT	1.6%
Others	6.7%

Popular vote (president)
Dellai	57.0%
Divina	36.5%
Giovanazzi	2.9%
Andreolli	2.0%
Catalano	1.1%
Valduga	0.5%

== South Tyrol ==
In South Tyrol the South Tyrolean People's Party (SVP), which had governed the Province for sixty years, was confirmed by far as the largest party, but lost many votes to Die Freiheitlichen. Also South Tyrolean Freedom (a splinter group from Union for South Tyrol) and Lega Nord Alto Adige Südtirol (LNAAST) made gains, while The People of Freedom (PdL), the Democratic Party (PD) and the Greens all lost votes and seats.

After the election, President Luis Durnwalder proposed a coalition composed of SVP, PD and LNST, but finally stuck to the SVP–PD alliance.

Parties	Votes	%	Seats
South Tyrolean People's Party	146,545	48.1	18
Die Freiheitlichen	43,614	14.3	5
The People of Freedom	25,294	8.3	3
Democratic Party	18,139	6.0	2
Greens	17,743	5.8	2
South Tyrolean Freedom	14,888	4.9	2
Union for South Tyrol	7,048	2.3	1
Lega Nord Alto Adige Südtirol	6,411	2.1	1
Unitalia	5,688	1.9	1
Italy of Values	5,009	1.6	–
Union of Christian and Centre Democrats	3,792	1.2	–
Citizens' Movement	3,662	1.2	–
Ladins Dolomites	3,334	1.1	–
Left for South Tyrol (inlc. PRC, PS, SD)	2,226	0.7	–
Party of Italian Communists	1,262	0.4	–
Total	304,615	100.0	35
Source: Province of Bolzano – Results

Popular vote
SVP	48.1%
dF	14.3%
PdL	8.3%
PD	6.0%
Grüne	5.8%
STF	4.9%
UfS	2.3%
LNAAST	2.1%
Unitalia	1.9%
IdV	1.6%
UDC	1.2%
BB	1.2%
LPM	1.1%
PRC	0.7%
PdCI	0.4%
