= Popular Autonomy =

Former Italian political party

Popular Autonomy (Italian: Autonomia Popolare, AP) was a regionalist Italian political party based in Trentino.

== History ==
The party was founded in the early 90's by Domenico Fedel (a former member of the PPTT) as Trentino Autonomy League (Italian: Lega Autonomia Trentino, LAT). The party headquarters was located in Piazza Dante 15, Trento. It took part in the 1993 regional election in Trentino-Alto Adige, obtaining 2.0% of the votes (3.9% in the autonomous province of Trento) and one seat (won by Fedel). Following his election, Fedel was first appointed provincial Assessor for local authorities and for environmental restoration, then regional Assessor for the organization of regional offices and for heritage.

In the same period, LAT joined the "League of Regions" promoted by Mario Rigo along with Lega Autonomia Veneta and Lega Autonomia Friuli.

In 1996 the party changed its name to Trentino Autonomy Party (Partito Autonomia Trentino), in 1997 to Trentino Integral Autonomy (Autonomia Trentino Integrale) and in 1998 in Integral Autonomy – Regional Autonomist Federation (Autonomia Integrale – Federazione Autonomista Regionale, AI–FAR), with the adhesion of some new splinters from the PATT, including Sergio Casagranda.

In the 1998 regional election in Trentino-Alto Adige AI–FAR won 3.8% of the vote and one seat; Casagranda was elected to the Provincial Council, while Fedel failed re-election.

AI–FAR changed its name to Regional Autonomist Federation (Federazione Autonomista Regionale, F.A.R.) on 14 January 2000 and it was dissolved on 9 August 2001, the day of the death of the chairman Casagranda. The group was reconstituted on 25 September 2001 with the takeover of the councilor Caterina Dominici, who named the council group Integral Trentino Autonomy (Autonomia Trentino Integrale) and Popular Autonomy (Autonomia Popolare) from 4 March 2002.

== Electoral results ==
Trentino provincial elections

Election year	# of overall votes	% of overall vote	# of overall seats won
1993	12,014	2.0	1 / 70
1998	10,732	1.8	1 / 70
