= Ladin Autonomist Union =

- President: Giuseppe Detomas
- Secretary: Michele Anesi
- Founded: 1983
- Ideology: Ladin minority interests Progressivism
- Political position: Centre-left
- Provincial Council: 0 / 35

Website
- http://www.movimentual.it

The Ladin Autonomist Union (Ladin: Union Autonomista Ladina; Italian: Unione Autonomista Ladina; UAL) is a minor progressive-centrist political party in Trentino, Italy, that seeks to represent the Ladin minority in the Province and especially those living in Fassa Valley. Its leader is Giuseppe Detomas.

The party was formed in 1983 and, the same year, its founder Ezio Anesi was elected provincial deputy for the Italian Republican Party. In 1992, Anesi was elected to the Italian Senate for the Italian Socialist Party.

After the disappearance of the so-called First Republic parties, including the Socialists, the UAL formed an alliance with the Trentino Tyrolean Autonomist Party (PATT) at the provincial level and with The Olive Tree (l'Ulivo) at the national level. Under these agreements, Anesi was elected to the Provincial Council in 1993 from the PATT slate, while Detomas represented UAL in the Chamber of Deputies from 1996 to 2006.

Since the introduction in 2003 of a seat for the Ladin minority, the UAL has always prevailed.

In the 2013 provincial election it won 1.1% of the vote (51.8% in Fassa Falley).

In the 2015 Fassa community elections, the party was defeated by the Fassa Association, the first time since the introduction of valley communities in 2006.

In the 2016 Italian constitutional referendum, the UAL supported the Yes.

== Electoral results ==
Results are expressed in %. Before 2003, the UAL usually did not contest the elections as a stand-alone list.

	1992 general	1996 general	2001 general	2003 provincial	2004 european	2006 general	2008 provincial	2013 provincial	2015 communal	2020 communal	2023 provincial
Trentino	2.7 (Note: PSI in Pergine Valsugana and Fassa Valley.)	6.9 (Note: First-past-the-post votes for Giuseppe Detomas.)	11.1	1.1	0.8 (Note: The Olive Tree in Fassa Valley.)	11.9	1.2	1.1	–	–	1.6 (Note: UAL ran as FASCEGN and ran outside of the Fassa Valley too.)
Fassa Valley	31.9	47.7	54.5	52.1	51.0	41.9	54.0	51.8	40.6	52.2	33.1
