= Loyal to Trentino =

Loyal to Trentino (Italian: Leali al Trentino) was an Italian political party based in the province of Trentino.

It was launched in 2003 by former members of the Italian Republican Party, the Italian Democratic Socialist Party and Democratic Alliance, who ran in the 1998 provincial election within the list Trentino Tomorrow. Also former members of the Italian Socialist Party took part to that list, but they later joined the Italian Democratic Socialists. Its leading members were Enzo Bassetti and Marco Benedetti, both former long-time Republicans.

In the 2003 provincial election, the party won 2.6% of the vote and got one provincial deputy elected, while in 2008 it gained 2.4%, failing to gain a seat in the Provincial Council.

In 2009 the party took part in the municipal elections in Trento in the winning coalition supporting Alessandro Andreatta and won one seat.

The party continued to participate in the municipal elections in Dro: in 2015 scored 10.10% of the votes and in 2020 took 13.96%.

== Leadership ==
- Secretary: Marco Benedetti (2003), Severino Bombardelli (2003–20??)
- President: Enzo Bassetti (2003), Tullio Fadanelli (2003–20??)
