= Popular Autonomists =

Political party in Trentino, Italy

Popular Autonomists Autonomisti Popolari
- President: Walter Kaswalder
- Founded: 2017
- Dissolved: 2023
- Split from: Trentino Tyrolean Autonomist Party
- Merged into: Trentino Tyrolean Autonomist Party
- Headquarters: Via al Castello n° 23, Altopiano della Vigolana
- Ideology: Regionalism; Autonomism; Christian democracy
- Political position: Centre
- Regional affiliation: Centre-right coalition

The Popular Autonomists (Italian: Autonomisti Popolari, AP) were a regionalist, autonomist and Christian-democratic political party in Trentino, Italy.

The party was formed in 2017 by Walter Kaswalder, after his ejection from the Trentino Tyrolean Autonomist Party.

In the 2018 provincial election, the AP were part of the autonomist centre-right coalition, led by Maurizio Fugatti of Lega Trentino, who was elected President of Trentino. The AP won 3.0% of the vote and Kaswalder was elected president of the Provincial Council.

In the 2023 provincial election, the party ran in a joint list with the PATT and Trentino Project, in support of Fugatti's re-election. In the election, Fugatti was re-elected and the autonomist joint list obtained 8.2% of the vote and three councillors, including Kaswalder.

== Election results ==
=== Regional elections ===
| Election | Votes | % | Seats | +/– |
|---|---|---|---|---|
| 2018 | 7,621 | 2.99 | 1 / 35 | New |
| 2023 | Into PATT | | 1 / 35 | 0 |

== Leadership ==
- President: Walter Kaswalder (2017–2023)
- Spokesperson: Michele Condini (2018–2023)
