= Alessandro Urzì =

Italian politician (born 1966)

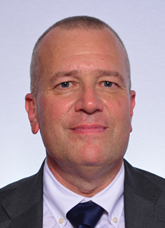
- Urzì in 2020

Member of the Chamber of Deputies
- Incumbent
- Assumed office 13 October 2022
- Constituency: Veneto 2 – 02

Personal details
- Born: 7 May 1966 (age 59)
- Party: Brothers of Italy (since 2012)

Alessandro Urzì (born 7 May 1966) is an Italian politician serving as a member of the Chamber of Deputies since 2022. He has served as coordinator of Brothers of Italy in Trentino-Alto Adige/Südtirol since 2017.
