= Trentino Tyrolean Autonomist Union =

The Trentino Tyrolean Autonomist Union (Italian: Unione Autonomista Trentino Tirolese, UATT) was a regionalist Christian-democratic Italian political party based in Trentino which was active from 1982 to 1988.

== History ==
In 1982 the Trentino Tyrolean People's Party broke up: the more conservative wing formed the UATT, while the more centrist wing formed Integral Autonomy. The leader of the conservative faction and thus of the UATT was Franco Tretter.

In the 1983 provincial election the UATT won 8.2% of the vote, while Enrico Pruner's Integral Autonomy only the 3.1%.

In 1988 the two parties merged into the Trentino Tyrolean Autonomist Party, which gained 9.9% in the subsequent provincial election.

== Sources ==
- "Autonomists in Trentino", an essay by Franco Panizza
- Provincial Council of Trento – Legislatures
- Trentino Alto-Adige Region – Elections
- Provincial Government of Trento – Elections
- Cattaneo Institute – Archive of Election Data
- Parties and Elections in Europe – Province of Trento
- Ministry of the Interior – Historical Archive of Elections
