= Integral Autonomy (1982) =

Integral Autonomy (Italian: Autonomia Integrale, AI) was a regionalist Christian-democratic Italian political party based in Trentino. It was also known as PPTT–UE–Two Edelweiss (Partito Popolare Trentino Tirolese per l'Unione Europea – due stelle alpine).

== History ==
In 1982 the Trentino Tyrolean People's Party (PPTT) broke up: the more conservative wing formed the Trentino Tyrolean Autonomist Union (UATT), while the more centrist wing formed Integral Autonomy, under the leadership of the longstanding leader of the PPTT Enrico Pruner.

In the 1983 provincial election Integral Autonomy won only 3.1% of the vote, while Franco Tretter's UATT the much higher 8.2%. In the 1984 European Parliament election, it joined Liga Veneta's Union for a Federalist Europe.

In 1988 the two parties merged into the Trentino Tyrolean Autonomist Party, which gained 9.9% in the subsequent provincial election.

== Sources ==
- "Autonomists in Trentino", an essay by Franco Panizza
- Provincial Council of Trento – Legislatures
- Trentino Alto-Adige Region – Elections
- Provincial Government of Trento – Elections
- Cattaneo Institute – Archive of Election Data
- Parties and Elections in Europe – Province of Trento
- Ministry of the Interior – Historical Archive of Elections
