= The Civic List (Trentino) =

The Civic List La Civica
- President: Mattia Gottardi
- Founded: 2019
- Preceded by: Trentino Civic List
- Headquarters: Via Nazario Sauro 2, Tione di Trento
- Ideology: Regionalism; Christian democracy
- Political position: Centre
- Regional affiliation: Centre-right coalition
- Provincial Council: 4 / 35

Website
- www.lacivica.net

The Civic List (Italian: La Civica, LC) is a regionalist political party active in Trentino.

== History ==
La Civica was founded in 2019, following the death of Rodolfo Borga, founder and leader of the Trentino Civic List, by provincial assessor Mattia Gottardi and provincial councilor Vanessa Masè, who considered their former party formally closed. Gottardi and Masè also explained that for structural, formal, organizational and legal reasons, the logo of the Trentino Civic List would no longer be usable for future elections.

The decision to close the former party was contested by Antonio Coradello, city councilor in Trento, who harshly criticized Gottardi and Masé and declared that the Trentino Civic List was still active.

In the 2023 provincial election, the party won 4.9% of the vote and two councillors, Gottardi and Masè.

In the 2024 European Parliament election, the party supported the South Tyrolean People's Party (SVP).

In June 2025 the party was joined by two more provincial councillors, Carlo Daldoss and Christian Girardi, most recently elected with Brothers of Italy.

== Election results ==
=== European Parliament ===
Election	Leader	Votes	%	Seats	+/–	EP Group
2024	Mattia Gottardi	Into SVP		0 / 76	New	–

=== Provincial Council of Trentino ===
Election	Leader	Votes	%	Seats	+/–
2023	Mattia Gottardi	11,285	4.85	2 / 35	New

== Leadership ==
- President: Mattia Gottardi (2019–present)
