= Trentino Tyrolean People's Party =

The Trentino Tyrolean People's Party (Italian: Partito Popolare Trentino Tirolese, PPTT) was a regionalist Christian-democratic political party based in Trentino, Italy. The party was active from 1948 to 1982. Its main successor is the Trentino Tyrolean Autonomist Party, incorporated in 1988.

== History ==
The PPTT was formed on 25 July 1948 as the transformation into political party of the Association Autonomistic Regional Studies (Associazione Studi Autonomistici Regionali, ASAR). ASAR, whose slogan was "integral autonomy from Borghetto to Brenner", was a group which fought successfully for the establishment of the Trentino-Alto Adige/Südtirol as special statute Region.

In the 1948 provincial election the party won 16.8% of the vote and became a junior partner in Christian Democracy-led government. The PPTT, whose longstanding leader was Enrico Pruner, became the sister-party of the South Tyrolean People's Party, although the two were independent parties.

Since the 1979 general election the party was represented in the Senate by Sergio Fontanari.

In 1982 a split between the conservative wing, led by Franco Tretter, and the centrist wing of the party, led by longstanding leader Enrico Pruner. The first group retained the name of the party but later changed it to Trentino Tyrolean Autonomist Union, while second one took the name of Integral Autonomy. In 1988 the two groups merged into the Trentino Tyrolean Autonomist Party.

== Leadership ==
- Secretary: Raffaello Zanghellini (1948–1952), Enrico Pruner (1952–1982)
- President: Silvio Bortolotti (1948–1952), Iginio Caproni (1952–1956), Giuseppe Stoffella (1956–1962), Guido Sembenotti (1962–TBD), Carlo Jellici (TBD–TBD), Sergio Fontanari (TBD–1982)

== Sources ==
- "Autonomists in Trentino", an essay by Franco Panizza
- Provincial Council of Trento – Legislatures
- Trentino Alto-Adige Region – Elections
- Provincial Government of Trento – Elections
- Cattaneo Institute – Archive of Election Data
- Parties and Elections in Europe – Province of Trento
- Ministry of the Interior – Historical Archive of Elections
