= Politics of Trentino-Alto Adige/Südtirol =

Politice of region of Italy

The politics of Trentino-Alto Adige/Südtirol, a region of Italy, takes place in the framework of a parliamentary representative democracy, whereby the President of Regional Government is the head of government, and of a pluriform multi-party system. Executive power is exercised by the Regional Government and Legislative power is vested in both the government and the Regional Council. However, since a constitutional reform in 1972, almost all the executive and legislative powers are devolved to the two provinces of which the region is composed: Trentino and the South Tyrol.

The politics of Trentino takes place in the framework of an "anomalous presidential" representative democracy or prime-ministerial system with an executive presidency, whereby the president is heads of government, while the politics of South Tyrol retains a parliamentary system, in which the governor is usually the most voted provincial deputy and heads the provincial government.

== Executive branch ==
The Regional Government (Giunta Regionale, Regionalregierung) is presided by the President of the Region (Presidente della Regione, Präsident der Region) and is composed by the President and the Ministers (Assessori, Regionalassessoren), who are currently 5, including two Vice presidents. Since 2001, the presidents of the two Provinces alternate as President of the Region, with the one who's not in charge serving as First Vice President.

=== List of presidents ===
Presidents of Trentino-Alto Adige/Südtirol
President	Party	Term	Legislature
Tullio Odorizzi	DC	1948–1953	I Legislature
Tullio Odorizzi	DC	1953–1957	II Legislature
Tullio Odorizzi	DC	1957–1961	III Legislature
Luigi Dalvit	DC	1961–1965	IV Legislature
Luigi Dalvit	DC	1965–1967	V Legislature
Giorgio Grigolli	DC	1967–1969	V Legislature
Giorgio Grigolli	DC	1969–1973	VI Legislature
Bruno Kessler	DC	1974–1976	VII Legislature
Flavio Mengoni	DC	1976–1977	VII Legislature
Spartaco Marziani	DC	1977–1979	VII Legislature
Enrico Pancheri	DC	1979–1984	VIII Legislature
Pierluigi Angeli	DC	1984–1987	IX Legislature
Gianni Bazzanella	DC	1987–1989	IX Legislature
Gianni Bazzanella	DC	1989–1992	X Legislature
Tarcisio Andreolli	DC	1992–1994	X Legislature
Tarcisio Grandi	PPI	1994–1999	XI Legislature
Margherita Cogo	DS	1999–2002	XII Legislature
Carlo Andreotti	PATT	2002–2004	XII Legislature
Luis Durnwalder	SVP	2004–2006	XIII Legislature
Lorenzo Dellai	Civica	2006–2008	XIII Legislature
Luis Durnwalder	SVP	2008–2011	XIV Legislature
Lorenzo Dellai	UpT	2011–2013	XIV Legislature
Alberto Pacher	PD	2013–2014	XIV Legislature
Ugo Rossi	PATT	2014–2016	XV Legislature
Arno Kompatscher	SVP	2016–2018	XV Legislature
Arno Kompatscher	SVP	2018–2021	XVI Legislature
Maurizio Fugatti	LT	2021–2024	XVI Legislature
Arno Kompatscher	SVP	2024–present	XVII Legislature

== Legislative branch ==
The Regional Council of Trentino-Alto Adige/Südtirol is composed of 70 members, 35 from Trentino and 35 from South Tyrol. The regional deputies are elected separately as provincial deputies. In practice the Regional Council is the meeting of the two Provincial Councils.

=== Current composition ===
The current legislature of the Regional Council of Trentino-Alto Adige/Südtirol is XVIi which follows the regional election of 2023 The composition of the legislature is followed,

Party	Seats
South Tyrolean People's Party	13 / 70
Democratic Party	8 / 70
Lega Trentino – Lega Alto Adige Südtirol	6 / 70
Campobase	5 / 70
Trentino Tyrolean Autonomist Party – Fassa Association	5 / 70
Brothers of Italy	4 / 70
Team K	4 / 70
South Tyrolean Freedom	4 / 70
Green Group (incl. Greens and Green Europe)	4 / 70
The Civic List (Trentino)	4 / 70
We Trentino for Fugatti for President (Lega Trentino)	3 / 70
Forza Italia	2 / 70
Vita – Us Citizens	2 / 70
The Civic List (South Tyrol)	2 / 70
Mixed group	4 / 70

== Political parties and elections ==
The Region has actually two different system of parties: one for each Province. Since the constitutional reform of 2001, regional elections are nothing more than two separate provincial elections and the Region does not provide anymore vote totals region-wide.

== Politics of Trentino ==
=== Executive branch ===
==== List of presidents ====
President		Term of office		Party	Administration	Coalition	Legislature
President		Duration in years, months and days		Party	Administration	Coalition	Legislature
1	Giuseppe Balista (1901–1977)	20 December 1948	19 December 1952	DC	Balista I	DC	I (1948)
1	Giuseppe Balista (1901–1977)	4 years		DC	Balista II	DC	I (1948)
2	Remo Albertini (1920–2005)	19 December 1952	14 December 1956	DC	Albertini	DC	II (1952)
2	Remo Albertini (1920–2005)	3 years, 11 months and 26 days		DC	Albertini	DC	II (1952)
3	Riccardo Rosa (1902–1970)	14 December 1956	30 December 1960	DC	Rosa	DC	III (1956)
3	Riccardo Rosa (1902–1970)	4 years and 17 days		DC	Rosa	DC	III (1956)
4	Bruno Kessler (1924–1991)	30 December 1960	13 March 1974	DC	Kessler I	DC	IV (1960)
4	Bruno Kessler (1924–1991)	30 December 1960	13 March 1974	DC	Kessler II	DC • PSI	V (1964)
4	Bruno Kessler (1924–1991)	13 years, 2 months and 14 days		DC	Kessler III	DC	VI (1968)
5	Giorgio Grigolli (1927–2016)	13 March 1974	15 March 1979	DC	Grigolli I	DC • PSDI • PRI	VII (1973)
5	Giorgio Grigolli (1927–2016)	5 years and 3 days		DC	Grigolli II	DC	VII (1973)
6	Flavio Mengoni (1929–2013)	15 March 1979	30 October 1985	DC	Mengoni I	DC • PRI	VIII (1978)
6	Flavio Mengoni (1929–2013)	15 March 1979	30 October 1985	DC	Mengoni II	DC • PRI	VIII (1978)
6	Flavio Mengoni (1929–2013)	15 March 1979	30 October 1985	DC	Mengoni III	DC • PSDI • PLI	VIII (1978)
6	Flavio Mengoni (1929–2013)	15 March 1979	30 October 1985	DC	Mengoni IV	DC • PSDI • PLI	VIII (1978)
6	Flavio Mengoni (1929–2013)	6 years, 7 months and 16 days		DC	Mengoni V	DC • PRI • PLI	IX (1983)
7	Pierluigi Angeli (born 1938)	30 October 1985	16 February 1989	DC	Angeli	DC • PSI • PRI	IX (1983)
7	Pierluigi Angeli (born 1938)	3 years, 3 months and 18 days		DC	Angeli	DC • PSI • PRI	IX (1983)
8	Mario Malossini (born 1947)	16 February 1989	4 June 1992	DC	Malossini	DC • PSI	X (1988)
8	Mario Malossini (born 1947)	3 years, 3 months and 20 days		DC	Malossini	DC • PSI	X (1988)
9	Gianni Bazzanella (born 1940)	4 June 1992	4 March 1994	DC	Bazzanella	DC • PSI • PSDI	X (1988)
9	Gianni Bazzanella (born 1940)	1 year, 9 months and 1 day		DC	Bazzanella	DC • PSI • PSDI	X (1988)
10	Carlo Andreotti (born 1943)	4 March 1994	24 February 1999	PATT	Andreotti	PATT • PRI • PSDI	XI (1993)
10	Carlo Andreotti (born 1943)	4 years, 11 months and 21 days		PATT	Andreotti	PATT • PRI • PSDI	XI (1993)
11	Lorenzo Dellai (born 1959)	24 February 1999	29 December 2012	DL	Dellai I	The Olive Tree (DL • DS • FdV)	XII (1998)
11	Lorenzo Dellai (born 1959)	24 February 1999	29 December 2012	DL	Dellai II	The Olive Tree (DL • DS)	XIII (2003)
11	Lorenzo Dellai (born 1959)	24 February 1999	29 December 2012	UpT	Dellai III	PD • UpT • PATT	XIV (2008)
11	Lorenzo Dellai (born 1959)	13 years, 10 months and 6 days		UpT	Dellai III	PD • UpT • PATT	XIV (2008)
-	Alberto Pacher (born 1956)	29 December 2012	9 November 2013	PD	Pacher	PD • UpT • PATT	XIV (2008)
-	Alberto Pacher (born 1956)	10 months and 12 days		PD	Pacher	PD • UpT • PATT	XIV (2008)
12	Ugo Rossi (born 1963)	9 November 2013	2 November 2018	PATT	Rossi	PD • UpT • PATT	XV (2013)
12	Ugo Rossi (born 1963)	4 years, 11 months and 25 days		PATT	Rossi	PD • UpT • PATT	XV (2013)
13	Maurizio Fugatti (born 1972)	2 November 2018	Incumbent	LT	Fugatti I	LT • FI • CT	XVI (2018)
13	Maurizio Fugatti (born 1972)	7 years, 8 months and 17 days		LT	Fugatti II	LT • FdI • PATT	XVII (2023)

=== Legislative branch ===
==== Latest provincial election ====
2023 Trentino provincial election results
Candidates	Votes	%	Seats	Parties	Votes	%	Seats	+/−
Maurizio Fugatti	129,758	51.82	1					
Maurizio Fugatti	129,758	51.82	1	Trentino League	30,347	13.05	5	–8
Maurizio Fugatti	129,758	51.82	1	Brothers of Italy	28,714	12.35	5	+4
Maurizio Fugatti	129,758	51.82	1	Fugatti for President	24,953	10.73	4	New
Maurizio Fugatti	129,758	51.82	1	Trentino Tyrolean Autonomist Party	19,011	8.18	3	–3
Maurizio Fugatti	129,758	51.82	1	La Civica	11,285	4.85	2	±0
Maurizio Fugatti	129,758	51.82	1	Forza Italia	4,708	2.02	0	–1
Maurizio Fugatti	129,758	51.82	1	Fassa Association	2,018	0.87	1	±0
Maurizio Fugatti	129,758	51.82	1	Union of the Centre	1,362	0.59	0	±0
Maurizio Fugatti	129,758	51.82	1	Total	122,398	52.64	20	–4
Francesco Valduga	93,888	37.50	1					
Francesco Valduga	93,888	37.50	1	Democratic Party	38,689	16.64	7	+3
Francesco Valduga	93,888	37.50	1	Campobase	19,553	8.41	3	+2
Francesco Valduga	93,888	37.50	1	Autonomy House	9,968	4.29	1	New
Francesco Valduga	93,888	37.50	1	Greens and Left Alliance	7,565	3.25	1	+1
Francesco Valduga	93,888	37.50	1	Fascegn	3,634	1.56	0	±0
Francesco Valduga	93,888	37.50	1	Italia Viva	3,399	1.46	0	New
Francesco Valduga	93,888	37.50	1	Action	3,302	1.42	0	New
Francesco Valduga	93,888	37.50	1	Total	86,110	37.03	12	+5
Filippo Degasperi	9,533	3.81	1					
Filippo Degasperi	9,533	3.81	1	Wave	5,864	2.52	0	New
Filippo Degasperi	9,533	3.81	1	My Valley	1,204	0.52	0	New
Filippo Degasperi	9,533	3.81	1	People's Union	1,088	0.47	0	±0
Filippo Degasperi	9,533	3.81	1	Total	8,156	3.51	0	—
Marco Rizzo	5,651	2.26	0	Sovereign Popular Democracy	5,457	2.35	0	New
Sergio Divina	5,558	2.22	0					
Sergio Divina	5,558	2.22	0	Popular Alternative	2,261	0.97	0	New
Sergio Divina	5,558	2.22	0	Us with Divina for President	1,845	0.79	0	New
Sergio Divina	5,558	2.22	0	Youth for Divina	642	0.28	0	New
Sergio Divina	5,558	2.22	0	Total	4,748	2.04	0	—
Alex Marini	4,796	1.92	0	Five Star Movement	4,523	1.95	0	–1
Elena Dardo	1,205	0.48	0	Alternative	1,121	0.48	0	New
Total candidates	250,389	100	3	Total parties	232,513	100	32	±0
Source: Autonomous Province of Trento

=== Local government ===
Municipality	Inhabitants	Mayor	Party	Election
Trento	117,317	Franco Ianeselli	Independent (Democratic Party)	2025
Rovereto	39,289	Giulia Robol	Democratic Party	2024
Pergine Valsugana	21,280	Marco Morelli	Independent (Lega Trentino)	2025
Arco	17,526	Anna Fiorio	Independent (Green Europe)	2025
Riva del Garda	16,926	Alessio Zanoni	Democratic Party	2025

== Politics of South Tyrol ==
The politics of South Tyrol is conducted through a parliamentary, democratic autonomous province with a multi-party system. Executive power is exercised collectively by the Landesregierung, which is led by the Governor, referred to as "Landeshauptmann" in German. Legislative power is vested in the Landtag primarily, and secondarily on the provincial government. The judiciary is independent of the executive and the legislative branches. South Tyrol has been an autonomous province within the Italian Republic since 1948, when the Gruber – De Gasperi Agreement was agreed upon between Austria and Italy. The current Landeshauptmann is Arno Kompatscher.

=== Executive branch ===
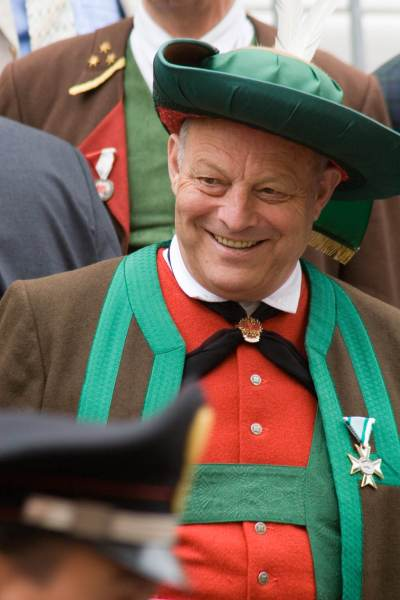
Luis Durnwalder was governor of South Tyrol from 1989 until 2014.

The local government system is based upon the provisions of the Italian Constitution and the Autonomy Statute of the Region Trentino-Alto Adige/Südtirol. The 1972 second Statute of Autonomy for Trentino-Alto Adige/Südtirol devolved most legislative and executive competences from the regional level to the provincial level, creating de facto two separate regions.

The executive powers are attributed to the provincial government (German: Landesregierung; Italian: Giunta Provinciale) headed by the Landeshauptmann Arno Kompatscher, who has been in power since 2014. He belongs to the South Tyrolean People's Party.

==== List of governors ====
Governors of South Tyrol
Governor	Portrait	Party	Term		Coalition	Legislature	Election
Karl Erckert (1894–1955)		SVP	20 December 1948	19 December 1952	SVP • DC • PSDI • UI (Note: Union of Independents.)	I Legislature	1948
Karl Erckert (1894–1955)		SVP	20 December 1952	15 December 1955 (Note: Died in office.)	SVP • DC	II Legislature	1952
Alois Pupp (1900–1969)		SVP	7 January 1956	14 December 1956	SVP • DC	II Legislature	1952
Alois Pupp (1900–1969)		SVP	15 December 1956	30 December 1960	SVP • DC	III Legislature	1956
Silvius Magnago (1914–2010)		SVP	31 December 1960	3 February 1965	SVP • DC	IV Legislature	1960
Silvius Magnago (1914–2010)		SVP	4 February 1965	16 February 1969	SVP • DC	V Legislature	1964
Silvius Magnago (1914–2010)		SVP	17 February 1969	14 May 1970	SVP • DC	VI Legislature	1968
Silvius Magnago (1914–2010)		SVP	15 May 1970	14 March 1974	SVP • DC • PSI	VI Legislature	1968
Silvius Magnago (1914–2010)		SVP	15 March 1974	10 April 1979	SVP • DC • PSI	VII Legislature	1973
Silvius Magnago (1914–2010)		SVP	11 April 1979	26 April 1984	SVP • DC • PSDI	VIII Legislature	1978
Silvius Magnago (1914–2010)		SVP	27 April 1984	16 March 1989	SVP • DC • PSI	IX Legislature	1983
Luis Durnwalder (b. 1941)		SVP	17 March 1989	10 February 1994	SVP • DC • PSI	X Legislature	1988
Luis Durnwalder (b. 1941)		SVP	11 February 1994	3 February 1999	SVP • PPI • PDS	XI Legislature	1993
Luis Durnwalder (b. 1941)		SVP	4 February 1999	17 December 2003	SVP • DS • PPI • UDAA	XII Legislature	1998
Luis Durnwalder (b. 1941)		SVP	18 December 2003	17 December 2008	SVP • DS • UDAA	XIII Legislature	2003
Luis Durnwalder (b. 1941)		SVP	18 December 2008	8 January 2014	SVP • PD	XIV Legislature	2008
Arno Kompatscher (b. 1971)		SVP	9 January 2014	16 January 2019	SVP • PD	XV Legislature	2013
Arno Kompatscher (b. 1971)		SVP	17 January 2019	17 January 2024	SVP • LAAST	XVI Legislature	2018
Arno Kompatscher (b. 1971)		SVP	18 January 2024	Incumbent	SVP • FdI • DF • LAAST (Note: In January LAAST's provincial minister Christian Bianchi switched to FI.) • LC (Note: External support.)	XVII Legislature	2023

=== Legislative branch ===
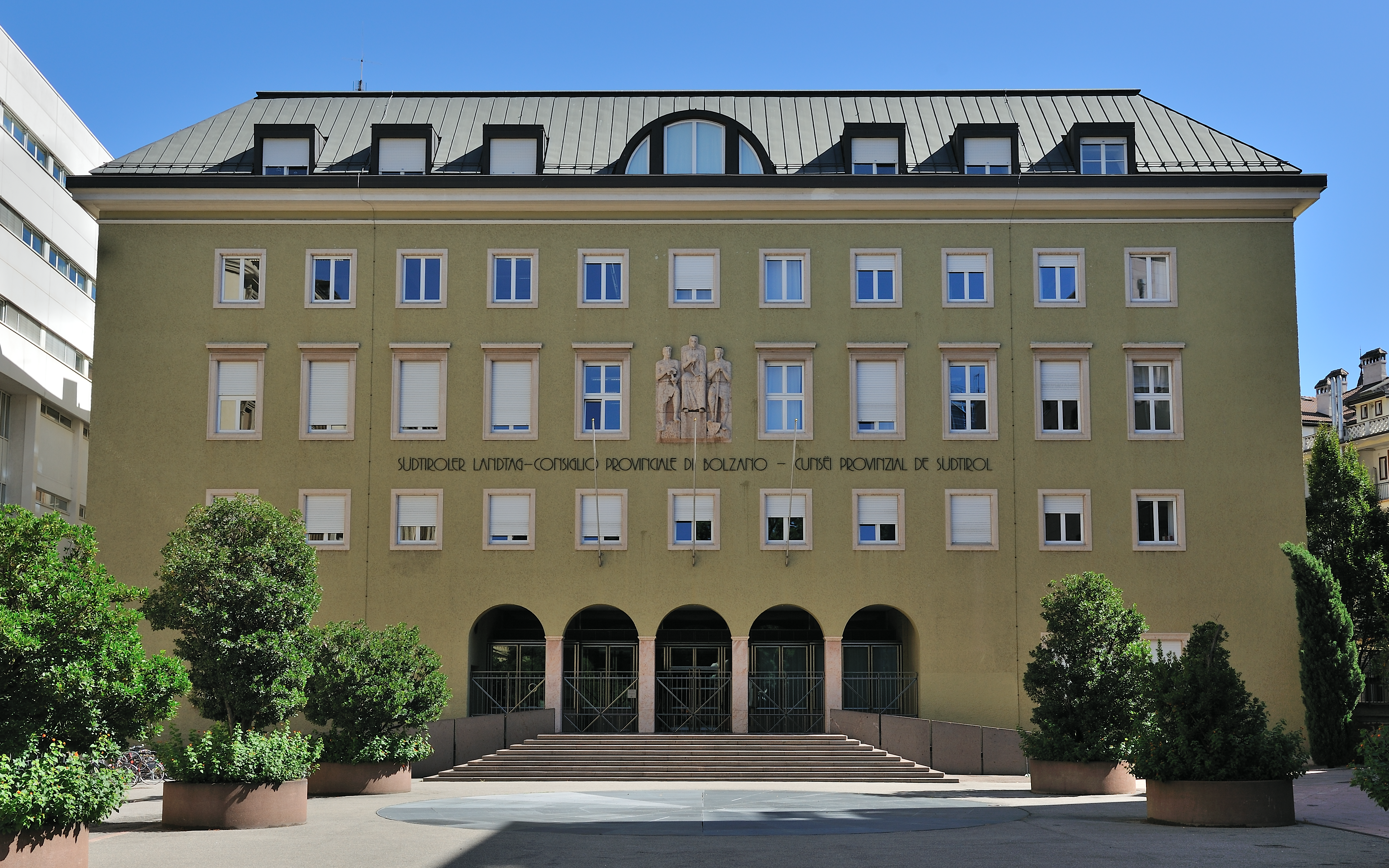
The provincial assembly building of South Tyrol.

The considerable legislative power of the province is vested in a provincial assembly called Landtag (German: Südtiroler Landtag; Italian: Consiglio della Provincia Autonoma di Bolzano; Ladin: Cunsëi dla Provinzia Autonoma de Bulsan). The legislative powers of the assembly cover all those subject matters that are not expressly reserved to the exclusive legislative power of the Italian State or to concurrent legislation per article 117 of the Italian Constitution.

==== Latest provincial election ====
Party	Votes	%	Seats	+/–
South Tyrolean People's Party	97,092	34.53	13	−2
Team K	31,201	11.09	4	−2
South Tyrolean Freedom	30,583	10.88	4	+2
Greens	25,445	9.05	3	±0
Brothers of Italy	16,747	5.96	2	+1
JWA List	16,596	5.90	2	New
Die Freiheitlichen	13,836	4.92	2	±0
Democratic Party	9,707	3.45	1	±0
For South Tyrol with Widmann	9,646	3.43	1	±0
League–United for Alto Adige	8,541	3.04	1	−3
La Civica	7,301	2.60	1	New
Vita	7,222	2.57	1	New
Five Star Movement	2,086	0.74	–	−1
Enzian	1,990	0.71	–	New
Forza Italia	1,625	0.58	–	±0
Centre-Right	1,601	0.57	–	New
Total	281,219	100.00	35	–
Valid votes	281,219	96.87		
Invalid/blank votes	9,080	3.13		
Total votes	290,299	100.00		
Registered voters/turnout	429,841	67.54		
Source: Official Results

Popular vote
SVP	34.53%
TK	11.09%
STF	10.88%
Grüne	9.05%
FdI	5.96%
JWA	5.90%
dF	4.92%
PD	3.45%
Widmann	3.43%
Lega	3.04%
Civica	2.60%
Vita	2.57%
M5S	0.74%
Enzian	0.71%
FI	0.58%
CD	0.57%

=== Local government ===
Municipality	Inhabitants	Mayor	Party	Election
Bolzano	106,441	Claudio Corrarati	Independent (Brothers of Italy)	2025
Merano	39,462	Katharina Zeller	South Tyrolean People's Party	2025
Brixen	21,535	Andreas Jungmann	South Tyrolean People's Party	2024
Laives	17,700	Giovanni Seppi	South Tyrolean People's Party	2024
Bruneck	16,109	Bruno Wolf	South Tyrolean People's Party	2025

=== Autonomy and separatism ===
The Südtiroler Heimatbund asked the Soffi-Institute in Innsbruck to conduct an opinion poll on the future of South Tyrol. The poll was conducted at the end of 2005 in which only German-speaking South Tyroleans were asked. 45.33% of those asked were in favour of remaining with Italy, 54.67% were against remaining. The latter group comprised 33.40% in favour of an independent state and 21.27% in favour of Tyrolean reunification with Austria.

Another poll conducted in August 2008 by the apollis Institute of Social Research and Opinion Polling in Bolzano asked 502 Italian-speaking South Tyroleans of their opinion. The poll consisted of three parts. To the first question if a referendum about remaining with Italy should be held at all, 41% said yes and 59% no. In the event of a referendum, 78% wished to remain with Italy, 20% were in favour of an independent state and 2% in favour of Tyrolean reunification with Austria.

A poll conducted in 2013 among German and Ladin speakers by the Austrian Kasmarin agency showed the following results: To the question "If a referendum were conducted also in South Tyrol and you had a choice, how would you decide?", 26% would opt for staying within Italy, and 54% for independence from Italy.

Across the border in the Austrian state of Tyrol, the Tiroler Tageszeitung conducted a poll in January 2009 to gauge the opinion of the inhabitants of North and East Tyrol. 500 people were asked in the poll. In 2008, 45% wished a reunification with South Tyrol, that number increased in 2009 by 4% to 49% in favour. 36.6% were against reunification while 14.1% had no opinion. In the age group of 15- to 29-year-olds, 71% were in favour of reunification. The highest support by district was in the Oberland with 67% while Innsbruck city and district was lowest with 42%.

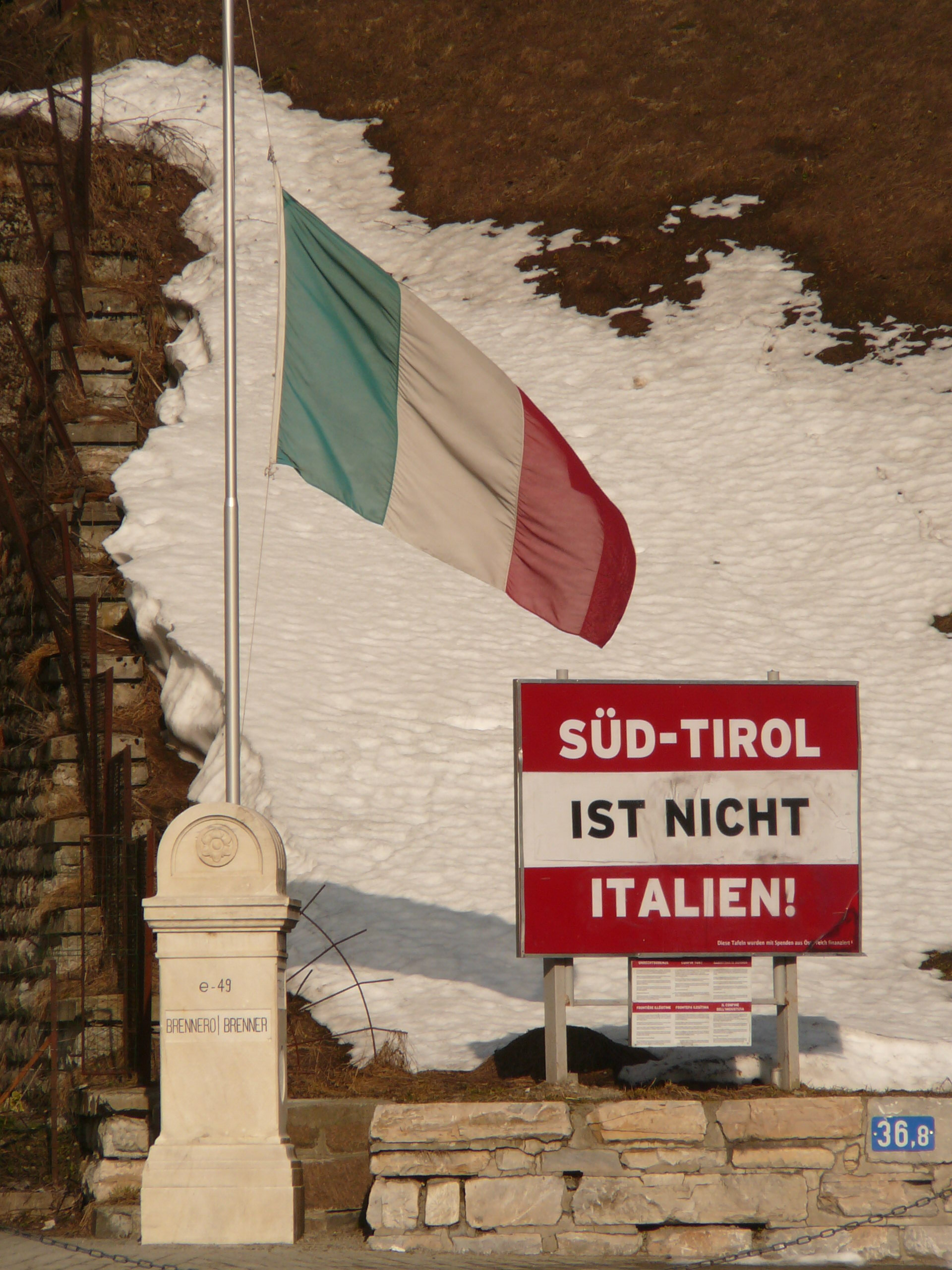
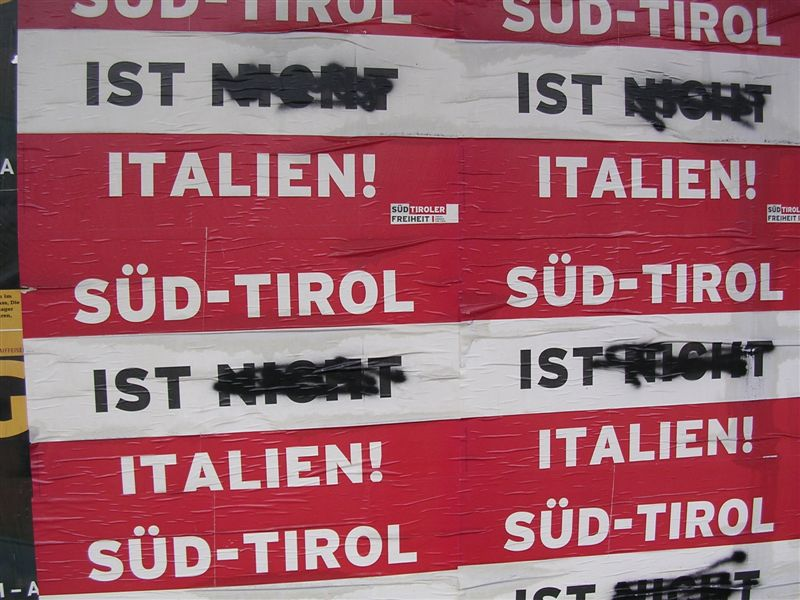
On the left, a signpost placed by the right-wing party South Tyrolean Freedom at the Austro-Italian border (Austrian side) proclaiming "Süd-Tirol ist nicht Italien!" ("South Tyrol is not Italy!). On the right, a similar poster in Merano has been bedaubed, to cancel the word "not".

The independence controversy has been an issue especially of German-speaking right-wing parties: South Tyrolean Freedom, JWA List, Die Freiheitlichen and Citizens' Union for South Tyrol. With the 2008 Kosovo declaration of independence, the idea of a Freistaat (free state) resurfaced again. Especially, South Tyrolean Freedom and her founding leader Eva Klotz, with the campaign South Tyrol is not Italy!, have been among the strongest advocates of self-determination.

== Sources and further reading ==
- Trentino Alto-Adige Region – Elections
- Provincial Council of Trento – Legislatures
- Provincial Council of Bolzano – Legislatures
- Provincial Government of Trento – Elections
- Provincial Government of Bolzano – Elections
- Cattaneo Institute – Archive of Election Data
- Parties and Elections in Europe – Province of Trento
- Parties and Elections in Europe – Province of Bolzano
- Ministry of the Interior – Historical Archive of Elections
- "Political parties in Alto Adige from 1945 to 2005", an essay by Gunther Pallaver
- Marc Röggla. 2019. "Consensus Impossible? South Tyrol’s Autonomy Convention and the issue of Self-determination." Journal of Autonomy and Security Studies
