= List of presidents of Trentino-Alto Adige/Südtirol =

This is the list of presidents of Trentino-Alto Adige/Südtirol since 1948.

Since 1999, the presidency of the regional government has been rotational, between one provincincial councillor from Trentino and another from South Tyrol, for two years and a half each in each legislature (parliamentary term). Since 2004, these have been the president of Trentino and the governor of South Tyrol.

Presidents of Trentino-Alto Adige/Südtirol
President	Party	Term	Legislature
Tullio Odorizzi	DC	1948–1953	I Legislature
Tullio Odorizzi	DC	1953–1957	II Legislature
Tullio Odorizzi	DC	1957–1961	III Legislature
Luigi Dalvit	DC	1961–1965	IV Legislature
Luigi Dalvit	DC	1965–1967	V Legislature
Giorgio Grigolli	DC	1967–1969	V Legislature
Giorgio Grigolli	DC	1969–1973	VI Legislature
Bruno Kessler	DC	1974–1976	VII Legislature
Flavio Mengoni	DC	1976–1977	VII Legislature
Spartaco Marziani	DC	1977–1979	VII Legislature
Enrico Pancheri	DC	1979–1984	VIII Legislature
Pierluigi Angeli	DC	1984–1987	IX Legislature
Gianni Bazzanella	DC	1987–1989	IX Legislature
Gianni Bazzanella	DC	1989–1992	X Legislature
Tarcisio Andreolli	DC	1992–1994	X Legislature
Tarcisio Grandi	PPI	1994–1999	XI Legislature
Margherita Cogo	DS	1999–2002	XII Legislature
Carlo Andreotti	PATT	2002–2004	XII Legislature
Luis Durnwalder	SVP	2004–2006	XIII Legislature
Lorenzo Dellai	Civica	2006–2008	XIII Legislature
Luis Durnwalder	SVP	2008–2011	XIV Legislature
Lorenzo Dellai	UpT	2011–2013	XIV Legislature
Alberto Pacher	PD	2013–2014	XIV Legislature
Ugo Rossi	PATT	2014–2016	XV Legislature
Arno Kompatscher	SVP	2016–2018	XV Legislature
Arno Kompatscher	SVP	2018–2021	XVI Legislature
Maurizio Fugatti	LT	2021–2024	XVI Legislature
Arno Kompatscher	SVP	2024–present	XVII Legislature

== See also ==
- Politics of Trentino-Alto Adige/Südtirol
