= List of presidents of Trentino =

This is the list of presidents of Trentino (Italian: Presidente, German: Landeshauptmann) since 1948.

== List ==
President		Term of office		Party	Administration	Coalition	Legislature
President		Duration in years, months and days		Party	Administration	Coalition	Legislature
1	Giuseppe Balista (1901–1977)	20 December 1948	19 December 1952	DC	Balista I	DC	I (1948)
1	Giuseppe Balista (1901–1977)	4 years		DC	Balista II	DC	I (1948)
2	Remo Albertini (1920–2005)	19 December 1952	14 December 1956	DC	Albertini	DC	II (1952)
2	Remo Albertini (1920–2005)	3 years, 11 months and 26 days		DC	Albertini	DC	II (1952)
3	Riccardo Rosa (1902–1970)	14 December 1956	30 December 1960	DC	Rosa	DC	III (1956)
3	Riccardo Rosa (1902–1970)	4 years and 17 days		DC	Rosa	DC	III (1956)
4	Bruno Kessler (1924–1991)	30 December 1960	13 March 1974	DC	Kessler I	DC	IV (1960)
4	Bruno Kessler (1924–1991)	30 December 1960	13 March 1974	DC	Kessler II	DC • PSI	V (1964)
4	Bruno Kessler (1924–1991)	13 years, 2 months and 14 days		DC	Kessler III	DC	VI (1968)
5	Giorgio Grigolli (1927–2016)	13 March 1974	15 March 1979	DC	Grigolli I	DC • PSDI • PRI	VII (1973)
5	Giorgio Grigolli (1927–2016)	5 years and 3 days		DC	Grigolli II	DC	VII (1973)
6	Flavio Mengoni (1929–2013)	15 March 1979	30 October 1985	DC	Mengoni I	DC • PRI	VIII (1978)
6	Flavio Mengoni (1929–2013)	15 March 1979	30 October 1985	DC	Mengoni II	DC • PRI	VIII (1978)
6	Flavio Mengoni (1929–2013)	15 March 1979	30 October 1985	DC	Mengoni III	DC • PSDI • PLI	VIII (1978)
6	Flavio Mengoni (1929–2013)	15 March 1979	30 October 1985	DC	Mengoni IV	DC • PSDI • PLI	VIII (1978)
6	Flavio Mengoni (1929–2013)	6 years, 7 months and 16 days		DC	Mengoni V	DC • PRI • PLI	IX (1983)
7	Pierluigi Angeli (born 1938)	30 October 1985	16 February 1989	DC	Angeli	DC • PSI • PRI	IX (1983)
7	Pierluigi Angeli (born 1938)	3 years, 3 months and 18 days		DC	Angeli	DC • PSI • PRI	IX (1983)
8	Mario Malossini (born 1947)	16 February 1989	4 June 1992	DC	Malossini	DC • PSI	X (1988)
8	Mario Malossini (born 1947)	3 years, 3 months and 20 days		DC	Malossini	DC • PSI	X (1988)
9	Gianni Bazzanella (born 1940)	4 June 1992	4 March 1994	DC	Bazzanella	DC • PSI • PSDI	X (1988)
9	Gianni Bazzanella (born 1940)	1 year, 9 months and 1 day		DC	Bazzanella	DC • PSI • PSDI	X (1988)
10	Carlo Andreotti (born 1943)	4 March 1994	24 February 1999	PATT	Andreotti	PATT • PRI • PSDI	XI (1993)
10	Carlo Andreotti (born 1943)	4 years, 11 months and 21 days		PATT	Andreotti	PATT • PRI • PSDI	XI (1993)
11	Lorenzo Dellai (born 1959)	24 February 1999	29 December 2012	DL	Dellai I	The Olive Tree (DL • DS • FdV)	XII (1998)
11	Lorenzo Dellai (born 1959)	24 February 1999	29 December 2012	DL	Dellai II	The Olive Tree (DL • DS)	XIII (2003)
11	Lorenzo Dellai (born 1959)	24 February 1999	29 December 2012	UpT	Dellai III	PD • UpT • PATT	XIV (2008)
11	Lorenzo Dellai (born 1959)	13 years, 10 months and 6 days		UpT	Dellai III	PD • UpT • PATT	XIV (2008)
-	Alberto Pacher (born 1956)	29 December 2012	9 November 2013	PD	Pacher	PD • UpT • PATT	XIV (2008)
-	Alberto Pacher (born 1956)	10 months and 12 days		PD	Pacher	PD • UpT • PATT	XIV (2008)
12	Ugo Rossi (born 1963)	9 November 2013	2 November 2018	PATT	Rossi	PD • UpT • PATT	XV (2013)
12	Ugo Rossi (born 1963)	4 years, 11 months and 25 days		PATT	Rossi	PD • UpT • PATT	XV (2013)
13	Maurizio Fugatti (born 1972)	2 November 2018	Incumbent	LT	Fugatti I	LT • FI • CT	XVI (2018)
13	Maurizio Fugatti (born 1972)	7 years, 8 months and 11 days		LT	Fugatti II	LT • FdI • PATT	XVII (2023)
