= Giambattista Lenzi =

Italian politician (1951–2009)

Member of the Regional Council of Trentino-Alto Adige
- In office 2003 – 1 June 2009

President of Bassa Valsugana e Tesino District
- In office 1996–2003

Mayor of Samone
- In office 1985–?

Councillor in Samone
- In office 1980–?

Personal details
- Born: 13 April 1951 Samone, Trentino
- Died: 1 June 2009 (aged 57) Atlantic Ocean aboard Air France Flight 447
- Party: Daisy Civic List (2003-2008); Union for Trentino (2008-2009)
- Spouse: Maria Grazia (until 2009; his death)
- Children: 2

Giovanni Battista Lenzi (13 April 1951 – 1 June 2009) was an Italian politician who was a member of the Regional Council of Trentino-Alto Adige from 2003 until his death aboard Air France Flight 447 in 2009. He was a member of the thirteenth and fourteenth councils.

== Biography ==
Giovanni Battista Lenzi was born in 1951 in Samone, Trentino, where he became a councillor in 1980 and later became the mayor in 1985 He was the district president of Bassa Valsugana e Tesino from 1996 until 2003.

He was a provincial board member of the Italian Confederation of Workers' Trade Unions and was also the Cassa Rurale president of his native Samone from 1979 until 2003. His contributions included agricultural management and the formation of an Alcide De Gasperi museum.

In the thirteenth council, which lasted from 2003 until 2008, Lenzi was one of thirteen members of the Daisy Civic List parliamentary group. He was the secretary of the fifth commission with Guido Ghirardini as president and Agostino Catalano as vice-president. In the fourteenth council, which lasted from 2008 until 2013, Lenzi was one of seven members of the Union for Trentino parliamentary group. He was the president of the first commission with Rodolfo Borga as vice-president and Bruno Firmani as secretary.

Lenzi was on Air France Flight 447 returning home from visiting Italian Brazilian people alongside Rino Zandonai and Mayor of Canal San Bovo Luigi Zortea when it crashed into the Atlantic Ocean en route from Rio de Janeiro to Paris. All 228 people were killed, including Lenzi himself; his body was recovered in December 2011. He was succeeded as a councillor by Gianfranco Zanon of the Mixed Group parliamentary group, while Renzo Anderle succeeded him in his parliamentary commission position. He was 57 at the time of his death.

He had two daughters with his wife Maria Grazia.
