= Campobase =

- Leader: Francesco Valduga
- Secretary: Chiara Maule
- President: Paolo Piccoli
- Founded: 12 February 2022
- Preceded by: Union for Trentino
- Headquarters: Vicolo dell'Adige 9, Trento
- Ideology: Regionalism; Christian democracy
- Political position: Centre
- National affiliation: Centre-left coalition
- Colours: Green
- Chamber of Deputies: 0 / 400
- Senate: 1 / 205
- European Parliament: 0 / 76
- Provincial council: 4 / 35

Website
- campobasetrentino.it

Campobase (lit. 'Base camp') is a regionalist and centrist political party, in the Christian-democratic tradition, in Trentino, Italy. Its informal leader is Lorenzo Dellai, a former three-term president of Trentino (1999–2012). The party is the heir of the Daisy Civic List (1998–2008) and the Union for Trentino (2008–2022), and is part of the centre-left coalition both in Trentino and the Italian Parliament.

== History ==
After the defeat of the centre-left and the Union for Trentino (UpT) especially in the 2018 provincial election, the idea of a new party unifying the UpT, local civic lists and individual centrists floated for years, until the proposal of a "Campobase" was conceived by Lorenzo Dellai in November 2021.

Campobase was launched in February 2022, under the leadership of coordinator Michael Rech (mayor of Folgaria) and Chiara Maule (vice president of the UpT). Other than Dellai, leading members of the founding committee included Annalisa Caumo (president of the UpT), Marcello Carli (former member of the provincial council of Trentino), Francesco Valduga (mayor of Rovereto) and Roberto Oss Emer (mayor of Pergine Valsugana).

In the 2022 general election, an independent close to Campobase, Pietro Patton, was elected senator in the single-seat constituency of Trento at the head of a broad centre-left coalition. Consequently, the For the Autonomies group took also the "Campobase" sub-name.

In March 2023, during an assembly, Campobase became a full-fledged political party. Rech was elected secretary, Maule deputy secretary, Paolo Piccoli (president of Trento's municipal council) president and Elisa Bortolamedi vice president. Most importantly, the party launched Valduga for president of Trentino in the 2023 provincial election. In April Valduga became the official candidate of the centre-left.

In the election, Valduga was defeated by incumbent president Maurizio Fugatti of Lega Trentino (51.8% to 37.5%). However, Campobase was the second largest party of the centre-left coalition: 8.4% of the vote and three councillors (Chiara Maule, Roberto Stanchina and Michele Malfer).

In December 2024 the party held its second congress and Maule was elected secretary.

== Electoral results ==
=== Italian Parliament ===
Senate of the Republic
Election	Votes	%	Seats	+/−	Candidate	Ref.
2022	48,021 (Note: In a joint list with +E – AVS – PD–IDP – A–IV.)	41.20	1 / 3	New	Pietro Patton	

=== Provincial Council of Trentino ===
Election	Leader	Votes	%	Seats	+/–
2023	Francesco Valduga	19,553	8.41	4 / 35	New

== Leadership ==
- Coordinator/Secretary: Michael Rech (2022–2024), Chiara Maule (2024–present)
  - Deputy Coordinator/Secretary: Chiara Maule (2022–2024), Alberto Frisanco (2025–present)
- President: Paolo Piccoli (2023–present)
  - Vice President: Elisa Bortolamedi (2023–2024), Anastasia Facchinelli (2025–present)
