= Beniamino Andreatta =

Italian politician and economist (1928–2007)

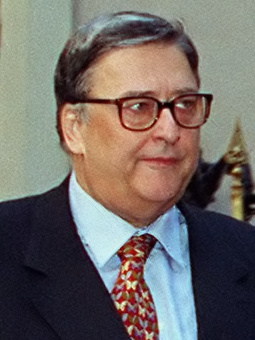
- Andreatta in 1997

Minister of Defence
- In office 18 May 1996 – 21 October 1998
- Prime Minister: Romano Prodi
- Preceded by: Domenico Corcione
- Succeeded by: Carlo Scognamiglio Pasini

Minister of Foreign Affairs
- In office 28 April 1993 – 19 April 1994
- Prime Minister: Carlo Azeglio Ciampi
- Preceded by: Emilio Colombo
- Succeeded by: Leopoldo Elia

Minister of the Treasury
- In office 18 October 1980 – 1 December 1982
- Prime Minister: Arnaldo Forlani; Giovanni Spadolini
- Preceded by: Filippo Maria Pandolfi
- Succeeded by: Giovanni Goria

Minister of Budget
- In office 4 August 1979 – 4 April 1980
- Prime Minister: Francesco Cossiga
- Preceded by: Bruno Visentini
- Succeeded by: Giorgio La Malfa
Parliamentary offices
Member of the Chamber of Deputies
In office 15 April 1994 – 29 May 2001
Constituency	Friuli-Venezia Giulia (1994–1996); Rimini (1996–2001)
In office 12 July 1983 – 2 July 1987
Constituency	Bologna
Member of the Senate of the Republic
In office 2 July 1987 – 22 April 1992
Constituency	Emilia-Romagna
In office 5 July 1976 – 11 July 1983
Constituency	Emilia-Romagna

Personal details
- Born: 11 August 1928 Trento, Italy
- Died: 26 March 2007 (aged 78) Bologna, Italy
- Party: DC (until 1994); PPI (1994–1999)
- Height: 1.76 m (5 ft 9 in)
- Education: University of Padua
- Profession: Politician, economist

Beniamino "Nino" Andreatta (11 August 1928 – 26 March 2007) was an Italian economist and politician. He was a member of Christian Democracy, and one of the founders of the Italian People's Party in 1994 and of the Olive Tree centre-left coalition in 1996.

== Early life and career ==
At the Liceo Classico Giovanni Prati di Trento was a school friend of Giorgio Grigolli, later President of the Autonomous Province of Trento.

After graduating in law from University of Padua in 1950, receiving the award for "best graduate of the year", he later completed his studies in economics at the Università Cattolica del Sacro Cuore of Milan, and as a visiting scholar at Cambridge.

In 1961, after his marriage to his wife Giana, he went to India on behalf of MIT, as a consultant to the Planning Commission of the government of Jawaharlal Nehru.

The following year he became a full professor. During his academic career he taught at the Catholic University of Milan as a volunteer assistant, and at the Universities of Urbino, Trento (in 1968, during the student protests) and Bologna. In Bologna founded the Institute of Economics and the Faculty of Political Sciences. Among his students and collaborators many brilliant economists, including Romano Prodi that from 1963 became his assistant.

He had a long association with Bruno Kessler, president of the Province of Trento from 1960 to 1974, on the topic of autonomy.

In 1972 he was among the founders, with Paolo Sylos Labini, of the University of Calabria in Rende (province of Cosenza), a campus on the Anglo-Saxon model to stimulate the growth of the South.

In 1974 Andreatta founded in Bologna "Prometeia", an association to analyze the Italian economy, followed in 1976 by Agenzia di Ricerche e Legislazione» di Roma (Arel), with Ferrante Pierantoni, and others, a cross-party group of intellectuals, politicians and entrepreneurs dedicated to the debate on political and economic issues.

== Entry into politics and experience ==
Thanks to the results achieved in the academia, in the 1960s he became economic adviser to Aldo Moro, coming into contact with the group of economists, including Giuliano Amato, Francesco Forte, Siro Lombardini, Giorgio Ruffolo, Franco Momigliano and Alessandro Pizzorno, who then gravitated around the Socialist deputy Antonio Giolitti.

The proximity to Aldo Moro favored his political rise within the Christian Democrats, and from 1976 to 1992 was a member of Parliament for the Christian Democrats (DC).

He held several ministerial posts: in 1979 he was Minister of the Budget and Economic Planning in the first government of Francesco Cossiga and without portfolio "special assignment" in the second government led by Cossiga (August 1979 - October 1980).

He was Treasury Secretary from October 1980 to December 1982 in the government of Arnaldo Forlani and the two governments of Giovanni Spadolini. In July 1982 a quarrel with the socialist Minister of Finance Rino Formica brought down the Spadolini government. He did not participate in the following governments of Bettino Craxi and Giulio Andreotti, especially since he was skeptical of the economic policies that these adopted.

His stay at the Treasury coincided with some of the most critical years in the history of contemporary Italy. Andreatta sanctioned the separation of the Bank of Italy by the Italian Ministry of the Treasury, and when in 1981 the P2 the scandal was revealed, he was adamant in removing officials and managers who appeared in the list seized from Licio Gelli. With the onset of the scandal of the IOR of Roberto Calvi and Paul Marcinkus, Andreatta imposed the dissolution of the Banco Ambrosiano, ignoring political and media pressures. Andreatta himself held a historic speech in Parliament publicly reporting responsibilities of the Vatican bank and its leaders. In the eighties, he was also chairman of the Senate Budget Committee.

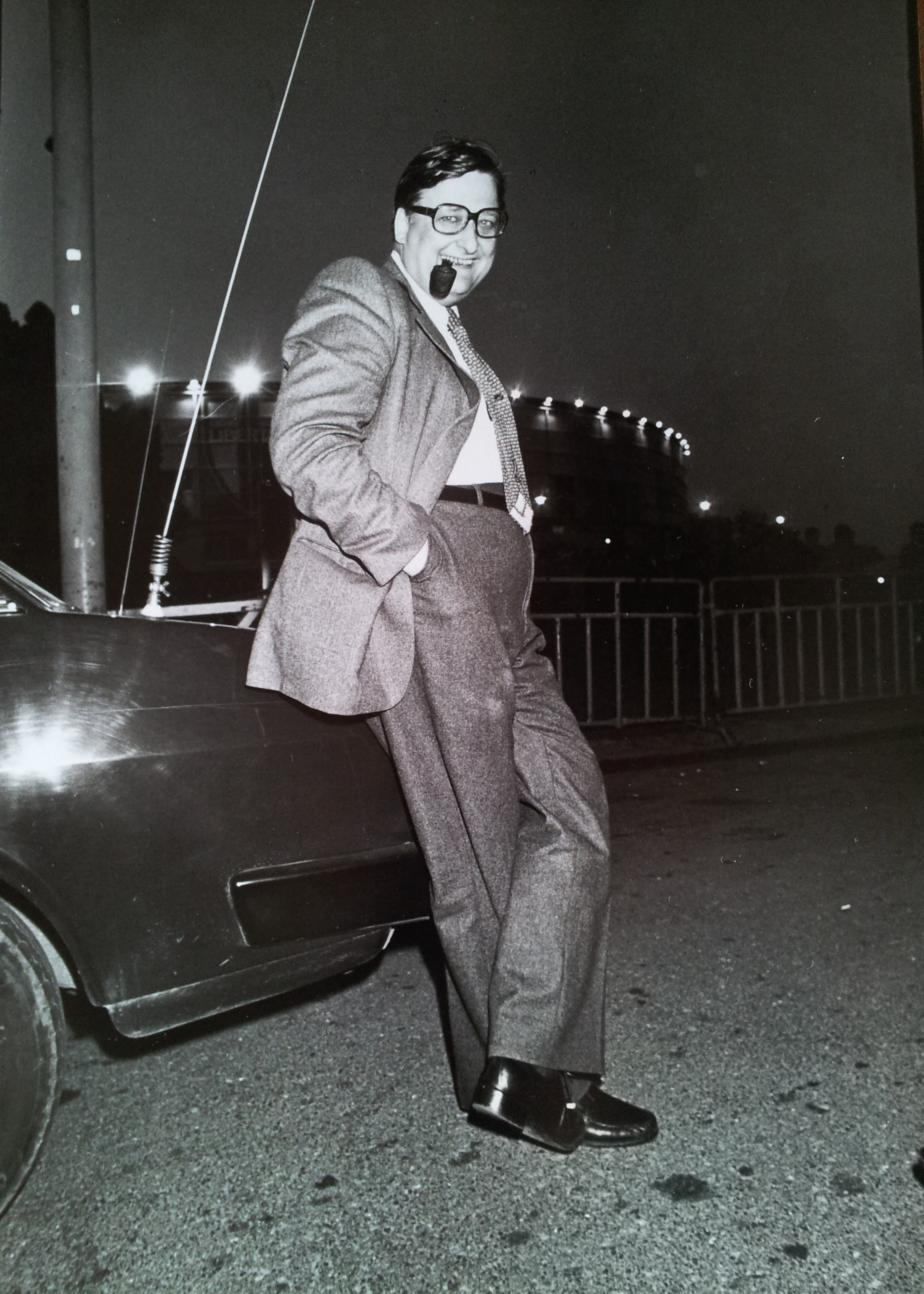
Andreatta in the late 1970s

He was vice president of the European People's Party from 1984 to 1987, and was close to Helmut Kohl and his Christian Democratic Union.

== Second Republic and Italian Popular Party ==
He returned to power in 1992, in the wake of the scandal of Tangentopoli who had alienated many politicians, as Minister of the Budget with the interim of the Cassa per il Mezzogiorno in the first government of Giuliano Amato, He was then foreign minister in the government of Carlo Azeglio Ciampi from April 1993 to March 1994, and in this role he advanced a proposal for reform of the UN.

With the Second Republic Andreatta became leader in the Chamber of Deputies of the People's Party, becoming a leader of the former Christian Democrats siding with the Progressives against the Berlusconi government.

He was one of the main proponents and supporters of the birth of the Olive Tree coalition.

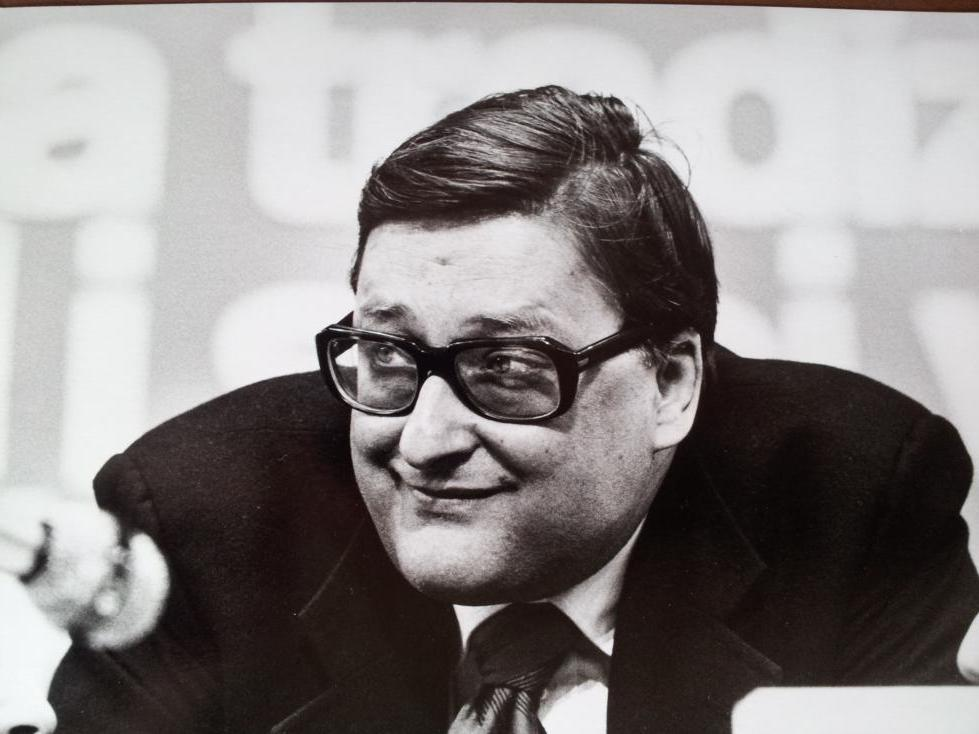
Andreatta during the 1980s

== Creating the Ulivo and Minister of Defence ==
Andreatta was throughout his career a promoter of a mixed economic system and between the pupils of his main school of thought the most important was Romano Prodi, which he sponsored as a guide for the center-left coalition after the fall of the first Berlusconi government in 1995.

Prodi nominated him as defence minister in his first government (May 1996 - October 1998 ), where Andreatta made a number of significant proposals: the reform of the General Staff, the 'abolition of conscription, the reform of the civil service. He launched Operazione Alba (a peacekeeping and humanitarian aid mission to Albania entirely managed by European forces) and proposed ideas to build and organize a European defence forces.

After the fall of the Prodi government in 1998, he founded "Charter 14 June", an association which aimed to broaden the basis of democratic consensus and to reduce the power of parties. During the election campaign for the European elections of 1999, he supported an alliance between the PPI and the Democrats.

== Death ==
On 15 December 1999, during a parliamentary session for the vote of the budget, he had a serious heart attack and ended up in a coma. Andreatta suffered from cerebral hypoxia for twenty minutes, incurring permanent damage.

On 1 January 2000 he was transferred on board of a military transport from St. James to St. Orsola-Malpighi Hospital of Bologna.

Andreatta until his death never regained consciousness, dying after more than seven years on 26 March 2007 in the intensive care unit of the Policlinico S. Orsola Bologna.

Andreatta's son Filippo, professor at the University of Bologna, writes for several Italian newspapers and has been a supporter of the Democratic Party, an idea also pursued by his father in his last years. His daughter Eleonora, nicknamed Tinny, was a senior executive at Rai and, in 2012, was appointed the director of Rai Fiction, a position she held until 2020. She later became an executive at Netflix.

== Electoral history ==
Election	House	Constituency	Party	Votes	Result
1976	Senate of the Republic	Emilia-Romagna – Fiorenzuola d'Arda-Fidenza	DC	38,218	Elected
1979	Senate of the Republic	Emilia-Romagna – Fiorenzuola d'Arda-Fidenza	DC	36,741	Elected
1983	Chamber of Deputies	Bologna–Ferrara–Ravenna–Forlì	DC	42,230	Elected
1987	Senate of the Republic	Emilia-Romagna – Castelnovo ne' Monti-Sassuolo	DC	41,484	Elected
1992	Senate of the Republic	Trentino Alto Adige – Trento	DC	45,027	Not elected
1994	Chamber of Deputies	Friuli-Venezia Giulia	PPI	– (Note: Elected in a closed list proportional representation system.)	Elected
1996	Chamber of Deputies	Rimini-Sant'Arcangelo di Romagna	PPI	53,607	Elected

Source: Ministry of the Interior

== See also ==
- Banca di Trento e Bolzano

== Bibliography ==
- N. Andreatta, Per un'Italia moderna. Questioni di politica e di economia, Il Mulino, Bologna 2002.

Political offices
Preceded by Bruno Visentini	Minister of Budget; 1979–1980	Succeeded by Giorgio La Malfa
Preceded by Filippo Maria Pandolfi	Minister of Treasury; 1980–1982	Succeeded by Giovanni Goria
Preceded by Emilio Colombo	Minister of Foreign Affairs; 1993–1994	Succeeded by Leopoldo Elia; Acting
Preceded by Domenico Corcione	Minister of Defence; 1996–1998	Succeeded by Carlo Scognamiglio
