= Landeshauptmann =

Germanophone government title

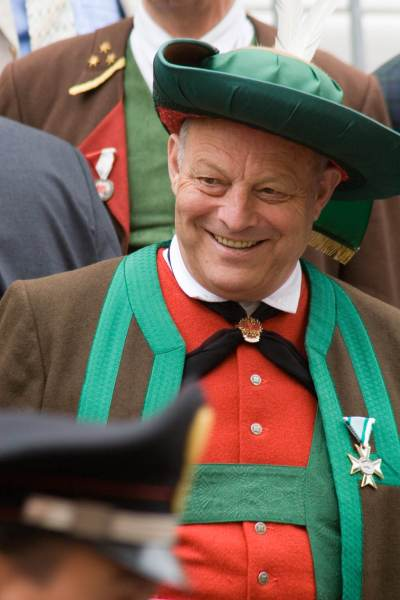
Luis Durnwalder, Landeshauptmann of South Tyrol from 1989 to 2014, wearing traditional clothing

The Landeshauptmann (if male) or Landeshauptfrau (if female) (German: [ˈlandəsˌhaʊptman], "state captain", plural Landeshauptleute, [ˈlandəsˌhaʊ̯ptlɔɪ̯tə]) is the chairman of a state government and the supreme official of an Austrian state and the Italian autonomous provinces of South Tyrol and Trentino. Their function is equivalent to that of a minister-president or premier. Until 1933 the term was also used in Prussia for the head of government of a province, in the modern-day states of Germany (with the exceptions of the city-states) the counterpart to Landeshauptmann is the Ministerpräsident (minister-president).

== Origins ==
Since the early modern period, a Landeshauptmann originally served as governor under either a Prince of the Holy Roman Empire or the Emperor himself, mainly in the territories of the Habsburg monarchy (as for the Lands of the Bohemian Crown), later also in the Kingdom of Prussia. In the Austrian Empire, according to the 1861 February Patent, the title referred to the president of the Landtag assembly of a Habsburg crown land (called Landmarschall in Lower Austria, Bohemia, and Galicia), who also served as head of the provincial administration. The Imperial-Royal government in Vienna was represented by a Statthalter or Landespräsident (governor).

With the dissolution of Austria-Hungary and the proclamation of the Republic of German-Austria in 1918, provisional state assemblies and state governments were established, headed by a Landeshauptmann. The 1920 constitution of the First Austrian Republic (Bundes-Verfassungsgesetz) unified the office of a Federal Government representative and head of the state government. The title is today used in modern Austria as well as in South Tyrol and Trentino, autonomous provinces in Italy with strong linguistic and cultural ties to the neighbouring Austrian state of Tyrol. In the Czech Republic, a hejtman (German: Hauptmann) represents each of the 13 self-governing regions (Czech kraj, pl. kraje).

== German Empire ==
The title was also used by the German Empire for governors during the early stages of its colonial rule over German South-West Africa (1893–1898), Togoland (1893–1898) and German New Guinea (1886–1889, 1892–1899).

== Austria ==
In modern Austria, the title is used for the head of the executive of the nine Austrian states, equivalent to the position of a Ministerpräsident in German states. In English speaking countries, the title is usually translated as "governor," though as mentioned above the function corresponds more to that of minister-president or premier.

The Landeshauptmann is elected by the Landtag (state parliament) of the respective state and sworn in by the President of Austria. In practice, the landeshauptmann is almost always the leader of the majority party in the Landtag, or the leader of the senior partner in the governing coalition. As representative of the federal government on state level, the landeshauptmann is also responsible for the enforcement of federal laws. Unlike in the federal government, there is no distinction between the head of state and head of government and the landeshauptmann serves both roles.

As Vienna is both a city and a state, its mayor is also the Landeshauptmann of the state, elected by the municipal and state assembly (Wiener Gemeinderat und Landtag). When Waltraud Klasnic (ÖVP) became governor of Styria in 1996, she preferred to be addressed as Frau Landeshauptmann, whereas Gabi Burgstaller (SPÖ), governor of Salzburg from 2004 to 2013, preferred Frau Landeshauptfrau. Since 1 July 1988, the Constitution of Austria allows for, but does not prescribe, office designations to be gender-specific.

=== List of governors ===
Portrait	Name	State of Austria	Took office	Federal political affiliation	State political affiliation
	Michael Ludwig	Vienna; See also: List of mayors of Vienna	24 May 2018	Social Democratic Party of Austria	SPÖ Wien
	Johanna Mikl-Leitner	Lower Austria; See also: List of governors of Lower Austria	19 April 2017	Austrian People's Party	Volkspartei Niederösterreich
	Karoline Edtstadler	(Salzburg (state)) Salzburg; See also: List of governors of Salzburg (state)	2 July 2025	Austrian People's Party	Salzburger Volkspartei
	Anton Mattle	(Tyrol (federal state)) Tyrol; See also: List of governors of Tyrol	25 October 2022	Austrian People's Party	Tiroler Volkspartei
	Hans Peter Doskozil	Burgenland; See also: List of governors of Burgenland	28 February 2019	Social Democratic Party of Austria	SPÖ Burgenland
	Thomas Stelzer	Upper Austria; See also: List of governors of Upper Austria	6 April 2017	Austrian People's Party	Oberösterreichische Volkspartei
	Daniel Fellner	Carinthia; See also: List of governors of Carinthia	7 April 2026	Social Democratic Party of Austria	SPÖ Kärnten
	Markus Wallner	Vorarlberg; See also: List of governors of Vorarlberg	7 December 2011	Austrian People's Party	Volkspartei Vorarlberg
	Mario Kunasek	Styria; See also: List of governors of Styria	18 December 2024	Freedom Party of Austria	FPÖ Styria

== South Tyrol and Trentino ==
According to the 1946 Gruber–De Gasperi Agreement and the Second Autonomy Statute of 1972, the chief executives of the provincial governments (Italian: Presidente della Provincia autonoma) of South Tyrol and Trentino are called Landeshauptleute in German.

The head of government of South Tyrol is elected by the provincial Landtag legislature. The Landeshauptmann represents the province to the outside and in meetings of the regions with the Italian government. He is also entitled to attend the sessions of the Council of Ministers as far as South Tyrolean issues are discussed. Their two deputies have to represent the Italian and German language group.

Despite the German terms Landeshauptmann and Landtag, South Tyrol and Trentino according to Italian conception are no federated states (Länder) but merely subnational administrative divisions (enti territoriali), though with considerable self-government responsibilities and legislative powers.

Portrait	Name	Region	Took office	Political party
	Arno Kompatscher	South Tyrol; See also: List of governors of South Tyrol	9 January 2014	South Tyrolean People's Party
	Maurizio Fugatti	Trentino; See also: List of presidents of Trentino	22 October 2018	Northern League

== Prussia ==
From 1875 the territorial authority of the estates in the twelve administrative provinces of Prussia were re-organised as Provinzialverbände. Each of these self-governing bodies were represented in a Provinziallandtag assembly, whose members were delegated by the rural and urban districts within the province. The districts organised through their elected deputies their utilities, such as construction and maintenance of provincial roads, hospitals, schools, public savings banks, waste disposal etc., in self-rule.

The provincial administration was initially headed by a Landesdirektor, who was elected by the assembly for six-year terms (in Pomerania: five years) and maximally two terms. The holder of the office presided over the Provinzialausschuss, i.e. provincial government of self-rule, whereas the Oberpräsident was the king-appointed representative for the province, busy with implementing and supervising central prerogatives of the Prussian government.

In the following decades, Landeshauptmann gradually replaced the earlier expression Landesdirektor in all but one of Prussia's provinces. When the kingdom turned into a free state in 1920, only the Landtag of Brandenburg had decided to keep the traditional expression. With the abolition of democratic self-rule on all government levels in the course of the Gleichschaltung process after the Nazi takeover in 1933, the office-holders were furloughed or retired and the offices remained vacant.

=== Klaipėda Region ===
The Klaipėda Region (German: Memelland), which was dissected from East Prussia after World War I and annexed by Lithuania in the Klaipėda Revolt of 1923, continued the usage of the terms Landesdirektor (i.e. government member) and Landesdirektorium (Lithuanian: krašto direktorija; i.e. government). The head of government was given the title Landespräsident (state president).
