= Landesrat =

Landesrat (German: council(lor) of the land) is a German language designation of offices or institutions in government or administration

- In Austria: a member of the Landesregierung in one of the States of Austria
  - A similar office in the Politics of Trentino-Alto Adige/Südtirol
- An officer appointed by Landschaftsversammlung to the Landschaftsverbände in North Rhine-Westphalia
- The parliament of the Saar (League of Nations) (1922–1935)
- An institution in a state-level subdivision of the German party Die Linke
- In former Prussia: the highest level of administrators of the Provinzialverwaltung, elected by Provinziallandtag, reporting to the Landeshauptmann

== See also ==
- de:Landrat, a disambiguation page in German Wikipedia
- Landtag
