= Kompatscher =

Kompatscher is a Germanised version of the Ladin toponymic surname Ciampac and may refer to:

- Arno Kompatscher (born 1971), Italian politician and governor of South Tyrol
- Franz Kompatscher, mayor of Brenner, South Tyrol, Italy
