= Government of South Tyrol =

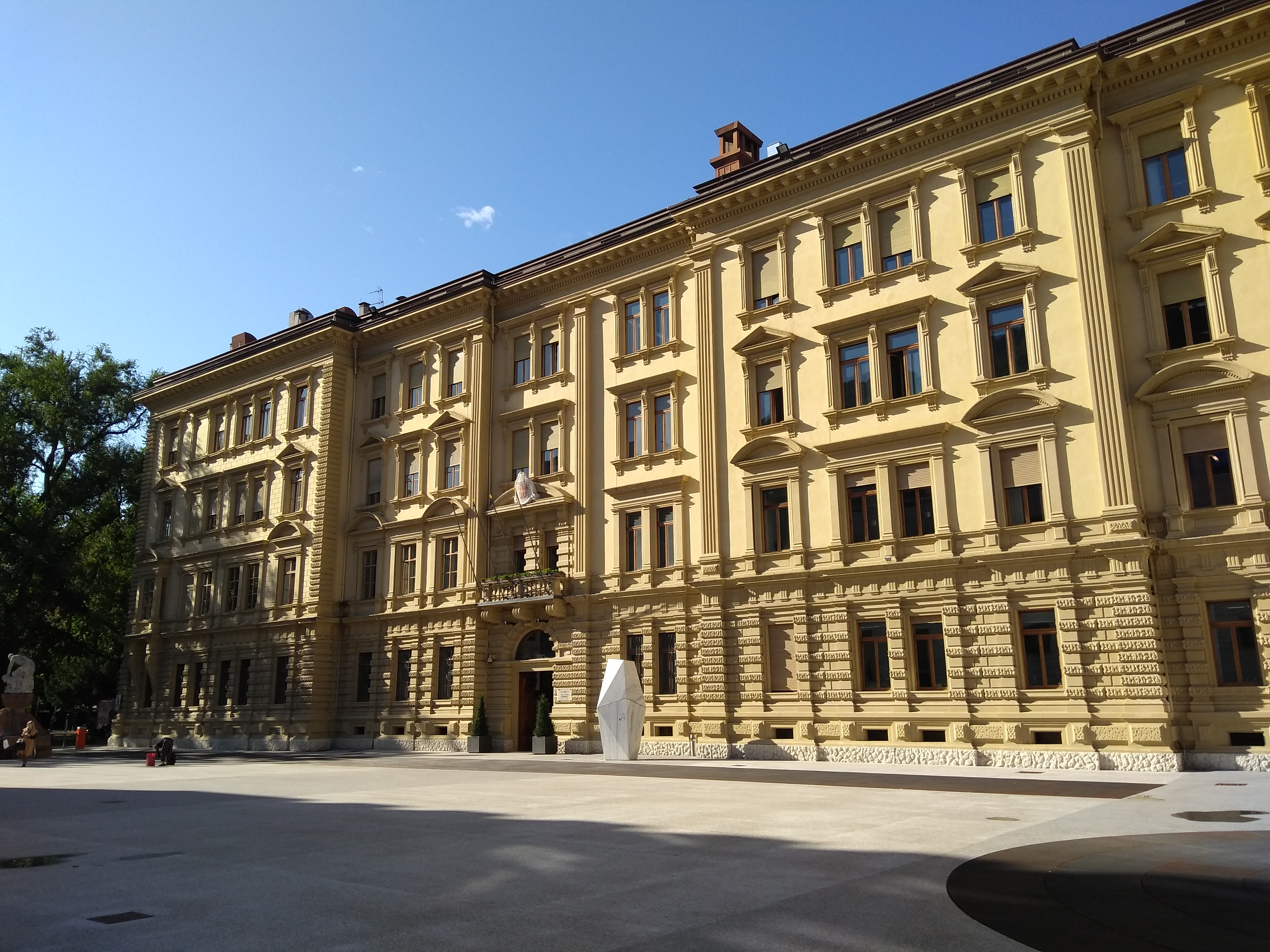
Palais Widmann in Bolzano, seat of the South Tyrolean government.

The Government of South Tyrol (German: Südtiroler Landesregierung; Italian: Giunta provinciale) is the chief executive body of the autonomous province of South Tyrol in northern Italy, enforcing the provincial laws as written by the provincial council (German: Landtag). The government has its seat in the capital city of Bolzano.

The local government system is based upon the provisions of the Italian Constitution and the Autonomy Statute of the Region Trentino-Alto Adige/Südtirol. The Landesregierung is headed by a governor, referred to as Landeshauptmann ("State Captain") in German (Italian: Presidente della Giunta Provinciale). The members of the government are elected in a secret ballot by an absolute majority in the Landtag. The composition of the cabinet has to reflect the proportion of the German, Italian and Ladin language groups.

The current government is headed by Arno Kompatscher (SVP).

== See also ==
- Politics of South Tyrol
