= Regional Council of Trentino-Alto Adige/Südtirol =

Legislative organ of Trentino-Alto Adige, Italy

Regional Council of Trentino-Alto Adige/Südtirol Consiglio regionale del Trentino-Alto Adige Regionalrat Trentino-Südtirol Consei dla Region Trentin-Südtirol
- 17th Legislature

Type
- Type: Regional council Unicameral

Leadership
- President: Roberto Paccher (Lega Trentino)

Structure
- Seats: 70
- Political groups: Government 40): SVP (13); League group (6); FdI (4); NTpF (4); PATT–Fassa (4); PATT (3) (Note: Councillors Maria Bosin, Walter Kaswalder and Mario Tonina.); AF (1) (Note: Councillor Luca Guglielmi.); LC group (4); FI (2); LC (2); FSW (1) (Note: Councillor Thomas Widmann.); Mixed Group (1); DF (1) (Note: Councillor Ulli Mair.); Opposition (30): PD (8); CB (5) (Note: Including 4 councillors affiliated with Campobase, among them presidential candidate Francesco Valduga.); CA (1) (Note: Councillor Paola Demagri.); Green group (4); V-G-V (3) (Note: Councillors Brigitte Foppa, Zeno Oberkofler, and Madeleine Rohrer.); EV (1) (Note: Councillor Lucia Coppola.); Team K (4); STF (4); V-WB (2); Vita (1) (Note: Councillor Renate Holzeisen.); WB (1) (Note: Councillor Andreas Colli.); Mixed Group (3); Onda (1) (Note: Councillor Filippo Degasperi.); FF (1) (Note: Former DF councillor Andreas Leiter Reber.); JWA (1) (Note: Councillor Jürgen Wirth Anderlan.)

Elections
- Last election: 22 October 2023
- Next election: 2028

Meeting place
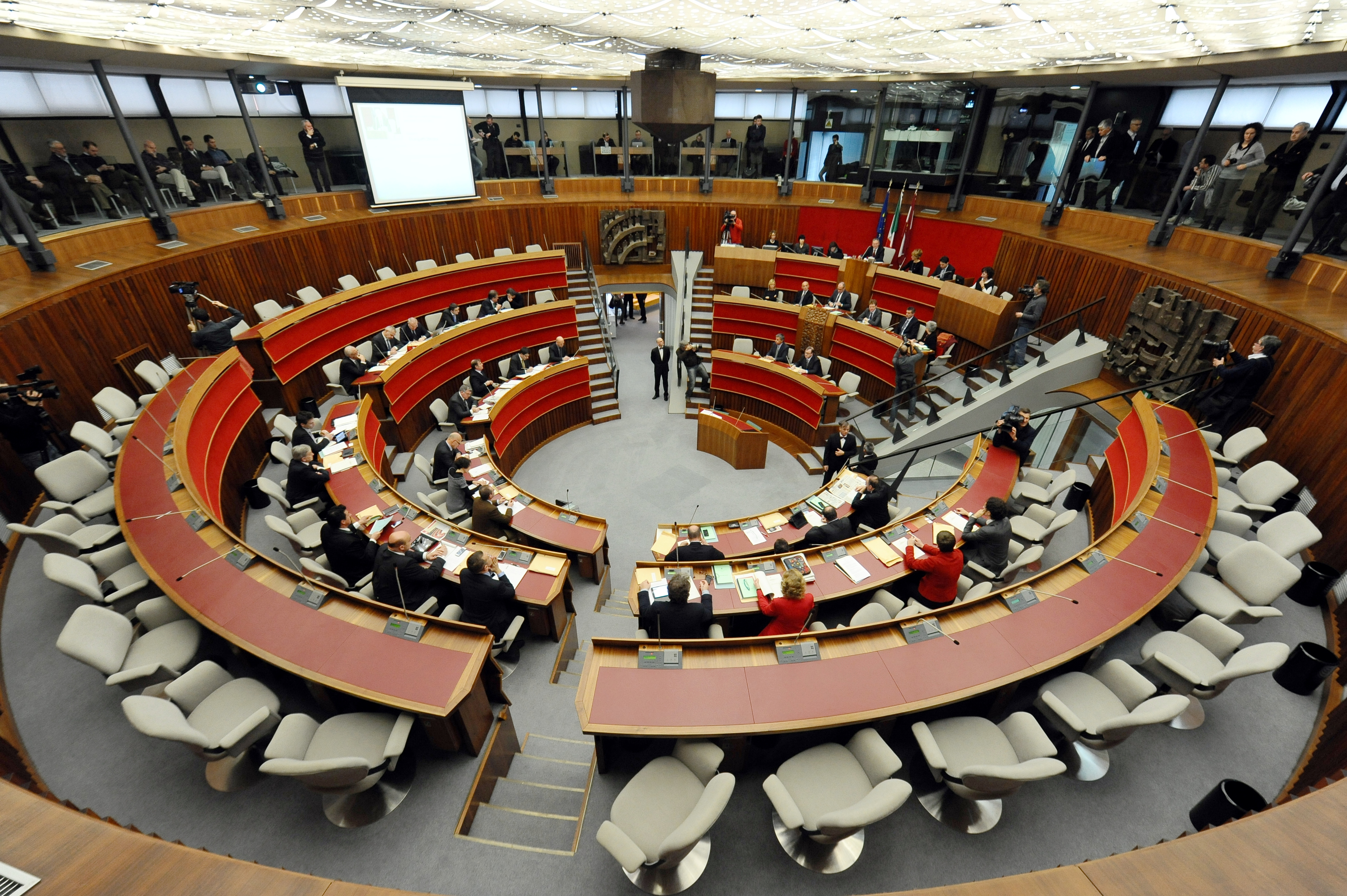
- Board Room, Piazza Dante, Trento

Website
- Official website

The Regional Council of Trentino-Alto Adige/Südtirol (Italian: Consiglio regionale del Trentino-Alto Adige; German: Regionalrat Trentino-Südtirol; Ladin: Consei dla Region Trentin-Südtirol) is the legislative assembly of the autonomous region of Trentino-Alto Adige/Südtirol.

The assembly was elected for the first time in 1948. It meets alternately in Trento and Bolzano.

== Composition ==
The Regional Council of Trentino-Alto Adige/Südtirol is composed of 35 members of the Provincial Council of Trentino and of 35 members of the Landtag of South Tyrol.

For the first half of the term the President of the Regional Council is elected among the members of the Italian-speaking group, for the second among those in the German language. Alternatively, a councillor belonging to the Ladin language group may be elected as President, with the consensus of the majority of the group that will have to renounce it.

=== Political groups ===
The Regional Council of Trentino-Alto Adige/Südtirol is currently composed of the following political groups:

Party	Seats
South Tyrolean People's Party	13 / 70
Democratic Party	8 / 70
Lega Trentino – Lega Alto Adige Südtirol	6 / 70
Campobase	5 / 70
Trentino Tyrolean Autonomist Party – Fassa Association	5 / 70
Brothers of Italy	4 / 70
Team K	4 / 70
South Tyrolean Freedom	4 / 70
Green Group (incl. Greens and Green Europe)	4 / 70
The Civic List (Trentino)	4 / 70
We Trentino for Fugatti for President (Lega Trentino)	3 / 70
Forza Italia	2 / 70
Vita – Us Citizens	2 / 70
The Civic List (South Tyrol)	2 / 70
Mixed group	4 / 70

== See also ==
- Landtag of South Tyrol
- Politics of Trentino-Alto Adige/Südtirol
- Regional council
