= Leopoldo Elia =

Italian politician (1925–2008)

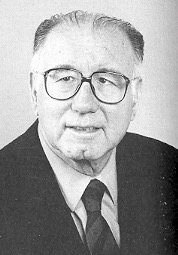

President of the Constitutional court
- In office 21 September 1981 – 7 May 1985
- Preceded by: Leonetto Amadei
- Succeeded by: Livio Paladin

Minister for Electoral and Institutional Reforms
- In office 28 April 1993 – 10 May 1994
- Prime Minister: Carlo Azeglio Ciampi
- Preceded by: Mino Martinazzoli
- Succeeded by: Francesco Speroni

Minister of Foreign Affairs
- Acting; 19 April 1994 – 10 May 1994
- Prime Minister: Carlo Azeglio Ciampi
- Preceded by: Beniamino Andreatta
- Succeeded by: Antonio Martino

Member of the Senate
- In office 9 July 1987 – 22 April 1992
- Constituency: Roma VIII
- In office 9 May 1996 – 29 May 2001
- Constituency: Milano Baggio - Quarto Oggiaro

Member of the Chamber of Deputies
- In office 12 April 1994 – 8 May 1996
- Constituency: Lazio 2

Personal details
- Born: 4 November 1925 Fano, Marche, Italy
- Died: 5 October 2008 (aged 82) Rome, Lazio, Italy
- Party: DC (until 1994); PPI (1994–2002)
- Education: Sapienza University of Rome
- Profession: Politician, Judge

Leopoldo Elia (4 November 1925 – 5 October 2008) was an Italian politician.

== Biography ==
Leopoldo Elia was born in Fano, Marche, in 1925. His father was Raffaele Elia, the secretary of the Italian People's Party in Fano in the first post-war period and senator of Christian Democracy in the first two legislatures of the Republic.

He graduated on 25 November 1947 in law from the Sapienza University of Rome. He worked as Official of the Senate from 1 February 1950 to 30 November 1962. He was secretary of the Group of Italian Parliamentarians to the Council of Europe and to the Common Assembly of the ECSC, and subsequently carried out managerial functions in the Assembly Secretariat, charged with formulating a constitution for Europe.

Elia taught public law institutions in the Faculty of Economics and Business of the University of Urbino (Ancona branch) from 1960 to 1963 and, as full professor, constitutional law in the Faculty of Law of the University of the Studies of Ferrara in the academic year 1962–63, of the University of Turin from 1963 to 1970 and of the Sapienza University of Rome from 1970 to 1997. During the Turin years (1963–70) he formed around him a real school, made up of Gustavo Zagrebelsky, Alfonso Di Giovine, Mario Dogliani and Francesco Pizzetti.

He was elected judge of the Constitutional court by the Parliament on 30 April 1976, of which he became president in on 21 September 1981. He ceased office as President on 7 May 1985.

Subsequently he was elected to the Senate in the X Legislature (1987–92) among the ranks of the Christian Democracy. From 28 April 1993 to 10 May 1994 he served as Minister for Electoral and Institutional Reforms in the Ciampi Cabinet and from 19 April to 10 May 1994 was also Minister of Foreign Affairs ad interim, taking the place of Beniamino Andreatta who resigned as candidate for the European Parliament elections. In 1994 he was elected to the Chamber of Deputies in the XII Legislature (1994–96) and in 1996 was elected again Senator in the XIII Legislature (1996–2001). In this legislature he was president of the PPI group in the Senate.

He died on 5 October 2008, at the age of 83.
