= Ugo Rossi =

Italian politician

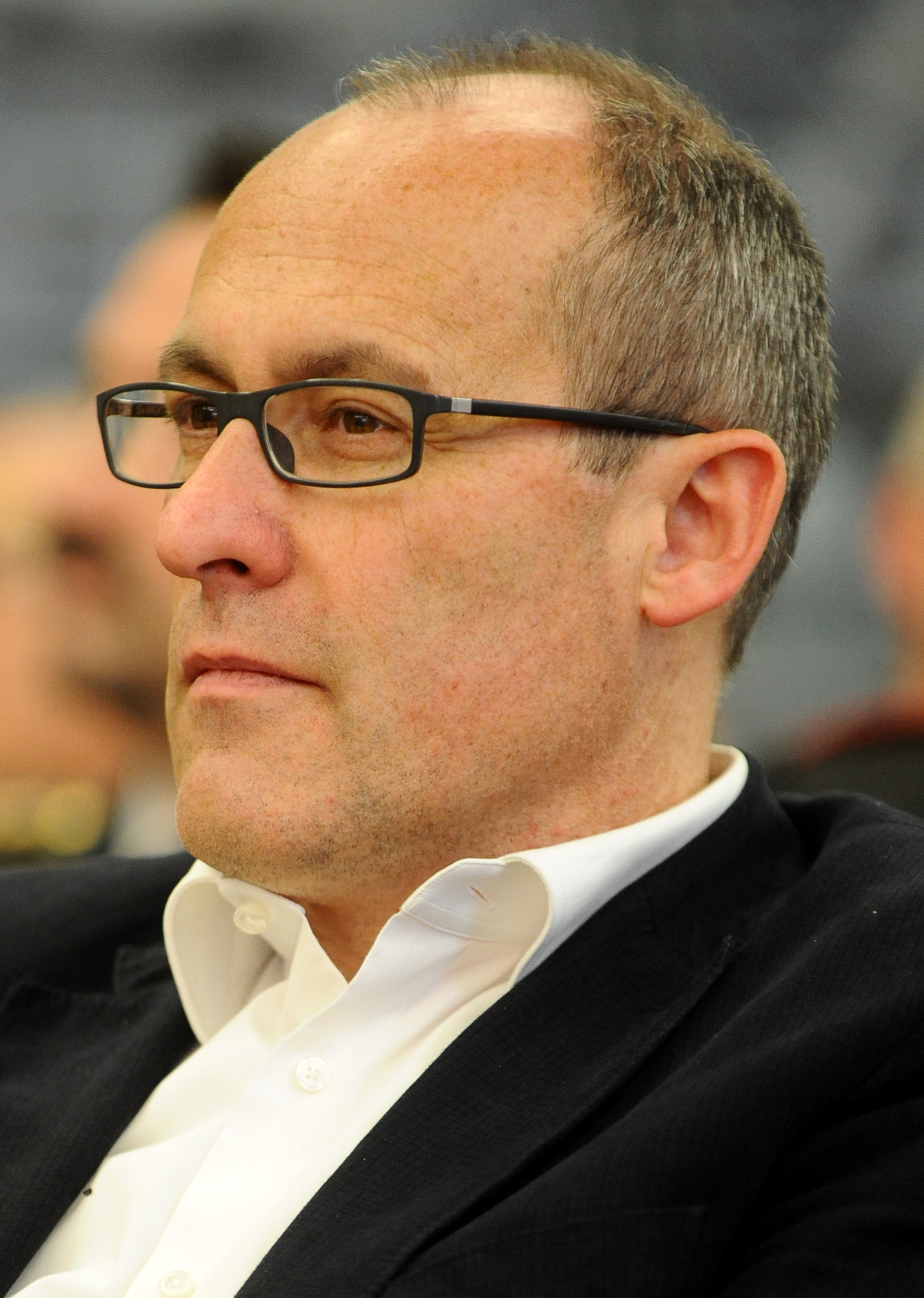

President of Trentino
- In office 9 November 2013 – 2 November 2018
- Preceded by: Lorenzo Dellai
- Succeeded by: Maurizio Fugatti

President of Trentino-Alto Adige/Südtirol
- In office 27 February 2014 – 15 June 2016
- Preceded by: Alberto Pacher
- Succeeded by: Arno Kompatscher

Personal details
- Party: PATT (1999–2021); Action (2021–2022); Autonomy House (2023–)

Ugo Rossi (born 29 May 1963 in Milan) is an Italian politician, member of the Trentino Tyrolean Autonomist Party.

== Overview ==
He was born in Milan where his parents had moved in the 1950s from Ossana in the Val di Sole. Ugo Rossi moved back to Trentino permanently after completing law school. Before entering politics, he worked in the insurance sector and for the company managing the Trento–Malè–Marilleva railway.

He joined the Trentino Tyrolean Autonomist Party in 1999. In 2013 he won the Trentino provincial elections with his center-left coalition obtaining 58% of the votes. He was elected President of the Autonomous Province of Trento for a term of five years.

In 2014 he was elected president of Trentino-Alto Adige/Südtirol by the Regional Council. His term ended on 15 June 2016.
