= Giovanni Kessler =

Italian politician (born 1956)

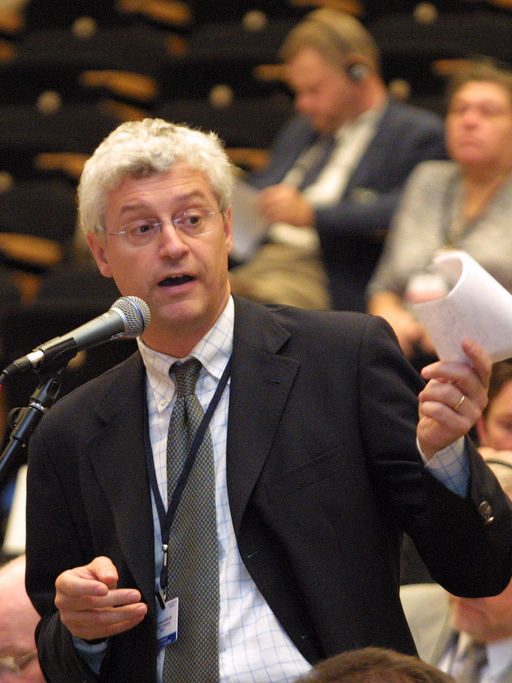
Kessler at the Organization for Security and Co-operation in Europe Parliamentary Assembly

Giovanni Kessler (born 11 June 1956 in Trento) is an Italian prosecutor. He was until 2017 the Director-General of the European Anti-Fraud Office (OLAF). OLAF is a department of the European Commission, but it is independent in its investigative function. Based in Brussels, OLAF is tasked with protecting the financial interests of the European Union by investigating fraud, corruption and any other illegal activities. It also investigates serious matters relating to the discharge of professional duties by members and staff of the EU institutions and it supports the EU institutions, in particular the European Commission, in the development and implementation of anti-fraud legislation and policies.

== Early life and education ==
Giovanni Kessler is the son of Bruno Kessler (1924–1991), a former President of the Autonomous Province of Trento and vice-minister to the Interior. Kessler graduated in law at the University of Bologna.

== Career ==
In 1985, Kessler became a member of the Italian judiciary and served as prosecutor in the courts of Trento and then of Bolzano. From 1995 he worked for two years as anti-mafia prosecutor in Caltanissetta (Sicily) at the anti-mafia Directorate.

From 1998 to 1999, Kessler was Deputy Head of the OSCE Kosovo Verification Mission in Pristina, in charge of Police and Justice matters. As judicial expert, he also participated to several evaluation missions of the European Commission and Council of Europe in Eastern Europe.

=== Member of the Parliament of Italy, 2001–2006 ===
In 2001, Kessler was elected to the Italian Parliament as an independent member. He sat on the Committee on Justice Affairs and during his five-year term, he authored numerous bills on the International Criminal Court (ICC), the European Convention against corruption, the International Judiciary Cooperation and the European Arrest Warrant.

In addition to his committee assignments, Kessler was also a member of the Italian delegation to the Parliamentary Assembly of the Organization for Security and Co-operation in Europe (OSCE). From 2003 until 2006, he served as Vice-President of the Assembly. He participated in and led International Election Monitoring missions in the United States and in many other OSCE countries. In 2003, the OSCE Chairman-in-Office, Dutch Foreign Minister Jaap de Hoop Scheffer, appointed Kessler as his Special Representative during that year's parliamentary election in Armenia.

From 2006 to 2008, Kessler held the position of Italian High Commissioner to Combat Counterfeiting.

In December 2008, Kessler was elected member, and subsequently President, of the Legislative Assembly of the Autonomous Province of Trento. He resigned from this position before taking up the post of Director-General of OLAF in early 2011.

In 2009 Kessler started with Dieter Steger (SVP) and Herwig van Staa (ÖVP), chairmen of the legislative assemblies of South Tyrol and Tyrol, the project of a Euroregion that, for the three territories, would represent a recovery of historical Tyrol. The legislative assemblies of the autonomous provinces of Trentino and South Tyrol and Tyrol then unanimously approved the Euroregion Tyrol – South Tyrol – Trentino.

=== Head of OLAF, 2011–2017 ===
In 2010, Kessler was nominated for the post of Director-General of OLAF, the Anti-Fraud office of the European Union. In late 2010, the European Parliament voted narrowly to put Kessler ahead of Thierry Cretin, an OLAF director. Later, the Council of the European Union decided that Kessler and Johan Denolf, from the anti-fraud unit of the Belgian judicial police, were their top two.

Kessler took office in February 2011 and soon became engaged in a comprehensive reform process to strengthen the efficiency of OLAF, aiming to step-up the fight against fraud and corruption in Europe. In 2012, he was elected President of the European Partners Against Corruption / European Anti-Corruption Network (EPAC/EACN), a formal network comprising close to fifty anti-corruption authorities from European Union Member States. The Network was set up to improve cooperation between authorities mandated with the fight against corruption in the European Union, as well as to foster closer relations between Member States and the European institutions.

Upon taking office, Kessler led the investigation into the 2011 cash for influence scandal in the European Parliament. During that time, OLAF was working closely with national authorities from Austria, Slovenia, Romania, Spain, Belgium and France; two MEPs – from Austria and Slovenia – resigned; a third was suspended by his party.

In 2012, following an OLAF investigation into alleged requests for payment from a tobacco company, EU Health Commissioner John Dalli resigned. The EU courts dismissed Dalli's actions against the Commission concerning his departure and the OLAF investigation. In separate proceedings in Belgium concerning the alleged unlawful interception of telephone communications during the investigation, a Brussels court sentenced Kessler in 2023 to one year in prison. In June 2024 the Brussels Court of Appeal ordered a suspension of the pronouncement of sentence (suspension du prononcé), under which no conviction is pronounced and no penalty is imposed.

In 2013, he became a Member of the Executive Committee of the International Association of Anti-Corruption Authorities (IAACA). IAACA has more than three hundred organizational members which cover nearly all law enforcement national institutions and bodies entrusted with the task of fighting against corruption and more than two thousand individual members, including prosecutors, investigators and experts with experience in anti-corruption research or practice.

In 2014, Kessler became a member of the commission on appointment of the new bureau chief of the Ukrainian anti-Corruption Bureau.

In 2017, Marine Le Pen filed a lawsuit against OLAF and Kessler himself, charging that the anti-fraud office acted as a tool of President of the European Parliament Martin Schulz to undermine her and her party. Marine Le Pen was eventually sent to trial in France for misuse of EU funds.

=== Head of the Italian Customs and Monopoly Agency, 2017–2018 ===
In July 2017, Kessler was appointed as head of the Italian Customs and Monopoly Agency in Rome.

=== Member of the International Anti-corruption Advisory Board in Ukraine (IACAB), 2017–2020 ===
In September 2017, Kessler joined the IACAB, which operates in the framework of the European Union Anti-Corruption Initiative in Ukraine.

In 2022 Kessler founded 'EUcraina', an Italian volunteer association that supports the Ukrainian people invaded by the Russians.
