= Margherita Cogo =

Italian politician

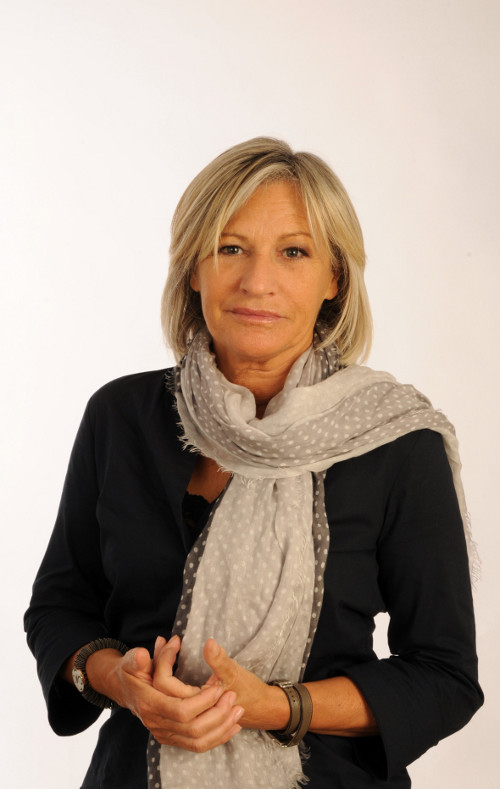

President of Trentino-Alto Adige
- In office 11 March 1999 – 14 March 2002
- Preceded by: Tarcisio Grandi
- Succeeded by: Carlo Andreotti

Personal details
- Born: 2 October 1951 (age 74) Tione di Trento, Italy
- Party: Democrats of the Left
- Education: University of Padua
- Profession: Politician

Margherita Cogo (born 2 October 1951) was the first woman to be President of the Italian autonomous region of Trentino-Alto Adige/Südtirol and also the region's first Vice President.

== Biography ==
Margherita Cogo was born in 1951 in Tione di Trento, Italy. She graduated from the University of Padua with a degree in philosophy and then married and had two children. Cogo began her career as a humanities teacher in a local middle school and later taught literature.

In 1985 she was elected to serve on the City Council of Tione, as a candidate from the Italian Socialist Party. She was re-elected in 1990 and then in 1993 was appointed as Mayor. Two years later, when mayoral races became elected positions, Cogo ran for the position and was elected. That same year, she became President of the Valli Giudicarie District Health Committee and in 1997 joined the Executive Council of the Consortium of Trentino Communes, dealing with culture and health issues of the area. During her terms as Mayor, she was particularly interested in infrastructure development.

In 1998, she was elected to the Regional Council of Trentino-Alto Adige and in 1999 became the first woman President of the Trentino-Alto Adige/Südtirol Region. Her term was faced with ethnic conflicts and she worked for their resolution, through initiatives to ensure the autonomy of the region and reform the electoral codes. In 2002, she resigned her presidency and returned to her seat in the assembly. There, she focused on education, equality initiatives, and state welfare programs and health policies. In 2003, she was re-elected and became the first female Vice President of the region and the Councillor of Culture. In that capacity, she worked to create the Museo della scienza (Museum of Science) (MUSE) and spearheaded a major multi-year project, focused on researching and recovering cultural heritage centered on the Great War. The project aimed at restoration of monuments and buildings in the region, such as Fort Cadine, the Loggia del Romanino at Buonconsiglio Castle, the Malga Palazzo Nature Reserve at Scanuppia, the Ruatti Mill at Rabbi, the Torre Vanga in Trent and the Venetian Bastion Monument in the Bondo cemetery in Riva del Garda, as well as establishing museums throughout the area.

In 2008, she was re-elected to the post, but did not stand for renomination in 2013. In 2014, she became the President of the Scuola Musicale Giudicarie (Giudicarie Music School).
