= Giorgio Grigolli =

Italian politician (1927–2016)

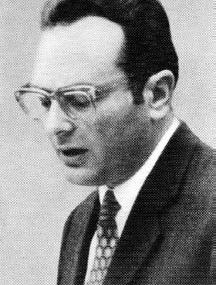

President of the Autonomous Province of Trento
- In office 13 March 1974 – 15 March 1979
- Preceded by: Bruno Kessler
- Succeeded by: Flavio Mengoni

President of Trentino-Alto Adige
- In office 12 March 1967 – 7 January 1974
- Preceded by: Luigi Dalvit
- Succeeded by: Bruno Kessler

Personal details
- Born: 21 December 1927 Mori, Trentino, Italy
- Died: 8 November 2016 (aged 88) Trento, Trentino, Italy
- Party: DC
- Education: University of Bologna
- Profession: Politician, journalist

Giorgio Grigolli (21 December 1927 – 8 November 2016) was an Italian politician. He has been President of Trentino-Alto Adige/Südtirol (1967–1974) and Trentino (1974–1979).

== Biography ==
Grigolli was born in Mori, Italy. He studied at the Giovanni Prati high school in Trento, where he was a classmate of Beniamino Andreatta. He graduated in law from the University of Bologna in 1952. In 1952 he became editor of the newspaper l'Adige. From 17 October 1961 to 1 December 1967 he was its deputy director in charge.

In 1958 he became provincial secretary of the Christian Democracy. From 1973 to 1993 he was regional secretary. He was provincial councilor from 1964 to 1983, for four terms. From 1965 to 1968 he was the chairman of the DC.

From 13 March 1974 to 15 March 1979 he was president of the Autonomous province of Trento, for two mandates.

In 1970 he was one of the founders of Marcialonga. He was first vice president (under Ito Del Favero) and then president of Calcio Trento (between the end of the 1970s and the early 1990s).

Grigolli died on 8 November 2016, aged 89, in Trento.

== Honours and awards ==
- Italy: Grand Officer of the Order of Merit of the Italian Republic (27 December 1972)
