= 1960 Trentino-Alto Adige/Südtirol regional election =

The Trentino-Alto Adige/Südtirol regional election of 1960 took place on 6 November 1960.

Following inter-ethnic tensions, the German minority refused to join the administration, and the Christian Democracy formed a classic centrist majority with the Democratic Socialists and the Liberals.

== Results ==
=== Regional Council ===
| Party | votes | votes (%) | seats |
|---|---|---|---|
| Christian Democracy | 180,940 | 41.0 | 20 |
| South Tyrolean People's Party | 132,351 | 30.0 | 15 |
| Italian Socialist Party | 41,914 | 9.5 | 4 |
| Italian Democratic Socialist Party | 23,955 | 5.4 | 3 |
| Italian Social Movement | 20,969 | 4.8 | 2 |
| Italian Communist Party | 19,383 | 4.4 | 2 |
| Italian Liberal Party–Italian Democratic Party of Monarchist Unity | 11,168 | 2.5 | 1 |
| Trentino Tyrolean People's Party | 9,008 | 2.0 | 1 |
| Italian Republican Party | 2,099 | 0.5 | - |
| Total | 441,787 | 100.0 | 48 |

Source: Trentino-Alto Adige/Südtirol Region

=== Trentino ===
| Party | votes | votes (%) | seats |
|---|---|---|---|
| Christian Democracy | 150,663 | 64.2 | 17 |
| Italian Socialist Party | 29,697 | 12.7 | 3 |
| Italian Democratic Socialist Party | 16,411 | 7.0 | 2 |
| Italian Communist Party | 12,869 | 5.5 | 1 |
| Trentino Tyrolean People's Party | 9,008 | 3.8 | 1 |
| Italian Liberal Party | 8,329 | 3.6 | 1 |
| Italian Social Movement | 6,282 | 2.7 | 1 |
| Italian Republican Party | 1,282 | 0.5 | - |
| Total | 234,541 | 100.0 | 26 |

Source: Trentino-Alto Adige/Südtirol Region

=== South Tyrol ===
| Party | votes | votes (%) | seats |
|---|---|---|---|
| South Tyrolean People's Party | 132,351 | 63.9 | 15 |
| Christian Democracy | 30,277 | 14.6 | 3 |
| Italian Social Movement | 14,687 | 7.1 | 1 |
| Italian Socialist Party | 12,217 | 5.9 | 1 |
| Italian Democratic Socialist Party | 7,544 | 3.6 | 1 |
| Italian Communist Party | 6,514 | 3.1 | 1 |
| Italian Liberal Party–Italian Democratic Party of Monarchist Unity | 2,839 | 1.4 | - |
| Italian Republican Party | 817 | 0.4 | - |
| Total | 207,246 | 100.0 | 22 |

Source: Trentino-Alto Adige/Südtirol Region
