= Bruno Kessler =

Italian politician (1924–1991)

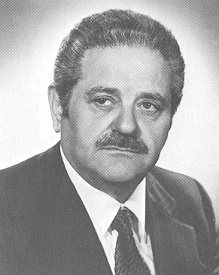

President of Trentino-Alto Adige
- In office 7 January 1974 – 24 July 1976
- Preceded by: Giorgio Grigolli
- Succeeded by: Flavio Mengoni

President of the Autonomous Province of Trento
- In office 30 December 1960 – 13 March 1974
- Preceded by: Riccardo Rosa
- Succeeded by: Giorgio Grigolli

Member of the Senate
- In office 1983–1992
- Constituency: Mezzolombardo

Member of the Chamber of Deputies
- In office 1976–1983
- Constituency: Trento

Personal details
- Born: 17 February 1924 Peio, Trentino, Italy
- Died: 19 March 1991 (aged 67) Trento, Trentino, Italy
- Party: DC
- Spouse: Cecilia Tommasoni
- Children: Giovanni Kessler
- Education: University of Padua
- Profession: Politician, lawyer

Bruno Kessler (17 February 1924, in Peio – 19 March 1991, in Trento) was an Italian politician. He served as President of the Autonomous Province of Trento from 1960 to 1973. He was the father of Giovanni Kessler.

In 1962, he founded the Istituto Trentino di Cultura (now Fondazione Bruno Kessler), which gave rise to the University of Trento.

== Biography ==
In 1943, he obtained his classical maturity at Rovereto and in 1950 graduated in Law from the University of Padua.

He was president of the Autonomous Province of Trento from 1960 to 1974. In 1962, he founded the "Trentino Institute of Culture", the first core of the University of Trento. The Faculty of Sociology was the first of its kind in Italy. He supported the 1972 Autonomy Statute and the Provincial Urban Plan. He was also elected to the Senate in 1983 and 1987. He died in 1991 during the X Legislature and was later replaced by Alberto Robol.

In 2007, the Trentino Institute of Culture became the Bruno Kessler Foundation (FBK).
