= 1952 Trentino-Alto Adige/Südtirol regional election =

The Trentino-Alto Adige/Südtirol regional election of 1952 took place on 16 November 1952.

The Christian Democracy and the South Tyrolean People's Party won again.

== Results ==
=== Regional Council ===
| Party | votes | votes (%) | seats |
|---|---|---|---|
| Christian Democracy | 157,256 | 41.1 | 20 |
| South Tyrolean People's Party | 112,602 | 29.4 | 15 |
| Italian Socialist Party | 27,406 | 7.2 | 3 |
| Italian Democratic Socialist Party | 21,849 | 5.7 | 3 |
| Italian Communist Party | 17,029 | 4.5 | 2 |
| Italian Social Movement | 15,191 | 4.0 | 2 |
| Trentino Tyrolean People's Party | 12,906 | 3.4 | 2 |
| Italian Liberal Party–Italian Republican Party | 7,903 | 2.1 | - |
| Independentists' Alliance | 4,683 | 1.2 | 1 |
| Monarchist National Party | 3,227 | 0.8 | - |
| Others | 2,903 | 0.8 | - |
| Total | 382,955 | 100.0 | 48 |

Source: Trentino-Alto Adige/Südtirol Region

=== Trentino ===
| Party | votes | votes (%) | seats |
|---|---|---|---|
| Christian Democracy | 133,392 | 63.8 | 17 |
| Italian Socialist Party | 17,410 | 8.3 | 2 |
| Italian Democratic Socialist Party | 15,836 | 7.6 | 2 |
| Trentino Tyrolean People's Party | 12,906 | 6.2 | 2 |
| Italian Communist Party | 11,694 | 5.6 | 1 |
| Italian Social Movement | 6,874 | 3.3 | 1 |
| Independentists' Alliance | 4,683 | 2.2 | 1 |
| Italian Liberal Party–Italian Republican Party | 4,448 | 2.1 | - |
| Others | 1,838 | 0.9 | - |
| Total | 209,081 | 100.0 | 26 |

Source: Trentino-Alto Adige/Südtirol Region

=== South Tyrol ===
| Party | votes | votes (%) | seats |
|---|---|---|---|
| South Tyrolean People's Party | 112,602 | 64.8 | 15 |
| Christian Democracy | 23,864 | 13.7 | 3 |
| Italian Socialist Party | 9,996 | 5.8 | 1 |
| Italian Social Movement | 8,317 | 4.8 | 1 |
| Italian Democratic Socialist Party | 6,013 | 3.5 | 1 |
| Italian Communist Party | 5,335 | 3.1 | 1 |
| Italian Liberal Party–Italian Republican Party | 3,455 | 2.0 | - |
| Monarchist National Party | 3,227 | 1.9 | - |
| Others | 1,065 | 0.6 | - |
| Total | 173,874 | 100.0 | 22 |

Source: Trentino-Alto Adige/Südtirol Region
