= 1956 Trentino-Alto Adige/Südtirol regional election =

Regional election

The Trentino-Alto Adige/Südtirol regional election of 1956 took place on 11 November 1956.

The Christian Democracy and the South Tyrolean People's Party won again.

== Results ==
=== Regional Council ===
Party	votes	votes (%)	seats
Christian Democracy	176,642	42.8	21
South Tyrolean People's Party	124,165	30.1	15
Italian Socialist Party–Italian Democratic Socialist Party	54,308	13.2	6
Italian Social Movement	16,136	3.9	2
Italian Communist Party	12,989	3.2	2
Trentino Tyrolean People's Party	9,541	2.3	1
Italian Liberal Party	8,911	2.2	1
Independentists' Alliance	2,668	0.7	-
Monarchist National Party	2,624	0.6	-
Italian Union	2.273	0.5	-
Others	2,602	0.6	-
Total	412,859	100.0	48

Source: Trentino-Alto Adige/Südtirol Region

=== Trentino ===
Party	votes	votes (%)	seats
Christian Democracy	148,966	67.7	18
Italian Socialist Party–Italian Democratic Socialist Party	35,708	16.2	4
Trentino Tyrolean People's Party	9,541	4.3	1
Italian Communist Party	8,786	4.0	1
Italian Liberal Party	7,242	3.3	1
Italian Social Movement	4,529	2.1	1
Independentists' Alliance	2,668	1.2	-
Monarchist National Party	2,624	1.2	-
Total	220,064	100.0	26

Source: Trentino-Alto Adige/Südtirol Region

=== South Tyrol ===
Party	votes	votes (%)	seats
South Tyrolean People's Party	124,165	64.4	15
Christian Democracy	27,676	14.4	3
Italian Social Movement	11,607	6.0	1
Italian Socialist Party	10,826	5.6	1
Italian Democratic Socialist Party	7,774	4.0	1
Italian Communist Party	4,203	2.2	1
Italian Union	2,273	1.2	1
Italian Liberal Party	1,669	0.9	-
Others	2,612	1.3	-
Total	192,795	100.0	22

Source: Trentino-Alto Adige/Südtirol Region
