= Union for Trentino =

Union for Trentino Unione per il Trentino
- Founder: Lorenzo Dellai
- Founded: 7 June 2008
- Dissolved: 2024
- Preceded by: Daisy Civic List
- Merged into: Campobase
- Headquarters: via Lunelli, 64; 38100 Trento
- Membership (2014): 2,800
- Ideology: Regionalism; Christian democracy Conservatism
- National affiliation: Alliance for Italy (2009–12); Civic Choice (2012–13); Populars for Italy (2013–14); Solidary Democracy (2014–16); Popular Civic List (2018)

Website
- www.unioneperiltrentino.it

The Union for Trentino (Italian: Unione per il Trentino, UpT) was a regionalist, centrist and Christian-democratic political party active in Trentino, Italy. The party has its roots in the experience of Daisy Civic List and was founded on 7 June 2008. Most recently the party was led by Tiziano Mellarini and Annalisa Caumo, while its most recognisable leader has been Lorenzo Dellai. The UpT was replaced by Campobase in 2022.

== History ==
=== Background and foundation ===
In the run-up to the 1998 provincial election, Lorenzo Dellai formed the Daisy Civic List in order to unite Trentino centrists affiliated with the centre-left into a single political force. In 2000 Francesco Rutelli took the Daisy as an example when he launched Democracy is Freedom – The Daisy (DL) at the national level. The Daisy Civic List thus became the provincial section of DL. In 2007 DL merged with the Democrats of the Left in order to form the Democratic Party (PD).

After the defeat of the centre-left in Trentino in the 2008 general election, the Daisy was divided among those who wanted to continue toward the consolidation of the regionalist party and those who wanted to establish the provincial section of the PD. The Daisy thus suffered the separation of the "Democrats" from the "regionalists". Lunelli, supported by Dellai, former senator Mauro Betta and eight provincial deputies out of twelve, decided to take part in the foundation of the regionalist party, while senator Claudio Molinari and deputy Letizia De Torre chose to join the PD.

The new regionalist party, named Union for Trentino, was launched on 7 June, while the provincial PD was established on 8 June with the primary election for the first provincial secretary: Alberto Pacher. On 15 July Marco Tanas, a 35-year-old former Socialist, and Flavia Fontana were elected secretary and president of the UpT, respectively.

=== Dellai's third term as president ===
In the 2008 provincial election Dellai was re-elected President of the Province. The UpT gained 17.9% of the vote (making it the coalition's and the region's second largest party) and six seats, plus Dellai's, in the Provincial Council.

In the autumn of 2009 the UpT started playing an active role at the national level. On 11 December Dellai was a founding member of Alliance for Italy, which emerged mainly as a centrist split from the PD, along with Francesco Rutelli, Linda Lanzillotta, Bruno Tabacci and Elvio Ubaldi. Dellai was appointed by Rutelli national coordinator of the new party.

While he was increasingly engaged at the national level, Dellai was also active in Trentino and within the framework of the Tyrol–South Tyrol–Trentino Euroregion. In an interview, he pressed forward toward a provincial federation with the Trentino Tyrolean Autonomist Party (PATT) and the local Union of the Centre (UdC). This project was called by Dellai the "Party of Trentino".

Between 2010 and 2010 the UpT was led by Vittorio Fravezzi, a close ally of Dellai. In February 2012, during a party congress, Fontana was elected in his place by a large majority. Despite this and the "silence" by Silvano Grisenti (a former regional minister, convicted for corruption and later acquitted, who had forced Fravezzi's replacement and controlled 40% of the party's membership), the UpT seemed far from being united. During the congress, the goal of a "Party of Trentino" was confirmed, but this time the two parties which were invited to merge with the UpT were the PATT and the regional section of the Democratic Party (PD).

=== Playing a role in the national stage ===
In late December 2012 Dellai resigned from President of Trentino in order to take part to the foundation of Civic Choice (SC), a centrist party led by Mario Monti. Dellai was one of the leading figures of the new party and the UpT threw its weight behind him in this effort.

In the 2013 general election the UpT formed the core of the SC list for the Chamber of Deputies: the newly formed party won 19.6% in Trentino and Dellai was elected deputy. For the Senate the UpT formed an alliance with the PD and the PATT: the alliance won all three single-seat constituencies of Trentino and UpT's Fravezzi was elected senator in the constituency of Rovereto. Dellai became floor leader of SC in the Chamber.

In July the party suffered a setback in Trentino as its candidate in the centre-left primary election for President of Trentino, Mauro Gilmozzi, came third after the PATT's and the PD's candidates. The party was thus not able to secure the succession of Dellai.

In the provincial election the UpT garnered 13.3% and obtained 5 provincial councillors. Trentino Project (PT), set up by former UpT bigwig Grisenti, won 9.0%.

In April 2014 the outsider Donatella Conzatti defeated Corrado Buratti, outgoing president and candidate of the party's old guard, to become the party's secretary.

At the national level, in November 2013 Dellai left SC and was a founding member of the Populars for Italy (PpI), which he subsequently left in July 2014 to form Solidary Democracy (Demo.S). In the 2014 European Parliament election the UpT endorsed Herbert Dorfmann, top candidate of the South Tyrolean People's Party.

=== Mellarini v. Dellai ===
In the run-up of the 2015 municipal election in Trento Dellai launched Democratic Civic Construction (CCD), intended to integrate a larger electorate than that of the UpT alone. The list, which was approved by the provincial board of the party, despite Conzatti's opposition, and could be intended as a move toward an integration of the UpT into the PD, was the third largest in the election. The list was present also in Dro, where senator Fravezzi was re-elected mayor by a landslide.

In October Conzatti, who had lost the support of the party's majority, announced that the UpT would elect its new leadership during a congress in January 2016.

In the run-up of the congress, two candidates announced their bid for secretary: Dellai, supported by the party's old guard, and Tiziano Mellarini, regional minister and standard-bearer of a diverse front including Conzatti, Gilmozzi, former senator Renzo Michelini, all the provincial councillors and the municipal section of Trento; Dellai proposed a centre-left characterisation of the party, a closer relationship with the PD and a renewed alliance with the PATT, while Mellarini, a centrist, craved for an alliance with centrist parties, took inspiration from the European People's Party, would like the UpT to be equidistant from both the PD and the PATT. During the congressional campaign, while re-affirming his allegiance to the "autonomist centre-left" coalition and denying any "neo-centrist turn", Mellarini made clear that the CCD should not become a party (its members should be active as UpT members) and that a dialogue with unaffiliated "civic" forces, possibly including PT, should be welcome; on the contrary, Dellai and his supporters explained that his bid was intended to "avoid the genetic modification of the party" and that CCD would continue anyway.

On congress' day Dellai retired from the race and hinted that he was leaving the party. Consequently, Mellarini was almost unanimously elected secretary. He did not, however, officially accept his election as the office of secretary was incompatible with that of provincial minister, according to the party's constitution. Mellarini's supporters, including outgoing secretary Conzatti, proposed to cancel that provision, through a vote by party members, an option that was strongly opposed by Dellai's supporters. In late February the party's board elected Paolo Pipinato, an ally of Mellarini, as president and decided to hold a referendum among party members on the incompatibility clause. In early March the change to the party's constitution was approved and Mellarini took over as secretary.

Dellai and his allies, including senator Fravezzi, former senators Tarcisio Andreolli and Mauro Betta, and former secretary Fontana looked likely to leave the party, but chose to stay. In December Mellarini and Dellai signed a pact on the future of the party.

=== Decline and defeats ===
In the 2018 general election the autonomist centre-left was defeated for the first time since 1996. Under the new electoral system, which re-introduced single-seat constituencies also for the Chamber, the centre-right coalition, dominated by the Lega (Lega Nord Trentino) won all such constituencies in Trentino. Dellai was defeated in the Chamber's constituency of Pergine Valsugana, while Mellarini was defeated in the Senate's constituency of Rovereto (by Conzatti, who had switched sides).

Consequently Mellarini and Pipinato resigned from secretary and president, respectively. Soon after, the party elected Annalisa Caumo as president and it was decided that a new congress, which would elect the new secretary, would be held in January 2019, after the 2018 provincial election.

In the provincial election the party lost much of its support and fell to 4.0%. Moreover, the autonomist centre-left coalition was fractured: the UpT-supported PD's candidate won 25.4%, while PATT's Rossi stopped at 12.6%, and both lost to Maurizio Fugatti (Lega Nord Trentino), who went on to win with 46.7% of the vote.

The UpT's website was last updated in September 2021. In late 2021 Dellai proposed a new party called Campobase, along with UpT members. UpT's last Facebook post was in December 2021 endorsing the new party. Campobase was launched in February 2022 and its founding members included Dellai and most of UpT's leadership, notably including Annalisa Caumo and Chiara Maule, outgoing UpT vice president, who became the party's deputy coordinator and, later, deputy secretary.

== Popular support ==
The electoral results of the UpT in Trentino since 2008 are shown in the table below.

| 2008 provincial | 2009 European | 2013 general | 2013 provincial | 2014 European | 2018 general | 2018 provincial |
| 17.9 | – | 19.6 (Note: In list with Civic Choice, whose regional list for the Chamber was headed by Lorenzo Dellai.) | 13.3 | – (Note: The party endorsed the South Tyrolean People's Party, which included a candidate of the Trentino Tyrolean Autonomist Party.) | 2.2 (Note: In list with the Popular Civic List, whose regional list for the Chamber was headed by Lorenzo Dellai.) | 4.0 |

=== Provincial elections ===
| Election | Votes | % | Seats | +/– |
|---|---|---|---|---|
| 2008 | 49,035 | 17.92 | 6 / 35 | New |
| 2013 | 31,653 | 13.33 | 5 / 35 | ▼1 |
| 2018 | 10,150 | 3.98 | 1 / 35 | ▼4 |

== Leadership ==
- Secretary: Marco Tanas (2008–2010), Vittorio Fravezzi (2010–2012), Flavia Fontana (2012–2014), Donatella Conzatti (2014–2016), Tiziano Mellarini (2016–2018)
  - Coordinator: Nicola Ferrante (2009–2010), Giorgio Lunelli / Mauro Gilmozzi (joint political secretariat, 2010–2012), Valter Giacomazzi / Alessio Rauzi (2019–2022)
- President: Flavia Fontana (2008–2009), Luisa Zappini (2009–2011), Adriano Paoli (2011–2012), Corrado Buratti (2012–2014), Andrea Tomasi (2014–2016), Paolo Pipinato (2016–2018), Annalisa Caumo (2018–2022)
  - Vice President: Adriano Paoli (2009–2011), Ivonne Forno (2011–2012), Carmen Manfrini (2012–2014), Daniela Campestrin (2014–2016), Annalisa Caumo (2016–2018), Antonio La Torre (2018–2019), Chiara Maule (2019–2022)

== Sources ==
- Provincial Council of Trento – Legislatures
- Trentino Alto-Adige Region – Elections
- Provincial Government of Trento – Elections
- Cattaneo Institute – Archive of Election Data
- Ministry of the Interior – Historical Archive of Elections
