= Carlo Andreotti =

Italian politician

President of the Autonomous Province of Trento
- In office 1994–1999
- Preceded by: Gianni Bazzanella
- Succeeded by: Lorenzo Dellai

Presidents of Trentino-Alto Adige
- In office 2002–2004
- Preceded by: Margherita Cogo
- Succeeded by: Luis Durnwalder

Personal details
- Born: 21 May 1943 (age 82) Trento, Italy
- Party: PATT (until 2003)
- Profession: Politician

Carlo Andreotti (born 21 May 1943) is an Italian politician.

== Biography ==
Carlo Andreotti was born in Trento on 21 May 1943. He graduated in law and is licensed to practice as a lawyer. Later he became a journalist, he was editor of L'Adige and worked for RAI, becoming head of service.

In January 1988, it was founded the Trentino Tyrolean Autonomist Party (PATT) and Andreotti became its political secretary, a position he held until 1994, while from 1997 to 1999 he was its president.

In 1988 he was elected regional councillor, an office he held until 2008.

In the IX legislature (1994–199) Andreotti was president of the Province of Trento; from 2002 to 2004 he was president of Trentino-Alto Adige; finally, in the 2003 provincial elections he was the candidate for President of the Province with the support of the House of Freedoms, obtaining just 30.67% of the votes and thus being defeated by Lorenzo Dellai.
