= Lorenzo Dellai =

Italian politician (born 1959)

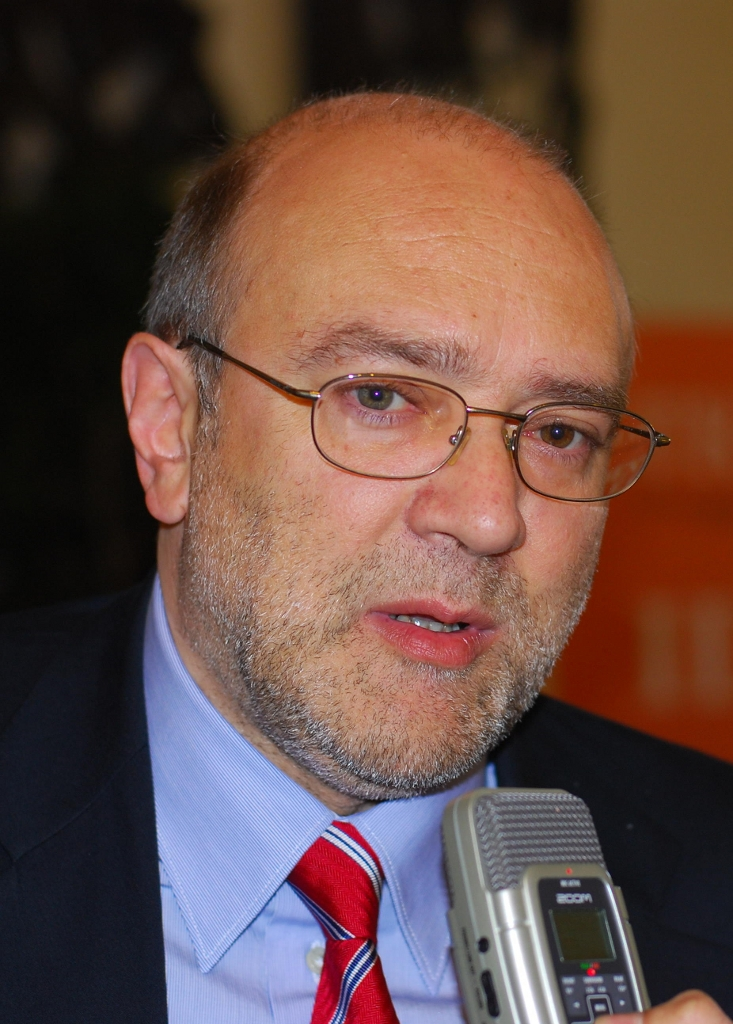

President of the Province of Trentino
- In office 24 February 1999 – 29 December 2012
- Preceded by: Carlo Andreotti
- Succeeded by: Alberto Pacher (interim)

President of Trentino-Alto Adige
- In office 15 June 2011 – 22 January 2013
- Preceded by: Luis Durnwalder
- Succeeded by: Alberto Pacher

Mayor of Trento
- In office 15 June 1990 – 2 October 1998
- Preceded by: Adriano Goio
- Succeeded by: Alberto Pacher

Personal details
- Party: Union for Trentino (since 2008); Campobase (since 2022)
- Other political affiliations: DC (1977–1994); PPI (1994–2002); CM (1998–2008); ApI (2008–2012); SC (2013); PpI (2013–2014); Demo.S (2014–2017)

Lorenzo Dellai (born 28 November 1959) is an Italian politician. He is a former member of the Chamber of Deputies, former mayor of Trento, former governor of the Autonomous Province of Trento, and former president of the region of Trentino-Alto Adige/Südtirol.

== Career ==
Born in Trento, Dellai was elected mayor of the city for the first time in 1990 and re-elected in 1995. In 1998, Dellai founded the Daisy Civic List, a regionalist political party active in Trentino.

Dellai has been the President of the Province of Trentino from 1999 to 2012, and the President of Trentino-Alto Adige/Südtirol from 2006 to 2008. In 2012, he joined Civic Choice and was elected deputy on electoral district Trentino Alto Adige.

Italian Chamber of Deputies
| Preceded by Title jointly held | Deputy for Constituency I – Trentino Alto Adige I 2013-present | Incumbent |
Political offices
| Preceded by Carlo Andreotti | President of the Province of Trentino; 1999-2012 | Succeeded by Alberto Pacher (interim) |
| Preceded by Luis Durnwalder | President of Trentino-Alto Adige; 2011-2013 | Succeeded by Alberto Pacher |
Party political offices
| New title | Civic Choice's leader in the Chamber of Deputies; 2013-present | Incumbent |
