= Lega Trentino =

Political party in Trentino, Italy

- Secretary: Diego Binelli
- Founded: 1990
- Ideology: Regionalism; Federalism; Populism
- National affiliation: Lega Nord (1991–2020); Lega per Salvini Premier (2020–present)
- Provincial Council: 6 / 35
- Chamber of Deputies (Trentino seats): 5 / 7
- Senate (Trentino seats): 0 / 3

Website
- https://www.legasalvinitrentino.it

Lega Trentino (English: League Trentino), whose complete name is Lega Trentino per Salvini Premier (English: League Trentino for Salvini Premier), is a regionalist political party active in Trentino. The party, initially called Lega Nord Trentino (English: Northern League Trentino), was a "national" section of Lega Nord (LN) from 1991 to 2020 and became the regional section of Lega per Salvini Premier (LSP) in Trentino in 2020.

The party is led by Diego Binelli since 2020, first as pro-tempore commissioner and, after the 2024 congress, as secretary. Maurizio Fugatti, who led the party from 2005 to 2018, has been President of Trentino since 2018.

== History ==
The party was founded in 1990 by some Trentino autonomists who wanted to join Lega Nord, as the Trentino Tyrolean Autonomist Party (PATT) had refused to do so. They included Elisabetta Bertotti, Erminio Boso (former member of Integral Autonomy and the PATT), Sergio Divina (former member of the Italian Liberal Party), Sergio Muraro and Alessandro Savoi. Divina was the party's first secretary until 1995, when he was replaced by Savoi.

In the 1992 general election the LNT won 13.9% of the vote, electing Bertotti to the Chamber of Deputies and Boso to the Senate. In the 1993 provincial election the party obtained 16.2% and six regional councillors, including Divina and Muraro. In the 1996 general election the LNT, which had ejected Bertotti for supporting Lorenzo Dellai, the centre-left candidate, for mayor of Trento in 1995, increased its share to 20.8%. Then, the party underwent a period of decline.

For the 2001 general election the LNT, led by Rolando Fontan, joined forces with the PATT. Both Fontan and Denis Bertolini, who successively led the LNT from 1999 to 2003, left the party. The latter launched the alternative United Valleys party, while the former would make a comeback in 2018. However, in 2005 the party elected a long-lasting leadership, formed by Maurizio Fugatti (who would be elected to the Chamber in 2006 and 2008) as secretary and Savoi as president.

In the 2008 provincial election Divina stood for President of Trentino, supported by an autonomist coalition comprising also The People of Freedom (PdL), but was defeated by incumbent Dellai by a landslide. LNT won 18.4% of the vote (combined result of the party's list, 14.1%, and Divina's personal list, 4.3%), passing the PdL (12.3%) in the Province and getting eight deputies elected, six from the party's list and two from Divina's list.

In the 2013 general election the LNT lost its representation in the Chamber, while Divina was re-elected to the Senate as the coalition's best loser, having lost in his single-seat constituency. In the 2013 provincial election Fugatti, deprived of his parliamentary seat, ran for president, winning 6.6% and 6.2% for the party.

In the 2018 general election the party won 26.7% of the vote and obtained a record of five deputies, but no senators.

In the 2018 provincial election the party won 27.1% of the vote and Fugatti was contextually elected President of Trentino with 46.7%.

Following the formation of Lega per Salvini Premier and the 2019 federal congress of the LN, after which the latter became practically inactive, in February 2020 the LNT was re-established as Lega Trentino per Salvini Premier in order to become the regional section of the new party. The founding members of the new LM were Mirko Bisesti, Mara Dalzocchio and Roberto Paccher.

In the run-up of the 2023 provincial election former leader Divina was first suspended from the party for six months and later decided to challenge Fugatti for president of Trentino, opening the way for split within party ranks. In the election, Fugatti was re-elected with 51.8% of the vote, a larger share than in 2018, while Divina obtained a mere 2.2%. The combined score of party list (13.1%) and Fugatti's personal list (10.7%) was 23.8%, a few points down from the 2018 result.

In April 2024 the party held its congress, the first after the party's transformation. Diego Binelli, until then pro-tempore commissioner, was elected secretary, while Savoi was appointed honorary president. In February 2025 Divina joined Forza Italia.

== Popular support ==
Contrarily to other regional sections of Lega Nord, the party usually scores better in general elections than in provincial elections, in which it suffers more competition by other regionalist parties, such as the Trentino Tyrolean Autonomist Party.

The electoral results of Lega Nord Trentino and Lega Trentino in the province of Trentino are shown in the table below.

1992 general	1993 provincial	1994 general	1996 general	1998 provincial	1999 European	2001 general	2003 provincial	2004 European	2006 general	2008 general	2008 provincial
13.9	16.2	12.4	20.8	8.8	4.6	6.1	6.6	6.4	7.9	16.4	18.4 (Note: Combined result of party's official list (14.1%) and Sergio Divina's personal list (4.3%))

2009 European	2013 general	2013 provincial	2014 European	2018 general	2018 provincial	2019 European	2022 general	2023 provincial	2024 European
14.9	7.3	6.2	9.0	26.7	27.1	37.7	11.2	23.8 (Note: Combined result of party's official list (13.1%) and Maurizio Fugatti's personal list (10.7%))	11.5

== Leadership ==
- Secretary: Sergio Divina (1991–1995), Alessandro Savoi (1995–1999), Rolando Fontan (1999–2001), Denis Bertolini (2001–2003), Sergio Divina (2003–2005), Maurizio Fugatti (2005–2018), Mirko Bisesti (2018–2020), Diego Binelli 2020–present, commissioner 2020–2024)
- President: Sergio Muraro (1992–1993), Gianbattista Sordo (1993–1995), Sergio Divina (1995–1999), Marco Tomasi (1999–2001), Lorenzo Conci (2001–2003), Alessandro Savoi (2005–2020)
- Honorary President: Alessandro Savoi (2024–present)

== Gallery ==
Flag of Trentino proposed by Lega Nord
