= Daisy Civic List =

Daisy Civic List Civica Margherita
- Leader: Lorenzo Dellai, Giorgio Lunelli
- Founded: 1998
- Dissolved: 2008+
- Merger of: Italian People's Party; Italian Renewal; United Christian Democrats
- Succeeded by: Union for Trentino (de facto)
- Ideology: Regionalism; Christian democracy
- Political position: Centre

The Daisy Civic List (Italian: Civica Margherita) was a regionalist, Christian democratic, centrist Italian political party active in Trentino.

== History ==
It was founded in 1998 by Lorenzo Dellai and other local politicians active in several centrist parties, both from the centre-left and the centre-right at the national level, as the Italian People's Party, Italian Renewal, the United Christian Democrats and splinters from the Christian Democratic Centre.

In the 1998 provincial election the Civica won 22.0% of the vote and Dellai was appointed President of the province of Trento, at the head of a centre-left coalition, along with two major allies: the Democrats of the Left (DS) and the Trentino Tyrolean Autonomist Party (PATT).

Taking example from Trentino and bordering Veneto, where Massimo Cacciari formed a similar list named Together for Veneto for the 2000 regional election, four centre-left parties united to form Democracy is Freedom – The Daisy (DL) in 2001. Since that moment, the Daisy Civic List became the provincial section of the national party with the similar name, although maintaining some of its autonomy and peculiarities. In particular it was more conservative than the national DL, because of its explicit characterization as a Christian-democratic party.

In the 2003 provincial election the party won 25.9% of the vote and its leader Lorenzo Dellai was re-elected by a landslide: 60.8% compared to 30.7% of his major opponent, Carlo Andreotti.

In 2007, when DL merged with the DS, although most of the members of the Daisy Civic List joined the new Democratic Party (PD), they rejected the merge at the regional level, where Civica and the DS continued to act as distinct parties.

In 2008 Trentino centrists decided to retain a double party affiliation: to the PD at the national level, to the Daisy at the regional one, and Giorgio Lunelli, the party coordinator, declared that the Daisy would not join the Democratic Party "neither today, nor after the [provincial] election, never".

After the defeat of the centre-left in Trentino in the 2008 general election, Daisy was divided among those who wanted to continue on the road toward the consolidation of the regional party and those who wanted to establish the provincial PD along with the local Democrats of the Left. On 30 April the party decided both the merger into PD and the creation of a new regional party federated with it, as supported by both Dellai and Lunelli.

Daisy thus suffered the separation of the "Democrats" from the "regionalists". Dellai, Lunelli, supported by former Senator Mauro Betta and eight provincial deputies out of twelve, decided to take part to the foundation of the regionalist party, while Senator Claudio Molinari and Deputy Letizia De Torre decided to join the PD. The new regionalist party, named Union for Trentino (UpT), was launched on 7 June, while the provincial PD was established on 8 June. With the foundation of UpT the Daisy ceased to exist.

== Popular support ==
The electoral results of the Civica in the province of Bolzano since 1998 are shown in the table below.

1998 provinc.	1999 European	2001 general	2003 provinc.	2004 European	2006 general	2008 general
22.0	20.9	16.7	25.9	-	-	-

== Sources ==
- Provincial Council of Trento – Legislatures
- Trentino Alto-Adige Region – Elections
- Provincial Government of Trento – Elections
- Cattaneo Institute – Archive of Election Data
- Parties and Elections in Europe – Province of Trento
- Ministry of the Interior – Historical Archive of Elections
