= Arno Kompatscher =

Italian politician (born 1971)

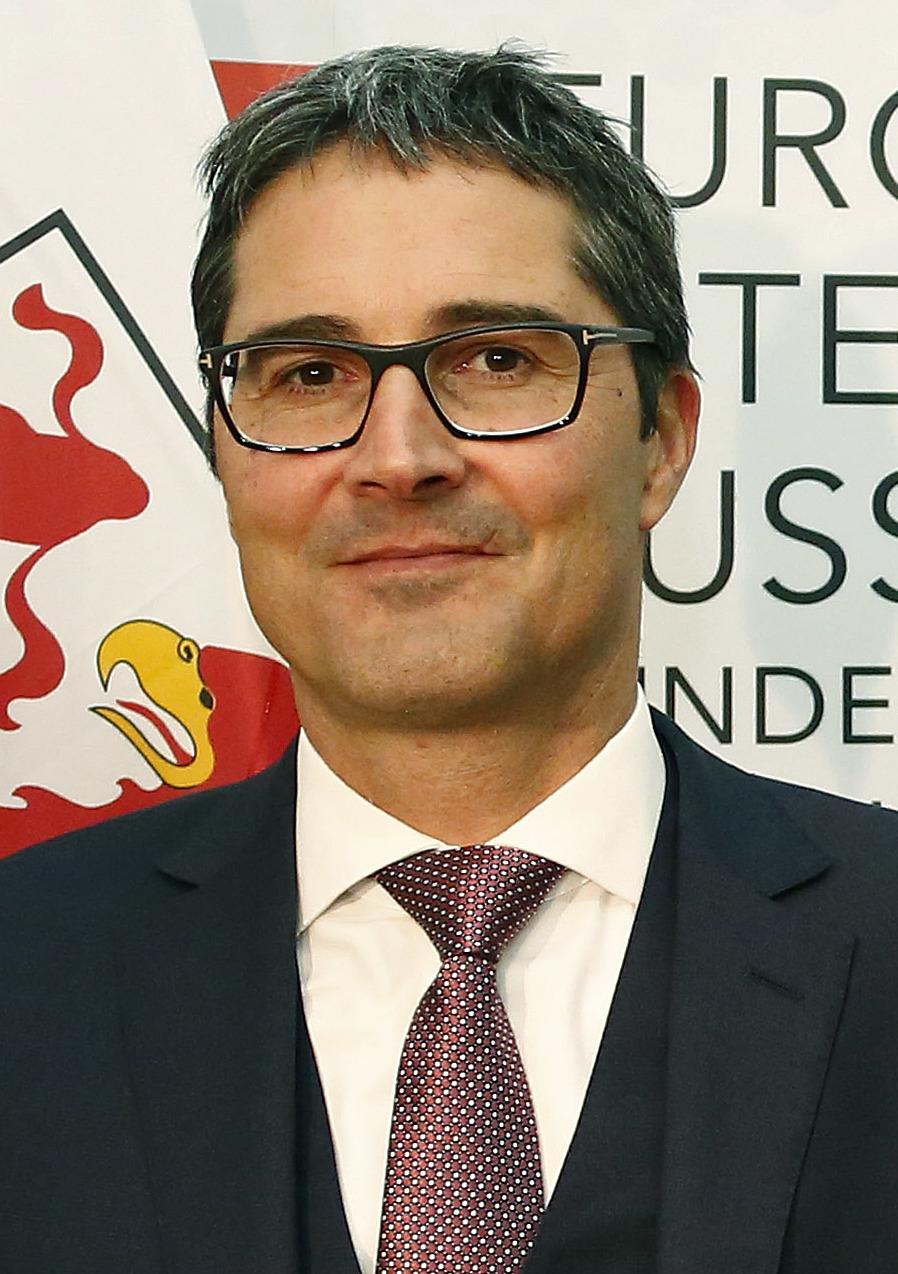
- Kompatscher in 2015

Governor of South Tyrol
- Incumbent
- Assumed office 9 January 2014
- Preceded by: Luis Durnwalder

President of Trentino-Alto Adige/Südtirol
- Incumbent
- Assumed office 13 March 2024
- Preceded by: Maurizio Fugatti
- In office 15 June 2016 – 7 July 2021
- Preceded by: Ugo Rossi
- Succeeded by: Maurizio Fugatti

Personal details
- Born: 19 March 1971 (age 55) Völs am Schlern, South Tyrol, Italy
- Party: SVP

Arno Kompatscher (Austrian German pronunciation: [ˈarno ˈkɔmpatʃɐ]; born 19 March 1971) is an Italian politician and governor of South Tyrol. He is the incumbent president of Trentino-Alto Adige/Südtirol, serving his second term non-consecutively since 13 March 2024. He previously served as the president of Trentino-Alto Adige/Südtirol from 15 June 2016 to 7 July 2021.

== Biography ==
Kompatscher was born in Völs am Schlern, South Tyrol. After compulsory military service in the Italian Army Alpini corps, he studied law at the University of Innsbruck and the University of Padua. In 2000 he was elected deputy-mayor of his hometown and in 2005 he was elected mayor, and he was reelected in 2010.

In 2013, he won the South Tyrolean People's Party (SVP) primary, becoming the lead candidate for the 2013 provincial elections. The provincial elections on 27 October 2013 were won by the SVP which received 131,236 votes (45.7%). Kompatscher received the most preference votes of all candidates elected to the provincial legislature with 81,107 from the SVP voters. He was reelected in 2019 and in 2023.
