= Maurizio Fugatti =

Italian politician (born 1972)

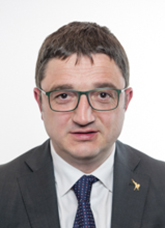

President of Trentino
- Incumbent
- Assumed office 2 November 2018
- Preceded by: Ugo Rossi

President of Trentino-Alto Adige/Südtirol
- In office 7 July 2021 – 13 March 2024
- Preceded by: Arno Kompatscher
- Succeeded by: Arno Kompatscher

Member of the Chamber of Deputies
- In office 23 March 2018 – 9 January 2019
- In office 28 April 2006 – 14 March 2013
- Constituency: Pergine Valsugana (2018)

Personal details
- Born: 7 April 1972 (age 54) Bussolengo, Italy
- Party: League
- Education: University of Bologna
- Occupation: Chartered accountant, banking consultant

Maurizio Fugatti (born 7 April 1972) is an Italian politician from the League party. He was a member of the Chamber of Deputies from 2006 to 2013 and again from 2018 to 2019. He has been president of the Autonomous Province of Trentino since 2 November 2018.

== Biography ==
Maurizio Fugatti was born in Bussolengo, Verona, but lives in Avio (Trentino). He graduated in political science at the University of Bologna and is a chartered accountant by profession.

Fugatti first entered the Chamber of Deputies after the 2006 Italian general election, serving as part of the 15th Legislature. He was reelected in 2008, being a part of the 16th Legislature until it expired on 14 March 2013. Fugatti was not reelected in the 2013 Italian general election.

He was a member of the Provincial Council of Trentino from 22 November 2013 to 10 April 2018. In the 2018 election, Fugatti was elected to the Chamber of Deputies for a third time, with 44.56% of the vote. He took office as member of the Chamber of Deputies on 23 March, and resigned as member of the Provincial Council on 10 April. Fugatti sat in the 18th Legislature for a constituency of Pergine Valsugana [it].

He served as Undersecretary at the Ministry of the Health in the Conte I Cabinet from 13 June 2018 to 9 November 2018.

Fugatti was elected President of Trentino in the 2018 provincial election. He won 46.74% of the vote, and took office on 2 November 2018. Fugatti resigned from his post as member of the Chamber of Deputies, effective 9 January 2019.
