= Elections in Trentino-Alto Adige/Südtirol =

Political elections for public offices in Trentino-Alto Adige/Südtirol

This page gathers the results of elections in Trentino-Alto Adige/Südtirol.

== Regional/provincial elections ==
Since 2003, after a constitutional reform enacted in 2001 (see 2001 Italian constitutional referendum), regional elections in Trentino-Alto Adige/Südtirol are nothing more than two separate provincial elections. The regional government has since not provided regionwide vote totals anymore.

=== Latest provincial elections ===
==== Trentino ====
2023 Trentino provincial election results
Candidates	Votes	%	Seats	Parties	Votes	%	Seats	+/−
Maurizio Fugatti	129,758	51.82	1					
Maurizio Fugatti	129,758	51.82	1	Trentino League	30,347	13.05	5	–8
Maurizio Fugatti	129,758	51.82	1	Brothers of Italy	28,714	12.35	5	+4
Maurizio Fugatti	129,758	51.82	1	Fugatti for President	24,953	10.73	4	New
Maurizio Fugatti	129,758	51.82	1	Trentino Tyrolean Autonomist Party	19,011	8.18	3	–3
Maurizio Fugatti	129,758	51.82	1	La Civica	11,285	4.85	2	±0
Maurizio Fugatti	129,758	51.82	1	Forza Italia	4,708	2.02	0	–1
Maurizio Fugatti	129,758	51.82	1	Fassa Association	2,018	0.87	1	±0
Maurizio Fugatti	129,758	51.82	1	Union of the Centre	1,362	0.59	0	±0
Maurizio Fugatti	129,758	51.82	1	Total	122,398	52.64	20	–4
Francesco Valduga	93,888	37.50	1					
Francesco Valduga	93,888	37.50	1	Democratic Party	38,689	16.64	7	+3
Francesco Valduga	93,888	37.50	1	Campobase	19,553	8.41	3	+2
Francesco Valduga	93,888	37.50	1	Autonomy House	9,968	4.29	1	New
Francesco Valduga	93,888	37.50	1	Greens and Left Alliance	7,565	3.25	1	+1
Francesco Valduga	93,888	37.50	1	Fascegn	3,634	1.56	0	±0
Francesco Valduga	93,888	37.50	1	Italia Viva	3,399	1.46	0	New
Francesco Valduga	93,888	37.50	1	Action	3,302	1.42	0	New
Francesco Valduga	93,888	37.50	1	Total	86,110	37.03	12	+5
Filippo Degasperi	9,533	3.81	1					
Filippo Degasperi	9,533	3.81	1	Wave	5,864	2.52	0	New
Filippo Degasperi	9,533	3.81	1	My Valley	1,204	0.52	0	New
Filippo Degasperi	9,533	3.81	1	People's Union	1,088	0.47	0	±0
Filippo Degasperi	9,533	3.81	1	Total	8,156	3.51	0	—
Marco Rizzo	5,651	2.26	0	Sovereign Popular Democracy	5,457	2.35	0	New
Sergio Divina	5,558	2.22	0					
Sergio Divina	5,558	2.22	0	Popular Alternative	2,261	0.97	0	New
Sergio Divina	5,558	2.22	0	Us with Divina for President	1,845	0.79	0	New
Sergio Divina	5,558	2.22	0	Youth for Divina	642	0.28	0	New
Sergio Divina	5,558	2.22	0	Total	4,748	2.04	0	—
Alex Marini	4,796	1.92	0	Five Star Movement	4,523	1.95	0	–1
Elena Dardo	1,205	0.48	0	Alternative	1,121	0.48	0	New
Total candidates	250,389	100	3	Total parties	232,513	100	32	±0
Source: Autonomous Province of Trento

==== South Tyrol ====
Party	Votes	%	Seats	+/–
South Tyrolean People's Party	97,092	34.53	13	−2
Team K	31,201	11.09	4	−2
South Tyrolean Freedom	30,583	10.88	4	+2
Greens	25,445	9.05	3	±0
Brothers of Italy	16,747	5.96	2	+1
JWA List	16,596	5.90	2	New
Die Freiheitlichen	13,836	4.92	2	±0
Democratic Party	9,707	3.45	1	±0
For South Tyrol with Widmann	9,646	3.43	1	±0
League–United for Alto Adige	8,541	3.04	1	−3
La Civica	7,301	2.60	1	New
Vita	7,222	2.57	1	New
Five Star Movement	2,086	0.74	–	−1
Enzian	1,990	0.71	–	New
Forza Italia	1,625	0.58	–	±0
Centre-Right	1,601	0.57	–	New
Total	281,219	100.00	35	–
Valid votes	281,219	96.87		
Invalid/blank votes	9,080	3.13		
Total votes	290,299	100.00		
Registered voters/turnout	429,841	67.54		
Source: Official Results

Popular vote
SVP	34.53%
TK	11.09%
STF	10.88%
Grüne	9.05%
FdI	5.96%
JWA	5.90%
dF	4.92%
PD	3.45%
Widmann	3.43%
Lega	3.04%
Civica	2.60%
Vita	2.57%
M5S	0.74%
Enzian	0.71%
FI	0.58%
CD	0.57%

=== List of previous regional/provincial elections ===
- 1948 Trentino-Alto Adige/Südtirol regional election
- 1952 Trentino-Alto Adige/Südtirol regional election
- 1956 Trentino-Alto Adige/Südtirol regional election
- 1960 Trentino-Alto Adige/Südtirol regional election
- 1964 Trentino-Alto Adige/Südtirol regional election
- 1968 Trentino-Alto Adige/Südtirol regional election
- 1973 Trentino-Alto Adige/Südtirol regional election
- 1978 Trentino-Alto Adige/Südtirol regional election
- 1983 Trentino-Alto Adige/Südtirol regional election
- 1988 Trentino-Alto Adige/Südtirol regional election
- 1993 Trentino-Alto Adige/Südtirol regional election
- 1998 Trentino-Alto Adige/Südtirol regional election
- 2003 Trentino-Alto Adige/Südtirol provincial elections
- 2008 Trentino-Alto Adige/Südtirol provincial elections
- 2013 Trentino-Alto Adige/Südtirol provincial elections
- 2018 Trentino-Alto Adige/Südtirol provincial elections

== Italian general elections ==
=== Latest general election ===
==== Chamber of Deputies ====
Coalition	Party	Proportional			First-past-the-post			Total seats
Coalition	Party	Votes	%	Seats	Votes	%	Seats	Total seats
Centre-right coalition	Brothers of Italy	94,824	18.76	1	157,622	31.18	1	2
Centre-right coalition	Lega (incl. LT, LAAST, Fassa)	16,302	11.84	0	157,622	31.18	1	1
Centre-right coalition	Forza Italia	6,582	4.78	0	157,622	31.18	0	0
Centre-right coalition	Us Moderates	987	0.72	0	157,622	31.18	0	0
Centre-left coalition	Democratic Party – Democratic and Progressive Italy	86,371	17.09	1	132,938	26.30	0	1
Centre-left coalition	Greens and Left Alliance (incl. Greens)	29,594	5.85	0	132,938	26.30	0	0
Centre-left coalition	More Europe (incl. Team K)	14,911	2.95	0	132,938	26.30	0	0
Centre-left coalition	Civic Commitment	2,062	0.41	0	132,938	26.30	0	0
SVP–PATT (incl. PT)		117,010	23.15	1	117,010	23.15	2	3
Action – Italia Viva		30,678	6.07	0	30,678	6.07	0	0
Five Star Movement		25,394	5.02	0	25,394	5.02	0	0
Vita (incl. Enzian)		22,331	4.42	0	22,331	4.42	0	0
Italexit		8,754	1.73	0	8,754	1.73	0	0
Sovereign and Popular Italy		6,426	1.27	0	6,426	1.27	0	0
People's Union		4,331	0.86	0	4,331	0.86	0	0
Total		505,484	100.00	3	505,484	100.00	4	7

Source: Ministry of the Interior

PR vote in Trentino

Party	Votes	%
Brothers of Italy	69,773	25.21
PD–IDP	61,760	22.31
Lega (incl. LT, Fassa)	30,978	11.19
Action – Italia Viva	23,540	8.50
Five Star Movement	16,686	6.03
SVP–PATT (incl. PT)	16,177	5.84
Forza Italia	12,813	4.63
Greens and Left Alliance	11,991	4.33
More Europe	9,695	3.50
Italexit	6,337	2.29
Vita	5,843	2.11
Sovereign and Popular Italy	5,093	1.84
People's Union	3,022	1.09
Us Moderates	2,006	0.72
Civic Commitment	1,096	0.40
Total	276,810	100.00
Valid votes	276,810	95.30
Invalid/blank votes	13,648	4.70
Total votes	290,458	100.00
Registered voters/turnout	417,154	69.63
Source: Ministry of the Interior

PR vote in South Tyrol

Party	Votes	%
SVP–PATT	100,833	44.09
Brothers of Italy	25,051	10.95
PD–IDP	24,611	10.76
Greens and Left Alliance (incl. Greens)	17,603	7.70
Vita (incl. Enzian)	16,488	7.21
Lega (incl. LAAST)	12,130	5.30
Five Star Movement	8,708	3.81
Action – Italia Viva	7,138	3.12
More Europe (incl. Team K)	5,216	2.28
Forza Italia	4,116	1.80
Italexit	2,417	1.06
Sovereign and Popular Italy	1,333	0.58
People's Union	1,309	0.57
Civic Commitment	966	0.42
Us Moderates	755	0.33
Total	228,674	100.00
Valid votes	228,674	93.28
Invalid/blank votes	16,462	6.72
Total votes	245,136	100.00
Registered voters/turnout	393,852	62.24
Source: Ministry of the Interior

==== Senate of the Republic ====
Party	Votes	%	Seats
Centre-right	137,015	27.24	2
SVP–PATT (incl. PT)	116,003	23.06	2
CB – +E – AVS – PD–IDP – A–IV	100,602	20.00	1
Five Star Movement	28,355	5.64	–
PD–IDP – +E – AVS	21,894	4.35	1
Vita (incl. Enzian)	17,876	3.55	–
AVS (incl. Greens)	17,574	3.49	–
ISP	15,252	3.03	–
Die Freiheitlichen	14,479	2.88	–
Team K	11,157	2.22	–
PD–IDP	9,612	1.91	–
Action – Italia Viva	6,782	1.35	–
UP	6,353	1.26	–
Total	502,954	100.00	6
Valid votes	502,954	93.91	
Invalid/blank votes	32,625	6.09	
Total votes	535,579	100.00	
Registered voters/turnout	811,006	66.04	
Source: Ministry of the Interior

Vote in Trentino

Party	Votes	%	Seats
Centre-right	103,594	38.37	2
Centre-left (Note: CB – +E – AVS – PD–IDP – A–IV)	100,602	37.26	1
SVP–PATT (incl. PT)	24,709	9.15	–
Five Star Movement	19,206	7.11	–
ISP	13,595	5.03	–
UP	5,214	1.93	–
Vita	3,092	1.15	–
Total	270,012	100.00	3
Valid votes	270,012	92.96	
Invalid/blank votes	20,435	7.04	
Total votes	290,447	100.00	
Registered voters/turnout	417,154	69.63	
Source: Ministry of the Interior

Vote in South Tyrol

Party	Votes	%	Seats
SVP–PATT	91,294	39.19	2
Centre-right	33,421	14.35	–
Centre-left (Note: PD–IDP – +E – AVS)	21,894	9.40	1
AVS (incl. Greens)	17,574	7.54	–
Vita (incl. Enzian)	14,784	6.35	–
Die Freiheitlichen	14,479	6.22	–
Team K	11,157	4.79	–
PD–IDP	9,612	4.13	–
Five Star Movement	9,149	3.93	–
Action – Italia Viva	6,782	2.91	–
ISP	1,657	0.71	–
UP	1,139	0.49	–
Total	232,942	100.00	3
Valid votes	232,942	95.03	
Invalid/blank votes	12,190	4.97	
Total votes	245,132	100.00	
Registered voters/turnout	393,852	62.24	
Source: Ministry of the Interior

=== List of previous general elections ===
- 1946 Italian general election in Trentino-Alto Adige/Südtirol
- 1948 Italian general election in Trentino-Alto Adige/Südtirol
- 1953 Italian general election in Trentino-Alto Adige/Südtirol
- 1958 Italian general election in Trentino-Alto Adige/Südtirol
- 1963 Italian general election in Trentino-Alto Adige/Südtirol
- 1968 Italian general election in Trentino-Alto Adige/Südtirol
- 1972 Italian general election in Trentino-Alto Adige/Südtirol
- 1976 Italian general election in Trentino-Alto Adige/Südtirol
- 1979 Italian general election in Trentino-Alto Adige/Südtirol
- 1983 Italian general election in Trentino-Alto Adige/Südtirol
- 1987 Italian general election in Trentino-Alto Adige/Südtirol
- 1992 Italian general election in Trentino-Alto Adige/Südtirol
- 1994 Italian general election in Trentino-Alto Adige/Südtirol
- 1996 Italian general election in Trentino-Alto Adige/Südtirol
- 2001 Italian general election in Trentino-Alto Adige/Südtirol
- 2006 Italian general election in Trentino-Alto Adige/Südtirol
- 2008 Italian general election in Trentino-Alto Adige/Südtirol
- 2013 Italian general election in Trentino-Alto Adige/Südtirol
- 2018 Italian general election in Trentino-Alto Adige/Südtirol

== European Parliament elections ==
=== Latest EP election ===
Party	Votes	%
South Tyrolean People's Party (incl. PATT)	106,561	26.53
Brothers of Italy	78,553	19.56
Democratic Party	63,690	15.86
Greens and Left Alliance (incl. Grüne)	47,189	11.75
Lega (incl. LT, LAAST)	30,248	7.53
Action (incl. TK, CA)	22,727	5.66
Forza Italia	14,058	3.50
Five Star Movement	13,357	3.33
United States of Europe	10,638	2.65
Peace Land Dignity	9,189	2.29
Freedom	3,856	0.96
Popular Alternative	1,635	0.41
Total	401,701	100.00
Valid votes	401,701	96.48
Invalid/blank votes	14,674	3.52
Total votes	416,375	100.00
Registered voters/turnout	886,654	46.96
Source: Ministry of the Interior

Trentino

Party	Votes	%
Brothers of Italy	54,280	26.34
Democratic Party	51,952	25.21
Lega (incl. LT)	23,786	11.54
Greens and Left Alliance	16,323	7.92
South Tyrolean People's Party (incl. PATT)	14,712	7.14
Forza Italia	10,289	4.99
Action (incl. CA)	9,335	4.53
Five Star Movement	9,176	4.45
United States of Europe	7,858	3.81
Peace Land Dignity	6,214	3.01
Freedom	1,594	0.77
Popular Alternative	591	0.29
Total	206,110	100.00
Valid votes	206,110	96.77
Invalid/blank votes	6,883	3.23
Total votes	212,993	100.00
Registered voters/turnout	476,223	44.73
Source: Ministry of the Interior

South Tyrol

Party	Votes	%
South Tyrolean People's Party	91,849	46.96
Greens and Left Alliance (incl. Grüne)	30,866	15.78
Brothers of Italy	24,273	12.41
Action (incl. TK)	13,392	6.85
Democratic Party	11,738	6.00
Lega (incl. LAAST)	6,462	3.30
Five Star Movement	4,181	2.14
Forza Italia	3,769	1.93
Peace Land Dignity	2,975	1.52
United States of Europe	2,780	1.42
Freedom	2,262	1.16
Popular Alternative	1,044	0.53
Total	195,591	100.00
Valid votes	195,591	96.17
Invalid/blank votes	7,791	3.83
Total votes	203,382	100.00
Registered voters/turnout	410,431	49.55
Source: Ministry of the Interior

=== List of previous EP elections ===
- 1979 European Parliament election in Trentino-Alto Adige/Südtirol
- 1984 European Parliament election in Trentino-Alto Adige/Südtirol
- 1989 European Parliament election in Trentino-Alto Adige/Südtirol
- 1994 European Parliament election in Trentino-Alto Adige/Südtirol
- 1999 European Parliament election in Trentino-Alto Adige/Südtirol
- 2004 European Parliament election in Trentino-Alto Adige/Südtirol
- 2009 European Parliament election in Trentino-Alto Adige/Südtirol
- 2014 European Parliament election in Trentino-Alto Adige/Südtirol
- 2019 European Parliament election in Trentino-Alto Adige/Südtirol
