= 2024 European Parliament election in Trentino-Alto Adige/Südtirol =

The European Parliament election of 2024 took place in Trentino-Alto Adige/Südtirol, as well as the rest of Italy, on 8–9 June 2024.

The Brothers of Italy, which came first also at the country-level, was by the most voted list in Trentino (26.3%), while the South Tyrolean People's Party as by far the largest party in South Tyrol (47.0%). SVP's Herbert Dorfmann, the outgoing three-term MEP, was largely the most voted candidate in the region (80,173 preference votes), followed by Brigitte Foppa of the Greens–Greens and Left Alliance (25,390). Dorfmann was the only candidate from the region to be elected (in his case, re-elected) to the European Parliament.

== Background ==
Of the two provinces forming Trentino-Alto Adige/Südtirol, Trentino was dominated by an autonomist centre-left coalition from the 1998 provincial election to the 2018 provincial election, while South Tyrol by the South Tyrolean People's Party (SVP). The latter and its sister-party in Trentino, the Trentino Tyrolean Autonomist Party (PATT), were frequent allies of the Democratic Party, both at the provincial level and countrywide. However, after the 2018 provincial elections, the SVP slowly aligned with the centre-right coalition and the PATT did the same since the 2023 provincial election.

In the run-up of the election, the SVP and the PATT confirmed their electoral pact with Forza Italia, that had been first signed five years before due to their common affiliation with the European People's Party. Even though Die Freiheitlichen announced their candidacy in April 2024, they did not submit a symbol the same month.

== Results ==
Party	Votes	%
South Tyrolean People's Party (incl. PATT)	106,561	26.53
Brothers of Italy	78,553	19.56
Democratic Party	63,690	15.86
Greens and Left Alliance (incl. Grüne)	47,189	11.75
Lega (incl. LT, LAAST)	30,248	7.53
Action (incl. TK, CA)	22,727	5.66
Forza Italia	14,058	3.50
Five Star Movement	13,357	3.33
United States of Europe	10,638	2.65
Peace Land Dignity	9,189	2.29
Freedom	3,856	0.96
Popular Alternative	1,635	0.41
Total	401,701	100.00
Valid votes	401,701	96.48
Invalid/blank votes	14,674	3.52
Total votes	416,375	100.00
Registered voters/turnout	886,654	46.96
Source: Ministry of the Interior

Trentino

Party	Votes	%
Brothers of Italy	54,280	26.34
Democratic Party	51,952	25.21
Lega (incl. LT)	23,786	11.54
Greens and Left Alliance	16,323	7.92
South Tyrolean People's Party (incl. PATT)	14,712	7.14
Forza Italia	10,289	4.99
Action (incl. CA)	9,335	4.53
Five Star Movement	9,176	4.45
United States of Europe	7,858	3.81
Peace Land Dignity	6,214	3.01
Freedom	1,594	0.77
Popular Alternative	591	0.29
Total	206,110	100.00
Valid votes	206,110	96.77
Invalid/blank votes	6,883	3.23
Total votes	212,993	100.00
Registered voters/turnout	476,223	44.73
Source: Ministry of the Interior

South Tyrol

Party	Votes	%
South Tyrolean People's Party	91,849	46.96
Greens and Left Alliance (incl. Grüne)	30,866	15.78
Brothers of Italy	24,273	12.41
Action (incl. TK)	13,392	6.85
Democratic Party	11,738	6.00
Lega (incl. LAAST)	6,462	3.30
Five Star Movement	4,181	2.14
Forza Italia	3,769	1.93
Peace Land Dignity	2,975	1.52
United States of Europe	2,780	1.42
Freedom	2,262	1.16
Popular Alternative	1,044	0.53
Total	195,591	100.00
Valid votes	195,591	96.17
Invalid/blank votes	7,791	3.83
Total votes	203,382	100.00
Registered voters/turnout	410,431	49.55
Source: Ministry of the Interior
