= 1999 European Parliament election in Trentino-Alto Adige/Südtirol =

The European Parliament election of 1999 took place in Trentino-Alto Adige/Südtirol, as well as the rest of Italy, on 13 June 1999.

Unlike previous elections, the South Tyrolean People's Party did not run with a Christian Democratic party, the SVP formed an apparentment with The Democrats. All heirs of the Christian Democracy (PPI, CCD, CDU and UDEUR) fell below 1% in South Tyrol. Italian Renewal fell from 8.9% in 1996 to mere 0.4% in the region.

== Results ==
=== Regional level ===
Party	Votes	%
South Tyrolean People's Party (incl. PATT)	146,459	30.87
Forza Italia	80,190	16.90
Bonino List	40,097	8.45
Democrats of the Left	34,255	7.22
The Democrats	33,018	6.96
Segni Pact – National Alliance	27,843	5.87
Federation of the Greens (incl. Grüne)	23,894	5.04
Liga Veneta Repubblica–UfS–others	17,608	3.71
Italian People's Party	15,515	3.27
Lega Nord (incl. LNT–LAAST)	11,539	2.43
Communist Refoundation Party	8,318	1.75
Christian Democratic Centre	7,996	1.69
United Christian Democrats	7,026	1.48
Tricolour Flame (incl. Unitalia)	4,134	0.87
Pensioners' Party	3,950	0.83
Italian Democratic Socialists	3,621	0.76
Party of Italian Communists	2,746	0.58
Italian Renewal	2,020	0.43
PSd'Az–VNE–CI	1,681	0.35
PRI–FdL	1,588	0.33
Union of Democrats for Europe	615	0.13
Southern Action League	301	0.06
Total	474,414	100.00
Valid votes	474,414	92.85
Invalid/blank votes	36,521	7.15
Total votes	510,935	100.00
Registered voters/turnout	750,472	68.08
Source: Ministry of the Interior

=== Provincial level ===
==== Trentino ====
Party	Votes	%
Forza Italia	59,517	26.45
Bonino List	26,741	11.88
Democrats of the Left	25,981	11.55
The Democrats	25,682	11.41
Segni Pact – National Alliance	14,251	6.33
Italian People's Party	13,404	5.96
Lega Nord (incl. LNT)	10,331	4.59
Christian Democratic Centre	7,088	3.15
Federation of the Greens	7,064	3.14
South Tyrolean People's Party (PATT)	6,427	2.86
United Christian Democrats	6,012	2.67
Communist Refoundation Party	6,002	2.67
Pensioners' Party	3,028	1.35
Italian Democratic Socialists	2,963	1.32
Party of Italian Communists	1,942	0.86
Tricolour Flame	1,758	0.78
Liga Veneta Repubblica–UfS–others	1,719	0.76
Italian Renewal	1,538	0.68
PSd'Az–VNE–CI	1,534	0.68
PRI–FdL	1,404	0.62
Union of Democrats for Europe	343	0.15
Southern Action League	296	0.13
Total	225,025	100.00
Valid votes	225,025	91.92
Invalid/blank votes	19,789	8.08
Total votes	244,814	100.00
Registered voters/turnout	388,882	62.95
Source: Ministry of the Interior

==== South Tyrol ====
Some politicians of regional parties ran on the lists: Reinhold Messner (Grüne for FdV), Eva Klotz (Union for South Tyrol for LVR) and Donato Seppi (Unitalia for MSFT) who all became the most voted persons in the regions of their list.

Party	Votes	%
South Tyrolean People's Party	139,878	56.05
Forza Italia	20,594	8.25
Federation of the Greens (incl. Grüne)	16,770	6.72
Liga Veneta Repubblica–UfS–others	15,847	6.35
Segni Pact – National Alliance	13,631	5.46
Bonino List	13,294	5.33
Democrats of the Left	8,382	3.36
The Democrats	7,252	2.91
Tricolour Flame (incl. Unitalia)	2,410	0.97
Communist Refoundation Party	2,403	0.96
Italian People's Party	2,061	0.83
Lega Nord (incl. LAAST)	1,234	0.49
United Christian Democrats	1,037	0.42
Christian Democratic Centre	968	0.39
Pensioners' Party	942	0.38
Party of Italian Communists	806	0.32
Italian Democratic Socialists	673	0.27
Italian Renewal	488	0.20
Union of Democrats for Europe	307	0.12
PRI–FdL	191	0.08
PSd'Az–VNE–CI	307	0.12
Southern Action League	102	0.04
Total	249,577	100.00
Valid votes	249,577	93.73
Invalid/blank votes	16,707	6.27
Total votes	266,284	100.00
Registered voters/turnout	361,590	73.64
Source: Ministry of the Interior
