= 1994 Italian general election in Trentino-Alto Adige/Südtirol =

The 1994 Italian general election took place on 27 March 1994. In Trentino-Alto Adige/Südtirol, 17 seats were up for election: 10 for the Chamber of Deputies and 7 for the Senate of the Republic.

The Italian People's Party (PPI), Democratic Party of the Left (PDS) and Grüne formed a coalition called Autonomist Democratic Aggregation in South Tyrol.

== Results ==
=== Full results ===
==== Chamber of Deputies ====
FPTP
Party	Votes	%	Seats
SVP/PATT	246,979	40.06	3
Pole of Freedoms	127,847	20.74	4
Pact for Italy	70,346	11.41	0
National Alliance	62,022	10.06	1
Progressives	57,925	9.39	0
ADA (incl. PDS, PPI, Grüne)	45,409	7.36	0
Natural Law Party	6,046	0.98	0
Total	616,574	100.00	8
Valid votes	616,574	91.35	
Invalid/blank votes	58,410	8.65	
Total votes	674,984	100.00	
Registered voters/turnout	744,450	90.67	
Source: Ministry of the Interior

Party vote
Party	Votes	%	Seats
South Tyrolean People's Party (incl. PATT)	231,842	36.77	0
Forza Italia	98,203	15.58	1
Italian People's Party	73,245	11.62	1
National Alliance	56,590	8.98	0
Lega Nord (LNAAST–LNT)	47,572	7.55	0
Democratic Party of the Left	41,645	6.61	0
Federation of the Greens (incl. VGV)	28,214	4.48	0
The Network	15,954	2.53	0
Communist Refoundation Party	14,406	2.29	0
Autonomist Democratic Aggregation	12,898	2.05	0
Italian Socialist Party	5,675	0.90	0
Natural Law Party	4,215	0.67	0
Total	630,459	100.00	2
Valid votes	630,459	93.44	
Invalid/blank votes	44,259	6.56	
Total votes	674,718	100.00	
Registered voters/turnout	744,450	90.63	
Source: Ministry of the Interior

===== Trentino =====
FPTP
Party	Votes	%	Seats
Pole of Freedoms	105,038	33.16	4
Pact for Italy	70,346	22.21	0
PATT	58,962	18.61	0
Progressives	57,925	18.29	0
National Alliance	23,709	7.48	0
Natural Law Party	780	0.25	0
Total	316,760	100.00	4
Valid votes	316,760	92.11	
Invalid/blank votes	27,136	7.89	
Total votes	343,896	100.00	
Registered voters/turnout	382,424	89.93	
Source: Ministry of the Interior

Party vote
Party	Votes	%
Forza Italia	71,659	22.34
Italian People's Party	65,507	20.42
South Tyrolean People's Party (PATT)	45,515	14.19
Lega Nord (LNT)	40,064	12.49
Democratic Party of the Left	30,928	9.64
National Alliance	22,403	6.98
The Network	14,313	4.46
Federation of the Greens	12,343	3.85
Communist Refoundation Party	11,213	3.50
Italian Socialist Party	4,312	1.34
Natural Law Party	1,602	0.50
Autonomist Democratic Aggregation	965	0.30
Total	320,824	100.00
Valid votes	320,824	93.33
Invalid/blank votes	22,924	6.67
Total votes	343,748	100.00
Registered voters/turnout	382,424	89.89
Source: Ministry of the Interior

===== South Tyrol =====
FPTP
Party	Votes	%	Seats
South Tyrolean People's Party	188,017	62.71	3
ADA (incl. PDS, PPI, Grüne)	45,409	15.15	0
National Alliance	38,313	12.78	1
Pole of Freedoms	22,809	7.61	0
Natural Law Party	5,266	1.76	0
Total	299,814	100.00	4
Valid votes	299,814	90.55	
Invalid/blank votes	31,274	9.45	
Total votes	331,088	100.00	
Registered voters/turnout	362,026	91.45	
Source: Ministry of the Interior

Party vote
Party	Votes	%
South Tyrolean People's Party	186,311	60.15
National Alliance	34,212	11.05
Forza Italia	26,587	8.58
Federation of the Greens (VGV)	15,890	5.13
Autonomist Democratic Aggregation	11,946	3.86
Democratic Party of the Left	10,689	3.45
Italian People's Party	7,749	2.50
Lega Nord (LNAAST)	7,508	2.42
Communist Refoundation Party	3,288	1.06
The Network	1,621	0.52
Italian Socialist Party	1,332	0.43
Natural Law Party	2,611	0.84
Total	309,744	100.00
Valid votes	309,744	93.56
Invalid/blank votes	21,336	6.44
Total votes	331,080	100.00
Registered voters/turnout	362,026	91.45
Source: Ministry of the Interior

==== Senate of the Republic ====
Party	Votes	%	Seats
SVP (incl. PATT)	217,137	40.24	3
Pole of Freedoms	107,656	19.95	3
Pact for Italy	61,259	11.35	1
Progressives	59,246	10.98	0
National Alliance	53,389	9.90	0
ADA (incl. PDS, PPI, Grüne)	34,590	6.41	0
Natural Law Party	6,278	1.16	0
Total	539,555	100.00	7
Valid votes	539,555	92.64	
Invalid/blank votes	42,875	7.36	
Total votes	582,430	100.00	
Registered voters/turnout	647,118	90.00	
Source: Ministry of the Interior

Vote in Trentino
Party	Votes	%	Seats
Pole of Freedoms	80,875	28.88	3
Pact for Italy	61,259	21.88	1
Progressives	59,246	21.16	0
SVP (PATT)	55,786	19.92	0
National Alliance	21,207	7.57	0
Natural Law Party	1,625	0.58	0
Total	279,998	100.00	4
Valid votes	279,998	93.32	
Invalid/blank votes	20,040	6.68	
Total votes	300,038	100.00	
Registered voters/turnout	336,312	89.21	
Source: Ministry of the Interior

Vote in South Tyrol
Party	Votes	%	Seats
South Tyrolean People's Party	161,351	62.16	3
ADA (incl. PDS, PPI, Grüne)	34,590	13.33	0
National Alliance	32,182	12.40	0
Pole of Freedoms	26,781	10.32	0
Natural Law Party	4,653	1.79	0
Total	259,557	100.00	3
Valid votes	259,557	91.91	
Invalid/blank votes	22,835	8.09	
Total votes	282,392	100.00	
Registered voters/turnout	310,806	90.86	
Source: Ministry of the Interior

=== Elected members of Parliament ===
==== Chamber of Deputies ====
South Tyrolean People's Party

- Siegfried Brugger
- Hans Widmann
- Karl Zeller

Pole of Freedoms

Forza Italia

- Sergio Chiesa
- Giancarlo Innocenzi
- Paolo Odorizzi

Lega Nord

- Elisabetta Bertotti
- Rolando Fontan

Pact for Italy

Italian People's Party

- Renzo Gubert

National Alliance

- Pietro Mitolo

==== Senate of the Republic ====
South Tyrolean People's Party

- Karl Ferrari
- Roland Riz
- Helga Thaler Ausserhofer

Pole of Freedoms

Forza Italia

- Gianfranco Spisani

Lega Nord

- Costantino Armani
- Erminio Boso

Pact for Italy

Italian People's Party

- Aldo Degaudenz

== See also ==
- 1994 Italian general election in Aosta Valley
- Proporz
