= 1994 European Parliament election in Trentino-Alto Adige/Südtirol =

The European Parliament election of 1994 took place in Trentino-Alto Adige/Südtirol, as well as the rest of Italy, on 12 June 1994.

The South Tyrolean People's Party formed an apparentment with the Italian People's Party, the successor of their old ally Christian Democracy.

== Results ==
=== Regional level ===
Party	Votes	%
South Tyrolean People's Party (incl. PATT)	193,280	33.04
Forza Italia	118,585	20.27
Italian People's Party	61,711	10.55
National Alliance	42,012	7.18
Federation of the Greens (incl. Grüne)	40,499	6.92
Democratic Party of the Left	33,938	5.80
Lega Nord (incl. LNT–LAAST)	27,842	4.76
Federalismo (dF–UfS)	16,019	2.74
Communist Refoundation Party	14,108	2.41
Segni Pact	10,148	1.73
Pannella List	7,860	1.34
The Network	5,948	1.02
Italian Socialist Party–Democratic Alliance	4,479	0.77
Southern Action League	3,086	0.53
Italian Republican Party	2,133	0.36
Italian Democratic Socialist Party	1,979	0.34
Lega Alpina Lumbarda	1,336	0.23
Total	584,963	100.00
Valid votes	584,963	97.51
Invalid/blank votes	14,946	2.49
Total votes	599,909	100.00
Registered voters/turnout	738,026	81.29
Source: Ministry of the Interior

=== Provincial level ===
==== Trentino ====
Party	Votes	%
Forza Italia	87,897	28.71
Italian People's Party	54,834	17.91
South Tyrolean People's Party (PATT)	34,582	11.30
Democratic Party of the Left	26,105	8.53
Lega Nord (incl. LNT)	24,159	7.89
National Alliance	19,617	6.41
Federation of the Greens	15,641	5.11
Communist Refoundation Party	10,938	3.57
Segni Pact	8,551	2.79
Pannella List	5,586	1.82
The Network	5,405	1.77
Federalism	3,147	1.03
Italian Socialist Party–Democratic Alliance	2,944	0.96
Southern Action League	2,526	0.83
Italian Republican Party	1,579	0.52
Italian Democratic Socialist Party	1,571	0.51
Lega Alpina Lumbarda	1,065	0.35
Total	306,147	100.00
Valid votes	306,147	97.76
Invalid/blank votes	7,025	2.24
Total votes	313,172	100.00
Registered voters/turnout	383,797	81.60
Source: Ministry of the Interior

==== South Tyrol ====
Some politicians of regional parties ran on the lists: Alexander Langer (Grüne for FdV), Alfons Benedikter (Union for South Tyrol for Federalismo) and Pius Leitner (Die Freiheitlichen for Federalismo) both became the most voted persons in the regions for the lists.

Party	Votes	%
South Tyrolean People's Party	158,698	56.92
Forza Italia	30,688	11.01
Federation of the Greens (incl. Grüne)	24,858	8.92
National Alliance	22,395	8.03
Federalismo (dF–UfS)	12,872	4.62
Democratic Party of the Left	7,833	2.81
Italian People's Party	6,877	2.47
Lega Nord (incl. LAAST)	3,683	1.32
Communist Refoundation Party	3,170	1.14
Pannella List	2,274	0.82
Segni Pact	1,597	0.57
Italian Socialist Party–Democratic Alliance	1,535	0.55
Southern Action League	560	0.20
Italian Republican Party	554	0.20
The Network	543	0.19
Italian Democratic Socialist Party	408	0.15
Lega Alpina Lumbarda	271	0.10
Total	278,816	100.00
Valid votes	278,816	94.91
Invalid/blank votes	14,946	5.09
Total votes	293,762	100.00
Registered voters/turnout	354,229	82.93
Source: Ministry of the Interior
