= Monolithic active pixel sensor =

Sensor for ionizing radiation

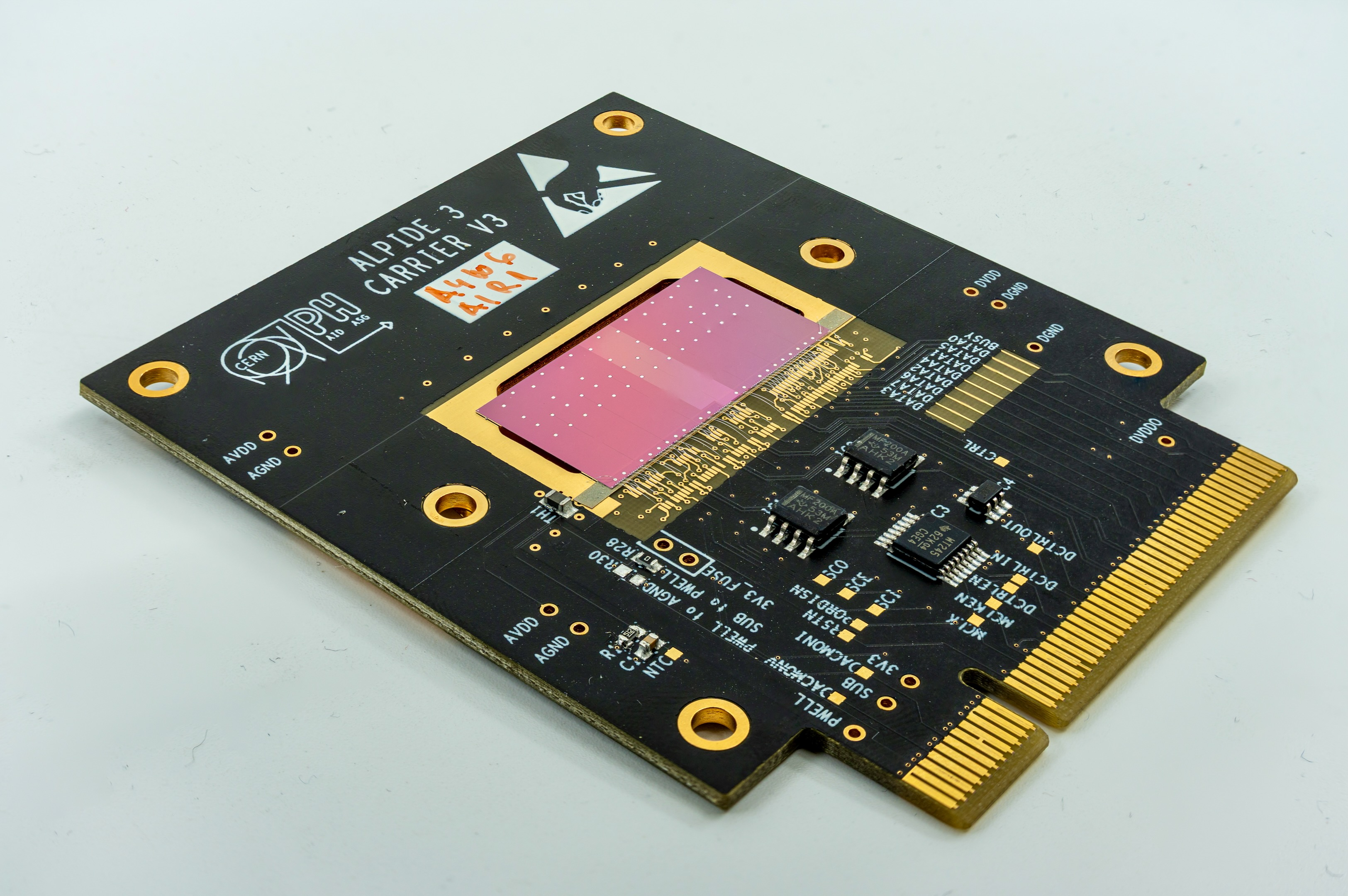
ALPIDE MAPS on carrier card

A monolithic active pixel sensor (MAPS) is a type of CMOS active-pixel sensor optimized for detection of the ionizing radiation rather than the visible light. In MAPS, both the sensor and the readout electronics are integrated onto the same silicon substrate. The term monolithic is used to distinguish CMOS APS from hybrid pixel detectors in which the sensor and the readout electronics are on two different substrates, normally connected by bump-bonding.

MAPS-based detectors offer exceptional spatial resolution at low noise, power consumption, material budget, and cost. Their most significant application lies in high-energy physics experiments, particularly those that require coverage of large areas and moderate radiation hardness, such as the ALICE experiment at the CERN Large Hadron Collider.

== History ==
MAPS technology was initially developed in the 1990s as an alternative to traditional charge-coupled devices (CCDs) and hybrid pixel sensors. Advances in CMOS fabrication allowed for the integration of particle detection and signal processing on a single chip, reducing complexity and power consumption, while significantly increasing the readout speed with respect to CCDs. The introduction of MAPS into particle physics was driven by the need for lightweight, high-resolution sensors capable of operating in high-radiation environments.

A first sensor for HEP in a standard technology, the MIMOSA or Minimum Ionizing particle MOS Active pixel Sensor was developed by Institut pluridisciplinaire Hubert Curien (IPHC) in standard 0.6 μm VLSI CMOS technology. This marked a series of MIMOSA chips, of which MIMOSA28, alias ULTIMATE chip, was used in STAR Heavy Flavor Tracker. A significant advancement was made by the Rutherford Appleton Laboratory (RAL) in collaboration with TowerJazz semiconductor. This involved integrating complete CMOS circuitry within the pixel, which is crucial for more sophisticated readout methods. This process was instrumental in numerous subsequent developments, including the ALPIDE sensor used in the ALICE experiment, the first MAPS sensor with a sparse readout akin to hybrid sensors.

== Operating principle ==
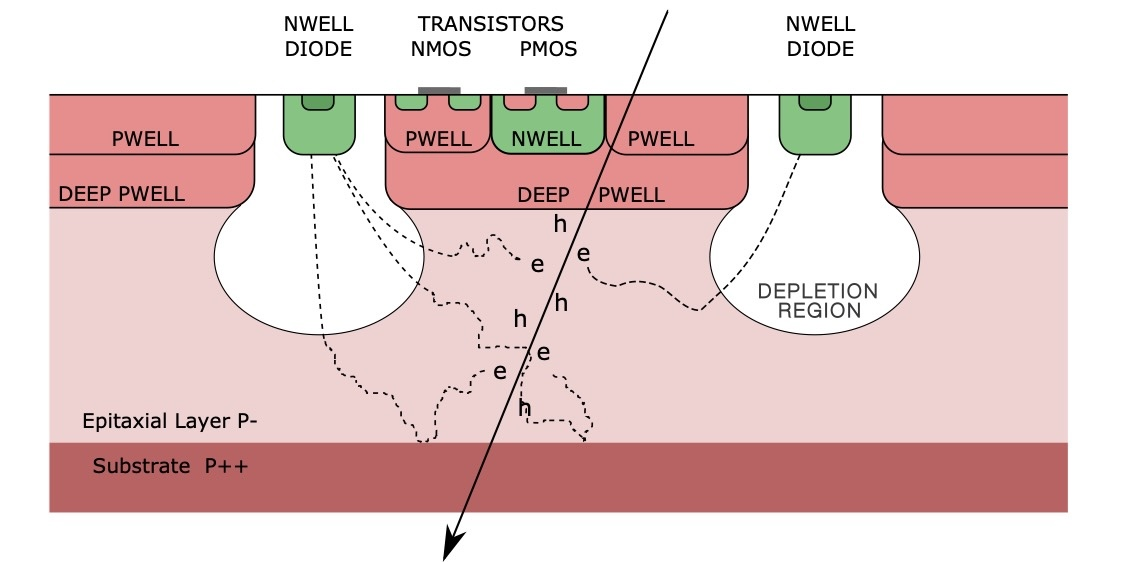
Schematic cross section of a monolithic active pixel sensor

Referring to the cross-sectional view of a conventional monolithic active pixel sensor, the following layers are discernible, commencing from the bottom:

- a highly doped (p^{++}) silicon substrate, serving as a mechanical support.
- a thin (several tens of micrometers, typically high-resistivity) p-type epitaxial layer, utilized as the sensitive volume.
- n-type and p-type implants on top of the epitaxial layer.
- metal layers employed for signal routing.

N-type implants in contact with p-type epitaxial layer form p–n junctions that function as diodes for collecting current induced by the passage of an ionizing particle, while p-wells host the CMOS circuitry. A small voltage is applied to the diode, resulting in a depleted region. By applying a negative (reverse) bias voltage to the diode through the substrate, the depleted region can be further increased. Depending on the epitaxial layer thickness and resistivity, n-type implant doping, and bias applied, the epitaxial layer can be partially or fully depleted.

A charged particle traversing silicon experiences energy loss through ionization, generating electron–hole pairs along its path. Electrons originating from the epitaxial layer are confined within this region due to the disparity in doping levels, which imposes a potential barrier. Subsequently, these electrons diffuse thermally within the epitaxial layer until they encounter a depleted region, where, under the influence of the electric field, they drift towards the collection diode. Electrons generated within the p-wells or the substrate, which diffuse into the epitaxial layer, undergo the same process.

Signal formation in MAPS depends on the junction capacitance of the collection diode and the input capacitance of the in-pixel readout circuit. A charge collection discharges the capacitance thus causing a voltage drop $\textstyle \Delta V = \frac{Q}{C}$, where Q is the amount of collected charge and C the total capacitance. To optimize the signal-to-noise ratio, the collection diode tends to be as small as possible to decrease the junction capacitance.

To enhance readout speed and decrease data throughput, MAPS readout circuitry typically incorporates in-pixel amplification and discrimination. This approach retains only the information about the particle's hit position, effectively discarding the energy (charge) information. For instance, the ALPIDE chip, featuring 1024 × 512 pixel matrix with hit/no-hit readout, was designed to operate at 100 kHz readout rate.

== High-energy physics applications ==
Given their very thin sensitive volume, MAPS wafers can be thinned down to a total thickness of less than 50 μm. Their low power dissipation and, consequently, light cooling requirements enable the use of lightweight support mechanics. This makes them an appealing detector for experiments that prioritize low material costs and high granularity, such as nuclear physics experiments.

=== STAR HFT ===
The Heavy Flavor Tracker (HFT) of the STAR experiment at RHIC is the first application of the Monolithic Active Pixel Sensors technology in a collider environment. The sensor chip used is the "Ultimate-2" MAPS sensor developed by IPHC in Strasbourg, France, and optimized for the STAR environment. A total of 400 sensors cover a surface area of 0.16 m^{2} with 356 megapixels and a pixel pitch of 20.7 μm. A relatively low power dissipation of 170 mW/cm^{2} allows these sensors to be operated at room temperature with just air cooling, resulting in a further reduction of the material budget.

=== ALICE ITS2 ===
Wafer with ALPIDE chips

The ALICE experiment at CERN has undergone a major upgrade during the Long Shutdown 2 of the LHC during 2019–2021, replacing its Inner Tracking System with a detector fully based on MAPS. The ITS2 state-of-the-art MAPS sensor, ALPIDE, is fabricated in the TowerJazz 180 nm CMOS Imaging Process. ALPIDE features in-pixel amplification, shaping and discrimination as well multiple-event buffers. A priority-encoder circuit is employed to read only the addresses of hit-pixels and achieve in-matrix data-sparsification. ITS2 achieves 5 μm spatial resolution with pixel pitch of 29.24 μm × 26.88 μm at power dissipation below 40 mW/cm^{2}. A total of about 24000 ALPIDE chips arranged in 7 cylindrical layers cover a total detector surface is about 10 m^{2} counting 12.5 gigapixels.

=== ALICE ITS3 ===
Monolithic Stitched Sensor (MOSS) developed for ALICE ITS3 on a carrier card

A further upgrade of ALICE Inner Tracking System is planned for the Long Shutdown 3, in which the three innermost layers of the ITS2 will be fully replaced by wafer-scale, bent MAPS, produced in TPSCo 65 nm CMOS Imaging Sensor process.

== Space-based applications ==
Pixel sensors for space-based tracking detectors necessitate low power consumption and improved heat dissipation to manage the satellite's limited power and cooling resources. MAPS offers an alternative solution, addressing the requirements for the first time.

=== HEPD-02 tracker ===
The CSES-02 satellite's High Energy Particle Detector (HEPD) tracker pioneers the use of Monolithic Active Pixel Sensors in space. This innovation is enabled by a low-power FPGA featuring a parallel sparsified readout that oversees 150 ALPIDE chips across three planes. Energy efficiency is enhanced by using the control line for ALPIDE chip readouts instead of high-speed data links and by selectively distributing the clock signal only to particle-traversed detector areas.
