= Sepp Kusstatscher =

Italian politician (born 1947)

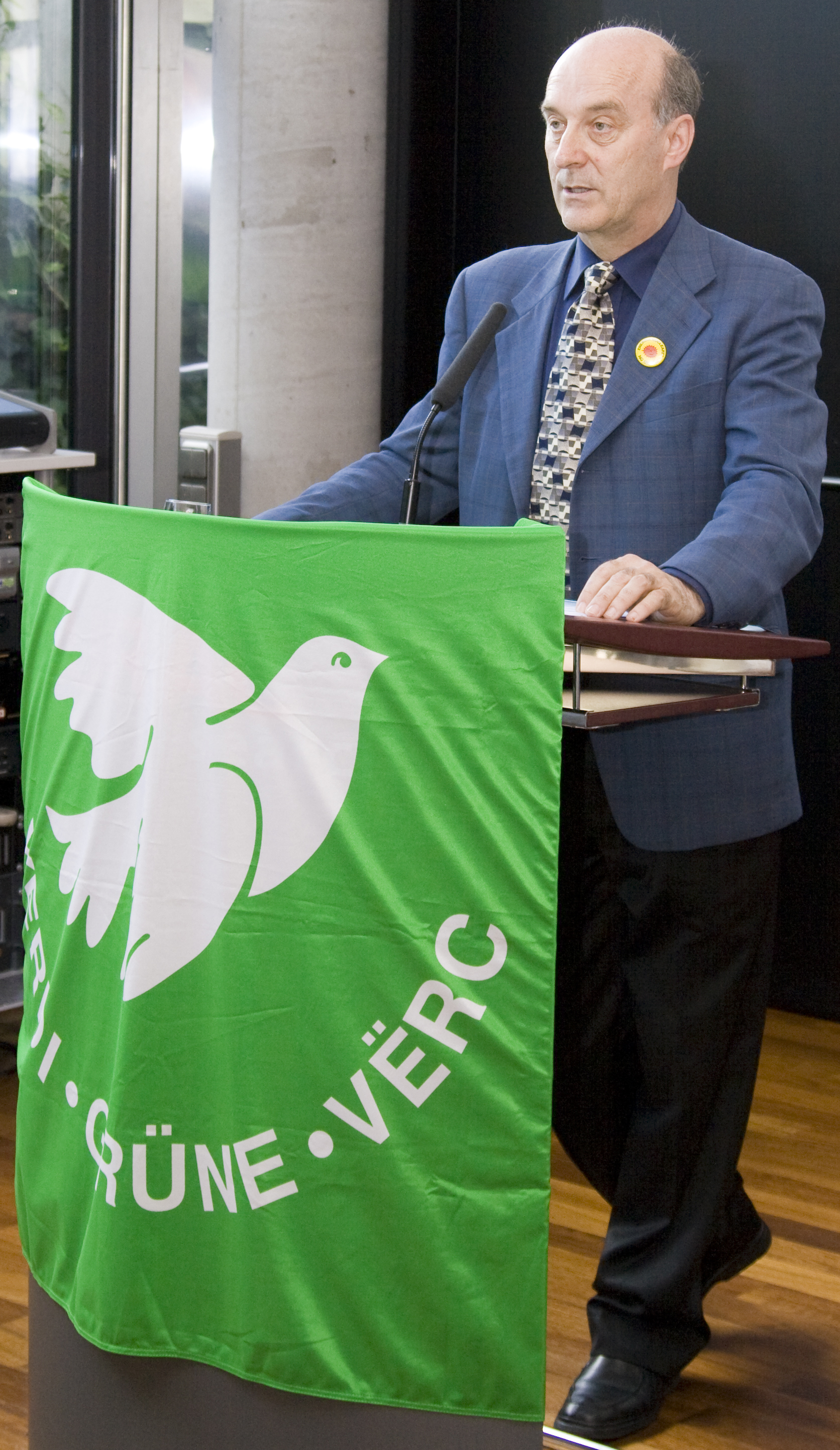
Sepp Kusstatscher

Sepp Kusstatscher (born 17 March 1947 in Villanders) is an Italian politician and former Member of the European Parliament for North-East with the Federation of the Greens, part of the European Greens and sat on the European Parliament's Committee on Employment and Social Affairs. Furthermore, he is speaker of the Green Party of South Tyrol.

He was a substitute for the Committee on Transport and Tourism, a member of the Delegation to the EU-Former Yugoslav Republic of Macedonia Joint Parliamentary Committee and a substitute for the Delegation to the ACP-EU Joint Parliamentary Assembly.

== Education ==
- 1974: Master of Theology
- 1977: Teaching certificate (vocational schools)
- 1974–1979: Teacher at various schools
- 1979–1986: Director of the Brixen vocational school for trade, commerce and industry
- 1986–2001: Hotel and catering section
- 2001–2003: Training officer for vocational teachers in the province of South Tyrol

== Political career ==
- 1973–1974: Chairman of the South Tyrol Students' Union
- 1974–1985: Mayor of Villanders
- 1983–1988: Chairman of the Lower Eisack Valley Water Treatment Association
- 1984–2004: Chairman of the Villanders Education Committee
- 1988–1993: Member (SVP), Provincial Council of South Tyrol and Trentino-Alto Adige/Südtirol Regional Council, Chairman of the First Legislative Commission
- 1989–1994: Chairman of the social affairs committees, South Tyrolean People's Party (SVP)
- 2003–2004: Member Green Party of South Tyrol, Provincial Council of South Tyrol and Trentino-Alto Adige/Südtirol Regional Council
- 2004–2009 Member of the European Parliament
- 2009– Chairman of the Green Party of South Tyrol

== See also ==
- 2004 European Parliament election in Italy
