= JWA List =

JWA List Liste JWA
- Leader: Jürgen Wirth Anderlan
- Founded: July 2023
- Ideology: Regionalism; Right-wing populism Separatism; German-speaking minority interests
- Political position: Right-wing to far-right
- Chamber of Deputies: 0 / 400
- Senate: 0 / 200
- European Parliament: 0 / 76
- Provincial Council: 1 / 35

Website
- www.listejwa.com

JWA List (German: Liste JWA, JWA), also known as JWA – Wirth Anderlan, is a right-wing populist and separatist political party active in South Tyrol, Italy. The party has the aim of representing the German-speaking minority, holds an Eurosceptic stance, opposes immigration, and is involved in anti-vaccine activism. The party's founder and leader is Jürgen Wirth Anderlan, a former Südtiroler Schützenbund captain.

== History ==
The JWA List was founded by Anderlan in July 2023 with the aim of running in the 2023 provincial election. JWA ran on a right-wing platform, especially opposing immigration and advocating for the separation of South Tyrol from Italy.

In the election, the party took 5.9% of the vote, fending off competition from the fellow anti-vaccine grouping Vita, becoming the province's fifth largest party, surpassing the established right-wing Die Freiheitlichen and electing two councilors, Anderlan and SVP dissident Andreas Colli.

In October 2024 Colli left the party and launched the alternative Us Citizens (WB).

== Election results ==
=== Landtag of South Tyrol ===
Landtag of South Tyrol
Election	Leader	Votes	%	Seats	+/−
2023	Jürgen Wirth Anderlan	16,596	5.9	2 / 35	New

== Leadership ==
- Leader: Jürgen Wirth Anderlan (2023–present)
