= The Civic List (South Tyrol) =

The Civic List La Civica
- Leader: Angelo Gennaccaro
- Founded: 2023
- Ideology: Regionalism; Liberalism
- Political position: Centre
- Provincial Council: 1 / 35

The Civic List (Italian: La Civica, LC) is a centrist regional electoral list active in South Tyrol, Italy.

LC was formed in the run-up of the 2023 Trentino-Alto Adige/Südtirol provincial elections by the union of Italian-speaking local civic lists active in Bolzano and Merano. LC obtained the support from two liberal countrywide parties, Action and Italia Viva, and welcomed some of their candidates in its slates.

In the election, LC obtained 2.6% of the vote and Angelo Gennaccaro from Bolzano was elected to the Landtag of South Tyrol. After the election, the party joined the new governing coalition formed by the South Tyrolean People's Party (SVP), the Brothers of Italy (FdI), Die Freiheitlichen (dF) and Lega Alto Adige Südtirol (LAAST). Under the coalition agreement, LC was the only party not to be represented in the government, to which it would provide external support, but Gennaccaro was elected vice president of the Landtag. Additionally, in early 2024, Gennaccaro was appointed as minister in the regional government.

== Composition ==
Parties	Leader(s)
I stay with Bolzano	Angelo Gennaccaro
Alliance for Merano	Nerio Zaccaria
The civic list for Merano	Andrea Casolari

== Election results ==
=== Landtag of South Tyrol ===
Landtag of South Tyrol
Election	Leader	Votes	%	Seats	+/−
2023	Angelo Gennaccaro	7,301	2.6	1 / 35	New
