= 2023 Trentino-Alto Adige/Südtirol provincial elections =

Italian regional election

- 22 October 2023
- Provincial election in Trentino
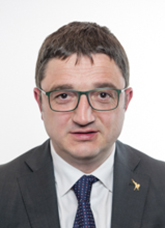

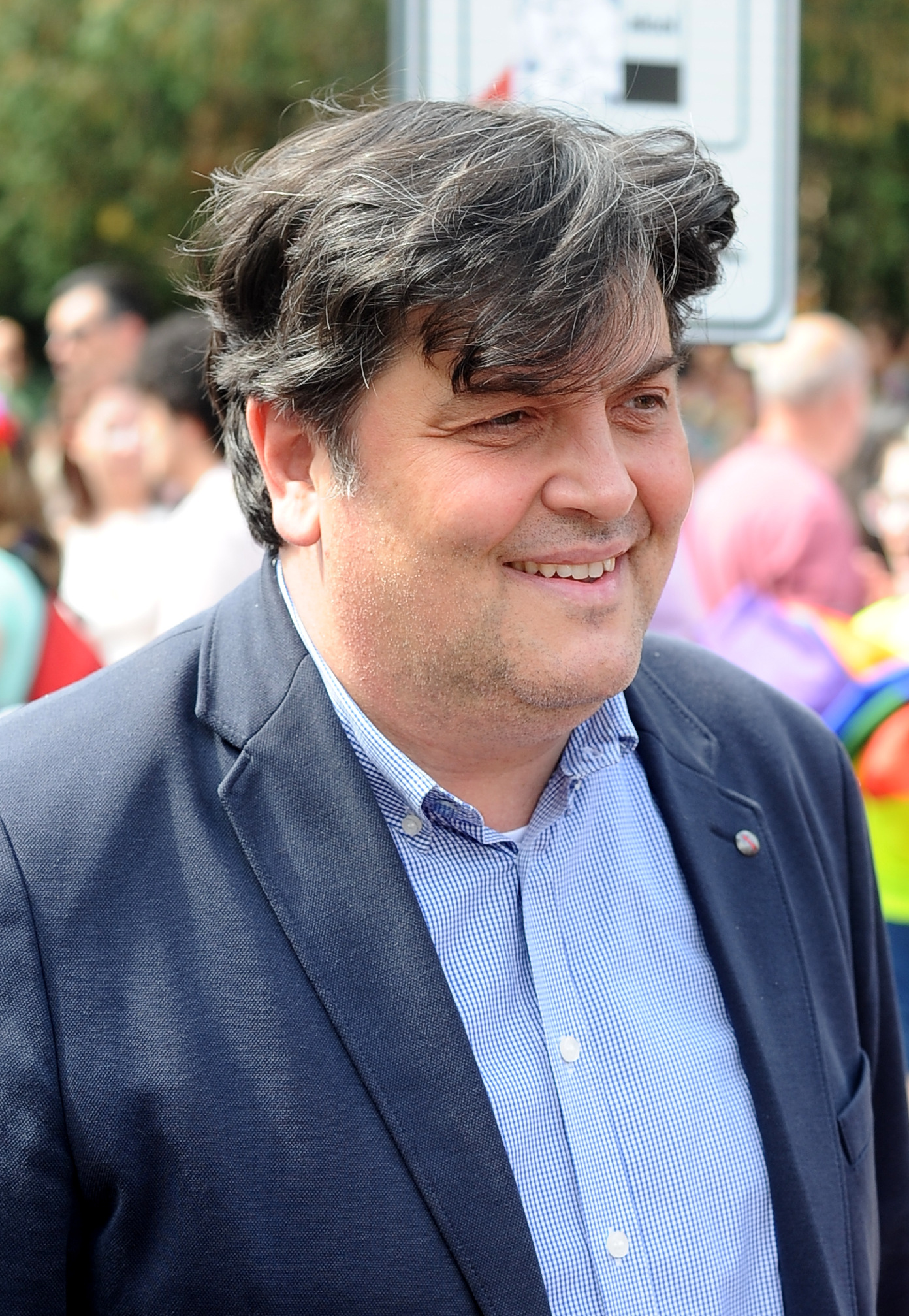
	First party	Second party
Candidate	Maurizio Fugatti	Francesco Valduga
Party	Lega	Campobase
Alliance	Centre-right	Centre-left
Seats won	21	13
Seat change	▼4	▲5
Popular vote	129,758	93,888
Percentage	51.82%	37.50%
Swing	▼7.33%	▲12.10%
President before election
Maurizio Fugatti
LT–Lega
Elected President
Maurizio Fugatti
LT–Lega
- Provincial election in South Tyrol
- All 35 seats to the Landtag of South Tyrol
Party	Leader	Vote %	Seats	+/–
SVP	Arno Kompatscher	34.5	13	−2
Team K	Paul Köllensperger	11.1	4	−2
STF	Sven Knoll	10.9	4	+2
Greens	Brigitte Foppa	9.0	3	0
FdI	Marco Galateo	6.0	2	+1
JWA List	Jürgen Wirth Anderlan	5.9	2	New
dF	Sabine Zoderer	4.9	2	0
PD	Sandro Repetto	3.5	1	0
FSW	Thomas Widmann	3.4	1	0
Lega	Christian Bianchi	3.0	1	−3
La Civica	Emanuela Albieri	2.6	1	New
Vita	Renate Holzeisen	2.6	1	New
This lists parties that won seats. See the complete results below.
Governor before	Elected Governor
Arno Kompatscher; SVP	Arno Kompatscher; SVP

The 2023 Trentino-Alto Adige/Südtirol provincial elections took place on 22 October 2023. It determined two seats for Trentino-Alto Adige/Südtirol out of 21 in the Conference of Regions and Autonomous Provinces.

== Background ==
Since the 2018 Italian general election, many changes started to occur in the Trentino-Alto Adige/Südtirol political landscape. For the first time since the 1996 Italian general election, the centre-right coalition managed to defeat the centre-left coalition in Trentino in a general election. Shortly thereafter, the Trentino Tyrolean Autonomist Party (PATT) decided to run separately (German: Blockfrei), leading to the first victory of the Maurizio Fugatti-led centre-right coalition in a provincial election in Trentino since the start of the Second Italian Republic with the 1994 Italian general election.

In South Tyrol, the traditionally dominant-party system led by the South Tyrolean People's Party (SVP) lost its majority in the 2013 Trentino-Alto Adige/Südtirol provincial elections. In the 2018 general election, the SVP and the Democratic Party of the centre-left coalition lost their majority, forcing SVP to form a coalition with Lega Alto Adige Südtirol due to the ethnischer Proporz system (Italian: proporzionale etnica). In the 2019 European Parliament election in Trentino-Alto Adige/Südtirol, the SVP broke their traditional alliance with the PD and joined forces with the centre-right Forza Italia. Similarly in the 2022 general election SVP and PATT decided to run separated from the centre-left and joined forced with some centre-right autonomist parties like Trentino Project.

After Brothers of Italy became largest party in Trentino in the 2022 general election, FdI proposed Francesca Gerosa as the new centre-right candidate. This led to a conflict with PATT, which joined the centre-right coalition in an election for the first time since 2001, which strongly spoke against her.

== Trentino ==
In Trentino, the president is elected directly by the people; the candidate who gains the most votes is elected president.

=== Parties and candidates ===
Political party or alliance	Constituent lists	Previous result		Candidate
Political party or alliance	Constituent lists	Votes (%)	Seats	Candidate
Centre-right coalition	Trentino League (LT)	27.1	13	Maurizio Fugatti
Centre-right coalition	Trentino Tyrolean Autonomist Party–Popular Autonomists (PATT–AP) (incl. PT)	17.8	6	Maurizio Fugatti
Centre-right coalition	La Civica (LC)	4.6	2	Maurizio Fugatti
Centre-right coalition	Forza Italia (FI)	2.8	1	Maurizio Fugatti
Centre-right coalition	Union of the Centre (UDC)	2.1	0	Maurizio Fugatti
Centre-right coalition	Brothers of Italy (FdI)	1.4	0	Maurizio Fugatti
Centre-right coalition	Fassa Association (Fassa)	1.0	1	Maurizio Fugatti
Centre-right coalition	Fugatti for President	—N/a	—N/a	Maurizio Fugatti
Democratic Alliance for Trentino	Democratic Party (PD) (incl. Futura)	13.9	4	Francesco Valduga
Democratic Alliance for Trentino	Campobase (CB)	4.0	1	Francesco Valduga
Democratic Alliance for Trentino	Greens and Left Alliance (AVS)	1.4	0	Francesco Valduga
Democratic Alliance for Trentino	Action (Az)	—N/a	—N/a	Francesco Valduga
Democratic Alliance for Trentino	Italia Viva (IV)	—N/a	—N/a	Francesco Valduga
Democratic Alliance for Trentino	Fascegn	—N/a	—N/a	Francesco Valduga
Democratic Alliance for Trentino	Autonomy House (CA)	—N/a	—N/a	Francesco Valduga
Five Star Movement (M5S)		7.2	1	Alex Marini
People's Wave	People's Union	0.8	0	Filippo Degasperi
People's Wave	Wave	—N/a	—N/a	Filippo Degasperi
People's Wave	My Valley	—N/a	—N/a	Filippo Degasperi
Alliance for Trentino	Us with Divina for President (NcD)	—N/a	—N/a	Sergio Divina
Alliance for Trentino	Popular Alternative (AP)	—N/a	—N/a	Sergio Divina
Alliance for Trentino	Youth for Divina	—N/a	—N/a	Sergio Divina
Sovereign Popular Democracy (DSP)		—N/a	—N/a	Marco Rizzo
Alternative		—N/a	—N/a	Elena Dardo

=== Opinion polling ===
==== Candidates ====
Date	Polling firm	Sample size	Fugatti	Valduga	Marini	Degasperi	Divina	Rizzo	Dardo	Others	Lead
2–3 October 2023	BiDiMedia	1,000	42.7	35.9	4.2	4.5	9.0	3.2	0.5	—N/a	6.8
12–17 September 2023	TermometroPolitico	1,000	35	36	5	2	13	6	—N/a	3	1

==== Political parties ====
Date	Polling firm	Sample size	Centre-right									Centre-left								M5S	Onda Popolare			Alliance for Trentino				DSP	Alt.	Lead
Date	Polling firm	Sample size	Trentino League	PATT–PT–AP	LC	FI	UdC	FdI	Fassa	NM (Note: withdrew)	Fugatti	PD	Futura	CB	AVS	Az	IV	CA	Fascegn	M5S	UP	Onda	LMV	TAL	NcD	AP	GDP	DSP	Alt.	Lead
2–3 October 2023	BiDiMedia	1,000	10.6	6.7	5.3	1.3	0.8	13.6	1.1	—N/a	5.6	16.3	—N/a	6.8	3.7	2.0	1.3	4.8	0.7	3.9	1.0	2.5	0.8	—N/a	3.5	3.2	1.3	2.7	0.5	2.7
11–14 July 2023	Winpoll	850	10	11	4	3	1	20	—N/a	2	—N/a	18	1	3	6	3	2	2	—N/a	7	4		—N/a	2	—N/a	—N/a	—N/a	1	—N/a	2

=== Results ===
2023 Trentino provincial election results
Candidates	Votes	%	Seats	Parties	Votes	%	Seats	+/−
Maurizio Fugatti	129,758	51.82	1					
Maurizio Fugatti	129,758	51.82	1	Trentino League	30,347	13.05	5	–8
Maurizio Fugatti	129,758	51.82	1	Brothers of Italy	28,714	12.35	5	+4
Maurizio Fugatti	129,758	51.82	1	Fugatti for President	24,953	10.73	4	New
Maurizio Fugatti	129,758	51.82	1	Trentino Tyrolean Autonomist Party	19,011	8.18	3	–3
Maurizio Fugatti	129,758	51.82	1	La Civica	11,285	4.85	2	±0
Maurizio Fugatti	129,758	51.82	1	Forza Italia	4,708	2.02	0	–1
Maurizio Fugatti	129,758	51.82	1	Fassa Association	2,018	0.87	1	±0
Maurizio Fugatti	129,758	51.82	1	Union of the Centre	1,362	0.59	0	±0
Maurizio Fugatti	129,758	51.82	1	Total	122,398	52.64	20	–4
Francesco Valduga	93,888	37.50	1					
Francesco Valduga	93,888	37.50	1	Democratic Party	38,689	16.64	7	+3
Francesco Valduga	93,888	37.50	1	Campobase	19,553	8.41	3	+2
Francesco Valduga	93,888	37.50	1	Autonomy House	9,968	4.29	1	New
Francesco Valduga	93,888	37.50	1	Greens and Left Alliance	7,565	3.25	1	+1
Francesco Valduga	93,888	37.50	1	Fascegn	3,634	1.56	0	±0
Francesco Valduga	93,888	37.50	1	Italia Viva	3,399	1.46	0	New
Francesco Valduga	93,888	37.50	1	Action	3,302	1.42	0	New
Francesco Valduga	93,888	37.50	1	Total	86,110	37.03	12	+5
Filippo Degasperi	9,533	3.81	1					
Filippo Degasperi	9,533	3.81	1	Wave	5,864	2.52	0	New
Filippo Degasperi	9,533	3.81	1	My Valley	1,204	0.52	0	New
Filippo Degasperi	9,533	3.81	1	People's Union	1,088	0.47	0	±0
Filippo Degasperi	9,533	3.81	1	Total	8,156	3.51	0	—
Marco Rizzo	5,651	2.26	0	Sovereign Popular Democracy	5,457	2.35	0	New
Sergio Divina	5,558	2.22	0					
Sergio Divina	5,558	2.22	0	Popular Alternative	2,261	0.97	0	New
Sergio Divina	5,558	2.22	0	Us with Divina for President	1,845	0.79	0	New
Sergio Divina	5,558	2.22	0	Youth for Divina	642	0.28	0	New
Sergio Divina	5,558	2.22	0	Total	4,748	2.04	0	—
Alex Marini	4,796	1.92	0	Five Star Movement	4,523	1.95	0	–1
Elena Dardo	1,205	0.48	0	Alternative	1,121	0.48	0	New
Total candidates	250,389	100	3	Total parties	232,513	100	32	±0
Source: Autonomous Province of Trento

== South Tyrol ==
=== Parties ===
Name		Ideology	Leading candidate(s)	2018 result		Current seats
Name		Ideology	Leading candidate(s)	Votes (%)	Seats	Current seats
SVP	South Tyrolean People's Party	Christian democracy Regionalism	Arno Kompatscher	41.9%	15 / 35	14 / 35
TK	Team K	Liberalism; Regionalism	Paul Köllensperger; Maria Elisabeth Rieder	15.2%	6 / 35	4 / 35
Lega	League – United for Alto Adige	Right-wing populism Regionalism	Christian Bianchi	11.4%	4 / 35	3 / 35
V–G–V	Greens (incl. SI)	Eco-socialism; Regionalism	Brigitte Foppa	6.8%	3 / 35	3 / 35
dF	Die Freiheitlichen	National conservatism Separatism	Sabine Zoderer	6.2%	2 / 35	2 / 35
STF	South Tyrolean Freedom	National conservatism Separatism	Sven Knoll	6.2%	2 / 35	2 / 35
PD	Democratic Party (incl. PSI)	Social democracy	Sandro Repetto	3.8%	1 / 35	1 / 35
M5S	Five Star Movement	Populism	Diego Nicolini	2.4%	1 / 35	1 / 35
FdI	Brothers of Italy	National conservatism	Marco Galateo	1.7%	1 / 35	1 / 35
FI	Forza Italia (incl. UdC)	Liberal conservatism	Carlo Vettori	1.0%	0 / 35	1 / 35
FSmW	For South Tyrol with Widmann	Christian democracy Regionalism	Thomas Widmann	DNE		1 / 35
Enzian	Enzian	COVID-19 scepticism Regionalism	Josef Unterholzner	DNE		1 / 35
Vita	Vita	COVID-19 scepticism Anti-establishment	Renate Holzeisen	DNE		0 / 35
JWA	JWA List	Separatism; Right-wing populism	Jürgen Wirth Anderlan	DNE		0 / 35
CD	Centre-Right	Conservatism	Filippo Maturi	DNE		0 / 35
LC	La Civica (incl. Az, IV)	Liberalism	Emanuela Albieri	DNE		0 / 35

=== Opinion polling ===
Local regression trend line of poll results

Date	Polling firm	Sample size	SVP	TK	Lega	V-G-V	dF	STF	PD	M5S	FdI	FI	Enzian	FSmW	JWA	Vita	Others	Lead
Sep 2023	Insa	1,000	35	11	4	12	6	5	3	2	7	2	—N/a	5	2	2	4	23
Aug–Sep 2023	Apollis	1,002	32	14	5	11	6	6	4	—N/a	7	2	—N/a	5	3	2	3	18
Jul 2023	Insa	1,000	37	8	7	12	9	7	3	1	7	4	1	—N/a	—N/a	—N/a	4	25
Apr 2023	Demox	–	36.5	12.5	5.5	10.5	6.5	6.5	3.5	2.5	7.5	1.5	—N/a	—N/a	—N/a	—N/a	4	24
Feb–Mar 2023	Apollis	–	40	13	3	14	7	6	4	2	6	—N/a	1	—N/a	—N/a	—N/a	4	26
Early 2023	Komma (leak, incomplete)	–	36.5	TBA	5	TBA	TBA	TBA	TBA	5	8	1.5	TBA	—N/a	—N/a	—N/a	–	N/A
Aug 2022	Apollis	–	37	11	5	17	8	4	4	2	6	—N/a	3	—N/a	—N/a	—N/a	3	20
Jan 2022	Apollis	–	42	8	8	14	6	7	4	1	4	—N/a	1	—N/a	—N/a	—N/a	5	28
Jul 2021	Apollis	1,001	43	9	10	13	4	7	6	2	2	—N/a	0	—N/a	—N/a	—N/a	4	30
21 Oct 2018	2018 provincial election	284,361	41.9	15.2	11.4	6.8	6.2	6.0	3.8	2.4	1.7	1.0	—N/a	—N/a	—N/a	—N/a	4.0	26.7

=== Results ===
Party	Votes	%	Seats	+/–
South Tyrolean People's Party	97,092	34.53	13	−2
Team K	31,201	11.09	4	−2
South Tyrolean Freedom	30,583	10.88	4	+2
Greens	25,445	9.05	3	±0
Brothers of Italy	16,747	5.96	2	+1
JWA List	16,596	5.90	2	New
Die Freiheitlichen	13,836	4.92	2	±0
Democratic Party	9,707	3.45	1	±0
For South Tyrol with Widmann	9,646	3.43	1	±0
League–United for Alto Adige	8,541	3.04	1	−3
La Civica	7,301	2.60	1	New
Vita	7,222	2.57	1	New
Five Star Movement	2,086	0.74	–	−1
Enzian	1,990	0.71	–	New
Forza Italia	1,625	0.58	–	±0
Centre-Right	1,601	0.57	–	New
Total	281,219	100.00	35	–
Valid votes	281,219	96.87		
Invalid/blank votes	9,080	3.13		
Total votes	290,299	100.00		
Registered voters/turnout	429,841	67.54		
Source: Official Results

Popular vote
SVP	34.53%
TK	11.09%
STF	10.88%
Grüne	9.05%
FdI	5.96%
JWA	5.90%
dF	4.92%
PD	3.45%
Widmann	3.43%
Lega	3.04%
Civica	2.60%
Vita	2.57%
M5S	0.74%
Enzian	0.71%
FI	0.58%
CD	0.57%
