= Sara Cunial =

Italian politician

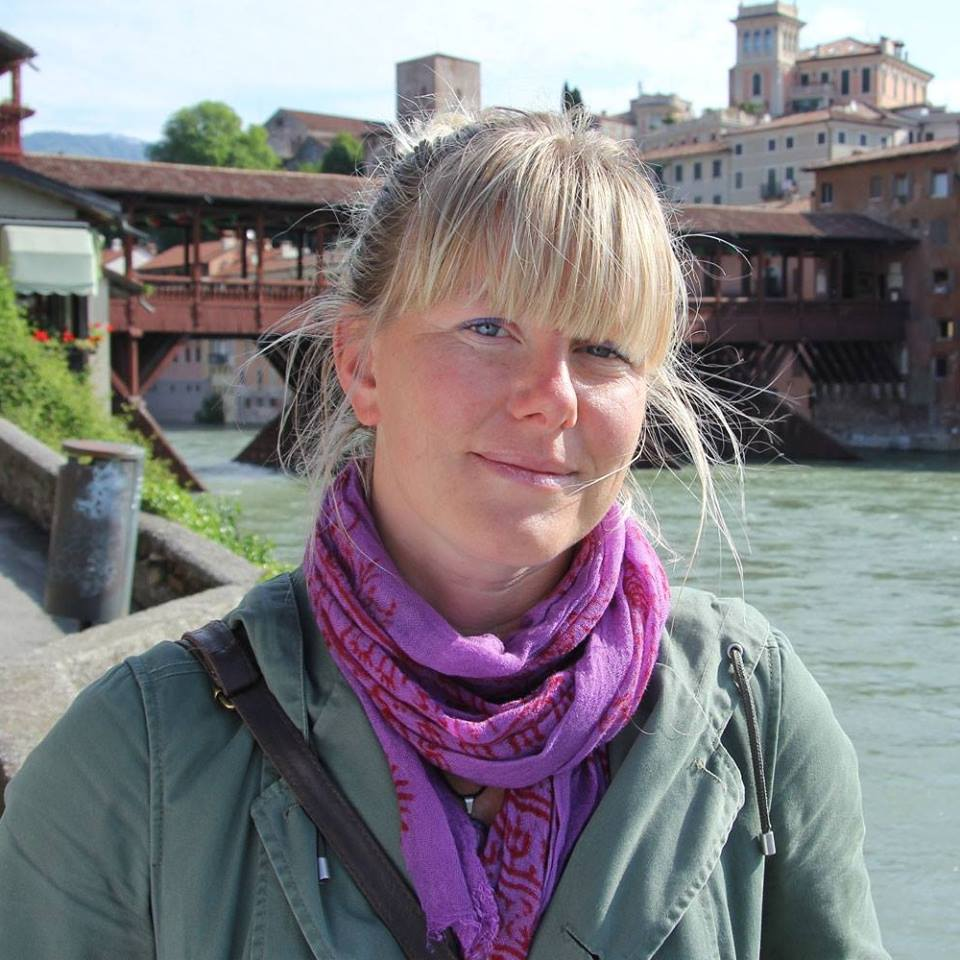

Member of the Chamber of Deputies
- In office 23 March 2018 – 12 October 2022
- Constituency: Veneto 2

Personal details
- Born: July 8, 1979 (age 46)
- Party: R2020 (2020–present); Vita (2022–present)
- Other political affiliations: M5S (2018–2019); Independent (2019–2020)
- Occupation: Politician

Sara Cunial (born 8 July 1979) is an Italian politician, formerly of the Five Star Movement. She is the founder and leader of Vita and led the electoral list into the 2022 Italian general election but was not re-elected.

== Political career ==
Cunial was elected to the Chamber of Deputies in the 2018 general election. She was expelled from the party in 2019, and sat as an independent.

== See also ==
- List of members of the Italian Chamber of Deputies, 2018–2022
