= 1996 Italian general election in Trentino-Alto Adige/Südtirol =

The 1996 Italian general election took place on 21 April 1996. In Trentino-Alto Adige/Südtirol, 17 seats were up for election: 10 for the Chamber of Deputies and 7 for the Senate of the Republic.

The South Tyrolean People's Party ran their own candidates as part of "The Fir" alliance with their sister party Trentino Tyrolean Autonomist Party (PATT) except for Bolzano constituency. In the proportional vote, they opted to join the Populars for Prodi of their longtime ally Italian People's Party which was part of The Olive Tree coalition. The list heavily underperformed with 27.4% in South Tyrol, far below their usual majority of the popular vote as many Germans voted the separatist Union for South Tyrol instead, who won 19%. Only in the 2008 provincial and general elections, SVP would fall below 50% and is their worst result ever as of 2024. The SVP would nevertheless stay in the centre-left coalition but also submit their own lists. Meanwhile, Italian Renewal reached one of their best results in the region.

== Results ==
=== Full results ===
==== Chamber of Deputies ====
FPTP

Party or alliance		Votes	%	Seats
The Fir	South Tyrolean People's Party	156,708	25.76	3
The Fir	PATT–The Fir	44,827	7.37	0
The Olive Tree		170,023	27.95	4
Pole for Freedoms		148,179	24.36	1
Lega Nord (LNAAST–LNT)		57,770	9.50	0
Union for South Tyrol		23,032	3.79	0
Natural Law Party		7,708	1.27	0
Total		608,247	100.00	8
Valid votes		608,247	92.21	
Invalid/blank votes		51,381	7.79	
Total votes		659,628	100.00	
Registered voters/turnout		756,092	87.24	
Source: Ministry of the Interior

Party vote

Party	Votes	%	Seats
Populars for Prodi (PPI–UD–PRI–SVP)	99,531	17.66	0
Forza Italia	80,449	14.28	0
Lega Nord (LNAAST–LNT)	74,586	13.24	1
National Alliance	65,803	11.68	1
Union for South Tyrol	55,548	9.86	0
Democratic Party of the Left	52,290	9.28	0
Italian Renewal	50,180	8.91	0
CCD–CDU	28,468	5.05	0
Federation of the Greens (incl. VGV)	27,795	4.93	0
Communist Refoundation Party	20,496	3.64	–
Natural Law Party	8,298	1.47	0
Total	563,444	100.00	2
Valid votes	563,444	85.41	
Invalid/blank votes	96,244	14.59	
Total votes	659,688	100.00	
Registered voters/turnout	756,092	87.25	
Source: Ministry of the Interior

===== Trentino =====
FPTP

Party	Votes	%	Seats
The Olive Tree	115,794	37.26	4
Pole for Freedoms	89,761	28.88	0
Lega Nord (LNT)	57,770	18.59	0
PATT–The Fir	44,827	14.42	0
Natural Law Party	2,627	0.85	0
Total	310,779	100.00	4
Valid votes	310,779	92.42	
Invalid/blank votes	25,477	7.58	
Total votes	336,256	100.00	
Registered voters/turnout	388,655	86.52	
Source: Ministry of the Interior

Party vote

Party	Votes	%
Lega Nord (LNT)	63,496	20.80
Forza Italia	57,068	18.69
Democratic Party of the Left	38,872	12.73
National Alliance	30,261	9.91
Populars for Prodi (PPI–UD–PRI)	27,594	9.04
Italian Renewal	27,536	9.02
CCD–CDU	24,131	7.90
Communist Refoundation Party	14,861	4.87
Federation of the Greens	13,859	4.54
Union for South Tyrol	5,859	1.92
Natural Law Party	1,754	0.57
Total	305,291	100.00
Valid votes	305,291	90.78
Invalid/blank votes	31,023	9.22
Total votes	336,314	100.00
Registered voters/turnout	388,655	86.53
Source: Ministry of the Interior

===== South Tyrol =====
FPTP

Party	Votes	%	Seats
South Tyrolean People's Party	156,708	52.68	3
Pole for Freedoms	58,418	19.64	1
The Olive Tree	54,229	18.23	0
Union for South Tyrol	23,032	7.74	0
Natural Law Party	5,081	1.71	0
Total	297,468	100.00	4
Valid votes	297,468	91.99	
Invalid/blank votes	25,904	8.01	
Total votes	323,372	100.00	
Registered voters/turnout	367,437	88.01	
Source: Ministry of the Interior

Party vote

Party	Votes	%
Populars for Prodi (PPI–UD–PRI–SVP)	72,129	27.42
Union for South Tyrol	49,640	18.87
National Alliance	35,594	13.53
Forza Italia	23,454	8.92
Italian Renewal	22,559	8.58
Federation of the Greens (VGV)	13,933	5.30
Democratic Party of the Left	13,402	5.10
Lega Nord (LNAAST)	11,090	4.22
Communist Refoundation Party	10,453	3.97
Natural Law Party	6,548	2.49
CCD–CDU	4,211	1.60
Total	263,013	100.00
Valid votes	263,013	80.14
Invalid/blank votes	65,188	19.86
Total votes	328,201	100.00
Registered voters/turnout	367,437	89.32
Source: Ministry of the Interior

==== Senate of the Republic ====
Party	Votes	%	Seats
The Fir (SVP–PATT)	178,425	33.41	2
The Olive Tree	143,788	26.93	2
Pole of Freedoms	126,999	23.78	3
Lega Nord (LNAAST–LNT)	59,619	11.16	–
Union for South Tyrol	19,330	3.62	–
Natural Law Party	5,842	1.09	–
Total	534,003	100.00	7
Valid votes	534,003	92.37	
Invalid/blank votes	44,103	7.63	
Total votes	578,106	100.00	
Registered voters/turnout	666,005	86.80	
Source: Ministry of the Interior

Vote in Trentino

Party	Votes	%	Seats
The Olive Tree	105,687	38.53	2
Pole of Freedoms	78,677	28.68	2
The Fir (PATT)	35,745	13.03	–
Lega Nord (LNT)	51,418	18.74	–
Natural Law Party	2,784	1.01	–
Total	274,311	100.00	4
Valid votes	274,311	92.34	
Invalid/blank votes	22,749	7.66	
Total votes	297,060	100.00	
Registered voters/turnout	345,117	86.08	
Source: Ministry of the Interior

Vote in South Tyrol

Party	Votes	%	Seats
The Fir (SVP)	142,680	54.94	2
Pole of Freedoms	48,322	18.61	1
The Olive Tree	38,101	14.67	–
Union for South Tyrol	19,330	7.44	–
Lega Nord (LNAAST)	8,201	3.16	–
Natural Law Party	3,058	1.18	–
Total	259,692	100.00	3
Valid votes	259,692	92.40	
Invalid/blank votes	21,354	7.60	
Total votes	281,046	100.00	
Registered voters/turnout	320,888	87.58	
Source: Ministry of the Interior

=== Elected members of Parliament ===
==== Chamber of Deputies ====
The Fir

- Siegfried Brugger (SVP)
- Hans Widmann (SVP)
- Karl Zeller (SVP)

Pole for Freedoms

National Alliance

- Pietro Mitolo

Forza Italia

- Franco Frattini

L'ULIVO

Democrats of the Left

- Luigi Olivieri
- Sandro Schmid

Federation of the Greens

- Marco Boato

Ladin Autonomist Union

- Giuseppe Detomas

Lega Nord

- Rolando Fontan

==== Senate of the Republic ====
The Fir

- Helga Thaler Ausserhofer (SVP)
- Armin Pinggera (SVP)

Pole for Freedoms

National Alliance

- Adriana Pasquali

CCD–UDC

- Renzo Gubert
- Ivo Tarolli

L'ULIVO

Italian People's Party

- Tarcisio Andreolli
- Alberto Robol

== See also ==
- 1996 Italian general election in Aosta Valley
- Proporz
