= 2004 European Parliament election in Trentino-Alto Adige/Südtirol =

The European Parliament election of 2004 took place on 12–13 June 2004 in the Trentino-Alto Adige/Südtirol autonomous region of Italy.

The Olive Tree was the most voted list in Trentino, while the South Tyrolean People's Party (SVP) came first as usual in South Tyrol. However the SVP lost many votes to the Greens, which had their best result ever, and to the Union for South Tyrol (UfS).

== Results ==
=== Trentino ===
Party	votes	votes (%)
The Olive Tree: Democracy is Freedom – The Daisy; Democrats of the Left; Italian Democratic Socialists; European Republicans Movement	93,719	37.7
Forza Italia	57,220	23.0
National Alliance	16,089	6.5
Lega Nord	15,813	6.4
Union of Christian and Centre Democrats	11,509	4.6
South Tyrolean People's Party	9,505	3.8
Communist Refoundation Party	8,816	3.6
Federation of the Greens	8,748	3.5
Bonino List	6,107	2.5
Italy of Values–Civil Society–Occhetto	5,439	2.2
Pensioners' Party	3,127	1.3
Party of Italian Communists	2,555	1.0
Others	9,793	3.9
Total	248,440	100.0

Source: Ministry of the Interior

=== South Tyrol ===
Party	votes	votes (%)
South Tyrolean People's Party	117,009	46.7
The Olive Tree: Democracy is Freedom – The Daisy; Democrats of the Left; Italian Democratic Socialists; European Republicans Movement	33,034	13.2
Greens	32,799	13.1
National Alliance	17,624	7.0
Forza Italia	17,192	6.7
Union for South Tyrol – others	15,739	6.3
Bonino List	2,790	1.1
Greens Greens	2,592	1.0
Communist Refoundation Party	2,528	1.0
Others	9,340	3.7
Total	250,647	100.0

Source: Ministry of the Interior
