= For South Tyrol with Widmann =

For South Tyrol with Widmann Für Südtirol mit Widmann
- Abbreviation: FSW
- Chairman: Thomas Widmann
- Founded: 20 July 2023
- Split from: South Tyrolean People's Party
- Headquarters: Brunner 1, 39050 Bolzano
- Ideology: Regionalism; German minority interests; Christian democracy
- Political position: Centre-right
- Colors: Black
- Chamber of Deputies: 0 / 400
- Senate: 0 / 200
- European Parliament: 0 / 76
- Provincial council: 1 / 35

Website
- Official website

For South Tyrol with Widmann (German: Für Südtirol mit Widmann, FSW) is a regionalist political party in South Tyrol, an autonomous province with a German-speaking majority in northern Italy. The party's founder and leader is Thomas Widmann, former secretary of the South Tyrolean People's Party.

== History ==
The party was created in July 2023 to contest in the 2023 provincial election following Thomas Widmann's departure from the SVP. Widman's disagreements with the SVP leadership date back to 2022, when he was removed from his office as provincial Councilor for Healthcare over his strongly critical stance about Arno Kompatscher's governorship. The dispute culminated with Kompatscher vetoing Widman's candidacy within the SVP list ahead of the 2023 provincial election, leading to Widmann leaving the party and creating his own movement. Already in June 2023, Widmann proposed the "CDU/CSU model", two separate parties with a common program and a joint group.

The party ran on a regionalist and autonomist platform, stressing Widmann's positive results during his tenure as SVP secretary and claiming that the incumbent administration has failed in prioritizing the interests of the province. In the election, the party obtained 3.4% of the votes, allowing Widmann to retain his seat in the provincial council.

== Election results ==
=== Landtag of South Tyrol ===
Landtag of South Tyrol
Election	Leader	Votes	%	Seats	+/−
2023	Thomas Widmann	9,646	3.4	1 / 35	New

== Leadership ==
- Leader: Thomas Widmann (2023-present)
