= Autonomy House =

Autonomy House.eu Casa Autonomia.eu
- Abbreviation: CA
- President: Paola Demagri
- Vice president: Michele Dallapiccola
- Founded: 19 November 2022
- Split from: Trentino Tyrolean Autonomist Party
- Ideology: Regionalism; Christian democracy
- Political position: Centre
- National affiliation: Centre-left coalition
- Colors: Yellow
- Chamber of Deputies: 0 / 400
- Senate: 0 / 200
- European Parliament: 0 / 76
- Provincial council: 1 / 35

Website
- Official website

Autonomy House.eu (Italian: Casa Autonomia.eu, CA.eu) is a regionalist political party in Trentino.

== History ==
Since the 2018 general election, the Trentino Tyrolean Autonomist Party (PATT) moved away from the Centre-left coalition to the Blockfrei option in the 2018 provincial election with incumbent president Ugo Rossi as candidate. The election was won by Lega Trentino's candidate Maurizio Fugatti.

After the election, PATT and their sister party South Tyrolean People's Party (SVP) slowly approached the Centre-right coalition. SVP formed both the provincial and the regional government with Lega. In the 2019 European election, SVP–PATT allied with Forza Italia instead of their traditional partner the Democratic Party. In 2021 PATT's Lorenzo Ossanna joined the regional government, including the SVP, the LNT and Forza Italia. Between 2021 and 2022 three PATT provincial councillors out of four, Rossi, Paola Demagri and Michele Dallapiccola, left the party. In November 2022, Demagri and Dallapiccola formed Casa Autonomia.eu, aligned with the centre-left, leaving Ossanna as PATT's lone provincial councillor. Between 2021 and 2023 also several other leading members, notably including honorary presidents Luigi Panizza and Dario Pallaoro, left the party and joined CA. Rossi later became a CA supporter.

In the run-up of the 2023 provincial election, the PATT finally decided to support incumbent president Fugatti, thus forming a regionalist/centre-right coalition. Meanwhile, the centre-left coalition supported the independent Francesco Valduga. In the election, PATT and their allies obtained 8.2% of the vote and the election of three candidates, while CA won 4.3% and one seat for incumbent councillor Demagri.

In the 2024 European Parliament election, the party supported Action, which obtained 4.5% of the vote in the province.

== Election results ==
=== European Parliament ===
Election	Leader	Votes	%	Seats	+/–	EP Group
2024	Paola Demagri	Into Action		0 / 76	New	–

=== Provincial elections ===
Election	Leader	Votes	%	Seats	+/–
2023	Paola Demagri	9,968	4.3	1 / 35	New

== Leadership ==
- President: Paola Demagri (2023–present)
- Vice president: Michele Dallapiccola (2023–present)
