= CSES Mission =

Chinese–Italian space mission

CSES (China Seismo-Electromagnetic Satellite), or Zhangheng, is a Chinese–Italian space mission dedicated to monitoring electromagnetic field and waves, plasma parameters and particle fluxes induced by natural sources and artificial emitters in the near-Earth space. Austria contributes to one of the magnetometers.

== Overview ==
The mission aims to study the existence of possible (temporal and spatial) correlations between the observation of iono-magnetospheric perturbations as well as precipitation of particles from the inner Van Allen belts and the occurrence of seismic events. However, a careful analysis is needed in order to distinguish measurements possibly associated to earthquakes from the large background generated in the geomagnetic cavity by the solar activity and the tropospheric electromagnetic emissions.

CSES mission will investigate the structure and the dynamics of the topside ionosphere, the coupling mechanisms between upper atmosphere, ionosphere and magnetosphere and the temporal variations of the geomagnetic field, in quiet and disturbed conditions. Data collected by the mission will also allow to studying solar-terrestrial interactions and phenomena of solar physics, namely Coronal Mass Ejections (CMEs), solar flares and cosmic ray solar modulation. The mission will contribute to develop an observational sharing service for the international cooperation and the scientific community.

The mission is part of a collaboration program between the China National Space Administration (CNSA) and the Italian Space Agency (ASI). It is the result of joint studies between Chinese researchers of China Earthquake Administration (CEA), led by Professor Xuhui Shen, and Italian researchers of National Institute for Nuclear Physics (INFN) and other Institutes and Universities, led by Professor Roberto Battiston.

== Institutions ==
The Chinese institutes involved in the project are the China National Space Administration (CNSA), the China Earthquake Administration (CEA), the Lanzhou Institute of Physics (LIP), the Institute of Crustal Dynamics (ICD-CEA), the Institute of High Energy Physics (IHEP), the National Space Science Center (NSSC), the Centre for Space Science and Applied Research-Chinese Academy of Science (CSSAR-CAS), the Space Star Technology Co. and the DFH Satellite Co.

Italy participates to the CSES mission with the Limadou project, led by Prof. Piergiorgio Picozza (Principal Investigator), funded by the Italian Space Agency (ASI) and the National Institute for Nuclear Physics (INFN). The Limadou Collaboration includes the INFN Divisions of Bologna, Naples, Perugia, Roma Tor Vergata, the INFN Center TIFPA of Trento, the INFN National Laboratories of Frascati, the Universities of Bologna, Trento, Roma Tor Vergata, Uninettuno and the Institutes INAF-IAPS (Italian National Institute of Astrophysics and Planetology) and INGV (Italian National Institute of Geophysics and Volcanology).

The LIMADOU Collaboration has designed, built and tested the High Energy Particle Detector (HEPD) of the CSES mission, conceived for optimizing detection of energetic charged particles precipitating from the inner Van Allen belts (as a result of seismic and non-seismic electromagnetic perturbations); it has collaborated in developing and testing the Electronic Field Detector (EFD) in the INAF-IAPS plasma chamber in Rome, and it participates in the data analysis of all payloads of the CSES mission.

== Satellite and instruments ==
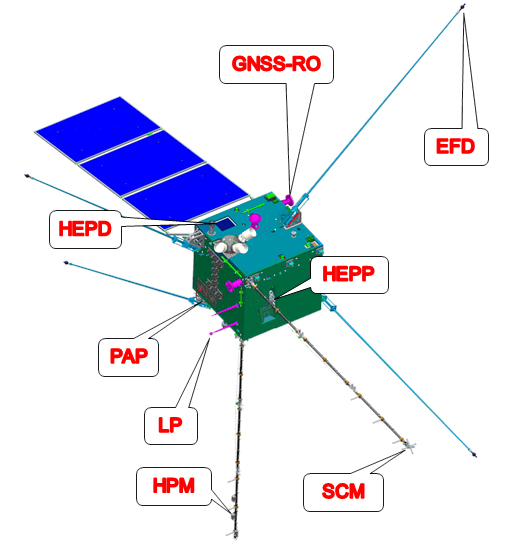
CSES Satellite. Payload Locations (the Tri-Band Beacon is hidden behind the satellite).

CSES is a 3-axes stabilized satellite, based on the Chinese CAST2000 platform, with a mass of about 730 kg and a peak of power consumption of about 900 W. Scientific data will be transmitted in X-band at 120 Mbit/s. The orbit is circular Sun-synchronous, at an altitude of about 500 km, an inclination of about 98°, and descending node at 14:00 LT.

The CSES payload includes: two particle detectors (the High-Energy Particle Detectors (HEPD) and the High-Energy Particle Package (HEPP)) to measure flux, energy spectrum, type and direction of impinging particles; a Search-Coil Magnetometer (SCM) and a High Precision Magnetometer (HPM) to measure the components and the total intensity of the magnetic field, respectively; a four probes Electric Field Detector (EFD) to measure the electric field components in a wide frequencies range; a Plasma analyzer Package (PAP) and a Langmuir probe (LP) to measure plasma parameters; a GNSS Occultation Receiver and a Tri-Band Beacon to measure the density of electrons and to perform ionospheric tomography.

The High Precision Magnetometer (HPM) is developed in cooperation between the National Space Science Center (NSSC) of the Chinese Academy of Sciences, the Space Research Institute (IWF) of the Austrian Academy of Sciences (ÖAW) and the Institute of Experimental Physics (IEP) of the Graz University of Technology. NSSC is responsible for the dual sensor fluxgate magnetometer, the instrument processor and the power supply unit, while IWF and IEP participate with a scalar magnetometer (CDSM).

Each instrument will collect data in two operating modes: ‘‘burst mode’’, activated when the satellite passes over China and the more seismic regions of the Earth, and ‘‘survey mode” for other areas of the planet.

There are two different orbital working zones: the ‘‘payload operating zone’’, for geomagnetic latitudes between -65° and +65° (where the instruments will collect data) and the ‘‘platform adjustment zone’’, at higher latitudes (where all detectors will be switched off to perform the satellite attitude control and the orbital maintenance activities).

=== Satellites ===
Satellite	Date (UTC)	Launch Vehicle	Serial number	Launch site	Orbit	Result	Notes
CSES-01 (Zhangheng 1)	2 February 2018; 07:51	Long March 2D	Y13	LA-4/SLS-2, JSLC	Low Earth (SSO)	Operational	
CSES-02 (Zhangheng 1-02)	14 June 2025; 07:56	Long March 2D	Y42	LA-4/SLS-2, JSLC	Low Earth (SSO)	Operational	Second CSES-Limadou satellite mission.

The first CSES-1 Satellite was launched from the Jiuquan Satellite Launch Center in the Gobi Desert (Inner Mongolia) on February 2, 2018. The launch of the second satellite CSES-2 is launched on June 14, 2025.
