= Roberto Battiston =

Italian physicist

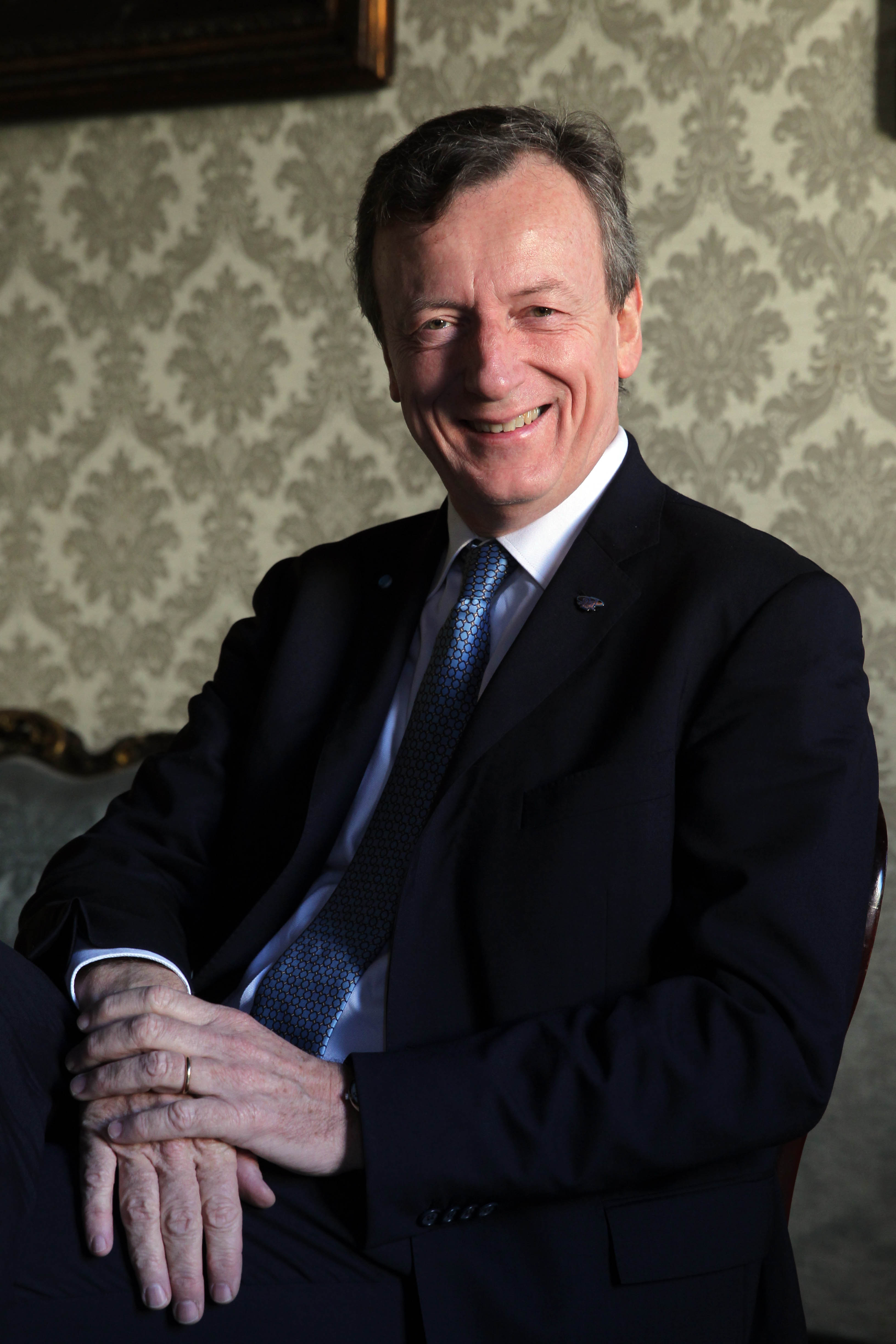
- Roberto Battiston in 2015 at ASI in Rome.
- Born: 8 November 1956; Trento, Italy
- Education: Scuola Normale Superiore di Pisa, Paris-Sud University
- Scientific career
- Workplaces: University of Perugia, University of Trento, Italian Space Agency, INFN

Roberto Battiston is an Italian physicist, specialized in the field of fundamental physics and elementary particles, and leading experts in the physics of cosmic rays. He was the president of the Italian Space Agency (ASI) from 2014 to 2018 and president of the Italian National Institute for Nuclear Physics (INFN) Committee on Astroparticle Physics from 2009 to 2014.

== Life ==
Battiston graduated in physics in 1979 at the Scuola Normale Superiore di Pisa with a thesis on the production of muons in proton-proton interactions at the CERN ISR, under the supervision of Nobel Prize laureate Samuel C. C. Ting and of Prof. Giorgio Bellettini. He went on to receive a fellowship at the Ecole Normale de Rue D’Ulm in Paris and was awarded a Doctorate at University of Paris XI, Orsay.

From 1983 to 2012, he was first researcher and then, from 1993, full professor in physics at University of Perugia. In 2009, he was elected for a three-years mandate as president of the National Commission for Astroparticle Physics of the National Institute of Nuclear Physics (INFN). He moved in 2012 he moved to the Department of Physics of the University of Trento, where he holds the chair in Experimental Physics and where he contributed in founding the new INFN National Center, TIFPA (Trento Institute for Fundamental Physics and Applications), devoted to space physics and technology in the astroparticle sector.

On 16 May 2014, following a competitive selection by an international committee, he was appointed by Minister Stefania Giannini President of the Italian Space Agency (ASI) for 2014–2018.

== Scientific contributions ==
=== Particle Physics ===
In 1990 he started a collaboration with the Nobel laureate Samuel Ting on the L3 experiment at the LEP of CERN, designing and constructing a high-precision silicon detector to detect particles with a very short lifetime.

=== Alpha Magnetic Spectrometer ===
From 1995 to 2014, his scientific activity was mainly devoted to a new area of research, astroparticle physics, with advanced elementary particle detectors used to characterize primordial antimatter and dark matter, two important open issues of modern astrophysics and cosmology. He participated to the design and construction of the Alpha Magnetic Spectrometer (AMS) in the role of deputy spokesperson. After the successful engineering mission on the Space Shuttle (AMS-01), the final version, AMS-02, was installed on the International Space Station in 2011 and has been collecting data ever since.

=== CSES (China Seismo-Electromagnetic Satellite) - LIMADOU ===
Since 2007, he coordinates the Italian delegation in the joint Sino-Italian development of the Chinese satellite CSES, dedicated to the development of new techniques for the monitoring of seismic phenomena from space. The launch of the satellite, which took place in 2018, opens up new perspectives in the field of Earth observation from space and will be followed by a second satellite in 2022.

=== Space and Industrial Policy ===
==== ASI presidency ====
Under his presidency of the ASI, important programs involving the Agency were launched:

- completion of the financing and construction of the COSMO-SkyMed Second Generation (satellites 1 and 2),
- completion and construction of the PRISMA multispectral satellite
- launch of the PLATiNO (Small High-Tech Satellites) program aimed at developing industrial capacity in the low-mass satellite sector
- launch of the first European Venture Capital space fund
- creation of the Edoardo Amaldi Foundation devoted to technology transfer in the space sector

=== Publications ===
As of August 25, 2020, Web of Science reports Battiston as author of 486 published papers, with 17.350 citations received and an H index of 58.

Battiston is a columnist for La Stampa, L'Adige, La Repubblica, and he wrote for a long time the "Astri e Particelle" ("Stars and Particles") section in Le Scienze (Italian version of Scientific American). He also authored the following books:

- Dialogo tra un artista ed uno scienziato [Dialogue between an artist and a scientist] (in Italian). Perugia: Futura. 2012. ISBN 978-8897720218.
- La meccanica quantistica. Per chi non ne sa nulla [Quantum mechanics for those who don't know anything about it] (in Italian). Rome: Castelvecchi. 2018. ISBN 978-8832821161.
- Fare spazio. I miei anni all'Agenzia Spaziale Italiana [Making space. My years at the Italian Space Agency] (in Italian). Milano: La nave di Teseo. 2019. ISBN 978-8893448826.
- La prima alba del cosmo [The first dawn of the cosmos] (in Italian). Milano: Rizzoli. 2019. ISBN 9788817141901.
- La matematica del virus. I numeri per capire e sconfiggere la pandemia [Mathematics of virus. The numbers to understand and defeat the pandemic] (in Italian). Rome: Castelvecchi. 2020.

== Awards and acknowledgments ==
- Asteroid 21256 Robertobattiston was named after him
- Awardee of the ASAS Space Economy 2017 prize by the Association for ICT Services, Applications and Technologies for Space
- Recipient of the 2017 GAL Hassin Prize, together with the astrophysicist Nicolò D'Amico
- Awardee of the Vladimir Syromniatnikov IAASS prize (2017)
- Second Italian ever, in 2019, to enter the Hall of Fame of the International Astronautical Federation
- Awardee of the "International Science and Technology Cooperation Award" by the Chinese government (2019)

=== Honors ===
- Italy: Commendatore of the Order of Merit for Labour (2018)
- France: Knight of the Order of the Legion of Honor (2017)
