= Team K =

Regionalist political party in South Tyrol, Italy

- Leader: Paul Köllensperger
- Founded: 10 July 2018
- Split from: Five Star Movement
- Ideology: Regionalism; Liberalism; Social liberalism
- Political position: Centre to centre-left
- National affiliation: More Europe
- European affiliation: ALDE Party
- Chamber of Deputies: 0 / 400 (0%)
- Senate: 0 / 205 (0%)
- European Parliament: 0 / 76 (0%)
- Provincial Council: 4 / 35

Website
- team-k.eu

Team K (TK), named Team Köllensperger from its establishment in July 2018 to November 2019, is a political party of Italy active in South Tyrol, where it seeks to be an inter-ethnic centrist party. Led by Paul Köllensperger, it is politically regionalist, liberal, and social-liberal.

The party, which is close to NEOS – The New Austria and Liberal Forum (NEOS), a like-minded liberal party, is an observer member of the Alliance of Liberals and Democrats for Europe Party (ALDE) and formed a pact with More Europe (+Eu) for the 2019 European Parliament election in Italy. In addition to social-liberal and environmentalist policies, TK advocates a pro-European stance, and is supportive of direct democracy.

== History ==
The party was established on the 10 July 2018 by Paul Köllensperger, a member of the Landtag of South Tyrol. Köllensperger was elected in the Landtag after the 2013 provincial election within the Five Star Movement (M5S). In July 2018, he left the party accusing its leadership of not being interested in promoting enough South Tyrol's local interests and that it was necessary to establish a new party aimed at representing all the South Tyroleans looking for an inter-ethnic centrist party and aiming at breaking the absolute majority of the South Tyrolean People's Party (SVP). In the 2018 provincial election the party obtained a successful 15.2% of the vote, arriving second after the SVP.

In the run-up to the 2019 European Parliament election in Trentino-Alto Adige/Südtirol, TK, which affirmed to be taking inspiration from Austria's NEOS party, joined the ALDE party. Consequently, it formed a pact with +Eu, ALDE's member party in Italy, and proposed Renate Holzeisen as its candidate. The list came third with 11.2% of the vote in South Tyrol and Holzeisen was the second most-voted candidate in the province, gaining nearly 23,000 votes; she did not succeed in being elected as the list did not pass the 4% country-level electoral threshold. Holzeisen later left the party and joined and joined Vita, focusing on opposing COVID-19 vaccines.

In the 2023 provincial election, the party obtained 11.1% of the vote, while Holzeisen-led Vita won 2.6%.

In the 2024 European Parliament election, the party ran within Action, with Köllensperger as its candidate, and obtained 6.8% of the vote.

== Election results ==
=== Landtag of South Tyrol ===
Landtag of South Tyrol
Election	Leader	Votes	%	Seats	+/−
2018	Paul Köllensperger	43,315 (2nd)	15.2	6 / 35	New
2023	Paul Köllensperger	31,201 (2nd)	11.1	4 / 35	▼2

=== European Parliament ===
Election	Leader	Votes	%	Seats	+/–	EP Group
2019	Paul Köllensperger	Into More Europe		0 / 76	New	–
2024	Paul Köllensperger	Into Action		0 / 76	0	–

== Leadership ==
- Leader: Paul Köllensperger (2018–present)
