= 2019 European Parliament election in Trentino-Alto Adige/Südtirol =

The European Parliament election of 2019 took place in Italy on 26 May 2019.

Lega Nord (PD), which came first also at the country-level, was by far the most voted list in Trentino (37.7%), while the South Tyrolean People's Party (SVP) was by far the largest party in South Tyrol (46.5%). SVP's Herbert Dorfmann, the outgoing two-term MEP, was largely the most voted candidate in the region (95,753 preference votes), followed by Matteo Salvini (Lega Nord, 43,321), Roberto Battiston (PD, 23,788), Renate Holzeisen (Team K–More Europe, 22,930) and Norbert Lantschner (Greens–Green Europe, 9,825). Dorfmann was the only candidate from the region to be elected (in his case, re-elected) to the European Parliament.

== Results ==
Trentino

Party	Votes	%
Lega Nord	95,182	37.7
Democratic Party	63,580	25.2
Five Star Movement	21,987	8.7
South Tyrolean People's Party	16,436	6.5
Forza Italia	13,362	5.3
Brothers of Italy	12,729	5.1
Green Europe	10,413	4.1
More Europe	7,812	3.1
The Left	4,019	1.6
others	6,700	2.7
Total	252,220	100.00

Source: Ministry of the Interior

South Tyrol

Party	Votes	%
South Tyrolean People's Party	113,.359	46.5
Lega Nord	42,557	17.5
More Europe	27,232	11.2
Green Europe	21,148	8.7
Democratic Party	15,749	6.5
Five Star Movement	9,180	3.8
Forza Italia	4,225	1.7
Brothers of Italy	3,966	1.6
The Left	1,950	0.8
others	4,224	1.7
Total	243,590	100.00

Source: Ministry of the Interior
