= Vita (electoral list) =

Life Vita
- Leader: Sara Cunial
- Founders: Sara Cunial; Edoardo Polacco
- Founded: 1 August 2022
- Headquarters: Via Nemorense, 93 – Rome
- Ideology: Populism; Anti-establishment; Factions: COVID-19 scepticism Anti-vaccination; Anti-5G; Anti-immigration; Sovereigntism; Anti-gender; Anti-GMF
- Political position: Big tent
- National affiliation: Freedom (2024)
- Member parties: R2020; M3V; NPD; SdC; Stop 5G; UPIL; ENZIAN; PdM
- Colours: Blue
- Regional Councils: 1 / 896 (Note: Renate Holzeisen in Trentino-Alto Adige/Südtirol.)

Website
- votalavita.it

Vita (lit. 'Life') is an Italian electoral list which ran in the 2022 general election. It is led by Sara Cunial, a member of the Chamber of Deputies and former member of the Five Star Movement (M5S). The list includes anti-vaccine, anti-5G, anti-immigration and anti-gender movements, such as R2020, 3V Movement, No Fear Day, Sentinels of the Constitution - I'm with the Lawyer Polacco, The Italian People, People of Mothers, Italian Alliance Stop 5G, Popular Union for Free Italy and ENZIAN-Südtirol.

The founders describe the list as "a new open and inclusive political and social community", and "a list of those who, in these two years, have stood firm, loyal and courageous against the techno-sanitary dictatorship and the restriction of our natural and constitutional rights."

== History ==
At the end of July 2022, the program of the list was published, among the points of which are: rejection of the green pass, freedom of information, alternative forms of education, constitutional freedoms, restoration of national sovereignty and freedom of business.

On 1 August, a press conference was held on the submission of a unitary list. After reaching the 36,000 signatures required for running, the list participated in the 2022 general election, obtaining about 0.7% of the vote.

Many members, dissatisfied with the results, left the list.

The list gained its first elected representative at the regional/provincial level in the 2023 South Tyrolean provincial election, obtaining 2.6% of the vote and electing lawyer Renate Holzeisen to the provincial parliament.

== Composition ==
Party	Ideology	Leader
R2020	COVID-19 scepticism	Sara Cunial
3V Movement (M3V) ^{a}	Anti-vaccination	Luca Teodori
No Paura Day (NPD) ^{a}	Anti-green pass	Gaetano Rotondo
Sentinels of the Constitution (SdC)	Populism	Edoardo Polacco
Stop 5G Italian Alliance (AIS5G) ^{a}	Anti-5G	Maurizio Martucci
Popular Union for Free Italy (UPIL)	Anti-elitism	Enrico Montesano
ENZIAN-Südtirol (ENZIAN) ^{a}	South Tyrol regionalism	Josef Unterholzner
People of Mothers (PdM)	Anti-gender	Tiziana Coppola

^{a} Left following the results of the 2022 general election.

== Election results ==
=== Italian Parliament ===
Election	Leader	Chamber of Deputies				Senate of the Republic				Government
Election	Leader	Votes	%	Seats	+/–	Votes	%	Seats	+/–	Government
2022	Sara Cunial	201,540	0.72	0 / 400	New	196,656	0.71	0 / 200	New	No seats

=== European Parliament ===
Election	Leader	Votes	%	Seats	+/–	EP Group
2024	Sara Cunial	Into Freedom		0 / 76	New	–

=== Regional Councils ===
Region	Election year	Votes	%	Seats	+/−	Status in legislature
South Tyrol	2023	7.223	2,57	1 / 35	New	Opposition
Veneto	2025	Into Resist Veneto		0 / 51	New	No seats
