= Lega Alto Adige Südtirol =

- Secretary: Paolo Zenorini
- Founded: 1991
- Ideology: Regionalism; Libertarianism; Populism
- National affiliation: Lega Nord (1991–2020); Lega per Salvini Premier (2020–present)
- Provincial Council: 0 / 35
- Chamber of Deputies (South Tyrol seats): 0 / 4
- Senate (South Tyrol seats): 0 / 4

Lega Alto Adige – Südtirol (English: League Alto Adige – South Tyrol, LAAST), whose official name is Lega Alto Adige per Salvini Premier (English: League Alto Adige for Salvini Premier), is a regionalist political party active in South Tyrol. The party was a "national" section of Lega Nord (LN) from 1991 to 2020 and became the regional section of Lega per Salvini Premier (LSP) in South Tyrol in 2020.

Like Team K and the Greens, the LAAST is an inter-ethnic party.

== History ==
=== Foundation and early years ===
The party was established in Bolzano in 1991 and obtained 3.6% of the vote in the 1992 general election. The party's first and founding national secretary was Umberto Montefiori, who was elected to the Provincial Council in the 1993 regional election, when the party obtained 3.0% of the vote. Montefiori, a retired official of the Carabinieri and close ally of Irene Pivetti, disagreed with Lega Nord's separatist turn after the 1996 general election and, along with Pivetti, left the party shortly after. Montefiori would serve as president of the Provincial Council from 1996 to 1998.

In 1997 the party, deprived of its most recognisable leader and only provincial councillor, was trying to join forces with "Alliance 98", formed by Christian Waldner after his ejection from Die Freiheitlichen (dF) in 1994, when Waldner was shot dead by Peter Paul Reiner, a former political ally who had remained a leading member of dF. The event brought down the only chance that LNAAST had at the time to flourish again. In the 1998 provincial election the party thus obtained a mere 0.9% of the vote. The result of 2003 was even worse: 0.5% of the vote. This was enough for LN's federal leadership to find ways in order to enlarge the party toward the 2008 provincial election.

=== Enlarging the party's tent ===
In the 2008 provincial election, the LNAAST fielded a heterogenous list with both Italian- and German-speaking candidates. In the run-up to the election the party was joined by Roland Atz, former Vice President of the Trentino-Alto Adige/Südtirol Region and leading member of the South Tyrolean People's Party (SVP), Elena Artioli, another SVP splinter and one of the few multilingual members of that party before it restricted its membership to German- and Ladin-speakers, and Paolo Bassani, a centrist politician who had been previously member of the Italian Liberal Party, Forza Italia and finally the Italian Republican Party. This strategy, designed by minister and LN's coordinator of national sections Roberto Calderoli, prompted Kurt Pancheri to resign from national secretary and the party altogether. In the election the LNAAST won the 2.1% of the vote and Artioli was elected to the Provincial Council.

In January 2013 Artioli was elected national secretary of the party, ending five years of transitional leadership provided by the federal party. In May she announced that the party would run in the 2013 provincial election as part of the Team Autonomies / Team Artioli (Team A), a broader autonomist and inter-ethnic electoral list largely inspired to the Austrian Team Stronach. Later, in September, the Team A was integrated into the "Forza Alto Adige–Lega Nord–Team Autonomies" list, along with The People of Freedom. In the October election the list took 2.5% of the vote and Artioli was the only candidate elected. In January 2014, at the very beginning of the Council term, Artioli voted in favour of SVP's Arno Kompatscher in a vote of confidence, consequently left the party and finally joined the Democratic Party, becoming the local coordinator of Liberal PD in Bolzano.

In the run-up of the 2014 European Parliament election the LN formed a pact with dF, according to which the dF's symbol and candidates were included in the party's slates. In the 2015 municipal election in Bolzano, for mayor, the LNAAST supported Carlo Vettori, who had joined the party just two years before and styled himself as a strong supporter of the party's "inter-ethnic" identity. Vettori gained 11.0% of the vote and was excluded from the run-off for less than 2 pp. In Laives LNAAST's Christian Bianchi was elected mayor with the support of the SVP and the Five Star Movement (M5S). The new course and, especially, Artioli's exit brought Pancheri back into the party's fold. Bolzano returned to vote in 2016: the LNAAST, that tried to forge an alliance with the SVP and finally supported a joint centre-right candidate, was reduced to 9.0%. Vettori switched to Forza Italia in 2021.

In the 2018 general election the party won 9.6%, as part of a general surge of the federal party.

=== Provincial government ===
In the 2018 provincial election the party won 11.1%, its best result ever in the province. After the election, it joined forces with the SVP as junior partner in the provincial government. Giuliano Vettorato and Massimo Bessone were appointed vice president and minister, respectively.

The party increased its tally to 17.5% in the 2019 European Parliament election.

Following the formation of Lega per Salvini Premier and the 2019 federal congress of the LN, after which the latter became practically inactive, in February 2020 the LNAAST was re-established as Lega Alto Adige Südtirol (LAAST) in order to become the regional section of the new party. The founding members of the new LAAST were Vettorato, Filippo Maturi and Sergio Armanini.

In the 2023 provincial election the party was reduced to 3.0% of the vote, due to the low turnout by Italian-speakers and the competition from Brothers of Italy (FdI). The party's only elected councillor was Laives mayor Christian Bianchi, who was later appointed minister in Kompatscher's third government, which comprised the SVP, FdI and dF. In April 2024 Paolo Zenorini was elected secretary of the party. In January 2025 Bianchi, who had not officially joined the party, switched to Forza Italia and became its provincial leader.

== Ideology ==
LNAAST/LAAST has presented itself as a party "inspired by the principles of Christianity" and the culture of Mitteleuropa, representing South Tyroleans, regardless their language or ethnicity, including multilingual people. In fact, according to its program, the main goals of the party is to enhance the collaboration and the interaction of the three language groups (Italian, German and Ladin) and to legally recognize the reality of multilingual people (i.e. citizens who identify with two linguistic identities). The party, which classifies itself as "neither right-wing nor left-wing", professes also a libertarian credo and one of its slogans is "less Province, more private", while emphasizing family, education and health-care issues.

== Popular support ==
The party is a tiny one compared to other "national sections" of Lega Nord / Lega. Its results in the Province of Bolzano are shown in the tables below.

1992 general	1993 provincial	1994 general	1996 general	1998 provincial	1999 European	2001 general	2003 provincial	2004 European	2006 general	2008 general	2008 provincial	2009 European
3.6	3.0	2.4	4.3	0.9	0.5	0.6	0.5	0.7	0.9	2.0	2.1	4.8

2013 general	2013 provincial	2014 European	2018 general	2018 provincial	2019 European	2022 general	2023 provincial	2024 European
0.9	2.5 (Note: Joint list with Forza Alto Adige.)	6.0 (Note: Joint list with Die Freiheitlichen.)	9.6	11.1	17.5	5.3	3.0	3.3

== Leadership ==
- Secretary: Umberto Montefiori (1991–1996), Rolando Fontan (commissioner 1996–2000), Kurt Pancheri (2000–2001), Sergio Divina (commissioner, 2001–2007), Maurizio Fugatti (commissioner, 2007-2010), Maurizio Bosatra (commissioner, 2010–2012), Matteo Bragantini (commissioner, 2012–2013), Elena Artioli (2013–2014), Maurizio Fugatti (commissioner, 2014–2017), Massimo Bessone (commissioner, 2017–2019), Maurizio Bosatra (commissioner, 2019–2020), Giuliano Vettorato (commissioner, 2020–2023), Maurizio Bosatra (commissioner, 2023–2024), Paolo Zenorini (2024–present)
- President: unknown (1991–1999) Sergio Tamajo (1999–2008), Andrea Gallo (2013–2014)
