= Greens (South Tyrol) =

Greens Verdi–Grüne–Vërc
- Spokespersons: Zeno Oberkofler; Kathrin Werth
- Founded: 1978
- Headquarters: Via Bottai/Bindergasse 5 39100 Bolzano
- Newspaper: Cactus
- Youth wing: Young Greens South Tyrol
- Ideology: Green politics Eco-socialism; Social democracy
- National affiliation: Greens (1990–2013); SA (2008 election); SL (2009 EP election); SEL (2013 election); AET (2014 EP election); SI (2015–2018); LeU (2018 election); EV (2019 EP election); AVS (2022 election)
- European affiliation: European Green Party
- European Parliament group: Green Group (1989–1995); Greens–EFA (1999–2009)
- International affiliation: Global Greens
- Chamber of Deputies: 0 / 400
- Senate: 1 / 205
- European Parliament: 0 / 76
- Provincial Council: 3 / 35

Website
- verdi.bz.it

The Greens (Verdi–Grüne–Vërc) are a green (with eco-socialist and self-proclaimed social-democratic tendencies) political party active in South Tyrol, northern Italy. Once the provincial section of the Federation of the Greens, the party is now autonomous and often forms different alliances at the country-level, but both joined Green Europe, a coalition of green parties for the 2019 European Parliament election, and the Greens and Left Alliance, a coalition with Italian Left for the 2022 general election.

The Greens are inter-ethnic and strive to improve relations between the three language groups of the Province: Italian-, German- and Ladin-speakers. Since 2026, the party's spokespersons have been Zeno Oberkofler and Kathrin Werth.

== History ==
The Greens have their roots in the New Left and the environmental movements of the 1970s. They started to compete in elections in 1978, but were formally registered as a party only in 1996. From 1978 to 1996 they used different names: New Left (1978), Alternative List (1983), Green Alternative List (1988) and finally Greens (since 1993). Alexander Langer, founder and early leader of the party, committed suicide in 1995.

Other than in the Landtag of South Tyrol since 1978, the party was successively represented in the European Parliament by long-time activist Langer (1989–1995), mountaineer Reinhold Messner (1999–2004) and theologian Sepp Kusstatscher (2004–2009).

In the 2003 provincial election, the party obtained 7.9% of the vote and three provincial councillors: Cristina Kury, Kusstatscher (a former member of the South Tyrolean People's Party, SVP) and Hans Heiss. In the 2004 European Parliament election, the Greens won 13.1% of the vote in the Province, their best result ever, and sent Kusstatscher to the European Parliament, replacing Messner.

In the 2008 provincial election, the Greens won only the 5.8% of the vote, losing votes (-2.1%) and one seat from 2003. The two elected Green councillors were Heiss and Riccardo Dello Sbarba, who succeeded to Kusstatscher.

In the 2013 general election, the Greens did not follow the national party into the Civil Revolution alliance and decided instead to support Left Ecology Freedom (SEL), whose regional slate included Green Florian Kronbichler, who was the first German-speaker to be elected not for the SVP.

In the 2013 provincial election, the Greens won 8.7% of the vote (+2.9%), their record high in a provincial election, and sent three elects to the Provincial Council: Heiss, Dello Sbarba and Brigitte Foppa. In the 2014 European Parliament election the Greens supported The Other Europe, an electoral alliance launched by Italian Left (SI, successor of SEL) and other left-wing parties, but its candidate Oktavia Brugger was not elected. In the 2015 municipal election in Merano, the second-largest South Tyrolean city, Green Paul Rösch was elected mayor with 60.7% of the vote in the run-off: it was the first time that the Greens were to win a large municipality.

In the 2018 general election, Kronbichler did not stand again and the Greens continued to join forces with SI within the Free and Equal electoral list, with Norbert Lantschner as its standard-bearer. Lantschner was not elected and the Greens lost their representation in Parliament.

In the 2018 provincial election, the Greens won 6.8% of the vote (-1.9pp) and again sent three elects to the Provincial Council. In the 2019 European Parliament election, the Greens joined the Green Europe (EV) electoral list, with Norbert Lantschner as their candidate, garnering 8.7% of the vote. In November 2019 the party became a full member of the European Green Party.

In July 2022, at a convention in Rome, spokesperson Marlene Pernstich participated the "New Energies" convention, that launched what would become the Greens and Left Alliance (AVS), a joint list for the 2022 general election formed by EV and SI. In the election, the party obtained 7.7% of the vote in the Province.

In the 2023 provincial election, the Greens won 9.1% of the vote (+2.2pp) and again sent three elects to the Provincial Council. In the 2024 European Parliament election the Greens ran as part of AVS, with Foppa as standard-bearer, garnering 15.8% of the vote.

In February 2025 senator Aurora Floridia (EV/AVS), elected in Veneto, joined the Greens of South Tyrol and For the Autonomies group.

== Popular support ==
The Greens' best result in a provincial election was in 2023, when the party won 9.1% of the vote. In that occasion, the Greens obtained their highest share in Urtijëi (20.3%), but it generally ran strong in the largest cities and towns (12.8% in Merano, 11.7% in Bolzano, 10.3% in Bruneck and 10.1% in Brixen), while doing worse in the most rural districts – Wipptal (4.2%), Pustertal (6.3%) and Vinschgau (6.5%). The party's best result was in the 2024 European Parliament election, where it received 15.8% of the vote.

The electoral results of the Greens in South Tyrol since 1987 are shown in the table below.

1987 general	1988 provinc.	1989 European	1992 general	1993 provinc.	1994 general	1994 European	1996 general	1998 provinc.	1999 European	2001 general	2003 provinc.
4.6 (Note: Within the Federation of the Greens.)	6.7	7.3	6.6	6.9	5.4	8.9	5.4	6.5	6.7	5.5 (Note: Within The Sunflower.)	7.9

2004 European	2006 general	2008 general	2008 provinc.	2009 European	2013 general	2013 provinc.	2014 European	2018 general	2018 provinc.	2019 European	2022 general
13.1	6.6	3.3 (Note: Within The Left – The Rainbow.)	5.8	10.9 (Note: Within Left and Freedom.)	5.2 (Note: Within Left Ecology Freedom.)	8.7	9.9 (Note: Within The Other Europe.)	5.1 (Note: Within Free and Equal.)	6.8	8.7 (Note: Within Green Europe.)	7.7 (Note: Within Greens and Left Alliance.)

2023 provinc.	2024 European
9.1	15.8

=== Landtag of South Tyrol ===
Landtag of South Tyrol
Election	Votes	%	Seats	+/−
1978	9,753	3.7	2 / 35	▲2
1983	12,942	4.5	2 / 35	–
1988	20,549	6.7	2 / 35	–
1993	21,293	6.9	2 / 35	–
1998	19,965	6.5	2 / 35	–
2003	23,708	7.9	3 / 35	▲1
2008	17,743	5.8	2 / 35	▼1
2013	25,067	8.7	3 / 35	▲1
2018	19,391	6.8	3 / 35	–
2023	25,445	9.1	3 / 35	–

== Symbols ==
Up to 2018

2018–

== Leadership ==
Spokesperson: Carlo Bertorelle (1996–1998), Leander Moroder (1998–2006), Franco Bernard (2006–2009), Sepp Kusstatscher and Brigitte Foppa (2009–2013), Giorgio Zanvettor and Brigitte Foppa (2014–2016), Hans Heiss and Brigitte Foppa (2016–2017), Tobias Planer and Brigitte Foppa (2017–2019), Felix Wohlgemuth and Marlene Pernstich (2019–2024), Luca Bertolini and Elide Mussner (2024–2026), Zeno Oberkofler and Kathrin Werth (2026–present)

== Sources ==
- Provincial Council of Bolzano – Historical Archive
- Trentino Alto-Adige Region – Elections
- Provincial Government of Bolzano – Elections
- Cattaneo Institute – Archive of Election Data
- Ministry of the Interior – Historical Archive of Elections
- Günther Pallaver, Political parties in Alto Adige from 1945 to 2005
- Hermann Atz, Die Grünen Südtirols. Profil und Wählerbasis, StudienVerlag, Innsbruck/Vienna/Bolzano 2007, ISBN 978-3-7065-4070-4.
- Joachim Gatterer, "rote milben im gefieder". Sozialdemokratische, kommunistische und grün-alternative Parteipolitik in Südtirol, StudienVerlag, Innsbruck/Vienna/Bolzano 2009, ISBN 978-3-7065-4648-5
