= Politics of Sicily =

The Politics of Sicily, Italy takes place in the framework of an "anomalous presidential" representative democracy or prime-ministerial system with an executive presidency, whereby the President of Regional Government is the head of government, and of a pluriform multi-party system. Executive power is exercised by the Regional Government. Legislative power is vested in both the government and the Sicilian Regional Assembly.

== Political history ==
The oldest organized party of Sicily was the Sicilian Socialist Party, founded out from the Fasci Siciliani in 1893 as part of the emerging Italian Socialist Party, but the region was primarily a stronghold of the liberal establishment (see Historical Right, Historical Left and Liberals) that governed Italy for decades. However, by the end of the 19th century, Sicily elected several deputies from left-wing parties, namely the Radical Party, the Italian Republican Party, the Italian Socialist Party and the Italian Reformist Socialist Party.

After Italian Fascism (whose partisan arm, the National Fascist Party was well supported in the region) and the Allied invasion of Sicily during the World War II, Sicily increasingly became a stronghold of Christian Democracy, in opposition to the Italian Communist Party. Sicilians had also a penchant for conservative/nationalist politics, represented mainly by the Monarchist National Party and the Italian Social Movement.

After the dissolution of these parties, in the early 1990s, the region was long governed by a " center-right coalition", notably including the Union of Christian and Centre Democrats, whose regional leader, Salvatore Cuffaro, served as President of Sicily from 2001 to 2008, Silvio Berlusconi's Forza Italia and the post-fascist National Alliance. Cuffaro's Christian Democrats have since been the main party of government in Sicily as they had been part of both of the administrations of Raffaele Lombardo of the Movement for the Autonomies (2008–2012) and that of Rosario Crocetta of the Democratic Party (since 2012). 3

== Executive branch ==
The Regional Cabinet (Giunta Regionale) is presided by the President of the Region (Presidente della Regione), who is elected for a five-year term, and is currently composed by 11 members: the President and 10 regional assessors (Assessori, literally "aldermen"), including a Vice President (Vice Presidente).

Originally appointed by the Sicilian Regional Assembly, since 2001 de jure, he is elected by popular vote every five years under universal suffrage: the candidate who receives a plurality of votes, is elected.

His office is connected to the Regional Assembly (ARS), which is elected contextually: one fifth of the assembly seats are generally reserved to his supporters, which are wholesale elected concurrently with the President. The Assembly and the President are linked by an alleged relationship of confidence: if the President resigns or he is dismissed by the Assembly, a snap election is called for both the legislative and the executive offices, because in no case the two bodies can be chosen separately. The popular election of the President and the relationship of confidence between him and the legislature, allow to identify the Sicilian model of government as a particular form of semi-presidential system.

The President of Sicily promulgates regional laws and regulations. He can receive special administrative functions by the national government. The President is one of the 90 members of the Regional Assembly and, in this capacity, he can propose new laws. He appoints and dismiss the Regional Cabinet (called Giunta Regionale in Italian). The Cabinet is composed by regional assessors (assessori, literally "aldermen") who can be members of the Council at the same time. Assessors should not be confused with the ministers: according to Italian administrative law, assessors only receive delegations from the President to rule a bureau or an agency, the Region being a single legal person, not divided in ministries. One assessor can be appointed vice president. The President can also appoint four under-secretaries (sottosegretari) to help the President in his functions.

The Regional Cabinet prepares the budget, appoints the boards of public regional agencies and companies, manages assets, develops projects of governance, and resorts to the Constitutional Court of Italy if it thinks that a national law may violate regional powers. The President and the Cabinet are two different authorities of the Region: in matters within its competence, the Cabinet has the power to vote to give its approval.

=== List of presidents ===
The current President of Sicily is Renato Schifani, who is serving for his first term after winning the 2022 regional election.

Elected by the Regional Council (1947–2001)

№	Name	Term of office		Political party	Legislature
1	Giuseppe Alessi	30 May 1947	13 June 1949	DC	I (1947)
2	Franco Restivo	13 June 1949	20 July 1951	DC	I (1947)
2	Franco Restivo	20 July 1951	4 June 1955	DC	II (1951)
(1)	Giuseppe Alessi	4 June 1955	4 April 1956	DC	III (1955)
3	Giuseppe La Loggia	4 April 1956	13 May 1958	DC	III (1955)
4	Silvio Milazzo	13 May 1958	12 August 1959	DC / USCS	III (1955)
4	Silvio Milazzo	12 August 1959	23 February 1960	DC / USCS	IV (1959)
5	Benedetto della Nicchiara	23 February 1960	8 September 1961	DC	IV (1959)
6	Giuseppe D'Angelo	8 September 1961	25 July 1963	DC	IV (1959)
6	Giuseppe D'Angelo	25 July 1963	4 August 1964	DC	V (1963)
7	Francesco Coniglio	4 August 1964	11 August 1967	DC	V (1963)
8	Vincenzo Carollo	11 August 1967	20 September 1969	DC	VI (1967)
9	Mario Fasino	20 September 1969	10 August 1971	DC	VI (1967)
9	Mario Fasino	10 August 1971	22 December 1972	DC	VII (1971)
10	Vincenzo Giummarra	22 December 1972	26 March 1974	DC	VII (1971)
11	Angelo Bonfiglio	26 March 1974	13 August 1976	DC	VII (1971)
11	Angelo Bonfiglio	13 August 1976	20 March 1978	DC	VIII (1976)
12	Piersanti Mattarella	20 March 1978	6 January 1980	DC	VIII (1976)
13	Mario D'Acquisto	6 January 1980	7 August 1981	DC	VIII (1976)
13	Mario D'Acquisto	7 August 1981	23 December 1982	DC	IX (1981)
14	Calogero Lo Giudice	23 December 1982	19 October 1983	DC	IX (1981)
15	Santi Nicita	19 October 1983	21 March 1984	DC	IX (1981)
16	Modesto Sardo	21 March 1984	1 February 1985	DC	IX (1981)
17	Rino Nicolosi	1 February 1985	12 August 1986	DC	IX (1981)
17	Rino Nicolosi	12 August 1986	12 August 1991	DC	X (1986)
18	Vincenzo Leanza	12 August 1991	16 July 1992	DC	XI (1991)
19	Giuseppe Campione	16 July 1992	21 December 1993	DC	XI (1991)
20	Francesco Martino	21 December 1993	16 May 1995	PLI	XI (1991)
21	Matteo Graziano	16 May 1995	18 July 1996	PPI	XI (1991)
22	Giuseppe Provenzano	18 July 1996	20 January 1998	FI	XII (1996)
23	Giuseppe Drago	20 January 1998	21 November 1998	CCD	XII (1996)
24	Angelo Capodicasa	21 November 1998	26 July 2000	DS	XII (1996)
(18)	Vincenzo Leanza	26 July 2000	17 July 2001	FI	XII (1996)

Directly-elected presidents (since 2001)

N.	President	Term of office		Tenure (Years and days)	Party	Coalition	Legislature
25	Salvatore Cuffaro (1958– )	17 July 2001	15 June 2006	6 years, 193 days	CCD / UDC	FI–AN–CDC–CDU–NPSI	XIII (2001)
25	Salvatore Cuffaro (1958– )	15 June 2006	26 January 2008 (Note: Resigned after being sentenced five years in prison for aiding and abetting the Mafia. His deputy Nicola Leanza (UDC) held the office till a new regional election was called.)	6 years, 193 days	CCD / UDC	FI–UDC–MpA–AN	XIV (2006)
26	Raffaele Lombardo (1950– )	28 April 2008	10 November 2012 (Note: Resigned on 31 July 2012 after being under investigation for external contribution with Mafia and pork-barrelling. Remained in office as Acting President till a new regional election was called.)	4 years, 196 days	MpA	PdL–MpA–UDC	XV (2008)
27	Rosario Crocetta (1951– )	10 November 2012	18 November 2017	5 years, 7 days	PD	PD–UDC–IM–SF–CpS	XVI (2012)
28	Nello Musumeci (1955– )	18 November 2017	13 October 2022	4 years, 329 days	DB	FI–MpA–UDC–DB–FdI	XVI (2017)
29	Renato Schifani (1950– )	13 October 2022	Incumbent	3 years, 353 days	FI	FdI–FI–Lega–MpA–DC	XVII (2022)

== Legislative branch ==
The Sicilian Regional Assembly is composed of 90 members (or deputies). 80 deputies are elected in provincial constituencies by proportional representation using the largest remainder method with a Droop quota and open lists, while 10 councillors (elected in a general ticket) come from a "regional list", including the President-elect. One seat is reserved for the candidate who comes second.

The Assembly is elected for a five-year term, but, if the President suffers a vote of no confidence, resigns or dies, under the simul stabunt, simul cadent clause introduced in 2001 (literally they will stand together or they will fall together), also the Assembly is dissolved and a snap election is called.

=== Current composition ===
The Sicilian Regional Assembly is currently composed of the following political groups:

Party	Seats	Status
Forza Italia (FI)	13 / 70	In government
Brothers of Italy (FdI)	11 / 70	In government
Democratic Party (PD)	11 / 70	In opposition
Five Star Movement (M5S)	9 / 70	In opposition
Christian Democracy (DC)	6 / 70	In government
Populars and Autonomists (P&A)	6 / 70	In government
Italy First – League (Lega)	5 / 70	In government
ControCorrente (CC)	4 / 70	In opposition
South calls North (ScN)	3 / 70	In opposition
Mixed Group	2 / 70	In government

== Local government ==
=== Provinces ===
Sicily was divided in nine provinces, which were a traditional form of local administration in the region. Socialist and Christian-democratic ideas had an early diffusion in quite all the provinces around World War I. After the Fascist parenthesis, left-wing parties found their strongholds in central agricultural provinces, especially in the Province of Enna, but they didn't succeed in local elections, while Christian Democracy obtained high scores in others parts of the Region.

On 19 March 2013 the Sicilian Regional Assembly decided to turn them into Free Municipal Consortiums (Liberi consorzi comunali). Finally, on 30 July 2015 the Regional Assembly approved a law which put into force the municipal consortiums, regulating their functions and abolishing definitively the nine historical provinces. The same law created the new Metropolitan Cities of Palermo, Messina and Catania.

Province	Inhabitants	President	Election	Current status
Palermo (list)	1,250,296	Roberto Lagalla	2022	Metropolitan City
Catania (list)	1,167,006	Enrico Trantino	2023	Metropolitan City
Messina (list)	651,921	Federico Basile	2022	Metropolitan City
Agrigento (list)	453,416	Giuseppe Pendolino	2025	Free Municipal Consortium
Trapani (list)	436,459	Salvatore Quinci	2025	Free Municipal Consortium
Syracuse (list)	404,271	Michelangelo Giansiracusa	2025	Free Municipal Consortium
Ragusa (list)	320,003	Maria Rita Schembari	2025	Free Municipal Consortium
Caltanissetta (list)	270,102	Walter Tesauro	2025	Free Municipal Consortium
Enna (list)	171,921	Piero Capizzi	2025	Free Municipal Consortium

=== Municipalities ===
Sicily is also divided in 390 comuni (municipalities), which have even more history, having been established in the Middle Ages when they were the main places of government.

Provincial capitals

Municipality	Inhabitants	Mayor	Party	Election
Agrigento	58,323	Francesco Miccichè	Independent (Centre-right coalition)	2020
Caltanissetta	61,711	Roberto Gambino	Five Star Movement	2019
Catania	293,902	Salvo Pogliese	Brothers of Italy	2018
Enna	27,894	Maurizio Dipietro	Italia Viva	2020
Messina	243,262	Cateno De Luca	Independent (centre)	2018
Palermo	657,651	Roberto Lagalla	Union of the Centre	2022
Ragusa	73,543	Giuseppe Cassì	Independent (right-wing)	2018
Syracuse	118,385	Francesco Italia	Action	2018
Trapani	69,241	Giacomo Tranchida	Democratic Party	2018

Other municipalities

Cities with 50,000+ inhabitants.

Municipality	Inhabitants	Mayor	Party	Election
Marsala	80,218	Massimo Grillo	Union of the Centre	2020
Gela	75,668	Lucio Greco	Independent (centre-left)	2019
Vittoria	63,002	Giovanni Moscato	Independent (centre-right)	2016
Modica	54,324	Ignazio Abbate	Union of the Centre	2018
Bagheria	54,257	Patrizio Cinque	Five Star Movement	2014
Acireale	51,456	Stefano Alì	Five Star Movement	2018

== Parties and elections ==
=== Latest regional election ===
Candidates	Votes	%	Seats	Parties	Votes	%	Seats
Renato Schifani	887,215	42.05	7				
Renato Schifani	887,215	42.05	7	Brothers of Italy	282,345	15.10	11
Renato Schifani	887,215	42.05	7	Forza Italia	275,736	14.75	11
Renato Schifani	887,215	42.05	7	Italy First – League	127,454	6.80	4
Renato Schifani	887,215	42.05	7	Populars and Autonomists	127,096	6.80	3
Renato Schifani	887,215	42.05	7	Christian Democracy	121,691	6.51	4
Renato Schifani	887,215	42.05	7	Total	934,322	49.96	33
Cateno De Luca	505,386	23.95	1				
Cateno De Luca	505,386	23.95	1	South calls North	254,453	13.61	7
Cateno De Luca	505,386	23.95	1	Sicilia Vera	50,877	2.72	–
Cateno De Luca	505,386	23.95	1	Sicilian Pride	18,165	0.97	–
Cateno De Luca	505,386	23.95	1	Land of Love	3,390	0.18	–
Cateno De Luca	505,386	23.95	1	Young Sicilians	3,042	0.16	–
Cateno De Luca	505,386	23.95	1	Sicilian Autonomy	3,042	0.16	–
Cateno De Luca	505,386	23.95	1	Sicily Feat	2,702	0.14	–
Cateno De Luca	505,386	23.95	1	Work in Sicily	1,793	0.10	–
Cateno De Luca	505,386	23.95	1	Enough Mafias	1,356	0.07	–
Cateno De Luca	505,386	23.95	1	Total	336,390	18.11	7
Caterina Chinnici	341,252	16.17	–				
Caterina Chinnici	341,252	16.17	–	Democratic Party	238,761	12.77	11
Caterina Chinnici	341,252	16.17	–	One Hundred Steps for Sicily	55,599	2.97	–
Caterina Chinnici	341,252	16.17	–	Total	294,360	15.74	11
Nuccio di Paola	321,142	15.22	–	Five Star Movement	254,974	13.64	11
Gaetano Armao	43,835	2.08	–	Action – Italia Viva	39,788	2.13	–
Eliana Esposito	10,973	0.52	–	Free Sicilians	7,654	0.41	–
Blank and invalid votes	140,596	6.25					
Total candidates	2,250,399	100.00	8	Total parties	1,869,863	100.00	62
Registered voters/turnout	4,609,984	48.82					
Source: Regione Sicilia
