= Elections in Sicily =

This page gathers the results of elections in Sicily.

== Regional elections ==
=== Latest regional election ===
Candidates	Votes	%	Seats	Parties	Votes	%	Seats
Renato Schifani	887,215	42.05	7				
Renato Schifani	887,215	42.05	7	Brothers of Italy	282,345	15.10	11
Renato Schifani	887,215	42.05	7	Forza Italia	275,736	14.75	11
Renato Schifani	887,215	42.05	7	Italy First – League	127,454	6.80	4
Renato Schifani	887,215	42.05	7	Populars and Autonomists	127,096	6.80	3
Renato Schifani	887,215	42.05	7	Christian Democracy	121,691	6.51	4
Renato Schifani	887,215	42.05	7	Total	934,322	49.96	33
Cateno De Luca	505,386	23.95	1				
Cateno De Luca	505,386	23.95	1	South calls North	254,453	13.61	7
Cateno De Luca	505,386	23.95	1	Sicilia Vera	50,877	2.72	–
Cateno De Luca	505,386	23.95	1	Sicilian Pride	18,165	0.97	–
Cateno De Luca	505,386	23.95	1	Land of Love	3,390	0.18	–
Cateno De Luca	505,386	23.95	1	Young Sicilians	3,042	0.16	–
Cateno De Luca	505,386	23.95	1	Sicilian Autonomy	3,042	0.16	–
Cateno De Luca	505,386	23.95	1	Sicily Feat	2,702	0.14	–
Cateno De Luca	505,386	23.95	1	Work in Sicily	1,793	0.10	–
Cateno De Luca	505,386	23.95	1	Enough Mafias	1,356	0.07	–
Cateno De Luca	505,386	23.95	1	Total	336,390	18.11	7
Caterina Chinnici	341,252	16.17	–				
Caterina Chinnici	341,252	16.17	–	Democratic Party	238,761	12.77	11
Caterina Chinnici	341,252	16.17	–	One Hundred Steps for Sicily	55,599	2.97	–
Caterina Chinnici	341,252	16.17	–	Total	294,360	15.74	11
Nuccio di Paola	321,142	15.22	–	Five Star Movement	254,974	13.64	11
Gaetano Armao	43,835	2.08	–	Action – Italia Viva	39,788	2.13	–
Eliana Esposito	10,973	0.52	–	Free Sicilians	7,654	0.41	–
Blank and invalid votes	140,596	6.25					
Total candidates	2,250,399	100.00	8	Total parties	1,869,863	100.00	62
Registered voters/turnout	4,609,984	48.82					
Source: Regione Sicilia

=== List of previous regional elections ===
- 1947 Sicilian regional election
- 1951 Sicilian regional election
- 1955 Sicilian regional election
- 1959 Sicilian regional election
- 1963 Sicilian regional election
- 1967 Sicilian regional election
- 1971 Sicilian regional election
- 1976 Sicilian regional election
- 1981 Sicilian regional election
- 1986 Sicilian regional election
- 1991 Sicilian regional election
- 1996 Sicilian regional election
- 2001 Sicilian regional election
- 2006 Sicilian regional election
- 2008 Sicilian regional election
- 2012 Sicilian regional election
- 2017 Sicilian regional election

== Italian general elections ==
- 1946 Italian general election in Sicily
- 1948 Italian general election in Sicily
- 1953 Italian general election in Sicily
- 1958 Italian general election in Sicily
- 1963 Italian general election in Sicily
- 1968 Italian general election in Sicily
- 1972 Italian general election in Sicily
- 1976 Italian general election in Sicily
- 1979 Italian general election in Sicily
- 1983 Italian general election in Sicily
- 1987 Italian general election in Sicily
- 1992 Italian general election in Sicily
- 1994 Italian general election in Sicily
- 1996 Italian general election in Sicily
- 2001 Italian general election in Sicily
- 2006 Italian general election in Sicily
- 2008 Italian general election in Sicily
- 2013 Italian general election in Sicily
- 2018 Italian general election in Sicily
- 2022 Italian general election in Sicily

== European Parliament elections ==
- 1979 European Parliament election in Sicily
- 1984 European Parliament election in Sicily
- 1989 European Parliament election in Sicily
- 1994 European Parliament election in Sicily
- 1999 European Parliament election in Sicily
- 2004 European Parliament election in Sicily
- 2009 European Parliament election in Sicily
- 2014 European Parliament election in Sicily
- 2019 European Parliament election in Sicily
- 2024 European Parliament election in Sicily
