= List of presidents of Sicily =

This is the list of all the presidents of Sicily since 1947.

There has been 24 elected presidents by Regional Council (1947–2001), and 4 directly elected presidents since 2001.

== List ==
Elected by the Regional Council (1947–2001)

№	Name	Term of office		Political party	Legislature
1	Giuseppe Alessi	30 May 1947	13 June 1949	DC	I (1947)
2	Franco Restivo	13 June 1949	20 July 1951	DC	I (1947)
2	Franco Restivo	20 July 1951	4 June 1955	DC	II (1951)
(1)	Giuseppe Alessi	4 June 1955	4 April 1956	DC	III (1955)
3	Giuseppe La Loggia	4 April 1956	13 May 1958	DC	III (1955)
4	Silvio Milazzo	13 May 1958	12 August 1959	DC / USCS	III (1955)
4	Silvio Milazzo	12 August 1959	23 February 1960	DC / USCS	IV (1959)
5	Benedetto della Nicchiara	23 February 1960	8 September 1961	DC	IV (1959)
6	Giuseppe D'Angelo	8 September 1961	25 July 1963	DC	IV (1959)
6	Giuseppe D'Angelo	25 July 1963	4 August 1964	DC	V (1963)
7	Francesco Coniglio	4 August 1964	11 August 1967	DC	V (1963)
8	Vincenzo Carollo	11 August 1967	20 September 1969	DC	VI (1967)
9	Mario Fasino	20 September 1969	10 August 1971	DC	VI (1967)
9	Mario Fasino	10 August 1971	22 December 1972	DC	VII (1971)
10	Vincenzo Giummarra	22 December 1972	26 March 1974	DC	VII (1971)
11	Angelo Bonfiglio	26 March 1974	13 August 1976	DC	VII (1971)
11	Angelo Bonfiglio	13 August 1976	20 March 1978	DC	VIII (1976)
12	Piersanti Mattarella	20 March 1978	6 January 1980	DC	VIII (1976)
13	Mario D'Acquisto	6 January 1980	7 August 1981	DC	VIII (1976)
13	Mario D'Acquisto	7 August 1981	23 December 1982	DC	IX (1981)
14	Calogero Lo Giudice	23 December 1982	19 October 1983	DC	IX (1981)
15	Santi Nicita	19 October 1983	21 March 1984	DC	IX (1981)
16	Modesto Sardo	21 March 1984	1 February 1985	DC	IX (1981)
17	Rino Nicolosi	1 February 1985	12 August 1986	DC	IX (1981)
17	Rino Nicolosi	12 August 1986	12 August 1991	DC	X (1986)
18	Vincenzo Leanza	12 August 1991	16 July 1992	DC	XI (1991)
19	Giuseppe Campione	16 July 1992	21 December 1993	DC	XI (1991)
20	Francesco Martino	21 December 1993	16 May 1995	PLI	XI (1991)
21	Matteo Graziano	16 May 1995	18 July 1996	PPI	XI (1991)
22	Giuseppe Provenzano	18 July 1996	20 January 1998	FI	XII (1996)
23	Giuseppe Drago	20 January 1998	21 November 1998	CCD	XII (1996)
24	Angelo Capodicasa	21 November 1998	26 July 2000	DS	XII (1996)
(18)	Vincenzo Leanza	26 July 2000	17 July 2001	FI	XII (1996)

Directly-elected presidents (since 2001)

N.	President	Term of office		Tenure (Years and days)	Party	Coalition	Legislature
25	Salvatore Cuffaro (1958– )	17 July 2001	15 June 2006	6 years, 193 days	CCD / UDC	FI–AN–CDC–CDU–NPSI	XIII (2001)
25	Salvatore Cuffaro (1958– )	15 June 2006	26 January 2008 (Note: Resigned after being sentenced five years in prison for aiding and abetting the Mafia. His deputy Nicola Leanza (UDC) held the office till a new regional election was called.)	6 years, 193 days	CCD / UDC	FI–UDC–MpA–AN	XIV (2006)
26	Raffaele Lombardo (1950– )	28 April 2008	10 November 2012 (Note: Resigned on 31 July 2012 after being under investigation for external contribution with Mafia and pork-barrelling. Remained in office as Acting President till a new regional election was called.)	4 years, 196 days	MpA	PdL–MpA–UDC	XV (2008)
27	Rosario Crocetta (1951– )	10 November 2012	18 November 2017	5 years, 7 days	PD	PD–UDC–IM–SF–CpS	XVI (2012)
28	Nello Musumeci (1955– )	18 November 2017	13 October 2022	4 years, 329 days	DB	FI–MpA–UDC–DB–FdI	XVI (2017)
29	Renato Schifani (1950– )	13 October 2022	Incumbent	3 years, 225 days	FI	FdI–FI–Lega–MpA–DC	XVII (2022)
