= Sicilian Regional Assembly =

Legislative organ of Sicily, Italy

Coordinates: 38°06′40″N 13°21′10″E

Sicilian Regional Assembly Assemblea regionale siciliana
- 18th Legislature

Type
- Type: Regional council Unicameral

History
- Founded: 25 May 1947

Leadership
- President: Gaetano Galvagno, FdI since 11 November 2022

Structure
- Seats: 70
- Political groups: Government (42): FI (13); FdI (11); P&A (6); Lega (6); DC (4); Mixed Group (2); Opposition (28): PD (11); M5S (9); CC (4); ScN (4)

Elections
- Last election: 25 September 2022
- Next election: No later than 26 September 2027

Meeting place
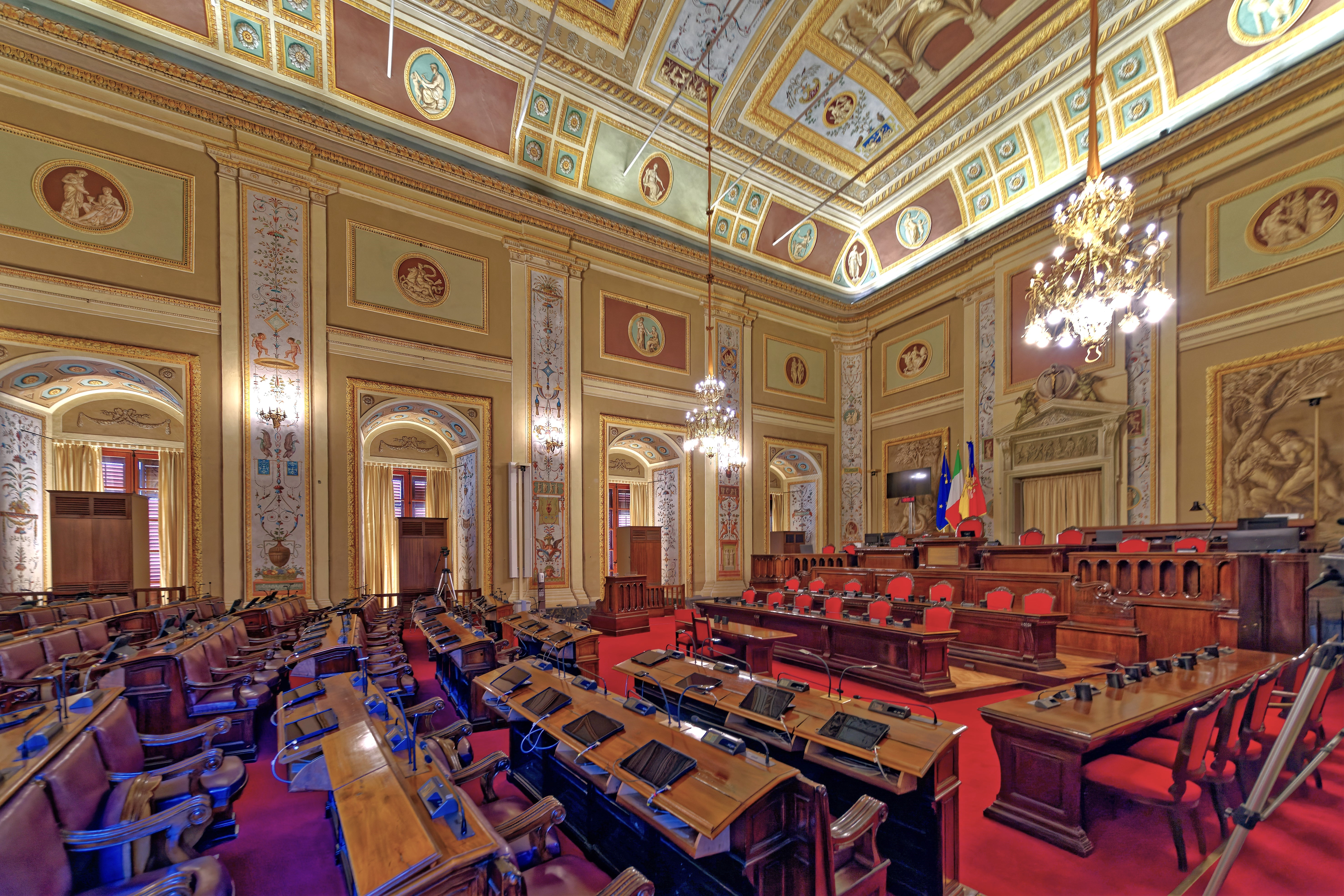
- Sala d'Ercole, Palazzo dei Normanni, Palermo

Website
- www.ars.sicilia.it

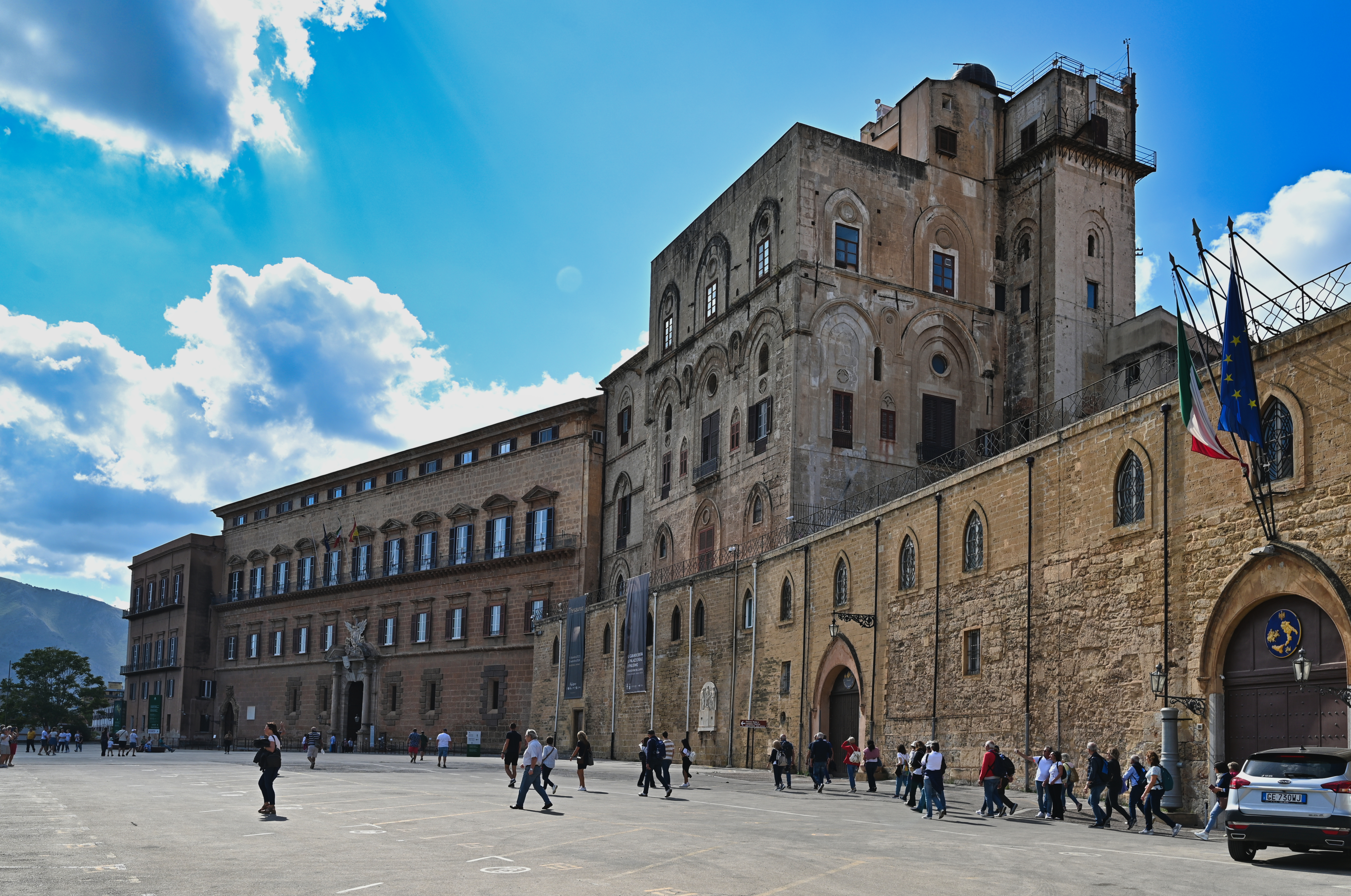
Palazzo dei Normanni

The Sicilian Regional Assembly (Italian: Assemblea regionale siciliana; Sicilian: Assimbrea riggiunali siciliana) is the legislative body of Sicily. While it has a long history as an autonomous entity, the modern Region of Sicily was established by Royal Decree on 15 May 1946, before the Italian Republic. The Regional Assembly has the widest legislative power in Italy and is the only regional assembly to have the title of "parliament" whose members are called "deputies" as are those in Rome. Seventy deputies are elected every five years in the nine provinces.

== History ==
The Sicilian Parliament is one of the oldest parliaments in the world and arguably the first legislature in the modern sense.

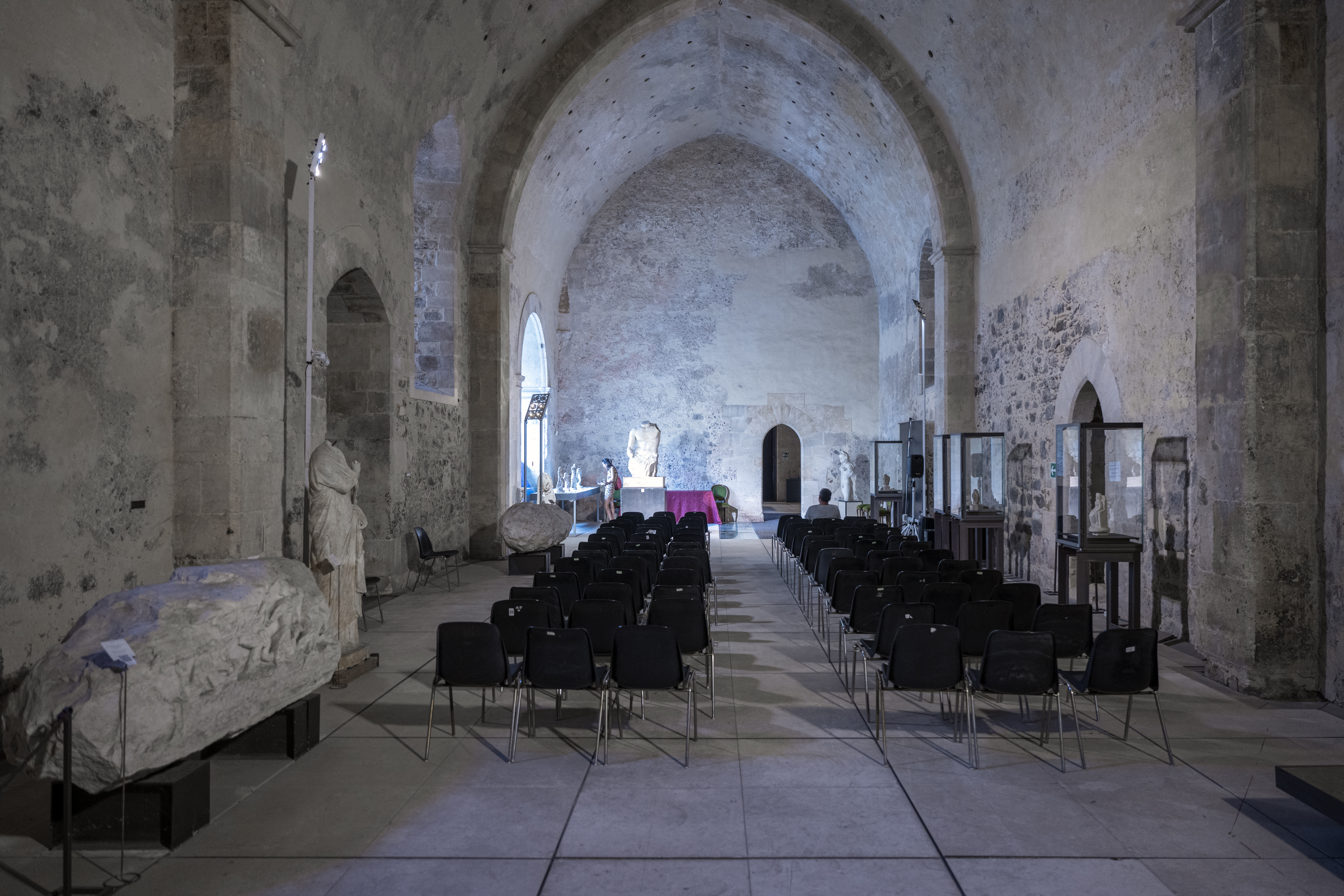
Sala dei Parlamenti (Parliament Hall) in Castello Ursino, Catania. It was the seat of the Sicilian Parliament during most of the 15th century.

=== Post-war ===
The election of a democratic parliament came at the end of World War II. To defuse the separatist movement in Sicily, the Sicilian Regional Council was established in February 1945 and the special statute was issued on 15 May 1946.

After the regional elections of 20 April 1947, this body was reborn as the Sicilian Regional Assembly on 25 May 1947. In 1997 the Assembly celebrated its 900th anniversary, and in 2001 the President was elected directly by the citizens. On 26 January 2008, for the first time in republican history, the Assembly was dissolved by the resignation of Regional President Salvatore Cuffaro.

== Seat ==
The Assembly has its seat in the prestigious Palazzo dei Normanni (Norman Palace) in Palermo. It was constructed in the 11th century following the Norman conquest of Sicily and has seen several expansion and renovation operations. It hosted the kings of Sicily, including Frederick II of Swabia, and later the viceroy of Spain. Adjacent is the Palatine Chapel. The tourist services in the Palace and the Palatine Chapel are entrusted to the Foundation Frederick II.

== Composition ==
The Assembly is composed of seventy deputies elected by direct universal suffrage every five years by voters in Sicily. Until 2017, the members were 90. From 25 May 1947 to now there were XVII legislatures, initially for a period of four years, while in 1971 five years. For the first time the XIV^ legislature ended prematurely in 2008 due to the resignation of the President of the region, Salvatore Cuffaro. The actual electoral mechanism, which includes a barrier of 5% of the list, provides for the provincial colleges of 62 members plus the president-elect and a candidate for president with the most votes among the non-elect. The remaining six seats are allocated to the majority share to reach 42 members.

=== Electoral system ===
From 1947 until 1996, the Sicilian Regional Assembly had 90 regional deputies elected with the proportional system on the basis of the nine provincial constituencies, while the president of the region and the assessors were elected by the deputies. In the 2001 election, the Sicilian regional presidency became a directly elected office, and the Tatarella Law was applied temporarily to elect 72 deputies from the provincial constituencies, while 18 came from the list of the elected president and one for the second classified among the president candidates, with the threshold at 4 percent.

A new electoral law was adopted in 2005. This law created a mixed electoral system with the following parameters:

- 80 out of 90 deputies are chosen through a proportional system in the provincial constituencies, with an electoral barrier of 5% on a regional basis for each party;
- proportional seats are distributed only at the provincial level;
- the distribution at the provincial level (proportional to the population and therefore variable each term) was: 7 seats for the province of Agrigento, 4 for Caltanissetta, 17 for Catania, 3 for Enna, 11 for Messina, 20 for Palermo, 5 for Ragusa, 6 for Syracuse, 7 for Trapani;
- up to 9 deputies (including the President) are elected with the regional list of the presidential candidate to reach the threshold of 54 majority seats;
- 1 seat is reserved for the second-place finisher in the presidential election.

With the modification of the law in 2013, the number of deputies dropped to 70 beginning with the regional election of 2017. The selection process in this current system has the following parameters:

- 62 out of 70 deputies are chosen through a proportional system in provincial constituencies, with an electoral barrier of 5% on a regional basis for each party;
- proportional seats are distributed only at the provincial level;
- the distribution at the provincial level (proportional to the population and therefore variable every term) is: 6 seats for the province of Agrigento, 3 for Caltanissetta, 13 for Catania, 2 for Enna, 8 for Messina, 16 for Palermo, 4 for Ragusa, 5 for Syracuse, 5 for Trapani;
- 7 deputies (including the President) are elected with the regional list of the presidential candidate.
- 1 seat is reserved for the second-place finisher in the presidential election.

=== Political groups ===
The Sicilian Regional Assembly is currently composed of the following political groups:

Party	Seats	Status
Forza Italia (FI)	13 / 70	In government
Brothers of Italy (FdI)	11 / 70	In government
Democratic Party (PD)	11 / 70	In opposition
Five Star Movement (M5S)	9 / 70	In opposition
Populars and Autonomists (P&A)	6 / 70	In government
Italy First – League (Lega)	6 / 70	In government
Christian Democracy (DC)	4 / 70	In government
ControCorrente (CC)	4 / 70	In opposition
South calls North (ScN)	4 / 70	In opposition
Mixed Group	2 / 70	In government

=== Historical composition ===
Election	DC	PCI	PSI	PLI	PRI	PSDI	MSI	PNM/PDIUM	MiS	Others	Total
20 April 1947	20	29		13 (Note: As Liberal Democratic Bloc (BLD).)	3	4		10	9	2	90
3 June 1951	31	31		4	0	3	12	6	2	1	90
5 June 1955	39	20	10	3	2		8	8		0	90
7 June 1959	33	21	12	2	0	2	8	0		12	90
9 June 1963	37	22	11	6	2	3	7	2		0	90
11 June 1967	35	21	12	4	4	0	8	2		0	90
13 June 1971	29	14	11	3	3	5	15	0		10	90
20 June 1976	39	24	10	2	4	2	9			0	90
21 June 1981	38	20	14	4	5	3	6			0	90
22 June 1986	36	19	14	3	5	4	8			1	90
16 June 1991	39	13 (Note: As Democratic Party of the Left (PDS).)	15	2	3	6	5			6	90

Election	CCD-CDU	FI	PDS	AN	PPI	PRC	LR	RI	PS	Others	Total
16 June 1996	18	17	12	14	6	6	3	3	3	7	90

Election	Government	Opposition	Council	President of the Region
24 June 2001	Centre-right (House of Freedoms) 57 / 90	Centre-left (The Olive Tree) 29 / 90 DE 4 / 90		Salvatore Cuffaro (2001–2008)
28 May 2006	Centre-right (House of Freedoms) 62 / 90	Centre-left (The Union) 28 / 90		Salvatore Cuffaro (2001–2008)
13 April 2008 (snap election)	Centre-right 61 / 90	Centre-left 29 / 90		Raffaele Lombardo (2008–2012)
28 October 2012 (snap election)	Centre-left 39 / 90	Centre-right 21 / 90 M5S 15 / 90 GS–PdS–FLI 15 / 90		Rosario Crocetta (2012–2017)
5 November 2017	Centre-right 36 / 70	M5S 20 / 70 Centre-left 13 / 70 SI 1 / 70		Nello Musumeci (2017–2022)
25 September 2022	Centre-right 40 / 70	Centre-left 11 / 70 M5S 11 / 70 ScN 8 / 70		Renato Schifani (since 2022)

== Elections ==
20 April 1947	Legislative
3 June 1951	Legislative
5 June 1955	Legislative
7 June 1959	Legislative
9 June 1963	Legislative
11 June 1967	Legislative
13 June 1971	Legislative
20 June 1976	Legislative
21 June 1981	Legislative
22 June 1986	Legislative
16 June 1991	Legislative
16 June 1996	Legislative
24 June 2001	Presidential & Legislative
28 May 2006	Presidential & Legislative
13 April 2008	Presidential & Legislative
28 October 2012	Presidential & Legislative
5 November 2017	Presidential & Legislative
25 September 2022	Presidential & Legislative

== Presidents (1947–present) ==
No.	Name	Legislature	Term of office		Party
1	Ettore Cipolla	I	1947	1951	UQ
2	Giulio Bonfiglio	II	1951	1955	DC
3	Giuseppe La Loggia	III	1955	1956	DC
4	Giuseppe Alessi	III	1956	1959	DC
5	Ferdinando Stagno D'Alcontres	IV	1959	1963	DC
6	Rosario Lanza	V	1963	1967	DC
6	Rosario Lanza	VI	1967	1971	DC
7	Angelo Bonfiglio	VII	1971	1974	DC
8	Mario Fasino	VII	1974	1976	DC
9	Pancrazio De Pasquale	VIII	1976	1979	PCI
10	Michelangelo Russo	VIII	1979	1981	PCI
11	Salvatore Lauricella	IX	1981	1986	PSI
11	Salvatore Lauricella	X	1986	1991	PSI
12	Paolo Piccione	XI	1991	1993	PSI
13	Angelo Capitummino	XI	1993	1996	DC
14	Nicola Cristaldi	XII	1996	2001	AN
15	Guido Lo Porto	XIII	2001	2006	AN
16	Gianfranco Micciché	XIV	2006	2008	FI
17	Francesco Cascio	XV	2008	2012	PdL
18	Giovanni Ardizzone	XVI	2012	2017	UDC
(16)	Gianfranco Micciché	XVII	2017	2022	FI
19	Gaetano Galvagno	XVIII	2022		FdI
Source: Assemblea Regionale Siciliana – I Presidenti dell'Assemblea

== See also ==
- Regional council (Italy)
- Sicilian Parliament
- List of presidents of Sicily
