= Giuseppe Drago =

Italian politician

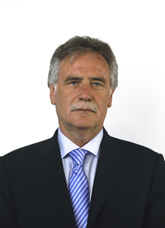

President of Sicily
- In office 20 January 1998 – 21 November 1998
- Preceded by: Giuseppe Provenzano
- Succeeded by: Angelo Capodicasa

Member of the Chamber of Deputies
- In office 30 May 2001 – 17 November 2010
- Constituency: Sicilia 2

Personal details
- Born: 29 September 1955 Scicli, Sicily, Italy
- Died: 21 September 2016 (aged 60) Modica, Sicily, Italy
- Party: PSI (until 1994); CCD (1995–2002); UDC (2002–2010); PID (since 2010)
- Education: University of Palermo
- Occupation: Politician, physician

Giuseppe Drago (29 September 1955 – 21 September 2016) was an Italian physician and politician. He was President of Sicily from January to November 1998.

== Biography ==
Giuseppe Drago graduated at the University of Palermo in 1981 and obtained the specialization diploma in Orthopedics and Traumatology.

He was mayor of Modica and provincial councilor of Ragusa. In 1991 he was elected to the Sicilian Regional Assembly on the Italian Socialist Party (PSI) list. In 1993 he became regional Assessor for labor in the Martino government and in 1995 was re-confirmed in the Graziano government.

In 1995 Drago joined the Christian Democratic Centre and in 1996 was re-elected to the Sicilian Regional Assembly. He served as President of Sicily from 20 January 1998 to 21 November 1998, at the head of a centre-right government. In 1999 he became national vice-secretary of the CCD and in 2000 he was appointed assessor to the Presidency in the Sicilian regional government led by Vincenzo Leanza.

He was elected for the first time to the Chamber of Deputies 2001. On 30 December 2004 he was appointed Undersecretary of Defence in the Berlusconi II government, while in April 2005 he became Undersecretary of foreign affairs in the Berlusconi III government. He was re-elected to the Chamber in the 2006 and 2008 general election, among the ranks of the UDC.

In September 2010, together with the deputies Francesco Saverio Romano, Calogero Mannino, Giuseppe Ruvolo and Michele Pisacane, he abandoned the UDC and founded with them The Populars of Italy Tomorrow (PID). The 5 deputies therefore abandoned the opposition role, for which they were elected to the UDC, and take sides in support of the centre-right parliamentary majority of Silvio Berlusconi.

In May 2009 he was disqualified from holding public office due to misappropriating funds. As a result, he lost his seat in the Chamber of Deputies.

He died after a long illness on 21 September 2016, in the hospice of Modica.

== See also ==
- Politics of Italy
