= La Loggia (disambiguation) =

La Loggia is a comune in the Metropolitan City of Turin in the Italian region Piedmont.

La Loggia may also refer to:

- Enrico La Loggia, an Italian politician
- Frank LaLoggia, an American film director, screenwriter, producer, and actor
- Giuseppe La Loggia, an Italian politician.

== See also ==
- Loggia (disambiguation)
