= D'Acquisto =

D'Acquisto is a surname. Notable people with the surname include:

- John D'Acquisto (born 1951), American former Major League Baseball pitcher
- Mario D'Acquisto, president of Sicily from 1980 to 1982 - see List of presidents of Sicily
- Salvo D'Acquisto (1920–1943), member of the Italian Carabinieri who sacrificed himself to save 22 civilians from execution
- Bronte D'Acquisto, Big Brother contestant
