= Mario Fasino =

Italian politician (1920–2017)

President of Sicily
- In office 20 September 1969 – 22 December 1972
- Preceded by: Vincenzo Carollo
- Succeeded by: Vincenzo Giummara

President of the Sicilian Regional Assembly
- In office 10 April 1974 – 20 June 1976
- Preceded by: Angelo Bonfiglio
- Succeeded by: Pancrazio De Pasquale

Personal details
- Born: 26 July 1920 San Severo, Province of Foggia, Apulia, Italy
- Died: 17 January 2017 (aged 96) Palermo, Sicily
- Party: DC

Mario Fasino (26 July 1920 – 17 January 2017) was an Italian politician, journalist, and one of the co-founders of Christian Democratic Party (DC) in Sicily. He served as the President of the region of Sicily from 20 September 1969 until 22 December 1972. Fasino was elected President of the Sicilian Regional Assembly from 1974 to 1976. In addition to his political career, Fasino, a journalist, was the director of "Voce cattolica", the official publication of the Roman Catholic Archdiocese of Palermo.

== Biography ==
Fasino was born in 1920 in San Severo, Province of Foggia, Apulia. He was first elected to the Sicilian Regional Assembly in 1951, representing a constituency in Palermo. Fasino would win re-election to the Sicilian Regional Assembly for an additional seven terms during his career.

In 1969, Fasino was elected President of Sicily, the head of the regional government. He led five separate Sicilian governments from 1969 until he left the office of the presidency on 22 December 1972.

Two years later, Fasino was elected President of the Sicilian Regional Assembly, succeeding the outgoing speaker, Angelo Bonfiglio, who had been elected to the national Chamber of Deputies. Fasino headed the Sicilian Regional Assembly as President from 1974 until 1976.

In 1981, Fasino lost re-election to the Sicilian Regional Assembly. However, he returned to the Assembly in 1983 when he was appointed to fill the vacant seat of Mario D'Acquisto, who had been elected to the Chamber of Deputies. Fasino declined to seek re-election to Assembly in 1986, but remained a high-ranking official within the Sicilian regional DC Party. He was also appointed to the Christian Democratic Party (DC) national council.

Fasino later became the President of the Centro di studi filologici e linguistici siciliani (CSFLS) (Center of Philology Studies and Sicilian Language). During the 1990s, Fasino was also appointed to the Sicilian Council of Regional Culture.

Mario Fasino died in Palermo, Sicily, on 17 January 2017, at the age of 96. His funeral was held at the Santa Maria di Monserrato Church in Palermo.
