= President of the Regional Council =

President of the Regional Council may refer to:

- President of the Regional Council (France)
  - List of presidents of the Regional Council of Franche-Comté
- President of the Regional Council (Italy)
  - President of the Regional Council of Veneto
  - President of Tuscany
- President of the Regional Council of French Guiana
- President of the Regional Council of Guadeloupe
- President of the Regional Council of Martinique

== See also ==
- Regions of France
- Regions of Italy
