= Salvatore Corallo =

Italian politician (1928–2019)

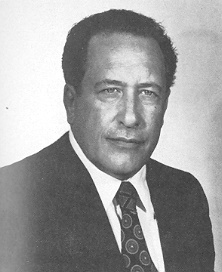
Salvatore Corallo

Salvatore Corallo (11 October 1928 – 4 May 2019) was an Italian politician of the Communist Party (PCI). Born in Syracuse, Sicily, he was elected to the Sicilian Regional Assembly in 1959. Corallo was appointed President of Sicily in June 1961, serving in this role for a period of less than three months. He later served as a member of the Chamber of Deputies in Legislature VII (1976–1979), and as a Senator in Legislature VIII (1979–1983).

Corallo died on 4 May 2019 in Syracuse, at the age of 90.
