= Loggia (disambiguation) =

Loggia is an architectural feature.

Loggia may also refer to:

- Loggia (surname), Italian surname
- Loggia P2, a Masonic lodge under the Grand Orient of Italy
- Robert Loggia (1930–2015), American actor

== See also ==
- Logia
- La Loggia (disambiguation)
