= Vincenzo Carollo =

Italian politician (1920–2013)

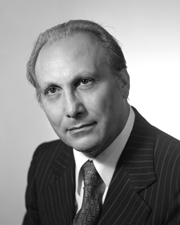
- Vincenzo Carollo

Senator of the Italian Republic
- In office 25 May 1972 – 1 July 1987
- Constituency: Sicily

President of Sicily
- In office 20 September 1967 – 26 February 1969
- Preceded by: Vincenzo Giummarra
- Succeeded by: Mario Fasino

Personal details
- Born: 8 December 1920 Castelbuono, Province of Palermo, Sicily, Italy
- Died: 7 February 2013 (aged 92) Palermo, Sicily
- Party: Christian Democrat
- Profession: University Assistant

Vincenzo Carollo (8 December 1920 – 7 February 2013) was an Italian politician from Palermo and member of the Christian Democratic Party (DC).

== Biography ==
Carollo was born on 8 December 1920 in Castelbuono, Palermo. He would go on to get a degree in literature and later become a university assistant for University of Palermo's Ethnology department.

He served as the President of Sicily, the head of the regional government, from 1967 to 1969. He would also serve as a member of the Sicilian Regional Assembly between 1958 and 1979.

Carollo was also a member of the national Senate of the Republic from 1972 until 1986. He simultaneously served as the mayor of Castelbuono from 1969 to 1983.

Vincenzo Carollo died in Palermo on 7 February 2013, at the age of 93.

== Views and associations ==
In March 1981, Carollo's name was discovered on a secret list of Propaganda Due members in Licio Gelli's possession.

As a Senator, Carollo was a critic of easing relations with the Soviet Union, claiming that the USSR was unfaithful to the SALT treaties.
