= President of the Regional Council (Italy) =

The president of the Regional Council (Italian: Presidente del consiglio regionale) is the speaker who heads the consiglio regionale of a regione, a state-level territory.

Regione	2005-2010	2025-2029
Aosta Valley	Luciano Caveri	Stefano Aggravi
Piedmont	Davide Gariglio	Davide Nicco
Lombardy	Giulio De Capitani	Federico Romani
Trentino-Alto Adige/Südtirol	Marco Depaoli	Roberto Paccher
Veneto	Marino Finozzi	Luca Zaia
Friuli-Venezia Giulia	Edouard Ballaman	Mauro Bordin
Ligury	Giacomo Ronzitti	Stefano Balleari
Emilia-Romagna	Monica Donini	Michele De Pascale
Tuscany	Riccardo Nencini	Stefania Saccardi
Umbria	Mauro Tippolotti	Sarah Bistocchi
The Marches	Luigi Minardi	Gianluca Pasqui
Latium	Guido Milana	Antonio Aurigemma
Abruzzo	Nazario Pagano	Lorenzo Sospiri
Molise	Mario Pietracupa	Quintino Pallante
Campania	Sandra Lonardo	Massimiliano Manfredi
Apulia	Pietro Pepe	Toni Matarrelli
Basilicata	Maria Antezza	Marcello Pittella
Calabria	Giuseppe Bova	Salvatore Cirillo
Sicily	Francesco Cascio (Note: President of the Sicilian Regional Assembly)	Gaetano Galvagno
Sardinia	Claudia Lombardo	Piero Comandini

== See also ==
- Politics of Italy

== Sources ==
- http://www.parlamentiregionali.it
