= Benedetto Majorana della Nicchiara =

Italian politician (1899–1982)

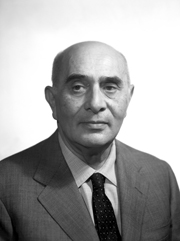

President of Sicily
- In office 23 February 1960 – 29 June 1961
- Preceded by: Silvio Milazzo
- Succeeded by: Salvatore Corallo

Member of the Senate
- In office 25 May 1972 – 4 July 1976

Personal details
- Born: 18 August 1899 Catania, Sicily, Italy
- Died: 22 November 1982 (aged 83) Catania, Sicily, Italy
- Party: UQ; PMP; USCS; DC; MSI

Benedetto Majorana della Nicchiara (18 August 1899 – 22 November 1982) was an Italian politician.

== Biography ==
Son of Don Giuseppe Majorana, baron of Nicchiara and Donna Fernanda Paternò Castello of the Dukes of Carcaci, he was baptized as Benedetto Francesco di Paola Michele Maria Agatino; he was an exponent of the baronial branch of the Majorana: a family of the landed aristocracy. He married his first cousin Donna Ilaria Maria Paternò Castello di Carcaci from which he two sons: Giuseppe and Ferdinando.

He was president of the Provincial Farmers Association of Catania, and in 1947 he became mayor of Militello in Val di Catania with the support of the Common Man's Front. In April 1947 he was a candidate for the first regional elections in Sicily and in 1951 he took over in the first Sicilian Regional Assembly, where he had stood. Re-elected to the renewal of the ARS in 1952, still in the constituency of Catania, he joined the group of the Monarchist National Party, of which he was a member of the National Council. In 1955 he was confirmed with the PNM and was elected vice president of the Sicilian Regional Assembly.

He joined the transversal majority which led Silvio Milazzo to the presidency of the Region. In the 1959 elections he ran for the Social Christian Sicilian Union and was elected in the Catania constituency. In the following two governments of Milazzo he was vice president of the region and assessor for finance. The Christian Democracy, at that moment in the opposition, focused on him to overturn the majority and nominated him for the presidency of the Region. He was elected President of Sicily on 23 February 1960 and his government lasted until 29 June 1961. Disappointed by the attitude of the Christian Democrat leaders, he also resigned early as a deputy on 22 February 1963, joining the Italian Liberal Party. He was not re-elected and became national councilor of Confagricoltura.

In 1972 he was elected Senator in the Sicily district among the ranks of the Italian Social Movement and was a member of the agriculture commission until 1976.
