= Francesco Martino =

Francesco Martino may refer to:

- Francesco Martino (politician) (1937–2017), Italian politician and professor
- Francesco Martino (gymnast) (1900–1965), Italian gymnast and Olympic champion

== See also ==
- Francesco De Martino (1907–2002), Italian jurist and politician
