= Giuseppe Maria Sciacca =

Italian philosopher and teacher

Giuseppe Maria Sciacca (Messina, 1912 — Palermo, 1995) was an Italian philosopher and academic. A student and assistant of Antonio Renda, Sciacca's work focused on Kantianism.

Professor Emeritus of History of Philosophy of the Faculty of Arts of the University of Palermo, he was president of the Italian Philosophical Society. He expressed and exposed his philosophical thought through a number of written works.

== Bibliography ==
=== Written works ===
- Filosofi che si confessano, Guido D'anna editore, Messina (1896)
- Il fondamento della sterēsis nella "Filosofia dell'azione", Accademia di Scienze, Lettere ed Arti, Palermo (1949)
- Il concetto di tiranno, dai greci a Coluccio Salutati, U. Manfredi editore Palermo (1953)
- La visione della vita nell'Umanesimo e Coluccio Salutati, Palermo (1953)
- Politica e vita spirituale, ed. Palumbo, Palermo (1953)
- Gli Dei in Protagora, ed. Palumbo, Palermo (1958)
- Esistenza e realtà in Husserl, ed. Palumbo, Palermo (1960)
- Esistenza e realtà, Palermo (1962)
- L'Idea della libertà in Kant. Fondamento della coscienza etico-politica, ed. Palumbo, Palermo (1963)
- Scetticismo cristiano, ed. Palumbo, Palermo (1962)
- Ritorno alla saggezza, ed. Palumbo, Palermo (1971)
- L'uomo senza Adamo, ed. Palumbo, Palermo (1976)
- Sapere e alienazione, ed. Palumbo, Palermo (1981)
- Il Segno, quel Segno, ed. Cappelli, Bologna (1987)
