= Loggia (surname) =

Loggia is an Italian surname.

In Italy, it occurs over the North and Sicily, with higher concentrations in the areas surrounding Turin, and in the areas between Agrigento and Butera, suggesting Sicilian origins.

Branches of the Loggia family can also be found in the Philippines and the United States.

== People ==
- Enrico La Loggia (born 1947), Italian politician
- Robert Loggia (1930–2015), American actor
