= Pancrazio De Pasquale =

Italian politician (1925–1992)

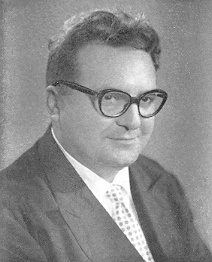

Member of the European Parliament
- In office 17 July 1979 – 24 July 1989
- Constituency: Italy

President of the Sicilian Regional Assembly
- In office 21 June 1976 – 2 March 1979
- Preceded by: Mario Fasino
- Succeeded by: Michelangelo Russo

Personal details
- Born: 6 August 1925 Giardini Naxos, Province of Messina, Sicily, Kingdom of Italy
- Died: 26 September 1992 (aged 67)
- Party: Italian Communist Party
- Occupation: Politician

Pancrazio De Pasquale (6 August 1925 – 26 September 1992) was an Italian politician. From 1979–1989, he served as a Member of the European Parliament. He was a member of the Communist Party of Italy. From 1979–1989, he served as Chair of the Committee on Regional Policy and Regional Planning. He served in the Chamber of Deputies of Italy in Legislature III, Legislature IV and Legislature XI. He served as President of the Sicilian Regional Assembly.
