= Autonomist Democrats =

The Autonomist Democrats (Democratici Autonomisti) were a social-democratic and liberal electoral list for the 2008 Sicilian regional election.

Its leading members included Maurizio Ballistreri, a former regional deputy for the Italian Democratic Socialists now leading member of the social-democratic faction within the Movement for Autonomy, and Salvatore Grillo, deputy secretary of the Italian Liberal Party.

The list won 3.8% of the vote, thus failing to surpass the 5% electoral threshold.

In May 2009 the party joined the Union of the Centre.
