= Pepi Fabbiano =

American astrophysicist

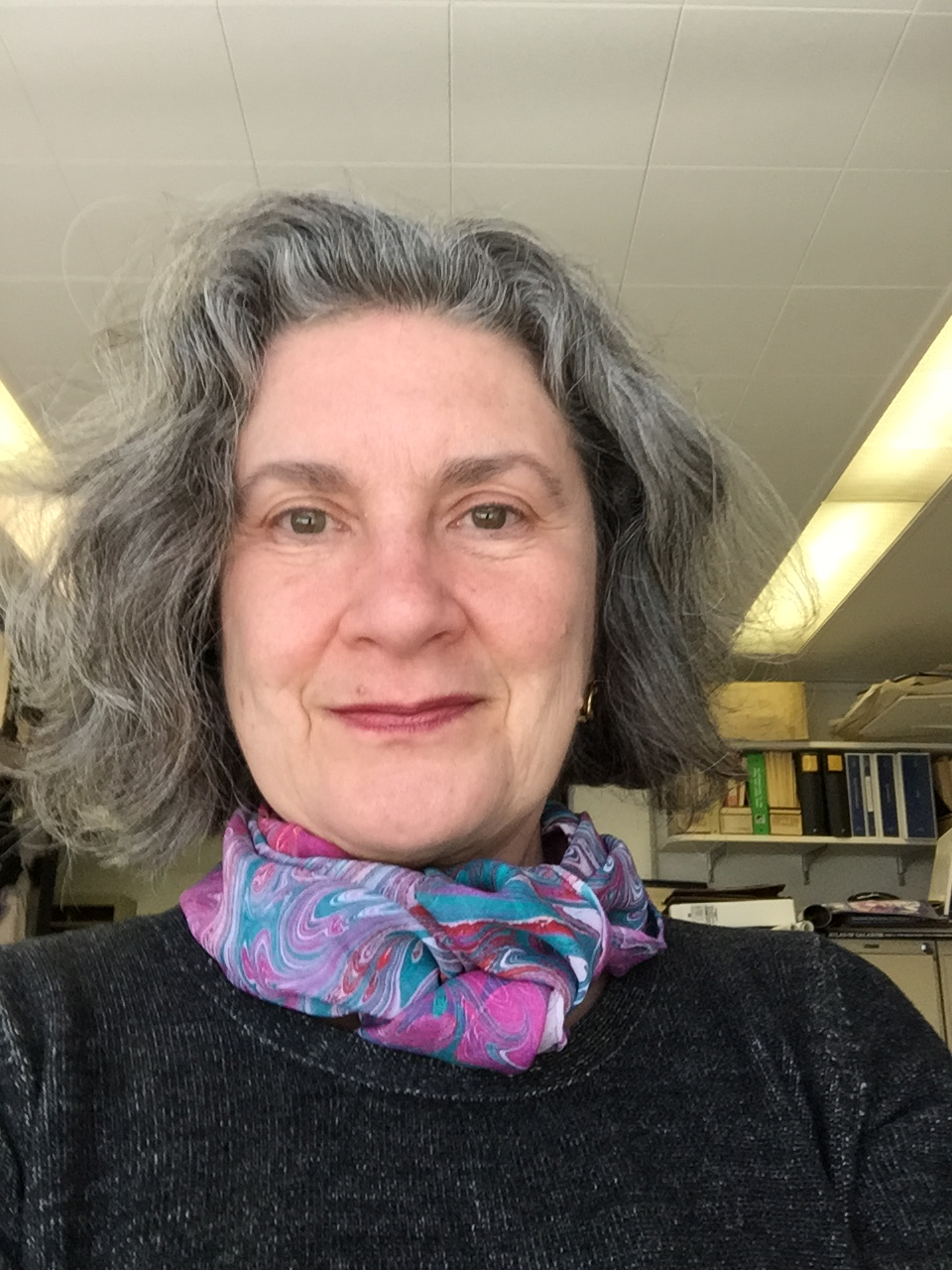
- Born: Giuseppina Fabbiano; Palermo, Italy

Academic background
- Education: University of Palermo
- Doctoral advisor: Pippo Vaiana

Academic work
- Institutions: Smithsonian Astrophysical Observatory

Giuseppina "Pepi" Fabbiano is an American astrophysicist. She works as senior astrophysics in the High Energy Astrophysics Division, at the Smithsonian Astrophysical Observatory. She has chaired the executive committee of the International Virtual Observatory Alliance. Fabbiano was elected a fellow of the AAAS (American Association for the Advancement of Science) in 2011 for her contribution to astronomy. In 2021 Fabbiano co-authored a paper that suggests that quasars can be used as a standard candle to determine cosmological distances at high redshifts.

== Life ==
She was born in Palermo, Italy. She earned the Ph.D. of physics from the University of Palermo in 1973. She studies black holes, cosmology and x-ray emission of galaxies.

== Early life ==
She was raised in a family of teachers and professors. In high school she won a math prize to visit France.

== Works ==
- Fabbiano (1989). "X rays from normal galaxies". Annual Review of Astronomy and Astrophysics. 27: 87–138. Bibcode:1989ARA&A..27...87F. doi:10.1146/annurev.aa.27.090189.000511.
- King, A. R.; Davies, M. B.; Ward, M. J.; Fabbiano, G.; Elvis, M. (2001-04-30). "Ultraluminous X-Ray Sources in External Galaxies". The Astrophysical Journal Letters. 552 (2): L109. arXiv:astro-ph/0104333. Bibcode:2001ApJ...552L.109K. doi:10.1086/320343. ISSN 1538-4357. S2CID 17364247.
- Fabbiano, G.; Kim, D. -W.; Trinchieri, G. (1992). "An X-ray catalog and atlas of galaxies". The Astrophysical Journal Supplement Series. 80: 531. Bibcode:1992ApJS...80..531F. doi:10.1086/191675.
- Vaiana, G. S.; Cassinelli, J. P.; Fabbiano, G.; Giacconi, R.; Golub, L.; Gorenstein, P.; Haisch, B. M.; Harnden, F. R.; Johnson, H. M.; Linsky, J. L.; Maxson, C. W.; Mewe, R.; Rosner, R.; Seward, F.; Topka, K.; Zwaan, C. (1981). "Results from an extensive Einstein stellar survey". The Astrophysical Journal. 245: 163. Bibcode:1981ApJ...245..163V. doi:10.1086/158797.
- E. J. A. Meurs; G. Fabbiano, eds. (15 June 2006). Populations of High-Energy Sources in Galaxies (IAU S230). Cambridge University Press. ISBN 978-0-521-85201-2.
- Bisogni, S.; Lusso, E.; Civano, F.; Nardini, E.; Risalti, G.; Elvis, M.; Fabbiano, G. (2021). "The Chandra view of the relation between X-ray and UV emission in quasars". Astronomy & Astrophysics manuscript no. lo_lx_arXiv

See also the list of Pepi Fabbiano's publications.
