= 1955 Sicilian regional election =

The 1955 Sicilian regional election took place on 5 June 1955.

Christian Democracy was by far the largest party, largely ahead of the Italian Communist Party. After the election Giuseppe Alessi and, later, Giuseppe La Loggia governed the Region at the head of a centre-right coalition that included the Italian Liberal Party, the Italian Democratic Socialist Party and, since 1956, the Italian Social Movement.

After a brief one-party government by La Loggia, Silvio Milazzo, a left-wing Christian Democrat, broke ranks, launched his own Social Christian Sicilian Union and formed a government that included the extremes: the left-wing Italian Communist Party (along with the Italian Socialist Party) on one side and the right-wing Italian Social Movement (along with the Monarchist National Party) on the other side.

== Results ==
Electoral system: proportional representation

Parties	votes	(%)	seats
Christian Democracy	897,397	38.6	39
Italian Communist Party	482,793	20.8	20
Monarchist National Party–People's Monarchist Party	295,745	12.7	8
Italian Socialist Party	225,720	9.7	10
Italian Social Movement	222,419	9.6	8
Italian Liberal Party	91,980	4.0	3
Italian Democratic Socialist Party–Italian Republican Party	72,351	3.1	2
Others	37,627	1.5	-
Total	2,326,032	100.0	90

Sources: Istituto Cattaneo and Sicilian Regional Assembly
