= Gaetano Galvagno =

Italian politician (born 1985)

President of the Sicilian Regional Assembly
- Incumbent
- Assumed office 10 November 2022
- Preceded by: Gianfranco Miccichè

Personal details
- Born: 15 February 1985 (age 41)
- Party: Brothers of Italy (since 2012)

Gaetano Galvagno (born 15 February 1985) is an Italian politician serving as a member of the Sicilian Regional Assembly since 2017. He has served as president of the assembly since 2022.
