= Enzo Sellerio =

Italian photographer

Enzo Sellerio (1924 – February 22, 2012) was an Italian photographer, publisher, and collector.

Born in 1924 in Palermo to an Italian father and a Russian mother, Sellerio studied law and was for some time a lecturer in law at the University of Palermo. He became a full-time photographer in the early 1950s.

In 1962 ZDF invited Sellerio, Hiroshi Hamaya and Will McBride to make a film on the German people; Mit offenen Augen was the result.

After a short period in the mid-1960s freelancing in the United States for Vogue and Fortune magazines, Sellerio moved toward publishing, and in 1969 started Sellerio editore with his wife. Sellerio would take direct charge of the art division of the company, which, as Enzo Sellerio editore, became independent in 1983. Among his publications are books about traditional Sicilian artifacts, many of them from his own collection.

Sellerio's black-and-white photographs depict most fairly public aspects of Sicilian life.

He died in Palermo in 2012, on February 22, aged 88.

== Books of Sellerio's photographs ==
- Palermo: Porträt einer Stadt. Special issue of Du (Zurich), 1961.
- Castelli e monasteri. Palermo, 1968.
- Inventario siciliano. Palermo: Sellerio, 1977.
- Enzo Sellerio ("I grandi fotografi"). Milan: Fabbri, 1983.
- Persone. Florence: Passigli, 1990.
- Enzo Sellerio fotografo ed editore, ed. Roberta Valtorta. Verona: WAP, 1991.
- Fotografo in Sicilia. Arti Grafiche Friulane, 1996. ISBN 88-86550-21-9
- A Photographer in Sicily, trans. Guido Waldman. London: Harvill, 1996. ISBN 1-86046-055-0
- Fotografie 1950-1989. Milan: Motta, 2000. ISBN 88-7179-236-X
- Milloss al Massimo. Milan: Motta, 2000. ISBN 88-7179-248-3 The work of the choreographer Aurel M. Milloss at Teatro Massimo.
- Per volontà o per caso. Florence: Edizioni della Meridiana, 2004. ISBN 88-87478-90-2
