= Social Christian Sicilian Union =

Italian political party

Social Christian Sicilian Union Unione Siciliana Cristiano Sociale
- Leader: Silvio Milazzo
- Founded: 1958
- Dissolved: c.1963
- Split from: Christian Democracy
- Ideology: Christian left Regionalism
- Political position: Centre to centre-left

The Social Christian Sicilian Union (Unione Siciliana Cristiano Sociale, USCS) was a Christian-leftist Italian political party active in Sicily.

== History ==
On 23 October 1958 Silvio Milazzo, regional deputy in Sicily for Christian Democracy and regional secretary of the party, was elected President of the Region by the Sicilian Regional Assembly with the votes of a part of DC, PCI, PSI, PNM and MSI, as opposed to Barbaro Lo Giudice, official Christian Democrat candidate. On 31 October Milazzo set up a regional government formed by the political forces that had elected him, including PCI and MSI. The vice president was Paolo D'Antoni, deputy for the Communist group, while Dino Grammatico and Ettore Mangano (MSI) were appointed Assessors for strategic Agriculture and for Industry and Commerce respectively. The agreement was supported by the then communist regional secretary Emanuele Macaluso and the MSI group leader Nino Buttafuoco.

Called to Rome by the party's council of arbitrators to clear himself, Milazzo refused to resign and was expelled from the DC; after a few days, on 8 November 1958, with other dissident deputies, he founded the USCS; it was the first example of breaking the unity of Catholics in politics. The event took the name of Milazzismo.

In the regional elections of 7 June 1959, the USCS scored 10.6% of the vote and 10 seats (out of 90), but the Christian Democracy, despite the split, kept its percentage of votes unchanged (38.6%). Milazzo formed two other short governments, which, however, the MSI no longer joined.

The Milazzo experiment went into crisis at the beginning of 1960, when one of its exponents, Benedetto Majorana della Nicchiara, was persuaded by the Christian Democracy to accept the position of President of the Region (where he was elected on 23 February), instead of Milazzo, who then in December 1962 also resigned from the position of regional deputy. At the general election of April 1963, the party presented lists to the Senate in some colleges in Sicily, and scored 43,355 votes and one seat (the Senator elected for the party was Sergio Marullo Di Condojanni).

In the subsequent regional election of 9 June 1963, the USCS suffered a severe defeat (0.8% of the votes and no seats), so after a short time it disbanded.
