= Francesco Cascio =

Italian politician

Francesco Cascio (born 17 September 1963) is an Italian politician and dentist.

Cascio was born in Palermo on 17 September 1963. He studied dentistry. Cascio was elected to two terms on the Chamber of Deputies, serving from 1994 to 2001. He then served three consecutive terms as a member of the Sicilian Regional Assembly, from 2001 to 2012. Between 2008 and 2012, Cascio was elevated to the president of the regional assembly.
