= Giuseppe Provenzano (Italian politician, born 1946) =

Italian politician

Giuseppe Provenzano (born 16 December 1946 in Palermo) is an Italian senior professor of economics and corporate financing at University of Brescia, vice-director of Scuola di Dirigenza Aziendale Luigi Bocconi in Milan and entrepreneur, but his notability is mostly connected to his experience as president of Sicily, Italian minister for Sicilian affairs and Sicilian secretary for health and care.

== Biography ==
Second of five siblings, Giuseppe Provenzano was born in one of the most important and richest families in Palermo, from Sebastiano Provenzano and Orsola Briuccia, rich landlords in the territories of Corleone. He spends his early years between Corleone, managing some affairs of his father's activities, and Palermo.

For the entire period of his lower studies (from elementary to high schools) he attends the Istituto San Luigi Gonzaga in Palermo, where he had as school mates some of the most important and influent future politicians of the regional and national scene, such as Enrico La Loggia, Leoluca Orlando, Gianfranco Micciché, Francesco Musotto, or notable future members of the Italian financial scene, such as Antonello Perricone or Gaetano Micciché.

He is the younger brother of Antonino Provenzano, incumbent Italian ambassador in Bratislava, and older brother of Paola Provenzano, an entrepreneur and member of the board of Confindustria (the Italian Organization of Industries) and president of AIDDA (the Italian Organization of Female Managers).

He is the father of three children.
