= Salvatore Lauricella =

Italian politician (1922–1996)

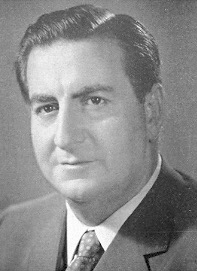

Minister for Scientific Research
- In office 13 December 1968 – 5 August 1969
- Prime Minister: Mariano Rumor
- Preceded by: Leopoldo Rubinacci
- Succeeded by: Arnaldo Forlani

Minister of Public Works
- In office 27 March 1970 – 17 February 1972
- Prime Minister: Mariano Rumor; Emilio Colombo
- Preceded by: Lorenzo Natali
- Succeeded by: Mario Ferrari Aggradi
- In office 7 July 1973 – 23 November 1974
- Prime Minister: Mariano Rumor
- Preceded by: Antonino Pietro Gullotti
- Succeeded by: Pietro Bucalossi

President of the ARS
- In office 21 June 1981 – 16 June 1991
- Preceded by: Michelangelo Russo
- Succeeded by: Paolo Piccione

Member of the Chamber of Deputies
- In office 16 May 1963 – 14 April 1994
- Constituency: Palermo-Agrigento

Personal details
- Born: 18 May 1922 Ravanusa, Sicily, Italy
- Died: 7 November 1996 (aged 74) Catania, Sicily, Italy
- Party: Christian Democracy
- Profession: Politician

Salvatore Lauricella (18 May 1922 – 7 November 1996) was an Italian attorney, politician, and chairman of the Italian Socialist Party.

He was the father of Giuseppe Lauricella, deputy of the Democratic Party.

== Biography ==
After obtaining a diploma from the "Pitagora" high school in Crotone, he graduated in law practicing the profession of lawyer, following in the footsteps of his father Giuseppe. In 1946, supported by the Italian Socialist Party, he became mayor of the country at the young age of 24. He was confirmed in this office for fourteen terms, until 1990, thus becoming one of the most enduring mayors of Italy.

He was regional secretary of the PSI in Sicily, as well as creator and promoter of the first center-left government in Italy, which was formed in the Sicilian Region through the agreement of the Christian Democracy of Giuseppe D'Angelo.

He was a national deputy from 1963, to 1981 and then from 1992 to 1994, in 1968 he became Minister for Scientific Research. In 1970 he became Minister of Public Works, in the Rumor and Colombo governments, and remained in office until 1974.

Within the PSI he joined the faction of Francesco De Martino. In 1976 he was among the candidates for the secretary of the PSI but eventually became the vice of Bettino Craxi; two years later he became the President of the PSI. In 1981 he left the national parliament and was elected regional deputy in Sicily. For two terms (1981 – 1991) he was president of the Sicilian Regional Assembly.

In 1992 he returned to the Chamber and in March 1994, after the Mani Pulite investigation and the crumbling of the PSI, he retired to private life.
