= 2008 Italian general election in Sicily =

The Italian general election of 2008 took place on 13–14 April 2008.

The People of Freedom was the largest party in Sicily with 46.6%, while the Democratic Party came second with 25.4%.

== Results ==
=== Chamber of Deputies ===
Coalitions leaders	votes	votes (%)	seats	Parties	votes	votes (%)	seats
Silvio Berlusconi	1,534,037	54.3	32	The People of Freedom	1,316,868	46.6	28
Silvio Berlusconi	1,534,037	54.3	32	Movement for Autonomy	217,169	7.7	4
Walter Veltroni	814,267	28.8	16	Democratic Party	718,494	25.4	14
Walter Veltroni	814,267	28.8	16	Italy of Values	95,773	3.4	2
Pier Ferdinando Casini	264,953	9.4	5	Union of the Centre	264,953	9.4	5
Fausto Bertinotti	74,457	2.6	-	The Left – The Rainbow	74,457	2.6	-
Daniela Santanchè	57,256	2.0	-	The Right	57,256	2.0	-
Enrico Boselli	17,365	0.6	-	Socialist Party	17,365	0.6	-
Others	61,612	2.2	-	Others	61,612	2.2	-
Total coalitions	2,823,947	100.0	53	Total parties	2,823,947	100.0	53

Source: Ministry of the Interior
