= Calogero Lo Giudice =

Italian politician (1938–2021)

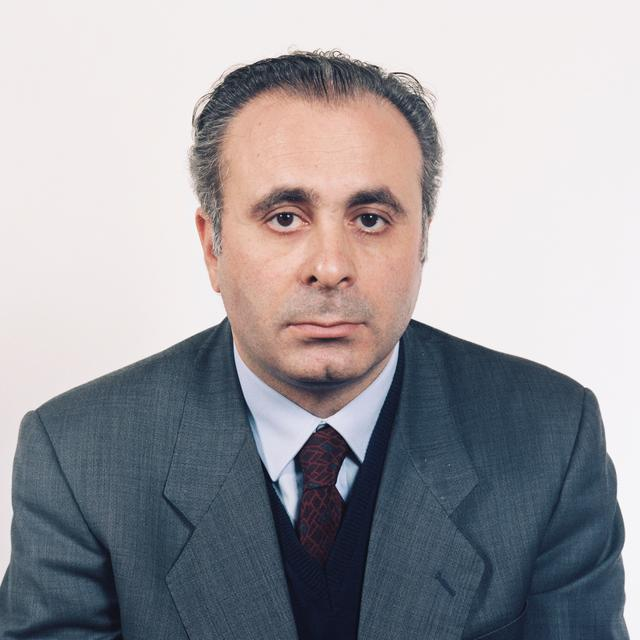
Image of Calogero Lo Giudice

Calogero Lo Giudice (16 June 1938 – 24 August 2021) was an Italian politician who served as President of Sicily and Member of the European Parliament.
