= Silvio Milazzo =

Italian politician (1903–1982)

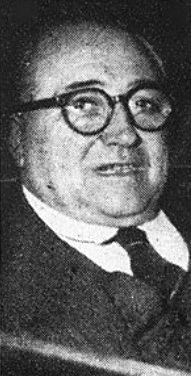
Milazzo as the Sicilian regional president

Silvio Milazzo (September 4, 1903 – December 24, 1982) was an Italian Christian Democracy politician and the president of Sicily from 1958 to 1960.

== Sicilian deputy ==
Milazzo was a landowner from Caltagirone and sat in the Sicilian regional parliament since 1947 for the Christian Democrat Party (DC) in the political current of Mario Scelba. He was the Regional Minister for Public Works and for Agriculture in the regional governments of Franco Restivo (1949-1955), Giuseppe Alessi (1955-1956) and Giuseppe La Loggia (1956-1958). He was a reliable party loyalist up to the time former Italian Premier Amintore Fanfani began to bring in bright young men from Rome into Sicily's Christian Democratic organization. Outraged by this infringement on Sicilian autonomy and threat to Sicilian patronage, Milazzo became the gullible protagonist of Sicilian autonomy.

After the regional elections of 1955, Milazzo, supported by the left and dissident Christian democrats, surprisingly had won the vote for head of the regional government against the outgoing president Restivo. However, the DC did not give its consent and after 37 minutes Milazzo was forced to renounce the appointment. He became vice-president under Giuseppe Alessi. It would be a prelude for the years to come.

== Regional president ==
In October 1958, Milazzo formed an atypical coalition government that was supported by Communists, Monarchists, Neo-Fascists and dissident Christian Democrats, breaking the power monopoly of the DC, that had ruled Sicily since 1947. Despite the expulsion of Milazzo and his followers from the party, he continued to head the Sicilian regional government. The expelled members formed a new party, the Social Christian Sicilian Union (Unione Siciliana Cristiano Sociale, USCS), in December 1958. He competed in the regional elections in June 1959 under the slogan "Sicily for the Sicilians. Down with the mainland."

The Christian Democrat party establishment appealed to the Vatican to counter Milazzo. Armed with a papal decree banning Catholics to vote for any candidate allied with Communists, Sicily's Cardinal Ernesto Ruffini sent Catholic Action groups from door to door to campaign against Milazzo. In the US, the Hearst press implored its Italian-American readers to send anti-Milazzo letters and telegrams to Sicily; advising the use of night-rate cables. The New York Journal American pleaded: "Even $2.75 is a small price for preserving democracy."

Milazzo said: "They have called me a Trojan horse. But I am not that. I am a pure-blooded Sicilian horse, a noble animal. I am an anti-Communist leading only a rebellion against the injustices of Rome." After the indecisive regional elections in June 1959 in which the UCSC gained 10 per cent of the votes, Milazzo again succeeded in forming a majority coalition with the aid of Christian Democratic defectors.

== Downfall ==
Milazzo was under constant pressure from the Vatican and the Christian Democratic national government led by Antonio Segni, and spent most of his time trying to defend his two-vote majority in Sicily's regional Assembly. In February 1960, Milazzo resigned, after a regional deputy revealed that he was approached to change allegiance for a substantial amount of money by one of Milazzo's top aides, the Communist Ludovico Corrao.

The nation's anti-Communist press and politicians seized the occasion to remove the Italian Communists from their one real foothold in Italy. "An unheard-of attempt at corruption," Milan's Corriere della Sera headlined. The Communist maintained a bewildered silence. Rome's pro-Communist newspaper Paese Sera claimed that Milazzo was the victim of a Mafia plot.

== Allegations of Mafia backing ==
On the contrary, rumours about Mafia backing of Milazzo's government were confirmed in the 1980s by several Mafia turncoats (pentiti), such as Tommaso Buscetta and Antonio Calderone. Both the Mafia clan in Catania and the Cosa Nostra-backed entrepreneur Costanzo campaigned for Milazzo. The Salvo cousins supported the Milazzo government as well as the old Mafia families of Greco and Bontade.

The Operation Milazzo, as it was called, was something of a clientelist “coup”, according to scholar René Seindal. The Christian Democrats lost control of the region's resources and the various parts of Milazzo's coalition strengthened their negotiating position towards the Christian Democrats. The Salvos, for instance, gained control over the private concession for collecting taxes in Sicily with extremely favourable conditions. To consolidate the privilege, the Salvos unscrupulously withdrew their support for Milazzo to ally themselves with the mainstream Christian Democrats which tried to regain control of the region to maintain their cliental power base.

From then until the mid-1980s the Salvos were among the most powerful businessmen in the economic, political and social life of Sicily – until they were prosecuted by Palermo's Antimafia pool that included Giovanni Falcone and Paolo Borsellino. They controlled the Christian Democratic party branch in the Province of Trapani that guaranteed them great influence over the regional decision making of the DC. After initially supporting Milazzo, the Mafia was not opposed to the fall of his government as well – and Mafia boss Francesco Paolo Bontade and later his son Stefano Bontade sustained a close relationship with the Salvo cousins, which allowed them access to regional politics.
