= 2019 European Parliament election in Sicily =

The European Parliament election of 2019 took place in Italy on 26 May 2019.

In Sicily the Five Star Movement came first with 31.2% of the vote (+14.1pp than at country-level), ahead of the League (20.8%; –13.5pp), Forza Italia (17.0%; +8.2pp), the Democratic Party (16.6; –6.1pp), Brothers of Italy (7.6%; +1.1pp), More Europe (1.9%), Green Europe (1.5%) and The Left (1.2%).

== Results ==
Party	Votes	%
Five Star Movement	479,562	31.2
League	319,439	20.8
Forza Italia	261,340	17.0
Democratic Party	255,741	16.6
Brothers of Italy	117,131	7.6
More Europe	29,089	1.9
Green Europe	22,487	1.5
The Left	18,009	1.2
others	35,137	2.3
Total	1,537,935	100.00

Source: Ministry of the Interior
