= Rosario Crocetta =

Italian politician (born 1951)

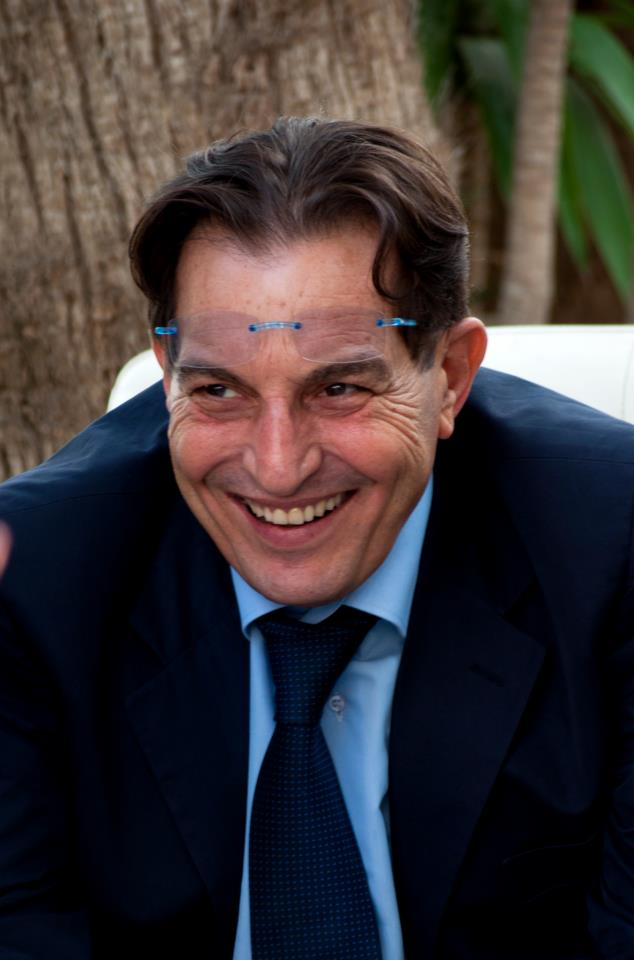

President of Sicily
- In office 10 November 2012 – 18 November 2017
- Preceded by: Raffaele Lombardo
- Succeeded by: Nello Musumeci

Member of the European Parliament for Italian Islands
- In office 14 July 2009 – 16 December 2012

Mayor of Gela
- In office 18 March 2003 – 23 September 2009
- Preceded by: Giovanni Scaglione
- Succeeded by: Rosolino Greco

Personal details
- Born: 8 February 1951 (age 75) Gela, Sicily, Italy
- Party: PCI (until 1991); PRC (1991–2000); PdCI (2000–2008); PD (since 2008)

Rosario Crocetta (born 8 February 1951) is an Italian politician. He was the first openly gay mayor in Italy when he became Mayor of Gela in 2003, a post he held until 2009.

A prominent figure in the fight against the Sicilian Mafia, in 2009 he was elected as a Member of the European Parliament (MEP). He was President of Sicily between 2012 and 2017 following the 2012 Sicilian regional election, thus becoming the second openly gay head of a regional government in Italy after Nichi Vendola.

== Biography ==
Born in Gela, Sicily, in 1951, Crocetta is the son of a water-worker and a seamstress. His older brother is former PCI senator Salvatore Crocetta. After having received his diploma he worked for ENI in Gela.

He says he speaks four languages: Italian, Arabic, English and French and has been heard speaking and has posted on social media in the Sicilian language.

== Political career ==
Crocetta started his political career in the 1980s within the Italian Communist Party (dissolved in 1991), later joining the Communist Refoundation Party. In 1998, he was appointed as Councillor for Culture in the City Council of Gela with the Federation of the Greens, and was engaged in cultural projects shared between Mediterranean countries. In 2000, he joined the Party of Italian Communists. In 2001-2002 he worked as a Councillor for Public Education in Gela.

In May 2002, he contested the mayoral elections for Gela as a center-left coalition candidate. At first, right-wing candidate Giovanni Scaglione was declared elected, with a narrow margin of 197 votes. But in 2003, the Administrative Court of Sicily established that electoral frauds took place in town elections and subsequently proclaimed Crocetta as mayor. Telephone tappings revealed that a local Mafia boss ordered a returning officer to "move heaven and earth in order to avoid the communist faggot to win". Since then, being the first openly gay mayor of Italy, he became for many a symbol of the fight against obscurantism and organized crime in Sicily. In 2007, he was re-elected mayor of Gela with 64.4 percent of the vote.

In 2008, he joined the Democratic Party. In the 2009 European elections, he was elected as a member of the European Parliament for the Italian Islands constituency with 150,091 votes. In 2012, Crocetta ran as gubernatorial candidate against Sebastiano "Nello" Musumeci of Berlusconi's PDL party and eight other minor party candidates. Crocetta ran in Sicily on the ticket of La Rivoluzione è Già Iniziata (The Revolution Has Already Started) and obtained 30.5 percent of the votes, becoming the first left-wing governor of Sicily since 1947.

From 2013 to 2017, he was also a member of the Committee of the Regions.

On 19 July 2017, Rosario Crocetta announced his candidacy to the presidency at the November regional elections, with the list The Megaphone – Crocetta List, without the support of the Democratic Party. After the decision of the Democratic Party to nominate the rector of the University of Palermo Fabrizio Micari, on 3 September 2017 Crocetta withdrew from the race, and instead supporting Micari with his list.

== Fight against Mafia and assassination attempts ==
Throughout his political career, Crocetta has been a forthright proponent of the fight against organized crime in Sicily. Consequently, he has been the target of several Mafia attacks.

In 2003, a plot to kill Crocetta during the patronal feast of the Immaculate Conception involving a Lithuanian killer was thwarted by the local Carabinieri. After that episode, Crocetta was placed under security.

In 2008, a failed plan to kill Crocetta was made public by the district attorney of Caltanissetta; as a result, Crocetta was immediately placed under tighter security.

In 2010, a new assassination plot against Crocetta was thwarted, and five people affiliated with the local Mafia were arrested.

== Personal life ==
Crocetta is openly gay. He was the first openly gay mayor in Italy when he became Mayor of Gela in 2003 till 2009. He is also the second openly gay head of a regional government in Italy after Nichi Vendola when he was the President of Sicily between 2012 and 2017.

== See also ==
- List of openly LGBT heads of government
- Politics of Italy
