= Enrico La Loggia =

Italian politician and lawyer

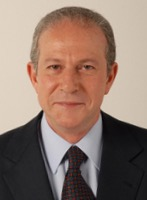

Minister of Regional Affairs
- In office 11 June 2001 – 17 May 2006
- Prime Minister: Silvio Berlusconi
- Preceded by: Agazio Loiero
- Succeeded by: Linda Lanzillotta

Member of the Chamber of Deputies
- In office 28 April 2006 – 14 March 2013

Member of the Senate
- In office 15 April 1994 – 28 April 2006

Personal details
- Born: 25 February 1947 (age 79) Agrigento, Italy
- Party: DC (1985-1994); Forza Italia (1994-2009); PdL (2009-2013)
- Education: Bocconi University
- Occupation: Politician, lawyer, academic

Enrico La Loggia (born 25 February 1947) is an Italian politician, former Minister of Regional Affairs from 2001 to 2006.

== Biography ==
Son of former President of Sicily Giuseppe La Loggia, Enrico graduated in law at the Bocconi University in Milan and taught State Accounting at the University of Palermo. He practices the profession of a cassation lawyer and an official auditor.

He is elected for the first time in the city council of Palermo with the Christian Democracy in 1985 and is appointed councilor for cultural heritage, from 1987 to 1991, and councilor for urban police, from 1991 to 1992.

In 1994, La Loggia joined Silvio Berlusconi's Forza Italia, with which he is elected Senator in 1994, in 1996 and in 2001. In 1996, he was the official candidate for the office of President of the Senate, but is defeated by former Minister of the Interior Nicola Mancino.

From 2001 to 2006, La Loggia is appointed Minister of Regional Affairs in the Berlusconi II Cabinet and the Berlusconi III Cabinet.

In 2006 and 2008, La Loggia is elected to the Chamber of Deputies with Forza Italia and then with the People of Freedom, holding his seat until 2013.
