= Francesco Martino (politician) =

Italian politician (1937–2017)

President of Sicily
- In office 21 December 1993 – 16 May 1995
- Preceded by: Giuseppe Campione
- Succeeded by: Matteo Graziano

Personal details
- Born: 24 March 1937 Messina, Sicily, Italy
- Died: 3 October 2017 (aged 80) Messina, Sicily, Italy
- Party: Italian Liberal Party

Francesco Martino (24 March 1937 – 3 October 2017) was an Italian politician, and the President of Sicily from 1993 to 1995.

== Biography ==
University professor in Messina, he was the nephew of the former foreign minister Gaetano Martino. Exponent of the Italian Liberal Party, he was elected provincial councilor in Messina.

In 1976 he was elected deputy to the Sicilian Regional Assembly on the PLI list and was re-elected for four legislatures, until 1996. He was regional assessor for the Territory from 1981 to 1982 and for Industry from 1984 to 1985 and from 1986 to 1987.

He was president of the Sicilian Region in a centrist government (48th), from 21 December 1993 to 16 May 1995, after the season of the mafia massacres, in a moment of transition of the First Republic.

Later he made an experience in the Committee of the Regions of the European Union and then retired from politics.
