= Christian Democracy Sicily =

Christian Democracy Sicily Democrazia Cristiana Sicilia
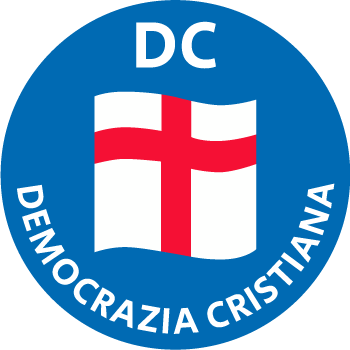
- Leader: Salvatore Cuffaro
- Secretary: Stefano Cirillo
- Founded: 29 October 2020
- Headquarters: Viale della Libertà 34, Palermo
- Ideology: Christian democracy
- Political position: Centre to centre-right
- National affiliation: Christian Democracy; Centre-right coalition
- Chamber of Deputies: 0 / 400
- Senate: 0 / 200
- European Parliament: 0 / 76
- Sicilian Regional Assembly: 4 / 70

Website
- www.democraziacristianasicilia.it

Christian Democracy Sicily (Italian: Democrazia Cristiana Sicilia, DCS), also known as New Christian Democracy (Nuova Democrazia Cristiana), is a Christian-democratic political party based in Sicily, Italy. Its leader is Salvatore Cuffaro, a former President of Sicily.

The party is the regional section of one of the political parties named Christian Democracy, of which Cuffaro was elected secretary in 2023.

== History ==
In October 2020, Cuffaro launched the DCS, in connection with the Christian Democracy led by Renato Grassi and Renzo Gubert. The party ran for the first time with its own list in the municipal elections of 2021 in Sicily, obtaining good results and several seats (11.5% and three seats in Favara, 6.4% and one seat in Giarre, 6.7% and one seat in Caltagirone and 4.4% in San Cataldo).

In March 2022, the party reached an agreement with Us of the Centre of Clemente Mastella looking forward the following elections. However, in the municipal elections of June, the party ran in a joint list with Us with Italy in Messina (1.6%) and in Niscemi (10.1% and two seats), while ran with an autonomous list in Palermo, in support of Roberto Lagalla (5.5% and three seats) and in Aci Catena (7.5% and one seat).

In August 2022, in the run-up of the 2022 regional election, Cuffaro announced his party's support for Renato Schifani. In the election, the DCS obtained 6.5% of the vote within the centre-right coalition, electing five deputies to the Sicilian Regional Assembly.

In January 2023, MEP Francesca Donato, a former member of the League, joined the DCS.

In May 2023, Cuffaro was elected national secretary of the Christian Democracy.

== Electoral results ==
=== Regional elections ===
| Election | Leader | Votes | % | Seats | +/− |
|---|---|---|---|---|---|
| 2022 | Salvatore Cuffaro | 121,691 (8th) | 6.5 | 5 / 70 | New |
