= 1947 Sicilian regional election =

The 1947 Sicilian regional election took place on 20 April 1947. They were the first-ever election of the Sicilian Parliament.

The electoral alliance between the Italian Communist Party and the Italian Socialist Party was the most voted list. However, after the election Giuseppe Alessi and, later, Franco Restivo, both Christian Democrats, governed the Region at the head of broad centrist coalitions.

== Results ==
Electoral system: proportional representation with Hare quota

Party	Votes	%	Seats
People's Bloc (PCI–PSI–PdA)	591,870	30.4	29
Christian Democracy	400,084	20.5	20
Liberal Democratic Bloc (PLI–UQ)	287,698	14.8	12
Monarchist National Party	185,423	9.5	10
Movement for the Independence of Sicily	171,470	8.8	9
Italian Workers' Socialist Party	82,175	4.2	4
Italian Republican Party	74,570	3.8	3
Sicilian Democratic Union	40,149	2.1	1
Common Man's Front	30,179	1.5	1
Labour Democratic Party	21,433	1.1	1
Others	63,409	3.3	–
Total	1,948,460	100.0	90
Source: Istituto Cattaneo – Sicilian Regional Assembly
