= 1959 Sicilian regional election =

The 1959 Sicilian regional election took place on 7 June 1959.

Christian Democracy was by far the largest party, largely ahead of the Italian Communist Party. After the election Silvio Milazzo, leader of the Social Christian Sicilian Union and incumbent president, formed a new government that included the Italian Communist Party, the Italian Social Movement and the Italian Democratic Party.

The coalition, albeit with some minor changes, continued to lead the Region under Benedetto Majorana della Nicchiara (1960–1961) and was finally replaced by a coalition including the official Christian Democracy and the Socialists in 1961 (organic Centre-left), under President Giuseppe D'Angelo, a Christian Democrat.

== Results ==
Electoral system: proportional representation

Parties	votes	votes (%)	seats
Christian Democracy	937,734	38.6	33
Italian Communist Party	518,611	21.3	21
Social Christian Sicilian Union	257,023	10.6	9
Italian Socialist Party	237,708	9.8	12
Italian Social Movement	183,788	7.6	8
Italian Democratic Party	115,296	4.7	3
Italian Liberal Party	90,890	3.7	2
Italian Democratic Socialist Party	52,583	2.2	2
Others	35,587	1.5	-
Total	2,426,220	100.0	90

Sources: Istituto Cattaneo and Sicilian Regional Assembly
