= 2008 Sicilian regional election =

- 13 and 14 April 2008

All 90 seats to the Sicilian Regional Assembly
- Turnout: 66.68% (▲7.52%)
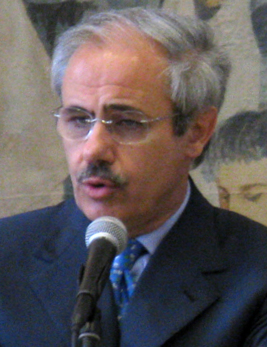

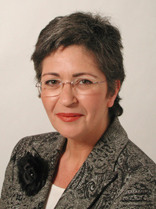
	Majority party	Minority party
Leader	Raffaele Lombardo	Anna Finocchiaro
Party	Movement for Autonomy	Democratic Party
Alliance	Centre-right	Centre-left
Seats won	61	29
Seat change	▼1	▲1
Popular vote	1,862,959	866,044
Percentage	65.4%	30.4%
Swing	▲11.3%	▼11.2%
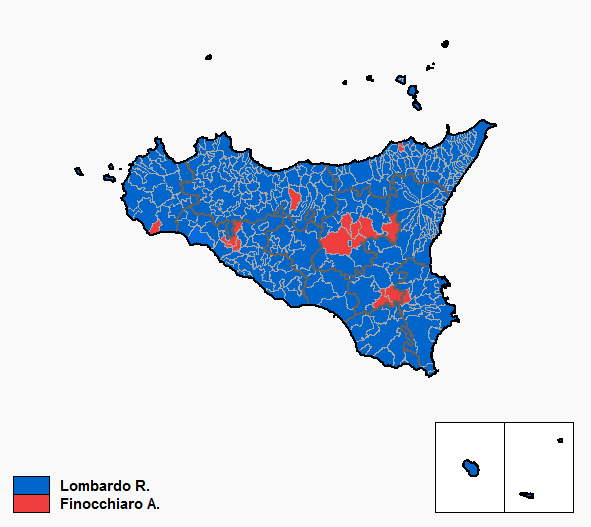
President before election
Salvatore Cuffaro
UDC
President-elect
Raffaele Lombardo
MpA

The 2008 Sicilian regional election for the renewal of the Sicilian Regional Assembly and the election of the Presidency of Sicily, Italy, was held on 13 and on 14 April 2008.

The election was competed by two main competitors: Raffaele Lombardo for the centre-right and Anna Finocchiaro for the centre-left. Lombardo won by a landslide, 65.3% against 30.4% of Finocchiaro.

== Results ==
14 April 2008 Sicilian regional election results
Candidates	Votes	%	Seats	Parties	Votes	%	Seats
Raffaele Lombardo	1,862,959	62.35	1				
Raffaele Lombardo	1,862,959	62.35	1	The People of Freedom	900,149	32.42	34
Raffaele Lombardo	1,862,959	62.35	1	Movement for Autonomy	371,418	13.95	15
Raffaele Lombardo	1,862,959	62.35	1	Union of the Centre	336,826	12.51	11
Raffaele Lombardo	1,862,959	62.35	1	Lombardo for President	119,892	4.45	–
Raffaele Lombardo	1,862,959	62.35	1	Autonomist Democrats	101,449	3.76	–
Raffaele Lombardo	1,862,959	62.35	1	Total	1,833,903	68.09	60
Anna Finocchiaro	866,044	30.38	9				
Anna Finocchiaro	866,044	30.38	9	Democratic Party	505,420	18.75	20
Anna Finocchiaro	866,044	30.38	9	The Left – The Rainbow	131,213	4.87	–
Anna Finocchiaro	866,044	30.38	9	Finocchiaro for President	83,700	3.11	–
Anna Finocchiaro	866,044	30.38	9	Italy of Values	49,726	1.85	–
Anna Finocchiaro	866,044	30.38	9	Total	770,059	28.59	20
Sonia Alfano	69,551	2.44	–	Friends of Beppe Grillo	46,396	1.72	–
Ruggero Razza	45,605	1.60	–	The Right – Tricolour Flame	39,143	1.45	–
Giuseppe Bonanno Conti	6,606	0.23	–	New Force	3,876	0.14	–
Total candidates	2,850,725	100.00	10	Total parties	2,693,377	100.00	80
Source: Sicilian Region

Popular vote
PdL	32.42%
PD	18.75%
MpA	13.92%
UDC	12.51%
SA	4.87%
LP	4.45%
AD	3.76%
FP	3.11%

President
Lombardo	63.35%
Finocchiaro	30.38%
Alfano	2.44%
Razza	1.60%
Conti	0.23%
