= 2001 Sicilian regional election =

- 24 June 2001

All 90 seats to the Sicilian Regional Assembly
- Turnout: 63.5%
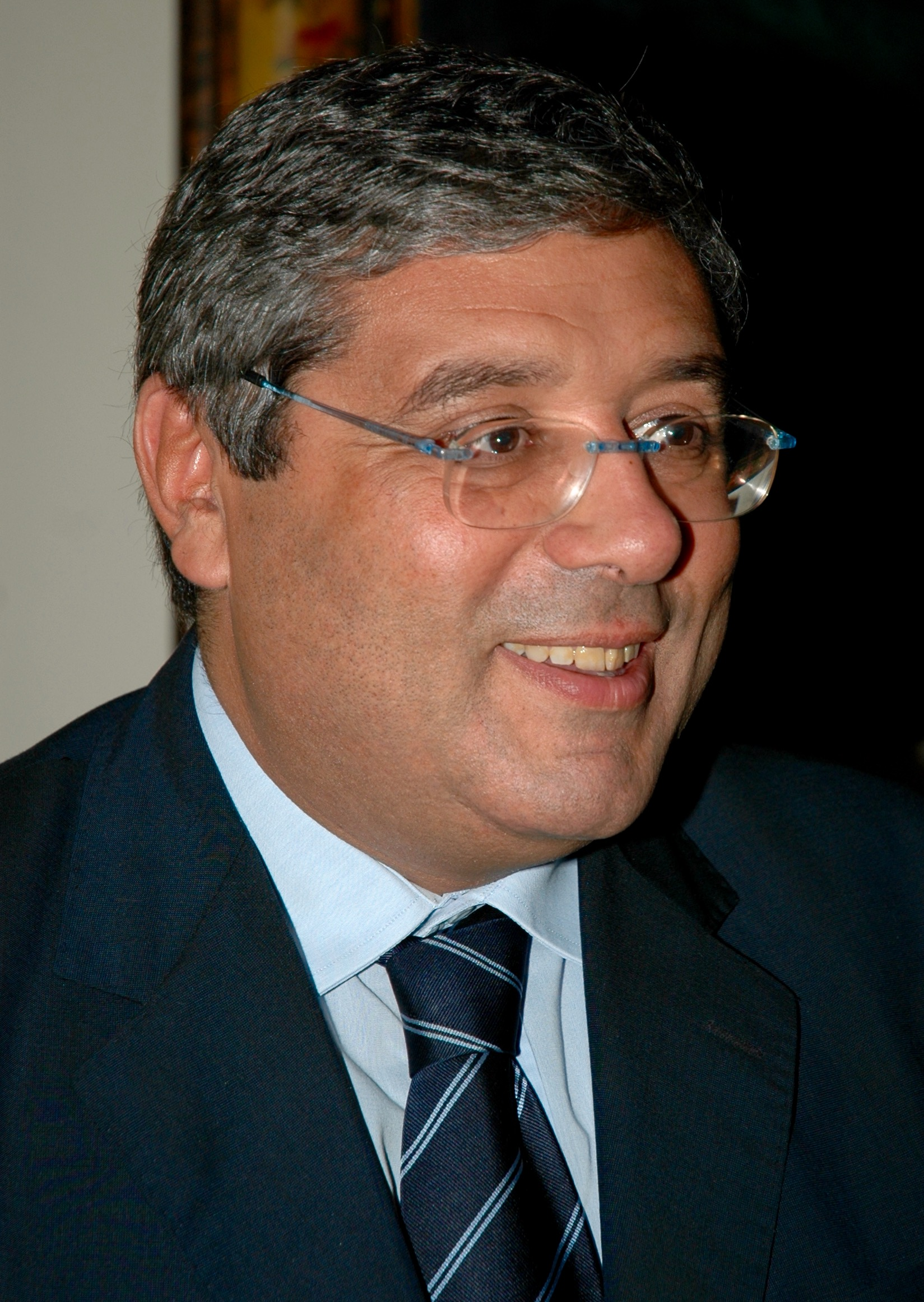

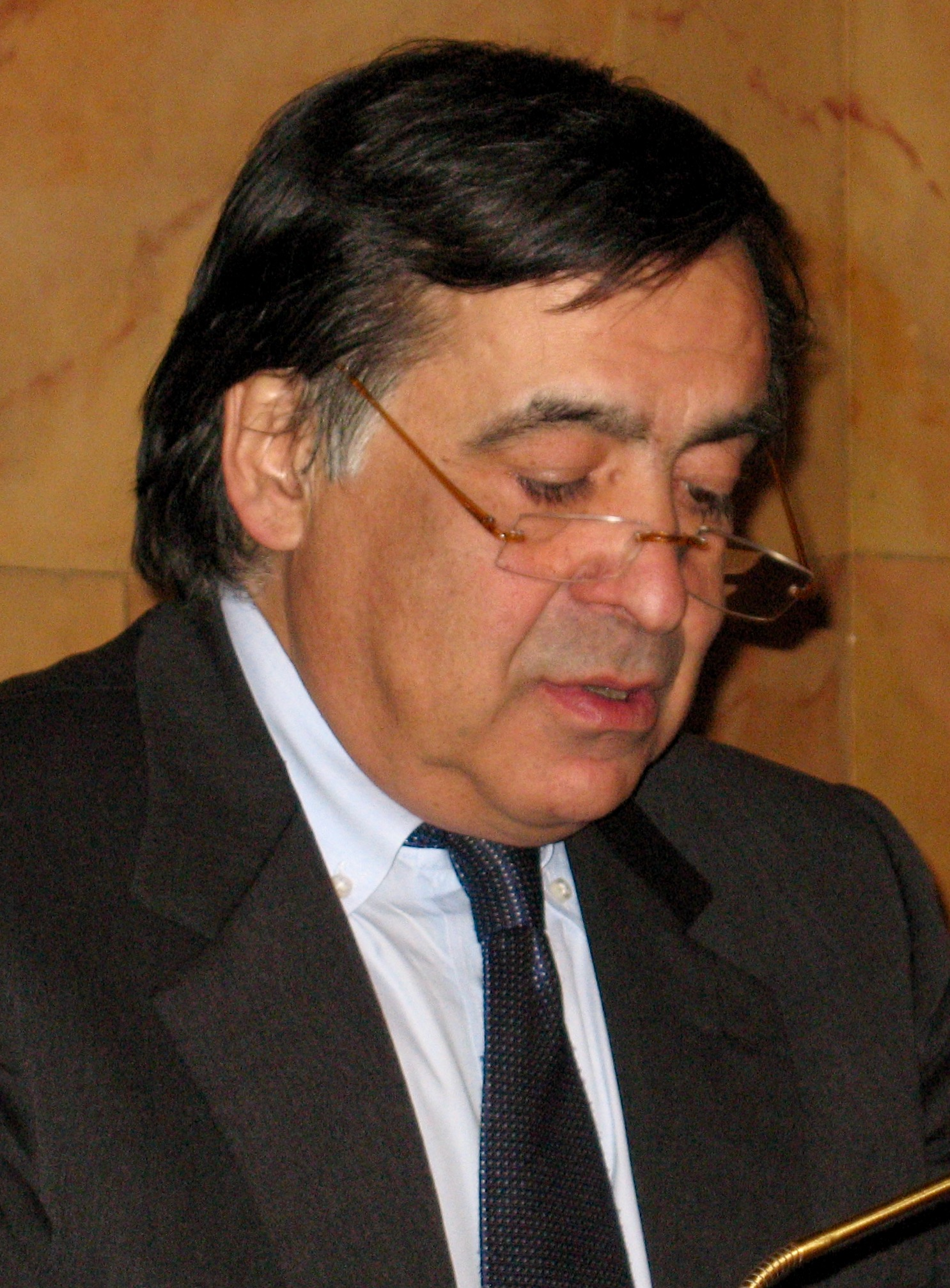
	Majority party	Minority party
Leader	Salvatore Cuffaro	Leoluca Orlando
Party	CDU	The Daisy
Alliance	House of Freedoms	The Olive Tree
Seats won	57	29
Popular vote	1,572,178	972,010
Percentage	59.1%	36.6%
President before election
Vincenzo Leanza
FI
President-elect
Salvatore Cuffaro
UDC

The 2001 Sicilian regional election was held on 24 June 2001. For the first time the president of Region was elected directly by the citizens.

The election was competed by three competitors: Salvatore Cuffaro, House of Freedoms candidate; Leoluca Orlando, candidate of The Olive Tree and former mayor of Palermo; and Sergio D'Antoni, leader of European Democracy. Cuffaro won by a landslide.

== Results ==
24 June 2001 Sicilian regional election results
Candidates	Votes	%	Seats	Parties	Votes	%	Seats
Salvatore Cuffaro	1,572,178	59.1	9				
Salvatore Cuffaro	1,572,178	59.1	9	Forza Italia	628,020	25.1	20
Salvatore Cuffaro	1,572,178	59.1	9	National Alliance	281,704	11.3	8
Salvatore Cuffaro	1,572,178	59.1	9	Christian Democratic Centre	223,420	8.9	6
Salvatore Cuffaro	1,572,178	59.1	9	United Christian Democrats	215,047	8.6	6
Salvatore Cuffaro	1,572,178	59.1	9	New Sicily	101,368	4.1	3
Salvatore Cuffaro	1,572,178	59.1	9	New Italian Socialist Party	69,697	2.8	2
Salvatore Cuffaro	1,572,178	59.1	9	Whiteflower	54,550	2.2	1
Salvatore Cuffaro	1,572,178	59.1	9	Liberal Socialists	24,110	1.0	1
Salvatore Cuffaro	1,572,178	59.1	9	Italian Republican Party	22,110	0.9	1
Salvatore Cuffaro	1,572,178	59.1	9	Tricolour Flame	9,224	0.4	–
Salvatore Cuffaro	1,572,178	59.1	9	Total	1,629,250	65.3	48
Leoluca Orlando	972,010	36.6	1				
Leoluca Orlando	972,010	36.6	1	Democrats of the Left	253,522	10.3	10
Leoluca Orlando	972,010	36.6	1	Democracy is Freedom – The Daisy	199,303	8.0	7
Leoluca Orlando	972,010	36.6	1	The Daisy for Sicily	107,516	4.3	4
Leoluca Orlando	972,010	36.6	1	Communist Refoundation Party	61,068	2.4	3
Leoluca Orlando	972,010	36.6	1	Italian Democratic Socialists	46,903	1.9	1
Leoluca Orlando	972,010	36.6	1	Sicilian Spring	29,564	1.2	1
Leoluca Orlando	972,010	36.6	1	Party of Italian Communists	28,826	1.2	1
Leoluca Orlando	972,010	36.6	1	Italy of Values	25,888	1.0	1
Leoluca Orlando	972,010	36.6	1	We Sicilians	2,382	0.1	–
Leoluca Orlando	972,010	36.6	1	Total	754,972	26.1	28
Sergio D'Antoni	114,799	4.3	–	European Democracy	113,664	4.5	4
Total candidates	2,658,987	100.00	10	Total parties	2,498,244	100.00	80
Source: Sicilian Region
