= 1951 Sicilian regional election =

The 1951 Sicilian regional election took place on 3 June 1951 to select the Second Sicilian Parliament.

Christian Democracy resulted narrowly ahead of the alliance between the Italian Communist Party and the Italian Socialist Party. After the election Franco Restivo, the incumbent Christian Democratic President, formed a government that included the Monarchist National Party and the Autonomist Independentist Liberal Sicilian Union, a spin-off of declined Sicilian independentists.

== Results ==
Electoral system: proportional representation

Parties	Votes	%	Seats
Christian Democracy	666,268	31.2	31
People's Bloc (incl. PCI, PSI)	644,784	30.2	31
Italian Social Movement	273,772	12.8	12
Monarchist National Party	177,533	8.3	6
Sicilian Democratic Union	82,591	3.9	2
Autonomist Independentist Liberal Sicilian Union	48,877	2.3	1
Italian Workers' Socialist Party	43,833	2.1	2
Italian Republican Party	35,546	1.7	–
Democratic Union	27,861	1.3	1
Socialist Unity	19,442	0.9	1
Italian Sicily Group	18,427	0.9	1
Liberal Monarchical Bloc	18,222	0.9	1
Autonomist and Independentist Rally	17,943	0.9	1
Others	88,197	4.0	–
Total	2,135,435	100.0	90

Sources: Istituto Cattaneo and Sicilian Regional Assembly
