= Mario D'Acquisto =

Italian politician (1931–2026)

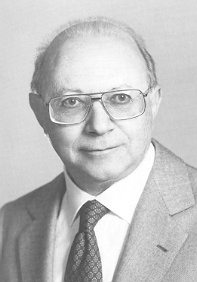
Mario D'Acquisto

Mario D'Acquisto (12 January 1931 – 9 March 2026) was an Italian politician.

== Life and career ==
D'Acquisto was born in Palermo on 12 January 1931. He was president of the Sicilian Region from 1980 to 1982 and vice-president of the Chamber of Deputies from 1992 to 1993. In the seventies he held the position of first citizen of the municipality of Mezzojuso (PA).

In 1980, he succeeded Piersanti Mattarella as leader of the Sicilian region. Mattarella was assassinated by the Sicilian Mafia, and during D'Acquisto's leadership, a number of others were assassinated, including politician Pio La Torre. During Torre's funeral, D'Acquisto was jeered when making a speech.

D'Acquisto died on 9 March 2026, at the age of 95.
