= University of Palermo =

Public research university in Palermo, Italy

Coordinates: 38.1177°N 13.3701°E

- Università degli Studi di Palermo
- Type: Public
- Established: 1806; 220 years ago
- Affiliations: UNIMED
- Rector: Massimo Midiri
- Administrative staff: 2,000
- Students: 48,338
- Location: Palermo, Italy
- Campus: Urban
- Sports teams: CUS Palermo
- Website: Official website

The University of Palermo (Italian: Università degli Studi di Palermo) is a public research university in Palermo, Italy. It was founded in 1806, and is currently organized in 12 faculties.

== History ==
The University of Palermo was officially founded in 1806, although its earliest roots date back to 1498 when medicine and law were taught there. Starting from the second half of the 16th century, from their seat at the Collegio Massimo al Cassero, the Jesuit Fathers granted degrees in Theology and Philosophy - subjects in which they had been masters for over 200 years.

In 1767 they were expelled from the kingdom by Ferdinand I, until 37 years later, when they returned to take their seat - which in the meantime had been turned into the Regia Accademia.

At this time, Ferdinand I decided to grant a good seat to the Accademia, moving its location to the Convent of the Teatini Fathers next to the Church of St. Giuseppe. In 1806, the university was officially founded.

After the unification of Italy in 1860, the University of Palermo was modernized under the impetus of the chemist Stanislao Cannizzaro, and the minister and specialist in Arab studies, Michele Amari, more or less assuming its present appearance. Since 1984 the main building of the university, housing the Rector's office, is Palazzo Chiaramonte-Steri, one of the most important historical buildings in Palermo, built in 1307 and formerly the residence of the Chiaramonte. Not far from Palazzo Steri, on land formerly belonging to the Chiaramonte, the Botanical Gardens of Palermo constitute a renowned part of the university.

Today, the university has grown to be an institution of about 2000 lecturers and 50,000 students in which research in various fields of study is carried out. In the past few years, the university has actively taken part in international cooperation programmes.

== Organization ==
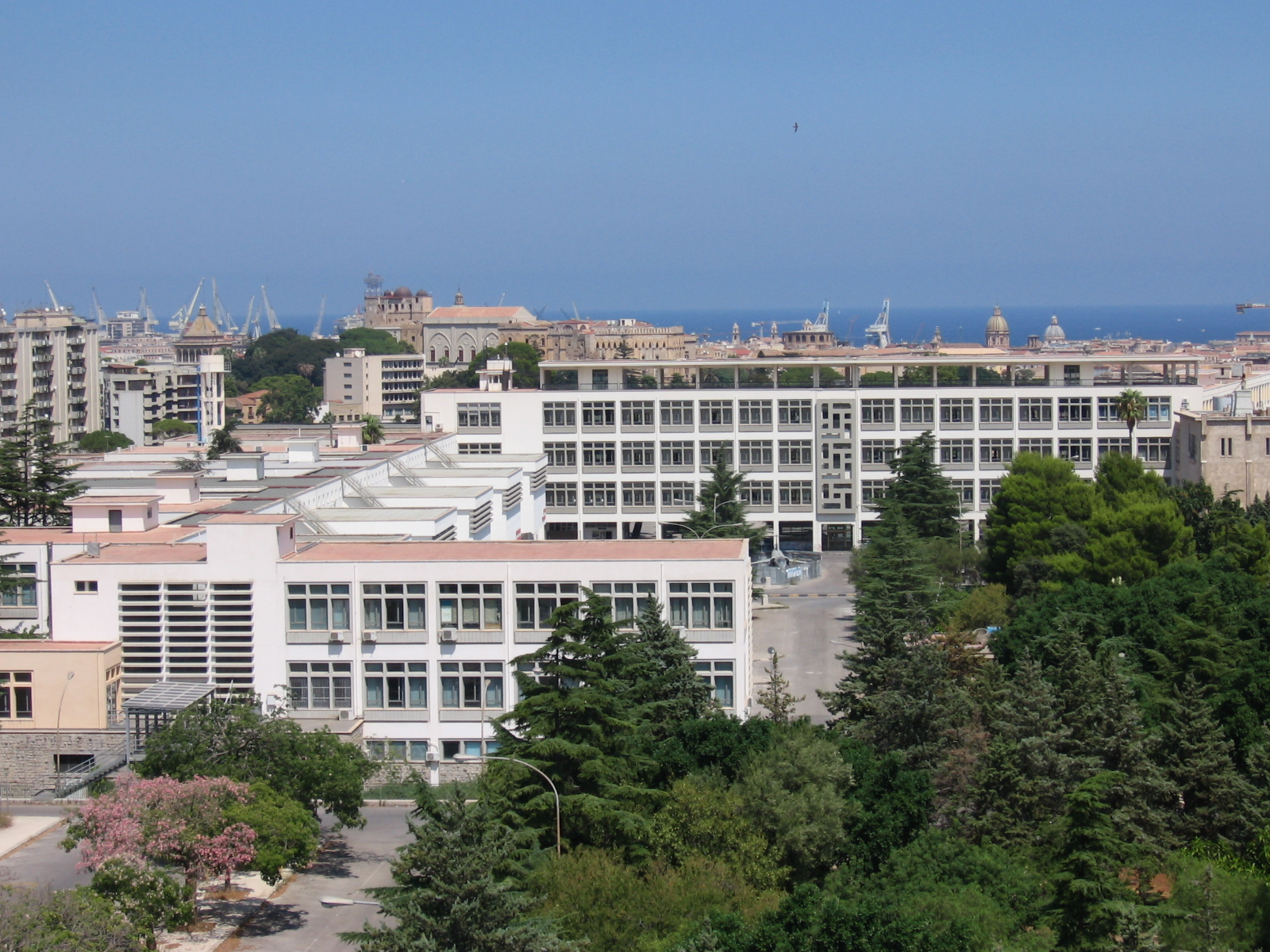
Faculty of Engineering, University of Palermo

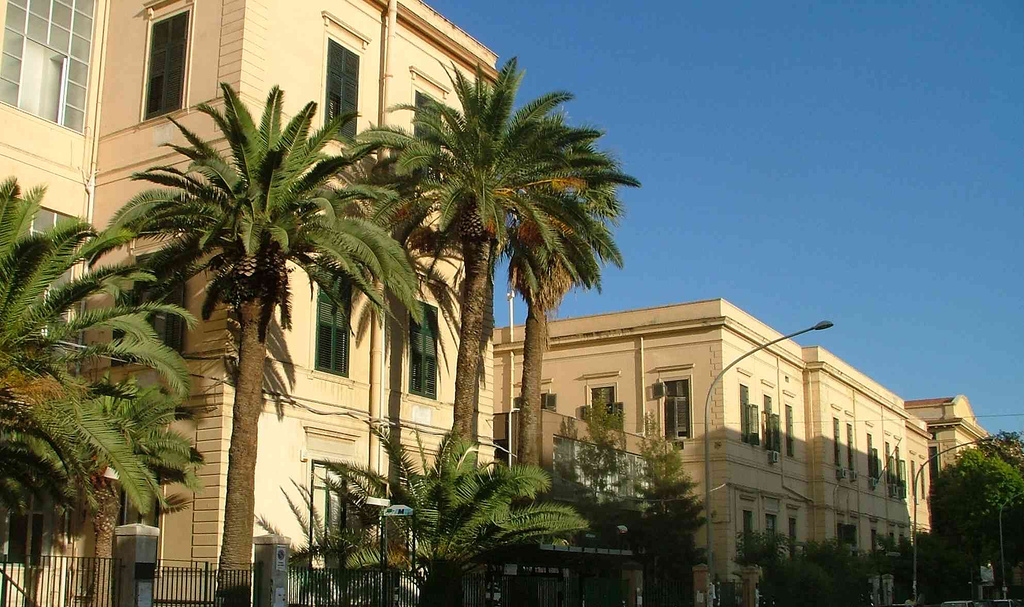
Faculty of Science, University of Palermo

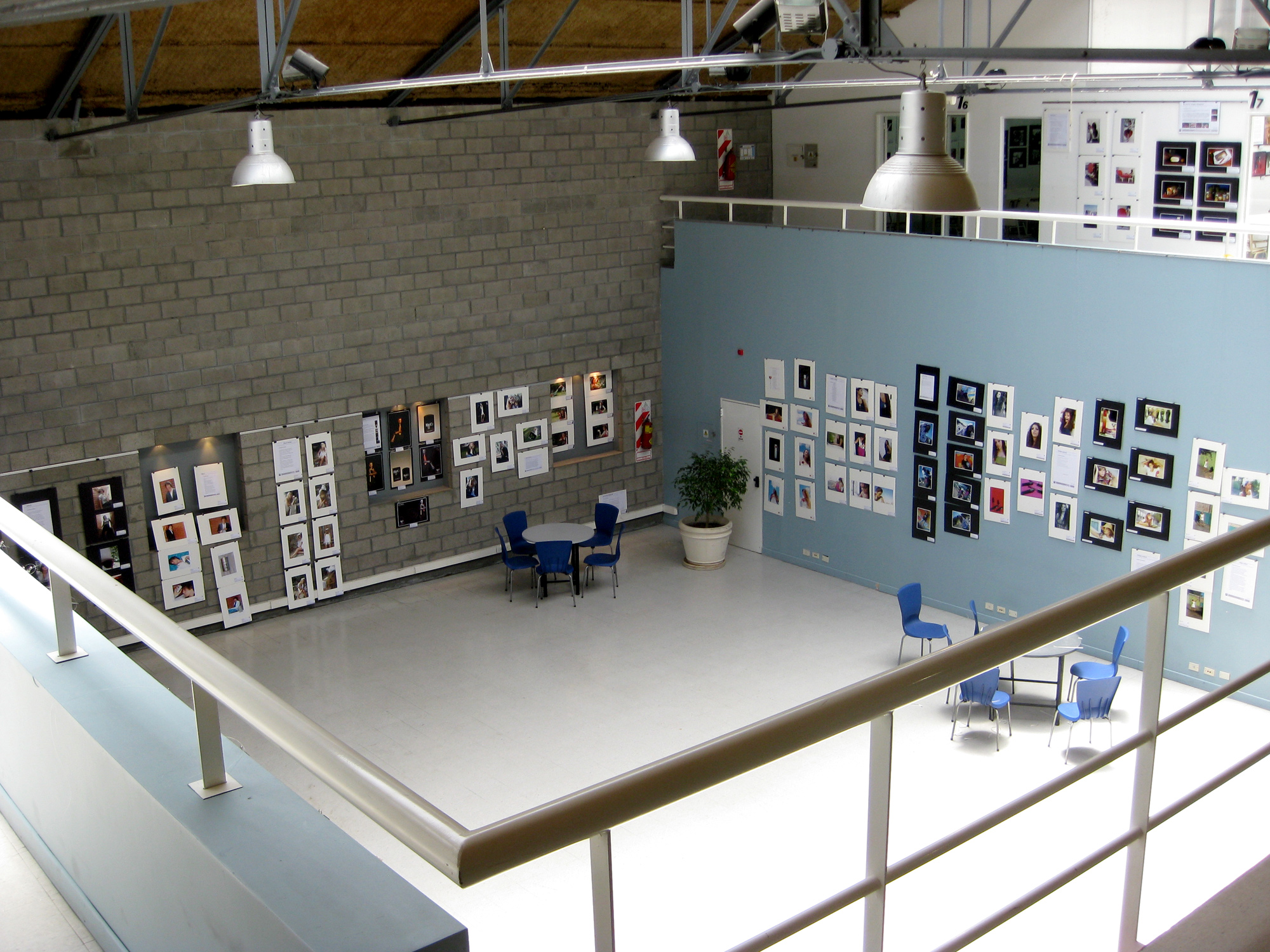
Inside the University of Palermo's Art and Architecture building

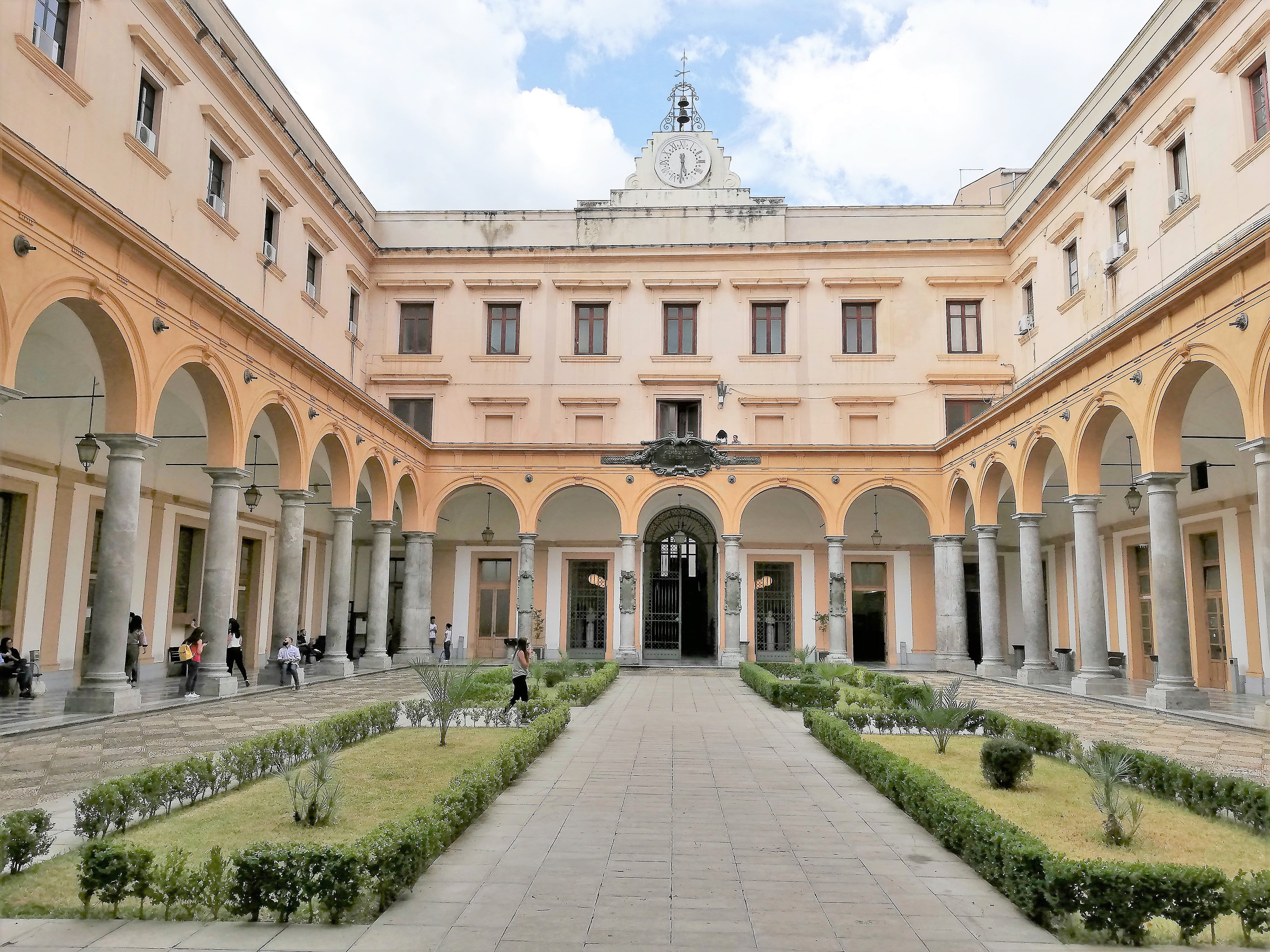
Faculty of Law, University of Palermo Casa dei Teatini, first location of the University of Palermo

These are the 12 faculties in which the university is divided into:

- Faculty of Agriculture
- Faculty of Architecture
- Faculty of Arts and Humanities
- Faculty of Economics
- Faculty of Education
- Faculty of Engineering
- Faculty of Law
- Faculty of Mathematical, Physical and Natural Sciences
- Faculty of Medicine
- Faculty of Physics
- Faculty of Pharmacy
- Faculty of Political Sciences

== Journal ==
University of Palermo has been publishing Mythos: Rivista di Storia delle Religioni, an annual peer-reviewed academic journal published by Giuseppe Sciascia Editore. It was established in 1989 by Giuseppe Martorana, with a new series started in 2007. It reviews religious narrative and mythos in Italian, French, English, German, and Spanish. The current editors-in-chief are Nicola Cusumano (University of Palermo) and Corinne Bonnet (University of Toulouse).

== Notable people ==
=== Alumni ===
- Giuseppe Alessi
- Giuseppe Ayala
- Ernesto Basile
- Giovanni Battista Filippo Basile
- Giulia Bongiorno
- Paolo Borsellino
- Gesualdo Bufalino
- Diego Cammarata
- Bruno Caruso
- Rocco Chinnici
- Francesco Crispi
- Salvatore Cuffaro
- Giovanni Falcone
- Mario Fasino
- Paolo Giaccone
- Giovanni Gioia
- Pietro Grasso
- Enrico La Loggia
- Giuseppe La Loggia
- Pio La Torre
- Salvatore Lauricella
- Rosario Livatino
- Filippo Mancuso
- Calogero Mannino
- Bernardo Mattarella
- Francesca Morvillo
- Gaetano Mosca
- Francesco Musotto
- Leoluca Orlando
- Vittorio Emanuele Orlando
- Ettore Paratore
- Emanuele Paternò
- Mino Pecorelli
- Giovanni Pitruzzella
- Valentino Picone
- Elda Pucci
- Franco Restivo
- Antonino Saetta
- Amedeo di Savoia
- Pietro Scaglione
- Renato Schifani
- Enzo Sellerio
- Antonio Starabba di Rudinì
- Carlo Vizzini
- Antonino Zichichi

=== Notable professors ===
- Stanislao Cannizzaro, famous for the Cannizzaro reaction and for his influential role in the atomic-weight deliberations of the Karlsruhe Congress in 1860.
- Pepi Fabbiano, astrophysicist
- Gaetano Giorgio Gemmellaro
- Sergio Mattarella, President of Italy
- Giuseppe Piazzi, his most famous discovery was the first dwarf planet, Ceres.
- Antonino Salinas
- Natalino Sapegno, He came to prominence as a leading scholar of fourteenth century Italian literature.
- Gioacchino Scaduto
- Emilio Segrè, awarded the Nobel Prize in Physics in 1959
- Angelo Torricelli, architecture professor

== See also ==
- List of early modern universities in Europe
- List of Italian universities
- Palermo
- Orto botanico di Palermo
- Center for Sicilian Philological and Linguistic Studies
