= 1963 Sicilian regional election =

The 1963 Sicilian regional election took place on 9 June 1963.

Christian Democracy was by far the largest party, largely ahead of the Italian Communist Party. After the election Giuseppe D'Angelo, the incumbent Christian Democratic President, formed a new government that included the Italian Socialist Party, the Italian Liberal Party, the Italian Democratic Socialist Party and the Italian Republican Party. In 1966 the Liberals left the government and Francesco Coniglio replaced D'Angelo as President of the Region.

== Results ==
| Parties | votes | (%) | seats |
|---|---|---|---|
| Christian Democracy | 979,439 | 42.1 | 37 |
| Italian Communist Party | 561,795 | 24.1 | 22 |
| Italian Socialist Party | 231,038 | 9.9 | 11 |
| Italian Liberal Party | 181,469 | 7.8 | 6 |
| Italian Social Movement | 168,850 | 7.2 | 7 |
| Italian Democratic Socialist Party | 90,845 | 3.9 | 3 |
| Italian Republican Party | 35,274 | 1.5 | 2 |
| Italian Democratic Party of Monarchist Unity | 32,731 | 1.4 | 2 |
| Social Christian Sicilian Union | 17,569 | 0.8 | - |
| Others | 30,090 | 1.3 | - |
| Total | 2,329,100 | 100.0 | 90 |

Sources: Istituto Cattaneo and Sicilian Regional Assembly
