= 1996 Sicilian regional election =

The 1996 Sicilian regional election was held on 16 June 1996.

The Sicilian Regional Assembly ended up very fragmented after the election and it was difficult to form a stable governing coalition. Between 1996 and 2001 the Region was thus governed by a succession of short-lived governments.

== Results ==
Parties	Votes	%	Seats
Forza Italia	456,125	17.1	17
National Alliance	376,122	14.1	14
Democratic Party of the Left	375,293	14.1	12
Christian Democratic Centre	261,830	9.8	11
United Christian Democrats	245,351	9.2	7
Italian People's Party	198,392	7.4	6
Communist Refoundation Party	115,138	4.3	6
Italian Renewal	101,947	3.8	3
The Network	94,818	3.6	3
Socialist Party	50,369	1.9	3
We Sicilians – Sicilian National Front	46,606	1.7	1
Tricolour Flame	31,606	1.2	–
Social Christians	30,276	1.1	–
Federation of the Greens	26,079	1.0	–
Reform and Freedom	23,967	0.9	1
The Ear List	21,966	0.8	1
Democratic Alliance	17,608	0.7	1
The Network–Greens	16,347	0.6	1
Dini List–PPI	16,119	0.6	–
Communist Refoundation–Greens	14,017	0.5	–
Reformists	13.332	0,5	1
Popular Democratic Movement	13,332	0.4	1
Liberals–PRI	11,963	0.4	–
Movement of Unitarian Communists	6,070	0.2	–
Social Democracy	5,833	0.2	–
Others	92,475	3.6	–
Total	2,667,582	100.0	90
Source: Results
