= Giuseppe La Loggia =

Italian politician (1911–1994)

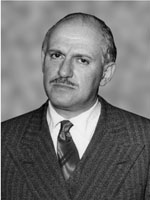
Giuseppe La Loggia

Giuseppe La Loggia (1 May 1911 – 2 March 1994) was an Italian politician.

== Biography ==
Giuseppe La Loggia was lawyer and university professor of labor law at the University of Palermo. Son of Enrico La Loggia, Undersecretary of Finance in 1921, one of the proponents of the Sicilian Statute, and father of the former minister Enrico La Loggia.

He was elected deputy to the Sicilian Regional Assembly among the ranks of the Christian Democracy in 1947, and remained so until 1967. He immediately became Assessor for agriculture and forests in the first and second Alessi governments (from 30 May 1947 to 8 March 1948 and from 9 March 1948 to 11 January 1949) and later Assessor for finance in the first and second Restivo governments (from 12 January 1949 until the end of the legislature and from 20 July 1951 until the end of the legislature). From 1955 to 1956 he held the role of President of the ARS.

In 1956 he was elected President of the Sicilian Region. In October 1958, Giuseppe La Loggia, whose political action was supported by DC secretary Amintore Fanfani, was vehemently attacked by many of his party companions and was forced to resign as president of the region. Silvio Millazzo was elected President at his post, in whose government there were representatives of both the Italian Communist Party and the Italian Social Movement. This event took the name "Milazzo operation", from which the neologism "Millazzismo" also derived.

Subsequently, La Loggia was regional Assessor for tourism from 1963 to 1964, mayor of Cattolica Eraclea from 1962 to 1965 and also the first president of ESPI, the Sicilian body for industrial promotion, a position he held from 1967 to 1968.

In 1968 he was elected to the Chamber of Deputies, where he kept his seat until 1983. He was then appointed judge to the Council of State and, subsequently, President of the State polygraphic institute. He died in Rome on 2 March 1994.

== Bibliography ==
- AAVV L'attività parlamentare di Giuseppe La Loggia, Palermo, 2004, 2 voll. (Introduzione di Guido Lo Porto), Quaderni ARS
