= 1967 Sicilian regional election =

The 1967 Sicilian regional election took place on 11 June 1967.

Christian Democracy was by far the largest party, largely ahead of the Italian Communist Party. During the legislature the Christian Democrats governed the Region in coalition with some centre-left parties: the Italian Socialist Party, the Italian Democratic Socialist Party and the Italian Republican Party.

== Results ==
Parties	votes	(%)	seats
Christian Democracy	934,632	40.1	35
Italian Communist Party	515,643	22.1	21
Italian Socialist Party–Italian Democratic Socialist Party	318,644	13.7	12
Italian Social Movement	152,742	6.6	8
Italian Liberal Party	143,068	6.1	4
Italian Republican Party	105,180	4.5	4
Italian Socialist Party of Proletarian Unity	97,949	4.2	4
Italian Democratic Party of Monarchist Unity	45,045	1.9	2
Others	53,947	2.0	-
Total	2,329,320	100.0	90

Sources: Istituto Cattaneo and Sicilian Regional Assembly
