= 1976 Sicilian regional election =

The 1976 Sicilian regional election took place on 20 June 1976.

Christian Democracy was by far the largest party, largely ahead of the Italian Communist Party. During the legislature the Christian Democrats governed the Region in coalition with some centre-left parties: the Italian Socialist Party, the Italian Democratic Socialist Party and the Italian Republican Party.

== Results ==
Parties	votes	votes (%)	seats
Christian Democracy	1,153,002	40.9	39
Italian Communist Party	757,120	26.8	24
Italian Social Movement	306,702	10.9	9
Italian Socialist Party	289,539	10.3	10
Italian Democratic Socialist Party	97,279	3.4	2
Italian Republican Party	92,062	3.3	4
Italian Liberal Party	59,835	2.1	2
Others	67,359	2.3	-
Total	2,822,898	100.0	90

Sources: Istituto Cattaneo and Sicilian Regional Assembly
