= 1971 Sicilian regional election =

The 1971 Sicilian regional election took place on 13 June 1971.

Christian Democracy was by far the largest party, largely ahead of the Italian Social Movement that came second. During the legislature the Christian Democrats governed the Region in coalition with some centre-left parties: the Italian Socialist Party, the Italian Democratic Socialist Party and the Italian Republican Party.

== Results ==
Parties	votes	votes (%)	seats
Christian Democracy	794,414	33.3	29
Italian Social Movement	389,512	16.3	15
Italian Communist Party	299,547	12.5	14
Italian Socialist Party	269,515	11.4	11
Italian Socialist Party of Proletarian Unity	235,770	9.9	10
Italian Democratic Socialist Party	135,118	5.7	5
Italian Republican Party	110,238	4.6	3
Italian Liberal Party	88,083	3.7	3
Italian Democratic Party of Monarchist Unity	28,746	1.2	-
Others	33,432	1.4	-
Total	2,384,343	100.0	90

Sources: Istituto Cattaneo and Sicilian Regional Assembly
