= 1991 Sicilian regional election =

The 1991 Sicilian regional election was held on 16 June 1991.

Christian Democracy resulted by far the largest party, while the Italian Socialist Party came second. These two parties continued to govern the Region at the head of different coalitions which comprised in different times the Democratic Party of the Left, the Italian Democratic Socialist Party, the Italian Republican Party and the Italian Liberal Party.

== Results ==
| Parties | votes | votes (%) | seats |
|---|---|---|---|
| Christian Democracy | 1,228,002 | 42.4 | 39 |
| Italian Socialist Party | 450,294 | 15.6 | 15 |
| Democratic Party of the Left | 330,873 | 10.5 | 13 |
| The Network | 211,423 | 7.4 | 5 |
| Italian Democratic Socialist Party | 152,306 | 5.4 | 6 |
| Italian Social Movement | 138,732 | 4.9 | 5 |
| Italian Republican Party | 104,912 | 3.7 | 3 |
| Communist Refoundation Party | 91,826 | 3.3 | 1 |
| Italian Liberal Party | 79,562 | 2.8 | 2 |
| Federation of the Greens | 27,319 | 0.9 | – |
| Republican Movement | 18,905 | 0.7 | 1 |
| Sicilian Popular Union | 16.562 | 0.6 | – |
| Others | 49,302 | 1.8 | – |
| Total | 2,900,018 | 100.0 | 90 |

Sources: Istituto Cattaneo and Sicilian Regional Assembly
