= Franco Restivo =

Italian politician (1911–1976)

Minister of the Interior
- In office 24 June 1968 – 17 February 1972
- Prime Minister: Giovanni Leone; Mariano Rumor; Emilio Colombo
- Preceded by: Paolo Emilio Taviani
- Succeeded by: Mariano Rumor

Minister of Defence
- In office 17 February 1972 – 26 June 1972
- Prime Minister: Giulio Andreotti
- Preceded by: Mario Tanassi
- Succeeded by: Mario Tanassi

Minister of Agriculture and Forests
- In office 23 February 1966 – 24 June 1968
- Prime Minister: Aldo Moro
- Preceded by: Mario Ferrari Aggradi
- Succeeded by: Giacomo Sedati

Member of the Chamber of Deputies
- In office 12 June 1958 – 17 April 1976
- Constituency: Palermo

President of Sicily
- In office 14 June 1949 – 4 June 1955
- Preceded by: Giuseppe Alessi
- Succeeded by: Giuseppe Alessi

Member of the Constituent Assembly
- In office 25 June 1946 – 13 November 1947
- Constituency: Palermo

Personal details
- Born: 25 May 1911 Palermo, Sicily, Italy
- Died: 17 April 1976 (aged 64) Francavilla di Sicilia, Sicily, Italy
- Party: DC
- Education: University of Palermo
- Profession: Politician, University professor

Franco Restivo (25 May 1911 – 17 April 1976) was an Italian politician.

== Biography ==
Franco Restivo was son of Empedocle Restivo, a jurist and national deputy. He studied law at the University of Palermo and in 1943 he became a professor of constitutional law at the Faculty of Law of the Sicilian university; later teaching public law at the Faculty of economics and commerce of the same university.

He was member of the Constituent Assembly between 1946 and 1947, of the Sicilian Regional Assembly between 1947 and 1958, and a national Deputy from 1958 until his death.

Between 1949 and 1955 he served as President of the Sicilian Region. After his return to national politics, he also served as a Minister of Agriculture (Moro III Cabinet), as Minister of the Interior (Leone II Cabinet, Rumor I Cabinet, Rumor II Cabinet, Rumor III Cabinet and Colombo Cabinet), and as Minister of Defence (Andreotti I Cabinet).

During the period in which he held the dicastery of the Interior, Restivo faced a situation of serious deterioration of public order, the massacre of Piazza Fontana, worsening of common and mafia crime, youth protestsand political terrorism.

== Death ==
Franco Restivo died 17 April 1976, a few months before the end of the VI Legislature.

== In popular culture ==
Restivo is portrayed by Fabrizio Bentivoglio in the 2020 film Rose Island.

== Honors and awards ==
- Chancellor and Treasurer of the Military Order of Italy (17 February 1972 – 26 June 1972)
- Grand Cross of Merit with German Order of Merit Plaque (1957)
