= 1981 Sicilian regional election =

The 1981 Sicilian regional election took place on 21 June 1981.

Christian Democracy was by far the largest party, largely ahead of the Italian Communist Party. During the legislature the Christian Democrats governed the Region in coalition with the Italian Socialist Party, the Italian Republican Party, the Italian Democratic Socialist Party and the Italian Liberal Party (Pentapartito).

== Results ==
Parties	votes	votes (%)	seats
Christian Democracy	1,109,004	41.4	38
Italian Communist Party	552,399	20.7	20
Italian Socialist Party	383,902	14.3	14
Italian Social Movement	228,166	8.5	6
Italian Republican Party	117,391	4.4	5
Italian Democratic Socialist Party	80,102	3.0	2
PRI–PSDI–PLI	77,154	2.9	1
Italian Liberal Party	61,064	2.3	3+1
Proletarian Democracy	25,703	1.0	-
Others	45,043	1.6	-
Total	2,676,493	100.0	90

Sources: Istituto Cattaneo and Sicilian Regional Assembly
