= 1986 Sicilian regional election =

The 1986 Sicilian regional election took place on 22 June 1986.

Christian Democracy was by far the largest party, largely ahead of the Italian Communist Party. Christian Democrat Rino Nicolosi was President of the Region for the whole legislature, albeit at the head of different coalitions, that included the Italian Socialist Party for most of the time.

== Results ==
Parties	votes	votes (%)	seats
Christian Democracy	1,109,570	38.8	36
Italian Communist Party	553,629	19.3	19
Italian Socialist Party	429,660	15.0	14
Italian Social Movement	262,279	9.2	8
Italian Republican Party	145,408	5.1	5
Italian Democratic Socialist Party	122,495	4.3	4
Italian Liberal Party	80,241	2.8	3
Proletarian Democracy	36,260	1.3	1
PRI–PSDI–PLI	21,232	0.7	-
Others	96,187	3.3	-
Total	2,856,961	100.0	90

Sources: Istituto Cattaneo and Sicilian Regional Assembly
