= Giuseppe Alessi =

Italian politician (1905–2009)

1st and 3rd President of Sicily
- In office 30 May 1947 – 13 June 1949
- Preceded by: Office created (Giovanni Selvaggi as High Commissary)
- Succeeded by: Franco Restivo
- In office 5 June 1955 – 4 April 1956
- Preceded by: Franco Restivo
- Succeeded by: Giuseppe La Loggia

Member of the Chamber
- In office 27 May 1968 – 24 May 1972
- Constituency: Palermo

Member of the Senate
- In office 17 May 1963 – 4 June 1968
- Constituency: Piazza Armerina

Personal details
- Born: 29 October 1905 San Cataldo, Sicily, Kingdom of Italy
- Died: 13 July 2009 (aged 103) Palermo, Sicily, Italy
- Party: Italian People's Party (1921–1926); Christian Democracy (1943–1994); Rebirth of Christian Democracy (1997–2002); Christian Democracy (2002–2009)
- Education: University of Palermo
- Profession: Lawyer, politician

Giuseppe Alessi (29 October 1905 – 13 July 2009) was an Italian politician. From 1968 to 1973 he was a member of the Chamber of Deputies, and from 1963 to 1968 a member of the Senate. From 1947 to 1949 he was also President of Sicily.

== Biography ==
Alessi was born in San Cataldo, Caltanissetta, Sicily. He was one of the founding members of the Christian Democratic (Democrazia Cristiana) party on the island and became the first elected President of the Regional Government of Sicily. He was a member of the reform wing of the DC. From 1968-73, he was a member of the Italian Chamber of Deputies.

Journalist Alexander Stille interviewed Alessi in the 1990s and asked him about the relations between the Christian Democrats and the Mafia: "It happened this way. Some people in the Christian Democratic Party approached the separatists, whose backbone were these Mafia bosses and invited them to join the national parties ... [T]he Mafiosi were looking for the road to power, to secure the support they needed for their economic affairs. If the mayor was Republican, they became Republican, if he was Socialist, they were Socialist, if he was Christian Democrat they became Christian Democrat." Alessi defended them as a necessary evil of the Cold War period: "The Christian Democrats subordinated their ideals for a supreme interest of national importance: saving the democratic state. The victory of Communism would have meant Italy ended up behind the Iron Curtain."

== Political views ==
Alessi's justification of his party's dealings with the Mafia is based on a romantic view of the Mafia of the 1940s and 1950s: "They weren't criminals, they were local potentates, neighbourhood bosses, proud men of prestige. Their crimes were basically economic - fraud, forgery, illegal appropriation of property - but they disliked real crime."

== Death ==
Alessi died in Palermo, aged 103, on 13 July 2009.

== Honour ==
- Italy: Knight Grand Cross of the Order of Merit of the Italian Republic (10 may 1974)
