= Cateno De Luca =

Italian politician (born 1972)

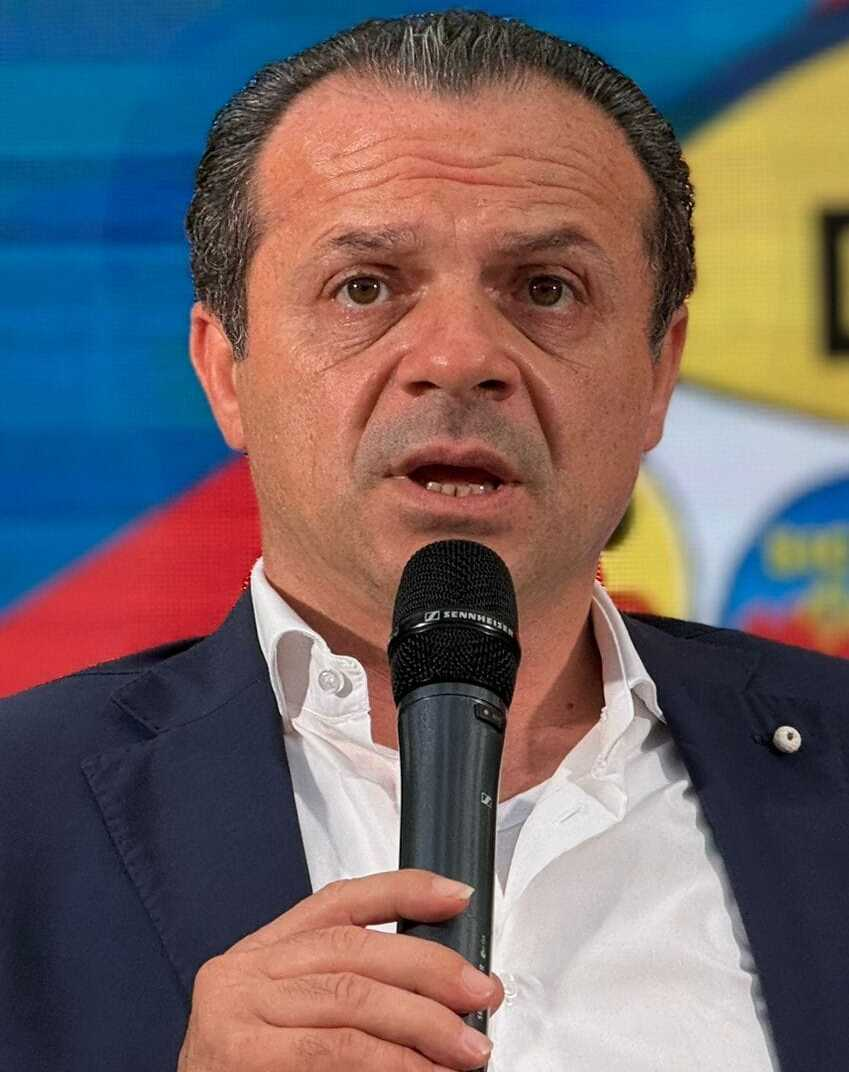

Mayor of Taormina
- Incumbent
- Assumed office 29 May 2023
- Preceded by: Mario Bolognari

Leader of South calls North
- Incumbent
- Assumed office 27 June 2022
- Preceded by: Office established

Mayor of Messina
- In office 26 June 2018 – 14 February 2022
- Preceded by: Renato Accorinti
- Succeeded by: Federico Basile

Mayor of the Metropolitan City of Messina
- In office 26 June 2018 – 14 February 2022
- Preceded by: Renato Accorinti
- Succeeded by: Federico Basile

Mayor of Santa Teresa di Riva
- In office 9 May 2012 – 12 June 2017
- Preceded by: Alberto Morabito
- Succeeded by: Danilo Lo Giudice

Mayor of Fiumedinisi
- In office 27 May 2003 – 1 July 2011
- Preceded by: Gino Totaro
- Succeeded by: Alessandro Rasconà

Personal details
- Born: Cateno Roberto Salvatore De Luca; 18 March 1972 (age 54) Fiumedinisi, Italy
- Party: ScN (since 2022)
- Other political affiliations: DC (1986–1994); CCD (1994–2002); UdC (2002–2005); MpA (2005–2007, 2008–2010); SV (since 2007); Freedom (since 2024)
- Spouse: Giusy Gregorio
- Children: 2
- Education: University of Messina
- Occupation: Politician, manager

Cateno Roberto Salvatore De Luca (born 18 March 1972) is an Italian politician who served as the mayor of Messina from 2018 to 2022 and is the incumbent mayor of Taormina since 2023. He was also the mayor of Fiumedinisi, his hometown, from 2003 to 2011 and of Santa Teresa di Riva from 2012 to 2017.

De Luca began his career at the age of 18 in Christian Democracy (DC), the ruling party of post-war Italy. He often changed political parties, and switched between the DC's successors and other Christian-democratic parties, such as the Christian Democratic Centre (CCD) and the Union of the Centre (UdC), and regionalist ones, such as the Movement for Autonomy (MpA) and True Sicily (VS), which he founded as a split from the MpA in 2007. He also switched political alliances, at times allying with the centre-right coalition and at other times supporting the centre-left coalition or neither of the two largest blocs.

In 2022, De Luca founded his own national political party, South calls North (ScN), and was able to elect a deputy and senator to the Italian Parliament. He was a candidate for president of Sicily in 2012 and was the distant runner-up in 2022; that same year, he led ScN to become the largest party in Messina and the third-most voted party in Sicily. Due to his overbearing personality, De Luca is often nicknamed Scateno (English: Unleash) by the national and local press.

== Early life and education ==
De Luca was born in Fiumedinisi, in the province of Messina, the third son of a peasant and mason family. As a teenager, De Luca raised rabbits and collected oregano, walnuts, and chestnuts and then sold them to the farmers of his hometown under the control of his mother. During the summer when in middle school, he worked as a bricklayer with his father. When in high school, De Luca worked in the bars of Fiumedinisi and in the winter attended a law firm in Messina that dealt with labour law and social security. He opened the first patronage office in Fiumedinisi at 18 and inaugurated the first office of the National Autonomous Federation of Small Entrepreneurs (FENAPI) in Messina at 22. De Luca said that he bought his first car, a 1200-injected Opel Corsa, from a car showroom in Messina with his own savings at the age of 18. He graduated in law at the University of Messina.

== Political career ==
=== Mayor of Fiumedinisi and Santa Teresa di Riva ===
De Luca's interest in Italian politics came from an early age; when he was 14, De Luca joined the youth section of Christian Democracy (DC), the ruling party of the First Italian Republic, and shared manifestoes for the DC in his hometown. He began his official political career at the age of 18, when he was elected to the city council of his city, the youngest to do so. At the age of 22, he was appointed assessor to his own municipality. Within first the DC and then the Christian Democratic Centre (CCD) of Pier Ferdinando Casini, he was politically trained under the wing of Salvatore D'Alia, a leading exponent of the DC/CCD in Sicily.

After losing the 1998 Fiumedinisi municipal election, De Luca ran again for mayor in 2003, and this time he was successful. He was re-elected in 2008, and resigned as mayor of Fiumedinisi in 2011. In May 2012, De Luca ran for the office of mayor of Santa Teresa di Riva, winning in the first round with 51% of the votes; he resigned from the Sicilian Regional Assembly (ARS) in July 2012 in order to "start my revolution in Sicily", enjoying the support of FENAPI, and remained in office until June 2017. As he was not able to run for re-election in Fiumedinisi, De Luca supported two candidates, Alessandro Rasconà and Francesco Sentineri. Both candidates were supported by two electoral lists tied to De Luca, De Luca True Sicily and Fiumedinisi in the True Heart of Sicily, and Rasconà was elected with 63.42% of the votes. De Luca said: "True Sicily will present by the end of June [2012] the political and economic program based on clear autonomist and separatist choices."

=== Member of the Sicilian Regional Assembly ===
At the 2006 Sicilian regional election, De Luca was elected deputy to the ARS with the Movement for the Autonomies (MpA) of Raffaele Lombardo, with whom he would later come to have conflictual relations; he was re-elected with the MpA at the 2008 Sicilian regional election. As part of a split from the MpA, of which he was the vice-secretary, De Luca founded True Sicily (VS), a political-cultural association that later became a regional political party, in March 2007. In February 2008, he returned to the MpA and sat among its members in the ARS until 2010, when he became the group leader in the ARS of Force of the South (FdS), which was founded by Gianfranco Miccichè. During his time at the ARS, De Luca stood out due to his lashes at the majority deputies, painting them with catchphrases and insults; he told Francesco Cascio of Forza Italia (FI) that he was "a baronet, a regime politician who squanders public money", called Salvino Caputo of The People of Freedom (PdL) "a street charlatan", and told to Micchichè, the then ARS president, that he had "legalized the absences of deputies" and to the then Sicily president Salvatore Cuffaro: "I have no respect for you." Among his slogans during his career at the ARS were "I Am a Free Hitter" and "Let's Demolish the Sicilian Region".

From 21 June 2011 to 19 July 2011, De Luca was suspended from the position of regional deputy because he was placed under house arrest. The prosecutor, who had asked for a sentence of five years, argued that, from 2004 to 2010, De Luca allegedly used public funds intended for the construction of containment works for a stream at risk of flooding to build a hotel in Fiumedinisi; meanwhile, De Luca and his lawyer, Carlo Taormina, had unsuccessfully argued for the trial venue to be moved from Messina to Reggio Calabria. In November 2017, De Luca was acquitted of the charges of abuse of office and forgery, while the attempted extortion was time-barred; he felt vindicated by the acquittal, especially because he had been placed in the list of not-presentable centre-right coalition candidates by the Antimafia Commission, including by the Five Star Movement (M5S) presidential candidate Giancarlo Cancellieri, after his arrest. In December 2018, De Luca was definitively convicted in the accounting justice system but acquitted in the penal system, after Italy's Supreme Court of Cassation rejected his appeal, as part of the inqury about the expenses of the ARS. In April 2017, he had already been sentenced by the Court of Counts to pay a fine of €13,000, which he did, expecting that his appeal to the Supreme Court of Cassation would be rejected.

In December 2011, when he returned to the ARS six months, De Luca attacked the prosecutor who investigated him and made complaints against the Messina prosecutor's office. At the 2012 Sicilian regional election, De Luca was a candidate for president of Sicily and was supported by the Sicilian Revolution list; as he garnered 1.23% of the votes, De Luca was not re-elected to the ARS due to the 5% election threshold, and was listed among the candidates that did not reach the threshold. He had called for the elimination of political discontent, the reduction of 50% of the costs of politics and bureaucracy, and the streamlining of the regional bureaucratic structure; despite his 2011 arrest, De Luca's 2012 electoral campaign had opened with a Silvio Berlusconi-style convention at the Politeama Theatre in Palermo, and the walls of Sicilian cities were plastered with his 3x6s electoral manifestoes with slogans referencing his Scateno nickname like "I Revolutionize Sicily. I Unleash De Luca". De Luca also criticized the ARS and comuni. He promised to "kick the ass of the idlers and professional sick people" of the Messina municipality. In support of the centre-right coalition candidate and eventual winner Nello Musumeci, De Luca's True Sicily made an agreement with the Union of the Centre (UdC) for the 2017 Sicilian regional election, in which he was re-elected as a member of the ARS among the ranks of the UdC after garnering 5,418 preferential votes; he left the UdC group and joined the Mixed Group in the ARS on 20 December 2017.

On 7 November 2017, De Luca apologized to his electors for not thanking them one by one, and wrote to his supporters: "They will acquit me in this too, I am a specialist in acquittals." He wrote on Facebook: "I will try to thank all of you one by one for the result we have achieved. For now I am not answering anyone either on the phone or by message because I am concentrated with my lawyers as on 9 November I have the last hearing of the last trial which concerns my judicial ordeal which has lasted since 27 June 2011 with 14 criminal proceedings already closed in my favour. I apologize." On 8 November 2017, after being acquitted from the 2011 charges, De Luca was charged for tax evasion (€1,750,000), and was again placed under house arrest; this was subsequently revoked and replaced by an interdictive measure of the prohibition to hold top positions in the bodies involved in the investigation. To his supporters, De Luca spoke of a conspiracy against him, stating: "They are afraid that I will become mayor of Messina, as I publicly announced I wanted to be last January [2017], and so they found a way to stop me." In 2022, De Luca was acquitted of the tax evasion charge in both the first-instance trial and on appeal.

=== Mayor of Messina ===
In April 2017, De Luca announced his candidacy for mayor of Messina, with the support of six centrist civic lists. In the 2018 Italian local elections, De Luca was elected mayor of Messina. In the first round, he came second with 19.81%. Although none of the lists that supported him received any seats, he won the election runoff on 24 June 2018 with 65.28% of the votes, beating the centre-right coalition candidate Dino Bramanti. He also automatically became mayor of the Metropolitan City of Messina, which was established after the introduction of the metropolitan cities of Italy by the Renzi government in 2015. In October 2018, De Luca resigned as regional deputy to maintain the position of mayor of Messina; it was the third time that he did not finish the regional legislature. His seat was assigned on the same day to Danilo Lo Giudice, mayor of Santa Teresa di Riva and second of those elected on the UdC list in the Messina constituency, who had joined the Mixed Group in the ARS and De Luca's True Sicily.

For the 2019 European Parliament election in Italy, De Luca made an agreement with Silvio Berlusconi and Gianfranco Miccichè, the regional coordinator of Berlusconi's Forza Italia (FI) party in Sicily, to have Dafne Musolino as candidate for the European Parliament among the FI lists in the Italian Islands constituency. In addition to guaranteeing a candidate for De Luca's True Sicily, the pact was based on a shared program for the city of Messina to be brought to the European Parliament. With 47,187 preferences, Musolino was the second-most voted candidate not to be elected. De Luca remained the mayor of Messina until his resignation in 2022 to run for president of Sicily. In October 2021, on the occasion of the Sicilia Vera assembly, De Luca had announced that he would run for president of the Sicilian region, challenging the outgoing centre-right coalition president Nello Musumeci. On 25 January 2022, he resigned as mayor of Messina; his resignation became effective on 14 February 2022. He rejected Miccichè's proposal to be the centre-right coalition candidate to run autonomously. At the 2022 Italian local elections, he supported the True Sicily candidate Federico Basile, who was elected in the first round as mayor of Messina, and was elected municipal councilor. On 13 July 2022, he was elected president of Messina's municipal council with 23 votes out of 32.

=== Return to the Sicilian Regional Assembly and mayor of Taormina ===
On 27 June 2022, De Luca founded the South calls North (ScN) to support his candidacy for the presidency of Sicily. In the subsequent consultations, he took the role of coordinator, while Dino Giarrusso, a member of the European Parliament (MEP) and former Five Star Movement (M5S) who was working on a Meridionalist political project, with whom he had developed an agreement a few days earlier but that ended in August 2022, became ScN's secretary. The former Le Iene journalist Ismaele La Vardera also joined ScN in the role of federal president of the party and spokesperson in De Luca's electoral campaign for the 2022 Sicilian regional election, where De Luca came second, with 23.95% of the vote, behind the centre-right coalition candidate Renato Schifani; he was the presidential candidate of True Sicily (VS). ScN, his newly founded political party, was the third-most voted party, just behind the M5S and ahead of the Democratic Party (PD), and he was re-elected as a member of the ARS, alongside seven others ScN members. He sat at the opposition. During the 2022 Italian general election, which was held on the same day, he unsuccessfully ran, as part of VS and ScN, for the Senate of the Republic in the single-member district of the Sicily 4 (Catania) constituency; he said that his party would not be "the taxi to give the possibility of recycling and being the Pharisees of politics", and came third with 14.44% of the votes, while the centre-right coalition Nello Musumeci was elected with 36.4% of the votes. Despite this, De Luca's party elected two members of the Italian Parliament in the single-member districts (Francesco Gallo in the Chamber of Deputies and Dafne Musolino in the Senate of the Republic. De Luca's party was the largest in Messina.

In January 2023, De Luca announced his candidacy for mayor of Taormina; he was supported by the former deputy Carmelo Lo Monte, who had joined ScN, and was elected mayor with 63.49% of the votes, defeating the outgoing mayor of the centre-left coalition Mario Bolognari, a member of the PD who was also supported by some from the centre-right coalition, such as FI and Lega. In August 2023, De Luca he announced his candidacy for the single-member constituency of Lombardy 6 (Monza) for the Senate of the Republic in the by-elections following the death of Silvio Berlusconi. He called himself more leghista than Umberto Bossi. Despite an optimistic prediction at the start of his campaign of a double digit result, De Luca garnered 2,313 preferences, which were equal to 1.76% of the votes, placing him third. In October 2023, De Luca's True Sicily party ceased to exist as a group in the ARS after Salvatore Geraci joined the League (Lega) and all other formed members had joined De Luca's ScN group. In December 2023, De Luca said that he was working on the campo largo, the journalistic definition for the opposition that had obtained a plurality of votes but was divided, with the PD and the M5S. In Aprili 2024, De Luca called for Schifani's resignation, and placed himself at the helm of a ScN–M5S–PD coalition for the next regional elections; he added that, if he were elected president of Sicily, the first person he would appoint as part of the regional government would be the M5S member Luigi Sunseri as the Assessor at the Economy.

=== Freedom list for the 2024 European Parliament election ===
Ahead of the 2024 European Parliament election in Italy, where he was exempt from the collection of signatures due to having elected to members of the Italian Parliament in 2022, De Luca attempted to form an electoral list starting in March 2023, as part of a project to bring together various exponents of the former Third Pole and the centrist, reformist, and liberal area to create a new political entity with the likes of Letizia Moratti, Clemente Mastella, and Roberto Castelli, then in August 2023 with Matteo Renzi, and in December 2023 with Carlo Calenda. When this failed, De Luca presented his own electoral list, Freedom, and announced his candidacy to the European Parliament in all of Italy's constituencies. His populist list attracted attention due to the record number of minor and heterogeneous parties (from agrarianists and farmers to environmentalists and supporters of animal rights, from pro-Europeanists to Eurosceptics, from pro-vaccines to vaccine sceptics, from supporters of greater autonomy for the regions of Italy, particularly in the North, to opponents like De Luca himself), as well as members of civic lists and former members of the M5S and Lega, which would be exempt from having to collect signatures at Italy's national elections if De Luca's list elects at least one MEP; De Luca described the collection of signatures for new parties as unjust and offered to help them. La Vardera, the ScN's group leader at the ARS, Sergio De Caprio, a former anti-Mafia Carabiniere who arrested Totò Riina and thus was subsequently forced to wear a mask, which he removed for the first time when he was announced as part of De Luca's list, and longstanding representatives of the Northern League (LN) like Castelli were among the announced candidates and supporters of De Luca's electoral list; De Luca called his list a union "to defend the rights of the South and North against bureaucratic Europe".

As of April 2024, among the many parties in De Luca's European Parliament list, which was first announced in March 2024 and became a subject of national attention due the number of its member parties and its logo, included De Luca's parties (South calls North and True Sicily), anti-establishment forces (Italexit's spliter party Movement for Italexit, Shared Horizons, Together Free, and Vita), regionalist parties and movements of former representatives of Lega (Great North, True North, Valdostan Rally, and Venetian People), the M5S, and the Pensioners Party (Pensioners' Party + Health), as well as various mayors (Civics in Movement), symbols of anti-Mafia like De Caprio (Captain Last) and Piera Aiello, and animal-rights activists (Rizzi), farmers and fishermen (Us Farmers & Fishers), street vendors (Us Free Vendors), environmentalists (Green Front and Sustainable Progress), Europeanists and moderates (Moderate Party of Italy), sovereignists (Sovereignty), and Catholics (The People of the Family). The main points of De Luca's list, which was called by its supporters the Freedom Front, are represented by the slogan "Less Europe, More Sovereignty, More Autonomy, More Italy". He compared his list to the Expedition of the Thousand of Giuseppe Garibaldi, and said that "we will become millions". De Luca further stated: "Each symbol is a star in the firmament of freedom. Each symbol represents a story and is the interpreter of a message and will have the possibility of bringing the demands of its territory and its history into the European Parliament. We have put together forces civic and political ones who want to give a push to this liberticidal Europe in a list not of purpose to overcome the barrier [of the electoral threshold], but with the common denominator [of] less Europe, more autonomy, more sovereignty, more equity."

== Political views ==
After being elected mayor of Messina in 2018, De Luca said: "I will be the bearer of that revolution that you wanted and this council will help me to make concrete actions that we have proposed within the programme. ... Loving Messina is not a slogan. This city must return to being an Agora, a place where we are together, and to do this we must break down the barriers of individualism and create community." He called for all political parties of the newly elected city council to work together but reiterated his opposition to the old politics way, saying: "I was elected as a transversal mayor, without any political colour, and I will remain so. ... I want a land where politics is not a tool for cultivating clientele and I will work so that the revolution christened the 24 June becomes a way of governing."

De Luca is critical of differentiated autonomy (autonomia differenziata), which is especially supported by Northern Italy and by right-wing parties that is criticized for increasing the gap between Northern and Southern Italy, as part of the Southern question. He also criticized the centre-left coalition, saying: "This differentiated autonomy is the result of a strategy of the centre-left [coalition] which in 2001 attempted in vain to pursue [Umberto] Bossi." In 2023, De Luca described the differentiated autonomy draft law proposal by the Meloni government and Roberto Calderoli, the Minister for Regional Affairs and Autonomies, as "a criminal law", and called it "a criminal plan carried out by a political force that no longer has anything to say, namely the League". De Luca is a supporter of his own Sicilian differentiated autonomy.

At the March 2023 national assembly of South calls North (ScN), De Luca said: "Anything but fear of differentiated autonomy, we want the Kingdom of the Two Sicilies. We are federalists and we aim to aggregate while respecting autonomy, we no longer want a centralist state. We are the only national civic movement and we must become a mass party, no to leaderism. We are not part of any pole and we are not interested in entering into this logic." About the Strait of Messina Bridge, De Luca said: "Years ago, when I held pro-bridge demonstrations, Minister [Matteo] Salvini hoped that Vesuvius and Etna would erupt to kill us all. I have always been pro-bridge, he hasn't. The Northern League deputy prime minister is probably in favour of the bridge due to other interests, but I am against building the bridge over the Strait of Messina using money that should be used for other things, but I have always been in favour of the 'Berlin-Palermo' corridor."

When asked in 2024 if he is left-wing or right-wing, De Luca replied: "Neither one nor the other, I'm about my own business, I'm Sturziano, I'm an administrator and not a politician, I was mayor by beating those who held seances to get votes." He is a strong critic of the centre-right coalition incumbent Sicily president Renato Schifani, accusing him of not caring about differentiated autonomy damaging Southern Italy and Sicily and of being the president of Forza Italia (FI) and not of Sicily. De Luca said that he does not like the incumbent European Commission president Ursula von der Leyen, and when asked about who he would prefer instead of her, De Luca answered: "Myself, I'm running for the presidency of the European Commission." Regarding Italia Viva (IV) leader Matteo Renzi, with whom he had a tense relationship – due to the defection of senator Dafne Musolino to Renzi's party, among other things – he said: "If you know Renzi, you avoid him, I've met him and I avoid him." De Luca praised the Democratic Party (PD) secretary Elly Schlein, saying: "She's surprising me, I must say, I like her, she's very good."

== Public image ==
De Luca attracted attention for his histrionic and overbearing personality, as well as for his impetuosity and propensity to argue with journalists and other politicians, earning the nickname Scateno, a pun of words between his first name and the Italian word for "unleash" in English; he is also described as a Masaniello. As a result, he is often compared to and confused with the incumbent Campania president Vincenzo De Luca, with whom he is not related, although he shares his histrionic manner and incendiary tones. In 2007, De Luca staged a protest, stripping himself naked in the press room of Palazzo dei Normanni, against the decision of the then Sicilian Regional Assembly (ARS) president not to include him in the Budget Commission; his naked body was covered by the Trinacria flag from the stomach down while he held a wooden Pinocchio in his right hand and a Bible in his left hand. In other occasions, De Luca showed up in his underwear at the province of Messina headquarters to protest against cuts in the water supply to the Aeolian Islands, dressed up as a character from Money Heist to monitor the progress of the construction sites when he was mayor of Messina, and once said: "I will set the ARS on fire, Palermo will collapse, and I will make the buildings tremble."

In part due to his simple and frank language, De Luca was able to elect a deputy and a senator in the 2022 Italian general election. He is also well known for his live streamings on Facebook, and he once blew a raspberry when referring to then Sicily president Nello Musumeci. In one of his live streamings in March 2020, when he was still mayor of Messina during the early stages of the COVID-19 pandemic in Italy, De Luca went to the port of Messina to block the transit of passengers arriving in Sicily. He addressed with offensive words Luciana Lamorgese, the then Minister of the Interior, who denounced him for contempt of the Italian Republic, the constitutional institutions, and the Armed Forces. In June 2020, Alfonso Bonafede, the then Minister of Justice, authorized the Messina prosecutor's office to proceed with the charges against De Luca, who was sentenced to pay a fine of €1,500 in June 2021. This was not the first time De Luca was the subject of an investigation, as he was twice arrested in 2011 and 2017, although he was acquitted both times. In November 2022, De Luca was among those investigated by the Messina prosecutor's office for environmental crimes linked to a former landfill in the Messina municipality; in particular, he was accused of the crime of failure to remediate for facts ascertained in October 2020. In October 2023, he was given eight months, with suspended sentence, for defamation due to what he wrote in the book Lupara giudiziaria (Judicial Lupara) about the former public prosecutor Vincenzo Barbaro, who had subsequently denounced him.

== Personal life ==
De Luca is married with Giusy Gregorio, and the couple has two children. De Luca said that he does not sleep at night, and mostly stay in bed for four hours and only sleep three hours a day in what he called his semi-sleep mode. De Luca further stated that he usually gets up from bed at 5:30 am and drink a liter of water at room temperature, then reads the press review, drink a coffee, and smokes a cigarette before taking what he said is his true passion, the clarinet. In his first act as regional deputy after being released from prison in December 2017, De Luca played a zampogna.

== Electoral history ==
Election	House	Constituency	Party	Votes	Result
2001	Sicilian Regional Assembly	Messina	PRI	2,057	Not Elected
2004	European Parliament	North-West Italy	Paese Nuovo	196	Not elected
2004	European Parliament	North-East Italy	Paese Nuovo	73	Not elected
2004	European Parliament	Central Italy	Paese Nuovo	859	Not elected
2004	European Parliament	Southern Italy	Paese Nuovo	4,898	Not elected
2004	European Parliament	Italian Islands	Paese Nuovo	9,938	Not elected
2006	Sicilian Regional Assembly	Messina	MpA	8,775	Elected
2008	Sicilian Regional Assembly	Messina	MpA	10,171	Elected
2017	Sicilian Regional Assembly	Messina	UDC	5,418	Elected
2022	Senate of the Republic	Sicily – Catania	ScN	60,384	Not elected
2023	Senate of the Republic	Lombardy – Monza	ScN	2,313	Not elected
2024	European Parliament	North-West Italy	Libertà	3,774	Not elected
2024	European Parliament	North-East Italy	Libertà	2,479	Not elected
2024	European Parliament	Central Italy	Libertà	2,253	Not elected
2024	European Parliament	Southern Italy	Libertà	5,221	Not elected
2024	European Parliament	Italian Islands	Libertà	70,081	Not elected

== Works ==
- Lupara giudiziaria. Nella dialettica processuale un arresto ci sta!, with preface by Carlo Taormina, Messina, Armando Siciliano Editore, 2018.
- Origini e prospettiva dell'autonomia siciliana. Breve testimonianza del saccheggio della Casta, Messina, Armando Siciliano Editore, 2018.
- Manuale dell'aspirante amministratore comunale, Messina, Armando Siciliano Editore, 2018.
- Non tutto è successo!, with preface by Catena Fiorello and postface by Red Ronnie, Milan, Edizioni Piemme, 2023.
