= List of mayors of Messina =

Mayor of Messina
- Sindaco di Messina
- Incumbent; Federico Basile since 28 May 2026
- Appointer: Popular election
- Term length: 5 years, renewable once
- Website: Official website

The Mayor of Messina is an elected politician who, along with the Messina's City Council, is accountable for the strategic government of Messina in Sicily, Italy.

== Overview ==
According to the Italian Constitution, the Mayor of Messina is member of the City Council.

The Mayor is elected by the population of Messina, who also elects the members of the City Council, controlling the Mayor's policy guidelines and is able to enforce his resignation by a motion of no confidence. The Mayor is entitled to appoint and release the members of his government.

Since 1994 the Mayor is elected directly by Messina's electorate: in all mayoral elections in Italy in cities with a population higher than 15,000 the voters express a direct choice for the mayor or an indirect choice voting for the party of the candidate's coalition. If no candidate receives at least 50% of votes, the top two candidates go to a second round after two weeks. The election of the City Council is based on a direct choice for the candidate with a preference vote: the candidate with the majority of the preferences is elected. The number of the seats for each party is determined proportionally.

== Italian Republic (since 1946) ==
=== City Council election (1947-1994) ===
From 1947 to 1994, the Mayor of Messina was elected by the City Council.

=== Direct election (since 1994) ===
Since 1994, under provisions of new local administration law, the Mayor of Messina is chosen by direct election, originally every four, then every five years.

	Mayor	Term start	Term end	Party	Coalition	Election
16	Francesco Providenti	28 June 1994	28 May 1998	PPI	PDS • PPI • PRI • PRC	1994
17	Salvatore Leonardi	28 May 1998	29 May 2003	CCD	FI • AN • CCD	1998
18	Giuseppe Buzzanca	29 May 2003	24 November 2003 (Note: Resigned after being found guilty of embezzlement.)	AN	FI • AN • UDC	2003
Special Prefectural Commissioner tenure (24 November 2003 – 14 December 2005)
19	Francantonio Genovese	14 December 2005	24 October 2007 (Note: Election invalidated because of irregularities.)	DL	DS • DL • UDEUR • SDI	2005
Special Prefectural Commissioner tenure (24 October 2007 – 20 June 2008)
(18)	Giuseppe Buzzanca	20 June 2008	31 August 2012 (Note: Resigned in order to participate in the regional election.)	PdL	PdL • UDC • MpA	2008
Special Prefectural Commissioner tenure (31 August 2012 – 25 June 2013)
20	Renato Accorinti	25 June 2013	26 June 2018	Ind	Left-wing independent lists	2013
21	Cateno De Luca	26 June 2018	14 February 2022 (Note: Resigned in order to participate in the regional election.)	SV	Centrist independent lists	2018
Special Prefectural Commissioner tenure (23 February 2022–16 June 2022)
22	Federico Basile	16 June 2022	27 February 2026 (Note: Resigned after losing the majority in the City Council.)	SV; ScN	Right-wing independent lists	2022
Special Prefectural Commissioner tenure (27 February 2026 – 28 May 2026)
(22)	Federico Basile	28 May 2026	Incumbent	ScN	ScN and independent lists	2026

== See also ==
- Timeline of Messina
- Politics of Sicily
