= Metropolitan cities of Italy =

Administrative divisions of Italy

Map of metropolitan cities as of 2025

The 15 metropolitan cities of Italy (Italian: città metropolitane d'Italia) are administrative divisions of Italy, operative since 2015, which are a special type of province. The metropolitan city, as defined by law, includes a large core city and the surrounding suburbs and countryside closely related to it by economic activities and essential public services, as well as to cultural relations and to territorial features.

== History ==
The original 1990 law defined as metropolitan cities the comuni of Turin, Milan, Venice, Genoa, Bologna, Florence, Rome, Bari, Naples and their respective hinterlands, reserving the autonomous regions the right to individuate metropolitan areas in their territory. In 2009, amendments added Reggio Calabria to the list. The metropolitan areas defined by the autonomous regions were: Cagliari and Sassari in Sardinia; Catania, Messina and Palermo in Sicily.

On 3 April 2014 the Italian Parliament approved a law that established ten metropolitan cities in Italy, excluding the autonomous regions. Five more were added later. The new metropolitan cities (except Sassari, which was established in 2021 and became operative in 2025) have been operative since 1 January 2015.

== Government ==
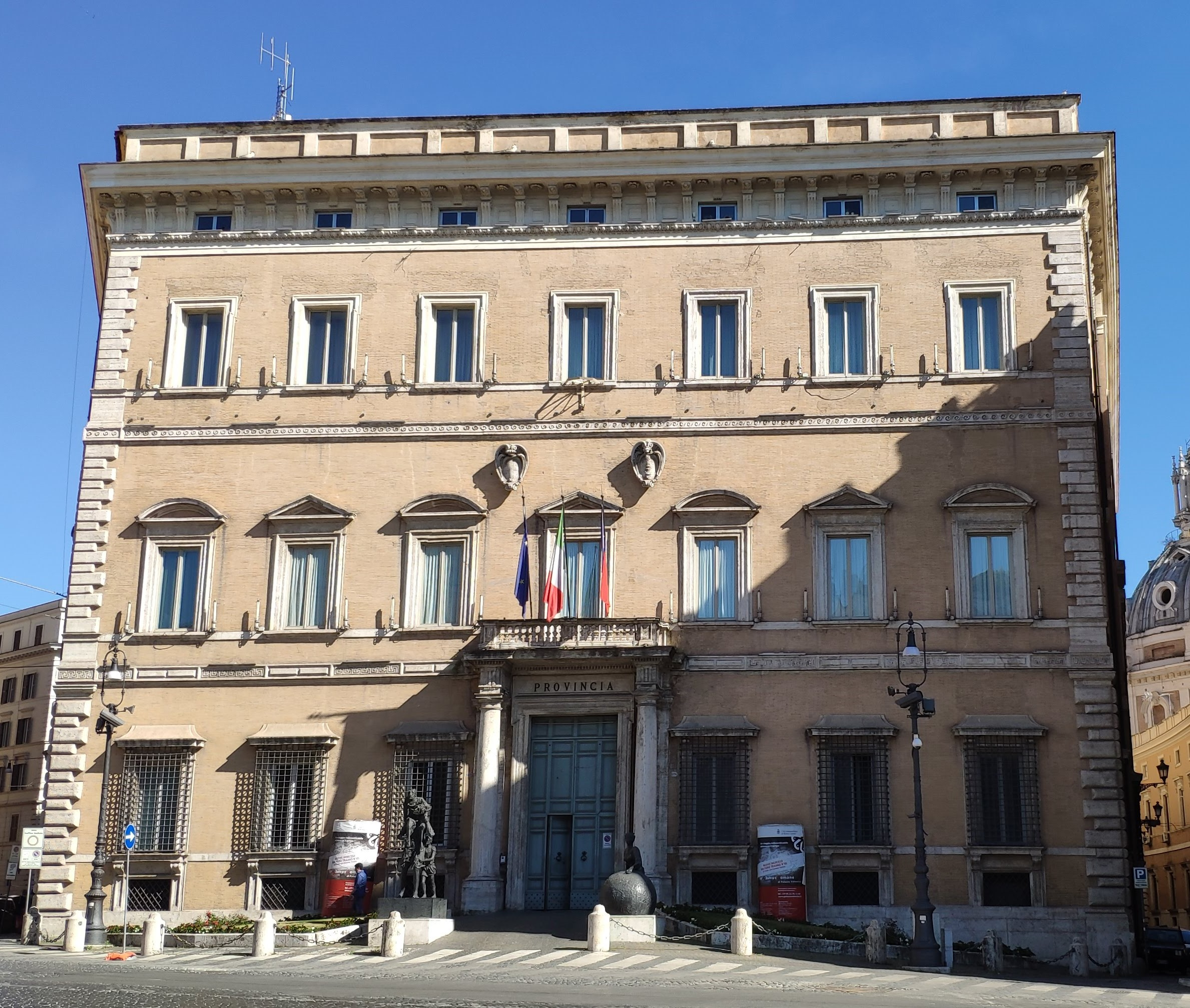
Palazzo Valentini is the seat of the Council of the Metropolitan City of Rome Capital.

A metropolitan city is composed of a central city, which serves as the seat of government, and its surrounding municipalities (comuni). Each metropolitan city is headed by a metropolitan mayor (sindaco metropolitano), who is assisted by a legislative body, the metropolitan council (consiglio metropolitano), and by a non-legislative assembly, the metropolitan conference (conferenza metropolitana).

The metropolitan mayor is the chief executive and administrative officer of the city. The mayor represents, convenes and chairs meetings of the metropolitan council, administers city offices, supervises the functioning of city services, and prepares the city's budget. The mayor of the provincial capital comune automatically becomes the metropolitan mayor.

The metropolitan council is the chief legislative body of the metropolitan city. It proposes laws and amendments to the metropolitan conference, and approves programs, regulations and rules submitted to it by the metropolitan mayor such as the budget. The council consists of mayors and city councillors of each commune in the metropolitan city elected from amongst themselves using partially open list proportional representation, with seats allocated using the D'Hondt method. Metropolitan councillors are elected at-large for five-year terms; votes for metropolitan councillors are weighted by grouping comunes of a certain population range into nine groups so that votes of the mayors and city councillors of the more populous groups are worth than those of less populous groups. The number of councillors a metropolitan city is granted depends upon its population: metropolitan cities with a population of 3 million or more have 24 councillors; metropolitan cities with a population of 800,000 but less than or equal to 3 million have 18 councillors; all other metropolitan cities have 14 councillors.

The metropolitan conference adopts or rejects laws and amendments approved by the metropolitan council. It is the ultimate approving body of the city's budget. Actions in the conference require votes of at least two-thirds of comunes in the metropolitan city and the majority of overall resident population. The conference is composed of all mayors of the communes within the metropolitan city.

== Functions ==
Metropolitan cities carry out the basic functions of a province, principally:

- Local planning and zoning
- Provision of local police services
- Transport and city services coordination

== Metropolitan cities ==
#	Metropolitan city	Area (km²)	Population (2025)	Density (inh./km^{2})	Operative since	Mayor
1	Rome (Roma)	5,352 km^{2} (2,066 sq mi)	4,223,885	789	1 January 2015	Roberto Gualtieri (PD)
2	Milan (Milano)	1,575 km^{2} (608 sq mi)	3,253,111	2,064	1 January 2015	Giuseppe Sala (Ind)
3	Naples (Napoli)	1,171 km^{2} (452 sq mi)	2,958,410	2,526	1 January 2015	Gaetano Manfredi (Ind)
4	Turin (Torino)	6,827 km^{2} (2,636 sq mi)	2,207,873	323	1 January 2015	Stefano Lo Russo (PD)
5	Bari	3,821 km^{2} (1,475 sq mi)	1,218,191	319	1 January 2015	Vito Leccese (PD)
6	Palermo	5,009 km^{2} (1,934 sq mi)	1,194,439	238	4 August 2015	Roberto Lagalla (UDC)
7	Catania	3,574 km^{2} (1,380 sq mi)	1,068,563	299	4 August 2015	Enrico Trantino (FdI)
8	Bologna	3,702 km^{2} (1,429 sq mi)	1,020,865	276	1 January 2015	Matteo Lepore (PD)
9	Florence (Firenze)	3,514 km^{2} (1,357 sq mi)	989,460	282	1 January 2015	Sara Funaro (PD)
10	Venice (Venezia)	2,462 km^{2} (951 sq mi)	833,934	339	1 January 2015	Simone Venturini (UDC)
11	Genoa (Genova)	1,839 km^{2} (710 sq mi)	818,651	445	1 January 2015	Silvia Salis (Ind)
12	Messina	3,266 km^{2} (1,261 sq mi)	595,948	182	4 August 2015	Federico Basile (ScN)
13	Cagliari	4,570 km^{2} (1,760 sq mi)	538,989	118	1 January 2017	Massimo Zedda (PP)
14	Reggio Calabria	3,183 km^{2} (1,229 sq mi)	511,935	161	31 January 2016	Francesco Cannizzaro (FI)
15	Sassari	4,285 km^{2} (1,654 sq mi)	312,555	73	1 April 2025	Giuseppe Mascia (PD)

== See also ==
- Regions of Italy
- Provinces of Italy
- List of cities in Italy
- Municipalities of Italy
