= Mayors of Italy =

Mayors of Italy Sindaci d'Italia
- President: Ernesto Magorno
- Vice president: Angelo Alessandri
- Founded: 4 October 2026
- Ideology: Regionalism; Autonomism; Civism
- Political position: Centre-right
- National affiliation: Centre-right coalition
- Chamber of Deputies: 0 / 400
- Senate: 0 / 205
- European Parliament: 0 / 76
- Regional Councils: 0 / 896

Website
- www.partitosindaciditalia.it/

Mayors of Italy (Sindaci d'Italia, SdI) is a regionalist and autonomist political party in Italy, founded on 4 October 2026. The party is chaired by Ernesto Magorno, former senator for the Democratic Party (PD).

== History ==
The movement was founded on 4 October 2026 in Assisi by a network of current and former local administrators. It was officially presented to the press the following day in Rome, at the Institute of Santa Maria in Aquiro. Its promoters included Ernesto Magorno, appointed chairman; Angelo Alessandri, appointed deputy chairman; and Paola Carnevale, appointed treasurer.

On 27 October 2026, a three-day national convention began in Rome, jointly organised by SdI and South calls North (ScN), the political movement founded by Cateno De Luca. The event, entitled was attended by local administrators, political figures and representatives of the Meloni Cabinet, including Senate President Ignazio La Russa and several government ministers. During the convention, the two movements formalised an electoral alliance with the aim of presenting a joint list at the next general election.

== Leadership ==
- President: Ernesto Mgorno (2026–present)
- Vice president: Angelo Alessandri (2026–present)
- Treasurer: Paola Carnevale (2026–present)

== See also ==
- List of political parties in Italy
