= Freedom Front =

Freedom Front may refer to:

- Freedom Front Plus, a right-wing political party in South Africa that was formed as the Freedom Front in 1994
- Freedom (electoral list), an Italian populist electoral list also referred to as the Freedom Front that was formed in 2024
