= 2022 Italian referendum =

Abrogative referendums on justice system reforms

2022 Abrogative Referendums in Italy
- 12 June 2022
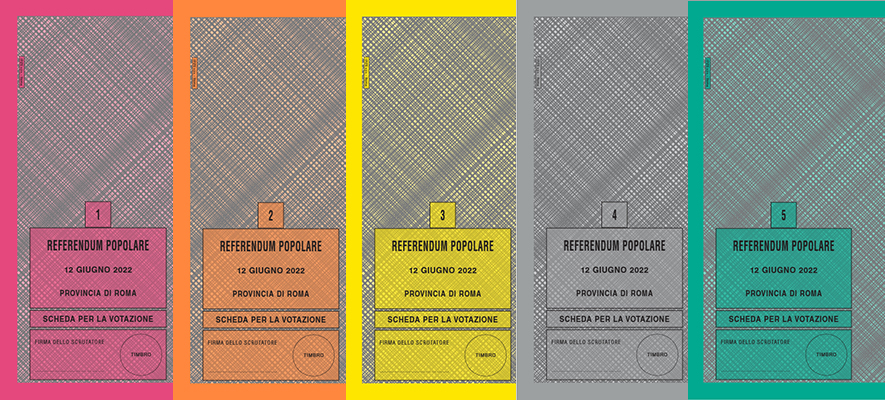
- Ballot colors for the five subjects of the referendum (Province of Rome)
- Voting system: Popular referendum
- Outcome: All five referendums declared invalid due to turnout below the 50% threshold

Results
Choice	Votes	%
Yes	5,805,180	51.19%
No	4,949,478	43.64%
Blank	164,122	1.45%
Invalid	421,820	3.72%
Valid votes	11,340,600	104.95%
Invalid votes	−535,026	−4.95%
Total votes	10,805,574	100.00%
Registered voters/turnout	51,533,195	20.94%

Repeal of the Severino Law on ineligibility and prohibition from public office
Yes	53.97%
No	46.03%

Limitation on pre-trial detention
Yes	56.12%
No	43.88%

Separation of careers for judges and prosecutors
Yes	74.01%
No	25.99%

Participation of lay members in evaluation of magistrates
Yes	71.94%
No	28.06%

Abolition of requirement for judicial candidates to obtain 25 endorsements
Yes	72.52%
No	27.48%

A five-part abrogative referendum was held in Italy on 12 June 2022. Voters were asked to decide on the repeal of five articles or decrees relating to the functions of the Italian judicial system. Each of the five questions were submitted by nine Italian regions, all governed by the centre-right coalition.

The 2022 Italian local elections were held on the same day.

== Procedure ==
Article 75 of the Constitution of Italy provides the possibility to hold a referendum to abolish a law or part of it. According to the law 352/70, the request for a referendum must either come from 500,000 signatures or the approval of the resolutions voted by at least five regional councils. The signatures must be collected on special forms with the object of the referendum on it, and they must be authenticated by a public officer. All Italian citizens who are able to vote can sign a referendum. Since August 2021, it is possible to collect signatures by using a digital ID too.

The signatures or the resolutions must be filed by 30 September of each year at the Central Office for the referendum at the Court of Cassation. The filing cannot take place in the year prior to a general election and in the six months following the election in order to avoid any overlapping. The Central Office must evaluate by 15 December the compliance of the rules of the proposed referendum according to the previous prerequisite by checking the validity of each signature collected or if the law the referendum intend to abolish is still in force.

Following the approval of the prerequisite of the proposed referendum, the Constitutional Court must set the date of the deliberation in the Council Chamber no later than 20 January of the following year, and it must appoint a Judge Rapporteur. The Constitutional Court, after the meeting in the Council Chamber, must pronounce if the requested referendum is ratified or rejected. According to the second paragraph of Article 75, the referendum as their object taxes, the State budget, amnesty and the international treaties, cannot take place. If a referendum is allowed, the President of the Republic sets the date for the referendum, which must take place in a date between 15 April and 15 June. A referendum, in order to be valid, must be voted by at least 50% and 1 of the people entitled to vote, and it must be approved by the 50% and 1 of the voters.

== Referendum initiative ==
Maurizio Turco, Secretary of the Transnational Radical Party, announced the intention to start collecting signatures for a new referendum regarding justice, following a scandal that involved the CSM. During an interview at Porta a Porta in May 2021, Matteo Salvini, the leader of Lega, said he would join the Radical Party's campaign. He believed that a justice reform would never be approved in Parliament with the Democratic Party and the Five Star Movement.

On 2 July, the Committee Just Justice Referendum started the collection of signatures, to get 1 million signatures before September. Secretary of the Democratic Party Enrico Letta defined the referendum as propaganda, accusing Salvini of wanting to buy time, announcing that he wanted to file his own bill on justice. The President of the National Magistrate Association Giuseppe Santalucia was also criticized the usage of the referendum, preferring the justice reforms under discussion in the Parliament. On 7 August, Salvini claimed they were close to the goal of 500,000 signatures.

The Cannabis Committee asked for an extension of the signature collection due date and the filing to the Court of Cassation; the cities were delaying the delivery of the signatures' certifications. The Council of the Ministers approved on 29 September an extension for the collection of signatures to 31 October, with the desertion of the ministers of Lega, since it would have benefited the cannabis referendum they were against.

Although the committee claimed to have collected at least 700,000 signatures for each of the six referendums, on 30 October, the committee filed the referendums to the Court of Cassation with the support of the resolutions voted by nine regional councils led by the centre-right coalition: Basilicata, Friuli-Venezia Giulia, Liguria, Lombardia, Piemonte, Sardegna, Sicilia, Umbria and Veneto. This choice led to a loss of 2.5 million euros reimbursement expected from the collection of signatures, thus excluding the Radical Party as representatives of the promoting committee since only the regional delegates (led by the centre-right) will be able to fund TV ads and collect subsidies as representatives of the referendum committee.

On February, an order of the day promoted by Lega asked the government to merge in a single day the 2022 Italian local elections and the referendum. The merger between two different kinds of elections are regulated by the Legislative Decree n. 98/2011, which doesn't include the abrogative referendum since the abstention can be used as a way to oppose the referendum (to be approved, an abrogative referendum must reach at least 50%+1 of turnout). The only time an abrogative referendum was held along with another election was in 2009, when the 2009 Italian referendum was merged to the second round of the 2009 Italian local elections; the 2020 Italian constitutional referendum was also held with 2020 Italian regional elections and 2020 Italian local elections. Finally, the Council of the Ministers approved the merger of the first round of the Italian local elections and the referendum in a single day, on 12 June. Only 8.5 million voters were called for the local elections during the first round, while the quorum requires at least 23 million of voters.

== Proposed referendum ==
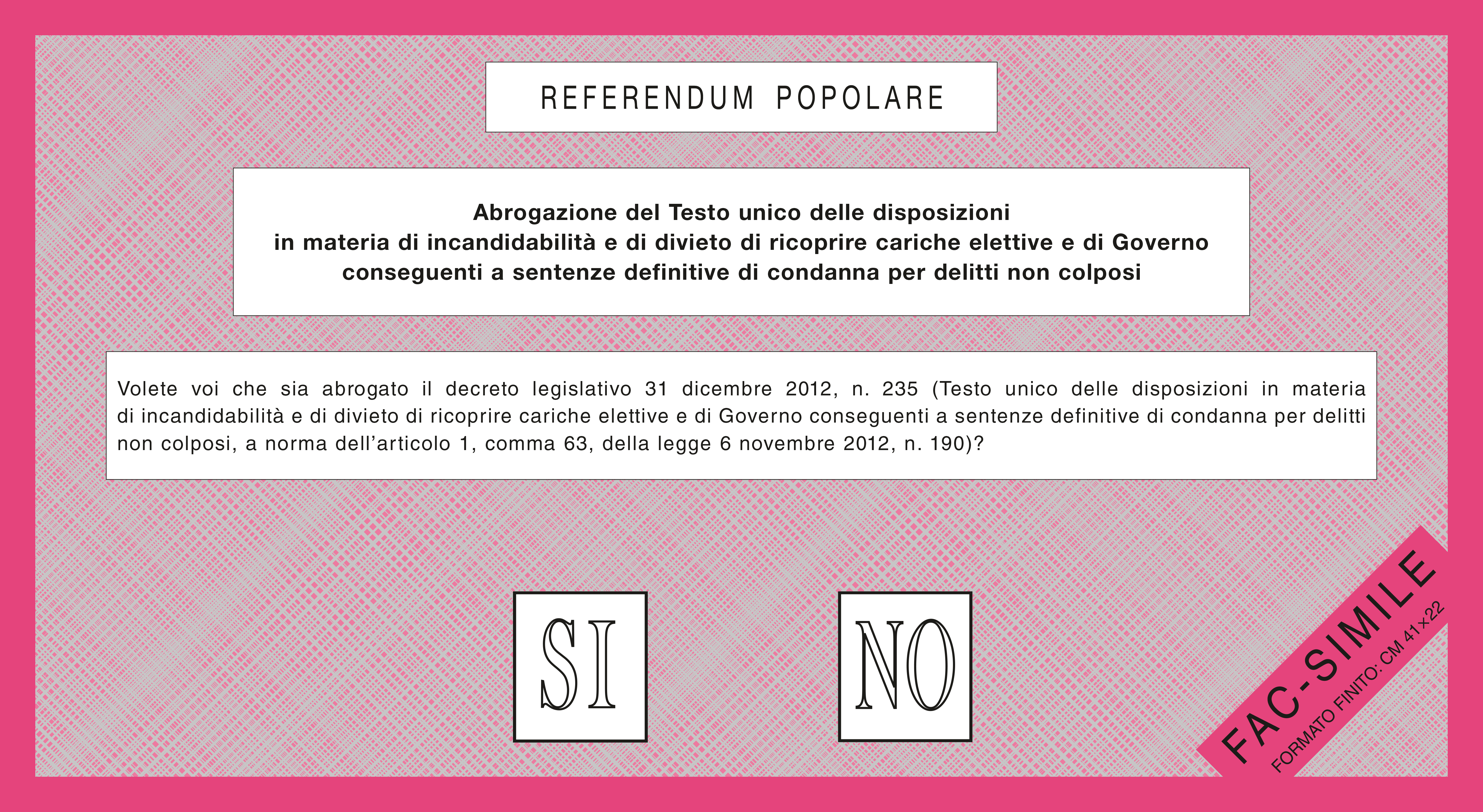
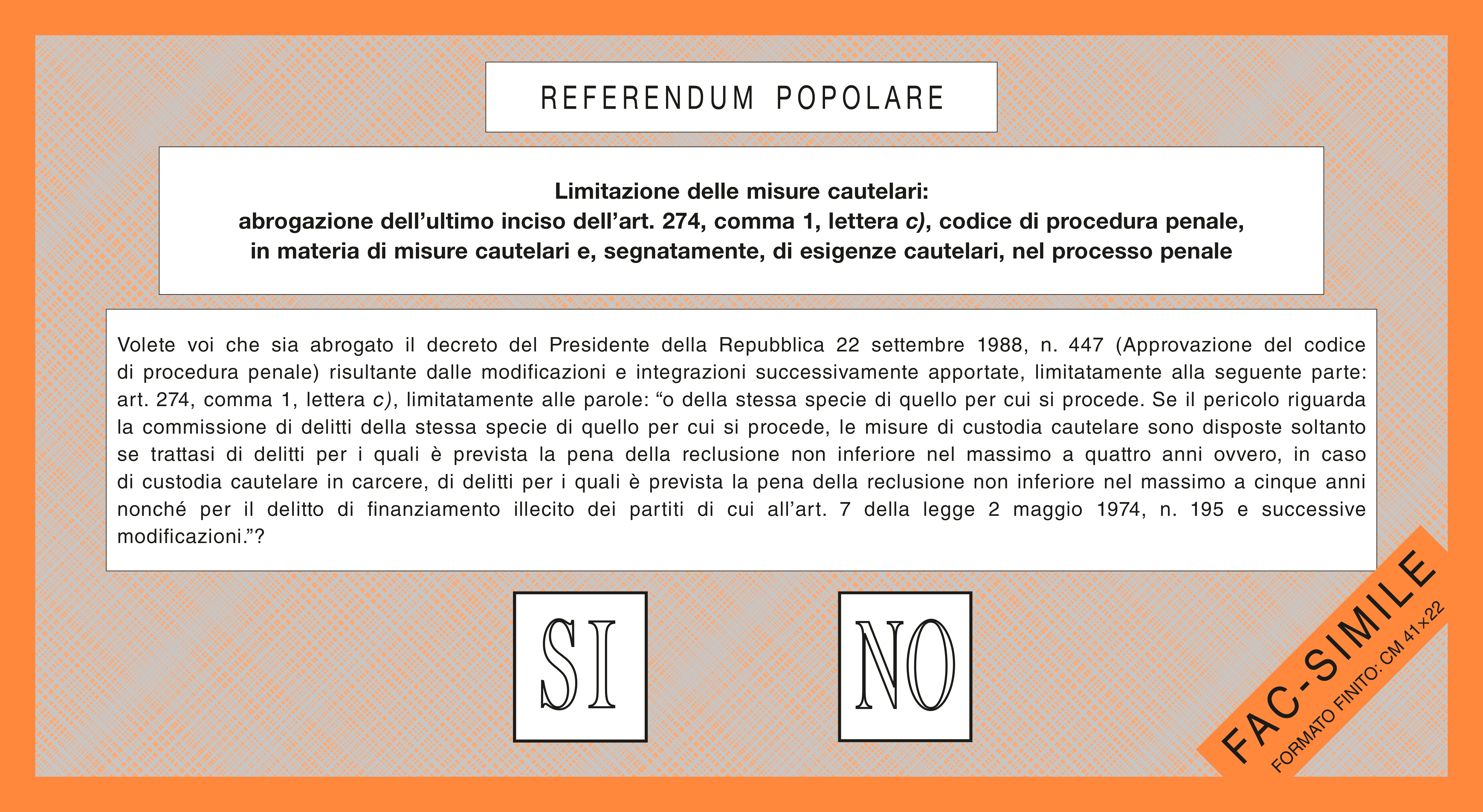
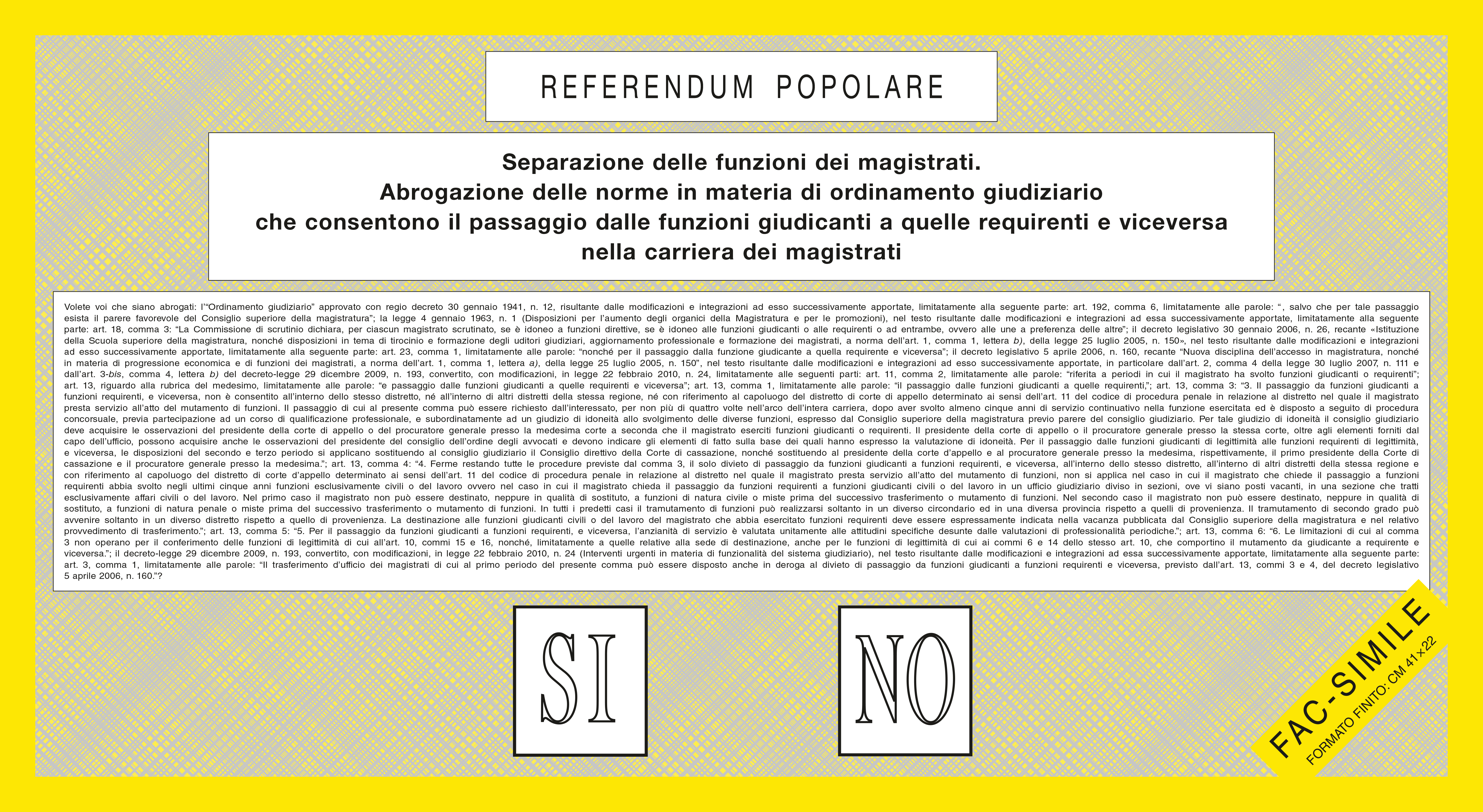
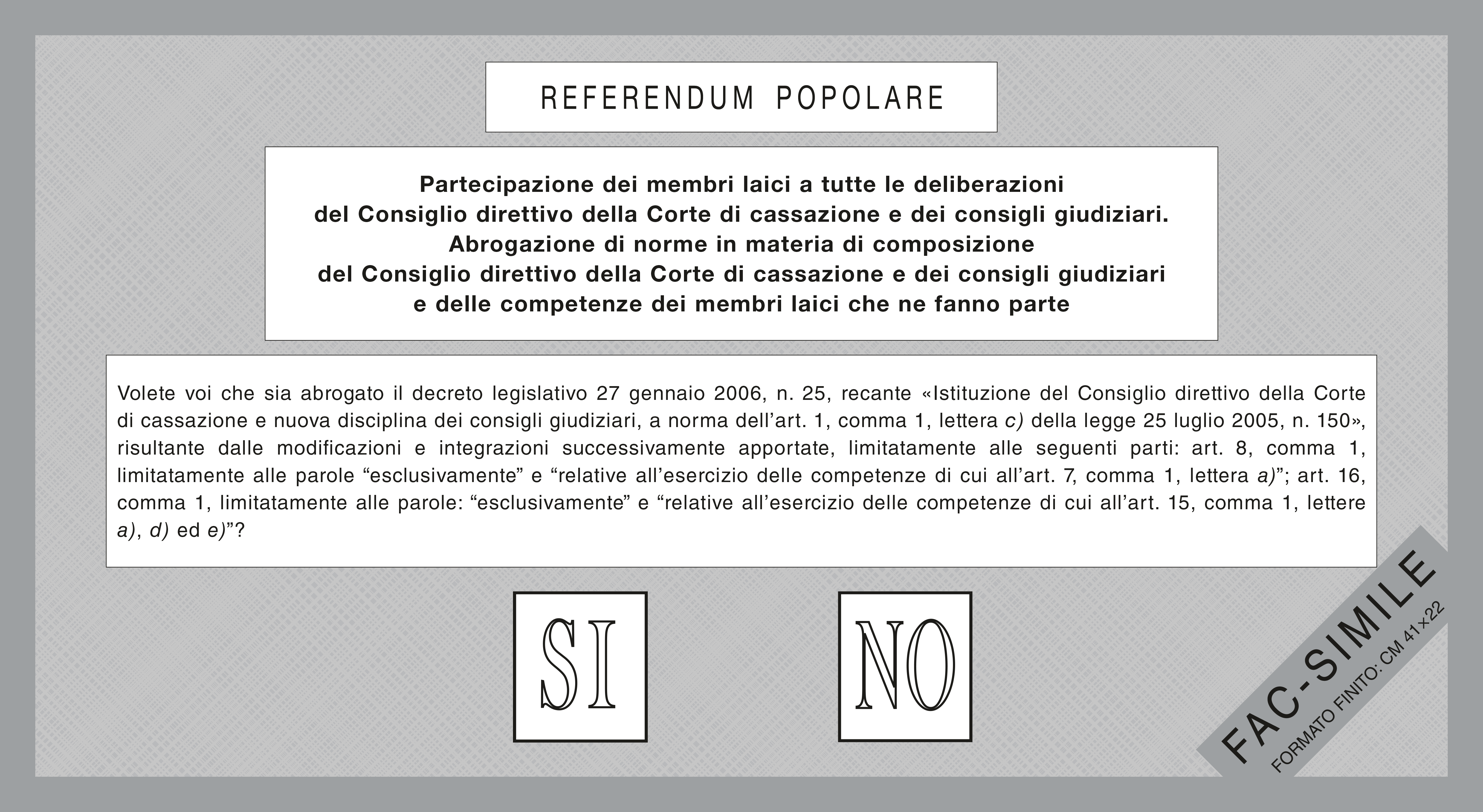
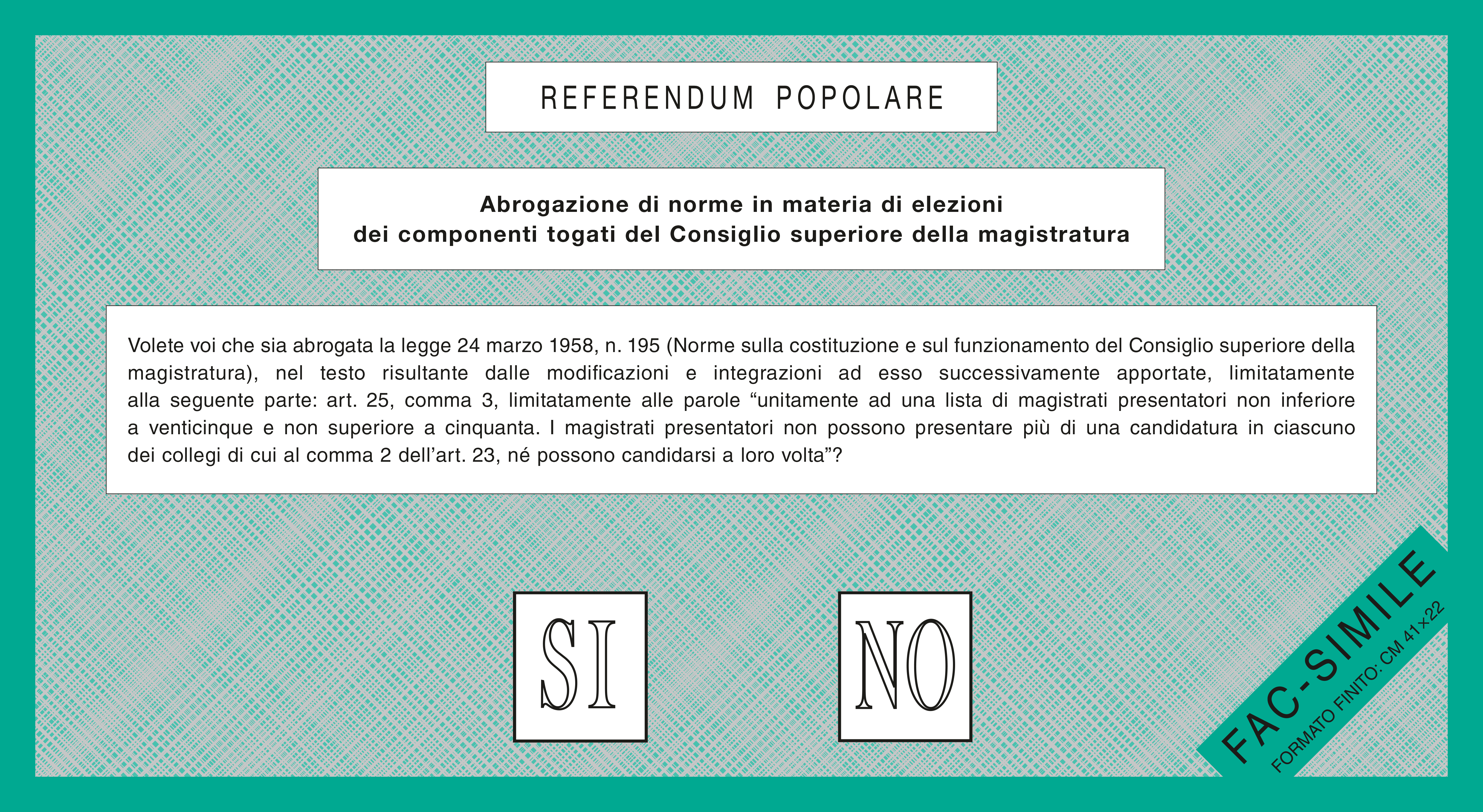
Ballot papers used in the referendum.

=== Abolition of Severino Law's enforcement decree ===
- Ballot colour: red

The first question aimed to repeal the automatic disqualification or suspension of politicians found guilty of crimes from the offices they hold. Law 190/2012, also known as the Severino law, named after then Justice Minister of the Monti Cabinet Paola Severino, aimed to fight corruption to increase transparency in the Public Administration and to identify cases of ineligibility for national or local election, as well as cases where suspension from public office is appropriate. Those who have received a sentence of more than two years in jail for crimes such as organized crime, terrorism, drug trafficking and crimes against the public administration were to be removed from public office, or suspended in case of a first instance judgment.

A notable application of the decree was in 2013, when former Prime Minister Silvio Berlusconi was sentenced to four years imprisonment and fined 7 million euros for tax fraud. In October, the Committee on Election and Parliamentary Immunity ruled out the disqualification of Berlusconi, and the next month the Senate voted for his expulsion. Berlusconi filed an appeal to the European Court of Human Rights, but he withdrew his application after the Court of Milan rehabilitated him in 2018 after he completed a course of community service.

The decree was also contested in 2014 by the Mayor of Salerno, Vincenzo De Luca, and the Mayor of Naples, Luigi De Magistris, who both were found guilty in a first instance judgment during two different trials and thus were suspended from their offices. Since the law doesn't rule out the eligibility of those who were condemned in a first instance judgment, De Luca could run in the meantime as President of Campania for the 2015 regional election, but was suspended for a short time immediately after he was elected. The two mayors filed an appeal to the Regional Administrative Court (TAR), raising a question of constitutional legitimacy. They were both re-admitted and awaited a judgment filed to the Constitutional Court. However, the Constitutional Court ruled that the appeal was rejected and that the Severino Law was not unconstitutional. By the time the Constitutional Court rejected their appeals, the Appeal Court acquitted both of them, and thus they could return to their offices.

The Ordinary Court of Genoa raised a plea of constitutionality to the Constitutional Court due to the suspension of a regional councillor in a first instance judgment. In 2021, the Constitutional Court ruled that it found nothing unlawful in the Severino Law.

The President of the National Association of Italian Municipalities and Mayor of Bari, Antonio Decaro, expressed his wish to change the Severino Law over the suspension of local politician, either by the Parliament or by the referendum.

=== Pre-trial detention ===
- Ballot colour: orange

In order to reduce the risk of re-offending before trial, a suspect may be detained pre-trial. The promoters of the article aimed to repeal the pre-trial detention motivated by risk of re-offending, leaving in place due to the risk of altering evidence or flight, reducing the consequence of detaining people subsequently found to be innocent.

=== Separation of the functions of the magistrates ===
- Ballot colour: yellow

The promoters of the article aimed to disallow prosecutors from becoming judges and vice versa, forcing magistrates to choose at the beginning of their career whether they want to be prosecutors or judges.

=== Lay members' vote in Judicial Councils ===
- Ballot colour: grey

Judicial Councils are composed of two thirds of magistrates and one third of lay members (lawyers and university professors), but the latter are excluded from taking part in the four-yearly review of the magistrates' work and professionalism. The referendum promoters aim to remove the exclusion of lay members from taking part in the evaluation of magistrates.

=== Election of judges of the High Council of the Judiciary ===
- Ballot colour: green

The promoters aim to remove the requirement for 25 to 50 signatures in support of the candidacy of a magistrate for the High Council of the Judiciary.

=== Rejected referendums ===
- The Associazione Luca Coscioni collected 1.2 million signatures in favour of the decriminalization of euthanasia by repealing a murder incident. While euthanasia in Italy is illegal, following a 2019 verdict of the Constitutional Court during the DJ Fabo case, under certain circumstances a person can request a passive euthanasia by refusing any treatment. The Constitutional Court urged the Parliament in 2018 to approve a law about the decriminalization of assisted suicide within a year, but the Parliament has not acted on it. In February 2022, the Constitutional Court rejected the referendum, citing the risk of failing to ensure the "necessary protection of human life".
- The Associazione Luca Coscioni, Meglio Legale (Legal is Better) and Italian Radicals collected 630,000 signatures in favour of repealing the crime of growing cannabis plants. The Constitutional Court rejected the referendum due to a possible violation of the international treaties signed by Italy.
- The Constitutional Court rejected one of the six referendums promoted by the Just Justice Committee on the direct liability of magistrates due to being "manipulative and unclear".
- An attempt to promote a referendum to ban hunting was made by Sì aboliamo la caccia (Yes let's abolish hunting), who announced they had collected 520,000 signatures. However, only half of the signatures were eventually filed, and only 120,000 of the signatures were considered valid.

== Campaign positions ==
=== Endorsements ===
==== Yes ====
===== Politicians =====
- Enza Bruno Bossio (PD) (all questions)
- Roberto Giachetti (IV) (all questions)
- Salvatore Margiotta (PD) (only 2nd, 3rd, and 4th)

===== Judges =====
- Vinicio Nardo, President of the Milan Bar Association (all questions)
- Carlo Nordio, former magistrate (all questions)
- Luca Palamara, former magistrate (all questions)
- Andrea Reale, GIP Trapani (5th question)

===== Organisations =====
Organisations	Political and cultural orientation	Leaders	Endorsed question(s)	Source(s)
Unione delle Camere Penali Italiane (UCPI) (Union of Italian Criminal Chambers)	Lawyer association	Gian Domenico Caiazza	1st, 2nd, 3rd, 4th	
Organismo Congressuale Forense (Bar Congressional Body)	Lawyer association	Sergio Paparo	All questions	
Italiastatodidiritto (Italyruleoflaw)	Lawyer association	Guido Camera	All questions	
Associazione Giustizia Giusta (Just Justice Association)		Andrea Piani	All questions	

===== Newspapers =====
Newspaper or periodical	Political and cultural orientation	Editor(s)	Endorsed question(s)	Source(s)
Il Riformista (The Reformist)	Libertarian	Piero Sansonetti	All questions	
Tempi (Times)	Catholic	Emanuele Boffi	All questions	
Linkiesta	Liberalism	Christian Rocca	3rd, 4th, 5th	

==== No ====
===== Judges =====
- Piercamillo Davigo, former togate member of the CSM
- Nicola Gratteri, former Chief Prosecutor of Catanzaro
- Roberto Scarpinato, former general prosecutor of Palermo

===== Organisations =====
Organisations	Political and cultural orientation	Leaders	Source(s)
Associazione Nazionale Partigiani d'Italia (ANPI) (National Association of Italian Partisans)	Charitable foundation	Gianfranco Pagliarulo	

===== Newspapers =====
Newspaper or periodical	Political and cultural orientation	Editor(s)	Endorsed question(s)	Source(s)
La Repubblica (The Republic)	Social democracy	Maurizio Molinari	All questions	

=== Committees ===
Choice	Committee	Spokesperson / Promoters	Website	Source(s)
Yes	Comitato Io Dico Sì (I Say Yes Committee)	Jacopo Morrone; Radical Party, Lega, FI, PSI, UdC, NPSI	referendumgiustizia.it	
Yes	Comitato promotore Giustizia Giusta (Just Justice Organizing Committee)	Matteo Salvini, Maurizio Turco	comitatogiustiziagiusta.it	
Yes	Comitato Garantista per il Sì (Guarantist Committee for Yes)	Italia Europea, Comitato Ventotene	garantistiperilsi.it	
Yes	Tutti Sì (All Yes)	More Europe		
Yes	Comitato SI per la Libertà, SI per la Giustizia (Committee Yes for Liberty, Yes for Justice)	Carlo Nordio	unsiperlagiustizia.it	
Yes	Comitato 6G (6G Committee)	Alfonso Fimiani	comitato6g.it	
No	Comitato Nazionale per il No sui referendum sulla giustizia (National Committee for the No to the justice referendums)	Alleanza Giellista, Critica Liberale		
No	Comitato per il NO ai referendum sulla giustizia (Committee for the No to the justice referendums)	Domenico Gallo		
No	Comitato il NO mediante il NON (Committee No through Not)	Riccardo Mastrorillo	ilnomedianteilnon.it	

=== Main political parties ===
Party	Ideology	Leader/s	1st question	2nd question	3rd question	4th question	5th question	Source(s)
Five Star Movement (M5S)	Populism	Giuseppe Conte	No	No	No	No	No	
League (Lega)	Right-wing populism	Matteo Salvini	Yes	Yes	Yes	Yes	Yes	
Democratic Party (PD)	Social democracy	Enrico Letta	No	No	No	No	No	
Forza Italia (FI)	Liberal conservatism	Silvio Berlusconi	Yes	Yes	Yes	Yes	Yes	
Brothers of Italy (FdI)	National conservatism	Giorgia Meloni	No	No	Yes	Yes	Yes	
Italia Viva (IV)	Liberalism	Matteo Renzi	Yes	Yes	Yes	Yes	Yes	
Coraggio Italia (CI)	Liberal conservatism	Luigi Brugnaro	Yes	Yes	Yes	Yes	Yes	
Article One (Art.1)	Social democracy	Roberto Speranza	No endorsement	No endorsement	No endorsement	No endorsement	No endorsement	
Action (A)	Social liberalism	Carlo Calenda	Yes	Yes	Yes	Yes	Yes	
Green Europe (EV)	Green politics	Angelo Bonelli, Eleonora Evi	Unknown	Unknown	Unknown	Unknown	Unknown	
Italian Left (SI)	Democratic socialism	Nicola Fratoianni	No	No	No	No	No	
Italexit	Hard euroscepticism	Gianluigi Paragone	Abstention	Abstention	Abstention	Abstention	Abstention	
More Europe (+E)	Liberalism	Benedetto Della Vedova	Yes	Yes	Yes	Yes	Yes	
Italian Radicals (RI)	Liberalism	Emma Bonino	Yes	Yes	Yes	Yes	Yes	
Italian Socialist Party (PSI)	Social democracy	Enzo Maraio	Yes	Yes	Yes	Yes	Yes	
New PSI (NPSI)	Social democracy	Lucio Barani	Yes	Yes	Yes	Yes	Yes	
Union of the Centre (UDC)	Christian democracy	Lorenzo Cesa	Yes	Yes	Yes	Yes	Yes	
Us with Italy (NcI)	Christian democracy	Maurizio Lupi	Yes	Yes	Yes	Yes	Yes	
Communist Party (PC)	Communism	Marco Rizzo	No	No	No	No	No	
Communist Refoundation Party (PRC)	Communism	Maurizio Acerbo	No	No	No	No	No	
Alternativa (A)	Populism	Pino Cabras	No	No	No	Yes	No endorsement	

== Opinion polls ==
=== Turnout ===
Date	Polling Firm	Sample size	Turnout				
Date	Polling Firm	Sample size	1st	2nd	3rd	4th	5th
24–26 May 2022	Termometro Politico	3,000	32.6–46.7				
18–23 May 2022	SWG	1,200	26.0–30.0				
17–19 May 2022	Ipsos	1,000	29.0	29.0	31.0	27.0	27.0
10–12 May 2022	Demopolis	1,500	30.0				
4–9 May 2022	SWG	1,200	31.0–35.0	31.0–35.0	31.0–35.0	29.0–33.0	29.0–33.0
16–18 Feb 2022	SWG	800	37.0	28.0	36.0	28.0	28.0

==== Rejected referendum ====
Date	Polling Firm	Sample size	Turnout		
Date	Polling Firm	Sample size	Civil liability of magistrates	Cannabis	Euthanasia
16–18 Feb 2022	SWG	800	51.0	41.0	56.0

=== Questions ===
Date	Polling Firm	Sample size	1st question				2nd question				3rd question				4th question				5th question			
Date	Polling Firm	Sample size	Yes	No	None / Don't know	Lead	Yes	No	None / Don't know	Lead	Yes	No	None / Don't know	Lead	Yes	No	None / Don't know	Lead	Yes	No	None / Don't know	Lead
18–23 May 2022	SWG	1,200	42.0	58.0	23.0	16.0	46.0	54.0	32.0	8.0	71.0	29.0	34.0	42.0	66.0	34.0	35.0	32.0	59.0	41.0	36.0	18.0
17–19 May 2022	Ipsos	1,000	11.0	14.0	4.0	3.0	11.0	13.0	5.0	2.0	21.0	4.0	6.0	17.0	15.0	6.0	6.0	9.0	14.0	6.0	7.0	8.0
10–12 May 2022	Demopolis	1,500	32.0	58.0	10.0	26.0	33.0	52.0	15.0	19.0	51.0	24.0	25.0	27.0	—N/a	—N/a	—N/a	—N/a	—N/a	—N/a	—N/a	—N/a
4–9 May 2022	SWG	1,200	24.0	54.0	22.0	30.0	29.0	38.0	33.0	9.0	47.0	22.0	31.0	25.0	39.0	25.0	36.0	14.0	35.0	29.0	36.0	6.0
16–18 Feb 2022	SWG	800	14.0	66.0	20.0	52.0	26.0	46.0	28.0	20.0	64.0	15.0	21.0	43.0	53.0	16.0	31.0	22.0	39.0	23.0	38.0	16.0
The Constitutional Court approves the referendum (15–16 February)
15–17 Gen 2022	Ipsos	1,000	20.0	26.0	54.0	6.0	17.0	26.0	57.0	9.0	36.0	10.0	54.0	26.0	28.0	12.0	60.0	16.0	23.0	11.0	66.0	12.0

== Results ==
The referendum did not meet the minimum turnout quota of 50%, and therefore did not provide a valid outcome. Each of the five question ballots reached a turnout of less than 20.5%.

Ineligibility after conviction
Choice	Votes	%
For	5,093,092	53.08
Against	4,501,877	46.92
Total	9,594,969	100.00
Valid votes	9,594,969	91.98
Invalid/blank votes	836,832	8.02
Total votes	10,431,801	100.00
Registered voters/turnout	50,910,473	20.49
Turnout needed		50.00
Source: Ministry of the Interior

Limitation of precautionary measures
Choice	Votes	%
For	5,271,228	55.37
Against	4,249,305	44.63
Total	9,520,533	100.00
Valid votes	9,520,533	91.33
Invalid/blank votes	904,105	8.67
Total votes	10,424,638	100.00
Registered voters/turnout	50,910,473	20.48
Turnout needed		50.00
Source: Ministry of the Interior

Separation of judiciary functions
Choice	Votes	%
For	6,968,829	73.26
Against	2,543,081	26.74
Total	9,511,910	100.00
Valid votes	9,511,910	91.22
Invalid/blank votes	915,124	8.78
Total votes	10,427,034	100.00
Registered voters/turnout	50,910,473	20.48
Turnout needed		50.00
Source: Ministry of the Interior

Lay members in judiciary councils
Choice	Votes	%
For	6,715,104	71.28
Against	2,705,341	28.72
Total	9,420,445	100.00
Valid votes	9,420,445	90.41
Invalid/blank votes	999,244	9.59
Total votes	10,419,689	100.00
Registered voters/turnout	50,910,473	20.47
Turnout needed		50.00
Source: Ministry of the Interior

Election of judges to the CSM
Choice	Votes	%
For	6,776,491	71.63
Against	2,684,184	28.37
Total	9,460,675	100.00
Valid votes	9,460,675	90.78
Invalid/blank votes	961,152	9.22
Total votes	10,421,827	100.00
Registered voters/turnout	50,910,473	20.47
Turnout needed		50.00
Source: Ministry of the Interior

== See also ==
- 2022 Italian local elections
- 2022 Italian by-elections
- 2022 Sicilian regional election
- 2022 Italian general election
