= Cosimo Cannito =

Italian politician

Mayor of Barletta
- Incumbent
- Assumed office 29 June 2022
- In office 15 June 2018 – 13 October 2021
- Preceded by: Pasquale Cascella

Personal details
- Born: Cosimo Damiano Cannito; 10 April 1951 (age 75) Barletta, Province of Bari, Italy
- Party: Centre-right independent (since 2018)
- Other political affiliations: PSI (till 1994); SI (1994-1998); SDI (1998-2007); PSI (2007-2018)
- Education: University of Naples Federico II
- Profession: Physician, University professor

Cosimo Cannito (born 10 April 1951) is an Italian politician, mayor of Barletta from 2018 to 2021 and again since 2022.

== Life and career ==
Former member of the Italian Socialist Party, Cannito ran as an independent for the office of Mayor of Barletta at the 2018 Italian local elections, supported by a centre-right coalition. He won and took office on 15 June 2018.

On 13 October 2021, Cannito was ousted from the office of mayor by the majority of the comunal councilors, being later re-elected mayor at the 2022 elections.

== See also ==
- 2018 Italian local elections
- 2022 Italian local elections
- List of mayors of Barletta
