= Giuseppe Buzzanca =

Italian politician (born 1954)

Member of the Sicilian Regional Assembly
- In office 22 May 2008 – 29 October 2012

Mayor of Messina
- In office 17 June 2008 – 31 August 2012
- Preceded by: Francantonio Genovese
- Succeeded by: Renato Accorinti
- In office 27 May 2003 – 24 November 2003
- Preceded by: Salvatore Leonardi
- Succeeded by: Francantonio Genovese

President of the Province of Messina
- In office 22 June 1994 – 28 May 2003
- Preceded by: Amelia Ioli Gigante
- Succeeded by: Salvatore Leonardi

Personal details
- Born: 2 January 1954 (age 72) Barcellona Pozzo di Gotto, Province of Messina, Italy
- Party: Italian Social Movement; National Alliance; The People of Freedom; Lega
- Education: University of Messina
- Occupation: Physician

Giuseppe Buzzanca (born 2 January 1954) is an Italian physician and politician. A former member of the Italian Social Movement, National Alliance and The People of Freedom, he served as mayor of Messina on two occasions and as president of the Province of Messina from 1994 to 2003. He was also elected to the Sicilian Regional Assembly.
