= Sicilia Vera =

True Sicily Sicilia Vera
- Leader: Cateno De Luca
- Founded: 2007
- Split from: Movement for Autonomy
- Headquarters: Via Oratorio San Francesco is. 306 n. 5, Messina
- Ideology: Regionalism; Populism
- National affiliation: South calls North

Website
- www.siciliavera.com

Sicilia Vera (lit. 'True Sicily') is a political party active in Sicily, led by Cateno De Luca.

"Vera" is also an acronym for Verso una Economia Regionale Autonoma (lit. 'Towards an Autonomous Regional Economy').

== History ==
The party was founded in 2007 by Cateno De Luca, at that time deputy of the Sicilian Regional Assembly.

In the 2008 Sicilian regional election, De Luca found an agreement with the Movement for Autonomy (his former party) and was re-elected on its lists. In the 2012 Sicilian regional election De Luca ran for the presidency of the region with his own list, "Sicilian Revolution" (including also Sicilia Vera), but he scored just 1.2% of the vote and was not re-elected. On the occasion of the 2017 Sicilian regional election, Sicilia Vera made an electoral agreement with the Union of the Centre and De Luca was re-elected to the ARS, but on 20 December he left the UDC group and joined the mixed group.

In the 2018 Italian local elections, De Luca was elected in the ballot (with 65.3% of the votes) mayor of Messina, at the head of a set of civic lists promoted by Sicilia Vera, which however did not get even a seat due to the threshold barrier of 5%.

On 30 October 2018, De Luca resigned as a regional deputy to keep the office of mayor of Messina. His seat was assigned on to Danilo Lo Giudice, mayor of Santa Teresa di Riva and also a member of Sicilia Vera, who joined the mixed group.

In the 2022 Italian local elections, the mayoral candidate of Messina for the civic lists promoted by Sicilia Vera, Federico Basile, won with 45.6% of the vote, while its coalition got 20 seats out of 36 in the municipal council.

On 27 June 2022, De Luca founded a new movement called South calls North, federated with Sicilia Vera, in support of his candidacy for the presidency of the Sicily. De Luca assumed the role of coordinator of the new movement while MEP Dino Giarrusso, former Five Star Movement member, becomes its secretary. The ex-journalist of Le Iene Ismaele La Vardera also joined the movement, assuming the role of federal president and spokesperson in the electoral campaign of De Luca for the regional election of September.

At the beginning of August, the political agreement between De Luca and Giarrusso is broken, due to disagreements over the candidacies for the 2022 Italian general election, and the movement remains headed by De Luca.

== Election results ==
=== European Parliament ===
Election	Leader	Votes	%	Seats	+/–	EP Group
2019	Cateno De Luca	Into FI		0 / 76	New	–
2024	Cateno De Luca	Into Freedom		0 / 76	0	–

== See also ==
- South Calls North
