= Caterina Chinnici =

Italian magistrate and politician (born 1954)

Caterina Chinnici MEP
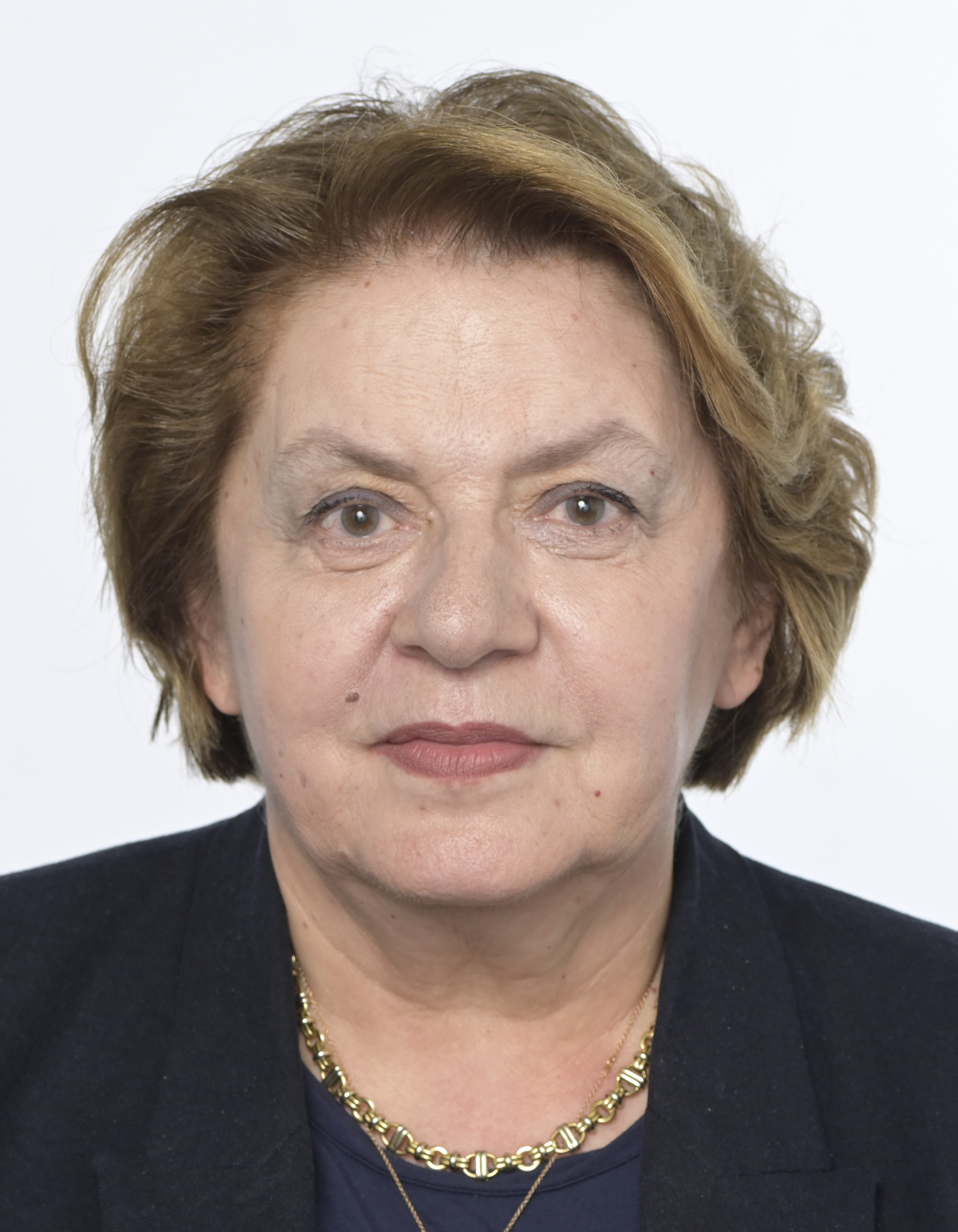
- Official portrait, 2024

Member of the European Parliament for Italian Islands
- Incumbent
- Assumed office 25 May 2014

Personal details
- Born: 5 November 1954 (age 71) Palermo, Italy
- Party: FI (since 2023)
- Other political affiliations: PD (2014–2023)
- Spouse: Manlio Averna
- Children: 2
- Parent: Rocco Chinnici (father)
- Education: University of Palermo
- Occupation: Magistrate • Politician

Caterina Chinnici (born 5 November 1954) is an Italian magistrate and politician who has been serving as a Member of the European Parliament since 2014.

In 2022, she was the centre-left coalition candidate to the Sicilian regional election, placing in third.

== Early life and career ==
Born in Palermo, Chinnici is the daughter of the judge Rocco Chinnici, killed by the Sicilian Mafia in 1983. Graduated in law at 21 years old, she was Prosecutor General of the Court of Appeal of Caltanissetta, and Public Prosecutor at the juvenile court in Caltanissetta and later in Palermo.

In June 2009, the president of Sicily Raffaele Lombardo appointed her regional councillor for family and local governments, and then regional councillor for the civil service until July 2012.

== Member of the European Parliament ==
In the 2014 European elections, Chinnici became a Member of the European Parliament (MEP) with the Democratic Party. She has since been a member of the Committee on Civil Liberties, Justice and Home Affairs. In addition, she has been serving as vice-chair of the Committee on Budgetary Control since 2019. She was a member of the Special Committee on Terrorism between 2017 and 2018.Debono, Fiona Galea (2021-10-15). "Daughter of Sicilian judge killed by Mafia to speak at Daphne vigil". Times of Malta.

In addition to her committee assignments, Chinnici serves as co-chairwoman of the European Parliament Intergroup on Children's Rights. She is also a member of the European Parliament Intergroup on Fighting against Poverty, the European Parliament Intergroup on Integrity (Transparency, Anti-Corruption and Organized Crime) and the European Parliament Intergroup on Cancer.

== Other activities ==
In 2014, Chinnici released the autobiographical book È così lieve il tuo bacio sulla fronte.
