= Federico Basile =

Italian politician

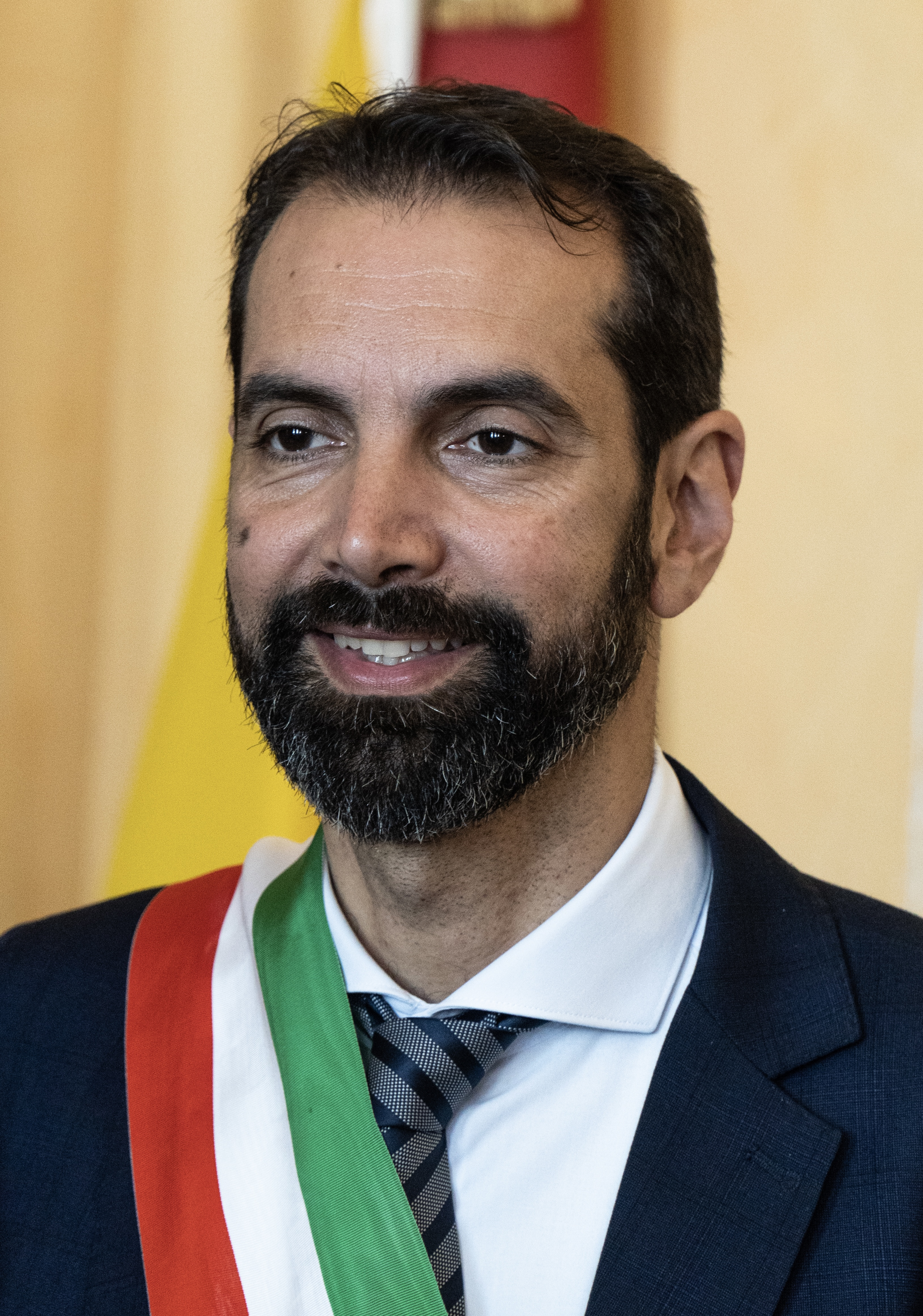

Mayor of Messina
- Incumbent
- Assumed office 28 May 2026
- In office 16 June 2022 – 27 February 2026
- Preceded by: Cateno De Luca

Metropolitan Mayor of Messina
- Incumbent
- Assumed office 28 May 2026
- In office 16 June 2022 – 27 February 2026
- Preceded by: Cateno De Luca

Personal details
- Born: 19 June 1977 (age 49) Messina, Italy
- Party: South calls North
- Education: University of Messina
- Occupation: Politician, chartered accountant

Federico Basile (born 19 June 1977) is an Italian politician who has been serving as mayor of Messina.

== Biography ==
Basile holds a degree in economics and commerce from the University of Messina. In 2005 he obtained the qualification to the profession of chartered accountant, as well as to that of auditor.

From 2013 to 2018 he was a member of the board of auditors of the University of Messina, while from 2016 to 2017 he was an expert in marketing and economy of the territory of the municipality of Montalbano Elicona. Since February 2020 he has held the dual office of president of the evaluation unit of the metropolitan city of Messina and general manager of the municipality of Messina.

=== Mayor of Messina ===
In 2022 he was a candidate for Mayor of Messina in view of the local elections with the Sicilia Vera party of the resigning mayor Cateno De Luca, together with eight civic lists and the Lega. He wins in the first round, thanks to the regional electoral law which provides for the direct election of the candidate for mayor who obtains at least 40% of the votes, with 44% of the votes. On June 16 he was officially proclaimed mayor of Messina.
