= 2022 Italian local elections =

The 2022 Italian local elections were held in various Italian local communities on 12 June 2022, with a run-off round on 26 June. Local elections in Trentino-Alto Adige/Südtirol were held on 15 May, with a second ballot on 29 May, while local elections in Aosta Valley on 29 May, with a second ballot on 12 June. Elections took place in 980 out of 7,904 municipalities, 26 of which were provincial capitals. Mayors and city councils were elected for the ordinary five-year terms, lasting till 2027.

== Voting system ==
The voting system is used for all mayoral elections in Italy in the cities with a population higher than 15,000 inhabitants. Under this system, voters express a direct choice for the mayor or an indirect choice voting for the party of the candidate's coalition. If no candidate receives 50% of votes during the first round, the top two candidates go to a second round after two weeks. The winning candidate obtains a majority bonus equal to 60% of seats. During the first round, if no candidate gets more than 50% of votes but a coalition of lists gets the majority of 50% of votes or if the mayor is elected in the first round but its coalition gets less than 40% of the valid votes, the majority bonus cannot be assigned to the coalition of the winning mayor candidate.

The election of the City Council is based on a direct choice for the candidate with a maximum of two preferential votes, each for a different gender, belonging to the same party list: the candidate with the majority of the preferences is elected. The number of the seats for each party is determined proportionally, using D'Hondt seat allocation. Only coalitions with more than 3% of votes are eligible to get any seats.

== Municipal elections ==
=== Mayoral election results ===
Centre-left coalition
Centre-right coalition
Civic lists
Prefectural commissioner

Region	City	Population	Incumbent mayor	Elected mayor	1st round		2nd round		Seats	Source
Region	City	Population	Incumbent mayor	Elected mayor	Votes	%	Votes	%	Seats	Source
Piedmont	Alessandria	91,089	Gianfranco Cuttica di Revigliasco (Lega)	Giorgio Abonante (PD)	13,805	42.04	14,590	54.41	20 / 32	
Piedmont	Asti	74,065	Maurizio Rasero (FI)	Maurizio Rasero (FI)	16,709	55.65	—	—	20 / 32	
Piedmont	Cuneo	55,822	Federico Borgna (Ind.)	Patrizia Manassero (PD)	11,319	46.95	10,467	63.31	20 / 32	
Lombardy	Como	84,250	Mario Landriscina (Ind.)	Alessandro Rapinese (Ind.)	8,443	27.32	14,067	55.36	20 / 32	
Lombardy	Lodi	44,815	Sara Casanova (Lega)	Andrea Furegato (PD)	11,246	59.03	—	—	20 / 32	
Lombardy	Monza	122,522	Dario Allevi (FI)	Paolo Pilotto (PD)	17,767	40.08	18,307	51.21	20 / 32	
Veneto	Belluno	35,522	Jacopo Massaro (Ind.)	Oscar De Pellegrin (Ind.)	7,780	50.73	—	—	20 / 32	
Veneto	Padua	209,730	Sergio Giordani (Ind.)	Sergio Giordani (Ind.)	47,777	58.44	—	—	21 / 32	
Veneto	Verona	258,031	Federico Sboarina (FdI)	Damiano Tommasi (Ind.)	43,106	39.80	50,118	53.40	22 / 36	
Friuli-Venezia Giulia	Gorizia	34,087	Rodolfo Ziberna (FI)	Rodolfo Ziberna (FI)	6,330	42.56	6,372	52.23	24 / 40	
Liguria	Genoa	566,410	Marco Bucci (Ind.)	Marco Bucci (Ind.)	112,457	55.49	—	—	24 / 40	
Liguria	La Spezia	92,441	Pierluigi Peracchini (C!)	Pierluigi Peracchini (C!)	19,379	53.58	—	—	20 / 32	
Emilia-Romagna	Parma	195,998	Federico Pizzarotti (IiC)	Michele Guerra (Ind.)	32,567	44.18	37,319	66.19	20 / 32	
Emilia-Romagna	Piacenza	102,731	Patrizia Barbieri (Ind.)	Katia Tarasconi (PD)	15,828	39.93	16,935	53.46	20 / 32	
Tuscany	Lucca	89,378	Alessandro Tambellini (PD)	Mario Pardini (Ind.)	12,278	34.45	16,920	51.03	20 / 32	
Tuscany	Pistoia	89,729	Alessandro Tomasi (FdI)	Alessandro Tomasi (FdI)	20,192	51.49	—	—	20 / 32	
Lazio	Frosinone	44,491	Nicola Ottaviani (Lega)	Riccardo Mastrangeli (FI)	11,856	49.26	10,794	55.32	20 / 32	
Lazio	Rieti	45,907	Antonio Cicchetti (FI)	Daniele Sinibaldi (FdI)	12,785	52.17	—	—	20 / 32	
Lazio	Viterbo	66,113	Antonella Scolamiero (Note: Prefectural commissioner replacing mayor Giovanni Arena (Forza Italia) since 27 December 2021)	Chiara Frontini (Ind.)	10,454	32.82	16,160	64.92	20 / 32	
Abruzzo	L'Aquila	69,349	Pierluigi Biondi (FdI)	Pierluigi Biondi (FdI)	20,463	54.39	—	—	20 / 32	
Apulia	Barletta	92,787	Francesco Alecci (Note: Prefectural commissioner replacing mayor Cosimo Cannito (Centre-right independent) since 15 October 2021)	Cosimo Cannito (Ind.)	20,276	42.27	22,427	65.03	20 / 32	
Apulia	Taranto	190,717	Vincenzo Cardellicchio (Note: Prefectural commissioner replacing mayor Rinaldo Melucci (Democratic Party) since 26 November 2021)	Rinaldo Melucci (PD)	49,807	60.63	—	—	20 / 32	
Calabria	Catanzaro	86,183	Sergio Abramo (CI)	Nicola Fiorita (Ind.)	14,966	31.71	17,823	58.24	10 / 32	
Sicily	Messina	222,329	Leonardo Santoro (Note: Prefectural commissioner replacing mayor Cateno De Luca (Sicilia Vera) since 22 February 2022)	Federico Basile (SV)	44,937	45.56	—	—	20 / 32	
Sicily	Palermo	637,885	Leoluca Orlando (PD)	Roberto Lagalla (UDC)	98,448	47.63	—	—	24 / 40	
Sardinia	Oristano	30,723	Andrea Lutzu (FdI)	Massimiliano Sanna (RS)	7,987	54.22	—	—	15 / 24	

== See also ==
- 2022 Italian referendum
