= Renato Accorinti =

Italian politician

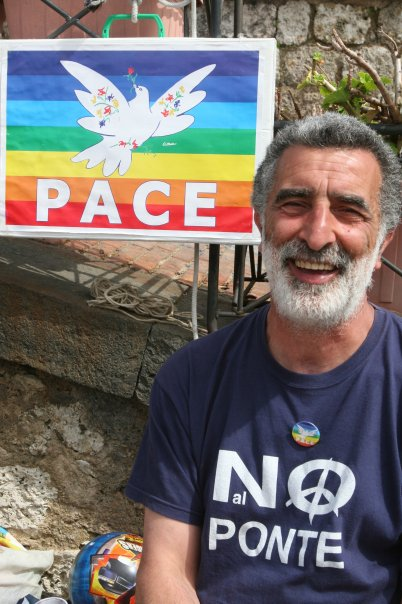

Mayor of Messina
- In office 25 June 2013 – 26 June 2018
- Preceded by: Giuseppe Buzzanca
- Succeeded by: Cateno De Luca

Metropolitan mayor of Messina
- In office 10 June 2016 – 26 June 2018
- Preceded by: Office established
- Succeeded by: Cateno De Luca

Personal details
- Born: 30 March 1954 (age 72) Messina, Sicily, Italy
- Party: Independent (left-wing)
- Education: University of Palermo
- Profession: Activist, teacher

Renato Accorinti (born 30 March 1954, in Messina) is an Italian politician and activist.

Non-violent activist, pacifist and environmentalist involved in the social struggles against the Mafia in Sicily and corruption, he ran for Mayor of Messina as an independent at the 2013 municipal elections. He was elected and took office on 25 June 2013.

He also served as the first Metropolitan mayor of Messina from June 2016 to June 2018.

== See also ==
- 2013 Italian local elections
- List of mayors of Messina

Political offices
Preceded by Giuseppe Buzzanca	Mayor of Messina; 2013–2018	Succeeded by Cateno De Luca
Political offices
Preceded by –	Metropolitan Mayor of Messina; 2016–2018	Succeeded by Cateno De Luca
