= Laura Castelli =

Italian politician (born 1986)

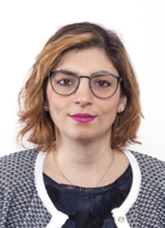

Member of the Chamber of Deputies
- In office 15 March 2013 – 13 October 2022
- Constituency: Piedmont 1

Personal details
- Born: 14 September 1986 (age 39) Turin, Italy
- Party: M5S (2009–2022); IpF (2022); ScN (2023–present)
- Education: University of Turin
- Profession: Politician, Tax Assistant

Laura Castelli (born 14 September 1986) is an Italian politician.

== Biography ==
Castelli was born in Turin. After the graduation with a Bachelor's degree in Business Economics, she worked for a short period in a tax assistance center.

In the 2013 general elections, she was elected Deputy among the ranks of the Five Star Movement. She was re-elected Deputy in the 2018 general elections. After participating in the drafting of the so-called "government contract" between Five Star Movement and League, on 12 June she was appointed Undersecretary at the Ministry of Economy in the Conte Government.

On 21 March 2019 she was promoted, together with Massimo Garavaglia (Lega Nord), Deputy Minister of Economy. She was confirmed Deputy Minister in the Conte II Cabinet.

On 28 June 2021 the tribunal of Turin has convicted Laura Castelli for aggravated defamation. The proceeding concerned a post on Facebook in which she edited a photo to make believe a flirt between Piero Fassino and a PD candidate for the 2016 administrative elections, Lidia Roscaneanu. She was sentenced to a fine of 1,032 euro and a damage compensation of 5,000 euro.
