= List of mayors of Barletta =

Mayor of Barletta
- Sindaco di Barletta
- Incumbent; Cosimo Cannito since 29 June 2022
- Appointer: Popular election
- Term length: 5 years, renewable once
- Formation: 1860
- Website: Official website

The mayor of Barletta is an elected politician who, along with the Barletta City Council, is accountable for the strategic government of Barletta in Apulia, Italy.

The current mayor is Cosimo Cannito, a centre-right independent, who took office on 29 June 2022.

== Overview ==
According to the Italian Constitution, the mayor of Barletta is member of the City Council.

The mayor is elected by the population of Barletta, who also elects the members of the City Council, controlling the mayor's policy guidelines and is able to enforce his resignation by a motion of no confidence. The mayor is entitled to appoint and release the members of his government.

Since 1994 the mayor is elected directly by Barletta's electorate: in all mayoral elections in Italy in cities with a population higher than 15,000 the voters express a direct choice for the mayor or an indirect choice voting for the party of the candidate's coalition. If no candidate receives at least 50% of votes, the top two candidates go to a second round after two weeks. The election of the city council is based on a direct choice for the candidate with a preference vote: the candidate with the majority of the preferences is elected. The number of the seats for each party is determined proportionally.

== Italian Republic (since 1946) ==
=== City Council election (1946–1994) ===
From 1946 to 1994, the mayor of Barletta was elected by the City Council.

	Mayor	Term start	Term end	Party
1	Isidoro Alvisi	1946	1952	DC
2	Giovanni Paparella	1952	1956	PSI
3	Giuseppe Palmitessa	1956	1962	DC
4	Carlo Ettore Borgia	1962	1965	DC
5	Michele Morelli	1965	1970	DC
6	Domenico Borraccino	1970	1972	PCI
7	Giuseppe Rizzi	1972	1973	PCI
8	Michele Tupputi	1973	1975	DC
(3)	Giuseppe Palmitessa	1975	1976	DC
9	Armando Messina	1976	1978	DC
10	Franco Borgia	1978	1980	PSI
11	Michele Frezza	1980	1983	PSI
12	Gabriele Lionetti	1983	1983	DC
13	Renato Russo	1983	1984	DC
14	Aldo Bernardini	1984	1985	DC
15	Sabino Carpagnano	1985	1986	PSI
(12)	Gabriele Lionetti	1986	1988	DC
16	Nicola Larosa	1988	1989	DC
17	Pino Dicuonzo	1989	1990	PSI
18	Raffaele Grimaldi	1990	1992	DC
19	Sebastiano Lavecchia	1992	1992	DC
20	Anna Chiumeo	1992	1993	DC
(18)	Raffaele Grimaldi	1993	1994	DC

=== Direct election (since 1994) ===
Since 1994, under provisions of new local administration law, the mayor of Barletta is chosen by direct election, originally every four, then every five years.

	Mayor	Term start	Term end	Party	Coalition	Election
21	Raffaele Fiore	27 June 1994	6 February 1996 (Note: Resigned.)	PPI	PDS • PdD • PPI • PSI	1994
Special Prefectural Commissioner's tenure (6 February 1996 – 24 June 1996)
22	Ruggero Dimiccoli	24 June 1996	10 June 1997 (Note: Resigned.)	Ind	PDS • PPI • PRC • CS	1996
Special Prefectural Commissioner's tenure (10 June 1997 – 4 December 1997)
23	Francesco Salerno	4 December 1997	28 May 2002	PDS; DS	PDS • PPI • PRC • RI • SDI	1997
23	Francesco Salerno	28 May 2002	31 May 2005 (Note: Resigned.)	PDS; DS	DS • SDI • PRC	2002
Special Prefectural Commissioner's tenure (31 May 2005 – 30 May 2006)
24	Nicola Maffei	30 May 2006	21 May 2011	DL; PD	DS • DL • SDI • FdV • RnP	2006
24	Nicola Maffei	21 May 2011	30 October 2012 (Note: Ousted from office after the majority of the members of the City Council resigned.)	DL; PD	PD • PSI • FdS • SEL • IdV	2011
Special Prefectural Commissioner's tenure (30 October 2012 – 12 June 2013)
25	Pasquale Cascella	12 June 2013	7 May 2018 (Note: Resigned.)	PD	PD • SEL	2013
Special Prefectural Commissioner's tenure (7 May 2018 – 15 June 2018)
26	Cosimo Cannito	15 June 2018	13 October 2021 (Note: Removed from office after the City Council passed a motion of no confidence against him.)	Ind	AP • FI • NcI	2018
Special Prefectural Commissioner tenure (13 October 2021 – 29 June 2022)
(26)	Cosimo Cannito	29 June 2022	Incumbent	Ind	FdI • FI • Lega	2022

== Bibliography ==
- "Storia politica: sindaci di Barletta dal '90 ad oggi". Barletta Viva (in Italian). 1 February 2013.
