= Freedom (electoral list) =

Freedom Libertà
- Leader: Cateno De Luca
- Founded: 7 March 2024
- Ideology: Populism; Regionalism; Federalism; Soft Euroscepticism
- Political position: Big tent
- Colours: Teal
- Chamber of Deputies: 1 / 400
- Senate: 0 / 200
- European Parliament: 0 / 76

Freedom (Italian: Libertà), sometimes referred to as the Freedom Front (Italian: Fronte della Libertà), is a populist electoral list in Italy founded by Cateno De Luca, mayor of Taormina. The list, which includes several regionalist, Eurosceptic, and populist minor parties, was launched in March 2024 in Rome, with the aim of taking part in the 2024 European Parliament election in Italy.

== History ==
Freedom was officially launched by Cateno De Luca and former minister Roberto Castelli on 7 March 2024. On 31 March 2024, the Northern People's Party, led by Castelli, which was the first party to join the coalition, left the coalition, officially due to possible legal problems between a list within the list and another political force with the same name, Italexit, which accused of using its name improperly.

After weeks of close negotiations, an agreement with Sovereign and Popular Democracy (DSP) also fell through on 15 March 2024. The anti-establishment and Eurosceptic party led by Marco Rizzo refused the alliance due to disagreements with De Luca and the presence of some autonomist lists in the coalition. At the same time, Independence, a sovereignist and Eurosceptic movement led by Gianni Alemanno, also decided not to join the coalition. Alemanno labeled De Luca's proposal as "too moderate on European Union and neoliberalism".

Cateno De Luca defined the result of the European Elections as "disappointing", subsequently declaring that he wanted to concentrate on Sicily where he received the majority of the preference votes and declaring himself in favor of the primaries for a hypothetical united opposition front to the Center-Right with the forces of Centre-left, effectively putting an unofficial end to the electoral experience of the list.

The list obtained a mere 1.22% by not electing any deputies.

== Composition ==
Parties	Main ideology	Leader(s)
South calls North (ScN)	Regionalism	Cateno De Luca
The People of the Family (PdF)	Christian right	Mario Adinolfi
Vita (V)	Anti-establishment	Sara Cunial
Great North (GN)	Separatism	Roberto Bernardelli
Sicilia Vera (SV)	Regionalism	Giuseppe Lombardo
Green Front (FV)	Green politics	Vincenzo Galizia
Valdostan Rally (RV)	Regionalism	Stefano Aggravi
Civics in Movement (CiM)	Conservatism	Sergio Pirozzi
Movement for Italexit (MpI)	Euroscepticism	Giampaolo Bocci
Venetian People (PV)	Venetian nationalism	Vito Comencini
Moderate Party of Italy (PMDI)	Centrism	Paolo Silvagni
Free Together (IL)	Anti-establishment	Ugo Rossi
Us Farmers & Fishers (NA&P)	Agrarianism	Mauro Beccari
Sovereignty (S)	Euroscepticism	Marco Mori
Pensioners' Party + Health (PP+S)	Pensioners' interests	Giacinto Boldrini
Capitano Ultimo (CU)	Big tent	Sergio De Caprio
Rizzi (R)	Animal rights	Enrico Rizzi
True North (VN)	Regionalism	several
Us Free Vendors (NAL)	Vendors' interests	several

== Leadership ==
=== Leader ===
- Cateno De Luca (2024–present)

== Election results ==
=== European Parliament ===
Election	Leader	Votes	%	Seats	+/–	EP Group
2024	Cateno De Luca	285,800 (10th)	1.22	0 / 76	New	–
