= Francesco Gallo (politician) =

Italian politician (born 1966)

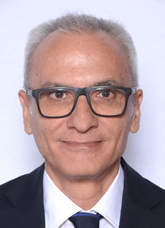
- Gallo in 2022

Member of the Chamber of Deputies
- Incumbent
- Assumed office 13 October 2022
- Constituency: Sicily 2 – U06

Personal details
- Born: 3 November 1966 (age 59)
- Party: South calls North (since 2022)

Francesco Gallo (born 3 November 1966) is an Italian politician serving as a member of the Chamber of Deputies since 2022. From June to October 2022, he served as deputy mayor of Messina.
