= 2022 Sicilian regional election =

- 25 September 2022

All 70 seats to the Sicilian Regional Assembly 36 seats needed for a majority
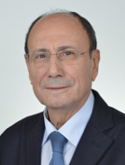

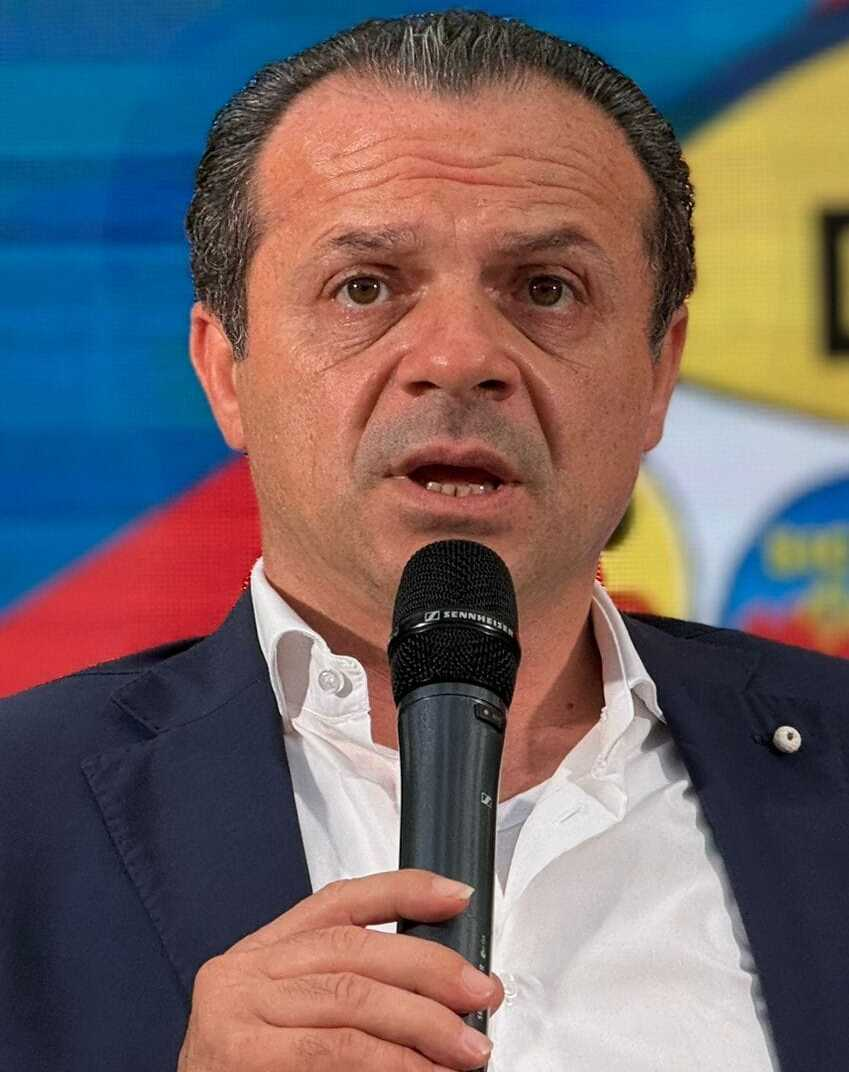

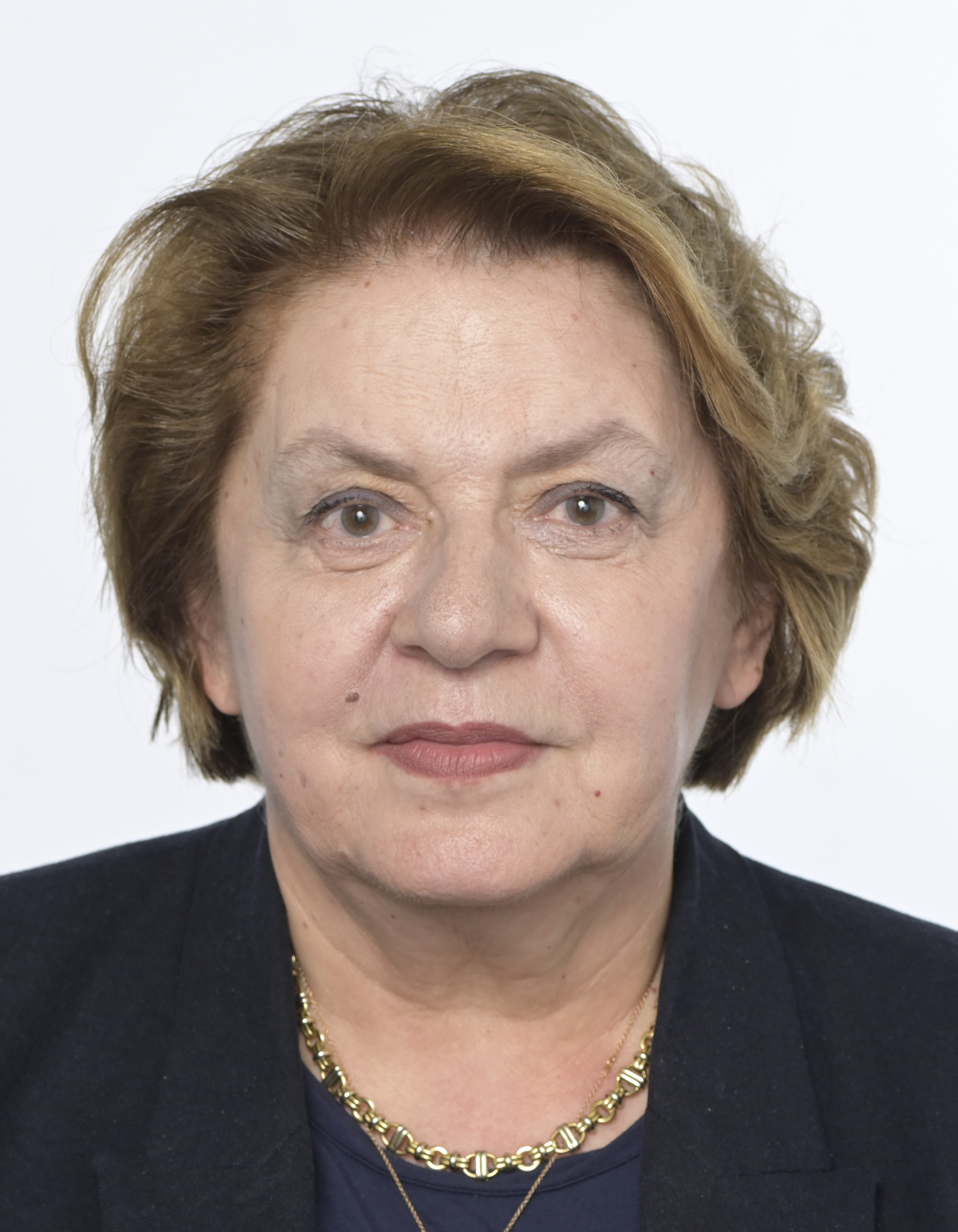

	First party	Second party
Leader	Renato Schifani	Cateno De Luca
Party	Forza Italia	South calls North
Alliance	Centre-right	–
Seats won	40	8
Seat change	▲4	New
Popular vote	887,215	505,386
Percentage	42.05%	23.95%
Swing	▲3.10%	New
	Third party	Fourth party
Leader	Caterina Chinnici	Nuccio Di Paola
Party	Democratic Party	Five Star Movement
Alliance	Centre-left	–
Seats won	11	11
Seat change	▼2	▼9
Popular vote	341,252	321,142
Percentage	16.17%	15.22%
Swing	▼2.48%	▼19.43%
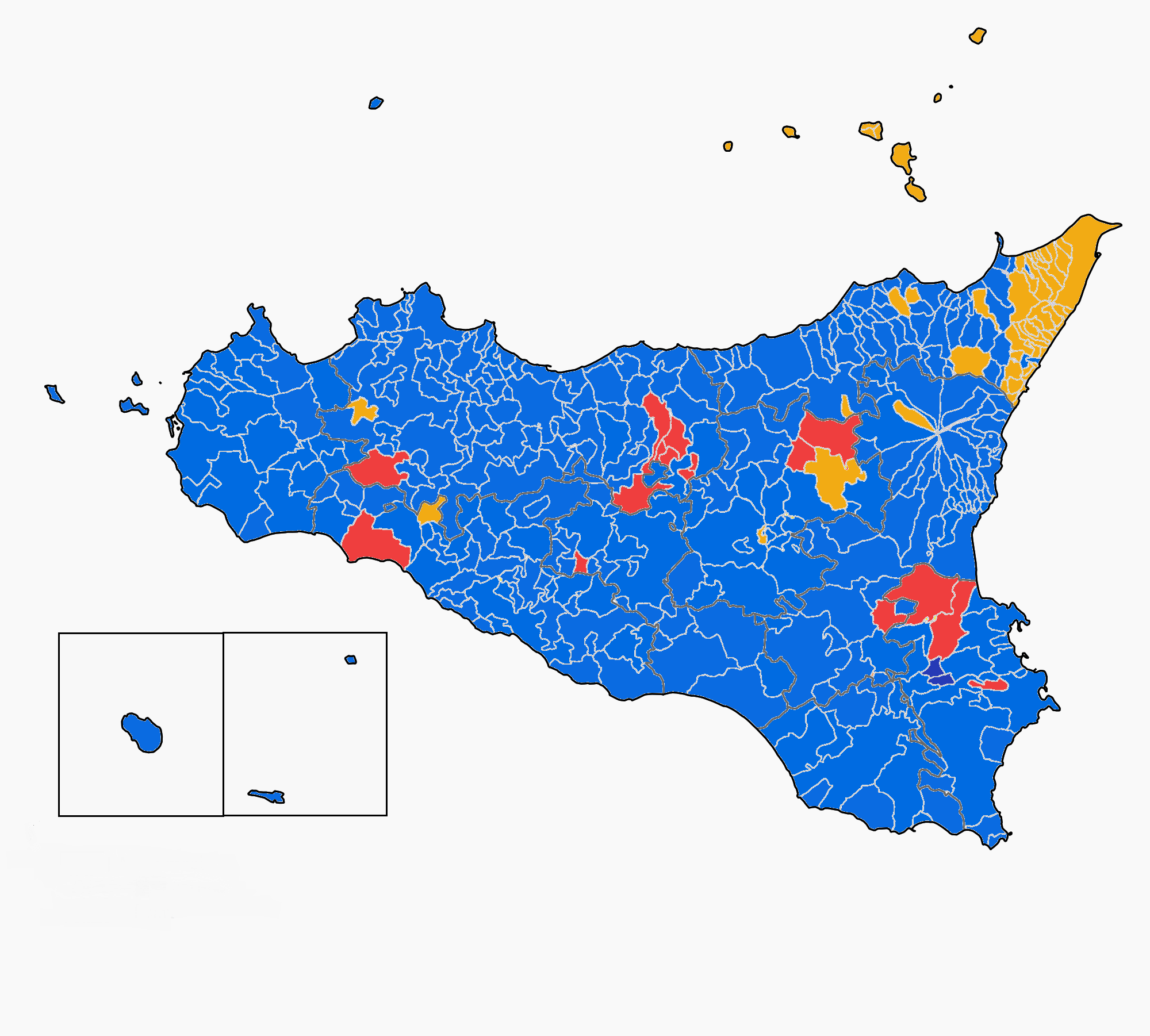
President before election
Nello Musumeci
DB
Elected President
Renato Schifani
FI

The 2022 Sicilian regional election for the renewal of the Sicilian Regional Assembly and the election of the President of Sicily were held on 25 September, 2022. Renato Schifani, candidate of the centre-right coalition, easily won the election, becoming the next president of the region.

== Electoral system ==
The Sicilian Parliament is elected with a mixed system: 62 MPs are chosen with a form of proportional representation using a largest remainder method with open lists and a 5% threshold, while 8 MPs (7+1) are elected using Party bloc vote.

AG	CL	CT	EN	ME	PA	RG	SR	TP	Total
6	3	13	2	8	16	4	5	5	62

== Background ==
=== Progressive camp primary election ===
On 18 June a press conference was held between the leaders of Democratic Party, Five Star Movement, Italian Left, Green Europe, Article One, Italian Socialist Party and One Hundred Steps for Sicily. They presented the guidelines for the Progressive camp primary election, which was held on 23 July. The deadline for the candidacies was set for June 30. Caterina Chinnici won the primary election with 44% of votes, ahead of Barbara Floridia (32%) and Claudio Fava (23%).

Candidate	Party	Votes	%	Notes
Caterina Chinnici	Democratic Party	14,552	44.77%	
Barbara Floridia	Five Star Movement	10,317	31.74%	
Claudio Fava	One Hundred Steps for Sicily	7,547	23.22%	
Total			100%	

== Parties and candidates ==
Below is a list of the parties and their respective leaders in the election.

Political party or alliance	Constituent lists	Previous result		Candidate	Ref.
Political party or alliance	Constituent lists	Votes (%)	Seats	Candidate	Ref.
Centre-right coalition	Forza Italia	16.4	12	Renato Schifani	
Centre-right coalition	Populars and Autonomists – Us With Sicily	7.1	5	Renato Schifani	
Centre-right coalition	Brothers of Italy (incl. DB)	5.6	3	Renato Schifani	
Centre-right coalition	Italy First – League	5.6	3	Renato Schifani	
Centre-right coalition	Christian Democracy (incl. UDC)	—N/a	—N/a	Renato Schifani	
Five Star Movement		26.7	19	Nuccio Di Paola	
Centre-left coalition	Democratic Party (incl. PSI)	13.0	11	Caterina Chinnici	
Centre-left coalition	One Hundred Steps for Sicily (incl. Art.1, SI and EV)	5.2	1	Caterina Chinnici	
Free Sicilians		0.7	–	Eliana Esposito	
Action – Italia Viva (incl. Together and PSS)		—N/a	—N/a	Gaetano Armao	
De Luca's coalition	South calls North	—N/a	—N/a	Cateno De Luca	
De Luca's coalition	Sicilia Vera	—N/a	—N/a	Cateno De Luca	

== Opinion polling ==
=== Candidates ===
Exit poll

Date	Polling firm	Sample size	Schifani	Di Paola	Chinnici	De Luca	Armao	Others	Lead
25 Sep 2022	Opinio	–	37–41	13–17	15.5–19.5	24–28	1.5–3.5	1.5–3.5	13.0
1–8 Sep 2022	SWG	1,800	33–37	10–14	17–21	26–30	1–3	2–6	7.0
7 Sep 2022	Noto	1,000	41.0	15.0	25.0	12.0	4.0	2.0	16.0
2–6 Sep 2022	Ipsos	1,200	28.7	19.5	22.1	23.5	4.6	1.6	5.2
1–3 Sep 2022	Tecnè	2,000	37–41	11–15	25–29	13–17	3–5	2–3	12.0
26–29 Aug 2022	Tecnè	2,000	38–42	8–12	27–31	12–16	3–5	2–4	11.0

==== Hypothetical candidates ====
Date	Polling firm	Musumeci	Cancelleri	Micari	Fava	De Luca	No-one	Lead
26 Jun 2021	Keix	26.1	22.1	6.0	13.2	—N/a	31.0	4.0
26 Jun 2021	Keix	28.1	27.1	—N/a	—N/a	—N/a	44.8	1.0
26 Jun 2021	Keix	24.2	21.1	—N/a	—N/a	13.8	40.9	3.1
26 Jun 2021	Keix	23.6	—N/a	—N/a	21.1	14.6	TBA	2.5
26 Jun 2021	Keix	28.5	—N/a	—N/a	25.4	—N/a	TBA	3.1

=== Parties ===
Date	Polling firm	Sample size	CDX								M5S	CSX						IV	A	+E	Others	Lead
Date	Polling firm	Sample size	FI	MpA/NcI	UDC–CP–IS	#DB	FdI	Lega	CI	Other	M5S	PD	CPpS	Art.1	SI	EV	Other	IV	A	+E	Others	Lead
9–14 March 2022	Keix	1,920	10.3	0.6	1.6	6.8	15.4	7.8	—N/a	—N/a	22.9	9.8	2.6			—N/a	—N/a	3.3	0.6	—N/a	—N/a	7.5
16 February 2022	Demopolis	—N/a	14.0	—N/a	—N/a	—N/a	26.0	9.0	—N/a	—N/a	21.0	18.2	—N/a			—N/a	—N/a	—N/a	—N/a	—N/a	11.8	5.0
23 December 2021	Noto	—N/a	11	3.5	—N/a	9	15	8	1	3.5	15.0	17.0	2.5			2.0	2.0	2	1.5	1.5	5.0	2.0
26 June 2021	Keix	—N/a	9.2	2.5	3.5	8.1	13.7	10.5	—N/a	—N/a	22.7	13.9	4.4	3.1	0.7	—N/a	—N/a	4.2	3.1	—N/a	—N/a	9.0

== Results ==
Candidates	Votes	%	Seats	Parties	Votes	%	Seats
Renato Schifani	887,215	42.05	7				
Renato Schifani	887,215	42.05	7	Brothers of Italy	282,345	15.10	11
Renato Schifani	887,215	42.05	7	Forza Italia	275,736	14.75	11
Renato Schifani	887,215	42.05	7	Italy First – League	127,454	6.80	4
Renato Schifani	887,215	42.05	7	Populars and Autonomists	127,096	6.80	3
Renato Schifani	887,215	42.05	7	Christian Democracy	121,691	6.51	4
Renato Schifani	887,215	42.05	7	Total	934,322	49.96	33
Cateno De Luca	505,386	23.95	1				
Cateno De Luca	505,386	23.95	1	South calls North	254,453	13.61	7
Cateno De Luca	505,386	23.95	1	Sicilia Vera	50,877	2.72	–
Cateno De Luca	505,386	23.95	1	Sicilian Pride	18,165	0.97	–
Cateno De Luca	505,386	23.95	1	Land of Love	3,390	0.18	–
Cateno De Luca	505,386	23.95	1	Young Sicilians	3,042	0.16	–
Cateno De Luca	505,386	23.95	1	Sicilian Autonomy	3,042	0.16	–
Cateno De Luca	505,386	23.95	1	Sicily Feat	2,702	0.14	–
Cateno De Luca	505,386	23.95	1	Work in Sicily	1,793	0.10	–
Cateno De Luca	505,386	23.95	1	Enough Mafias	1,356	0.07	–
Cateno De Luca	505,386	23.95	1	Total	336,390	18.11	7
Caterina Chinnici	341,252	16.17	–				
Caterina Chinnici	341,252	16.17	–	Democratic Party	238,761	12.77	11
Caterina Chinnici	341,252	16.17	–	One Hundred Steps for Sicily	55,599	2.97	–
Caterina Chinnici	341,252	16.17	–	Total	294,360	15.74	11
Nuccio di Paola	321,142	15.22	–	Five Star Movement	254,974	13.64	11
Gaetano Armao	43,835	2.08	–	Action – Italia Viva	39,788	2.13	–
Eliana Esposito	10,973	0.52	–	Free Sicilians	7,654	0.41	–
Blank and invalid votes	140,596	6.25					
Total candidates	2,250,399	100.00	8	Total parties	1,869,863	100.00	62
Registered voters/turnout	4,609,984	48.82					
Source: Regione Sicilia

Popular vote
FdI	15.10%
FI	14.75%
M5S	13.64%
ScN	13.61%
PD	12.77%
Lega	6.80%
PeA	6.80%
DC	6.51%
CPpS	2.97%
SV	2.72%
A–IV	2.13%

President
Schifani	42.05%
De Luca	23.95%
Chinnici	16.17%
Di Paola	15.22%
Armao	2.08%
Esposito	0.52%
