= Dafne Musolino =

Italian politician (born 1974)

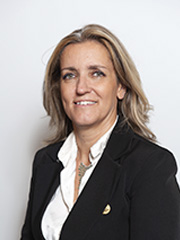
- Musolino in 2022

Member of the Senate
- Incumbent
- Assumed office 13 October 2022
- Constituency: Sicily – U06

Personal details
- Born: 4 December 1974 (age 51)
- Party: Italia Viva (since 2023)

Dafne Musolino (born 4 December 1974) is an Italian politician serving as a member of the Senate since 2022. From 2018 to 2022, she was an assessor of Messina.
