= South calls North =

South calls North Sud chiama Nord
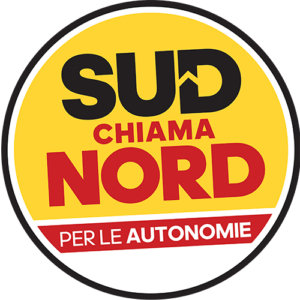
- Leader: Cateno De Luca
- President: Laura Castelli
- Founded: 25 June 2022
- Headquarters: Via Oratorio San Francesco 5, Messina
- Membership (2024): 14,000
- Ideology: Regionalism; Populism; Autonomism
- Political position: Big tent
- National affiliation: Freedom (2024); Centre-right coalition (2026–present)
- Colours: Yellow Red
- Chamber of Deputies: 1 / 400
- Senate: 0 / 205
- European Parliament: 0 / 76
- Sicilian Assembly: 4 / 70

Website
- sud-chiamanord.it

South calls North (Italian: Sud chiama Nord, ScN) is a regionalist and populist political party in Italy, based in Sicily and led by former mayor of Messina Cateno De Luca.

== History ==
In 2007, Cateno De Luca, a former Christian Democrat who had been a member of the Christian Democratic Centre (1994–2002), the Union of the Centre (2002–2005), and the Movement for Autonomy (2005–2008), formed Sicilia Vera, which soon became an independent party. In June 2022, in the run-up to the 2022 Sicilian regional election, De Luca, along with former Five Star Movement (M5S) MEP Dino Giarrusso, launched ScN as a broader political vehicle than Sicilia Vera. However, after a few weeks, Giarrusso left the party due to conflicts with De Luca with regard to the party's candidatures in the following election and De Luca remained the sole leader.

ScN took part in the 2022 Italian general election, winning one single-member constituency in the Chamber of Deputies with Francesco Gallo, and one in the Senate of the Republic with Dafne Musolino, both from the districts of Messina, where ScN was capable to collect more than 30% of votes. Contextually, De Luca came second in the 2022 Sicilian regional election, with 24.0% of the vote, behind the centre-right coalition candidate Renato Schifani, while the affiliated party lists obtained 18.1%, electing eight members of the Sicilian Regional Assembly; upon the formation of parliamentary groups, four councillors elected with ScN formed a distinct parliamentary group named Sicilia Vera, De Luca's other party.

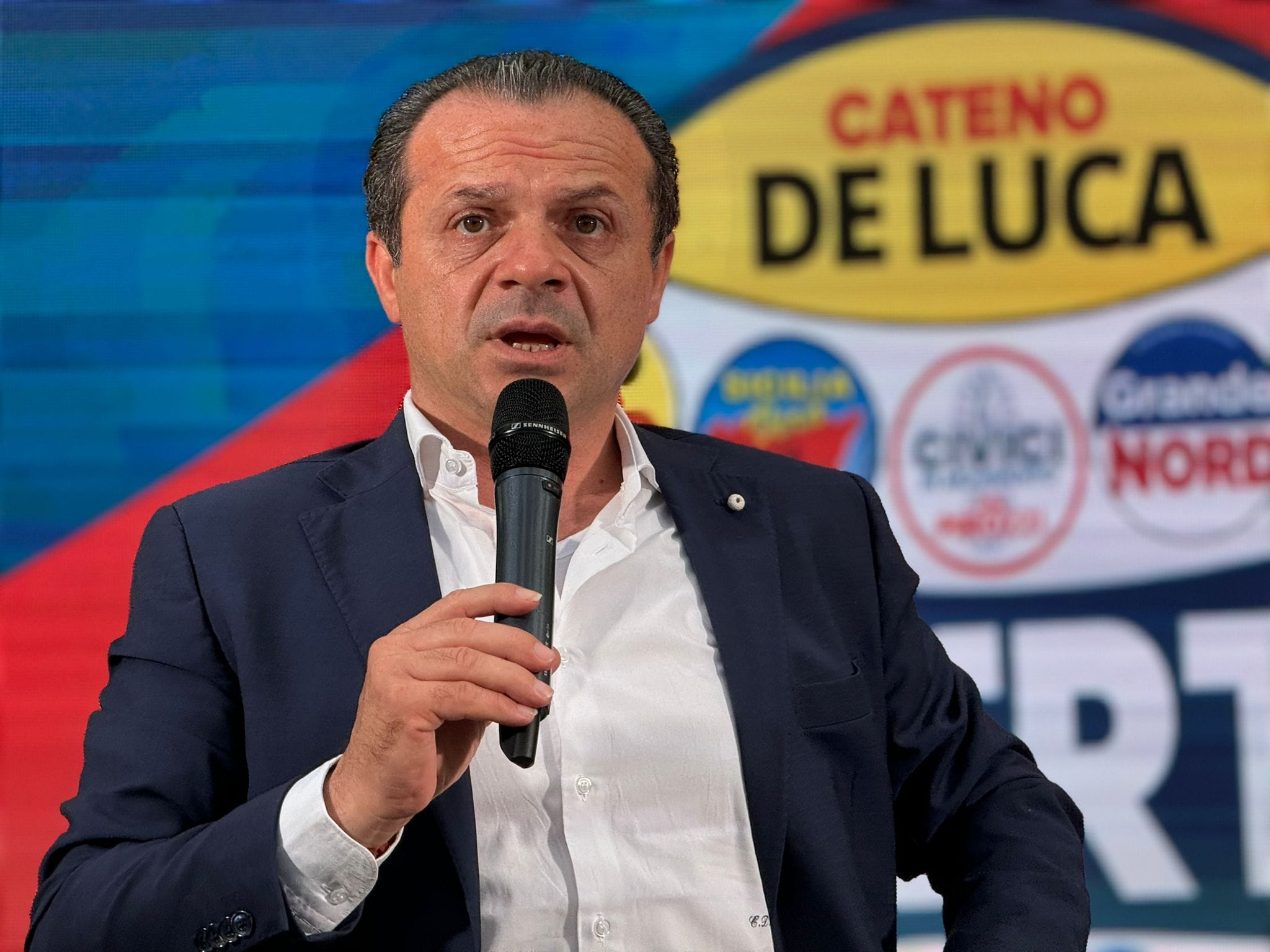
Cateno De Luca in 2024

In March 2023, Laura Castelli, a former leading member of the M5S joined the party, becoming its spokesperson. In January 2024, Castelli was appointed president of the party. In September 2023, senator Musolino left the party in order to join Matteo Renzi's Italia Viva. In 2024, the party signed a deal with Franco Cuccureddu, a former member of the Movement for Autonomy (MpA), who became the party's representative in Sardinia. Cuccureddu's list, named Shared Horizon (OC), run in the 2024 Sardinian regional election within the centre-left coalition, gaining three seats. In March 2024, De Luca launched Freedom, a populist electoral list with several regionalist and anti-establishment minor parties, with the aim of taking part in the 2024 European Parliament election in Italy.

On 10 October 2026, De Luca announced that ScN joined the centre-right coalition for next Italian general election. On 12 October, Francesco Gallo, Manlio Messina and Luca Sbardella formed a new autonomous sub-group of the Mixed Group. From 27 to 29 October, a convention held in Rome formalized an electoral alliance between ScN and Mayors of Italy (SdI), a new civic movement founded by Ernesto Magorno together with local administrators from centrist and centre-right parties, with the aim of taking part in the next Italian general election.

== Ideology ==
The party has been described as regionalist, autonomist, and populist. ScN also supports federalism, advocating for a greater administrative decentralisation, and greater decision-making power for local administrators. Moreover, the party is in favor of increasing the powers of the Prime Minister of Italy, comparing this position to a "mayor of Italy", as it is clearly shown in the party's logo under the slogan "De Luca for Mayor of Italy".

== Election results ==
=== Italian Parliament ===
Election	Leader	Chamber of Deputies					Senate of the Republic				
Election	Leader	Votes	%	Seats	+/–	Position	Votes	%	Seats	+/–	Position
2022	Cateno De Luca	212,685	0.76	1 / 400	New	13th	272,462	1.0	1 / 200	New	13th

=== European Parliament ===
Election	Leader	Votes	%	Seats	+/–	EP Group
2024	Cateno De Luca	Into Freedom		0 / 76	New	–

=== Regional Councils ===
Region	Election	Candidate	Votes	%	Seats	+/–
Sicily	2022	Cateno De Luca	254,453	13.61	8 / 70	New
Piedmont	2024	Alberto Costanzo	Into Freedom		0 / 51	New
Calabria	2025 (Note: In a joint list with Italian Animalist Party)	Roberto Occhiuto	1,527	0.20	0 / 31	New

== Symbols ==
2022 general election

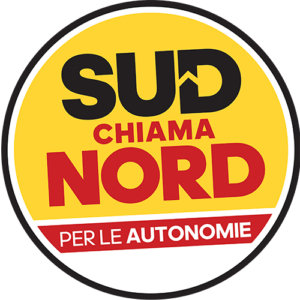
2022–present

== Leadership ==
- Secretary: Dino Giarrusso (2022), Cateno De Luca (2022–present)
- Coordinator: Cateno De Luca (2022)
- President: Ismaele La Vardera (2022–2024), Laura Castelli (2024–present)
- Spokesperson: Laura Castelli (2023–2024)

== See also ==
- Sicilia Vera
