= Dino Giarrusso =

Italian television personality and politician

Dino Giarrusso MEP
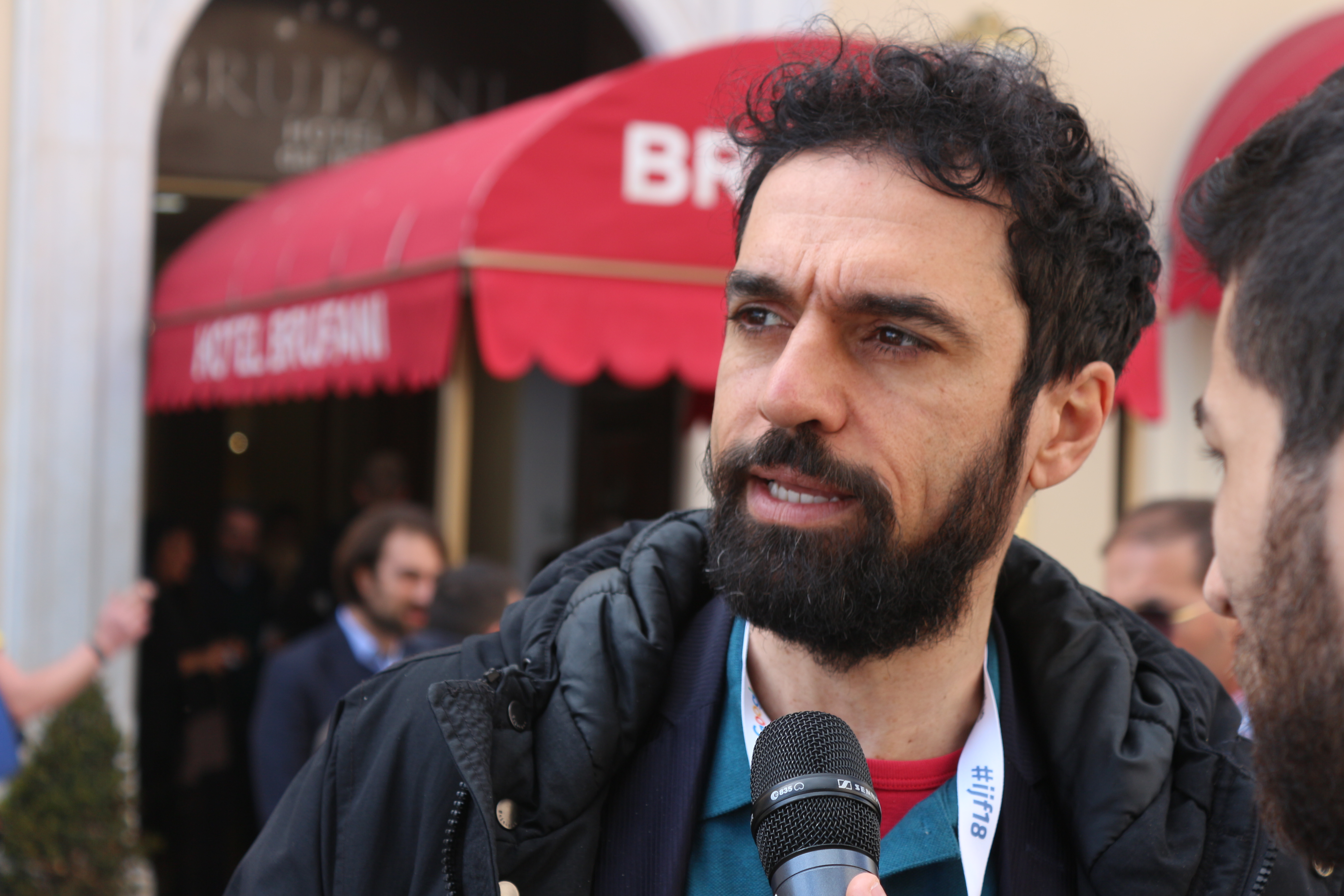

Member of the European Parliament for Italian Islands
- Incumbent
- Assumed office 2 July 2019

Personal details
- Born: 11 September 1974 (age 52) Catania, Italy
- Party: M5S (2018–2022); ScN (2022)
- Education: University of Siena
- Occupation: Politician, TV correspondent, journalist, actor

Dino Riccardo Maria Giarrusso (born 11 September 1974) is an Italian television personality and politician.

== Biography ==
Giarrusso was born on 11 September 1974 in Catania, Sicily. In 1997, he graduated in Communication Sciences at the University of Siena; he worked as a journalist, collaborating with La Repubblica and L'Unità, as well as a television author for local Sicilian newspapers. He also shot various commercials and documentaries, always relating to his homeland, and was assistant director of Ettore Scola, Marco Risi and Ricky Tognazzi. Giarrusso also played some minor roles in Italian TV series.

From 2014 to 2018, he worked as a correspondent for the TV programme Le Iene, broadcast on Italia 1.

In 2019, he was elected as an MEP in the European Parliament election, resulting, with 117,211 preference votes, the most voted candidate of the Five Star Movement.

He considers himself Roman Catholic.
