= Trinacria =

Trinacria may refer to:

- the ancient name of Sicily
  - Sicily in the classical Greek period; see History of Greek and Hellenistic Sicily
  - Name for the Kingdom of Sicily during the 1300s
  - Name for the emblem of Sicily (the triskeles with the Gorgoneion Medusa); see Triskelion § Sicily
    - A nickname of the modern flag of Sicily
- Trinacria (bivalve), a genus of bivalves in the family Noetiidae
- Trinacria (diatom), a genus of diatoms
- Trinacria, a noise/death metal band which is a side project for members of Enslaved

== See also ==
- Three valli of Sicily
- Three-finger salute (Sicilian)
- Thrinacia, the Homeric island of Helios' cattle
