= Concetto Gallo =

Italian politician

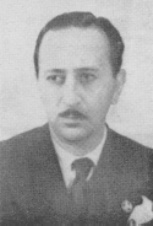
Concetto Gallo

Concetto Gallo (11 January 1913 – 1 April 1980) was a Sicilian politician who formed part of the Sicilian nationalist movement. He was one of the most popular leaders of Sicilian Separatism.

Gallo was born in Catania, Sicily, and represented the Movement for the Independence of Sicily (MIS) in the Constituent Assembly of Italy from 1946 to 1948.

== Life ==
He was the son of lawyer Salvatore Gallo Poggi. His father was a well-known lawyer. Even if he was young, Concetto Gallo was well known for his skills as a great athlete. But in addition to being a sportsman, as well as a boy appreciated in the Catania of those years, Concetto was also a dreamer. And he was in love with his land and his freedom. At a very young age he joined Separatism and was immediately attracted by the magnetic figure of Antonio Canepa, a university professor in Catania and leader of the popular current of Sicilian Independentism.

In August 1943, he participated in the establishment of the Movement for the Independence of Sicily, of which he soon became one of the leaders, together with Antonio Canepa, of those who supported a clandestine armed struggle. In August 1945, after Canepa's death, Gallo was put in charge of EVIS, the so-called separatist army of Sicily, under the pseudonym Second Turri. It was then that the bandit Salvatore Giuliano was appointed lieutenant colonel of EVIS.

When in June 1946 he was elected a deputy to the Constituent Assembly on the MIS list, he was released from prison on 1 July. In September 1946, authorization was requested to proceed against him as "responsible for armed insurrection against the state", for the murder of a non-commissioned officer of the Carabinieri and the wounding of other soldiers of the Arma. The Chamber granted authorization, but denied the arrest. In April 1947 he was elected deputy to the Sicilian regional assembly . In 1951 he re-nominated for the MIS at Ars but was not re-elected.
