= Flag of Sicily =

Sicily
- Trinacria
- Use: Civil and state flag
- Proportion: 13:20 (as shown above), 2:3 or 3:5
- Adopted: 4 January 2000
- Design: Divided diagonally from the upper hoist-side corner; the upper triangle is red and the lower triangle is yellow; in the center is the Sicilian triskelion featuring the winged head of Medusa with three ears of wheat protruding from it.

The flag of Sicily (Note: Sicilian: bannera dâ Sicilia; Italian: bandiera della Sicilia) shows a triskeles symbol (a figure of three legs arranged in rotational symmetry), and at its center a Gorgoneion (depiction of the head of Medusa) with a pair of wings and three wheat ears. In the original flag, the wheat ears did not exist and the colors were reversed. The original flag was created in 1282 during the rebellion of the Sicilian Vespers.

== Description ==
The flag is characterized by the presence of the triskeles in its middle formed by the winged head of a woman (Hybla, goddess of fertility among the ancient Sicilian people), head topped with a knot of snakes and three wheat ears, from which three bent legs radiate, as if seized in mid-race, representing the extreme fertility of the land of Sicily. The triskelion symbol is said to represent the three capes (headlands or promontories of the island of Sicily), namely: Pelorus (Peloro, Tip of Faro, Messina: North-East); Pachynus (Passero, Syracuse: South); and Lilybæum (Lilibeo, Cape Boeo, Marsala: West), which form three points of a triangle from the historical three valli of the island.

The flag is bisected diagonally into regions coloured red and yellow. Those colours were first adopted after the revolution of the Sicilian Vespers in order to symbolise loyalty to the Aragonese party.

== History ==
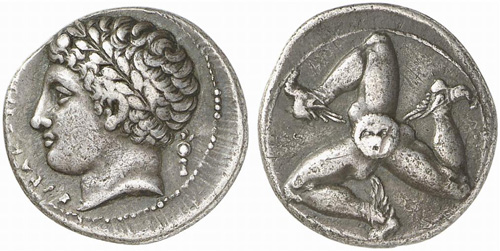
Silver drachma from Sicily, minted during the reign of Agathocles, tyrant of Syracuse (r. 317–289 BC) and king of Sicily (r. 304–289 BC), with a triskeles of three human legs with winged feet, and a Gorgoneion at their center

The Triskeles-with-Gorgoneion symbol is found in antiquity, depicted on coins minted in Syracuse in the 4th century BC. The emblem was included in the design of the Army Gold Medal awarded to British Army majors and above who had taken a key part in the Battle of Maida (1806). It was used in combination with the Italian tricolore in the Sicilian revolution of 1848. It was at this time referred to as "the sign of the Trinacria", Sicily being referred to by its ancient name, Trinacria ("having three headlands"). The name had been revived during the Aragonese period of the Kingdom of Sicily following the Vespers (1282). Apparently from this use, Trinacria came to be re-interpreted as a name for the symbol itself.

The diagonal division in red and yellow goes back to 1943 when it was used by the separatist movement led by Andrea Finocchiaro Aprile.

The addition of a pair of wings to the head of the Gorgon is modern (1848), the three ears of corn were added in the 1940s.

A gonfalon combining the coats of arms of Norman Sicily, the Hohenstaufen emperors, and the Aragonese kingdom of Sicily with the triskeles emblem was adopted by the Sicilian Regional Assembly in 1990. The present design became the official public flag of the Autonomous Region of Sicily on 4 January 2000, after the passing of an apposite law which advocates its use on public buildings, schools, city halls, and all the other places in which Sicily is represented.

=== Kingdom of Sicily ===
The Kingdom of Sicily was a state that existed in the south of the Italian Peninsula and for a time the region of Ifriqiya from its founding by Roger II of Sicily in 1130 until 1816. It was a successor state of the County of Sicily, which had been founded in 1071 during the Norman conquest of the southern peninsula.

==== First flag ====
Banner of Manfred, King of Sicily (r. 1258–1266)

Manfred, King of Sicily, crowned King of Sicily in 1258, changed the field of the coat of arms of Hohenstaufen family from gold to silver. In 1266 Manfred was killed in the Battle of Benevento, and Sicily was occupied by the French under the command of Charles of Anjou. The banner was lowered, but the black eagle from Swabia on a white background appeared on Sicilian flags for centuries.

==== Second flag ====
Banner of Charles I of Anjou (r. 1266–1282/5)

Charles I used the standard of the House of Anjou. The Angevins lost power on the island after the revolt of the Sicilian Vespers in 1282. Thereafter the old Kingdom of Sicily was centered on the mainland, with its capital at Naples, and although informally called 'Kingdom of Naples' it was still known formally as 'Kingdom of Sicily'. Thus, there were two "Sicilies" – the island kingdom, however, was often called "Sicily beyond the Lighthouse" or "Trinacria", by terms of a treaty between the two states.

==== Third flag ====
Kingdom of Sicily (1282–1296)

The next king of Sicily island was Peter III of Aragon of the House of Barcelona. Since Peter III was Manfred's son-in-law, he restored the coat of arms with the black eagle and added four red stripes on a yellow background from his own coat of arms. Until 1296, the coat of arms and the banner derived from it were usually quartered.

==== Fourth flag ====
1296 – 17th century

In 1296, the quartering of the Swabian and Aragonese arms was changed to the Saint Andrew's cross, with stripes at the top and bottom, and with eagles on the right and left. The function of the flag also changed gradually: initially it was a banner of war later it became a flag raised by Sicilian merchant ships. Perhaps by mistake, due to its rather complicated design, this flag was often depicted with shoulder positions swapped (eagles up and down and stripes right and left).

==== Fifth flag ====
17th century – c. 1800

In the 17th century, the design was significantly simplified: the white fabric was crossed by four horizontal stripes alternating red and yellow, above and below two small black eagles (in a more modern style). The flag probably survived until 1800 – or at least no later than October 2, 1817, when the Sicilian flags were abolished – though it continued to appear on the cards for many years. The logo of the separatist party "Free Sicilians" alludes to this flag.

=== Royal Sicilian Regiment ===
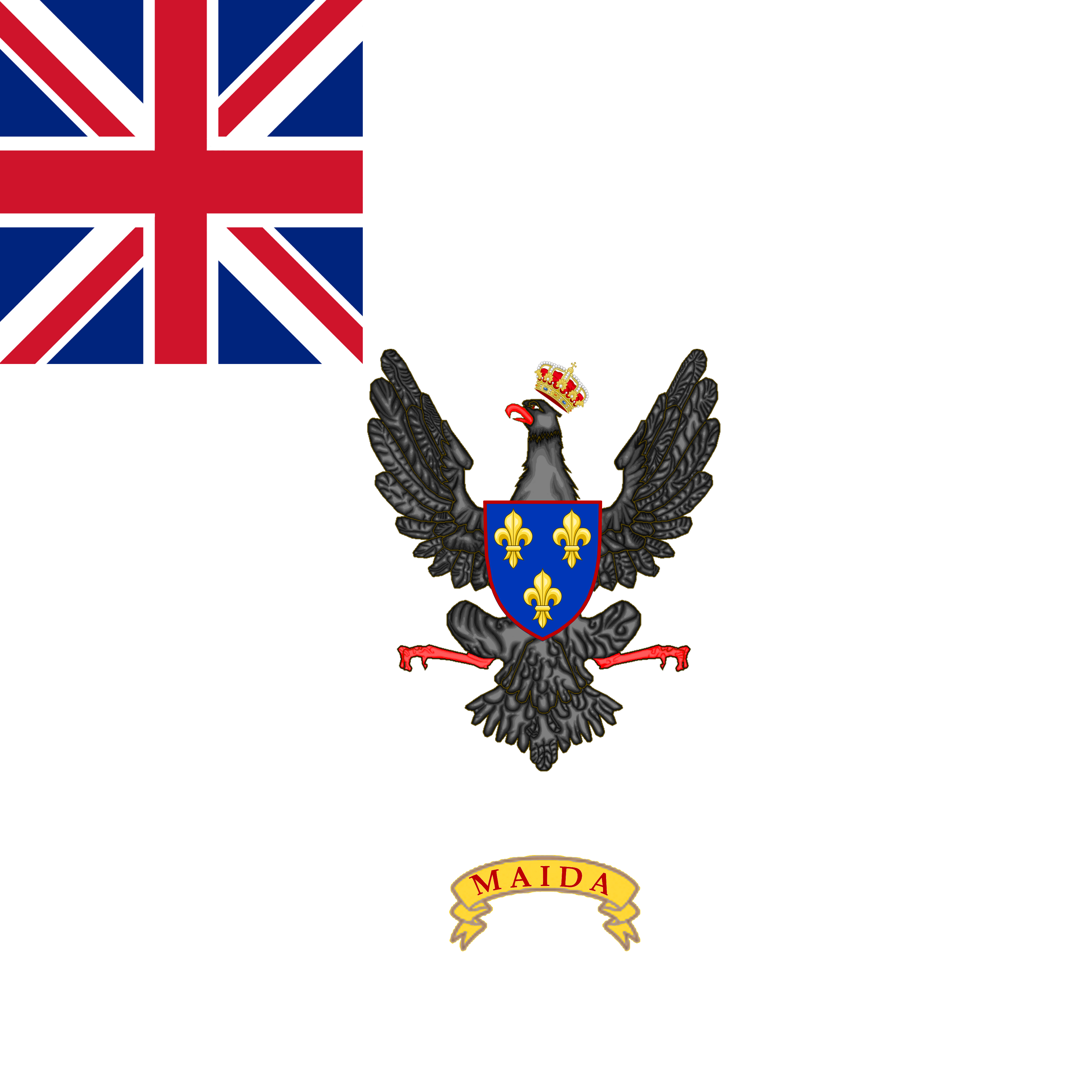
Regimental Colours of the Royal Sicilian Regiment, reconstructed on the extant description of the flag

The Royal Sicilian Regiment was a light infantry regiment recruited from Sicily that served with the British Army during the Napoleonic Wars, from 1806 to its disbandment in 1816.

=== Modern ===
==== Sicilian revolution ====
Flag of the Sicilian revolution of 1848

On 27 May 1848, Trinacria, a symbol of freedom in the pre-Roman period and during the uprising of Vespers, was placed at the center of the Italian tricolor and was adopted by the Sicilian Parliament as the symbolic flag of the island.

==== Separatist movement ====
After Operation Husky, Sicilian separatists created two organizations: party MIS and paramilitary Voluntary Army for the Independence of Sicily (EVIS)^{it}.

===== Vespro flag =====
Flag of the Movement for the Independence of Sicily (1945)

The "vespro flag" used by separatist movements in the 1940s

The first MIS flag closely resembled the current flag of Sicily, although it had many variants. MIS stopped using it around 1946, but the flag did not disappear.

===== EVIS flag =====
Flag of the Voluntary Army for the Independence of Sicily^{it} (1945–1946)

EVIS flag consists of Senyera and the blue canton with Trinacria. The flag symbolized the group's very pro-American position. When the EVIS disappeared after the war, the flag was taken over by MIS, which strengthened the separatist symbolism.

=== Region of Sicily ===
1995–2000

Sicily adopted its first official flag in 1995. The difference from the current flag was that there was a coat of arms instead of a Trinacria. The coat of arms consisted of four fields: 1st Hauteville family, 2nd Manfred's eagle, 3rd Trinacria, and 4th Red Bars. The flag changed in 2000 to the current design.
