= Sicilian nationalism =

Secessionist movement in Italy

Flag of the Sicilian Independence Movement

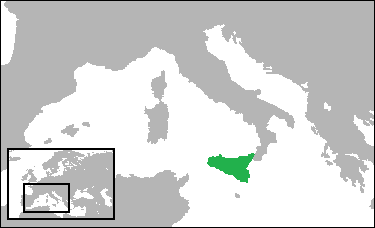
Location of Sicily

Sicilian nationalism, or Sicilianism, is a movement in the autonomous Italian region of Sicily, as well as the Sicilian diaspora, which seeks greater autonomy or outright independence from Italy, and/or promotes further inclusion of the Sicilian identity, culture, history, and linguistic variety.

Various separatist and autonomist movements in Sicily have received support mostly from the political left, but also to a lesser extent the right, and centre. Historically, the most notable party with a Sicilian nationalist platform was the separatist Movement for the Independence of Sicily, which had four seats in the Italian Senate and nine seats in the Italian Chamber of Deputies at their peak in the mid-1940s.

In contemporary Sicily, the largest regionalist party has been the autonomist Party of the Sicilians, part of the greater Movement for the Autonomies, which governed Sicily under the presidency of Raffaele Lombardo from 2008 to 2012. The left-wing sicilianism, once active through some Sicilian socialists, Antonino Varvaro's Movimento Indipendentista Democratico Repubblicano ("Republican Democratic Sicilian Independence Movement", MISDR) and the Communist Party of Sicily, is now represented only by the Sicilian Socialist Party, a former regional section of the Italian Socialist Party.

== History ==
=== Background ===
The idea of independence, in the modern sense of the term, has appeared many times in ancient Sicilian history. During Sicily's prehistory the tribal nations (Sicani, Siculi, Elymians) all had their own forms of Sicilian identity. However the Island was divided into the three regions. When it comes to a unified Sicilian national identity some contemporary cite as precursors two experiences, not only of emancipation of the island, but above all of awareness on the part of Sicilians of belonging to a nation in its own right. An example of the first experience, the revolt of the Sicilians of Ducetius and as a realization of the second, the subsequent Congress of Gela (where the principle "neither Ions, nor Dori but Sicilians") and the consequent birth, with Dionysius I, of a Siceliote state, more or less unitary, became a real Kingdom with Agathocles and his successors, which lasted from the 5th to the end of the third century BCE. Similarly, the policies of the very young Basileus of Sicily Hieronymus of Syracuse can be considered since during the Second Punic War, to prevent the fall of Sicily under the Roman yoke, he broke the alliance with the Romans (concluded many years earlier by his grandfather Hiero II and endorsed by his father Gelo) approaching Carthage. Hyeronimus, at first, had obtained from Hannibal the guarantee of maintaining the independence of the Siceliote kingdom limited to the eastern half of Sicily located east of the southern River Imera; later, sensing a certain weakness on Hannibal's part, the young Siceliote king came to obtain a promise to rule, in the event of a total victory against the Romans, over all of Sicily. Finally, during the Roman period, it is worth remembering the Revolt of eunnus's slaves as an attempt by the Sicilians to free themselves from the heavy yoke exercised by the Romans. Later on, a new form of Sicilian identity and nationalism would be born during the Emirate of Sicily. During this period many new cultural influences blended into the island however the sense of being one Sicilian people was even more present due to the creation of the Sicilian Arabic language as a lingua franca on the island. Later Norman rulers would develop the idea by pushing for the later Sicilian language.

=== The Vespers ===
The Sicilian Vespers is considered the progenitor of modern independence, in fact it was a movement of separation from the foreigner who at the time was the French Angevin.

==== The 1820 motions ====
This resulted, in 1820, in a revolution in Palermo, which led to the establishment of a provisional, openly separatist government. However, the lack of coordination of the forces of the various Sicilian cities led to the weakening of the power of the provisional government (Messina and Catania opposed Palermo's claim to want to rule the island), which soon decayed under the blows of the Bourbon repression that also had as its victim the carbonaro patriot Gaetano Abela. The failure of this first revolution, however, did not deter the Sicilian political forces, which would try again about 20 years later.

=== The Voluntary Army for the Independence of Sicily (1943–1951) ===
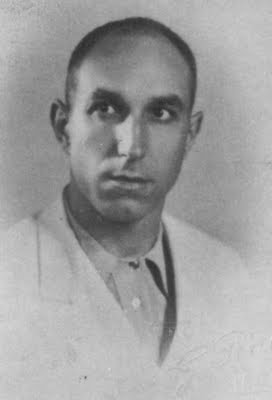
Antonio Canepa, Sicilian Nationalist

Sicilian independence went through another period of rebirth from about 1943 to 1950, with the birth of the Movement for the Independence of Sicily. On 12 June 1943, on the occasion of the fall of Pantelleria, a separatist proclamation was issued by the so-called Provisional Action Committee that in the following weeks became the Committee for Sicilian Independence. After the Allied landings on the island, the separatist movement was further strengthened by widening the consensus among the masses. The end of fascism was linked to the urgent dissolution of Italian unity. The main promoter of this initiative was Andrea Finocchiaro Aprile, considered the father of contemporary Sicilian separatism. The main points were: self-determination and an Independent Republic of Sicily with a socialist economic system. Another prominent figure was Antonio Canépa, of revolutionary socialist ideas, university professor of the Royal University of Catania, anti-fascist, agent of the British secret services and already a partisan. Canepa was the founder of EVIS, the Volunteer Army for the independence of Sicily that began its activity in February 1945 in response to the "return" of Allied occupied Sicily to Italy. The birth of this organization, whose existence was not publicly supported by the MIS, (indeed it was opposed by some of its leaders such as Antonino Varvaro, also left-wing), was motivated as a response to the growing "Italian colonial repression". Canepa himself, together with the two young militants Rosano and Lo Giudice, was killed near Randazzo in a firefight with the carabinieri on the morning of 17 June 1945 in circumstances that are not yet entirely clear. After the death of Mario Turri (battle name of Canepa) the ranks of the army – stuffed by Salvatore Giuliano and Rosario Avila – passed to the command of Concetto Gallo. The action of the two bandits puts the police to the test with assaults on convoys, lorries, barracks and stations, resulting in a high number of casualties. The Government responded by sending the "Aosta" division – in support of the "Savoy" – and the Garibaldi brigade. The main armed battle took place in San Mauro di Caltagirone on 29 December 1945. The Italian troops managed to arrest Gallo and further "Police operations in style" scaled back the Evis and allowed the state to propose and start negotiations with the separatists that lead to the statute that granted to Sicily a special autonomy as a region in Italy in 1946. The MIS continued to survive as a minor party but emptied of some of its contents and members since for a lot of people autonomy was enough and finally dissolved in 1951.

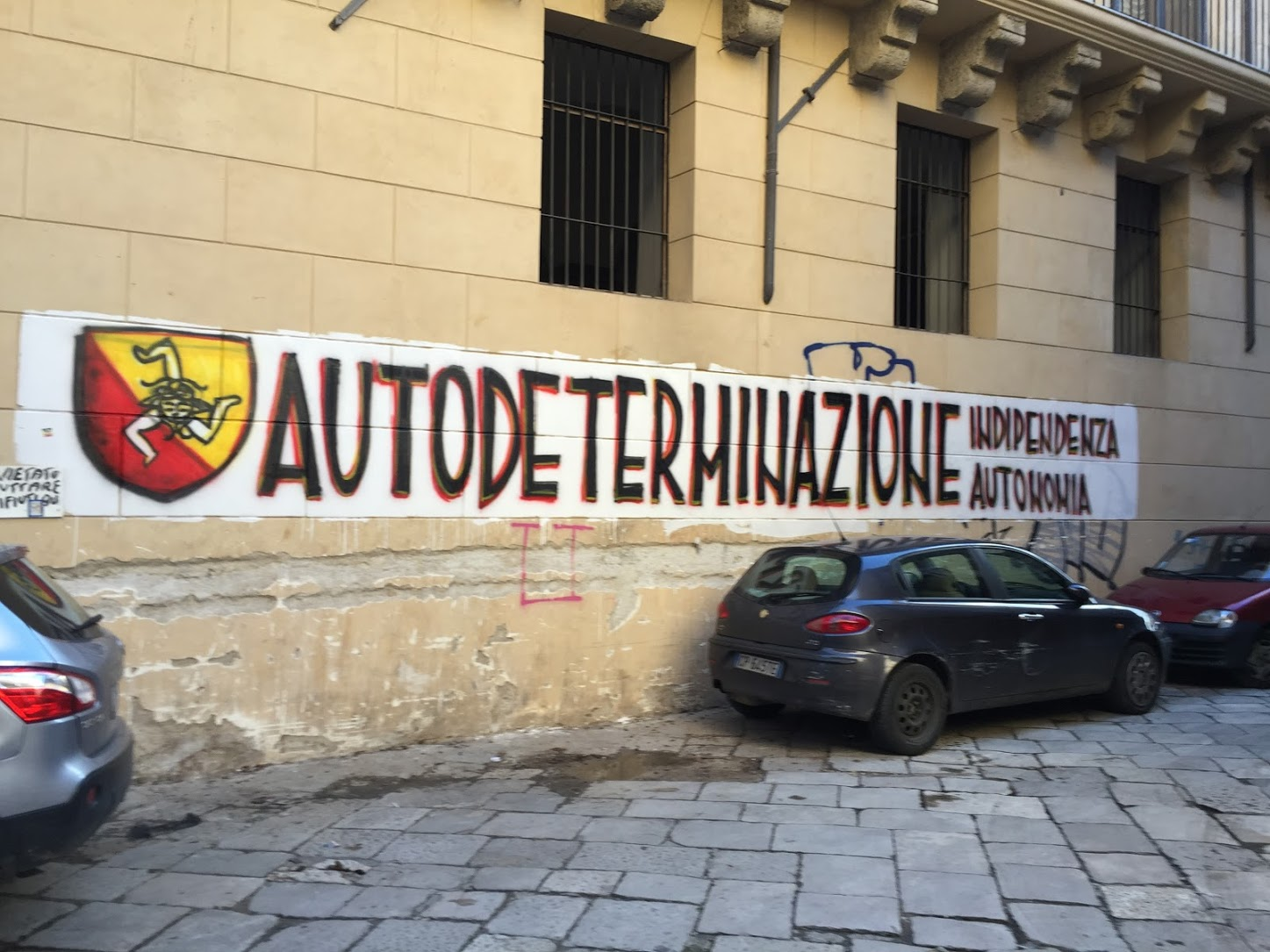
Graffito in Palermo, Sicily with the text "Self Determination, Autonomy, Independence"

There were and are still present to this day other parties in Sicily which are searching and pushing for Sicilian independence, but no one ever managed to reach the same results of the MIS during World War II.

== Political and autonomist support ==
After Lombardo's autonomist government, going from 2008 to 2012, the largest predominantly Meridionalist and Sicilianist coalition in the 2012 regional election, led by the center-right Gianfranco Micciché gathered 19.98% of the votes, becoming no longer the governing coalition. From then on, they served in the opposition in the Sicilian Regional Assembly. Election fraud are quite common; there are strict connections between various sicilian politicians of the Italian national parties and mafia. There are strict connections also between mafia and masonry.

The Sicilian nationalist candidate from the party "Free Sicilians", Roberto La Rosa, taking part in the 2017 regional elections, got 0.70% of the vote.

A 2014 survey commissioned by the newspaper La Repubblica to the Demos agency reported a 44% of the sample in favor of a possible independence of Sicily, third place after Veneto and Sardinia.

The sicilianist candidate from Free Sicilians, Eliana Esposito, in the 2022 Sicilian regional election got 0.52% of the vote, but the new autonomist party South calls North got 13.61%.

New parties like PAS: Party for the Autonomy of Sicily emerged during the COVID-19 pandemic, in particular during the Draghi government, because of hard restrictions imposed by the government like the so-called Super green pass.

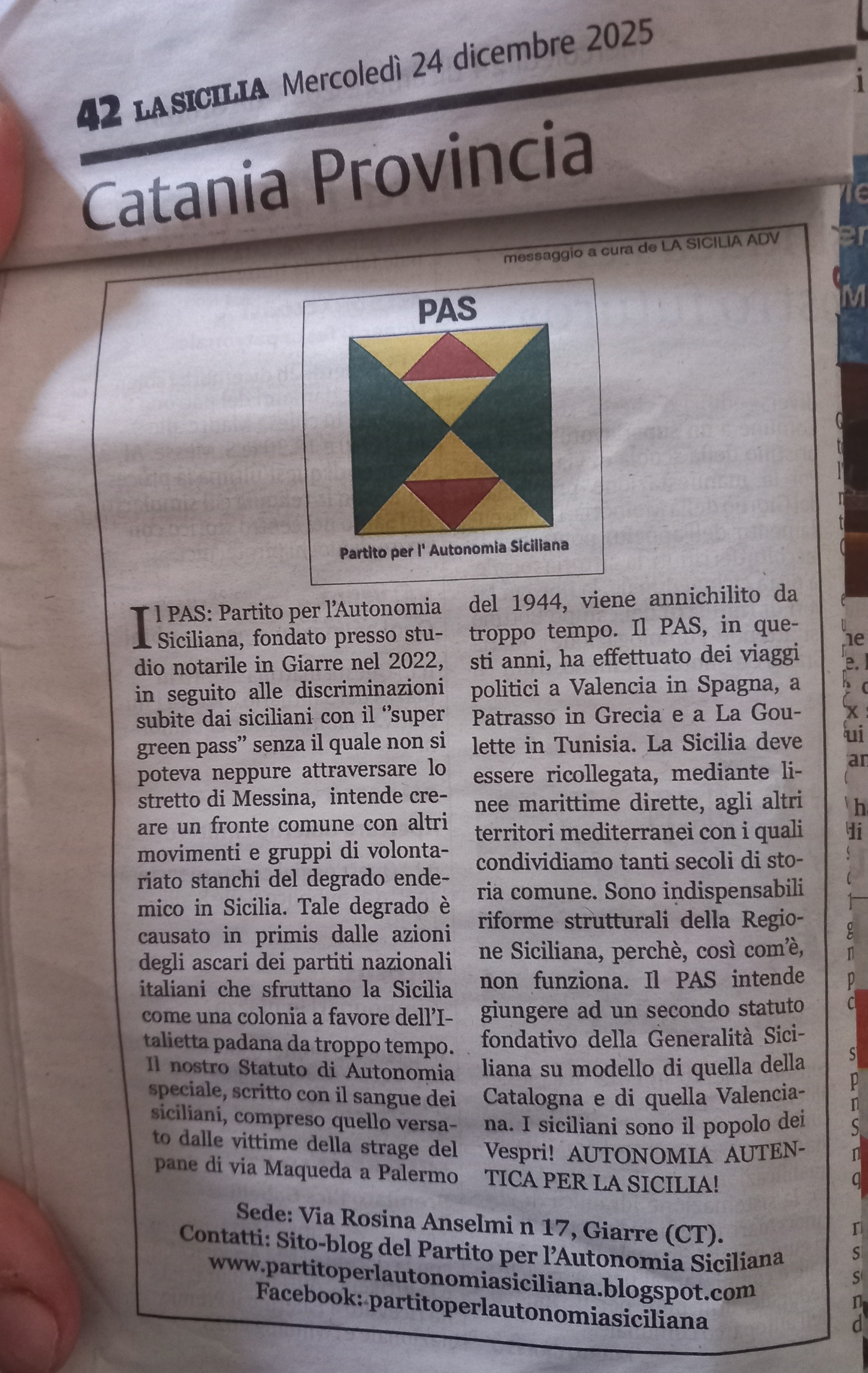

=== 2006 party support ===
Party	Votes	Percentage	Seats
Movement for Autonomy – New Sicily	308,219	12.52%	10
Sicilian Alliance	59,380	2.41%	0
Christian Democracy for Autonomies	6,530	0.26%	0
TOTAL:	374,129	15.19%	10

=== 2008 party support ===
Party	Votes	Percentage	Seats
Movement for Autonomy – Allies for the South	375,587	13.94%	15
Sicily Strong and Free	119,892	4.45%	0
Autonomist Democrats	101,449	3.76%	0
TOTAL:	596,928	22.15%	15

=== 2012 party support ===
Party	Votes	Percentage	Seats
Party of the Sicilians – Movement for the Autonomies	182,737	9.53%	7
Force of the South – Great South	115,444	6.02%	3
People of the Pitchfork – Sicilian National Front	23,965	1.25%	0
Sicilian Revolution	22,422	1.17%	0
TOTAL:	344,568	17.97%	10

=== 2017 party support ===
Party	Votes	Percentage	Seats
Populars and Autonomists	136,520	7.09%	5
Future Sicily and Italian Socialist Party	115,751	6.01%	2
Free Sicilians	12,600	0.70%	0
TOTAL:	264,871	13.76%	7

=== 2022 party support ===
Party	Votes	Percentage	Seats
Populars and Autonomists	127,096	6.80%	3
South calls North	254,453	13.61%	7
Sicilia Vera	50,877	2.72%	0
Free Sicilians	7,654	0.41%	0
Sicilian Autonomy	3,042	0.16%	0
TOTAL:	443,122	23.70%	10

== See also ==
- Emirate of Sicily
- Kingdom of Sicily
- Kingdom of the Two Sicilies
- Politics of Sicily
- Sicilian Vespers
- Sicilian Parliament
- Sicilian revolution of 1848
- Southern Italy autonomist movements
