= Greek coinage of Italy and Sicily =

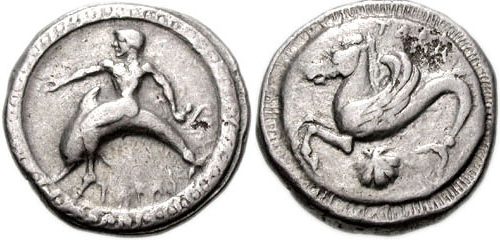
Coins of Taras (modern Taranto) from the 5th century BC

Greek coinage of Italy and Sicily originated from local Italiotes and Siceliotes who formed numerous city states. These Hellenistic communities descended from Greek migrants. Southern Italy was so thoroughly hellenized that it was known as the Magna Graecia. Each of the polities struck their own coinage.

Taras (or Tarentum) was among the most prominent city states.

By the second century BC some of these Greek coinages evolved under Roman rule, and can be classified as the first Roman provincial currencies.

== Themes and design ==
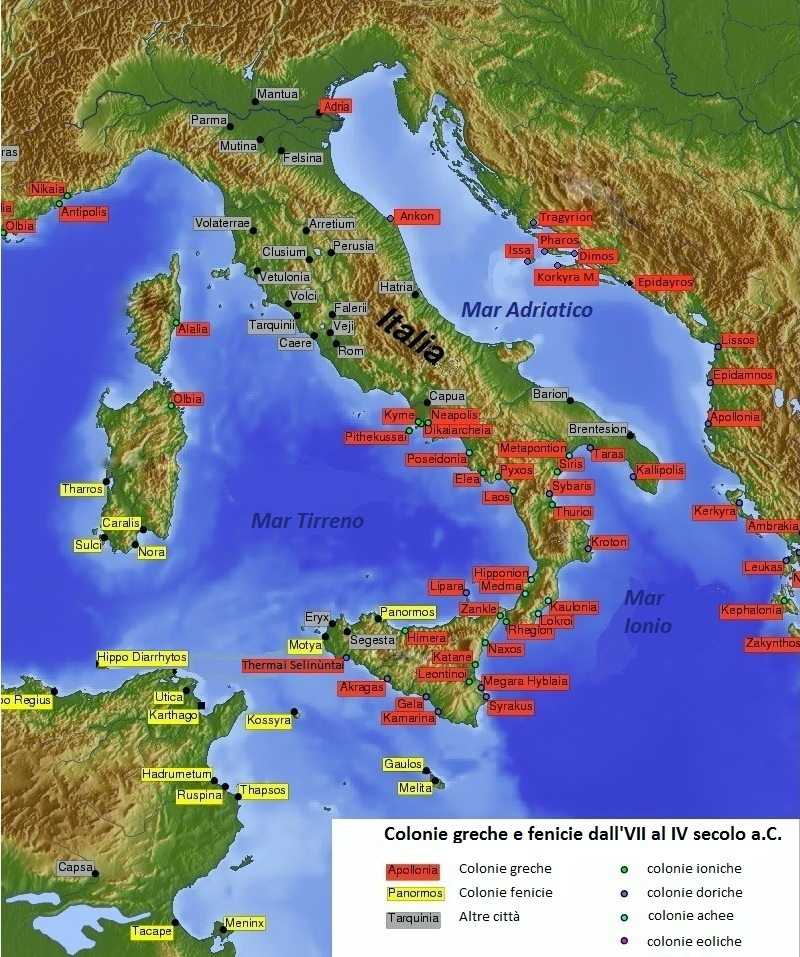
Location of ancient Greek colonies (names with red labels) in Italy and neighbouring regions

A common theme in the Italiote coinage was to include portraits of gods or other mythological figures. Some featured animals and other symbols. For instance, the coins of Sybaris (Thurium) portrayed goddess Minerva. Inhabitants of Kroton (Crotone) adorned their coinage with images of Hercules. The city of Posidonia (Paestum) had received its name from Greek god Poseidon whose portrait they struck in their coinage. The city was founded by Sybarite colonists, and obverses of Posidonian coinage included a symbol of their parent city, the bull. Taras, the most prosperous city state, struck coinage with dolphins and seahorses. The winged seahorse refers to Poseidon. A certain unusual coin from Neapolis (Naples) portrayed a bull with a human face. One theory for its origin is that it may have celebrated some sort of an alliance with the Romans. The city of Gelas in Sicily was founded by Rhodian settlers. It was originally known as Lindii after their home town Lindos, but the city was renamed after the river Gelas. They struck coinage with depictions of the local river god.

Some tyrants in Magna Graecia advertised their victories in the Olympic Games by striking coinage that referred to these specific achievements.

Style of figures in coins can be compared to pottery from the region. This gives clues about when the pottery in question was made. Furthermore, ages of the cities such Sybaris are well known.

== Weight standard ==
The weights of silver coinage were inherited from Corinthian merchants. Commercial ties between Corinth and Taras were tight-knit. This brought the Persian weight standard for gold coinage to Magna Graecia. Phocaean standard had also been in use in the region. Later, Aeginetic standard appeared and was briefly used. It had been brought to southern Italy by Chalcidian settlers. Cities in the region eventually adopted the Attic standard.

Sicilian (or Macedonian) talent was used for gold rather than a heavier talent used in mainland Greece.

== Magna Graecia ==
The region of Magna Graecia included originally Greek cities such as Cumae, Herakleia, Kaulonia, Kroton, Lokroi, Neapolis, Metapontum, Sybaris, Taras, Thurii and Rhegion.

The cities of Taras, Metapontum, Sybaris and Kroton were founded between c. 750 BC – c. 650 BC, and it is likely that they brought their knowledge of recently invented minting straight from their home cities.

=== Taras ===
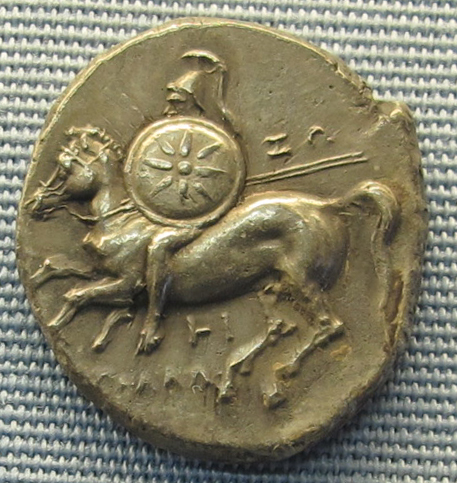
Tarantine coin portraying a mounted soldier

Coins of Taras from the 4th century BC picture a mounted cavalryman equipped with a shield. At that time no other Greek military equipped cavalry with shields. It can be deduced that the influence of Taras may have been responsible for the spread of shielded cavalry to other Greek polities.

Throughout the Greek world it was common that weight standards of Hellenistic coinage decreased in weight over time. One explanation is that, as worn money circulated back to the issuing state, the worn coins were recoined. More noticeable reductions in weight can be occasionally attributed to a single event. During the Pyrrhic War (280–275 BC) coinage of Taras decreased in size noticeably, and the war also impacted coinage of certain other Greek polities in Italy. Silver coinage of Taras, Kroton, Herakleia, Thurii and Metapontum were 7.9 g in weight before the war, but decreased in weight and size to 6.6 g. Subsequent issue of Tarantine coins also suffered from debasement of five percent. This downward evolution was significantly affected by the financial strain caused by warfare for the Greek polities. For instance, countering the expansion of Rome caused considerable pressure for the Italiote city states.

== Sicily ==
Naxos was the oldest Greek city on the island. Chalcidean settlers founded the city in 735 BC. It was also the first city on the island to issue coinage. The city grew rich from producing wine, and it honoured the god Dionysos on their first coinage. Satyrs were another common theme on their coinage. Katana, founded in 730 BC by colonists moving out of the city of Naxos, was known for its masterful engravers whose work resulted in very fine coinage. Dionysios I, tyrant of Syracuse, destroyed the city of Naxos in 403 BC. Survivors from Naxos founded the city of Tauromenion in 358 BC.

Himera and Zancle were two other early issuers of coinage on the island of Sicily. They were also founded by Chalcidean settlers. Nacona was a small Greek town in Sicily the existence of which, at an unknown location, is confirmed by coins bearing the legend "NAKONAION", or "ΝΑΚΩΝΑΙΩΝ”.

During the 4th century BC coinage became scarce. Punic coins and Corinthian staters were the principal currencies in circulation. Carthaginian expansion in Sicily caused this disruption of the local monetary system. However, native Sicilian coinage lost even more ground during the 3rd century BC and largely disappeared. The Second Punic War was the cause of this latter disruption. Only rarely bronze coins were struck. The Second Punic War had similar effects in the Southern Italy.

=== Syracuse ===
In the 6th century BC Syracuse began minting its own coinage. They used Attic-Euboic weight standard, and it was rapidly adopted by the other polities of Sicily. In the 5th century a strong government and widely militarized society ruled by tyrants left behind abundant coinage.

== Roman provincial currency ==
By 210 BC Rome was controlling all of the Greek cities in the region. At the beginning of the next century a clear Roman influence on the Greek coinage can be noticed. Both iconography and style of the coins had changed. Greek coinage from this period can be classified as the first instances of Roman provincial currency.

== See also ==
- Coinage of the Social War (91–88 BC)
- Greeks in Italy
- Sicels
- History of coins in Italy
- Coinage of Picenum
