= Three-finger salute (Sicilian) =

Sicilian nationalist salute

The three-finger salute is a salute used by the Sicilian nationalists and separatists.

It was especially used during the era of the Movement for the Independence of Sicily (1943–1951) led by Andrea Finocchiaro Aprile.

The salute represents the Trinacria's three legs.

== See also ==
- Trinacria
- Sicilian nationalism
- Movement for the Independence of Sicily
- Three-finger salute (Serbian)
