= Antonio Canepa =

Italian politician (1908–1945)

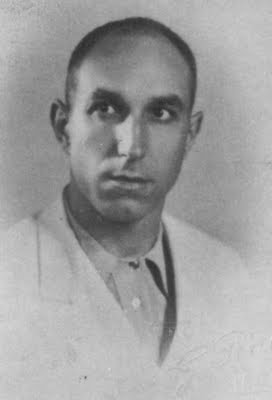
- Born: 25 October 1908; Palermo, Sicily
- Died: 17 June 1945 (aged 36); Randazzo, Sicily
- Other names: Mario Turri
- Occupations: Politician, revolutionary, professor, writer
- Known for: Founder of the EVIS

Antonio Canepa (Palermo, 25 October 1908 – Randazzo, 17 June 1945) was a Sicilian politician, revolutionary, professor and writer, known as one of the most important advocates of the Sicilian nationalism. He was the leader of the socialist faction of Movement for the Independence of Sicily (Movimento per l'Indipendenza della Sicilia) and the founder of the Volunteer Army for the Independence of Sicily (Esercito Volontario per l'Indipendenza della Sicilia, EVIS).

He studied at the Jesuits in Palermo and then at the Pennisi College of Acireale. He graduated in law in Palermo in 1930 discussing a thesis entitled Unity or plurality of legal systems?. He was in contact with anti-fascist groups with whom he wanted to organize in 1933 a coup d'état in the Republic of San Marino, for the sole purpose of demonstrating the active presence of forces opposed to the fascist regime. The plan was foiled and Canepa was arrested on June 17, 1933 along with his brother Luigi and other exponents, who were sentenced to sentences of two to four years in prison, while Canepa, pretending to be infirm mind, was hospitalized in an asylum until November 1934.

In 1942, under the alias of Mario Turri, he published the pamphlet "La Sicilia ai Siciliani" (Sicily for the Sicilians), an important separatist manifesto. He was killed in Randazzo in 1945 during a gunfight with the Carabinieri.

According to recent studies, the idea is highlighted that in the murder of the leader of EVIS there is the combined hand of international secret services because the Yalta agreements had already established that Sicily should be part of Italy, therefore it was necessary to neutralize the separatist outbreaks.

On the site of the massacre stands a cippo dedicated to the fallen of EVIS Antonio Canepa is buried in the cemetery of Catania, in the avenue of illustrious Sicilians, next to Giovanni Verga and Angelo Musco.

His son Antonio Enrico Canepa, born in 1940, was a Socialist MP for three terms, but died at the age of 43 from an overdose.
