= Italiotes =

Pre-Roman Greek-speaking inhabitants of the Italian Peninsula

Ethnic composition of Italy (as defined by today's borders) in 400 BC.

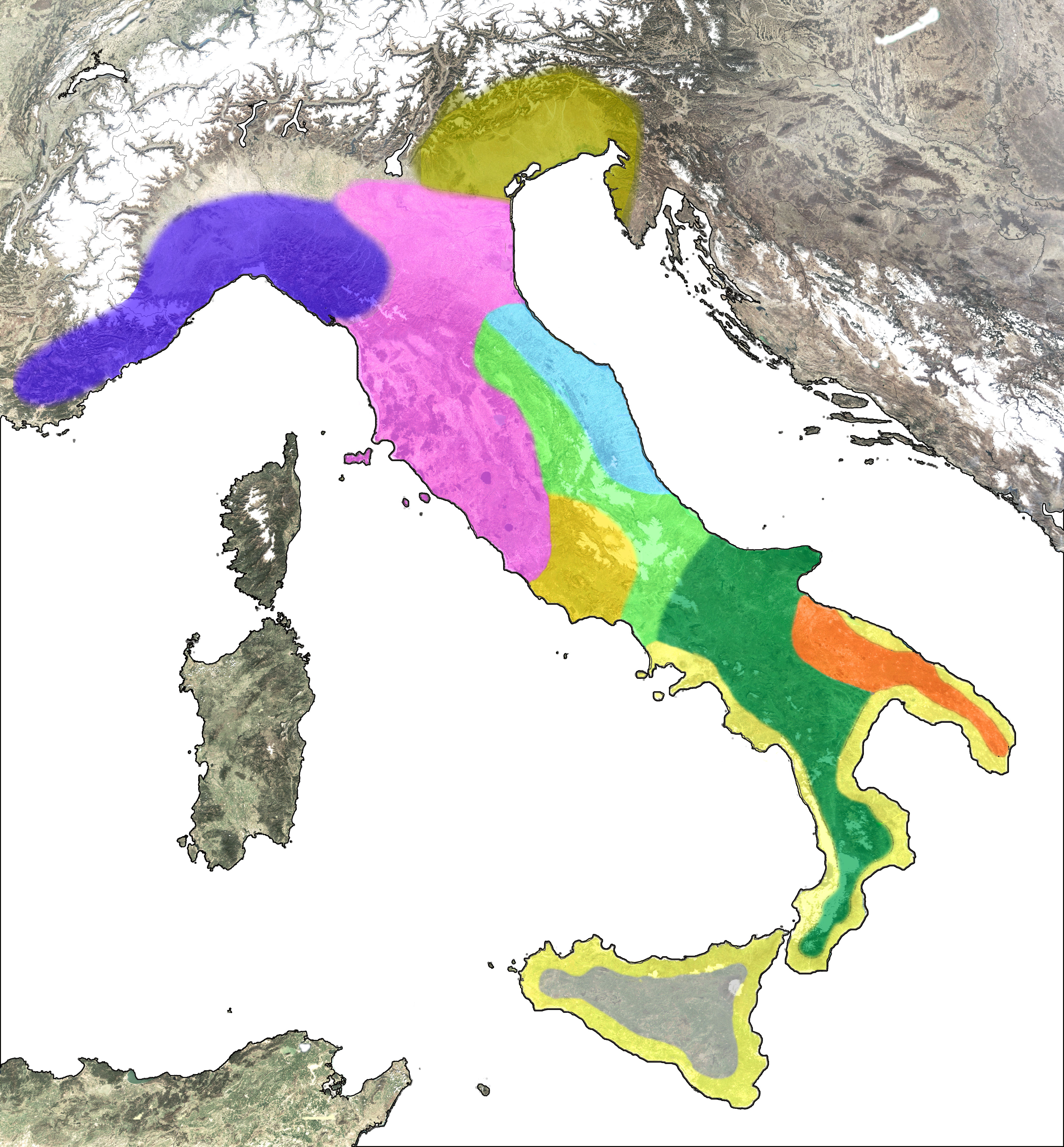
Ethnic groups within the Italian peninsula Ligures Veneti Etruscans Picentes Umbrians Latins Oscans Messapians Greeks

The Italiotes (Ancient Greek: Ἰταλιῶται, Italiōtai) were the pre-Roman Greek-speaking inhabitants of the Italian Peninsula, between Naples and Calabria.

Greek colonisation of the coastal areas of southern Italy and Sicily started in the 8th century BC and, by the time of the Roman ascendance, the area was so extensively hellenised that Romans called it Magna Graecia, that is "Greater Greece".

The Latin alphabet is a derivative of the Western Greek alphabet used by these settlers, and was picked up and adopted and modified first by the Etruscans and then by the Romans.

== See also ==
- Italiote league
- Ancient peoples of Italy
- Battle of Pandosia
- Greek coinage of Italy and Sicily
- Italiot Greek: modern dialects
- Magna Graecia
- Milo of Croton
- Phlyax play
- Siceliotes
- Sicels
