= National Archaeological Museum of the Marches =

Museum in Ancona, Marche, Italy

- Museo archeologico nazionale delle Marche
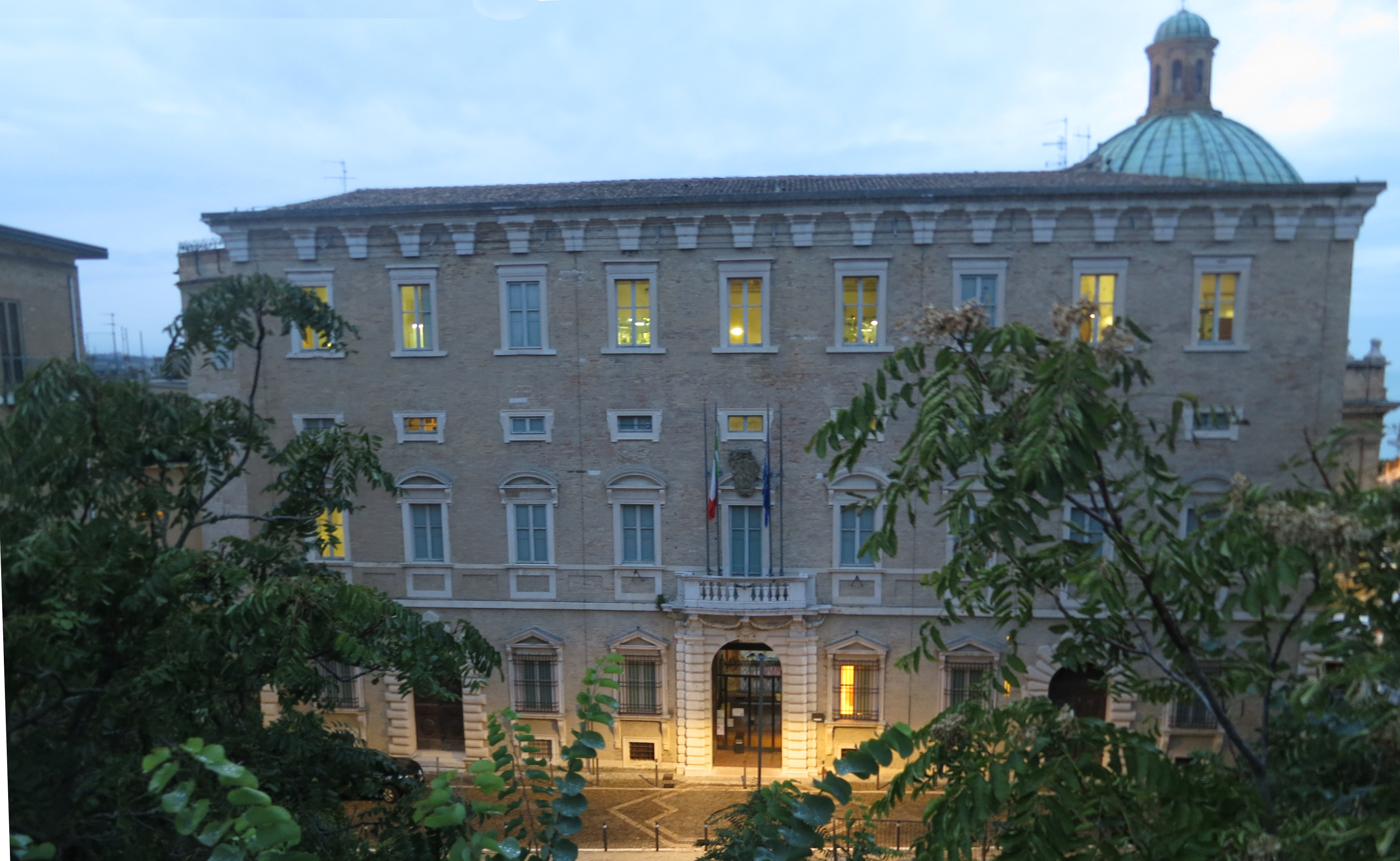
- The Palazzo Ferretti
- Established: 1863
- Location: Palazzo Ferretti, Via Ferretti, 6-60121 Ancona, Italy
- Type: archaeology
- Collections: Romans, Greeks

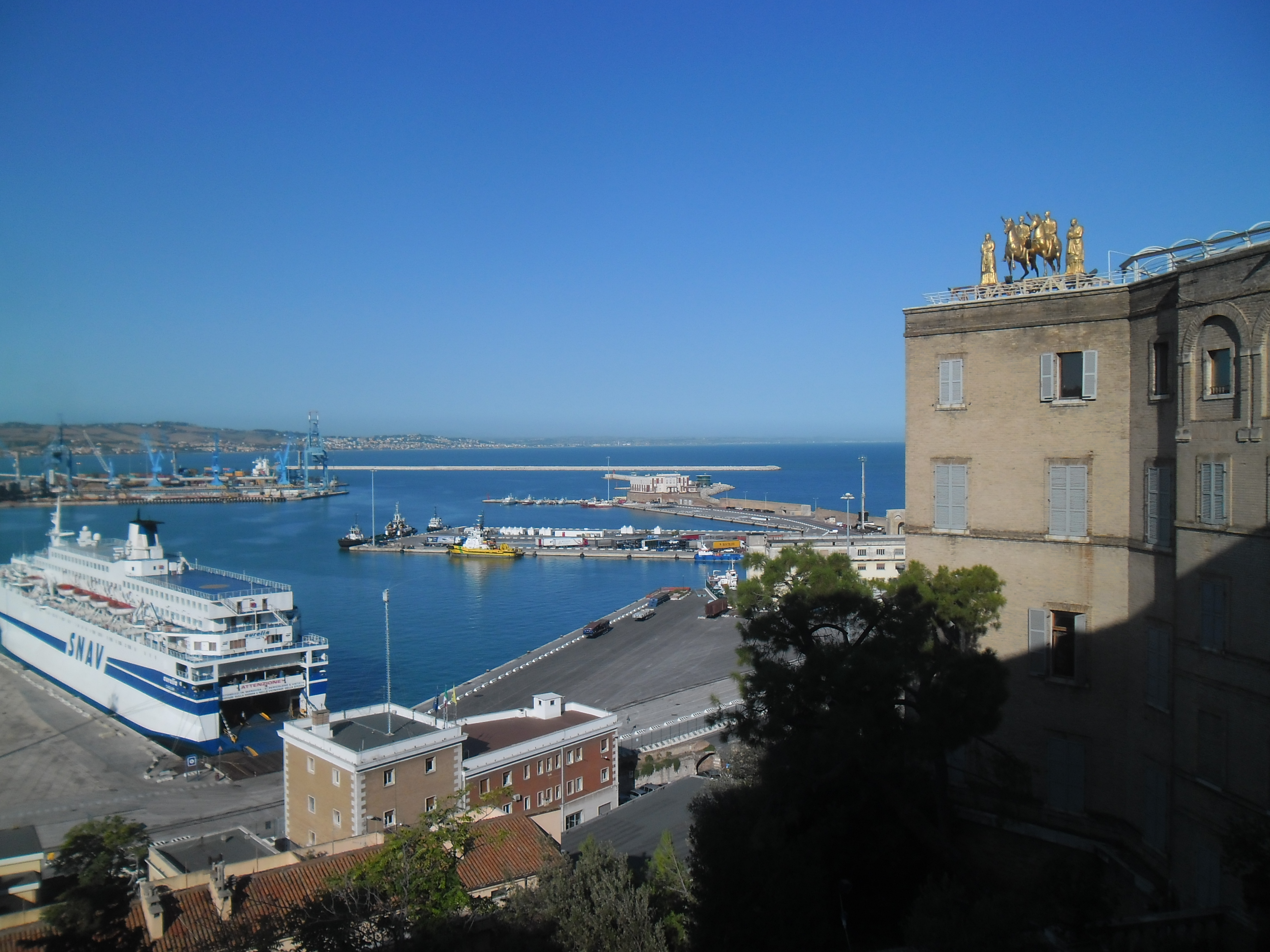
View from the museum

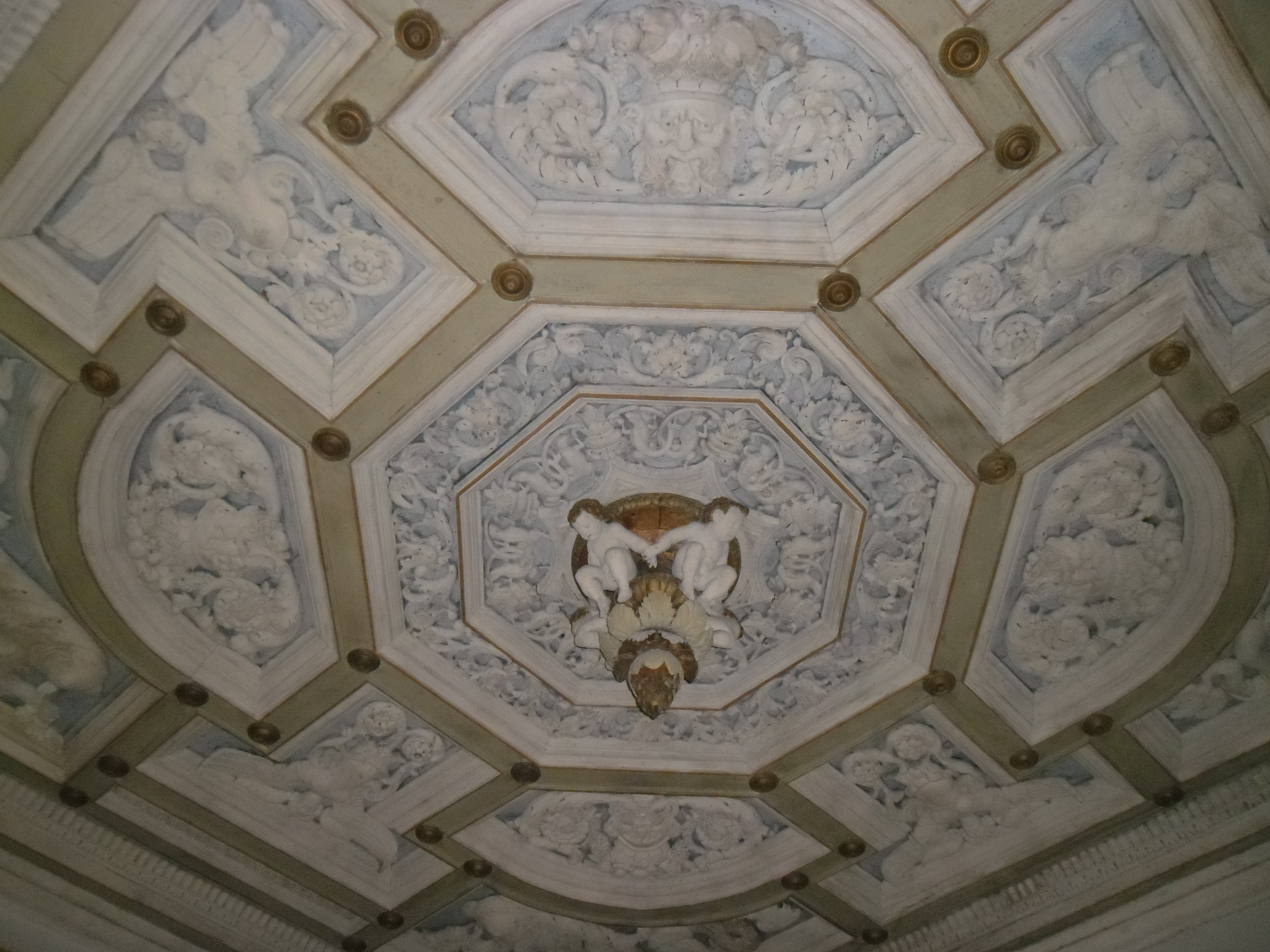
Decorated plafond

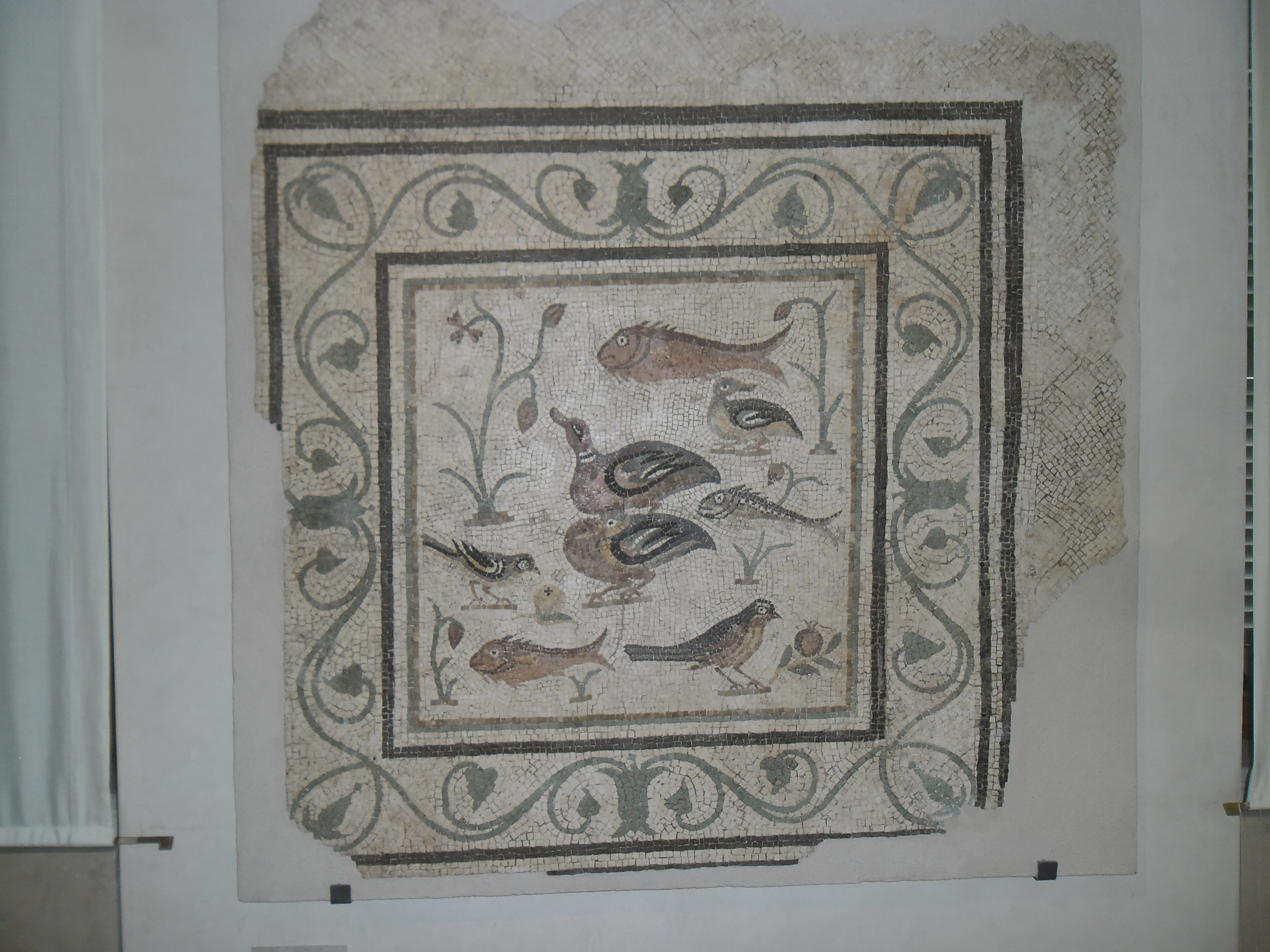
One of exhibits

The National Archaeological Museum of the Marches (Museo archeologico nazionale delle Marche) is an archaeological museum in Ancona, Marches, Italy. It is located in the Palazzo Ferretti, and 13,195 people visited the collections in 2015.

== History ==
A plan to set up a region-wide archaeological collection in Ancona was first devised the day after approval was granted for the Royal Decree issued by Lorenzo Valerio, the Extraordinary Commissioner for the Marches, on 3 November 1860. It was a cause much advocated by Count Carlo Rinaldini (1824–1866), a scholar in epigraphy and the secretary of the Commission and by Carisio Ciavarini (1837–1905) from the town of Pesaro, a grammar-school Italian literature teacher. Both men were staunch patriots, supporters of the Italian Risorgimento and members of an enlightened ruling class who were extremely receptive to a positivist approach and keenly aware of the need to break away from the old regime. Creating a Museum which "would house any monuments from the Prehistoric Age onwards discovered in the local area", as Ciavarini started, was directly prompted by his specific academic interest but also by his desire to save the archaeological treasures of the Marches region from the onslaught of the rapacious antique market which was highly active at the time. Later on, the collections of the Museum would also greatly benefit from numerous chance findings as well as from routine excavations performed throughout the region. Indeed, the collection became so complete that the year after Ciavarini died in 1906 it was "royalised" and honoured with the title of the "National Museum of Ancona" (Museo Nazionale di Ancona).

On 9 October 1927, under the direction of its Superintendent Giuseppe Moretti, the Museum was inaugurated by King Victor Emmanuel III together with the Honourable Undersecretary Emilio Bodrero and the Director General for Antiques and Fine Arts, Roberto Paribeni. During the Second World War, the Museum was partially damaged by bombs falling on the city in 1943 and 1944. At the end of the war, reconstruction and restoration work on the exhibits took place under the guidance of the new Director and Superintendent Giovanni Annibaldi to whom people could be indebted for the re-opening of the Museum in 1958. Its new premises were to be the magnificent rooms of the 16th century Palazzo Feretti. But disaster struck again and the Museum was forced to shut its doors after the ravages of 1972 earthquake. This time it was the turn of the Superintendent and Director, Delia Lollini, to set to rights the Picene section of the National Archaeological Museum of the Marches before it could be re-opened to the public in 1988.

In the '90s, the Prehistoric and Bronze-Age sections were inaugurated, whilst in 2010 and 2015 the Hellenistic and Roman section dedicated to Ancona was re-opened to the public under the guidance of the Superintendent and Director Giuliano de Marinis with the assistance of the current Museum Director Nicoletta Frapiccini.

== The collections ==
The itinerary of the museum starts on the mezzanine level of the second floor with the Prehistoric section where a showcase with a "touchscreen" glass contains the Frassasi Venus, a precious statuette which is 28,000/25,000 years old. Worthy of note are some ancient Paleolithic instruments exhibits from Mount Conero which are about 300,000 years old, the Neolithic settlement of Ripabianca di Monterado (6th millennium BC), the Aeneolithic one of Conelle di Arcevia (3rd millennium BC), the twenty five bronze daggers from the depot of Ripatransone (roughly 1800–1600 BC), the Apennine and Subapennine pottery from the Grottoes of the Frassasi gorge (1500–1200 BC) and the Protovillanovian cremation necropolis from Pianello di Genga (1200–1000 BC). Tour then continues up to the third floor to the Protohistoric section where there are findings relating to the Picene settlements during the Protovillanovian Age to the Archaic Age, the Villanovian necropolis of Fermo (8th century BC) and a selection of the most important Picene funerary objects from the princely Orientalizing period, up until the Archaic Age (late 8th to early 6th century BC). During the Orientalizing period, the Picene civilisation adopted oriental social and cultural patterns, partially due to influences from the Etruscan world. This influence is visible from their funerary rituals, burial practices and the repertoire of material culture. The itinerary comes to an end in the room dedicated to Picene stelae and inscriptions.

The first floor hosts findings from the Classical and Late Classical Age, when the Picenes had developed cities and the evidences of the funerary objects points to continual contacts with the Greek world, Magna Graecia and the Etruscans. This is particularly apparent from the magnificent Numana-Sirolo necropolis with its exquisite Attic pottery precious etruscan vessels in bronze. From the 4th century BC onwards, a massive influx of Celts moved down from Central Europe to the Mediterranean. The last Celtic tribe to migrate to present-day Italy were the Senones. They migrated from the outer edge of the Po Valley until they reached the Esino River and occupied the present-day Northern Marches. The Museum exhibits many discoveries from Santa Paolina di Filottrano, San Filippo di Osimo and Montefortino di Arcevia, which includes precious gold jewellery and Celtic weapons.

The Roman section includes the frieze and pediment from the temple of Civitalba, a tangible sign of the power of the Roman in the Picene region, as well as finds from the necropolis and the settlement of Ancona (4th century BC–8th century AD) which was a lively trading centre with an abundance of superbly refined artefacts and objects imported from all over the Mediterranean area.

== Gallery ==
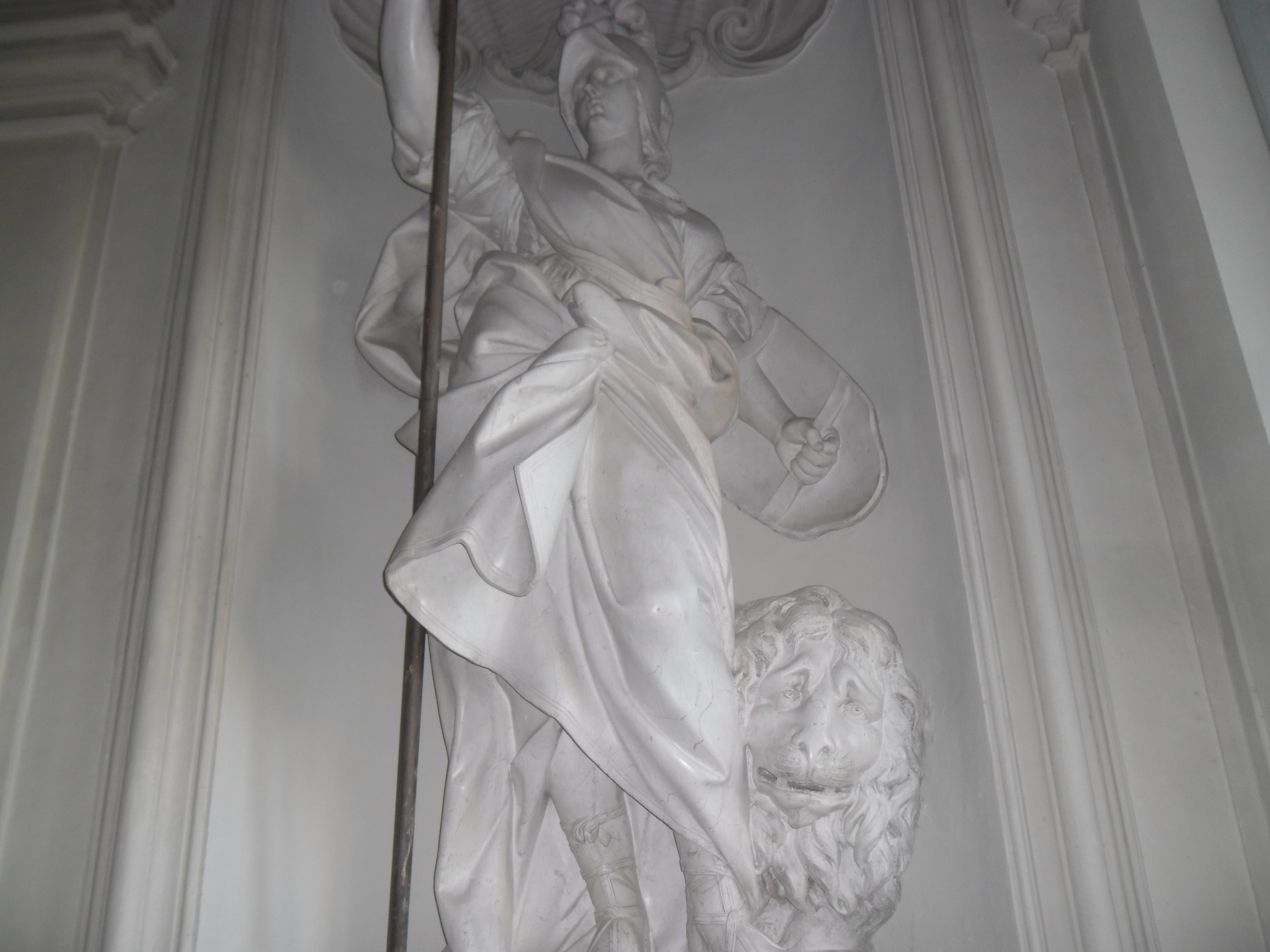

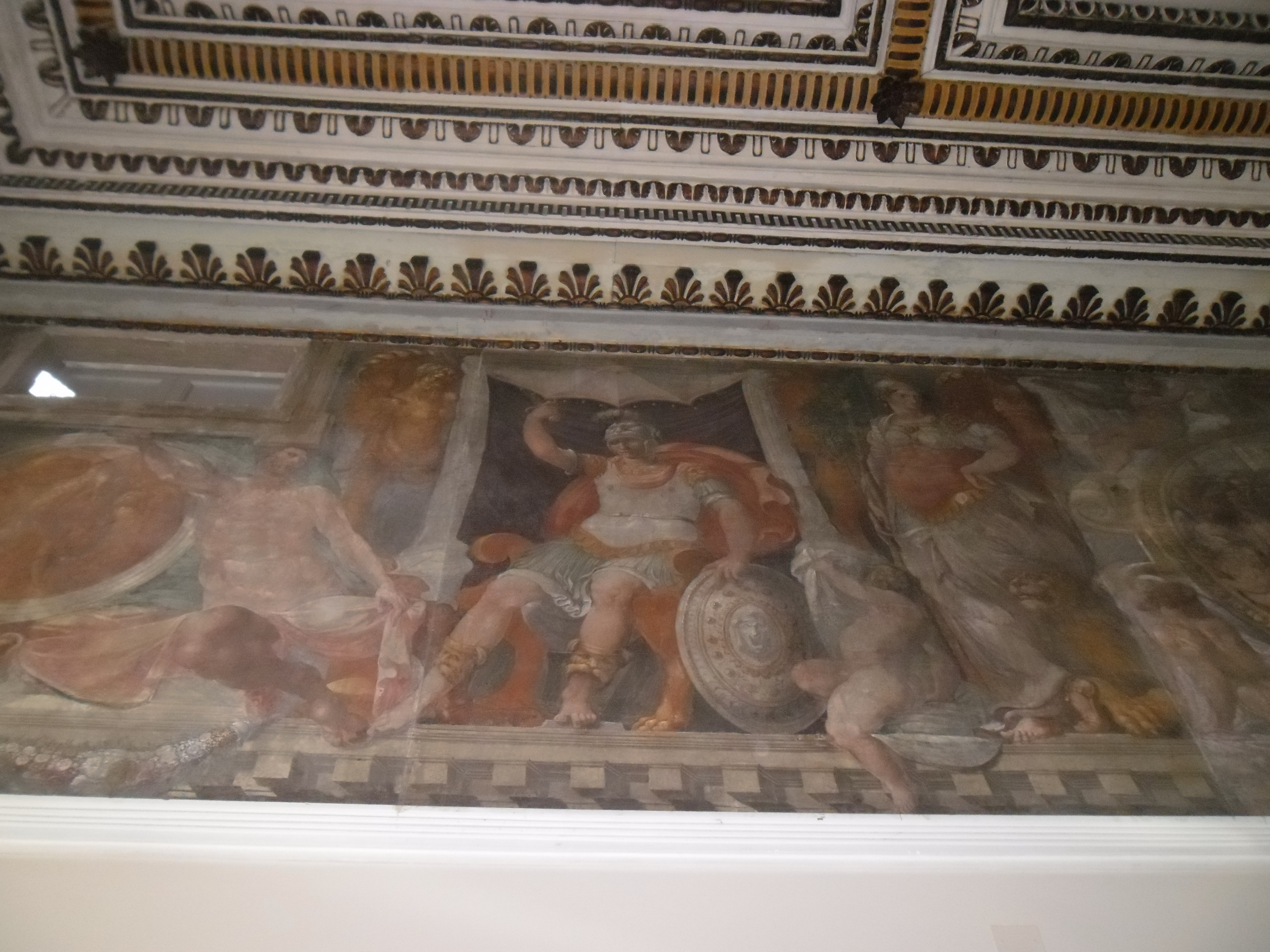

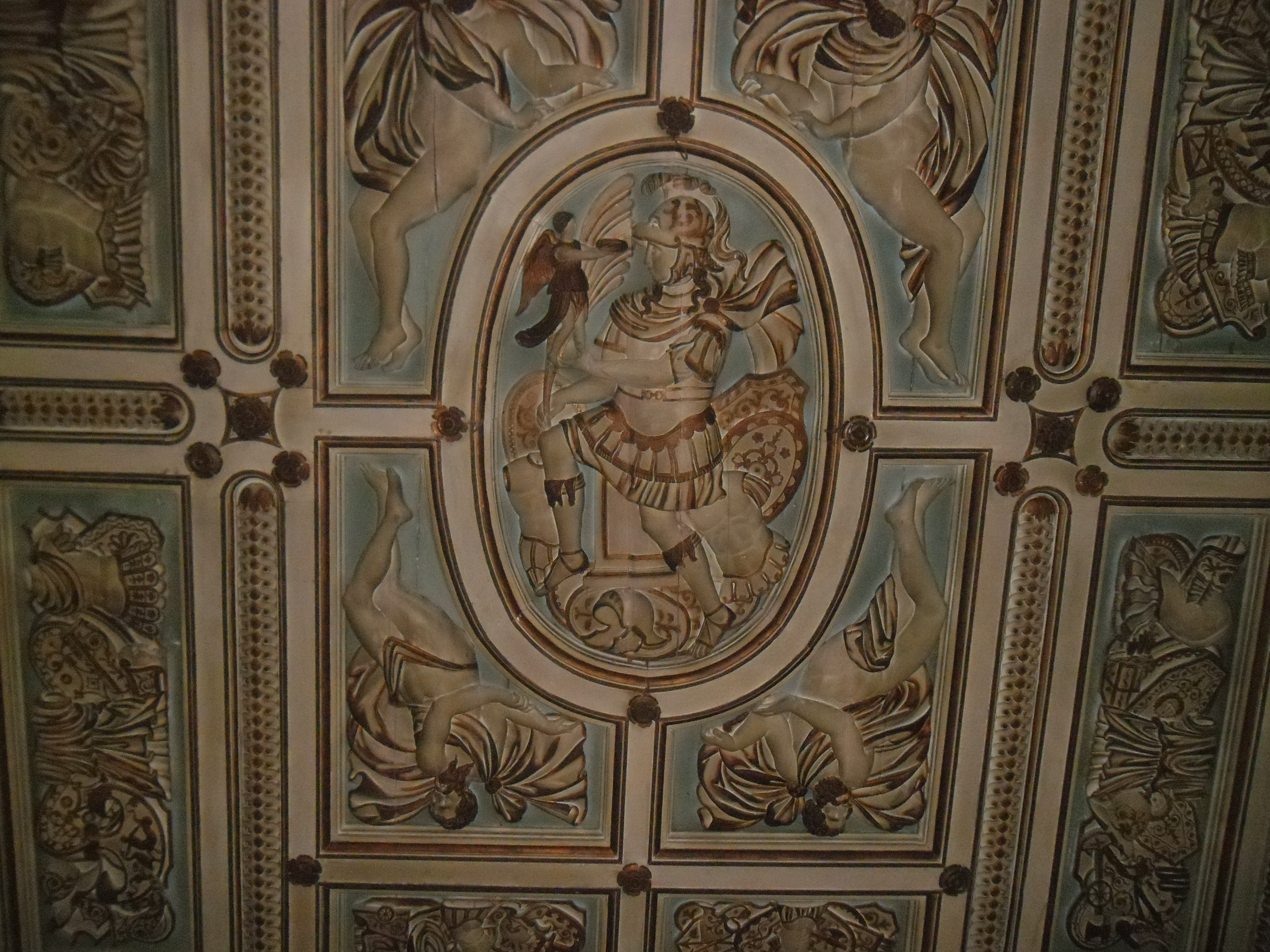

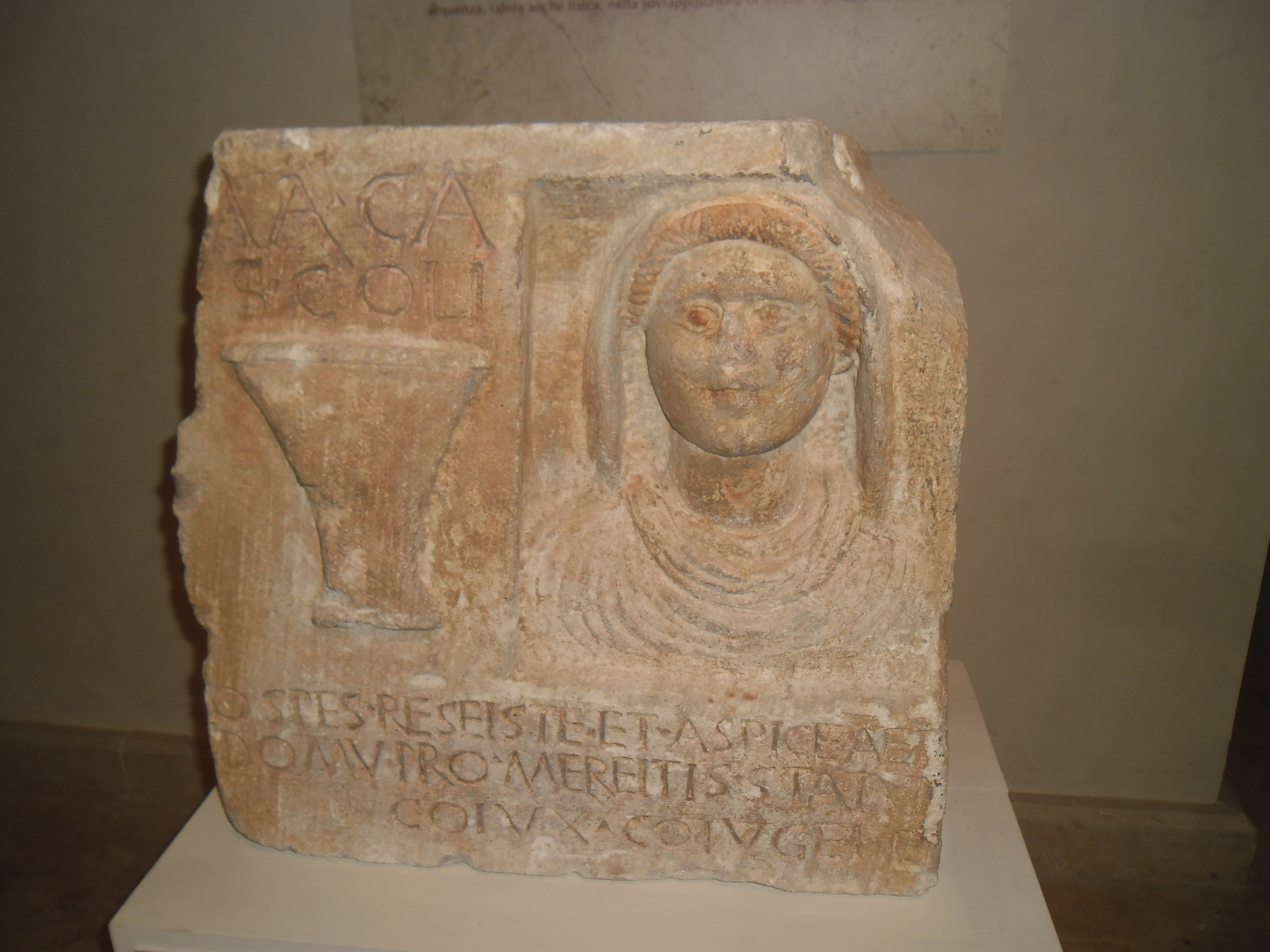

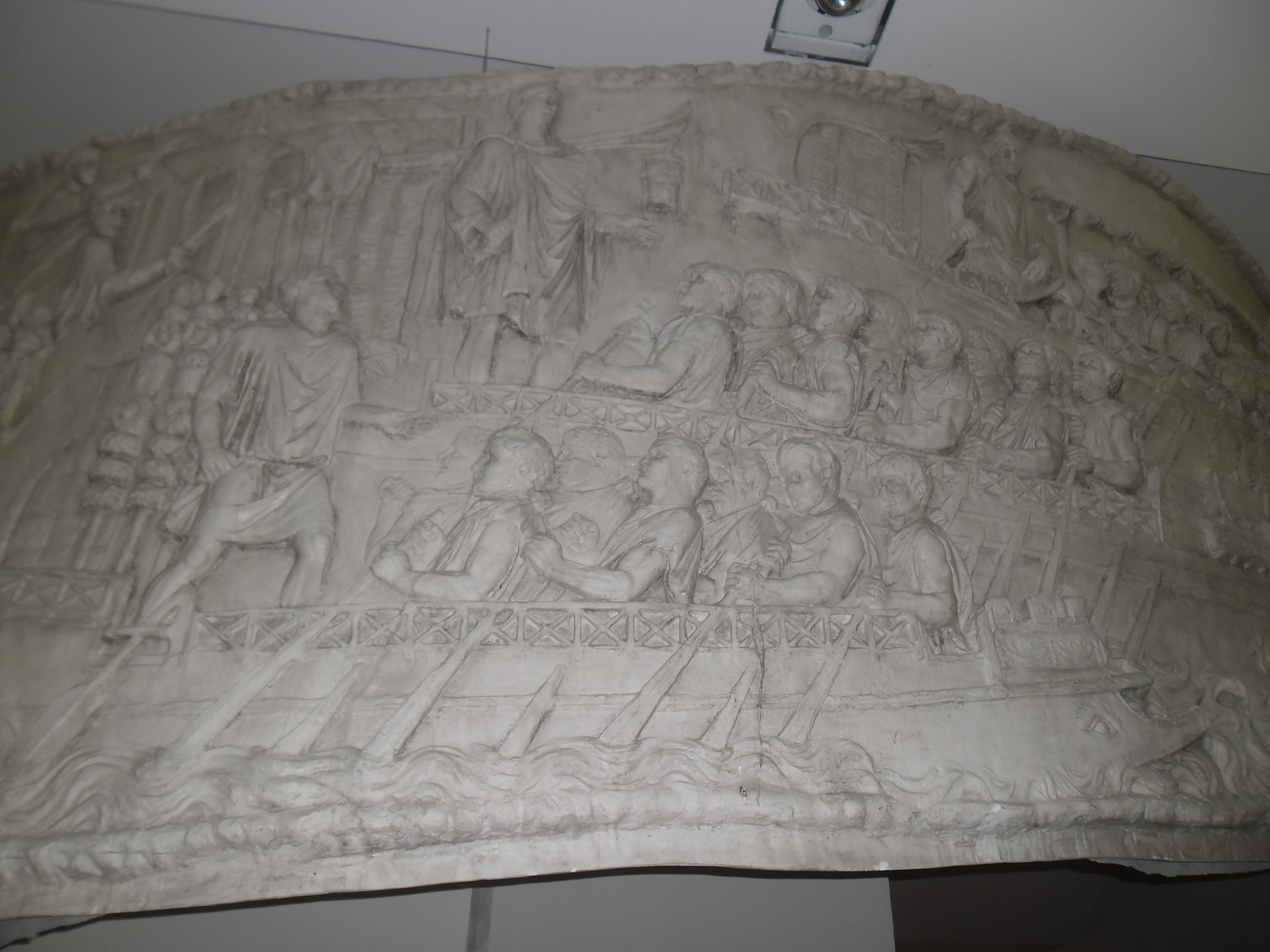

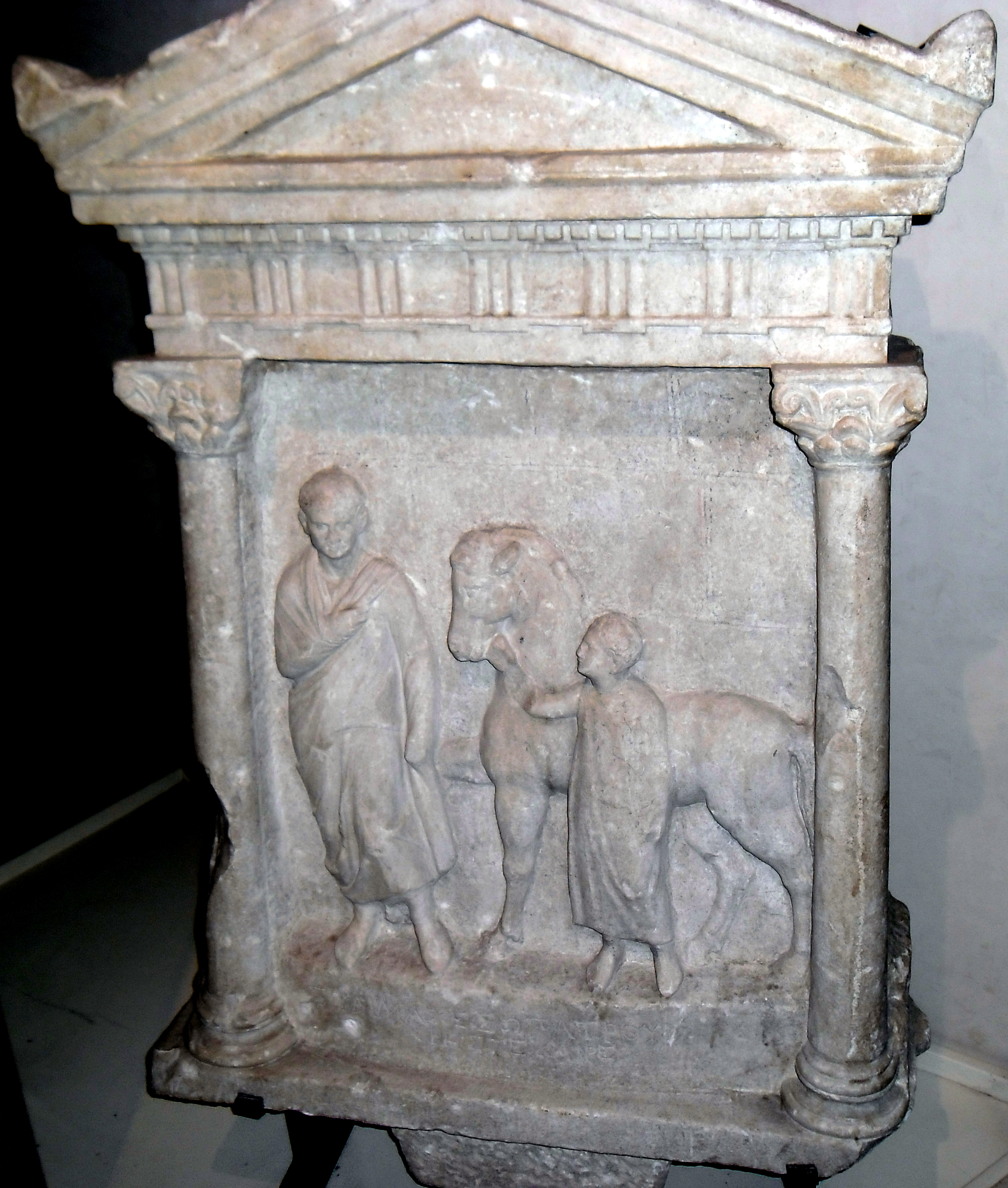

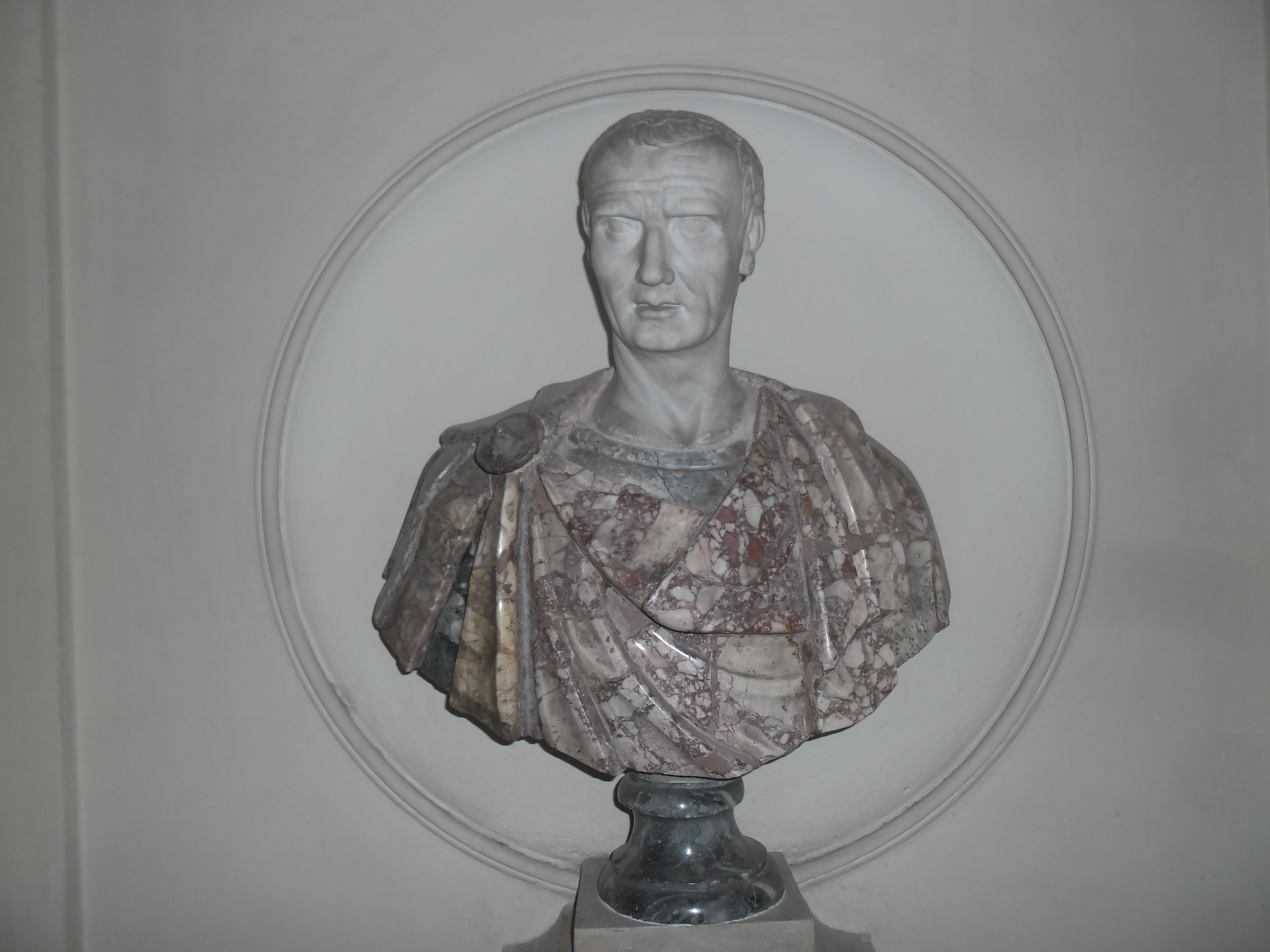
