= World Association of Detectives =

World Association of Detectives (W.A.D.)
- World Association of Detectives logo

- Location within the United States
- Headquarters: Evans
- Location: Colorado, US
- Coordinates: 40.381340311738825°N 104.69410912028678°W
- Key people: Richard Jacques-Turner (Past President)
- Website: www.wad.net

The World Association of Detectives (W.A.D.) was founded in 1925. It is the International Association for Private Investigators and Security Service Organizations. The World Association of Detectives was formed as a joint venture by the combined membership of the World Association of Detectives and the International Secret Service Association. It is the oldest international association in its field. In 1972, it had 400 members in 34 countries, growing to over 700 in about 60 countries in 1997. In 2020, it had nearly 1,000 members in over 80 countries.
