= Nacona =

Ancient Greek town of Sicily

Coordinates: 37.356922°N 14.290069°E

Onkia
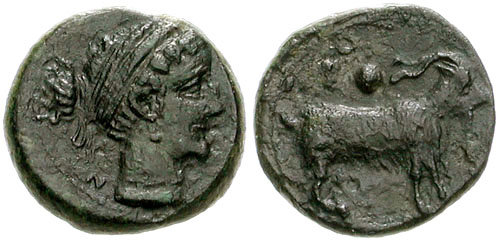
First side of the image: [NA-KO]-N[AION] Female head right, wearing hair band
Second side of the image: Goat right; pellet above, grain-ear before..
Æ Onkia (11mm, 1.12 g).

Nacona or Nakona (Greek: Νακώνη), was a small ancient Greek town of Sicily mentioned only by Stephanus of Byzantium, who cites Philistus as his authority.

The site is probably that at Monte Navone.

The accuracy of the name is confirmed by coins, the earliest of which bear the legend "NAKONAION", while those of later date have "ΝΑΚΩΝΑΙΩΝ". From one of the latter we learn that the town had been occupied by the Campanians, apparently at the same period with Aetna and Entella.

The city lies along an E/W axis with a still recognisable street.

The necropolis included Corinthian or Attic vases and locally made pottery of Licodia type.
