= Semuncia =

Ancient Roman coin

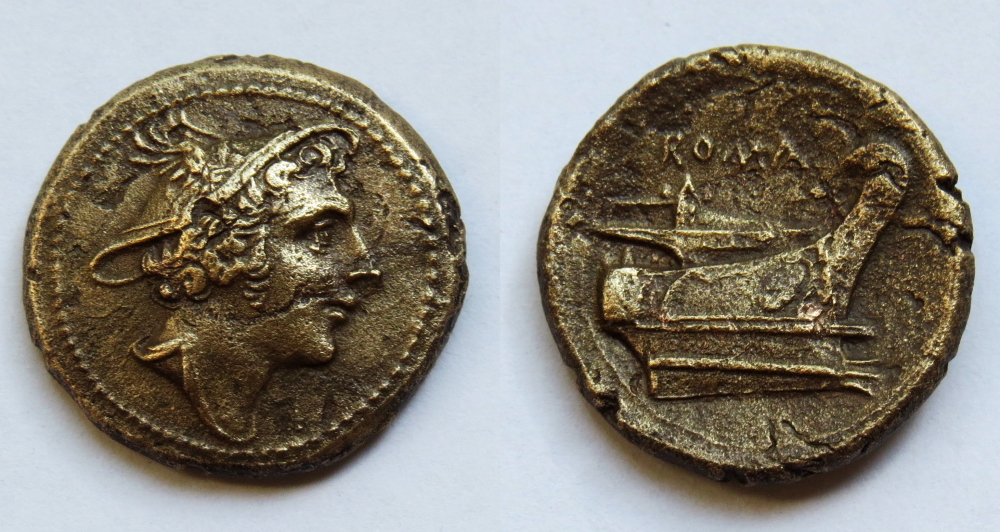
Roman semuncia, c. 215–211 BC

The semuncia was an ancient Roman bronze coin valued at one twenty-fourth of an as, or half an uncia, produced during the Roman Republican era. It was made during the beginning of Roman cast bronze coinage as the lowest valued denomination.

The most common obverse types were a head of Mercury or an acorn, and the most common reverse types were a prow or a caduceus. It was issued until about 210 BC, at about the same time as the denarius was introduced.

== Bibliography ==
- Sear, D. R. (2000). The Republic and the twelve Caesars, 280 BC–AD 96. Roman coins and their values. Vol. 1. London: Spink. ISBN 9781902040356.
