= Three valli of Sicily =

Historical divisions of Sicily

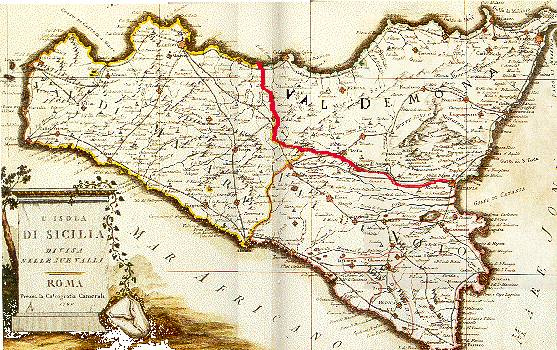
Historical map of Sicily showing the three provinces or valli

During the Muslim rule on Sicily, the island was divided into three different administrative regions: the Val di Noto in the southeast, the Val Demone in the northeast and the Val di Mazara in the west. Each zone has a noticeably different agriculture and topography and they converged near Castrogiovanni (Enna). The term val or vallo (plural: valli) is derived from Arabic (Siculo Arabic: وَلاية, romanized: walāya; compare وَلِيّ, waliyy), with the administrative meaning of 'province', and was retained for various administrative divisions of the Kingdom of Sicily until the 19th century.

There are many Arab-derived names in the Val di Mazara (and more Christians converted to Islam from this region), are more mixed in the Val di Noto, while Christian (particularly Greek) identities survived strongest in the Val Demone (with the least Arab-derived names), which was the last to fall to the Muslims, where Christian refugees from other parts of Sicily had assembled, and which furthermore remained in contact with Byzantine southern Italy. Even in present-day Sicily, differences between the east and west of the island are often explained by locals as being due to the Greek and Arab descent of the populations, respectively. Later Christian Lombard settlements would split the remaining Muslims of Sicily in half, separating the Val di Mazara and the Val di Noto.

Even after Muslim rule, the three valli system was still continued up until 1818, when Sicily was divided into seven provinces. From the 16–17th century, the population of Val di Noto expanded the most slowly of the three valli, with Val di Mazara growing the fastest.

The three valli are represented by the three-legged Trinacria symbol, which appears on the flag of Sicily.

== See also ==
- Muslim conquest of Sicily
