= Free Sicilians =

Italian political party

Free Sicilians Siciliani Liberi
- President: Carmelo Sardella
- Secretary: Ciro Lomonte
- Founded: 3 January 2016
- Headquarters: Palazzo Pantelleria Varvaro, Piazza Giovanni Meli n°5, 90133 Palermo
- Ideology: Sicilian nationalism Separatism; Souverainism; Regionalism
- Political position: Big tent
- National affiliation: Autonomies and Environment Pact
- European affiliation: European Free Alliance
- Colours: Yellow
- Chamber of Deputies: 0 / 400
- Senate: 0 / 205
- European Parliament: 0 / 76
- Sicilian Regional Assembly: 0 / 70

Website
- sicilianiliberi.org

Free Sicilians (Italian: Siciliani Liberi; Sicilian: Siciliani Libbiri; SL) is a Sicilian nationalist and pro-independence political party. The party was founded in 2016 in order to revive the island's right to self-government.

== History ==
Free Sicilians was founded by Massimo Costa, Antonella Pititto and Enzo Cassata. The party was launched on 3 January 2016 during a meeting in Pergusa. On the same occasion, the economist Massimo Costa, professor at the University of Palermo, became president of the party.

Free Sicilians took part in the local elections for the first time in the spring of 2017, presenting its own mayoral candidate and its own electoral list in Palermo, capital of Sicily. Ciro Lomonte, an architect and scholar of the Salingaros Group, was chosen as mayoral candidate. During his electoral campaign, Lomonte focused on the issues of the urban renewal, the identity revival of Palermo and the violations of the Statute of Sicily by the Italian Government. Lomonte gained 4787 votes (1,76%), while the list gained 4041 votes (1,71%).

Roberto La Rosa, a lawyer and former deputy secretary of the Sicilian National Front, was chosen as presidential candidate for the 2017 regional election. Free Sicilians was the only pro-independence party competing for the Sicilian Regional Assembly in 2017. "Economic independence" was the key concept of the electoral campaign. According to the party's program, this key concept would be pursued through the adoption of the special economic zone and a complementary currency called Tarì, like the ancient coin of the Kingdom of Sicily. During the campaign, La Rosa also suggested the creation of the Sicilian national football team as other autonomous regions and unrecognised states did before Sicily. La Rosa gained 14,656 votes (0.70%), while the list gained 12,600 votes (0.66%).

In December 2017 Ciro Lomonte was chosen as provisional secretary until the first Congress of the party.

== Ideology ==
Free Sicilians believes that Sicily is a European stateless nation with its own political history, language, culture, traditions and national identity. The party describes the current political and economic condition of Sicily as a case of internal colonialism. In particular, Free Sicilians complains the persistent non-implementation of the Autonomous Statute of Sicily and, for this reason, aims to gradually achieve the full independence of the island in order to create a sovereign state. The party describes its ideology as "souverainist", in opposition to the excesses of globalization.

== International relations ==
The responsible for the international relations of Free Sicilians is Alfonso Nobile delegate for relations with European Free Alliance. On February and March 2018, Free Sicilians hosted the first delegations of Catalan nationalist parties (Estat Català, Esquerra Republicana) at its headquarters in Palermo.

In December 2017 Free Sicilians has congratulated the Corsican nationalist alliance Pè a Corsica for the success in the Corsican territorial election.

In 2018 and 2019, the party entered in dialogue and collaboration with many other similar movements, in other territories of the Italian Republic and European Union, namely Comitato Libertà Toscana (Committee Liberty Tuscany), along with Patto per l'Autonomia (Pact for Self-government) and Patrie Furlane (Friulian Home), which are active in Friuli-Venetia Giulia region.

== Electoral results ==
=== Regional elections ===
Election	Votes	%	Seats	+/−
2017	12,600 (#12)	0.66	0 / 70	New
2022	7,654 (#13)	0.52	0 / 70	0

== Leadership ==
- President: Massimo Costa (2016–2017), Armando Melodia (2018 - 2021), Gianluca Castriciano (2021 - 2022), Carmelo Sardella (2022 - 2023), Ciro Lomonte (2024 - present)
  - Deputy President: Antonella Pititto (2016–2018)
- Secretary: Ciro Lomonte (2017– 2024), Eliana Esposito (2024 - present)
  - Deputy Secretary: Marco Lo Dico (2021– 2024)
