= Siceliotes =

Ancient Greek ethno-cultural group of Sicily

Greek colonies of Magna Graecia and Hellenic Sicily

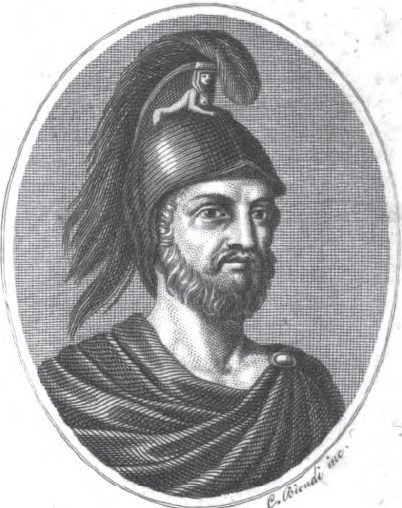
Philistus, Siceliote historian

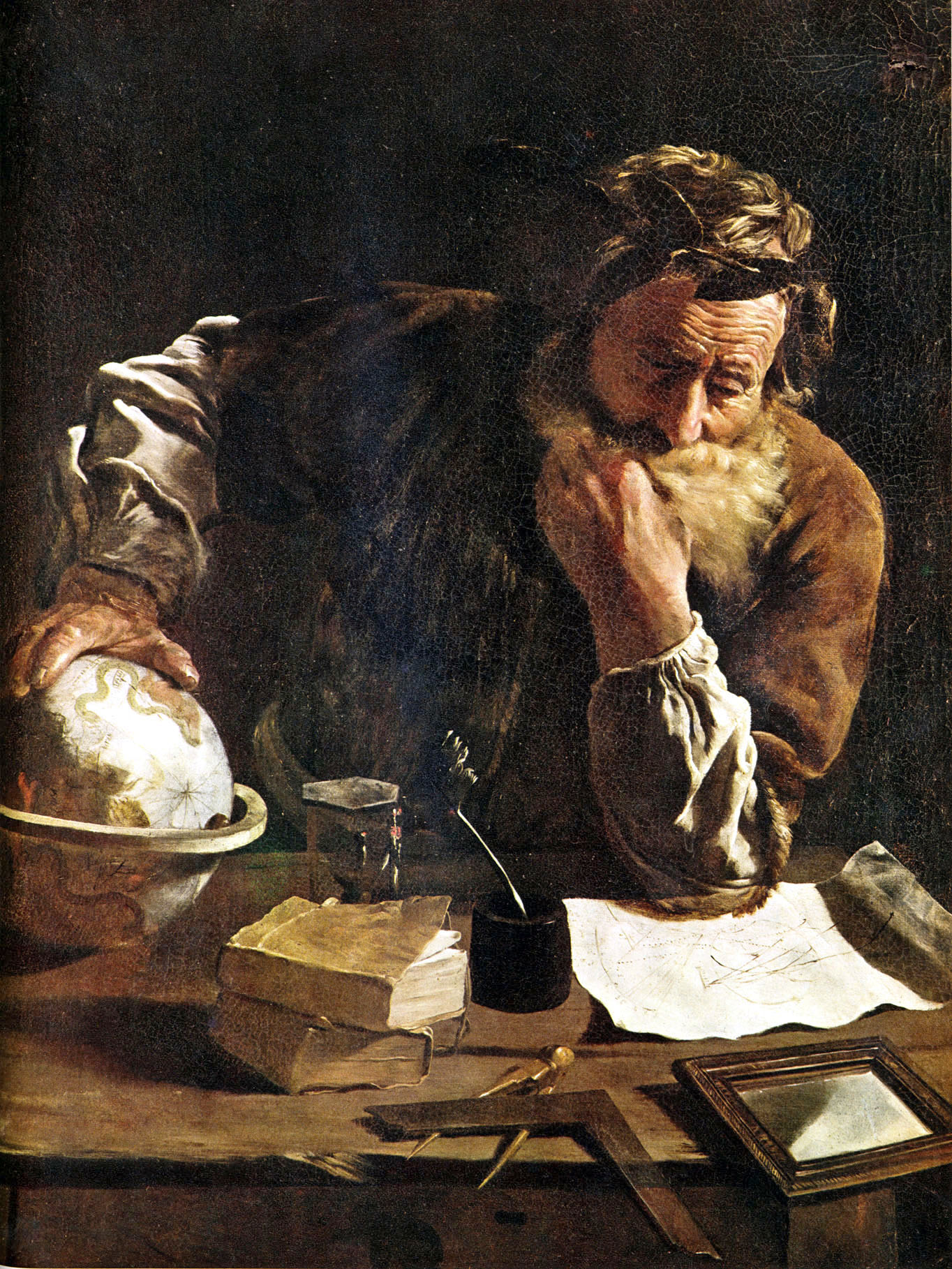
Archimedes Thoughtful by Domenico Fetti (1620)

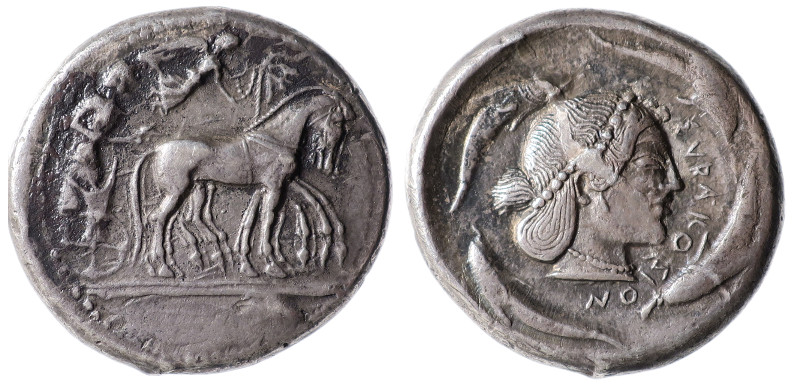
Syracusan Arethusa Tetradrachm Coin

The Siceliot people (pl. Siceliots or Siceliotes, Σικελιῶται in Ancient Greek) formed a distinct ethno-cultural group in Sicily from about the 8th century BC until their assimilation into the general Sicilian population. As Hellenic colonists (often reputedly of Doric origin) and descendants of colonists from Greece, they spoke Greek and participated in the wider cultural and political activities of Greek Sicily and of the Hellenic world as a whole. The Athenian historian Thucydides mentions them in various places in his "History of the Peloponnesian War".

The Roman Republic and the Roman Empire continued to see a distinction between the Siceliotes (the descendants of Greek settlers) and the non-Greek inhabitants of Sicily.

Siceliotes are a distinguishable subethnicity of the broader Italiote ethno-cultural group.

During the Congress of Gela, according to the testimony of Thucydides, Hermocrates, declaring the independence of the Sicelian people, said:

«"It is no disgrace that fellow countrymen make concessions to fellow countrymen: Dorians to other Dorians and Chalcidians to others of the same race; and that in general concessions are made to neighboring peoples who inhabit the same identical land surrounded by the sea, and who by one name are called Siceliots.[...]» (Thucydides IV, 64.3, Italian translation by Luciano Canfora - English translation)

The idyllic image that ancient historiography has given of the arrival of the Greeks on the island is far from what was in truth a coexistence that was anything but peaceful, characterized by the oppression of the natives, by the "economic and political, but also cultural and ideological pressure exerted by the colonizers, and the consequent dismantling of the parameters of self-identification of the indigenous world"

== Literature ==
The contribution to literature made by the Siceliotes was remarkable. In fact, some genres of Greek literature developed in Sicily: according to Aristotle, the technique of constructing plots was born in Sicily and the Doric-Siceliote comedy itself, whose main exponents were Epicharmus of Kos and Phormis, served as a model for the subsequent Attic Greek comedy of the 5th century BC.

Theatre in Sicily was not limited to comedy alone: Sophron of Syracuse is credited with the invention of Greek mime (μῖμος), which had considerable success in the Hellenistic age, especially with Theocritus, who in turn invented bucolic poetry. Phrynichus and Aeschylus died in Sicily, the first considered "the most famous of the first tragedians", the second listed among the three greatest tragedians of ancient Greek theatre; Aeschylus also performed some of his tragedies in the Syracuse theatre, including The Persians, the oldest surviving Greek tragedy.

He was part of the court of intellectuals that surrounded the Syracuse tyrant Hiero II, which included, among others, the lyric poets Pindar, Bacchylides, Simonides of Ceos and Xenophanes. The lyric poets Theognis of Megara and Stesichorus were also active in Sicily; Sappho spent ten years of exile there. According to some scholars, choral lyric poetry itself may have been born in Sicily.

Another great Sicilian innovation was rhetoric: the first manuals of this, in fact, are attributed to the Syracusans Corax and Tisias. Diogenes Laertius considered Empedocles as one of the most important pre-Socratic philosophers, to be the inventor of rhetoric: among his students was Gorgias, one of the first sophists, who together with Polus of Agrigento (his student) and Tisias introduced the art of rhetoric to Athens from Sicily.

== Siceliote City-States ==
- Syrakousai
- Gela
- Selinunte
- Zancle
- Naxos
- Himera
- Calacte
- Leontinoi
- Katane
- Kamarina
- Acragas
- Heraclea Minoa

== See also ==
- Greek coinage of Italy and Sicily
