= Movement for the Independence of Sicily =

Separatist political party in the Italian island of Sicily (1943–51)

Movement for the Independence of Sicily Movimento per l'Indipendenza della Sicilia
- Abbreviation: MIS
- Leader: Andrea Finocchiaro Aprile
- Founded: 10 July 1943
- Dissolved: 4 June 1951
- Headquarters: Palermo
- Ideology: Sicilian nationalism Separatism; Regionalism

Party flag

The Movement for the Independence of Sicily (Italian: Movimento per l'Indipendenza della Sicilia, Sicilian: Muvimentu pâ Nnipinnenza dâ Sicilia, MIS) was a separatist Sicilian political party originally active in Sicily from 1943 to 1951. Its best electoral result was in 1947, when it won 8.8% of the votes in the Sicilian regional election and had nine regional deputies elected.

The party was supported by Sicilians from a very wide range of political stances: both conservatives and socialists were involved at some point. The purpose was first to gain independence for Sicily, and once this was accomplished MIS planned to sort out the politics of the island themselves, with the movement splintering to found new Sicilian political parties with their own personal stances.

== History ==
The movement was founded in September 1942 as the Committee for the Independence of Sicily (Comitato per l'Indipendenza della Sicilia, CIS) finding inspiration in the Sicilian Vespers, with Andrea Finocchiaro Aprile serving as its first president. The movement included members of very different political views, such as revolutionary socialist Antonio Canepa, social-democrat Giovanni Guarino Amella, right-wing people, most of them aristocrats, such as baron Lucio Tasca and duke Guglielmo Paternò, and members with close ties to the Mafia, as well as outright Mafiosi such as Calogero Vizzini.

The movement gained presence and support following the Armistice of Cassibile of 8 September 1943, which forced Italy to abandon the island, while the U.S. troops still were on the verge of completing the military occupation of Sicily. In October 1943, Finocchiaro Aprile asked the King of Italy Victor Emmanuel III to abdicate, and successively gained support to his cause from about ten Sicilian deputies. In the spring of 1944, the CIS was disbanded and the Movement for the Independence of Sicily (MIS) was founded. During those days, the Allies prohibited any kind of political activity, but tolerated the existence of the MIS. Several politicians with strong ties with the Mafia, such as Calogero Vizzini and Calogero Volpe, joined the MIS; however, all of them soon later left the MIS in order to join the newborn Italian parties, such as the Christian Democracy.

In the fall of 1944, during the first congress held in Taormina, the MIS decided to arm itself under pushes from its more radical members. The EVIS (Esercito Volontario per l'Indipendenza della Sicilia, Volunteer Army for the Independence of Sicily) was founded, and its operations led the Italian central government to send its troops in Sicily. On 17 June 1945, following an armed clash with the Carabinieri near Randazzo, Antonio Canepa, head of the EVIS, was killed along with his companions Carmelo Rosano and Giuseppe Lo Giudice.

After the end of World War II, a special council started working on a special autonomy statute for Sicily, which was approved by King Umberto II of Italy by Royal Legislative Decree No. 455 on 15 May 1946, and was finally converted into a constitutional law by the Italian parliament on 26 February 1948. The bandit Salvatore Giuliano joined the movement and was given the rank of Colonel in the EVIS.

In the 1946 general election, MIS obtained 0.7% of national votes (8.8% of votes in Sicily), and four seats, including its leader Finocchiaro Aprile. During the 1947 congress, Antonino Varvaro, former secretary and leading member of the left wing, was expelled from the party by a majority. The reasons remained unclear. Following these events, Varvaro founded a rival independentist movement, MISDR, which did not achieve much success and disbanded soon. In the first Sicilian elections held in 1947, MIS obtained about 9% of votes, and eight seats. However, the movement lost all its seats following the 1948 general election and the 1951 regional election. Soon after the latter, Finocchiaro Aprile and several other members resigned from MIS and the movement entered into a sort of political hiatus, never being formally disbanded.

=== Sicilian Independence Movement today ===
The Sicilian independence movement continued to live thanks to Rosario Fasanaro, historical independence pioneer of the movement in Catania, then Regional Secretary until 27 January 2004, the year of his death.

On 22 April 2004 an association was formed called Movimento per l'Indipendenza della Sicilia, which refers directly to the experience of the MIS of the 1940s. On 11 May 2009, during a press conference, the leaders of the Movement gave the honorary member card to the then President of the Sicilian Region Raffaele Lombardo with the following motivation: "For having placed himself at the service of the 'autonomist cause' and for helping to awaken the identity and pride of the Sicilian People", fearing the hypothesis of an alliance with the Movement for Autonomies, of which Lombardo himself is the leader. The alliance was not followed through.

In November 2016, a new name was created, Movimento Nazionale Siciliano, between three Sicilian groups: Movimento per l'Indipendenza della Sicilia, Fronte Nazionale Siciliano, and Sicilia Nazione. The new alliance did not present its own lists in the regional elections of November 2017.

The independentist Massimo Cirano, belonging to the "Archimedes Section" of the MIS, presented his symbol and list at the April 2019 administrative elections in the municipality of Bagheria.

== Symbols ==
- The Sicilian Independence Movement has the Trinacria as its symbol.
- The movement uses the so-called Three-finger salute, that represents the Trinacria's three legs.
- Colors red and yellow.

== Electoral results ==
=== Italian Constitutional Assembly ===
Election	Leader	Constituent Assembly				
Election	Leader	Votes	%	Seats	+/–	Position
1946	Andrea Finocchiaro Aprile	171,201	0.7	4 / 556	▲4	▲9th

=== Sicilian Regional Assembly ===
Election	Leader	Sicilian Regional Assembly				
Election	Leader	Votes	%	Seats	+/–	Position
1947	Andrea Finocchiaro Aprile	171,470	8.8	9 / 90	▲9	▲5th

== General and cited sources ==
- Costanzo, Ezio (2005). Mafia & Alleati (in Italian). Catania: Le Nove Muse Editrice. pp. 256+photos+documents.
- Gaja, Filippo (1962). L'esercito della Lupara (in Italian). Milan: Maquis Editore. p. 404. OCLC 3095666.
- Villari, Gianfilippo (2004). La Sicilia libertata (in Italian). Catania: Maimone Editore. p. 306. ISBN 88-7751-253-9.
- Marino, Giuseppe Carlo (1993). Storia del separatismo siciliano. 1943-1947 (in Italian). Rome: Editori Riuniti. p. 307. ISBN 88-359-3709-4.
- Spataro, Mario (2001). I primi secessionisti: separatismo in Sicilia 1866 e 1943-46 (in Italian). Rome: Controcorrente. p. 371. OCLC 48108005.
- Paternò Castello, Francesco (1977). Il movimento per l'indipendenza della Sicilia: memorie (in Italian). Palermo: Flaccovio. p. 371. OCLC 4230210.
- Finkelstein, Monte S. (1998). Separatism, the Allies and the Mafia: The Struggle for Sicilian Independence, 1943-1948. Bethlehem, Pennsylvania: Lehigh University Press. p. 289. ISBN 978-0-934223-51-5. OCLC 44965140.
- Lewis, Norman (2003). The Honoured Society: The Sicilian Mafia Observed. Eland Publishing Ltd. ISBN 978-0-907871-48-4.
