= Andrea Finocchiaro Aprile =

Italian politician (1878–1964)

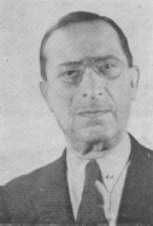
Andrea Finocchiaro Aprile

Andrea Finocchiaro Aprile (26 June 1878 – 14 January 1964) was an Italian politician and leader of the Movement for the Independence of Sicily political party.

== Biography ==
He was born in Lercara Friddi, Sicily, on 26 June 1878 as the son of Camillo Finocchiaro Aprile, a liberal politician and several times minister, and the Sicilian noblewoman Giovanna Sartorio. He was the nephew of Giulio Sartorio, mayor of Lercara Friddi. His brother was Emanuele Finocchiaro Aprile, also a Deputy during the Kingdom of Italy.

Andrea Finocchiaro Aprile was a professor of "history of law" at the University of Ferrara and the University of Siena.

He began his political activity with the election as deputy to the Chamber of Deputies in 1913 as a liberal, following in his father's footsteps. Re-elected in 1919 with the Democratic Social Party, he was appointed Undersecretary for War in the Nitti I Cabinet until 1920 and Undersecretary for Finance in the Nitti II Cabinet. Re-elected also in 1921, he opposed the nascent fascist regime as a Freemason, and in 1924 he ran on the lists of Giovanni Amendola's National Union, but this time he was not re-elected.

He retired from active politics in 1925 and returned to practice as a lawyer.

In 1936 he expressed his consent to the Ethiopian war and the union of Albania with Italy. In the winter of 1942, he contacted exponents of Sicilian pre-fascist politics. He officially returned to politics in June 1943, a few days before the landing of the Allies in Sicily, launching in Palermo an appeal with an Action Committee for passive resistance against fascist Italy. This committee became the original nucleus of the Movement for the Independence of Sicily (MIS). He also maintained close contact with the British and US secret services, and therefore with the Amgot, to support the separatist cause.

He authorized the birth of the Voluntary Army for the Independence of Sicily (EVIS) in 1944. That year he escaped an attack during a demonstration organized by the MIS in Regalbuto but, in the same year, he was arrested for order of the Bonomi government. The MIS in 1944 came to count almost half a million members. He returned free in 1945 but, in October of the same year, he was arrested again with his right arm Antonino Varvaro and sent to political confinement in Ponza, where he remained until March 1946.

In June 1946 he was elected deputy to the Constituent Assembly on the lists of the MIS. In 1947 the partnership with Varvaro dissolved due to serious differences on the conception of the party. The secretary wanted the movement to take a precise political position, in the case in point on the left, while Finocchiaro Aprile considered it transversal to any ideology. In the III national congress of Taormina, Varvaro was expelled from the MIS also due to pressure from the "right-wing" fringe (Tasca–Carcaci).

In May 1947 he was elected deputy to the Sicilian Regional Assembly, from which he resigned in March 1948, to run again for the Chamber of Deputies, but he was not elected. He therefore decided to leave the MIS which - after losing all national and regional parliamentary representation - dissolved in 1951.

In 1953 he accepted, without being elected, to stand for the general election among the ranks of the National Democratic Alliance. Subsequently, he was appointed judge of the High Court for the Sicilian Region. He died in Palermo on 14 January 1964.
