= Elections in Italy =

National-level elections in Italy are called periodically to form a parliament consisting of two houses: the Chamber of Deputies (Camera dei Deputati) with 400 members; and the Senate of the Republic (Senato della Repubblica) with 200 elected members, plus a few appointed senators for life. Italy is a parliamentary republic: the President of the Republic is elected for a seven-year term by the two houses of Parliament in joint session, together with special electors appointed by the Regional Councils.

Italy had a mixed-member majoritarian system in place between 1993 and 2005. The 2006 elections were the first elections conducted under a closed-list proportional system rather than a mixed system.

The most recent Italian general election was held on 25 September 2022.

== 2022 general election ==
The last general election was held on 25 September 2022.

The centre-right coalition, in which Giorgia Meloni's Brothers of Italy emerged as the main political force, won an absolute majority of seats in the Chamber of Deputies and in the Senate of the Republic. The centre-left coalition, the anti-establishment Five Star Movement and the centrist Action - Italia Viva came in second, third and fourth respectively.

=== Chamber of Deputies ===
Coalition	Party	Proportional			First-past-the-post			Aosta Valley			Overseas			Total seats
Coalition	Party	Votes	%	Seats	Votes	%	Seats	Votes	%	Seats	Votes	%	Seats	Total seats
Centre-right coalition (Italy)	Brothers of Italy	7,302,517	26.00	69	12,300,244	43.79	49	16,016	28.80	0	281,949	26.00	1	119
Centre-right coalition (Italy)	Lega (political party)	2,464,005	8.77	23	12,300,244	43.79	42	16,016	28.80	0	281,949	26.00	1	66
Centre-right coalition (Italy)	Forza Italia (2013)	2,278,217	8.11	22	12,300,244	43.79	23	16,016	28.80	0	281,949	26.00	0	45
Centre-right coalition (Italy)	Us Moderates	255,505	0.91	0	12,300,244	43.79	7	16,016	28.80	0	0	0	0	7
Centre-left coalition (Italy)	Democratic Party – Democratic and Progressive Italy	5,356,180	19.07	57	7,337,975	26.13	8	0	0	0	305,759	28.20	4	69
Centre-left coalition (Italy)	Greens and Left Alliance	1,018,669	3.63	11	7,337,975	26.13	1	0	0	0	52,994	4.89	0	12
Centre-left coalition (Italy)	More Europe	793,961	2.83	0	7,337,975	26.13	2	0	0	0	29,971	2.76	0	2
Centre-left coalition (Italy)	Civic Commitment	169,165	0.60	0	7,337,975	26.13	1	0	0	0	11,590	1.07	0	1
Five Star Movement		4,333,972	15.43	41	4,333,972	15.43	10	0	0	0	93,338	8.61	1	52
Action – Italia Viva		2,186,669	7.79	21	2,186,669	7.79	0	0	0	0	60,499	5.58	0	21
South Tyrolean People's Party – PATT		117,010	0.42	1	117,010	0.42	2	0	0	0	0	0	0	3
South calls North		212,685	0.76	0	212,685	0.76	1	0	0	0	0	0	0	1
Aosta Valley (political coalition)		0	0	0	0	0	0	20,763	38.63	1	0	0	0	1
Associative Movement of Italians Abroad		0	0	0	0	0	0	0	0	0	141,356	13.04	1	1
Others		1,599,227	5.68	0	1,599,227	5.68	0	16,967	32.57	0	106,847	9.85	0	0
Total		28,087,782	100.00	245	28,087,782	100.00	146	53,746	100.00	1	1,084,303	100.00	8	400

=== Senate of the Republic ===
Coalition	Party	Proportional			First-past-the-post			Aosta Valley			Trentino-Alto Adige			Overseas			Total seats
Coalition	Party	Votes	%	Seats	Votes	%	Seats	Votes	%	Seats	Votes	%	Seats	Votes	%	Seats	Total seats
Centre-right coalition (Italy)	Brothers of Italy	7,167,136	26.01	34	12,129,547	44.02	31	18,509	34.05	0	137,015	27.24	0	294,712	27.05	0	65
Centre-right coalition (Italy)	Lega (political party)	2,439,200	8.85	13	12,129,547	44.02	14	18,509	34.05	1	137,015	27.24	1	294,712	27.05	0	29
Centre-right coalition (Italy)	Forza Italia (2013)	2,279,802	8.27	9	12,129,547	44.02	9	18,509	34.05	0	137,015	27.24	0	294,712	27.05	0	18
Centre-right coalition (Italy)	Us Moderates	243,409	0.88	0	12,129,547	44.02	2	18,509	34.05	0	137,015	27.24	1	0	0	0	3
Centre-left coalition (Italy)	Democratic Party – Democratic and Progressive Italy	5,226,732	18.96	31	7,161,688	25.99	4	0	0	0	149,682	29,29	1	370,262	33.98	3	39
Centre-left coalition (Italy)	Greens and Left Alliance	972,316	3.53	3	7,161,688	25.99	1	0	0	0	149,682	29,29	0	0	0	0	4
Centre-left coalition (Italy)	Campobase	0	0	0	7,161,688	25.99	0	0	0	0	149,682	29,29	1	0	0	0	1
Centre-left coalition (Italy)	Others	972,214	3.53	0	7,161,688	25.99	0	0	0	0	149,682	29,29	0	14,610	1.34	0	0
Five Star Movement		4,285,894	15.55	23	4,285,894	15.55	5	0	0	0	28,355	5.64	0	101,794	9.34	0	28
Action – Italia Viva		2,131,310	7.73	9	2,131,310	7.73	0	0	0	0	6,782	1.35	0	76,070	6.98	0	9
South Tyrolean People's Party – PATT		0	0	0	0	0	0	0	0	0	116,003	23.06	2	0	0	0	2
South calls North		271,549	0.99	0	271,549	0.99	1	0	0	0	0	0	0	0	0	0	1
Associative Movement of Italians Abroad		0	0	0	0	0	0	0	0	0	0	0	0	138,758	12.73	1	1
Others		2,119,823	5,72	0	2,119,823	5,72	0	35,850	65.95	0	65.117	13.42	0	93,107	8.54	0	0
Total		27,569,675	100.00	122	27,569,675	100.00	67	54,359	100.00	1	502,954	100.00	6	1,090,147	100.00	4	200

== Italian Republic general election results voter turnout ==
Year	Voter turnout	Voters	Registered voters	Population	Invalid votes
1946	89.08%	24,947,187	28,005,449	44,994,000	7.70%
1948	92.23%	26,854,203	29,117,554	45,706,000	2.20%
1953	93.87%	28,410,851	30,267,080	47,756,000	4.30%
1958	93.72%	30,399,708	32,436,022	49,041,000	2.80%
1963	92.88%	31,766,058	34,201,660	50,498,000	3.20%
1968	92.79%	33,003,249	35,566,681	52,910,000	3.60%
1972	93.18%	34,524,106	37,049,654	54,410,000	3.20%
1976	93.37%	37,741,404	40,423,131	55,701,000	2.70%
1979	90.35%	38,112,228	42,181,664	56,292,000	3.90%
1983	89.02%	39,114,321	43,936,534	56,836,000	5.70%
1987	88.86%	40,599,490	45,689,829	57,345,000	4.90%
1992	87.44%	41,479,764	47,435,964	56,859,000	5.40%
1994	86.14%	41,461,260	48,135,041	57,049,000	5.90%
1996	82.91%	40,496,438	48,846,238	57,239,000	7.80%
2001	81.44%	40,195,500	49,358,947	57,684,294	7.20%
2006	83.62%	39,298,497	46,997,601	58,103,033	2.90%
2008	80.54%	37,954,253	47,126,326	58,147,733	5.10%
2013	75.19%	35,271,541	46,905,154	61,482,297	3.59%
2018	72.93%	33,923,321	46,505,499	60,589,445	4.33%
2022	63.85%	29,385,111	46,021,956	58,983,000	4.38%

== Graph of the results of the Italian Republic general elections ==
This graph shows the results of elections held in Italy from 1946 to 2018, with the percentages of consensus gathered by the various parties and movements displayed by color. Passing your mouse over the different colored sections will display the name of the grouping and the percentage in the corresponding election. Clicking on a region will direct you to the article on the party or election selected.

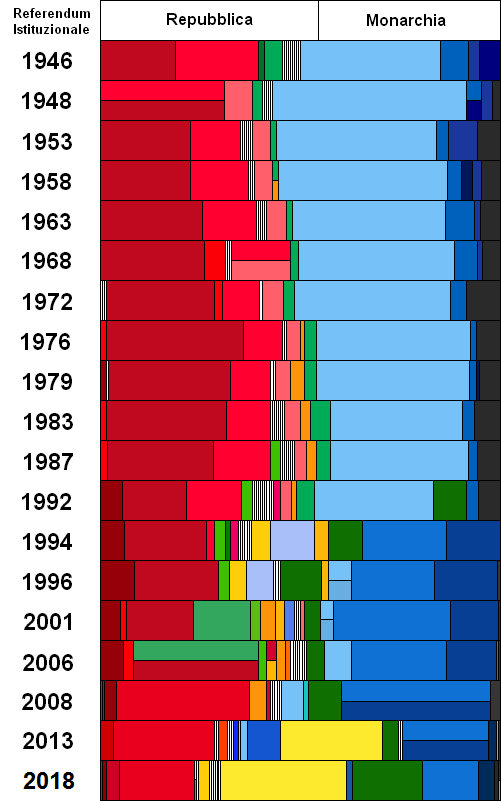
Graph of Italian general elections

This other graph shows, instead, the elections from 1946 to 2022 relative to the total eligible voters; providing an illustration of the phenomenon of electoral abstentionism.

Italian general elections (1946-2022) Source

== List of presidential elections ==
=== Provisional Head of State ===
- 1946 Italian presidential election
- 1947 Italian presidential election

=== President of the Republic ===
- 1948 Italian presidential election
- 1955 Italian presidential election
- 1962 Italian presidential election
- 1964 Italian presidential election
- 1971 Italian presidential election
- 1978 Italian presidential election
- 1985 Italian presidential election
- 1992 Italian presidential election
- 1999 Italian presidential election
- 2006 Italian presidential election
- 2013 Italian presidential election
- 2015 Italian presidential election
- 2022 Italian presidential election

== List of general elections ==
=== Kingdom of Italy ===
- 27 January–3 February 1861 Italian general election
- 22–29 October 1865 Italian general election
- 10–17 March 1867 Italian general election
- 20–27 November 1870 Italian general election
- 8–15 November 1874 Italian general election
- 5–12 November 1876 Italian general election
- 16–23 May 1880 Italian general election
- 29 October–5 November 1882 Italian general election
- 23–30 May 1886 Italian general election
- 23–30 November 1890 Italian general election
- 6–13 November 1892 Italian general election
- 26 May–2 June 1895 Italian general election
- 21–28 March 1897 Italian general election
- 3–10 June 1900 Italian general election
- 6–13 November 1904 Italian general election
- 7–14 March 1909 Italian general election
- 26 October–2 November 1913 Italian general election
- 16 November 1919 Italian general election
- 15 May 1921 Italian general election
- 6 April 1924 Italian general election
- 24 March 1929 Italian general election
- 25 March 1934 Italian general election

=== Italian Republic ===
- 2–3 June 1946 Italian general election
- 18 April 1948 Italian general election
- 7 June 1953 Italian general election
- 25 May 1958 Italian general election
- 28 April 1963 Italian general election
- 19 May 1968 Italian general election
- 7 May 1972 Italian general election
- 20 June 1976 Italian general election
- 3 June 1979 Italian general election
- 26 June 1983 Italian general election
- 14–15 June 1987 Italian general election
- 5–6 April 1992 Italian general election
- 27–28 March 1994 Italian general election
- 21 April 1996 Italian general election
- 13 May 2001 Italian general election
- 9–10 April 2006 Italian general election
- 13–14 April 2008 Italian general election
- 24–25 February 2013 Italian general election
- 4 March 2018 Italian general election
- 25 September 2022 Italian general election

== List of European Parliament elections ==
- 10 June 1979 European Parliament election in Italy
- 17 June 1984 European Parliament election in Italy
- 18 June 1989 European Parliament election in Italy
- 12 June 1994 European Parliament election in Italy
- 13 June 1999 European Parliament election in Italy
- 13 June 2004 European Parliament election in Italy
- 6–7 June 2009 European Parliament election in Italy
- 25 May 2014 European Parliament election in Italy
- 26 May 2019 European Parliament election in Italy
- 8-9 June 2024 European Parliament election in Italy

== List of regional elections ==
- 20 April 1947 Sicilian regional election
- 24 April–8 May 1949 Italian regional elections
- 3 June 1951 Sicilian regional election
- 14 June 1953 Sardinian regional election
- 6 November 1954 Valdostan regional election
- 5 June 1955 Sicilian regional election
- 16 June 1957 Sardinian regional election
- 17 May–7 June 1959 Italian regional elections
- 18 June 1961 Sardinian regional election
- 9 June–27 October 1963 Italian regional elections
- 10 May–15 November 1964 Italian regional elections
- 13 June 1965 Sardinian regional election
- 11 June 1967 Sicilian regional election
- 21 April and 26 May and 17 November 1968 Italian regional elections
- 15 June 1969 Sardinian regional election
- 7–8 June 1970 Italian regional elections
- 13 June 1971 Sicilian regional election
- 10 June–17 June and 18 November1973 Italian regional elections
- 16 June 1974 Sardinian regional election
- 15–16 June 1975 Italian regional elections
- 20 June 1976 Sicilian regional election
- 25 June and 19 November 1978 Italian regional elections
- 17 June 1979 Sardinian regional election
- 8–9 June 1980 Italian regional elections
- 21 June 1981 Sicilian regional election
- 26 June and 20 November 1983 Italian regional elections
- 24 June 1984 Sardinian regional election
- 12–13 May 1985 Italian regional elections
- 22 June 1986 Sicilian regional election
- 26–27 June and 20 November 1988 Italian regional elections
- 11 June 1989 Sardinian regional election
- 6–7 May 1990 Italian regional elections
- 16 June 1991 Sicilian regional election
- 6 June and 21 November 1993 Italian regional elections
- 12–26 June 1994 Sardinian regional election
- 23 April 1995 Italian regional elections
- 16 June 1996 Sicilian regional election
- 31 May and 14 June and 22 November 1998 Italian regional elections
- 13–27 June 1999 Sardinian regional election
- 16 April 2000 Italian regional elections
- 24 June and 11 November 2001 Italian regional elections
- 8 June and 28 October 2003 Italian regional elections
- 12–13 June 2004 Sardinian regional election
- 3–4 April 2005 Italian regional elections
- 28 May and 5–6 November 2006 Italian regional elections
- 13–14 April and 25 May and 26 October and 9 November and 14–15 December 2008 Italian regional elections
- 15–16 February 2009 Sardinian regional election
- 28–29 March 2010 Italian regional elections
- 16–17 October 2011 Molise regional election
- 28 October 2012 Sicilian regional election
- 24–25 February and 17–18 November and 21–22 April and 26 May and 27 October 2013 Italian regional elections
- 16 February and 25 May and 23 November 2014 Italian regional elections
- 31 May 2015 Italian regional elections
- 5 November 2017 Sicilian regional election
- 4 March and 22 April and 29 April and 20 May and 21 October 2018 Italian regional elections
- 10 February and 24 February and 24 March and 26 May and 27 October 2019 Italian regional elections
- 26 January and 20–21 September 2020 Italian regional elections
- 3–4 October 2021 Italian regional elections
- 25 September 2022 Sicilian regional election
- 12–13 February and 2–3 April and 25–26 June and 22 October 2023 Italian regional elections

== Referendums ==
=== Overview ===
The constitution of Italy provides for two kinds of binding referendums.

A legislative referendum can be called in order to abrogate a law totally or partially, if requested by 500,000 electors or five regional councils. This kind of referendum is valid only if at least a majority of electors goes to the polling station. It is forbidden to call a referendum regarding financial laws or laws relating to pardons or the ratification of international treaties.

A constitutional referendum can be called in order to approve a constitutional law or amendment only when it has been approved by the Houses (Chamber of Deputies and Senate of the Republic) with a majority of less than two thirds in both or either House, and only at the request of one fifth of the members of either House, or 500,000 electors or five Regional Councils. A constitutional referendum is valid no matter how many electors go to the polling station. Any citizen entitled to vote in an election may participate in a referendum.

=== List of referendums ===
- 2 June 1946 Italian institutional referendum
- 12 May 1974 Italian divorce referendum
- 11 June 1978 Italian referendums
- 17–18 May 1981 Italian referendums
- 9 June 1985 Italian wage referendum
- 8 November 1987 Italian referendums
- 18 June 1989 Italian advisory referendum
- 3 June 1990 Italian referendums
- 9 June 1991 Italian electoral law referendum
- 18 April 1993 Italian referendum
- 11 June 1995 Italian referendum
- 15 June 1997 Italian referendum
- 18 April 1999 Italian referendum
- 21 May 2000 Italian referendum
- 7 October 2001 Italian constitutional referendum
- 15 May 2003 Italian referendum
- 12 June 2005 Italian fertility laws referendum
- 26 June 2006 Italian constitutional referendum
- 21–22 June 2009 Italian electoral law referendum
- 12–13 June 2011 Italian referendums
- 17 April 2016 Italian oil drilling referendum
- 4 December 2016 Italian constitutional referendum
- 20–21 September 2020 Italian constitutional referendum
- 12 June 2022 Italian referendum
- 8-9 June 2025 Italian referendum
- 22-23 March 2026 Italian constitutional referendum

== See also ==
- Electoral calendar
- Italian electoral law of 2017 for the Parliament of Italy
- Primary elections in Italy
