= South Tyrolean reintegration movement =

Secessionist movement in Italy

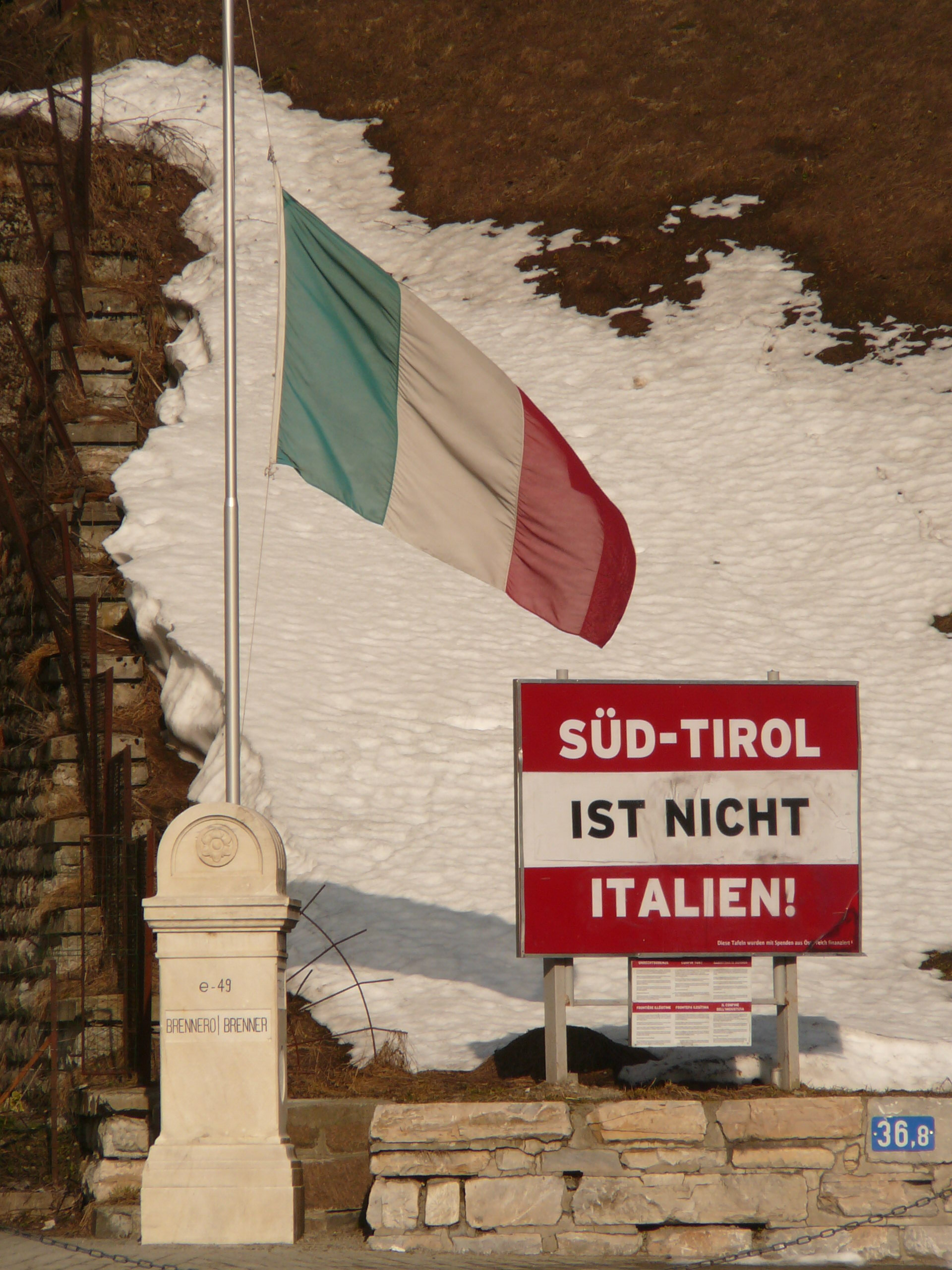
Poster saying "South Tyrol is not Italy!" on the background of an Austrian flag. The poster is located on the Austrian side of the border, not in South Tyrol.

The South Tyrolean reintegration movement (German: Südtiroler Unabhängigkeitsbewegung, Italian: Movimento d'Indipendenza dell'Alto Adige) is a political movement in the Italian autonomous province of South Tyrol that calls for the secession of the region from Italy and its reunification with the State of Tyrol, Austria. Concurrently, some groups favor the establishment of an interim Free State of South Tyrol as a sovereign nation while reintegration is organized.

== History ==
Flag of South Tyrol

The entirety of contemporary South Tyrol was the core of the County of Tyrol of the Holy Roman Empire. After the death of Meinhard, the only son of Margaret, Countess of Tyrol, in 1363 it became united with the hereditary land of the Habsburg dynasty, and was Austrian Crown Land for centuries except for a period during the Napoleonic Wars. After this it came under the jurisdiction of the Austrian Empire again in 1814. The popularity of nationalism cast a prominent shadow over Europe following the Napoleonic Wars. The Tyrolean Rebellion occurred during Bavarian rule. In the Kingdom of Italy, the fervor of Italian irredentism was born in 1866. Irredentism entailed the unification of all territories on the Italian Peninsula or those perceived to be Italian into a single nation. South Tyrol, given its geographic location south of the Alps, and despite having a majority German-speaking, Austrian-oriented population, was often the subject of Italian calls for absorption into Italy.

At the onset of the First World War, Italy remained strictly neutral. It was only on April 26, 1915 that Italy declared war on the Central Powers. This change in attitude is attributed by historians to the secretive signing of the Treaty of London, which entailed that in exchange for Italy's support the country "shall obtain the Trentino, Cisalpine Tyrol with its geographical and natural frontier (the Brenner frontier)" from the German-aligned Austro-Hungarian Empire. Despite petitions from public officials in South Tyrol and reassurances from United States President Woodrow Wilson that the "readjustment of the frontiers of Italy should be effected along clearly recognizable lines of nationality," southern Tyrol and Trentino fell under Italian military administration with the signing of the Treaty of Saint-Germain-en-Laye in September 1919.

=== German-Italian tensions ===
The rise to power of Benito Mussolini and Fascism in Italy in 1922 produced a strong desire for cultural assimilation via a policy of Italianization, which sought the elimination of the German language in speech and education, as well as everyday use, such as dual language notices on road signs and in advertisements. At the onset of World War II, Italy and Nazi Germany converged to form the Axis powers. Under the South Tyrol Option Agreement, the two countries agreed to compel South Tyrolese (or South Tyroleans) who resisted Italianization to immigrate into the Greater Germanic Reich. 86% of South Tyrolese complied with resettlement in territories controlled (or occupied) by Germany. While most of the immigrants returned after the war, these policies resulted in the permanent departure of 75,000 of the populace. Linguistic reforms were instituted following the Fascist regime's overthrow in 1945, restoring most of the basic rights of South Tyrolese that had been previously revoked.

=== Autonomy status ===
South Tyrol was granted the status of an autonomous area by an agreement between the Government of Italy and local officials in 1972. This entailed a much greater level of self-government in the province; the extent of which was a topic of heated debate until a final agreement between the governments of Austria and Italy in 1992. South Tyrol's designation as a self-governing province grants it an abundance of privileges; for example, only 10% of the taxes paid in South Tyrol go to the Italian central government.

== Secessionist movement ==
=== Bombing campaigns ===
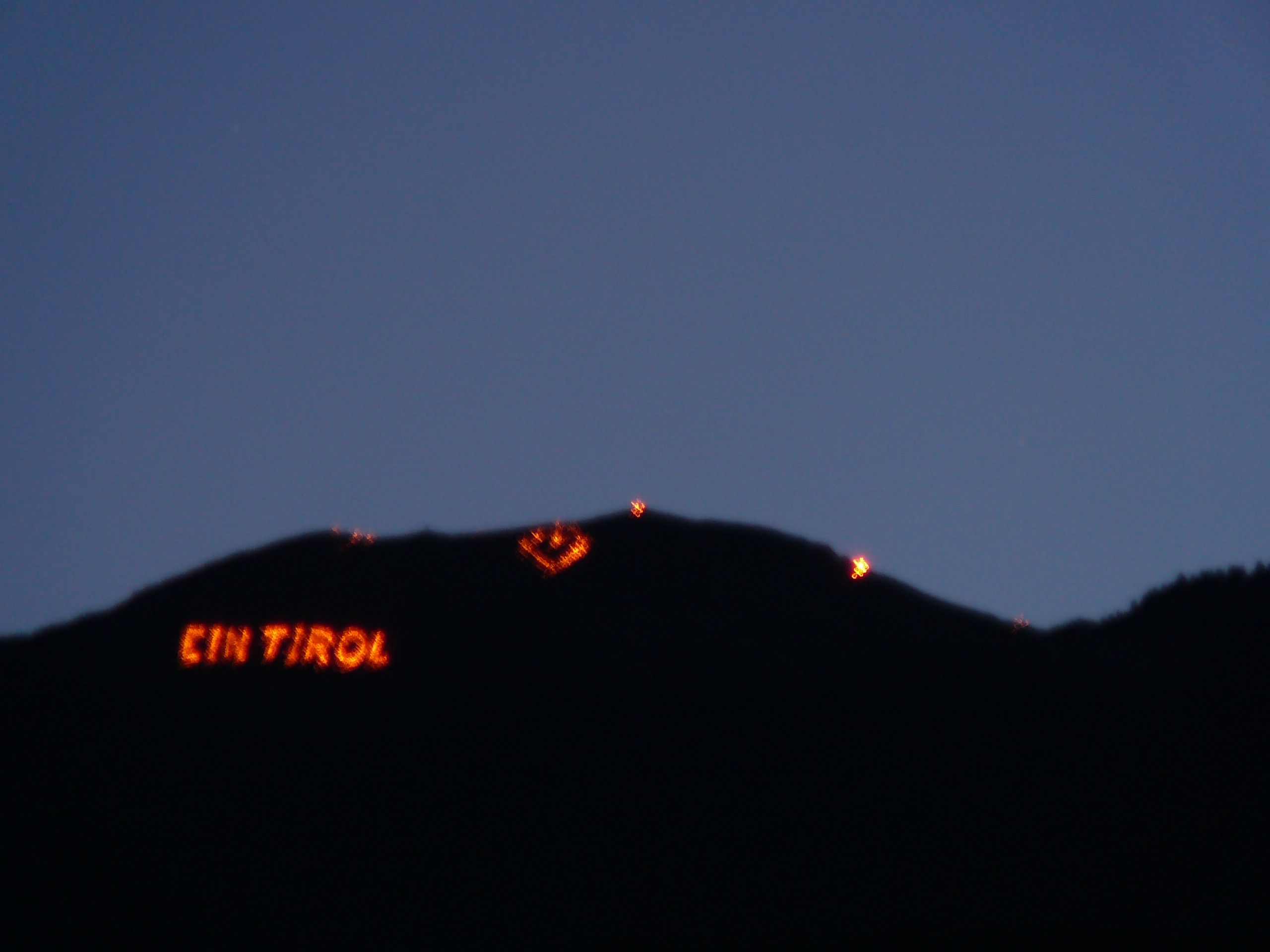
Ein Tirol ("One Tyrol") demonstration in 2009.

The earliest post-war activism for South Tyrol's removal from Italy can be found in the South Tyrolean Liberation Committee, which conducted bombings of Italian infrastructure and fascist monuments primarily between the mid-1950s and 1961. The most notable of these incidents was the Night of Fire on June 12, 1961, in which a large electrical supply unit was destroyed via explosives. The incident was followed by a series of bombings and ambushes on carabinieri and other security forces, with the 1967 attack on a patrol at Cima Vallona being the most notorious.

Years after the Liberation Committee ceased activity came the Ein Tirol, a far right terrorist organization which followed in the footsteps of its predecessor by executing the explosive damage of various relics of Italian fascism as well as historic memorials. Since the mid-1980s the extremist group has taken on a far less prominent and violent role in the independence movement; in 2009 a mountainside overlooking celebrations of the Sacred Heart of Jesus feast was burned to spell out the name of the group.

=== Political solutions ===
Some political parties advocating South Tyrol's secession have risen to minor prominence on both the local and national levels, among them the South Tyrolean Freedom, Die Freiheitlichen and Citizens' Union for South Tyrol. These parties nicknamed the "Patriotic camp" encompass 4 of the 35 seats of the South Tylorean Provincial Council, with the autonomist South Tylorean People's Party consistently coming on top of the coalition above in elections. The movements specific to South Tyrol do not maintain a relationship with the Lega Nord, whose agenda is sometimes dedicated to the establishment of an independent state of Padania in Northern Italy.

=== Popularity ===
In 2013, one poll held by the Austrian research institute Karmasin claimed that 54% of German or Ladin-speaking South Tyroleans would support secession from Italy, while 46% of the total population (including Italians) would encourage South Tyrol's secession.

Year	Party	Votes	Percentage	Seats
1964	Tyrolean Homeland Party	5,258	2.4%	1
1973	Party of Independents	2,615	1.2%	0
1978	Party of Independents	3,539	1.3%	1
1983	South Tyrolean Homeland Federation	7,285	2.6%	1
1983	Party of Independents	6,960	2.4%	1
1983	TOTAL:	14,245	5.0%	2
1988	South Tyrolean Homeland Federation	7,003	2.3%	1
1988	Party of Independents	4,133	1.4%	1
1988	TOTAL:	11,136	3.7%	2
1993	Die Freiheitlichen	18,669	6.1%	2
1993	Union for South Tyrol	14,777	4.8%	2
1993	TOTAL:	33,446	10.9%	4
1998	Union for South Tyrol	16,591	5.5%	2
1998	Die Freiheitlichen	7,543	2.5%	1
1998	TOTAL:	24,134	8.0%	3
2003	Union for South Tyrol	20,554	6.8%	2
2003	Die Freiheitlichen	15,121	5.0%	2
2003	TOTAL:	35,675	11.8%	4
2008	Die Freiheitlichen	43,614	14.3%	5
2008	South Tyrolean Freedom	14,888	4.9%	2
2008	Union for South Tyrol	7,048	2.3%	1
2008	TOTAL:	65,550	21.5%	8
2013	Die Freiheitlichen	51,504	17.9%	6
2013	South Tyrolean Freedom	20,736	7.2%	3
2013	Citizens' Union for South Tyrol–We South Tyroleans–Ladins	6,065	2.1%	1
2013	TOTAL:	78,305	27.3%	10
2018	Die Freiheitlichen	17,620	6.2%	2
2018	South Tyrolean Freedom	16,927	6.0%	2
2018	Citizens' Union for South Tyrol	3,664	1.3%	0
2018	TOTAL:	38,211	13.4%	4
2023	South Tyrolean Freedom	30,583	10.9%	4
2023	Jürgen Wirth Anderlan List	16,596	5.9%	2
2023	Die Freiheitlichen	13,836	4.9%	2
2023	TOTAL:	61,015	21.7%	8

== Reasons for secession ==
=== Ethnolingual diversity ===
Listed below are percentages, obtained via census, of South Tyrol's population, based on their first language:

Language distribution in 2024

Year	German	Italian	Ladin	Others	Country
1880	90.6	3.4	4.3	1.7	Austria-Hungary
1890	89.0	4.5	4.3	2.3	Austria-Hungary
1900	88.8	4.0	4.0	3.2	Austria-Hungary
1910	89.0	2.9	3.8	4.3	Austria-Hungary
1921	75.9	10.6	3.9	9.6	Italy
1961	62.2	34.3	3.4	0.1	Italy
1971	62.9	33.3	3.7	0.1	Italy
1981	64.9	28.7	4.1	2.2	Italy
1991	65.3	26.5	4.2	4.0	Italy
2001	64.0	24.5	4.0	7.4	Italy
2011	61.5	23.1	4.0	11.4	Italy
2024	57.6	22.6	3.7	16.1	Italy

Tensions over the fair treatment and acknowledgement of minority-language speakers have been a historical justification for separatism, although their protection is cemented by a law passed in November 1991.

=== Economic situation ===
South Tyrol is among the wealthiest provinces of Italy with a GDP per capita of €32,000. This being said, Italy is a country which has suffered unrelenting decline since the birth of the Eurozone crisis in 2009. In 2012 the region was projected to allocate €120 millio towards stabilizing the national budget of Italy. To accomplish this, the region was forced to heighten taxes and fees on crop production, a move which pundits say violates South Tyrol's status as an autonomous region. Eva Klotz, founder and representative of South Tyrolean Freedom in the local parliament, has reflected much of current German-speaking South Tyrolean sentiment in stating that the region "shouldn't be dragged down" with the rest of Italy.

== Relations with Austria ==
The treatment and absorption of South Tyrol have often been a source of strain in the foreign relations between Italy and Austria. In the immediate aftermath of World War II, the transitional Austrian government expressed concern for the treatment of Austrian and Ladin ethnic minorities in South Tyrol. This was settled via the signing of Paris Treaty by the two parties on September 5, 1946, outlining a platform for South Tyrol's autonomy and the protection of minorities. However, the changes dictated by the treaty went largely unimplemented, resulting in an Austrian appeal on the situation to the United Nations in 1961. Austria disputed Italy's sovereignty over South Tyrol until the issuing of the aforementioned autonomy package in 1992; in the mid-1990s the Austrian government asked their Italian counterparts to offer amnesty to jailed independence activists, the majority of whom had been engaged in the bombing campaign during the 1950s and 60s.

The Freedom Party of Austria has encouraged the distribution of Austrian citizenship to South Tyroleans, although the Austrian government has repeatedly turned down this request. In 2019, 247 Austrians settled in South Tyrol, while 942 South Tyroleans immigrated to Austria.

== See also ==
- List of active separatist movements in Europe
- South Tyrol
- Trentino
