= Social Progressive Party of South Tyrol =

Former party from South Tyrol

Social Democratic Party of South Tyrol Sozialdemokratische Partei Südtirols
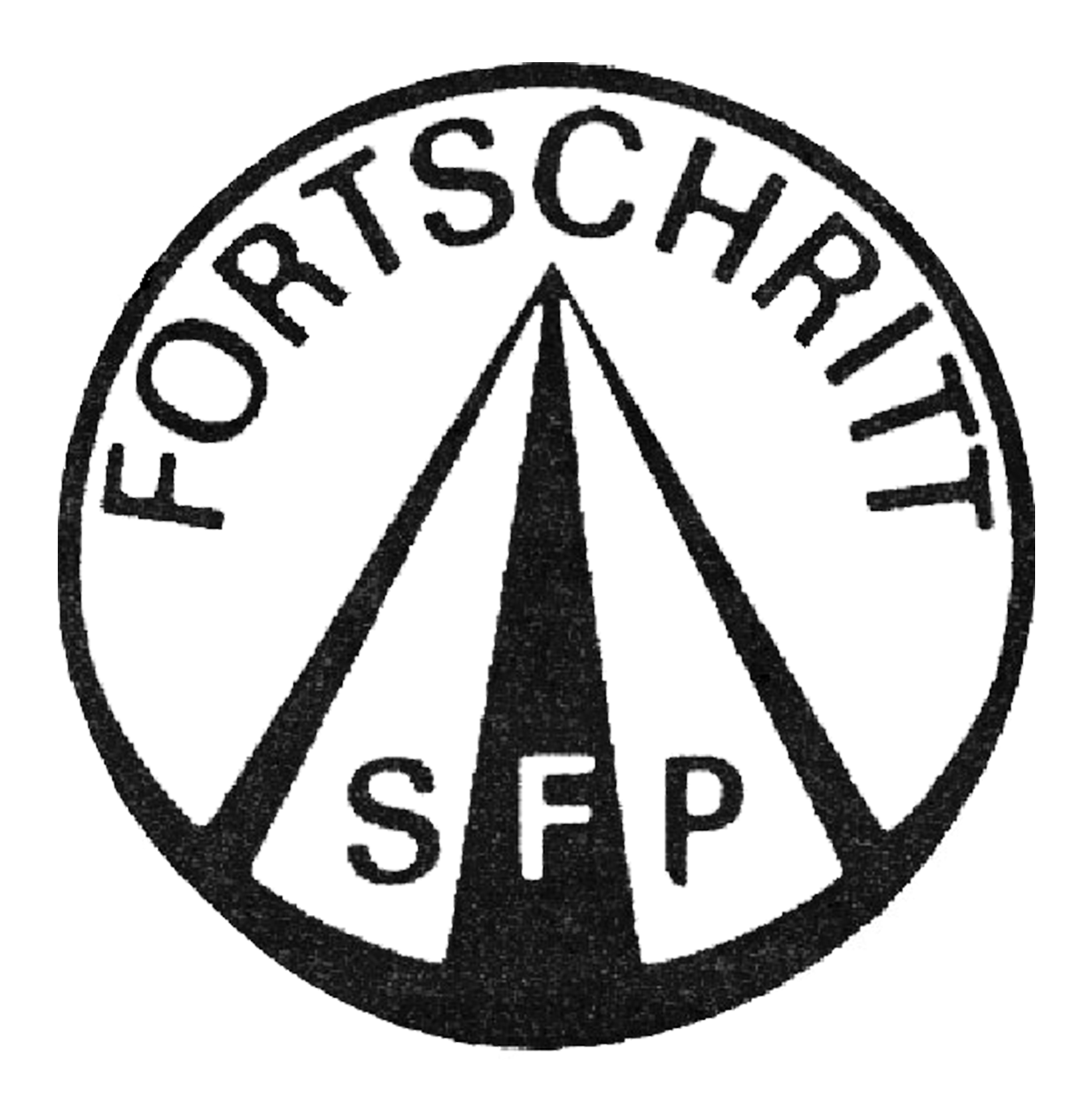
- Leader: Egmont Jenny
- Founded: 1966
- Dissolved: 1978
- Split from: South Tyrolean People's Party
- Merged into: Social Democratic Party of South Tyrol
- Ideology: South Tyrolean regionalism Social democracy
- Political position: Centre-left

The Social Progressive Party of South Tyrol (German: Soziale Fortschrittspartei Südtirols, SFP) was a regionalist social-democratic party of German speakers South Tyrol that was active from 1966 to 1978.

It was launched in 1966 by Egmont Jenny, former leader of the left wing of the South Tyrolean People's Party (SVP), and thanks to the support of the Socialist Party of Austria and its leader Bruno Kreisky. Its best electoral result was in 1968 when it won 2.4% of the vote, although not winning any seat in the Landtag of South Tyrol, while in 1973 it took 1.7% and got Jenny elected to the Provincial Council. The party, after having failed to merge with the Social Democratic Party of South Tyrol (5.1% in 1973) and even tried to form an alliance with the right-wing Party of Independents, was disbanded in the late 1970s, with Jenny leaving the Landtag in 1978.

== Electoral results ==
=== Provincial Council ===
Landtag of South Tyrol
Election year	# of overall votes	% of overall vote	# of overall seats won	+/–
1968	5,332	2.6	0 / 25	Steady
1973	4,012	1.7	1 / 34	▲1
1978	2,047	0.8	0 / 34	▼1

== Literature ==
- Joachim Gatterer, "rote milben im gefieder". Sozialdemokratische, kommunistische und grün-alternative Parteipolitik in Südtirol, Studienverlag, Innsbruck-Vienna-Bozen, 2009. ISBN 978-3-7065-4648-5
