= South Tyrolean Homeland Federation =

South Tyrolean Homeland Federation Südtiroler Heimatbund
- Leader: Roland Lang
- Founded: 9 February 1974
- Merged into: Union for South Tyrol
- Ideology: Regionalism; German minority interests

Website
- http://www.suedtiroler-freiheitskampf.net/

The South Tyrolean Homeland Federation (German: Südtiroler Heimatbund, SHB) is a political organisation active in South Tyrol.

The party was established in 1974. It won 4.2% in the 1983 general election, when it ran as Election Association of Homeland Federation (Wahlverband des Heimatbundes), and 2.6% in the 1983 provincial election, enough for granting Eva Klotz a seat in the Provincial Council. In 1988 the party obtained 2.3% and Klotz was re-elected to the council. In 1989 a majority of the party merged with the Freedom Party of South Tyrol of Gerold Meraner (1.4% in 1988) and conservative splinters from the South Tyrolean People's Party led by Alfons Benedikter to form Union for South Tyrol.

Hans Stieler was the party's chairman from 1974 to 1990. He was succeeded by Sepp Mitterhofer (1990–2011) and Roland Lang (since 2011). The SHB has a federal committee, a federal management and a district representative in each district of South Tyrol. In 2007 the SHB was instrumental in the foundation of South Tyrolean Freedom (STF), was founding leader was Klotz. The SHB also seeks cooperation with all the parties, groups and associations in South Tyrol and Austria adopting legal means to promote the self-determination of South Tyrol, while also participating in the non-partisan Working Group for Self-determination (Arbeitsgruppe für Selbstbestimmung, ASG).
