= Freedom Party of South Tyrol =

Freedom Party of South Tyrol Freiheitliche Partei Südtirols
- Leader: Gerold Meraner
- Founded: 1987
- Dissolved: c.1989
- Merger of: Party of Independents
- Merged into: Union for South Tyrol
- Ideology: South Tyrol regionalism National liberalism
- Political position: Centre-right to Right-wing

The Freedom Party of South Tyrol (German: Freiheitliche Partei Südtirols, FPS) was a regionalist national-liberal political party in South Tyrol.

== History ==
It was launched in 1988 as the continuation of the Party of Independents by Gerold Meraner. In the 1988 provincial election FPS took 1.4% and got Meraner elected to the Provincial Council. The party was soon merged with the South Tyrolean Homeland Federation of Eva Klotz and conservative splinters from the South Tyrolean People's Party led by Alfons Benedikter to form the Union for South Tyrol.

In December 1992 a group of dissidents from the South Tyrolean People's Party led by Christian Waldner founded Die Freiheitlichen. They were joined by some former members of the FPS around Martin Wenter who left the Union for South Tyrol after internal conflicts in 1993. Gerold Meraner later identified Die Freiheitlichen as the legitimate heir of the FPS.
