= Citizens' Union for South Tyrol =

Italian political parity

Citizens' Union for South Tyrol BürgerUnion für Südtirol
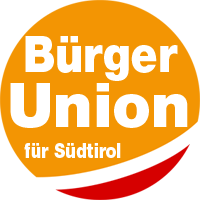
- President: Andreas Pöder
- Founded: 2 October 1989
- Dissolved: 2020
- Merger of: South Tyrolean Homeland Federation; Freedom Party of South Tyrol
- Headquarters: via Garibaldi, 6; 39100 Bolzano
- Newspaper: Zukunft Heimat
- Ideology: Regionalism; German-speaking minority interests National conservatism Right-wing populism Separatism
- Political position: Right-wing

Website
- www.buergerunion.st

The Citizens' Union for South Tyrol (German: BürgerUnion für Südtirol, BUfS), formerly Union for South Tyrol (Union für Südtirol, UfS), was a national-conservative and, at times, right-wing populist political party active in South Tyrol, Italy.

The party was committed to the German-speaking minority and its right to self-determination. Recently, the party re-branded itself as a centrist party and distanced from the separatism of other German-speaking parties.

Its long-time leader was Andreas Pöder.

== History ==
The Union for South Tyrol was founded on 2 October 1989 by the merger of the nationalist South Tyrolean Homeland Federation of Eva Klotz (2.3% in the 1988 provincial election), the national-liberal Freedom Party of South Tyrol led by Gerold Meraner and right-wing splinters from the South Tyrolean People's Party led by Alfons Benedikter.

In the 1993 provincial election the party won 4.8% of the vote and gained two seats in the Provincial Council, one for Klotz and one for Benedikter. In the 1996 general election the party had its best result ever (7.7% for party list and 19.2% in single-seat constituencies), because the South Tyrolean People's Party had formed an alliance with some Italian parties.

In the 1998 provincial election the UfS won 5.5% and Andreas Pöder, party secretary since 1994, was elected for the first time to the Council, along with Klotz. This was a turning point for the party as Pöder started to gain influence over Klotz.

In the 2003 provincial election, the UfS won 6.8% of the vote and gained two seats in the Provincial Council.

In May 2007, during a heated party congress, Pöder was re-elected party president with 76 votes in favour and 70 against. This led to a split led by Kloz, who launched a new strictly separatist movement named South Tyrolean Freedom (STF).

In the 2008 general election, severely damaged by the split and by the competition of Die Freiheitlichen (9.4%), the UfS gained only 4.2% of the vote in the Province. In the 2008 provincial election the party got only 2.3% of the vote and one elect in the Provincial Council, while STF and Die Freiheitlichen won the 14.3% and the 4.9% of the vote, respectively.

The UfS renamed itself to Citizens' Union for South Tyrol (BUfS) on 12 May 2011.

In the forthcoming 2013 provincial election the BUfS will run as part of a three-party list, along with Ladins Dolomites, a centre-left outfit, and We South Tyroleans, a left-wing split from Die Freiheitlichen. The joint list won 2.1% of the vote and Pöder was re-elected to the Provincial Council.

In the 2018 general election was League supported by BUfS. In the 2018 provincial election the party won barely 1.3% and no seats. Thus, Pöder was not elected to the Provincial Council, after 20 consecutive years of elective service.

The BUfS was rarely active after 2018. It did not field any lists in the 2020 municipal elections: three municipal councillors were candidates for the Die Freiheitlichen, while another one ran with STF. Pöder retired from politics and the party was dissolved by 2020.

== Ideology ==
Since the exit of Eva Klotz, the UfS tried to renew its image and to present itself as a centrist-conservative party. The 2008 party programme included defense of family values, protection of the environment, and a moderately liberal economic policy, along with the historic goal of separating South Tyrol from Italy in order to re-unify it with old historic Tyrol composed from South, North and East Tyrol, founding the Europaregion Tirol (North-and East-Tyrol are actually parts of Austria).

More recently, the party re-branded itself as a centrist, to some extent centre-left, party and distanced from its original separatism and the parties of the "German right". In 2011 Pöder said that, were he a German citizen, he would be a Social Democrat and in 2013 declared: "Don't call us German right, we are a centrist movement".

== Popular support ==
The electoral results of the UfS in the Province of Bolzano since 1992 are shown in the table below.

1992 general	1993 provinc.	1994 general	1994 European	1996 general	1998 provinc.	1999 European	2001 general	2003 provinc.	2004 European
3.7	4.8	-	4.6 (Note: In list with the Valdostan Union of Aosta Valley.)	7.7 (Note: This result refers to single-seat constituencies; the party list of the UfS won 19.2% for proportional representation, because the South Tyrolean People's Party had formed an alliance with some Italian parties.)	5.5	6.4 (Note: In list with the Liga Veneta Repubblica of Veneto.)	-	6.8	6.3 (Note: In list with the Lega per l'Autonomia – Alleanza Lombarda of Lombardy and the Liga Veneta Repubblica of Veneto.)

2006 general	2008 general	2008 provinc.	2009 European	2013 general	2013 provinc.	2014 European	2018 general	2018 provinc.
-	4.2	2.3	-	-	2.1 (Note: In list with We South Tyroleans and Ladins Dolomites.)	-	-	1.3

== Leadership ==
- President/Secretary: (Note: The president (Obmann) was replaced by the figure of the secretary (Landessekretär) from 1994 to 2007, when the title Obmann was reintroduced. Thus, Pöder served as secretary from 1994 to 2007, then as president since 2007.) Alfons Benedikter (1989–1991), Martin Wenter (1991–1993), Karl Augusten (1993–1994), Andreas Pöder (1994–2020)
