= 1978 Italian regional elections =

Regional elections were held in some regions of Italy during 1978. These included:

- Aosta Valley on 25 June
- Friuli-Venezia Giulia on 25 June
- Trentino-Alto Adige on 19 November
