= 1968 Italian regional elections =

Regional elections were held in some regions of Italy during 1968. These included:

- Aosta Valley on 21 April
- Friuli-Venezia Giulia on 26 May
- Trentino-Alto Adige on 17 November
