= Luigi Carbonari =

Italian politician (1880–1971)

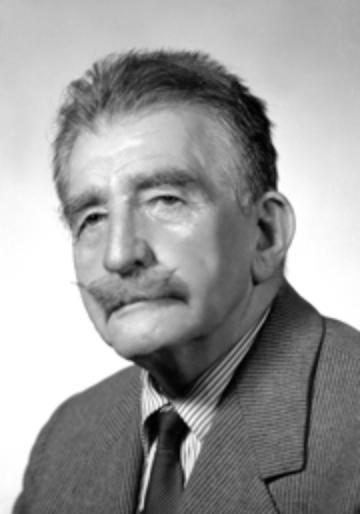

Member of the Italian Chamber of Deputies
- In office 11 June 1921 – 25 January 1924
- In office 24 May 1924 – 9 November 1926

Member of the National Council
- In office 25 September 1945 – 24 June 1946

Member of the Constituent Assembly
- In office 16 July 1946 – 31 January 1948

Member of the Senate of the Republic
- In office 8 May 1948 – 24 June 1953

Personal details
- Born: 3 October 1880; Folgaria, Trentino, County of Tyrol, Austria-Hungary
- Died: 13 October 1971 (aged 91)
- Political party: Italian People's Party (1912/1919–1926); Christian Democracy (1945–1960)

Luigi Carbonari (1880–1971) was an Italian politician from Trentino who was active in the agricultural cooperative movement.

== Biography ==
Born in the village of Carbonare, Folgaria, in 1880, at the time part of the County of Tyrol, an estate of Austria-Hungary, Carbonari completed studies in law and political science, graduating from the Universities of Vienna in 1907 and Heidelberg in 1908.

During his studies he was active in the movements for Italian language rights and autonomy for Trentino. In 1906, along with Alcide De Gasperi, he was imprisoned for taking part in demonstrations demanding the Italian University of Trieste and in 1907 he was arrested for calling for the Italian annexation of Trentino.

Carbonari was elected to Senate in 1948 serving one term until 1953. He served on the 8th Standing Commission on Agriculture and Food.

== Craftsman-Farmer Alliance ==
The Craftsman-Farmer Alliance (Italian: Alleanza Contadina Artigiana, abbreviated A.C.A.) was a political party founded by Luigi Carbonari. The party contested the 1964 Trentino-Alto Adige regional election. It won 6,307 votes (2.63% in Trentino, 1.37% of the votes in the entire Trentino-Alto Adige/Südtirol), and one seat in the regional assembly from Trento (held by Carbonari). However, in the 1968 Trentino-Alto Adige regional election the party got 2,275 votes (0.92% of the votes in Trento, 0.48% in the entire region) and no seats.
