= South Tyrolean Freedom =

Political party in Italy

South Tyrolean Freedom Süd-Tiroler Freiheit
- Leader in Landtag: Sven Knoll
- Spokesperson / Legal Representative: Werner Thaler
- Founder: Eva Klotz
- Founded: May 2007; 19 years ago
- Split from: Union for South Tyrol
- Headquarters: St. Josef am See, 74; 39052 Kaltern an der Weinstraße
- Membership (2025): 6,370
- Ideology: Regionalism; Separatism; National conservatism; Right-wing populism; German-speaking minority interests
- Political position: Right-wing
- European affiliation: European Free Alliance (2009–2024)
- Chamber of Deputies: 0 / 400
- Senate: 0 / 200
- European Parliament: 0 / 76
- Provincial Council: 4 / 35

Party flag

Website
- www.suedtiroler-freiheit.com

South Tyrolean Freedom (German: Süd-Tiroler Freiheit, STF) is a regionalist, separatist and national-conservative political party in South Tyrol, Italy. The party, which is part of the South Tyrolean independence movement, seeks to represent the German-speaking population and proposes the secession of South Tyrol from Italy and its reunification with the State of Tyrol within Austria.

The party, whose founding leader was Eva Klotz, is officially led by Werner Thaler, but its leading figure is Sven Knoll.

== History ==
The South Tyrolean Freedom emerged as a split from the Union for South Tyrol (UfS) in May 2007. On 8 June 2007 it was notarially founded in Brixen. The founding members were Herbert Campidell, Eva Klotz, Sven Knoll, Reinhold Ladurner, Roland Lang, Sepp Mitterhofer, Werner Thaler and Dietmar Zwerger.

In mid-2007, the party presented a provocative poster campaign with the slogan Süd-Tirol ist nicht Italien! ("South Tyrol is not Italy") and the Austrian flag as background. A sign with the same content was also set up at the Brenner Pass border between Italy and Austria, in June 2008.

In April 2009, the STF became a full member of the European Free Alliance, a pan-European organization of regionalist parties. Gudrun Kofler from the STF Youth (Junge Süd-Tiroler Freiheit) was elected as Vice President of the EFA Youth.

In January 2012, it was reported that the party had reached 2,800 members, a lot more than UfS in its best days.

In the 2013 provincial election, the STF won 7.2% of the vote, its record high so far, resulting in three provincial councillors.

In November 2014, Klotz, who had served in the Provincial Council for 31 consecutive years (for SH, UfS and STF), announced her resignation from the assembly in order to take care of her husband, who was severely ill.

In the 2018 provincial election, the party obtained 6.0% of the vote and two provincial councillors.

In the municipal elections in September 2020, South Tyrolean Freedom competed in 29 South Tyrolean municipalities with 140 candidates. It was able to increase its seats from 41 to 49.

In the 2023 provincial election, the party surged to 10.9% of the vote, translating into four provincial councillors.

== Ideology ==
The STF sees itself as a "liberal-patriotic" party aimed at protecting the German-speaking population of South Tyrol. The party claims South Tyroleans' right to self-determination and to conduct a referendum in order to decide whether they want to be part of Italy or the Austrian state of Tyrol. The party programme also emphasizes the protection of the environment, the defense of family values, a moderately liberal economic policy and the concept of Europe of the regions.

== Election results ==
=== Landtag of South Tyrol ===
Landtag of South Tyrol
Election	Leader	Votes	%	Seats	+/−
2008	Eva Klotz	14,888	4.9	2 / 35	New
2013	Eva Klotz	20,736	7.2	3 / 35	▲1
2018	Sven Knoll	16,927	6.0	2 / 35	▼1
2023	Sven Knoll	30,583	10.9	4 / 35	▲2

== Leadership ==
- Spokesperson / Legal Representative: Werner Thaler (2007–present)

== Bibliography ==
- Medda-Windischer, Roberta; Carlà, Andrea, eds. (2015). Migration and Autonomous Territories: The Case of South Tyrol and Catalonia. Brill Publishers. ISBN 978-90-04-28278-0.
