= 1993 Italian regional elections =

Regional elections were held in some regions of Italy during 1993. These included:

- Aosta Valley on 6 June
- Friuli-Venezia Giulia on 6 June
- Trentino-Alto Adige on 21 November

These were the last elections before a September 1993 electoral reform law forced the national parties into forming coalitions.

== See also ==
- 1988 Italian regional elections
