= New Left (Trentino-Alto Adige/Südtirol) =

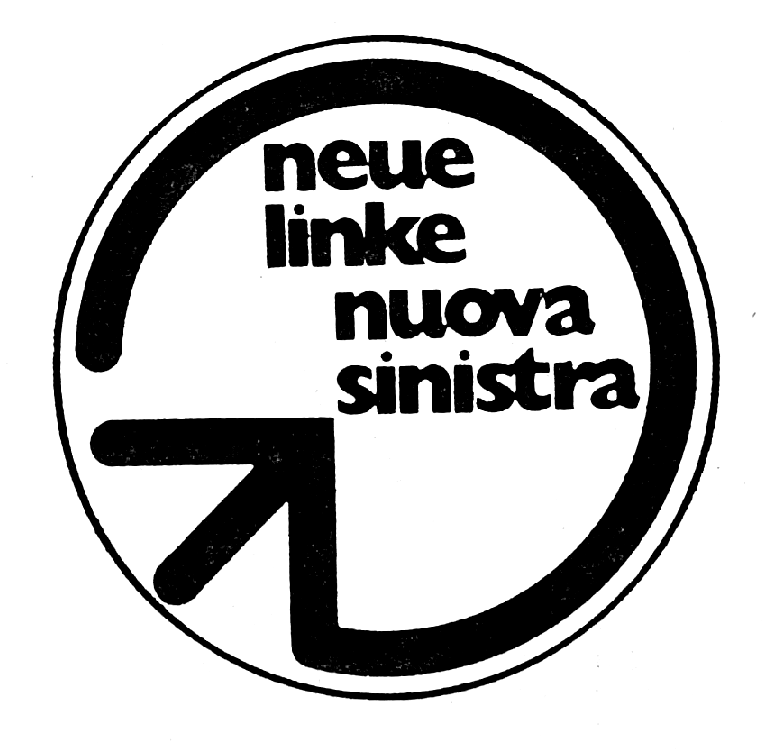
Logo of the list

The New Left (German: Neue Linke, Italian: Nuova Sinistra, NL-NS) was a list which contested the 1978 Trentino-Alto Adige/Südtirol regional election. The list was led by Alexander Langer, a former member of Lotta Continua. NL-NS opposed the dominant ethnic division in South Tyrolean politics. NL-NS won 12,315 votes (4.38%) in Trentino and 9,753 votes (3.65%) in South Tyrol. In total, NL-NS obtained 4.03% of the votes cast in the election. The list won two seats, one from Trento (Alessandro Canestrini) and one from South Tyrol (Alexander Langer).

In the 1983 Trentino-Alto Adige/Südtirol regional election, Langer contested on the Alternative List for another South Tyrol.
