= 1973 Italian regional elections =

Regional elections were held in some regions of Italy during 1973. These included:

- Aosta Valley on 10 June
- Friuli-Venezia Giulia on 17 June
- Trentino-Alto Adige on 18 November
