= Alexander Langer =

Italian journalist, peace activist, politician, translator, and teacher

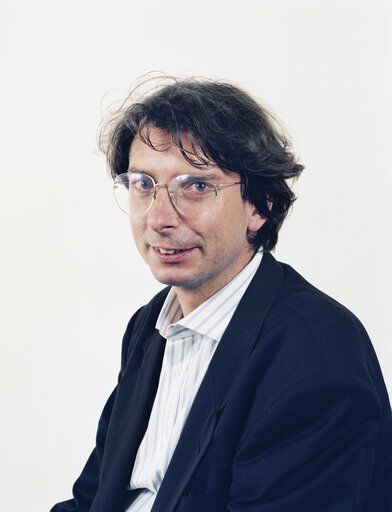
- Born: 22 February 1946; Sterzing, South Tyrol, Italy
- Died: 3 July 1995 (aged 49) (suicide); Florence, Italy
- Occupations: Journalist, peace activist, politician, translator, and teacher

Alexander Langer (22 February 1946 – 3 July 1995) was an Italian journalist, peace activist, politician, translator, and teacher. After taking part in the Protests of 1968 and garnering regional attention during the 1970s as a peace and environmental activist, in 1978 he became the first New Left candidate to be elected in South Tyrol. During the 1980s, Langer became a national figure as a member of the Federation of the Greens, and was elected to the European Parliament from 1989 until his death in 1995.

== Biography ==
Born on 22 February 1946 in Sterzing, Alto Adige / South Tyrol, a province of Italy inhabited by a German-speaking population, he became involved early on in local political issues, which at the time centred on the interethnic relations in the region, which after two world wars and decades of tensions and terrorism were very tense.

In the early 1970s, he was active in Lotta Continua, a left-wing political organization in Italy. Later, he joined the Green Party of South Tyrol and became a member of the regional council for Trentino-Alto Adige/Südtirol in 1978. Ever resistant to imposed ethnic boundaries, he refused twice to declare his ethnic group during the 1981 and 1991 censuses in Bolzano. (This is a mandatory choice in the province, to protect the ethnic status quo. His refusal made him ineligible to stand for local elections.)

During the 1980s he rose in the ranks of the Green Party, first at the national level, and then in Europe, eventually becoming Member of the European Parliament and president of the Greens/EFA Group in the European Parliament in 1989.

He later became deeply involved in peace initiatives in Europe and the Middle East, and in fostering the dialogue between the alternative left parties, the Radicals, left-wing Christians and other pro-peace, environmentalist and fringe political groups at European level. He served as a representative of the European Parliament in Israel, Russia, Brazil, Argentina, Libya, Egypt, Cyprus, and Malta, and was particularly involved in campaigning for peace in the former Yugoslavia, during the ethnic wars of the 1990s.

On 26 June 1995, Langer took part in the protests in Cannes against Europe's inertia in the face of the war in the Balkans and on the same day he wrote his final article, also on Bosnia, entitled "Europe dies or is reborn in Sarajevo."

Shocked by the drama of the war, suffering from asthma and depression, on 3 July 1995, Langer committed suicide in Pian dei Giullari, near Florence, by hanging himself from an apricot tree. He left three notes to his family and friends, one of which was written in German to his friends, explaining the gesture and also quoting a sentence from the Gospel of Matthew.

== Alexander Langer Award ==
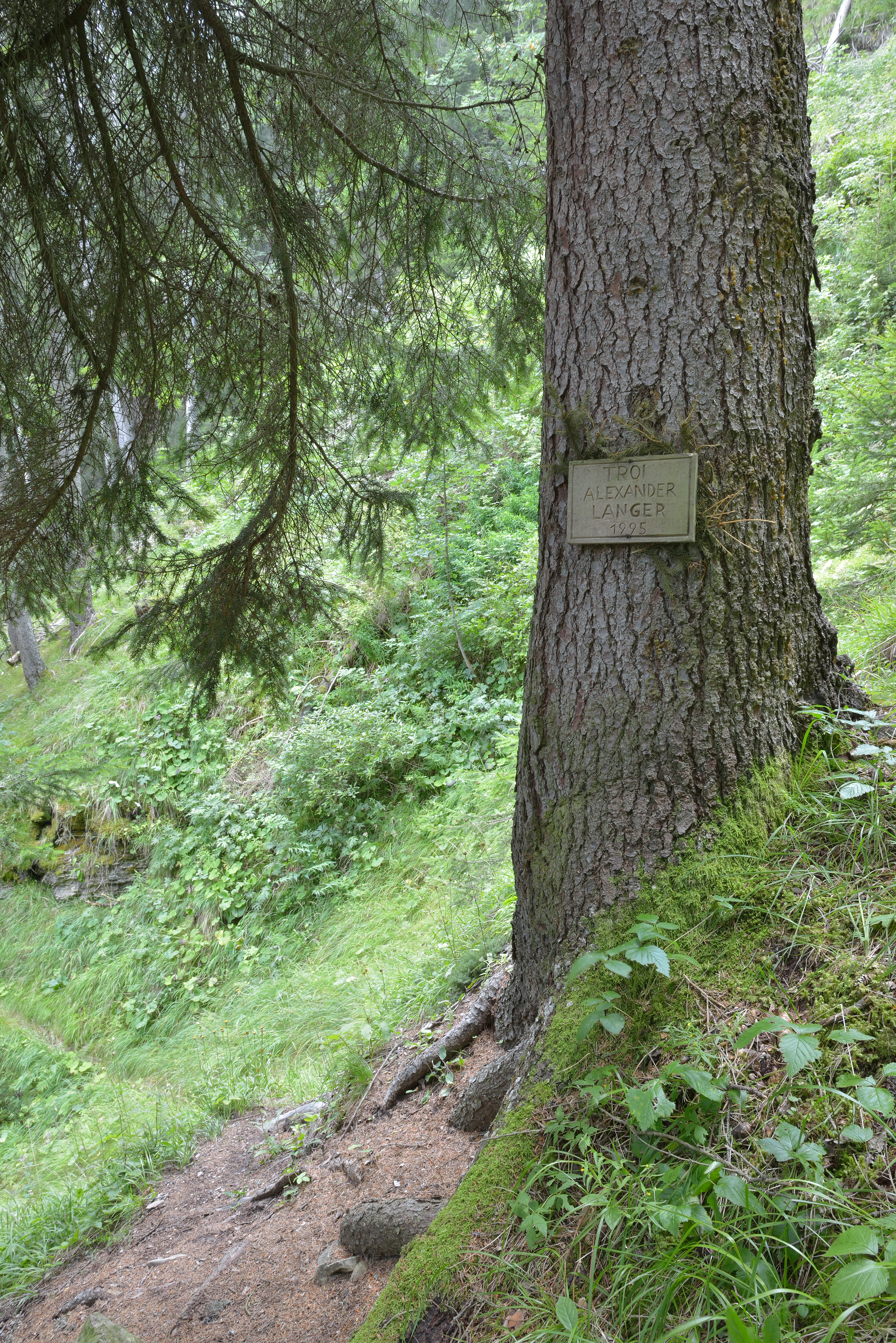
The "Alexander Langer" trail leading to the Waterfall (1565 mslm) Pisciadoi de Pedroc in Santa Cristina, Val Gardena, South Tyrol

Beginning in 1997, the Alexander Langer Foundation has given an annual award to an activist in Langer's honour. As of 2012, the award carries a 10,000-euro honorarium.

== See also ==
- List of peace activists
