= Liberal conservatism =

Political ideology within conservatism

Liberal conservatism is a political ideology combining conservative policies with liberal stances, generally on social and ethical matters, representing a brand of political conservatism strongly influenced by liberalism.

The ideology incorporates the classical liberal view of minimal government intervention in the economy, according to which individuals should be free to participate in the market and generate wealth without government interference. However, liberal conservatives also hold that individuals cannot be thoroughly depended on to act responsibly in other spheres of life; therefore, they believe that a strong state is necessary to ensure law and order and that social institutions are needed to nurture a sense of duty and responsibility to the nation. Liberal conservatives also support civil liberties, and they differ on social issues; some are socially conservative and others socially liberal, though all liberal conservatives broadly support the rule of law regarding civil rights, social equality and the environment. This is equated with the creation of a cohesive and tolerant society with increased levels of individual responsibility and less inequality.

Liberal conservatism shares the classical liberal tenets of a commitment to individualism, belief in negative freedom, a lightly regulated free market, and a minimal rule of law state. A number of commentators have stated that many conservative currents in the 1980s, such as Thatcherism, were rejuvenated classical liberals in all but name. However, in contrast to classical liberalism, there is a stronger social agenda and support for a greater degree of state intervention, especially in those areas of social life which liberal conservatives believe should not be subject to market forces. Particularly with regard to the family, sexuality, health and education, these should either always be periodically regulated or minimally protected by the state.

== Overview, definitions and usage ==
Both conservatism and liberalism have had different meanings over time in different centuries. The term liberal conservatism has been used in quite different ways. It usually contrasts with aristocratic conservatism, which deems the principle of equality as something discordant with human nature and emphasizes instead the idea of natural inequality. As conservatives in democratic countries have embraced typical liberal institutions such as the rule of law, private property, the market economy and constitutional representative government, the liberal element of liberal conservatism became consensual among conservatives. In some countries such as the United Kingdom and the United States, the term liberal conservatism came to be understood simply as conservatism in popular culture, prompting some conservatives who embraced more strongly classical-liberal values to call themselves libertarians instead. However, there are differences between classical liberals and libertarians.

In their embrace of liberal and free market principles, European liberal conservatives are clearly distinguishable from those holding national-conservative, fully socially conservative and/or outright populist views, let alone a right-wing populist posture. Being liberal often involves stressing free market economics and the belief in individual responsibility together with the defense of civil rights and support for a limited welfare state. Compared to other centre-right political traditions such as Christian democracy, liberal conservatives are less socially conservative and more economically liberal, favouring low taxes and minimal state intervention in the economy.

At the European level, Christian democrats and most liberal conservatives are affiliated to the European People's Party (EPP), while liberals (including conservative and social liberals) are affiliated to the Alliance of Liberals and Democrats for Europe Party (ALDE Party). In this context, some traditionally Christian-democratic parties (such as Christian-Democratic and Flemish in Belgium, the Christian Democratic Appeal in the Netherlands, the Christian Democratic Union in Germany and the People's Party in Austria) have become almost indistinguishable from other liberal-conservative parties. On the other hand, newer liberal-conservative parties (such as New Democracy in Greece, the Social Democratic Party in Portugal, the People's Party in Spain, Forza Italia/The People of Freedom/Forza Italia in Italy, the Union for a Popular Movement/The Republicans in France and most centre-right parties from countries once belonging to the Eastern Bloc and Yugoslavia) have not adopted traditional labels, but their ideologies are also a mixture of conservatism, Christian democracy and liberalism.

In the modern European discourse, liberal conservatism usually encompasses centre-right political outlooks that reject at least to some extent social conservatism. This position is also associated with support for moderate forms of social safety net and environmentalism (see also green conservatism and green liberalism). This variety of liberal conservatism has been espoused by Nordic conservatives (the Moderate Party in Sweden, the Conservative Party in Norway and the National Coalition Party in Finland) which have been fending off competition from right-wing populists to their right and do not include Christian democrats; and at times the British Conservative Party. In an interview shortly after taking office as Prime Minister in 2010, David Cameron introduced himself as a liberal conservative. During his first speech to a party conference in 2006, Cameron had defined this as believing in individual freedom and human rights, but being skeptical of "grand schemes to remake the world".

=== Relation to American conservatism ===
In the United States, conservatives often combine the economic individualism of classical liberals with a Burkean form of conservatism that emphasizes the natural inequalities among men, the irrationality of human behavior as the basis for the human drive for order and stability and the rejection of natural rights as the basis for government. From a different perspective, American conservatism (a "hybrid of conservatism and classical liberalism") has exalted three tenets of Burkean conservatism, namely the diffidence toward the power of the state, the preference of liberty over equality and for patriotism while rejecting the three remaining tenets, namely loyalty to traditional institutions and hierarchies, skepticism regarding progress and elitism. Consequently, the term liberal conservatism is not used in the United States. Modern American liberalism happens to be quite different from European liberalism and occupies the centre-left of the political spectrum, in contrast to many European countries where liberalism is often more associated with the centre and centre-right while social democracy makes up a substantial part of the centre-left. The opposite is true in Latin America, where economically liberal conservatism is often labelled under the rubric of neoliberalism both in popular culture and academic discourse.

Although libertarian conservatism has similarities to liberal conservatism with both being influenced by classical liberal thought, libertarian conservatism is far more anti-statist than liberal conservatism and is much more hostile to government intervention in both social and economic matters. Combining conservative cultural principles but with less social intervention and a more laissez faire economic system. Neoconservatism is sometimes described as the same or similar to liberal conservatism in Europe. However, Peter Lawler has regarded neoconservatism in the United States as conservative liberalism and distinguished it from liberal conservatism.

== Classical conservatism and economic liberalism ==
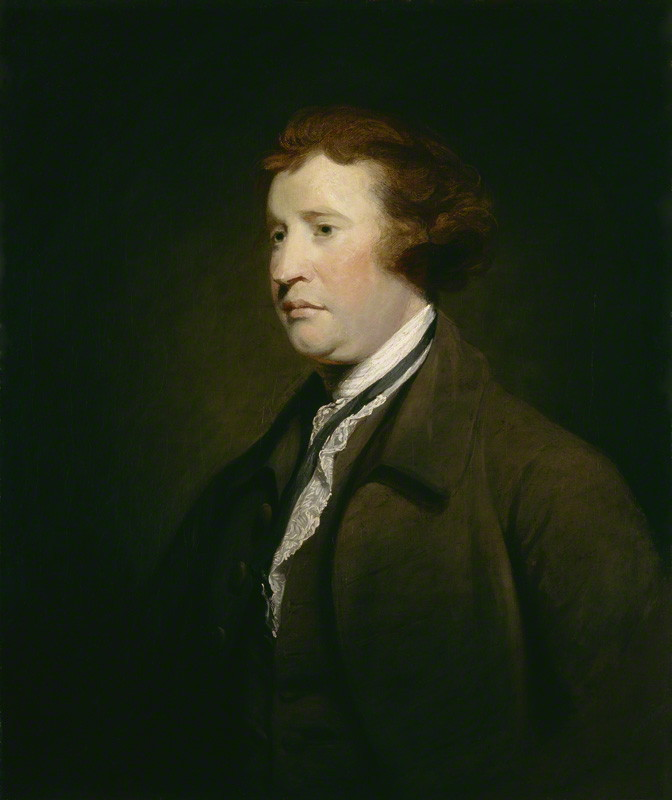
Edmund Burke

Historically, conservatism in the 18th and 19th centuries comprised a set of principles based on concern for established tradition, respect for authority and religious values. This form of traditionalist or classical conservatism is often considered to be exemplified by the writings of Joseph de Maistre in the post-Enlightenment age. Contemporaneous liberalism, now recalled as classical liberalism, advocated both political freedom for individuals and a free market in the economic sphere. Ideas of this sort were promulgated by John Locke, Montesquieu, Voltaire, Jean-Jacques Rousseau, Ben Franklin, Thomas Jefferson, Thomas Paine, Edward Gibbon, David Hume, Adam Smith, Jeremy Bentham and John Stuart Mill, who are respectively remembered as the fathers of liberalism, including economic liberalism, the separation of church and state, social liberalism and utilitarianism.

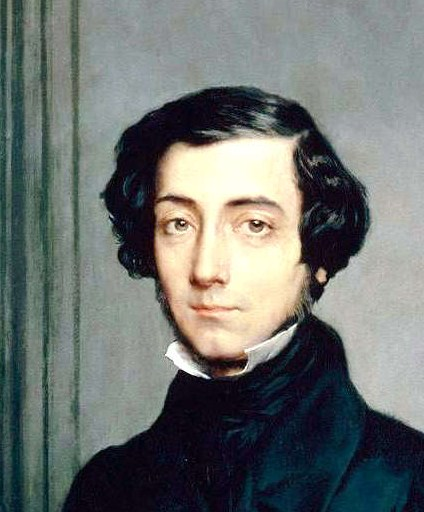
Alexis de Tocqueville

According to scholar Andrew Vincent, the maxim of liberal conservatism is "economics is prior to politics". Others emphasize the openness of historical change and a suspicion of tyrannical majorities behind the hailing of individual liberties and traditional virtues by authors such as Edmund Burke and Alexis de Tocqueville as the basis of current liberal conservatism which can be seen both in the works of Raymond Aron and Michael Oakeshott. However, there is general agreement that the original liberal conservatives were those who combined conservative social attitudes with an economically liberal outlook, adapting a previous aristocratic understanding of natural inequalities between men to the rule of meritocracy, without directly criticizing privileges of birth as long as individual liberties were guaranteed. Over time, the majority of conservatives in the Western world came to adopt free market economic ideas as the Industrial Revolution progressed and the monarchy, aristocracy and clergy lost their wealth and power, to the extent that such ideas are now generally considered as part of conservatism. Nonetheless, the term liberal is used in most countries to describe those with free-market economic views. This is the case in continental Europe, Australia and Latin America.

== Liberal-conservative parties or parties with liberal-conservative factions ==
=== Current parties ===
- Albania: Democratic Party of Albania
- Algeria: Democratic National Rally
- Andorra: Democrats for Andorra
- Argentina: Republican Proposal, Democratic Party
- Australia: Country Liberal Party, Liberal Party of Australia, Liberal National Party of Queensland, National Party of Australia
- Austria: Austrian People's Party
- Bahamas: Free National Movement
- Belarus: United Civic Party of Belarus
- Belgium: New Flemish Alliance
- Botswana: Botswana Democratic Party
- Brazil: Liberal Party, Democratic Renewal Party, Republicans (Brazil), New Party, Podemos
- Bulgaria: Union of Democratic Forces, Citizens for the Development of Bulgaria
- Canada: Conservative Party of Canada
- Chile: National Renewal
- Costa Rica: Social Christian Unity Party
- Croatia: Croatian Democratic Union
- Cyprus: Democratic Rally
- Czech Republic: Civic Democratic Party, TOP 09, Mayors and Independents
- Denmark: Venstre, Conservative People's Party, Liberal Alliance
- Egypt: New Wafd Party
- Estonia: Estonian Reform Party
- Fiji: People's Alliance, Social Democratic Liberal Party
- Finland: National Coalition Party, Centre Party
- France: The Republicans, Horizons
- Germany: Christian Democratic Union of Germany, Free Democratic Party, Free Voters
- Ghana: New Patriotic Party
- Greece: New Democracy
- Greenland: Feeling of Community
- Hungary: Tisza Party
- Iceland: Independence Party
- Iran: Voice of the Nation
- Ireland: Fine Gael, Fianna Fáil
- Israel: Likud, New Hope
- Italy: Forza Italia, Us Moderates
- Japan: Liberal Democratic Party (Note: Bordering nationalism since the Second Abe Cabinet.)
- Latvia: Unity
- Liechtenstein: Patriotic Union
- Lithuania: Homeland Union
- Mexico: National Action Party
- Morocco: Constitutional Union, National Rally of Independents
- Mongolia: Democratic Party
- Myanmar: National League for Democracy
- Netherlands: People's Party for Freedom and Democracy JA21
- New Zealand: National Party
- North Macedonia: VMRO-DPMNE
- Norway: Conservative Party
- Pakistan: Pakistan Muslim League (N)
- Philippines: Partido Federal ng Pilipinas
- Poland: Civic Coalition, Polska 2050, Trzecia Droga
- Portugal: Social Democratic Party
- Romania: National Liberal Party
- Russia: Civic Platform
- Serbia: People's Party, Serbian Progressive Party
- Slovakia: Democrats, NOVA, Civic Conservative Party, For the People
- Slovenia: Slovenian Democratic Party, Democrats
- South Africa: Democratic Alliance
- Spain: People's Party
- Sri Lanka: United National Party
- Sweden: Moderate Party
- Taiwan: Kuomintang
- Thailand: Pheu Thai Party, Democrat Party
- Turkey: Justice and Development Party, (Note: The AKP was described as a liberal-conservative and conservative-liberal, but there is controversy; a study by the V-Dem Institute at the University of Gothenburg in Sweden found that the AKP is illiberal.) Democrat Party (current), Future Party, DEVA
- Ukraine: European Solidarity
- United Kingdom: Conservative Party (factions)
- United States: Republican Party (factions)
- Uruguay: National Party

=== Historical parties or factions ===
- Brazil: Democratic Social Party, Democrats
- Canada: Progressive Conservative Party of Canada
- Czech Republic: Civic Democratic Alliance, Freedom Union – Democratic Union, Realists
- Estonia: Res Publica Party
- France: National Centre of Independents and Peasants, Union for the New Republic, Independent Republicans, Perspectives and Realities Clubs, Union of Democrats for the Republic, Republican Party, Rally for the Republic, Union for French Democracy, Union for a Popular Movement
- Germany: Free Conservative Party
- India: Swatantra Party
- Israel: General Zionists
- Italy: Forza Italia, The People of Freedom, Tyrolean Homeland Party, Italian Liberal Party
- Japan: Japan New Party, New Party Sakigake, Democratic Party of Japan (factions)
- Montenegro: Movement for Changes
- New Zealand: United Future
- Poland: Conservative People's Party,
- Romania: Democratic Convention of Romania, Democratic Liberal Party
- Russia: Party of Growth
- Serbia: G17 Plus
- Slovakia: Slovak Democratic and Christian Union – Democratic Party
- South Korea: Bareunmirae Party
- Spain: Liberal-Conservative Party
- Turkey: Democrat Party (historical), True Path Party, Motherland Party

== Liberal-conservative organisations ==
- United Kingdom: Bright Blue
- Hungary: Everybody's Hungary Movement
- Germany: Konrad Adenauer Foundation

== See also ==
- Conservative liberalism
- Ordoliberalism
- Progressive conservatism

== General and cited references ==
- Heywood, Andrew (2004). Political Theory, Third Edition: An Introduction. Palgrave Macmillan. ISBN 0333961803.
- Johnston, Larry (2007). Politics: An Introduction to the Modern Democratic State (3rd ed.). Peterborough, Ont.: University of Toronto Press. ISBN 978-1-4426-0040-9.
- Johnston, Larry (2011). Politics: An Introduction to the Modern Democratic State (4th ed.). Toronto: University of Toronto Press. ISBN 978-1-4426-0533-6.
- McAnulla, Stuart (2006). British Politics: A Critical Introduction. A&C Black. ISBN 978-0-826-46155-1.
- Turner, Rachel S. (2008). Neo-Liberal Ideology: History, Concepts and Policies: History, Concepts and Policies. Edinburgh: Edinburgh University Press. ISBN 978-0-748-63235-0.
- van de Haar, Edwin (2015). Degrees of Freedom: Liberal Political Philosophy and Ideology. New Brunswick, NJ: Transaction Publishers. ISBN 978-1-412-85575-4.
- Vincent, Andrew (2009). Modern Political Ideologies. John Wiley & Sons. ISBN 978-1-4443-1105-1.
