= 1964 Italian regional elections =

Regional elections were held in some regions of Italy during 1964. These included:

- Friuli-Venezia Giulia on 10 May; this led to a Christian Democracy coalition government.
- Trentino-Alto Adige on 15 November.
