= 1964 Trentino-Alto Adige/Südtirol regional election =

The Trentino-Alto Adige/Südtirol regional election of 1964 took place on 15 November 1964.

Following inter-ethnic tensions with the German minority, the Christian Democracy formed an organic Centre-left majority with the Democratic Socialists and the Socialists, joined by the FPÖ-sister party THP.

== Results ==
=== Regional Council ===
Party	votes	votes (%)	seats
Christian Democracy	168,088	36.6	19
South Tyrolean People's Party	134,188	29.3	16
Italian Socialist Party	37,496	8.2	4
Italian Democratic Socialist Party	27,534	6.0	3
Italian Communist Party	20,747	4.5	2
Italian Social Movement	18,240	4.0	2
Italian Liberal Party	17,775	3.9	2
Trentino Tyrolean People's Party	13,756	3.0	2
Craftsman-Farmer Alliance	6,307	1.4	1
Italian Socialist Party of Proletarian Unity	6,079	1.3	-
Tyrolean Homeland Party	5,258	1.2	1
Others	3,245	0.7	-
Total	458,713	100.0	52

Source: Trentino-Alto Adige/Südtirol Region

=== Trentino ===
Party	votes	votes (%)	seats
Christian Democracy	138,492	57.8	16
Italian Socialist Party	25,716	10.7	3
Italian Democratic Socialist Party	19,165	8.0	2
Trentino Tyrolean People's Party	13,756	5.7	2
Italian Communist Party	12,696	5.3	1
Italian Liberal Party	12,362	5.2	1
Craftsman-Farmer Alliance	6,307	2.6	1
Italian Social Movement	4,625	1.9	1
Italian Socialist Party of Proletarian Unity	4,124	1.7	-
Others	2,472	1.0	-
Total	239,715	100.0	27

Source: Trentino-Alto Adige/Südtirol Region

=== South Tyrol ===
Party	votes	votes (%)	seats
South Tyrolean People's Party	134,188	61.3	16
Christian Democracy	29,596	13.5	3
Italian Social Movement	13,615	6.2	1
Italian Socialist Party	11,780	5.4	1
Italian Democratic Socialist Party	8,369	3.8	1
Italian Communist Party	8,051	3.7	1
Italian Liberal Party	5,413	2.5	1
Tyrolean Homeland Party	5,258	2.4	1
Italian Socialist Party of Proletarian Unity	1,955	0.9	-
Others	773	0.4	-
Total	218,998	100.0	25

Source: Trentino-Alto Adige/Südtirol Region
