= 1959 Italian regional elections =

The Italian regional elections of 1959 were regional elections held in Aosta Valley and Sicily on 17 May and 7 June. This was the third regional election in Aosta Valley and the fourth in Sicily.

== Result ==
=== Aosta Valley ===
Parties	votes	votes (%)	seats
UV–PCI–PSI–PSDI dissidents	30,214	51.4	25
DC–PLI–PSDI	28,539	48.6	10
Total	58,753	100.0	35

Sources: Regional Council of Aosta Valley and Istituto Cattaneo

=== Sicily ===
Parties	votes	votes (%)	seats
Christian Democracy	937,734	38.6	33
Italian Communist Party	518,611	21.3	20
Social Christian Sicilian Union	257,023	10.6	9
Italian Socialist Party	237,708	9.8	12
Italian Social Movement	183,788	7.6	8
Italian Democratic Party	115,296	4.7	3
Italian Liberal Party	90,890	3.7	2
Italian Democratic Socialist Party	52,583	2.2	2
Others	35,587	1.5	-
Total	2,426,220	100.0	90

Sources: Istituto Cattaneo and Sicilian Regional Assembly
