= 2000 Italian referendum =

A seven-part abrogative referendum was held in Italy on 21 May 2000. Voters were asked whether they approved of the repealing of laws on topics including election funding, the electoral system, the judiciary, employment and union dues. Although all but one of the seven proposals were approved by voters, the voter turnout of 32% was well below the 50% threshold and the results were invalidated.

== Results ==
=== Repealing of the law on the reimbursement of election spending ===
Choice	Votes	%
Yes	10,004,581	71.1
No	4,073,688	28.9
Invalid/blank votes	1,718,565	–
Total	15,796,834	100
Registered voters/turnout	49,067,694	32.2
Source: Nohlen & Stöver

=== Repealing of the section of the electoral law on proportional seats ===
Choice	Votes	%
Yes	11,637,524	82.0
No	2,551,693	18.0
Invalid/blank votes	1,729,261	–
Total	15,918,748	100
Registered voters/turnout	49,067,694	32.4
Source: Nohlen & Stöver

=== Repealing of the law on the proportional election of Superior Council judges ===
Choice	Votes	%
Yes	9,125,465	70.6
No	3,805,250	29.4
Invalid/blank votes	2,704,066	–
Total	15,634,781	100
Registered voters/turnout	49,067,694	31.9
Source: Nohlen & Stöver

=== Separating the careers of magistrates between judgeships and government ministries ===
Choice	Votes	%
Yes	9,237,713	69.0
No	4,150,241	31.0
Invalid/blank votes	2,293,271	–
Total	15,681,225	100
Registered voters/turnout	49,067,694	32.0
Source: Nohlen & Stöver

=== Repealing of the law allowing judges to hold other positions ===
Choice	Votes	%
Yes	10,200,692	75.2
No	3,360,487	24.8
Invalid/blank votes	2,135,349	–
Total	15,696,528	100
Registered voters/turnout	49,067,694	32.0
Source: Nohlen & Stöver

=== Repealing of the law forcing employers of over 15 people to re-employ workers sacked without sufficient reason ===
Choice	Votes	%
Yes	4,923,381	33.4
No	9,834,046	66.6
Invalid/blank votes	1,195,958	–
Total	15,953,385	100
Registered voters/turnout	49,067,694	32.5
Source: Nohlen & Stöver

=== Banning trade unions from collecting dues automatically through provident associations ===
Choice	Votes	%
Yes	8,632,445	61.8
No	5,331,053	38.2
Invalid/blank votes	1,837,449	–
Total	15,800,947	100
Registered voters/turnout	49,067,694	32.2
Source: Nohlen & Stöver
