= 2008 Italian regional elections =

Regional elections were held in several regions of Italy during 2008. These included:

- Friuli-Venezia Giulia on 13 and 14 April
- Sicily on 13 and 14 April
- Aosta Valley on 25 May
- Trentino-Alto Adige on 26 October and 9 November
- Abruzzo on 14 and 15 December
