= 1998 Italian regional elections =

Regional elections were held in some regions of Italy during 1998. These included:

- Aosta Valley on 31 May
- Friuli-Venezia Giulia on 14 June
- Trentino-Alto Adige on 22 November
