= 1949 Italian regional elections =

The Italian regional elections of 1949 refer to the regional election were held in Aosta Valley and Sardinia on 24 April and 8 May. This was the first regional election for both region and the second regional election in Italy after the 1947 in Sicily.

== Result ==
=== Aosta Valley ===
Parties	votes	votes (%)	seats
DC – UV	17,118	43.6	28
PSI – PCI	13,034	33.2	7
Aosta Valley Regional Rally	6,533	16.6	-
Italian Democratic Group	2,598	6.6	-
Total	39,283	100.0	35

Sources: Regional Council of Aosta Valley and Istituto Cattaneo

=== Sardinia ===
Parties	votes	votes (%)	seats
Christian Democracy	196,918	34.0	22
Italian Communist Party	112,311	19.4	13
Monarchist National Party	67,141	11.6	7
Sardinian Action Party	60,525	10.4	7
Sardinian Socialist Action Party	38,081	6.6	3
Italian Social Movement	35,402	6.1	3
Italian Socialist Party	34,858	6.0	3
Italian Workers' Socialist Party	16,829	2.9	1
Italian Liberal Party	11,775	2.0	1
Common Man's Front	4,838	0.9	-
Others	707	0.1	-
Total	579,385	100.0	60

Sources: Regional Council of Sardinia and Istituto Cattaneo
