= 1968 Trentino-Alto Adige/Südtirol regional election =

The Trentino-Alto Adige/Südtirol regional election of 1968 took place on 17 November 1968.

An agreement was signed with the German minority: the two provinces became Autonomous Provinces, with both provincial and regional powers, while the Autonomous Region retained its statal-devolved powers. The SVP so accepted a new alliance with the Christian Democracy. With the activation of the ordinary regions in the rest of Italy, the legislature term rose to five years.

== Results ==
=== Regional Council ===
Party	votes	votes (%)	seats
Christian Democracy	175,626	37.1	20
South Tyrolean People's Party	137,982	29.1	16
Italian Socialist Party–Italian Democratic Socialist Party	53,810	11.4	6
Italian Communist Party–Italian Socialist Party of Proletarian Unity	37,443	7.9	4
Trentino Tyrolean People's Party	19,922	4.2	2
Italian Liberal Party	17,278	3.7	2
Italian Social Movement	15,108	3.2	1
Italian Republican Party	8,731	1.8	1
Social Progressive Party of South Tyrol	5,332	1.1	-
Craftsman-Farmer Alliance	2,275	0.5	-
Total	473,507	100.0	52

Source: Trentino-Alto Adige/Südtirol Region

=== Trentino ===
Party	votes	votes (%)	seats
Christian Democracy	142,892	58.1	16
Italian Socialist Party–Italian Democratic Socialist Party	37,482	15.2	4
Trentino Tyrolean People's Party	18,182	7.4	2
Italian Communist Party	16,148	5.6	2
Italian Liberal Party	11,406	4.6	1
Italian Socialist Party of Proletarian Unity	7,726	3.1	1
Italian Republican Party	5,998	2.4	1
Italian Social Movement	4,049	1.6	-
Craftsman-Farmer Alliance	2,275	0.9	-
Total	246,158	100.0	27

Source: Trentino-Alto Adige/Südtirol Region

=== South Tyrol ===
Party	votes	votes (%)	seats
South Tyrolean People's Party	137,982	60.7	16
Christian Democracy	32,734	14.4	4
Italian Socialist Party–Italian Democratic Socialist Party	16,328	7.2	2
Italian Communist Party–Italian Socialist Party of Proletarian Unity	13,569	6.0	1
Italian Social Movement	11,059	4.9	1
Italian Liberal Party	5,872	2.6	1
Social Progressive Party of South Tyrol	5,332	2.4	-
Italian Republican Party	2,733	1.2	-
Total	227,349	100.0	25

Source: Trentino-Alto Adige/Südtirol Region
