= 1999 Italian referendum =

18 April 1999
- Abolition of mixed-member proportional representation for 25% of the seats in the Chamber of Deputies
- Outcome: Proposal failed as voter turnout was below 50%

Results
Choice	Votes	%
Yes	21,161,866	91.52%
No	1,960,022	8.48%
Valid votes	23,121,888	94.58%
Invalid or blank votes	1,325,633	5.42%
Total votes	24,447,521	100.00%
Registered voters/turnout	49,309,060	49.58%

An abrogative referendum on the electoral law was held in Italy on 18 April 1999. Voters were asked whether they approved of replacing the mixed-member proportional representation electoral system (in which 75% of seats in Parliament were elected in single-member constituencies and 25% by compensatory proportional representation) with one based solely on single-member constituencies, with the 25% of seats instead allocated to the second-placed in the constituencies with the most votes. The proposal was supported by larger parties, but opposed by smaller ones. Although the proposal was approved by 92% of voters, turnout was only 49.58% (i.e., just over 200,000 voters below the threshold), resulting in the referendum being invalidated as the threshold of 50% was not passed.

== Results ==
Choice	Votes	%
For	21,161,866	91.52
Against	1,960,022	8.48
Total	23,121,888	100.00
Valid votes	23,121,888	94.58
Invalid/blank votes	1,325,633	5.42
Total votes	24,447,521	100.00
Registered voters/turnout	49,309,060	49.58
Source: Ministry of the Interior
