= 1963 Italian regional elections =

Regional elections were held in some regions of Italy during 1963. These included:

- Sicily on 9 June
- Aosta Valley on 27 October
