= 2001 Italian regional elections =

Regional elections were held in some regions of Italy during 2001. These included:

- Sicily on 24 June
- Molise on 11 November
