= Gerold Meraner =

Italian politician (1940–2023)

Member of the Landtag of South Tyrol
- In office 13 December 1983 – 12 December 1993

Personal details
- Born: 9 March 1940 Eppan an der Weinstraße, Italy
- Died: 26 August 2023 (aged 83) Eppan an der Weinstraße, Italy
- Party: PDU (until 1988); FPS (1987–1989); UfS (1989–1991); Independent (after 1991)
- Education: University of Innsbruck; University of Padua; University of Urbino

Gerold Meraner (9 March 1940 – 26 August 2023) was an Italian politician. A member of the Party of Independents, the Freedom Party of South Tyrol, the Union for South Tyrol, and finally an independent, he served in the Landtag of South Tyrol from 1983 to 1993.

Meraner died in Eppan an der Weinstraße on 26 August 2023, at the age of 83.
