= 1973 Trentino-Alto Adige/Südtirol regional election =

The Trentino-Alto Adige/Südtirol regional election of 1973 took place on 18 November 1973.

The administration DC-SVP was expanded with the Democratic Socialists and the Republicans.

The council was greatly expanded to 70 seats.

== Results ==
=== Regional Council ===
| Party | votes | votes (%) | seats |
|---|---|---|---|
| Christian Democracy | 174,443 | 35.6 | 26 |
| South Tyrolean People's Party | 132,186 | 27.0 | 20 |
| Italian Socialist Party | 41,000 | 8.4 | 6 |
| Italian Communist Party | 36,957 | 7.5 | 5 |
| Italian Democratic Socialist Party | 23,225 | 4.7 | 3 |
| Trentino Tyrolean People's Party | 23,080 | 4.7 | 3 |
| Italian Social Movement | 15,296 | 3.1 | 2 |
| Italian Republican Party | 13,156 | 2.7 | 1 |
| Social Democratic Party of South Tyrol | 12,037 | 2.5 | 2 |
| Italian Liberal Party | 8,409 | 1.7 | 1 |
| Social Progressive Party of South Tyrol | 4,012 | 0.8 | 1 |
| Party of Independents | 2,615 | 0.5 | - |
| Others | 3,792 | 0.8 | - |
| Total | 490,208 | 100.0 | 70 |

Source: Trentino-Alto Adige/Südtirol Region

=== Trentino ===
| Party | votes | votes (%) | seats |
|---|---|---|---|
| Christian Democracy | 141,453 | 55.3 | 21 |
| Italian Socialist Party | 27,786 | 10.9 | 4 |
| Italian Communist Party | 23,614 | 9.2 | 3 |
| Trentino Tyrolean People's Party | 23,080 | 9.0 | 3 |
| Italian Democratic Socialist Party | 15,166 | 5.9 | 2 |
| Italian Republican Party | 9,922 | 3.9 | 1 |
| Italian Social Movement | 5,865 | 2.3 | 1 |
| Italian Liberal Party | 5,603 | 2.2 | 1 |
| Others | 3,417 | 1.3 | - |
| Total | 255,906 | 100.0 | 36 |

Source: Trentino-Alto Adige/Südtirol Region

=== South Tyrol ===
| Party | votes | votes (%) | seats |
|---|---|---|---|
| South Tyrolean People's Party | 132,186 | 56.4 | 20 |
| Christian Democracy | 32,990 | 14.1 | 5 |
| Italian Communist Party | 13,343 | 5.7 | 2 |
| Italian Socialist Party | 13,214 | 5.6 | 2 |
| Social Democratic Party of South Tyrol | 12,037 | 5.1 | 2 |
| Italian Social Movement | 9,431 | 4.0 | 1 |
| Italian Democratic Socialist Party | 8,059 | 3.4 | 1 |
| Social Progressive Party of South Tyrol | 4,012 | 1.7 | 1 |
| Italian Republican Party | 3,234 | 1.4 | - |
| Italian Liberal Party | 2,806 | 1.2 | - |
| Party of Independents | 2,615 | 1.2 | - |
| Others | 375 | 0.2 | - |
| Total | 234,302 | 100.0 | 34 |

Source: Trentino-Alto Adige/Südtirol Region
