= 2006 Italian regional elections =

Regional elections were held in some regions of Italy during 2006. These included:

- Sicily on 28 May
- Molise on 5 and 6 November
