= 1990 Italian referendums =

A three-part abrogative referendum was held in Italy on 3 June 1990, with two questions about hunting and one on health. Turnout was low, with a 43% of the electors participating to the referendum. For the first time since the adoption of the Constitution in 1948, a referendum did not obtain the quorum, and all three were consequently declared null and void.

== Hunting referendums ==
The hunting abrogative referendums concerned two issues:

- a general limitation of legal hunting,
- abolition of free access to open private fields for hunters.

These referendums were the first ones ever proposed by the Italian Greens. Although both referendums had a "yes" victory with more than 90% of votes, they were annulled according to the Italian Constitution which wants a 50% of turnout for a valid referendum.

=== Repealing the law restricting hunting ===
Choice	Votes	%
✓ Yes	17,802,465	92.2
No	1,504,502	7.8
Invalid/blank votes	952,757	–
Total	20,259,724	100
Registered voters/turnout	46,770,159	43.3
Source: Nohlen & Stöver

=== Repealing the law allowing hunting on private properties ===
Choice	Votes	%
✓ Yes	17,909,120	92.3
No	1,497,927	7.7
Invalid/blank votes	862,133	–
Total	20,269,180	100
Registered voters/turnout	46,770,159	43.3
Source: Nohlen & Stöver

== Use of pesticides referendum ==
The third abrogative referendum concerned the right of the Italian Ministry of Health to establish limits for pesticides. The Greens said that these limits was decided upon reasons of political friendship rather than upon scientific bases. Even this referendum, despite its 90% of "yes" votes, was annulled for its low turnout.

Choice	Votes	%
✓ Yes	18,284,638	93.5
No	1,268,865	6.5
Invalid/blank votes	790,616	–
Total	20,344,119	100
Registered voters/turnout	46,770,159	43.5
Source: Nohlen & Stöver
