= Social Democratic Party of South Tyrol =

Social Democratic Party of South Tyrol Sozialdemokratische Partei Südtirols
- Leader: Hans Dietl (1973-1975); Wilhelm Erschbaumer (1975-1981)
- Founded: 1972
- Dissolved: 1983
- Split from: South Tyrolean People's Party
- Ideology: South Tyrolean regionalism Social democracy Christian left
- Political position: Centre-left

The Social Democratic Party of South Tyrol (German: Sozialdemokratische Partei Südtirols, SPS) was a regionalist social-democratic and Christian-social party of German speakers in South Tyrol, Italy, that was active from 1972 to 1983.

== History ==
The party was launched in 1972 by Hans Dietl, former provincial deputy from the left wing of the South Tyrolean People's Party (SVP) and member of the Italian Chamber of Deputies from 1963 to 1972, who was expelled from that party in 1971 for having taken a hard line over an agreement between the provincial and the national government known as il Pacchetto ("the package"). The SPS gathered politicians of diverse ideological provenance, including the former Communist Party of Italy member Silvio Flor junior. Most of its members were organised in or close to the Autonomous South Tyrolean Federation of Trade Unions (ASGB). Despite its name, the party represented rather conservative positions on cultural and nationality issues.

In the 1972 general election Dietl was the candidate of the hard-liners, including the Party of Independents, in the single-seat constituency of Brixen and won 20.8 percent of the vote, the major defection from the SVP since then. SPS obtained its best result in 1973, when it won 5.1% of the votes and got two provincial deputies elected (Hans Dietl, who left the party soon after, and Wilhelm Erschbaumer). It was mostly supported by unionised part-time farmers and rural workers as well as lower middle classes, but did badly among the group of urban industrial workers. Since then the party has suffered a decline in terms of votes as the SVP re-organized itself as a multi-factional catch-all party with the left-wingers united in the Arbeitnehmer ("employees") faction. After Dietl's resignation, the party shifted more towards classical social democracy, identifying itself as a "member of European social democracy" and sister party of the German SPD and Austrian SPÖ. Erschbaumer himself left and re-joined SVP in 1982.

== Electoral results ==
=== Provincial Council ===
Landtag of South Tyrol
Election year	# of overall votes	% of overall vote	# of overall seats won	+/–
1973	12,037	5.1	2 / 34	▲2
1978	5,928	2.2	1 / 34	▼1
1983	3,853	1.4	0 / 35	▼1

== Literature ==
- Joachim Gatterer, "rote milben im gefieder". Sozialdemokratische, kommunistische und grün-alternative Parteipolitik in Südtirol, Studienverlag, Innsbruck-Vienna-Bozen, 2009. ISBN 978-3-7065-4648-5
