= 1988 Italian regional elections =

Regional elections were held in some regions of Italy during 1988. These included:

- Aosta Valley on 26 and 27 June
- Friuli-Venezia Giulia on 26 and 27 June
- Trentino-Alto Adige on 20 November.

The Socialists were considered to be the big winners that May 1988 in local elections in Italy.
