= Tyrolean Homeland Party =

Tyrolean Homeland Party Tiroler Heimatpartei
- Leader: Josef Raffeiner
- Founded: 1964
- Dissolved: 1968
- Split from: South Tyrolean People's Party
- Ideology: South Tyrol regionalism Liberal conservatism (original); Economic liberalism (original); National conservatism (later)
- Political position: Centre-right to Right-wing

The Tyrolean Homeland Party (German: Tiroler Heimatpartei, THP) was a regionalist liberal-conservative political party active in South Tyrol, Italy from 1963 to 1968.

It was launched in 1963 by Josef Raffeiner, former secretary of the South Tyrolean People's Party (SVP) from 1945 to 1947 and then Senator from 1948 to 1958, as a split of part of the economically liberal and liberal-conservative wing of SVP. In the 1963 general election THP took about 4% in the Province and in the 1964 provincial election 2.4% (Raffeiner was elected to the Council). It was the first notable competition to the catch-all SVP for the German-speaking electorate. After that, the party shifted to the right, attracting disgruntled right-wing conservatives. This development was contrary to what Raffeiner had planned and he disbanded the THP in 1968.
