= 1988 Trentino-Alto Adige/Südtirol regional election =

The Trentino-Alto Adige/Südtirol regional election of 1988 took place on 20 November 1988.

The Christian Democratic alliance DC-SVP was joined by the Socialists.

== Results ==
=== Regional Council ===
Party	votes	votes (%)	seats
South Tyrolean People's Party	184,717	30.4	22
Christian Democracy	164,034	27.0	20
Italian Socialist Party	50,266	8.3	5
Green Lists	42,907	7.1	5
Italian Social Movement	39,328	6.5	5
Italian Communist Party	34,486	5.7	4
Trentino Tyrolean Autonomist Party	29,624	4.9	3
Italian Republican Party	15,344	2.5	1
Proletarian Democracy	7,935	1.3	1
South Tyrolean Homeland Federation	7,003	1.2	1
Pensioners' Party	6,775	1.1	-
Italian Democratic Socialist Party	6,014	1.0	1
Italian Liberal Party	5,556	0.9	1
Freedom Party of South Tyrol	4,133	0.7	1
Others	18,609	1.4	-
Total	606,731	100.0	70

Source: Trentino-Alto Adige/Südtirol Region

=== Trentino ===
Party	votes	votes (%)	seats
Christian Democracy	136,286	45.3	17
Italian Socialist Party	37,934	12.6	4
Trentino Tyrolean Autonomist Party	29,624	9.9	3
Italian Communist Party	25,272	8.4	3
Green List	22,358	7.4	3
Italian Republican Party	12,055	4.0	1
Proletarian Democracy	7,935	2.6	1
Italian Social Movement	7,837	2.6	1
Italian Democratic Socialist Party	6,014	2.0	1
Pensioners' Party	5,349	1.8	-
Italian Liberal Party	5,556	1.6	1
Social Democracy Trentino	2,373	0.8	-
Together for the Good Government of Autonomy	1,181	0.4	-
Pensioners' People's Party	1,051	0.3	-
Total	300,825	100.0	35

Source: Trentino-Alto Adige/Südtirol Region

=== South Tyrol ===
Party	votes	votes (%)	seats
South Tyrolean People's Party	184,717	60.4	22
Italian Social Movement	31,491	10.3	4
Christian Democracy	27,748	9.1	3
Alternative Green List	20,549	6.7	2
Italian Socialist Party	12,332	4.0	1
Italian Communist Party	9,214	3.0	1
South Tyrolean Homeland Federation	7,003	2.3	1
Freedom Party of South Tyrol	4,133	1.4	1
List for Alto Adige - Unitarian Movement	3,330	1.1	-
Italian Republican Party	3,289	1.1	-
Pensioners' Party	1,426	0.5	-
Pensioners' People's Party	674	0.2	-
Total	305,906	100.0	35

Source: Trentino-Alto Adige/Südtirol Region
