= Alfons Benedikter =

Italian politician

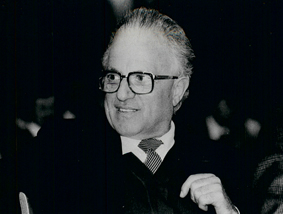

Personal details
- Born: 14 March 1918 Pettneu am Arlberg, Tyrol, Austria
- Died: 3 November 2010 (aged 92)
- Party: Südtiroler Volkspartei (SVP)

Military service
- Branch/service: Italian, then German, army
- Years of service: 1940–1945

Alfons Benedikter (14 March 1918 – 3 November 2010) was a politician from South Tyrol, Italy. He was a member of the provincial parliament for 50 years and for 40 years he acted as a member of the regional government of the region Trentino-Alto Adige/Südtirol and later the provincial government of South Tyrol.

== Career ==
During his youth, Alfons Benedikter experienced the Italian fascist oppression and discrimination policy towards the German national minority in his home village of Schlanders. He was educated in law and Russian at the University of Naples, from which he graduated in 1940.

After the creation of the South Tyrol Option Agreement in 1939, Benedikter's family remained living in the province. Consequently, Benedikter served five years in the army, first in the Italian army, and later in the German Wehrmacht, deployed on many battlefields between Russia and Southern Italy during World War II. At the end of the war, his knowledge of the Russian language saved his life. Benedikter continued to cultivate his passion for the Russian language and culture and repeatedly visited Russia with political missions. Beginning in 1960, Alfons Benedikter lived in Frangart (a frazione of Eppan an der Weinstraße) close to Bolzano, the capital of the province.

== Politics ==
Benedikter was a founding member of the South Tyrolean People's Party, the main political party of South Tyrol. From 1948 he represented his party in the regional government. From 1960 until 1988, he served as a minister of the provincial government in charge of social housing, economic and urban planning and environmental protection. From 1960 to 1988, he also was the deputy Landeshauptmann (governor) under Silvius Magnago. In the 1960s, Benedikter repeatedly represented South Tyrol within the UN in New York, when the issue was debated as a major international conflict between Austria and Italy. Benedikter was involved in the elaboration of the so-called “Package for South Tyrol”, but finally he refused its acceptance as a conflict solution. Nevertheless, from 1972 to 1989, as a member of the joint Italian-Tyrolean commissions for the implementation of the autonomy statute, he contributed decisively to achieving maximum self-governance for his province as an autonomous province of Italy. In those years, Benedikter took part in approximately 60 sessions of the Italian government in Rome. At the end of the 1980s, Benedikter returned to his previous scepticism with regard to the “package-solution” and opposed the official final “declaration of conflict conclusion” to be expressed by Austria before the UN. He left the SVP and, together with Eva Klotz, founded the new party, “Union für Südtirol”, vowing for self-determination. From 1989 to 1998, he represented this new opposition party within the provincial parliament. Apart from his role as an architect of the autonomy of South Tyrol, Benedikter was a strenuous defender of the environment and landscape of his home country.

Benedikter died on 3 November 2010 at the age of 92.
