= Eva Klotz =

Italian politician

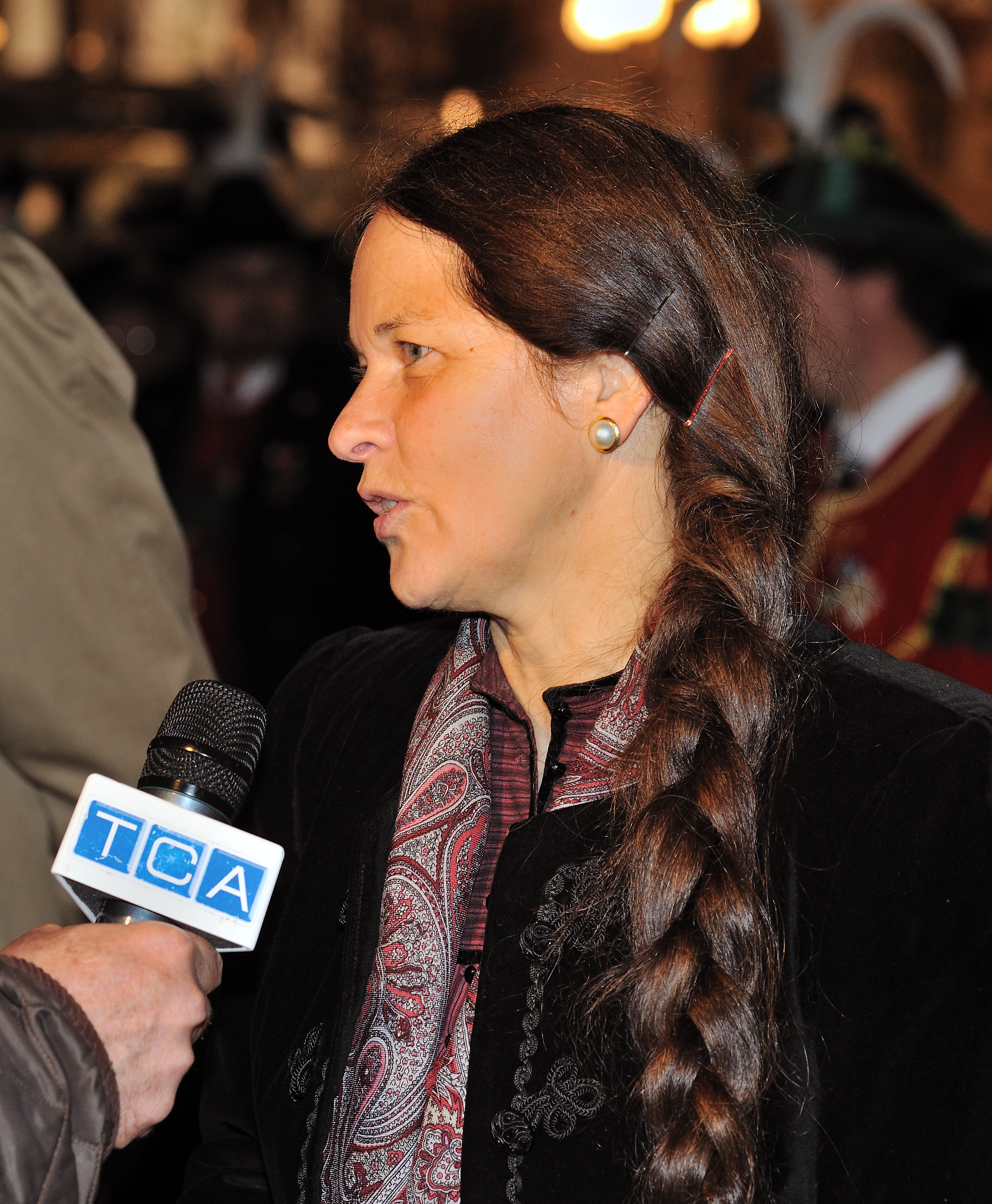
Eva Klotz at a Schützen get-together in Bolzano on 8 November 2008

Eva Klotz (born 4 June 1951) is an Italian politician. She was a member of the Landtag of South Tyrol for 31 years, from 1983 until 2014. She represented several parties during that time, latterly (from 2007) the South Tyrolean Freedom.

== Life and career ==
Eva Klotz is the eldest of six children of South Tyrolean militant Georg Klotz. She studied education at the University of Innsbruck, specializing in history, folklore, and philosophy. After completing her studies in 1974, she taught German, geography, Latin, and history at high-schools all over South Tyrol.

Between 1980 and 1983 she was a town councilor for the South Tyrolean People's Party in the city of Bolzano, the capital of South Tyrol. In 1983 she became a state representative, once again for the South Tyrolean People's Party. At this point she decided to give up teaching and dedicate herself solely to politics and the cause of South Tyrolean self-determination.

In 1989, unhappy with the moderate politics espoused by Silvius Magnago, she left the South Tyrolean People's Party and started her own political movement called the Union for South Tyrol. She was an elected representative in the South Tyrolian parliament on the Union for South Tyrol ticket between 1989 and 2007.

In 2007 conflicts arose between members of the Union for South Tyrol: Eva Klotz on the one side and Andreas Pöder on the other. Unable to find a compromise deemed satisfactory by both parties, Eva Klotz, Sven Knoll, and others left the Union and created a splinter group called South Tyrolean Freedom. In the ranks of this new political formation she was again elected to the South Tyrolian parliament in 2008 and 2013. In 2014, Klotz resigned her mandate and left the Landtag for personal reasons.

Klotz currently lives in Bolzano with her second husband Hans Bachmann.

== Works ==
- Georg Klotz. Freiheitskämpfer für die Einheit Tirols (ISBN 3-85485-083-2)
