= 1978 Trentino-Alto Adige/Südtirol regional election =

The Trentino-Alto Adige/Südtirol regional election of 1978 took place on 19 November 1978.

The alliance DC-SVP continued with the Democratic Socialists.

== Results ==
=== Regional Council ===
Party	votes	votes (%)	seats
Christian Democracy	166,652	30.4	22
South Tyrolean People's Party	163,502	29.8	21
Italian Communist Party	48,809	8.9	7
Trentino Tyrolean People's Party	39,101	7.1	5
Italian Socialist Party	34,590	6.3	4
New Left	22,068	4.0	2
Italian Democratic Socialist Party	14,605	2.7	2
Italian Social Movement	12,812	2.3	2
Italian Republican Party	12,626	2.3	1
Italian Liberal Party	8,016	1.5	1
Proletarian Democracy	6,567	1.2	1
Social Democratic Party of South Tyrol	5,928	1.1	1
Party of Independents	3,539	0.7	1
Union of Independents for Trentino	3,201	0.6	-
Others	5,947	1.1	-
Total	547,963	100.0	70

Source: Trentino-Alto Adige/Südtirol Region

=== Trentino ===
Party	votes	votes (%)	seats
Christian Democracy	137,847	49.0	18
Trentino Tyrolean People's Party	36,820	13.1	5
Italian Communist Party	30,028	10.7	4
Italian Socialist Party	25,645	9.1	3
New Left	12,315	4.4	1
Italian Republican Party	9,742	3.5	1
Italian Democratic Socialist Party	8,473	3.0	1
Proletarian Democracy	5,412	1.9	1
Italian Liberal Party	5,091	1.8	1
Italian Social Movement	5,028	1.8	1
Union of Independents for Trentino	3,201	1.1	-
Others	1,497	0.5	-
Total	281,099	100.0	36

Source: Trentino-Alto Adige/Südtirol Region

=== South Tyrol ===
Party	votes	votes (%)	seats
South Tyrolean People's Party	163,502	61.3	21
Christian Democracy	28,805	10.8	4
Italian Communist Party	18,781	7.4	3
New Left	9,753	3.7	1
Italian Socialist Party	8,945	3.4	1
Italian Social Movement	7,784	2.9	1
Italian Democratic Socialist Party	6,132	2.3	1
Social Democratic Party of South Tyrol	5,928	2.2	1
Party of Independents	3,539	1.3	1
Italian Liberal Party	2,925	1.1	1
Italian Republican Party	2,884	1.1	1
Others	7,886	2.9	-
Total	266,864	100.0	34

Source: Trentino-Alto Adige/Südtirol Region
