= Party of Independents (South Tyrol) =

Party of Independents Partei der Unabhängigen
- Leader: Hans Dietl
- Founded: 1972
- Dissolved: 1987
- Split from: South Tyrolean People's Party
- Succeeded by: Freedom Party of South Tyrol
- Ideology: South Tyrolean regionalism Conservatism; Populism; Liberalism (first years)
- Political position: Centre-right to Right-wing

The Party of Independents (German: Partei der Unabhängigen, PdU) was a regionalist political party active in South Tyrol from 1972 to 1988.

== Ideology ==
Initially considered liberal, the party defined itself as committed to Christian values but not subscribing to any ideology. In its later period, it became a right-wing conservative party with populist tendencies and was perceived as a vehicle of protest against "the powers that be".

== History ==
The party was launched in 1972 under the name of "Electoral committee of Independents" (Wahlverband der Unabhängigen) in support of the candidacy of Hans Dietl, a member of the Chamber of Deputies for the South Tyrolean People's Party who had been expelled from that party in 1971 for having taken a hard line over an agreement between the provincial and the national government known as il Pacchetto ("the package"). In the 1972 general election Dietl won 20.8% of the vote in the single-seat constituency of Brixen, the largest defection from SVP so far. After the election, Dietl launched the Social Democratic Party of South Tyrol, while others formed the PdU.

The PdU won 1.3% of the vote in the 1978 provincial election and 2.4% in 1983, electing Hans Lunger and Gerold Meraner respectively to the Provincial Council. Meraner later transformed the party into the Freedom Party of South Tyrol, which was launched in 1988.
