= Lazio 1 (Chamber of Deputies constituency) =

- Chamber of Deputies; Electoral constituency
- Region: Lazio
- Electorate: 2,890,202 (2018)
- Major settlements: Rome

Current constituency
- Created: 1993
- Seats: 39
- Members: M5S (16); PD (9); FI (5); FdI (4); Lega (3); LeU (1); +E (1)

Lazio 1 is one of the 29 constituencies (Italian: circoscrizioni) represented in the Chamber of Deputies, the lower house of the Italian parliament. The constituency currently elects 39 deputies. Its boundaries correspond to those of the Metropolitan City of Rome, within the Lazio region. The electoral system uses a parallel voting system, which act as a mixed system, with 37% of seats allocated using a first-past-the-post electoral system and 61% using a proportional method, with one round of voting.

The constituency was first established by the Mattarella law on 4 August 1993 and later confirmed by the Calderoli law on 21 December 2005 and by the Rosato law on 3 November 2017.

== Members of the Parliament ==
=== 2018–present ===
Single-member districts
District			Electoral list	Deputy	Parliamentary group		Ref.
N.	Name	Map	Electoral list	Deputy	At election	Current	Ref.
01	Rome–Trionfale		Centre-left coalition	Paolo Gentiloni (until 2 December 2019)	Democratic Party		
01	Rome–Trionfale		Centre-left coalition	Roberto Gualtieri (4 March 2020 – 4 November 2021)	Democratic Party		
01	Rome–Trionfale		Centre-left coalition	Cecilia D'Elia (from 19 January 2022)	Democratic Party		
02	Rome–Montesacro		Centre-left coalition	Marianna Madia	Democratic Party		
03	Rome–Castel Giubileo		Centre-right coalition	Annagrazia Calabria	Forza Italia		
04	Rome–Collatino		Five Star Movement	Massimiliano De Toma	Five Star Movement	Brothers of Italy	
05	Rome–Torre Angela		Five Star Movement	Lorenzo Fioramonti	Five Star Movement	Green Italia	
06	Rome–Tuscolano		Five Star Movement	Felice Mariani	Five Star Movement	League	
07	Rome–Pomezia		Five Star Movement	Marco Bella	Five Star Movement		
08	Rome–Ardeatino		Centre-left coalition	Patrizia Prestipino	Democratic Party		
09	Rome–Fiumicino		Five Star Movement	Emilio Carelli	Five Star Movement	Together for the Future	
10	Rome–Gianicolense		Centre-left coalition	Riccardo Magi	More Europe		
11	Rome–Primavalle		Five Star Movement	Emanuela Del Re (until 30 June 2021)	Five Star Movement		
11	Rome–Primavalle		Centre-left coalition	Andrea Casu (since 8 October 2021)	Democratic Party		
12	Guidonia Montecelio		Five Star Movement	Sebastiano Cubeddu	Five Star Movement		
13	Velletri		Centre-right coalition	Marco Silvestroni	Brothers of Italy		
14	Marino		Centre-right coalition	Maria Spena	Forza Italia		

Multi-member districts
District			Party	Deputy
N.	Name	Map	Party	Deputy
01	Lazio 1 – 01		Five Star Movement	Carla Ruocco
01	Lazio 1 – 01		Five Star Movement	Massimiliano Enrico Baroni
01	Lazio 1 – 01		Five Star Movement	Vittoria Baldino
01	Lazio 1 – 01		Democratic Party	Luciano Nobili
01	Lazio 1 – 01		Democratic Party	Flavia Piccoli Nardelli
01	Lazio 1 – 01		League	Giuseppe Basini
01	Lazio 1 – 01		Forza Italia	Andrea Ruggieri
01	Lazio 1 – 01		Brothers of Italy	Federico Mollicone
02	Lazio 1 – 02		Five Star Movement	Federico Daga
02	Lazio 1 – 02		Five Star Movement	Manuel Tuzi
02	Lazio 1 – 02		Five Star Movement	Angela Salafia
02	Lazio 1 – 02		Democratic Party	Matteo Orfini
02	Lazio 1 – 02		Democratic Party	Michele Anzaldi
02	Lazio 1 – 02		League	Barbara Saltamartini
02	Lazio 1 – 02		Forza Italia	Antonio Angelucci
02	Lazio 1 – 02		Brothers of Italy	Maria Teresa Bellucci
02	Lazio 1 – 02		Free and Equal	Stefano Fassina
03	Lazio 1 – 03		Five Star Movement	Stefano Vignaroli
03	Lazio 1 – 03		Five Star Movement	Francesca Flati
03	Lazio 1 – 03		Five Star Movement	Francesco Silvestri
03	Lazio 1 – 03		Democratic Party	Roberto Morassut
03	Lazio 1 – 03		Democratic Party	Micaela Campana
03	Lazio 1 – 03		League	Sara De Angelis
03	Lazio 1 – 03		Forza Italia	Sestino Giacomoni
03	Lazio 1 – 03		Brothers of Italy	Fabio Rampelli
