= Nazareno Pact =

2014–2015 political agreement in Italy

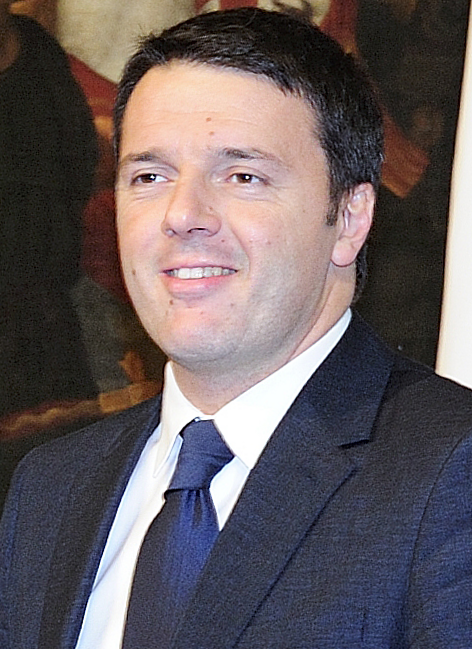
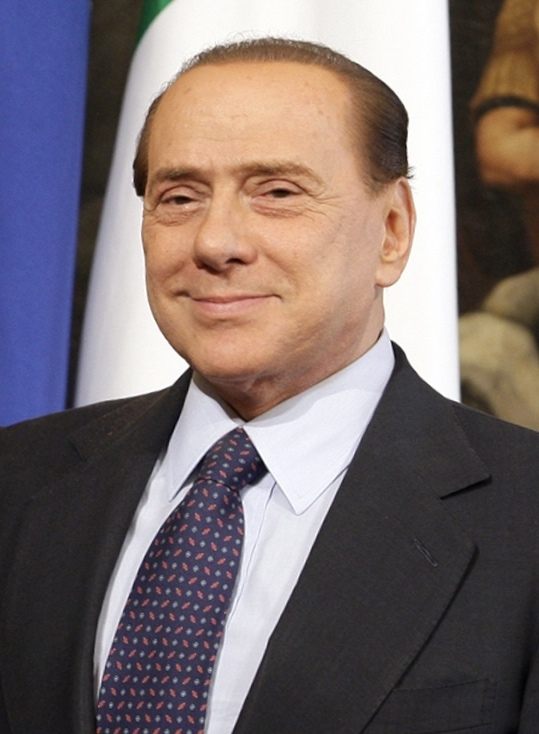
Matteo Renzi and Silvio Berlusconi, the signers of the political agreement

The Nazareno Pact (Italian: patto del Nazareno) was a political agreement signed between the Democratic Party (PD) secretary Matteo Renzi (who became Prime Minister of Italy on 22 February 2014) and the Forza Italia (FI) president Silvio Berlusconi on 18 January 2014 with the objectives of implementing a series of reforms, including the reform of Title V of Part II of the Italian constitution, the transformation of the Senate of the Republic into the Chamber of Autonomies, and the approval of a new electoral law. The agreement was contested by the Five Star Movement (M5S), which was the main opposition group, and was also criticised by dissidents within both the PD and FI.

The electoral law was based on the two-round system used for local and regional governments, and envisioned a proportional representation system, with a strong majority bonus awarded through a runoff between the two most popular electoral coalitions or electoral lists if neither would reach a certain electoral threshold in the first round. The mechanism was inspired by the direct election of mayors and was adopted to ensure a certain winner. It was also similar to the Spanish model as a proportional system based on small constituencies, which naturally tend to favour two-party politics, with the addition of a majority bonus to ensure government stability. Finally, it was based on a revision of Mattarellum, the majoritarian system adopted by Italy from 1993 to 2001, with correctives that included a majority bonus instead of the proportional recovery to still ensure a clear majority government for the winner.

As a journalistic and political term, the name derived by metonymy from the toponym of Largo del Nazareno in Rome, near the PD headquarters, where Renzi and Berlusconi held their first declared meeting. The agreement expired in February 2015 following the election of Sergio Mattarella as president of Italy. Various commentators speculated about the further contents of the agreement. Ultimately, most of the more significant proposed reforms did not come to pass, as the constitutional reform was rejected in the 2016 Italian constitutional referendum and the electoral law, which had to be revised and saw a long process, was ruled unconstitutional and a different law (Rosatellum, which is still the electoral law as of 2026) was adopted. As a result of the failure of his reform proposals, Renzi resigned as Prime Minister.

== History ==
After winning the 2013 PD leadership election on 8 December, Renzi identified a series of institutional reforms, including those concerning the Senate of the Republic and the electoral law, as key points of his political agenda. On 2 January 2014, he published an open letter on his personal website to the main Italian political forces in which he proposed three different models for electoral reform on which to reach an agreement to amend the Porcellum, the electoral law of 2005 declared partially unconstitutional by the Constitutional Court of Italy. On the same day, Berlusconi declared himself in favour of the possibility of bilateral meetings and consultations with the PD, while the Five Star Movement (M5S) announced through its leader Luigi Di Maio that the electoral law could not be approved by an Italian Parliament they deemed "morally illegitimate", calling instead for the dissolution of Parliament and snap elections.

During a television interview on Le invasioni barbariche on 15 January, Renzi announced that he would meet with Berlusconi two days later at the PD headquarters to discuss a joint reform plan. The meeting was attended by the two leaders, as well as by the PD's secretariat spokesman Lorenzo Guerini and Berlusconi's close advisor Gianni Letta. At the end of the meeting, Renzi declared that he was in "deep agreement" with Berlusconi on three issues: the reform of Title V of Part II of the Constitution, eliminating reimbursements to regional council groups; the end of perfect bicameralism, transforming the Senate of the Republic into a Chamber of Autonomies without direct election of representatives; and a change to the electoral law. The Nazareno Pact was so named because of the position of the PD headquarters in Sant'Andrea delle Fratte, near Largo del Nazareno.

The Italicum (the electoral law of 2015) agreement was discussed by the PD's national leadership on 20 January and approved with 111 votes in favour, 0 against, and 34 abstentions, despite some objections raised by Gianni Cuperlo and Giuseppe Civati. No vote was held within FI to accept the content of the reforms, despite several members expressing their opposition. The draft agreement of 17 January did not include the details of the three reforms but only the main guidelines; the details were discussed from time to time in a series of meetings between the PD and FI representatives. Following the establishment of the Renzi government on 22 February, the new Prime Minister of Italy met with Berlusconi on 14 April, and again on 6 August. The 2015 Italian presidential election resulted in the election of Mattarella as president of Italy and FI declared the Nazareno Pact terminated, ceasing cooperation with the governing majority. This decision was contested by the party faction led by Denis Verdini, who subsequently left FI to form the Liberal Popular Alliance (ALA) and continued to collaborate with the Renzi government.

== Points of the agreement ==
=== Electoral reform ===
The first point of the agreement concerned the modification of the Italian electoral system, which was governed until then by the law authored by Roberto Calderoli during the third Berlusconi government, best known as Porcellum, which the Constitutional Court had declared partially unconstitutional on 15 January 2014. (Note: The Constitutional Court ruled that Article 83, paragraph 1, no. 5, and paragraph 2, of the Presidential Decree no. 361 of March 30, 1957 (Approval of the Consolidated Text of the Laws Containing Provisions for the Election of the Chamber of Deputies); Article 17, paragraphs 2 and 4, of the Legislative Decree no. 533 of 20 December 1993 (Consolidated Text of the Laws Containing Provisions for the Election of the Senate of the Republic); Articles 4, paragraph 2, and 59 of the Presidential Decree no. 361 of 1957, as well as Article 14, paragraph 1, of the Legislative Decree no. 533 of 1993, were unconstitutional insofar as they do not allow voters to express a preference for candidates. For the sentence, see "Porcellum bocciato dalla Consulta: il testo della sentenza". Altalex (in Italian). 14 January 2014. Archived from the original on 15 June 2016.) The new law was immediately renamed Italicum and presented to the press by Renzi at the end of the PD national assembly on 20 January.

Italicum was a mixed electoral system influenced by Italian mayoralty elections (a system that Renzi called the "Mayor of Italy" model), the Spanish model, and Mattarellum, with the main purpose being that of ensuring governing stability and a clear majority. The initial agreement envisaged a corrected proportional representation based on political coalitions, with a majority bonus of 15% if one of the coalitions exceeded 35% of the vote, with a maximum limit of 55%. If neither coalition reached the 35% threshold, a runoff election would be held between the two coalitions with the most votes to assign a bonus that would allow the winning coalition to exceed 50% of the seats in the Chamber of Deputies. Two electoral thresholds were also established for entering Parliament: 5% for coalition parties and 8% for political parties running alone. In this first draft, the electoral districts were small to medium-sized multi-member constituencies, with each party presenting lists of three to six candidates. As the party-list system was based around closed lists, voters were not allowed to directly choose which candidate to vote for.

Following numerous objections from the other majority parties, the bill was amended before being presented to Parliament. The second draft, agreed upon by telephone between the two political leaders, included some adjustments to the thresholds but not to the underlying philosophy: the threshold for access to the majority bonus was increased from 35% to 37%, while the electoral threshold for coalition parties was lowered to 4.5%. The law as drafted was approved by the Chamber of Deputies on 12 March with 365 votes in favour, 156 against, and 40 abstentions. The law approved by the Chamber of Deputies did not establish rules for the Senate of the Republic with the prospect of its indirect election.

The new version of Italicum, which was so radically changed from the first that it was renamed Italicum 2.0, was approved by the Senate of the Republic on 27 January 2015 with the decisive support from FI as the PD minority walked out of the chamber. In February 2015, following the election of Mattarella as president of Italy and the subsequent end of the Nazareno Pact, and due to Renzi's 17 requests to amend Italicum, FI called it an authoritarian and unconstitutional law and announced its vote against it in its third reading. The law was definitively approved on 4 May 2015 with the recourse to a vote of confidence; however, it was never applied in any electoral consultation. In January 2017, the Consitutional Court ruled that it was partially unconstitutional, (Note: For the sentence, see "Sentenza n. 35 del 25 gennaio – 9 febbraio 2017". Gazzetta Ufficiale (in Italian). 15 February 2017. Archived from the original on 17 February 2017.) and was then completely repealed in November 2017 following the approval of the Rosatellum, the electoral law named after the PD deputy Ettore Rosato.

=== Constitutional reform ===
The second point of the Nazareno Pact concerned a constitutional reform aimed at overcoming perfect bicameralism and modifying Title V, which regulates the relationship between the state and the regions of Italy. These reforms were discussed in a second meeting between Renzi and Berlusconi held on 14 April at Chigi Palace. The bill called for a reduction in the number of senators from 315 to 100. These would no longer be directly elected but rather appointed by the regional councils and would include 74 regional councillors, 21 mayors, and 5 distinguished figures appointed by the Italian President. The new Senate would have fewer powers as it would no longer be able to vote on confidence in incumbent governments and would have the primary role of "liaison between the state and the other constituent bodies of the Republic", namely the regions and municipalities of Italy. It would have continued to vote on constitutional reforms and laws, laws on popular referendums, the electoral laws local governments, and family, marriage, and health laws, as well as the ratification of international treaties. It could also have had a consultative role on laws presented to the Chamber of Deputies and on the budget law, proposing amendments that would then be voted on by the Chamber of Deputies. Title V, which divides legislative powers between the state and the regions, was also amended, eliminating concurrent jurisdiction.

The reform proposal, bitterly opposed by the parliamentary opposition and many jurists, was approved with a majority of less than two-thirds of the members of each chamber. Consequently, as required by Article 138 of the Constitution, the measure was not directly promulgated, as the possibility of requesting a referendum to submit it to the voters' judgment was provided for. The popular consultation, requested both on parliamentary initiative and through a collection of signatures, was scheduled for 4 December 2016; unlike other types of referendums, a quorum regarding voter turnout is not required for constitutional referendums. (Note: For further context, see Onida, Valerio; Pedrazza Gorlero, Maurizio, eds. (2011). "Capitolo VI – Il Parlamento". Compendio di diritto costituzionale (in Italian). Milan: Giuffrè Editore. pp. 188–193.) The referendum saw a high turnout, equal to 65.47% of voters, and a clear affirmation of the votes against, equal to 59.12% of valid votes. As a result, the reform (named after Renzi and Maria Elena Boschi but agreed as part of the Nazareno Pact) did not come into force. Moreover, as a consequence of the unfavourable outcome of the referendum, Renzi resigned as Prime Minister.

== Hypotheses about the agreement's further contents ==
The Nazareno Pact fueled numerous hypotheses and theories about possible further contents of the agreement that were kept secret. These hypotheses were advanced by various journalists and commentators, as well as some opposition parties, such as the M5S, which presented parliamentary questions and filed complaints with the prosecutor's office. In particular, Beppe Grillo declared that the agreement would be a sort of "safe conduct" for Berlusconi and his companies in exchange for FI's votes, which were essential for the Renzi government to implement its reform programme. Other complaints arose within the PD due to Verdini's role as intermediary in the agreement, as did the veto on Romano Prodi as president of Italy.

== See also ==
- Referendums in Italy
- Tidö Agreement
