= Maria Elena Boschi =

Italian lawyer and politician (born 1981)

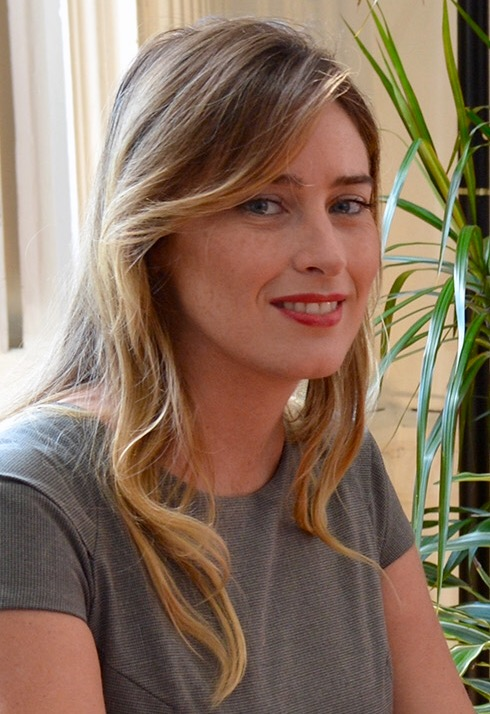
- Boschi in 2016

Secretary of the Council of Ministers
- In office 12 December 2016 – 1 June 2018
- Prime Minister: Paolo Gentiloni
- Preceded by: Claudio De Vincenti
- Succeeded by: Giancarlo Giorgetti

Minister for Constitutional Reforms and Parliamentary Relations
- In office 22 February 2014 – 12 December 2016
- Prime Minister: Matteo Renzi
- Preceded by: Gaetano Quagliariello (Constitutional Reforms); Dario Franceschini (Relations with Parliament)
- Succeeded by: Anna Finocchiaro

Member of the Chamber of Deputies
- Incumbent
- Assumed office 15 March 2013
- Constituency: Tuscany (2013–2018); Bolzano (since 2018)

Personal details
- Born: 24 January 1981 (age 45) Montevarchi, Italy
- Party: PD (2008–2019); IV (since 2019)
- Domestic partner: Giulio Berruti (2020–2025)
- Education: University of Florence
- Profession: Lawyer; politician

Maria Elena Boschi (Italian pronunciation: [maˈriːa ˈɛːlena ˈbɔski]; born 24 January 1981) is an Italian lawyer and politician, member of the Chamber of Deputies since 2013. A Roman catholic, among her supporters she is widely known by the acronym MEB. Boschi left the Democratic Party, and has since 2019 been a member of Matteo Renzi's liberal party Italia Viva (IV).

As a member of the Democratic Party (PD), Boschi served as Minister for Constitutional Reforms and Relations with the Parliament from February 2014 to December 2016, and was delegated to the implementation of the reform programme of the Renzi government. From 12 December 2016 until 1 June 2018, she was the Secretary of the Council of Ministers in the Gentiloni government.

== Early life ==
Boschi was born on 24 January 1981 in Montevarchi but was raised in Laterina, a small town in the province of Arezzo, Tuscany, where her family lived for generations. Her father is Pierluigi Boschi, owner of the farm Il Palagio, member of dozens of agricultural and wine associations of the territory, provincial director of Coldiretti, board member of the Camera di Commercio of Arezzo and from 2011 to 2015 director of the Banca Etruria, of which by 2014 was also vice-president. Her mother is Stefania Agresti, a headmaster who served three terms in the City Council of Laterina, the last of which as vice-mayor; Agresti was also a candidate in 2010 Tuscan regional election for the Democratic Party but she was not elected. Boschi is the first of three siblings: Emanuele Boschi, a public accountant, and Pierfrancesco Boschi, a civil engineer. She grew up in a fervent Roman Catholic family; Boschi always participated in the religious life of her parish, as altar girl, catechist, reader, and volunteer. In 1997, she participated in the World Youth Day in Paris. In 2000, she took part to the one organized in Rome for the Jubilee.

Boschi received a classical education in high school Francesco Petrarca of Arezzo and passed the final exam with 100/100. She then graduated with 110/110 cum laude in Law at the University of Florence. She was a member of the Examining Board of Civil Law of the School of Specialization for the Legal Professions of Florence. Moreover, Boschi was a member of the board of directors of Publiacqua, a company in charge of water management for the entire province of Florence from 2009 to 4 June 2013, when she was elected to the Chamber of Deputies.

== Early political career ==
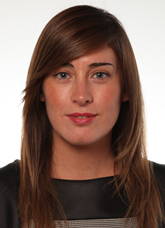
Boschi as a member of the Chamber of Deputies in 2013

In 2008, Boschi entered in politics during the primary election to become mayor of Florence, where she was the spokesman of the committees in support of the candidacy of Michele Ventura, a close collaborator of the social democratic leader Massimo D'Alema. Ventura's main challenger was the young president of Florence's province Matteo Renzi, who went on to win the election. After the primary, she became a close adviser to Renzi.

Boschi was a member of the city direction of the Democratic Party in Florence and organized numerous editions of Leopolda, the annual meeting of the Democratic faction near to Renzi. Moreover, together with Simona Bonafé and Sara Biagiotti, she was one of the three coordinators of Matteo Renzi's campaign for the 2012 Italian centre-left primary election.

After the 2013 Italian general election, Maria Elena Boschi was elected to the Chamber of Deputies in the constituency of Tuscany. On 9 December 2013, after the victory of Renzi in the Democratic leadership election in December 2013, she joined the National Secretariat of the PD, as Head of Institutional Reforms. On 21 February 2014, following the fall of the Enrico Letta government, Boschi was appointed Minister for Constitutional Reforms and Relations with the Parliament in the Renzi Cabinet; on the following day she was sworn in by the President Giorgio Napolitano.

== Government positions ==
=== Minister for Constitutional Reforms (2014–2016) ===
Boschi was the Minister for Constitutional Reforms and Relations with Parliament with responsibility for the implementation of the Renzi government program; she is the first woman in the history of the Italian Republic to become Minister of Constitutional Reforms and the second as Minister of Relations with the Parliament. Upon becoming prime minister, Matteo Renzi stated that one of her most important tasks was to achieve constitutional reforms. The Italian institutional framework had remained essentially unchanged since 1 January 1948, when the Italian Constitution first came into force after being enacted by the Constituent Assembly on 22 December 1947.

The first stage of reform package aimed to abolish the "perfect bicameralism", which gave identical powers to the Chamber of Deputies and the Senate; the reforms would substantially decrease the membership and power of the Senate. Under the reforms: the Senate's power to force the resignation of the Government by refusing to grant a vote of confidence would be removed; only a few types of bills, including the constitutional bills, constitutional amendments, laws regarding local interests, referendums and the protection of linguistic minorities, would need to be passed by the Senate; the Senate could only propose amendments to bills in some cases, with the Chamber of Deputies always having the final word; and the membership of the Senate would be changed, with regional representatives appointed in a manner virtually identical to Germany's Bundesrat.

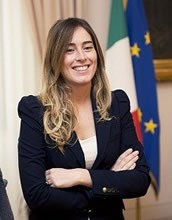
Boschi in 2015

On 11 March 2014, the Chamber of Deputies approved both the plans to overhaul the Senate and the second stage of Renzi's constitutional reforms, a flagship electoral reform law that would see Italy's voting system overhauled. On 26 March, despite objections raised by several parties in the coalition, the Government won a vote in the Senate on the bill reforming the provinces, with 160 voting in favour and 133 against. After several amendments to the initial text, the reform passed the examination of the Committee on Constitutional Affairs, whose speakers were Senators Anna Finocchiaro (Democrat) and Roberto Calderoli (Lega Nord). Finally on 8 August, the Senate approved the constitutional and electoral reform proposed by the government.

In April 2014, Renzi and Boschi proposed that Italy adopt what he called Italicum, a proportional representation system with a majority bonus for the party which obtained over 40% of the vote, to provide for stable and long-term government. To approve the new electoral law, which was opposed by the Five Star Movement and a minority of his own Democratic Party, the government gained the support of former Prime Minister Silvio Berlusconi, who was still the leader of Forza Italia, despite having been expelled from the Senate due to his sentence for tax evasion. The alliance between Renzi and Berlusconi was named the "Nazareno Pact", from the name of the street in Rome where the headquarters of the Democratic Party are located, where the two leaders met for the first time to discuss the reform. Despite concern from some within the Democratic Party, the Italicum was given final approval by the Italian Senate on 27 January 2015, thanks to support from Forza Italia Senators.

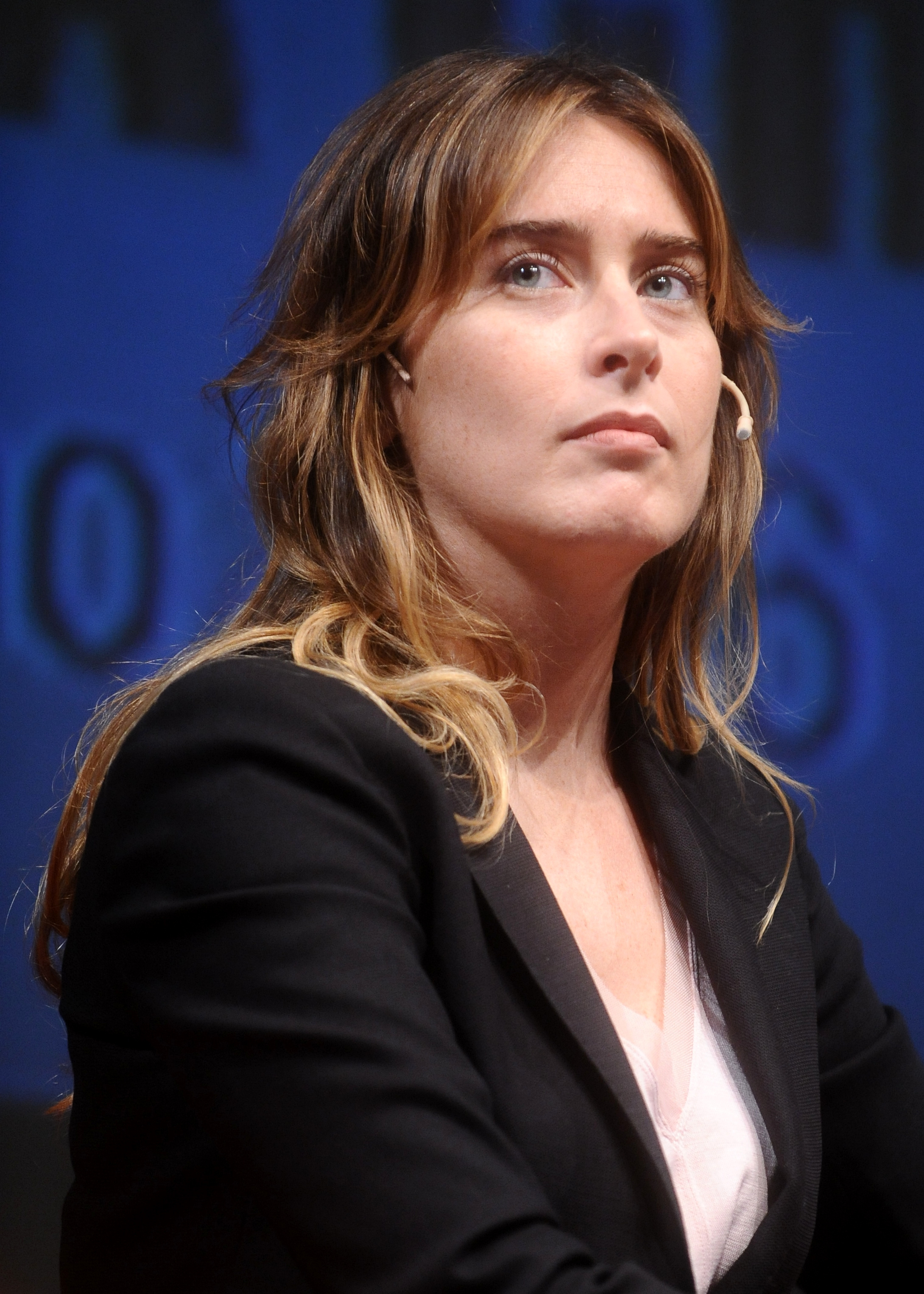
Boschi for the 2016 Festival of Economics in Trento

On 28 April 2015, concerned that the reform may not pass, the government announced he would hold a confidence vote to approve the electoral reform changes. The Five Star Movement, Forza Italia and some left-wing Democratic Party members strongly opposed this decision, with some seeking to draw comparisons between Renzi and Benito Mussolini. It would be only the third time that an electoral law was twinned with a confidence vote, after Mussolini's Acerbo Law and Alcide De Gasperi's "Scam law". On 4 May the Chamber of Deputies finally approved the electoral changes with 334 votes for and 61 votes against, the latter including a faction of the PD. The reforms will take full effect in July 2016.

==== 2016 constitutional referendum ====
After constitutional reforms had passed both the Chamber of Deputies and the Senate multiple times, the government announced that he would hold a constitutional referendum in December 2016 to seek approval for the changes; since the reform was not approved by more than two-thirds of the Parliament, according to article 138 of the Constitution, a referendum could be required. Voters would be asked whether they approve of amending the Italian Constitution to transform the Senate of the Republic into a "Senate of Regions" composed of 100 senators made up of regional councillors and mayors of large cities. Maria Elena Boschi was appointed by Renzi as the organizer of the "Yes Committees", in favor of the reform. Following early results, which indicated that the "No" side was clearly ahead, Renzi conceded defeat and resigned.

=== Secretary of the Council of Ministers (2016–2018) ===
On 11 December 2016, the Foreign Affairs Minister Paolo Gentiloni was asked by President Mattarella to form a new government. On the following day Gentiloni was officially sworn in as the new head of the government and Boschi was appointed new Secretary of the Council of Ministers. She was the first woman to have ever held the office.

=== Member of Italia Viva (2019–present) ===
In September 2019, former Secretary of the Democratic Party Matteo Renzi founded a liberal and Europeanist party, Italia Viva. Boschi left the Democratic Party and became a member of Italia Viva.

== Controversies ==
=== Banca Etruria scandal ===
On 18 December 2015, the Chamber of Deputies rejected (with 129 yes and 373 no) a no-confidence motion promoted by the Five Star Movement as a result of the decree "save the banks" issued in November 2015. Among the banks affected by the decision therefore included Banca Etruria, of which Pierluigi Boschi, the father of Maria Elena, was the vice president at the time of receivership in February 2015, while her brother was responsible of cost management, until March 2015.

=== Petroleum scandal in Basilicata ===
On 31 March 2016, Federica Guidi (the then Minister of Economic Development) resigned amid allegations that she had sought to shape last year's budget law to favour an oil project from which her partner, Gianluca Gemelli, who was inquired, stood to benefit financially. By telephone wiretap investigation file it shows that Boschi was mentioned many times by Federica Guidi. On the same day, parliamentary opposition have announced a new no-confidence motion against Maria Elena Boschi. The motion was rejected on the basis that Boschi didn't know Minister Guidi was doing a favour to her partner and there was no penal relevance.
