= By-elections in Italy =

By-elections (Italian: elezioni suppletive) are held in Italy whenever a parliamentary seat becomes vacant in either the Chamber of Deputies or the Senate of the Republic. By-elections were reintroduced by the electoral law of 2017.

== Overview ==
The new Italian electoral law approved in 2017 and nicknamed Rosatellum, provides the election of members of Parliament in 232 single-member districts for the Chamber of Deputies and in 116 for the Senate of the Republic. Whenever a seat of this kind becomes vacant, a by-election is called, and a new representative is elected.

== List of by-elections ==
- 2019 Italian by-elections
- 2020 Italian by-elections
- 2021 Italian by-elections
- 2022 Italian by-elections
- 2023 Italian by-elections
- 2026 Italian by-elections
