= 2021 Italian by-elections =

Special elections in Italy to fill vacancies

The 2021 Italian by-elections were held to replace members of the Italian Parliament. The elections were held on 3–4 October 2021.

== List ==
=== Chamber of Deputies ===
==== Tuscany 12: Siena ====
The constituency in Tuscany

An election was held in the constituency of Siena, Tuscany to replace Pier Carlo Padoan (Democratic Party), who resigned in October 2020. Padoan was included in the board of directors of the Italian bank Unicredit, and therefore left his post in the Chamber of Deputies due to possible conflicts of interest.

Initially expected by March 31, 2021, the elections were postponed to October 3 and 4 of the same year, due to the COVID-19 pandemic in Italy.

In May 2021, the centre-right coalition nominated Tommaso Marrocchesi Marzi, a wine entrepreneur from Siena, as its candidate.

The Democratic Party (PD) nominated party Secretary and former Prime Minister Enrico Letta, who had not been a member of Parliament since 2015.

2021 Siena by-election
Party or coalition	Candidate	Votes	%	+/−
Centre-left	Enrico Letta (PD)	33,391	49.92	+13.74
Centre-right	Tommaso Marrocchesi Marzi (League)	25,303	37.83	+5.55
Communist Party	Marco Rizzo	3,134	4.69	+3.33
Power to the People	Elena Golini	1,971	2.95	+1.41
Italexit	Mauro Aurigi	1,157	1.73	—
Italian National Movement	Angelina Rappuoli	993	1.48	—
3V Movement	Tommaso Agostini	935	1.40	—
Total votes		66,885	100.00	—
Turnout		71,201	35.59	—
Centre-left hold				

==== Lazio 1, 11: Rome (Primavalle) ====
The constituency in Lazio

An election was held in the constituency of Rome Primavalle in Lazio to replace Emanuela Del Re (Five Star Movement). In June 2021, she was appointed EU Special Representative for the Sahel by the Foreign Affairs Council, and therefore she left her post in the Italian Parliament.

The Five Star Movement (M5S) proposed the nomination of its leader and former Prime Minister Giuseppe Conte, who later rejected the proposal.

2021 Rome-Primavalle by-election
Party or coalition	Candidate	Votes	%	+/−
Centre-left	Andrea Casu (PD)	32,735	43.47	+19.61
Centre-right	Pasquale Calzetta (FI)	28,276	37.55	+4.63
Communist Party	Danilo Ballanti	4,984	6.62	+6.07
Independent	Luca Palamara	4,463	5.93	—
Italexit	Giampaolo Bocci	3,033	4.03	—
PLE–Renaissance	Giovanni Antonio Cocco (PLE)	1,814	2.41	—
Total votes		75,305	100.00	—
Turnout		90,768	44.62	—
Centre-left gain from Five Star Movement				

== See also ==
- By-elections in Italy
