= 2022 Italian by-elections =

Special elections in Italy to fill vacancies

One by-election was held in Italy in 2022.

== List ==
=== Chamber of Deputies ===
==== Lazio 1: Rome, Trionfale ====
The constituency in Lazio.

The by-election in the constituency of Trionfale (Rome) was held on 16 January 2022 to replace Roberto Gualtieri (Democratic Party). He was elected as the new Mayor of Rome in the 2021 Rome municipal election, and thus resigned from the Chamber of Deputies on 4 November 2021.

Democratic Party Secretary Enrico Letta proposed to the former Prime Minister Giuseppe Conte to run for the by-election, but his candidacy was strongly opposed by Carlo Calenda, who had run in the 2021 Rome municipal election and got the first place in 1st Municipio. Calenda stated that he would run against Conte if he decided to run as well. Ultimately, Conte declined the proposal stating that he was too busy with the reorganization of the Five Star Movement. The turnout was extremely low, with only 11.33% of the population turning out to vote, 7% less than at the 2020 by-election.

2022 Rome, Trionfale by-election
Party or coalition	Candidate	Votes	%	+/−
Centre-left	Cecilia D'Elia (PD)	12,401	59.43	–2.81
Centre-right	Simonetta Matone (Lega)	4,678	22.42	–3.66
Italia Viva	Valerio Casini	2,698	12.93	—
Power to the People	Beatrice Gamberini	676	3.24	+0.83
Il N-uovo Mondo	Lorenzo Vanni	412	1.97	—
Total votes		20,865	100.00	—
Turnout		21,010	11.33	—
Centre-left hold				

== See also ==
- By-elections in Italy
- 2023 Italian by-election
