= Luca Palamara =

Italian politician (born 1969)

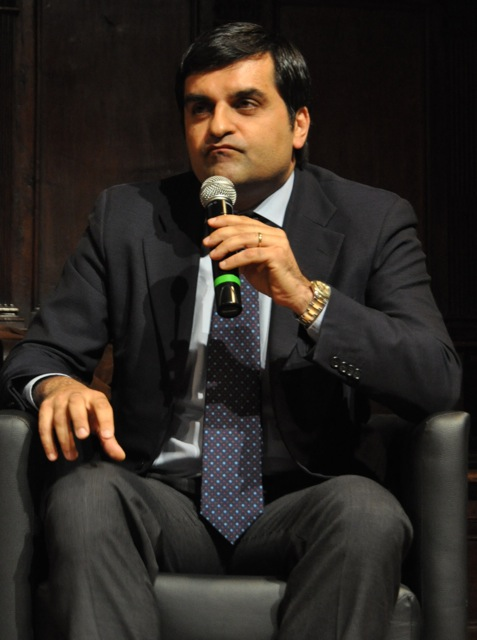
- Palamara in 2011

Member of the High Council of the Judiciary
- In office 25 September 2014 – 20 June 2018

Personal details
- Born: 22 April 1969 (age 56)

Luca Palamara (born 22 April 1969) is an Italian politician and former magistrate. He was a member of the High Council of the Judiciary from 2014 to 2018, and served as president of the National Association of Magistrates from 2008 to 2012. In the 2021 Rome-Primavalle by-election, he was an independent candidate for the Chamber of Deputies. In the 2024 European Parliament election, he was the lead candidate of Popular Alternative in Central Italy.
