= Marco Silvestroni =

Italian politician (born 1962)

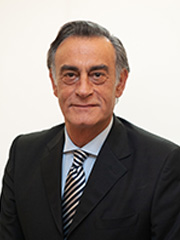
- Silvestroni in 2022

Member of the Senate of the Republic
- Incumbent
- Assumed office 13 October 2022
- Constituency: Lazio

Member of the Chamber of Deputies
- In office 23 March 2018 – 12 October 2022
- Constituency: Lazio 1

Personal details
- Born: 8 November 1962 (age 63)
- Party: Brothers of Italy

Marco Silvestroni (born 8 November 1962) is an Italian politician of Brothers of Italy who was elected member of the Senate of the Republic in 2022. He previously served in the Chamber of Deputies from 2018 to 2022.
