= Vittoria Baldino =

Italian politician and lawyer (born 1988)

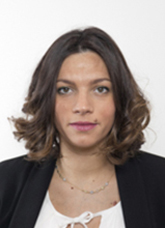

Member of the Parliament of Italy
- Incumbent
- Assumed office 19 March 2018
- Parliamentary group: M5S (since 2018)
- Constituency: Lazio 1 (2018–2022); Calabria 1 (since 2022)

Personal details
- Born: 28 May 1988 (age 37) Rossano, Italy
- Party: M5S (since 2012)
- Occupation: Politician, lawyer

Vittoria Baldino (born 28 May 1988) is an Italian politician and lawyer. She was elected to be a deputy to the Parliament of Italy in the 2018 Italian general election for the Legislature XVIII of Italy.

== Career ==
Baldino was born in 1988 in Rossano, in the Southern Italy region of Calabria. She graduated in law from the Sapienza University of Rome with a thesis on finance science. Since 2016, she has been practicing in Rome as a lawyer specialized in administrative and urban planning law. In the 2018 general election on 5 March, she was elected to the Italian Parliament to represent the district of Lazio for the Five Star Movement. She was subsequently replaced by Angela Salafia (it) but was subsequently reinstated in a different Lazio district.

In the 2022 Italian general election on 25 September, she was narrowly defeated in the first-past-the-post constituency of Calabria 1 with 35.25% of the vote compared to the 38.12% of the centre-right coalition candidate. She was elected through proportional representation in the same constituency.
