= 2023 Italian by-elections =

Special elections in Italy to fill vacancies

One by-election was held in Italy in 2023. The election was held at the same time as the 2023 Trentino-Alto Adige/Südtirol provincial elections and Foggia's local elections.

== List ==
=== Senate ===
==== Lombardy 06: Monza ====
A by-election was held in the constituency of Monza on 22 and 23 October 2023 to replace senator and former prime minister Silvio Berlusconi (Forza Italia), who died of leukemia on 12 June 2023. Forza Italia member Adriano Galliani won the election with 51.46% of the votes. His main opponent in the election, right-to-die activist Marco Cappato, conceded defeat.

2023 Monza by-election
Party or coalition	Candidate	Votes	%	+/−
Centre-right (Note: Endorsed by Italia Migliore, VèP, and PdF)	Adriano Galliani (FI)	67,801	51.46	+1.20
With Cappato (Note: Endorsed by Eumans, +E, RI, Action, Volt Italy, LDE, Base Italia, PD, M5S, PSI, EV, Pos, and SI)	Marco Cappato (Eumans)	52,079	39.53	-5.55 (Note: Sum of CSX, A–IV, and M5S)
South With North	Cateno De Luca (ScN)	2,313	1.76	New
People's Union	Giovanna Capelli (UP)	2,278	1.73	+0.77
Italian Communist Party	Domenico Di Modugno (PCI)	2,172	1.65	New
Sovereign Popular Democracy	Daniele Giovanardi (DSP)	1,884	1.43	+0.45
Force of the People	Lillo Musso (FdP)	1,661	1.26	New
Democracy and Subsidiarity	Andrea Brenna (DeS)	1,566	1.19	New
Total votes		131,754	100.00	0.00
Turnout		135,163	19.25	-51.80
Centre-right hold				

== See also ==
- By-elections in Italy

== Sources ==
- "Guida alle elezioni suppletive di Monza". Pagella Politica (in Italian). 19 October 2023.
- "Suppletive Monza: domenica e lunedì brianzoli alle urne, 8 candidati per una poltrona". La Gazzetta del Mezzogiorno (in Italian). 19 October 2023.
- Cottone, Nicoletta (20 October 2023). "Elezioni suppletive a Monza: duello Galliani-Cappato per il seggio di Berlusconi". Il Sole 24 Ore (in Italian). ISSN 2499-4944.
