= Andrea Casu =

Italian politician (born 1981)

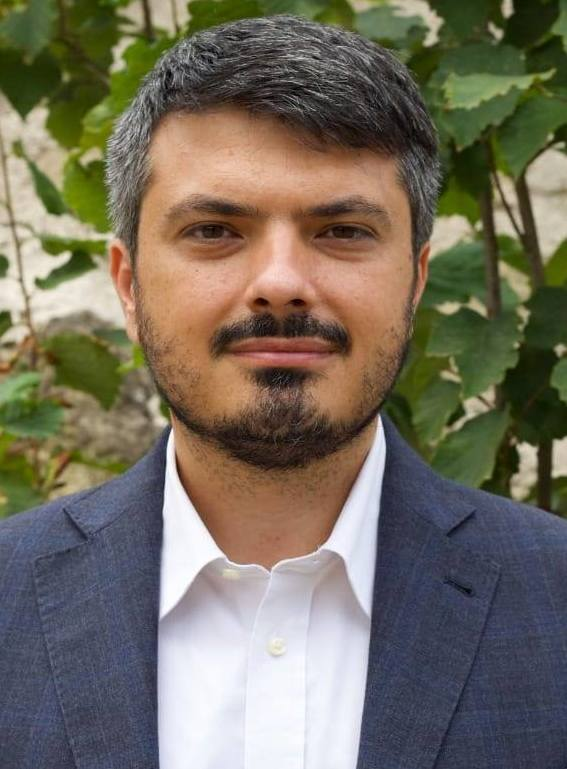
- Casu in 2021

Member of the Chamber of Deputies
- Incumbent
- Assumed office 8 October 2021
- Preceded by: Emanuela Del Re
- Constituency: Lazio 1

Personal details
- Born: 6 November 1981 (age 44) Rome, Italy
- Party: Democratic Party
- Education: University of Rome Unitelma Sapienza

Andrea Casu (born 6 November 1981) is an Italian politician of the Democratic Party. Since 2021, he has been a member of the Chamber of Deputies. He was previously a member of the City Council of Rome, and was elected secretary of the Rome branch of the Democratic Party in 2017.
