= Italian electoral law of 1993 =

Reform of the electoral laws of Italy

The Italian electoral law of 1993 (better known as Mattarellum) was a reform of the electoral laws of Italy, passed on 4 August 1993. The nickname, conceived by Giovanni Sartori, derived from its author Sergio Mattarella. The law was also nicknamed Minotaur (from the mythical creature of Greek Mythology), for being a combination of two different parts (majority and proportional system).

The law replaced the proportional representation used in Italy since 1946, just after the end of the Second World War. It was replaced in 2005 by another law named Porcellum in reference to a comment by Roberto Calderoli.

== History ==
=== Background ===
The Mattarella law was technically the accidental result of the combination of different historic events. After World War II, proportional representation (PR) was restored for the election of the Chamber of Deputies as it was before the Fascist era. The Senate of the Republic was at its first democratic election, so a first-past-the-post (FPTP) was proposed, but the supermajority clause, which was introduced to win a direct mandate, vanished that aim, and the generality of the Senate seats was itself assigned by PR. Constituencies for the Senate effectively were a ”pro forma” in this mechanism of localized lists, so they were not changed when in 1963 a constitutional reform expanded the Parliament with a 33% more seats.

In the early 1990s, the Italian political system was largely discredited, and PR was seen as a font of corruption. A group of reformers, led by Mario Segni, launched the idea of a referendum. However, according to the Italian constitution, referendums in Italy cannot be propositional, but they can only abolish a part of a law, so the reformers could only ask to abolish the supermajority clause for the Senate. The 1993 Italian referendum was a large success, transforming the Senate electoral law into a FPTP, but after 1963, there were fewer constituencies than seats in the Senate, one fourth less of the total needed, so those seats had to be filled by PR amongst the losers of the FPTP races. To ensure government stability, the law of the Chamber of Deputies had to be changed in a similar way, and a parallel voting of 3/4 of FPTP and 1/4 of PR was introduced by the Matterellum.

=== Approval ===
The new electoral law was approved in August 1993 by DC, PSI, PSDI and regionalist parties LN, SVP (only for the reform of the election of the Senate) and UV.

== New constituencies ==
Map of the 475 uninominal circonscriptions for the Chamber of Deputies

== See also ==
- 1993 Italian referendum
- Italian electoral law of 2005
- Italian electoral law of 2015
- Italian electoral law of 2017
