= Cecilia D'Elia =

Italian politician (born 1963)

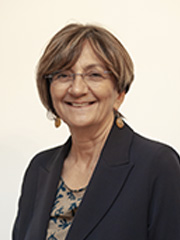

Member of the Senate
- Incumbent
- Assumed office 13 October 2022
- Constituency: Lazio

Member of the Chamber of Deputies
- In office 19 January 2022 – 13 October 2022
- Constituency: Rome - Trionfale

Personal details
- Born: Cecilia D'Elia Riviello; 31 July 1963 (age 63) Potenza, Italy
- Party: PCI (1988–1991); PDS (1991–1998); DS (1998–2007); SEL (2010–2016); PD (since 2018)
- Education: University of Siena
- Profession: Politician

Cecilia D'Elia Riviello (born 31 July 1963) is an Italian politician who has sat in the Chamber of Deputies since winning the 2022 Rome Trionfale by-election, which was triggered when Roberto Gualtieri resigned after being elected Mayor of Rome.

In the 2022 Italian general election, she was elected to the Italian senate.

== See also ==
- List of members of the Italian Chamber of Deputies, 2018–2022
- List of members of the Italian Senate, 2022–
