= Luciano Nobili (politician) =

Italian politician (born 1977)

Member of the Regional Council of Lazio
- Incumbent
- Assumed office 3 March 2023

Member of the Chamber of Deputies
- In office 23 March 2018 – 12 October 2022
- Constituency: Lazio 1 – P01

Personal details
- Born: 23 September 1977 (age 48)
- Party: Italia Viva (since 2019)

Luciano Nobili (born 23 September 1977) is an Italian politician serving as a member of the Regional Council of Lazio since 2023. From 2018 to 2022, he was a member of the Chamber of Deputies.
