= Enrico Letta =

Italian politician (born 1966)

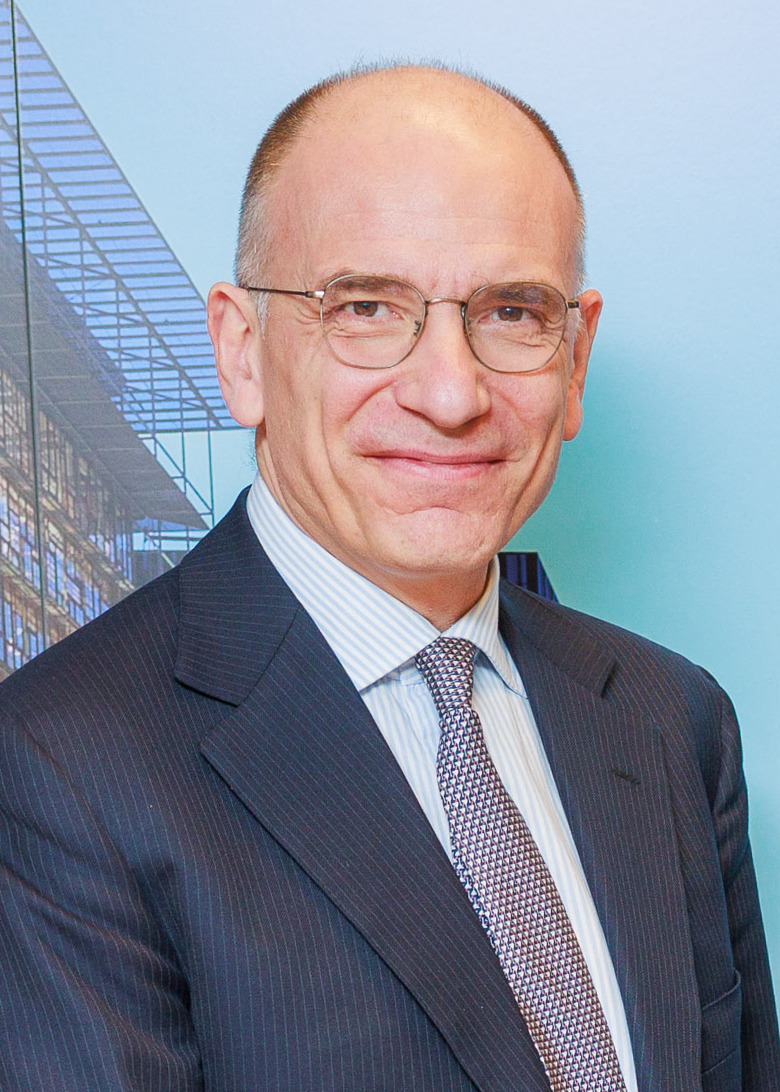
- Letta in 2024

Prime Minister of Italy
- In office 28 April 2013 – 22 February 2014
- President: Giorgio Napolitano
- Deputy: Angelino Alfano
- Preceded by: Mario Monti
- Succeeded by: Matteo Renzi

Secretary of the Democratic Party
- In office 14 March 2021 – 12 March 2023
- Deputy: Irene Tinagli; Peppe Provenzano
- Preceded by: Nicola Zingaretti
- Succeeded by: Elly Schlein

Deputy Secretary of the Democratic Party
- In office 7 November 2009 – 20 April 2013
- Secretary: Pier Luigi Bersani
- Preceded by: Dario Franceschini
- Succeeded by: Debora Serracchiani; Lorenzo Guerini
Ministerial offices
Secretary of the Council of Ministers
In office 17 May 2006 – 8 May 2008
Prime Minister	Romano Prodi
Preceded by	Gianni Letta
Succeeded by	Gianni Letta
Minister of Industry, Commerce and Crafts
In office 22 December 1999 – 11 June 2001
Prime Minister	Massimo D'Alema; Giuliano Amato
Preceded by	Pier Luigi Bersani
Succeeded by	Antonio Marzano
Minister for the Community Policies
In office 21 October 1998 – 22 December 1999
Prime Minister	Massimo D'Alema
Preceded by	Lamberto Dini
Succeeded by	Patrizia Toia
Parliamentary offices
Member of the Chamber of Deputies
In office 6 October 2021 – 20 December 2024
Constituency	Lombardy (2022–2024); Siena (2021–2022)
In office 30 May 2001 – 23 July 2015
Constituency	Marche (2013–2015); Lombardy II (2008–2013); Lombardy I (2006–2008); Piedmont I (2001–2004)
Member of the European Parliament
In office 14 June 2004 – 10 April 2006
Constituency	North-East Italy

Personal details
- Born: 20 August 1966 (age 60) Pisa, Tuscany, Italy
- Party: PD (2007–2015; since 2019)
- Other political affiliations: DC (before 1994); PPI (1994–2002); DL (2002–2007)
- Height: 1.87 m (6 ft 2 in)
- Spouse: Gianna Fregonara
- Children: 3
- Education: University of Pisa; Sant'Anna School of Advanced Studies
- Profession: Politician; professor
- Website: enricoletta.it
- Letta's voice Portion of Letta's speech at the 2013 Rimini Meeting; Recorded 21 August 2013

Enrico Letta (Italian: [enˈriːko ˈlɛtta]; born 20 August 1966) is an Italian politician who served as Prime Minister of Italy from April 2013 to February 2014, leading a grand coalition of centre-left and centre-right parties. He later was the leader of the Democratic Party (PD) from March 2021 to March 2023.

After working as an academic, Letta entered politics in 1998 when he was appointed to the Cabinet as Minister for the Community Policies, a role he held until 1999 when he was promoted to become Minister of Industry, Commerce, and Crafts. In 2001, he left the Cabinet upon his election to the Chamber of Deputies. From 2006 to 2008, he was appointed Secretary of the Council of Ministers. In 2007, Letta was one of the senior founding members of the Democratic Party, and in 2009 was elected as its Deputy Secretary.

After the 2013 Italian general election produced an inconclusive result, and following negotiations between party leaders, President Giorgio Napolitano gave him the task of forming a national unity government (Letta Cabinet), composed of Letta's PD, the centre-right The People of Freedom (PdL), and the centrist Civic Choice, in order to mitigate the economic and social crises engulfing Italy as a result of the Great Recession. Following an agreement between parties, Letta resigned as PD Deputy Secretary and was appointed Prime Minister of Italy on 28 April 2013. His government tried to promote economic recovery by securing a funding deal from the European Union to alleviate youth unemployment and abolished the party subsidies, something seen as a watershed moment for Italian politics, which for years had depended upon public funds. Letta also faced the early stages of the 2015 European migrant crisis, including the 2013 Lampedusa migrant shipwreck, the deadliest shipwreck in the recent history of the Mediterranean Sea; in response, Letta implemented Operation Mare Nostrum to patrol the maritime borders and rescue migrants.

In November 2013, PdL leader Silvio Berlusconi attempted to withdraw his party's support from the government in order to bring about a change of prime minister; in response, all of the cabinet's centre-right ministers chose to leave the PdL and formed a new party, saying they wished to continue supporting Letta. Despite securing his position, the election in December 2013 of Matteo Renzi as PD secretary brought significant leadership tensions within the PD to public view. After several weeks of denying that he would seek a change, Renzi publicly challenged Letta for the position of prime minister on 13 February 2014. Letta quickly lost the support of his colleagues and resigned as prime minister on 22 February.

Following his resignation, Letta initially retired from politics, leaving Italy to accept appointment as dean of the School of International Affairs at Sciences Po in Paris. In March 2021, the PD secretary Nicola Zingaretti resigned after growing tensions within the party. Many prominent members of the party asked Letta to become the new leader; after a few days, Letta announced that he would return to Italy to accept the candidacy, and he was elected as new secretary by the national assembly on 14 March 2021. On 4 October 2021, Letta was elected to the Chamber of Deputies for the Siena constituency. He resigned on 20 December 2024. to become Dean of IE University’s School of Politics, Economics and Global Affairs in Madrid, Spain.

== Early life and education ==
Letta was born in Pisa, Tuscany, to Giorgio Letta, an Abruzzo-born professor of mathematics who taught probability theory at the University of Pisa, member of the Lincean Academy and of the National Academy of the Sciences, and Anna Banchi, born in Sassari and raised in Porto Torres of Tuscan and Sardinian origins. Born into a numerous family, uncles on his father's side include the centre-right politician Gianni Letta, a close advisor of Silvio Berlusconi, and the archaeologist Cesare Letta, while one of his paternal aunts, Maria Teresa Letta, served as vice president of the Italian Red Cross; a maternal great-uncle is the poet and playwright Gian Paolo Bazzoni.

After spending part of his childhood in Strasbourg, Letta completed his schooling in Italy at the liceo classico Galileo Galilei in Pisa. He has a degree in political science, which he received from the University of Pisa and subsequently obtained a PhD at the Sant'Anna School of Advanced Studies, a Graduate School with university status. (Note: It is not altogether clear whether the Doctorate degree was obtained in international law in 1997 as reported in his curriculum vitae, or in political science in 1999 as reported by ANSA.)

From 2001 to 2003, Letta was professor at the University Carlo Cattaneo near Varese, and then he taught at the Sant'Anna School in Pisa in 2003 and at the HEC Paris in 2004.

== Political career ==
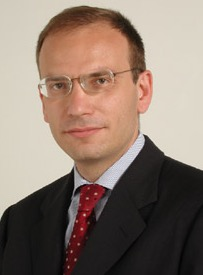
Letta in 2001

Letta, a Catholic, began his political career in the Christian Democracy (DC), the dominant centrist and Roman Catholic party, which ruled Italy for almost fifty years. From 1991 to 1995, Letta was president of the Youth of the European People's Party, the official youth wing of the European People's Party, a European political party founded by national-level Christian democratic parties, including the Italian DC; he used his presidency to help strengthen long-term connections among a variety of centrist parties in Europe, and has since remained a convinced supporter of the European Union and European integration.

During the Ciampi Cabinet headed by Carlo Azeglio Ciampi in 1993 and 1994, Letta worked as chief of staff for the minister of foreign affairs, Beniamino Andreatta; Andreatta, a left-leaning Christian Democrat economist with whom Letta had already been collaborating in a think tank known as Agenzia di Ricerche e Legislazione (AREL), played a highly influential role in Letta's political career.

Following the collapse of the DC in 1994, Letta joined its immediate successor, the Italian People's Party (PPI); after serving as secretary general of the Euro Committee within the Ministry of Treasury from 1996 to 1997, he became deputy secretary of the party in 1997 and 1998, when it was fully allied with the centre-left. In 1998, after the fall of Romano Prodi's first government, Letta was appointed Minister for the Community Policies in cabinet of Massimo D'Alema at the age of 32, becoming the youngest cabinet minister in post-war Italy.

In 1999, Letta became Minister of Industry, Commerce and Crafts in the second government of D'Alema; a position that he held until 2001, serving also in the cabinet of Giuliano Amato. During Amato's government he held the role of Minister of Foreign Trade too.

In the 2001 Italian general election, Letta was elected to the Chamber of Deputies as a member of Democracy is Freedom – The Daisy, a newly formed centrist formation to which the Italian People's Party had joined. In the following year, he was appointed national responsible for the economic policies of The Daisy.

In 2004, Letta was elected member of the European Parliament, with nearly 179,000 votes, within The Olive Tree list, joining the Alliance of Liberals and Democrats for Europe (ALDE) group. As MEP he became a member of the Committee on Economic and Monetary Affairs. Letta served also in the committee for relations with the Maghreb countries and the Arab Maghreb Union.

In 2006, Letta was re-elected to the Chamber of Deputies and was appointed Secretary of the Council of Ministers in the second government of Romano Prodi, thereby succeeding his uncle Gianni Letta who had held the same position in the outgoing cabinet of Silvio Berlusconi. In this post, he became the closest advisor of Prime Minister Prodi, becoming one of the most influential politicians within the government. However, Prodi's government fell after only two years following tensions within its majority caused by the resignation of the Minister of Justice, Clemente Mastella. Following the 2008 Italian general election, which saw a victory of the centre-right, Letta returned the post to his uncle, when the Berlusconi IV Cabinet was sworn in.

=== Leadership election candidacy ===
In 2007, together with other The Daisy's members, Letta joined the Democratic Party (PD), the new centre-left party, born from the union between The Daisy and the Democrats of the Left. Having been a founding member of the party, Letta run in the first leadership election, which was held as an open primary. He announced his candidacy in July 2007 through a YouTube video. A few weeks after the announcement, he compared the PD to Wikipedia, stating: "As in Wikipedia, even in the PD each of the hundreds of thousands of members must bring their own contributions, their own skills, which in certain fields are certainly more important than mine and those of the other leaders of the centre-left." In support of his candidacy, Letta founded the 360 Association, a centrist and Christian leftist group, mainly composed by former members of The Daisy.

Letta's candidacy was supported by prominent members of the Italian centre-left, like Francesco Cossiga, Paolo De Castro, Gianni Pittella, Vito De Filippo and many other former members of The Daisy. Moreover, Letta's faction was composed by politicians considered close to Prime Minister Romano Prodi, a Christian leftist professor and founding father of the Italian centre-left. However, Letta had to face the politician who, more than any other, had worked to the formation of the Democratic Party and who was unanimously considered the future leader of the centre-left, Walter Veltroni, the incumbent Mayor of Rome. In the primary election, Veltroni won by a landslide with 75.8% of votes, followed by the former Minister of Health Rosy Bindi with 12.9% and Letta with 11.0%.

After the primary election, Veltroni appointed Letta as the national responsible for labour. In May 2008, after the defeat in the 2008 election, Letta was appointed Shadow Minister of Labour and Social Policies in the second and last Shadow Cabinet formed in Italy.

=== Deputy Secretary of the Democratic Party ===
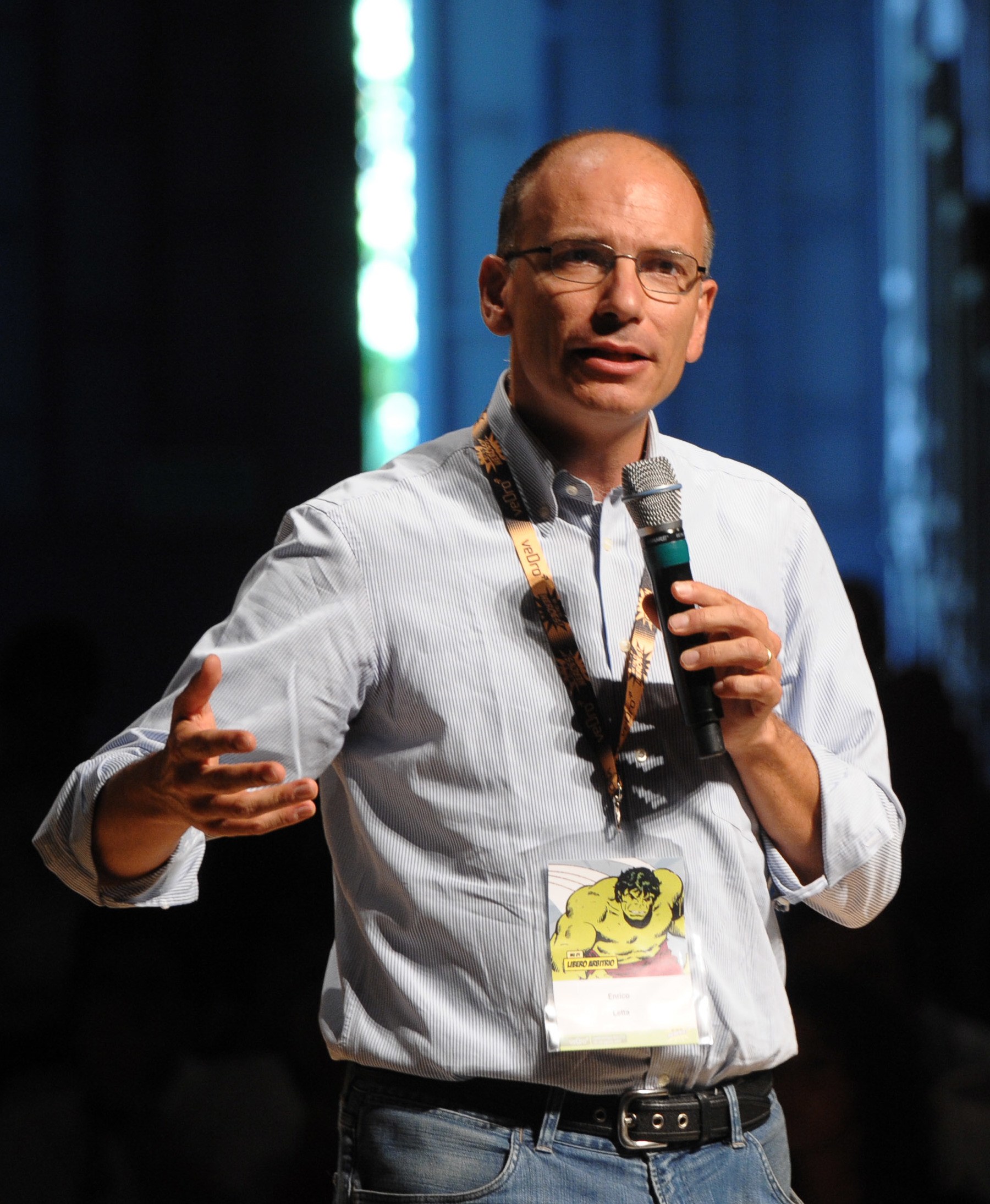
Letta during a convention of his 360 Association in 2012

During the leadership election of 2009, Letta supported the eventual winner, the social-democrat Pier Luigi Bersani, being appointed Deputy Secretary by the party's national convention.

In June 2010, Letta organized a three-day meeting in Verona, during which he met, within its association, entrepreneurs and key leaders of Lega Nord, the largest party in Veneto and eastern Lombardy. An opinion poll among northern Democrats, released during the "Nord Camp", showed that they were keener on an alliance with Lega Nord than Berlusconi's The People of Freedom. Letta was praised both by Roberto Maroni and Umberto Bossi.

In the 2013 Italian general election, the centre-left alliance Italy Common Good led by Bersani won a clear majority of seats in the Chamber of Deputies, thanks to a majority bonus that has effectively trebled the number of seats assigned to the winning party, while in the popular vote, it narrowly defeated the centre-right alliance of former prime minister Berlusconi. Close behind, the new anti-establishment Five Star Movement of comedian Beppe Grillo became the third-strongest force, clearly ahead of the centrist coalition of outgoing Prime Minister Mario Monti. In the Senate, no political group or party won an outright majority, resulting in a hung parliament.

On 20 April 2013, when Bersani resigned as Secretary after the candidates for President of the Republic Franco Marini and Romano Prodi were defeated in the presidential election, the whole leadership of the PD, including Deputy Secretary Letta, resigned their positions.

== Prime Minister of Italy ==
=== Government formation ===
Following five inconclusive ballots for the 2013 Italian presidential election, incumbent president Giorgio Napolitano accepted to be re-elected at the Quirinal Palace. Eventually, Napolitano reluctantly agreed to serve for another term in order to safeguard the continuity of the country's institutions. Napolitano was easily re-elected on 20 April 2013, receiving 738 of the 1007 possible votes, and was sworn in on 22 April 2013 after a speech when he asked for constitutional and electoral reforms.

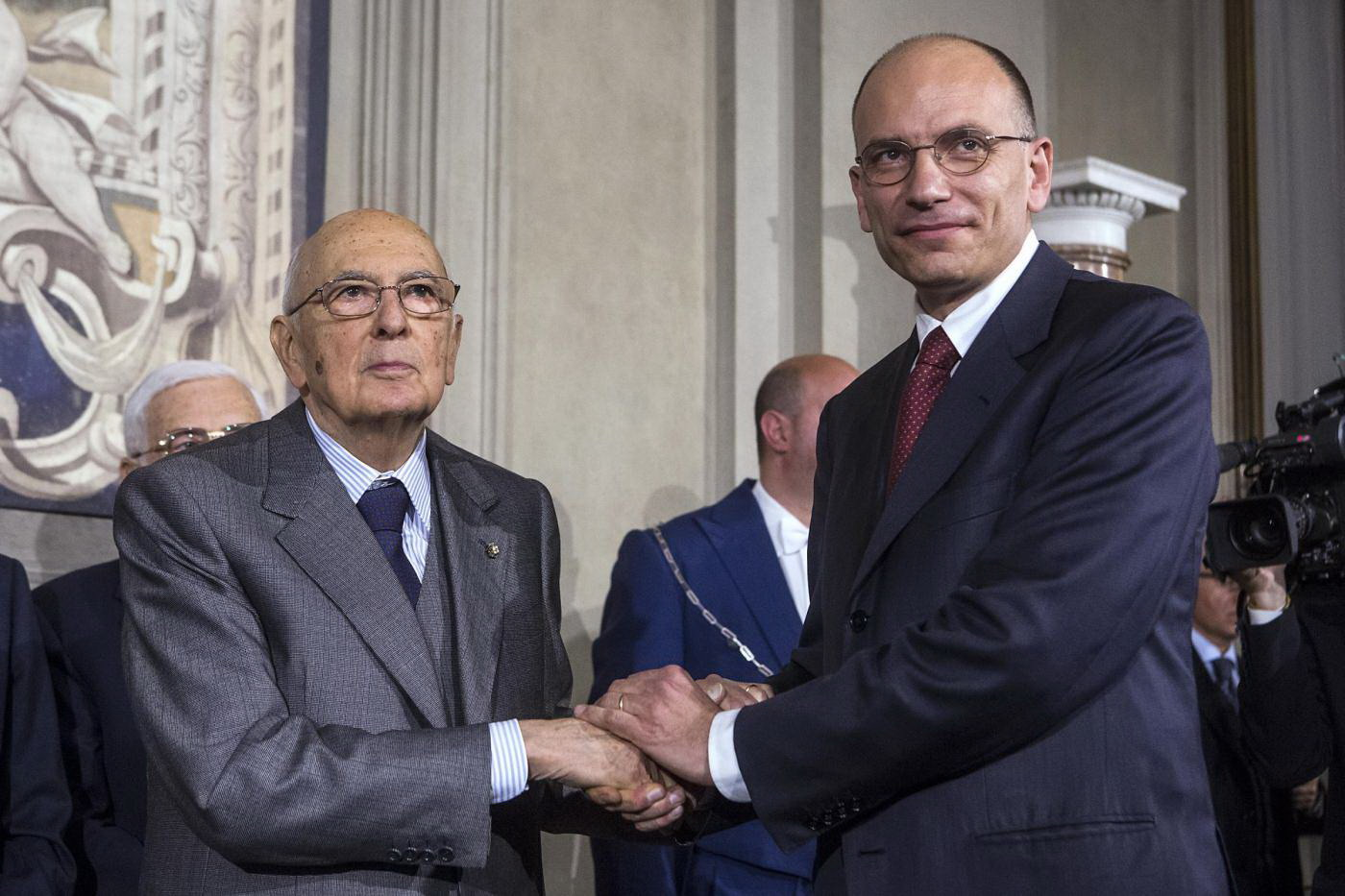
Letta with President Giorgio Napolitano in Rome, 2013

After his re-election, Napolitano immediately began consultations with the chairmen of the Chamber of Deputies, Senate and political forces, after the failure of the previous attempt with Bersani, and the establishment of a panel of experts by the President himself (dubbed as wise men by the press), in order to outline priorities and formulate an agenda to deal with the persistent economic hardship and growing unemployment. On 24 April 2013, Enrico Letta was invited to form a government by President Napolitano, following weeks of political deadlock.

On 27 April, Letta formally accepted the task of leading a grand coalition government, with support from the centre-left Democratic Party, the centre-right People of Freedom (PdL) of Silvio Berlusconi and the centrist Civic Choice of outgoing PM Mario Monti. The government he formed became the first in the history of the Italian Republic to include representatives of all the major coalitions that had run in the latest election. His close relationship with his uncle, Gianni Letta, one of Berlusconi's most trusted advisors, was perceived as a way of overcoming the bitter hostility between the two opposing factions. Letta appointed Angelino Alfano, secretary of the People of Freedom, as his Deputy Prime Minister. The new government was formally sworn-in as on 28 April. During the swearing ceremony, a man fired gunshots outside Chigi Palace and wounded two Carabinieri. The attacker, Luigi Preiti, was stopped and arrested; he declared that he wanted to kill politicians or at least to hit a "symbol of politics" and that he was forced by despair being unemployed and recently divorced.

On 29 April, Letta's government won the confidence vote in the Chamber with 453 votes in favour, 152 against and 17 abstentions. On the following day, he won the confidence vote in Senate too, with 233 votes in favour, 59 against 18 abstentions. In his first speech in front of the Parliament, Letta stressed "necessity to restore decency, sobriety and a sense of honour"; he also advocated for a reduction of politics' costs.

=== Economic policies ===
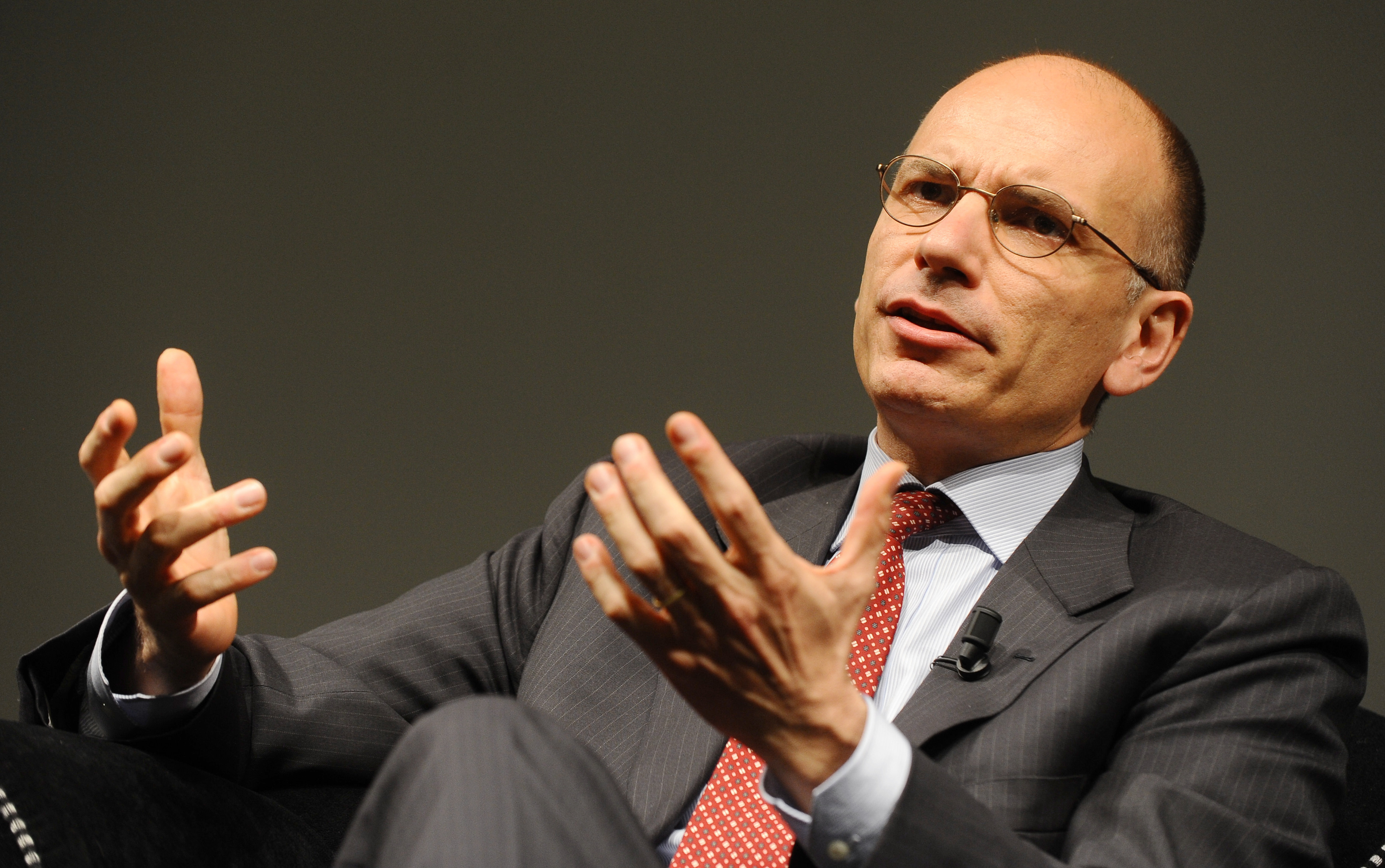
Prime Minister Letta in 2013

During his premiership, Letta had to face a serious socio-economic crisis caused by the Great Recession and the subsequent European debt crisis. In 2013, one of the major problems of the country was the huge youth unemployment, which was valued around 40%. To face this issue, on 14 June 2013, Letta scheduled a summit at Chigi Palace with the ministers of the economy, finance and labour of Italy, Germany, France and Spain, to agree on common EU policies for reducing unemployment. After a few weeks, during a press conference at the conclusion of the Council of the European Union in Brussels, Letta announced that Italy would receive 1.5 billion euros in EU funds to fight youth unemployment.

On 31 May, the Council of Ministers resolved to sponsor a bill to abolish party subsidies, which was widely considered a revolution in Italian politics and political parties, which heavily depended on public funds. On 4 June, Letta, within his Minister of Economic Development, Flavio Zanonato and his Minister of the Environment, Andrea Orlando, announced the receivership of Ilva, one of the largest steel makers in Europe, for a duration of 36 months, appointing Enrico Bondi as receiver.

On 15 June, the government approved the so-called "Action Decree" on hiring policies enabling economic recovery. The decree was later approved by the Parliament between July and August 2013 with a confidence vote. The reform was harshly criticized by the anti-establishment Five Star Movement. On 29 August, the government abolished IMU, the Italian tax on real estate introduced by the technocratic government of Mario Monti, for primary homes and for farm buildings .

=== Immigration policies ===
As a result of the Libyan and Syrian Civil Wars, a major problem faced by Letta upon becoming prime minister in 2013 was the high levels of illegal immigration to Italy.

On 3 October 2013, a boat carrying migrants from Libya to Italy sank off the Italian island of Lampedusa. It was reported that the boat had sailed from Misrata, Libya, but that many of the migrants were originally from Eritrea, Somalia and Ghana. An emergency response involving the Italian Coast Guard resulted in the rescue of 155 survivors. On 12 October it was reported that the confirmed death toll after searching the boat was 359, but that further bodies were still missing; a figure of "more than 360" deaths was later reported, becoming the deadliest shipwreck occurred in the Mediterranean Sea.

After the Lampedusa tragedy, Prime Minister Letta decided to strengthen the national patrolling of Sicilian channel by authorizing Operation Mare Nostrum, a military and humanitarian operation whose purpose was to patrol the maritime border and provide relief to migrants. This operation had two main purposes: to safeguard life at sea and to combat the illegal smuggling of migrants. The operation brought at least 150,000 migrants to Europe, mainly from Africa and the Middle East. The operation ended a few months after the end of his premiership, on 31 October 2014.

=== Foreign policies ===
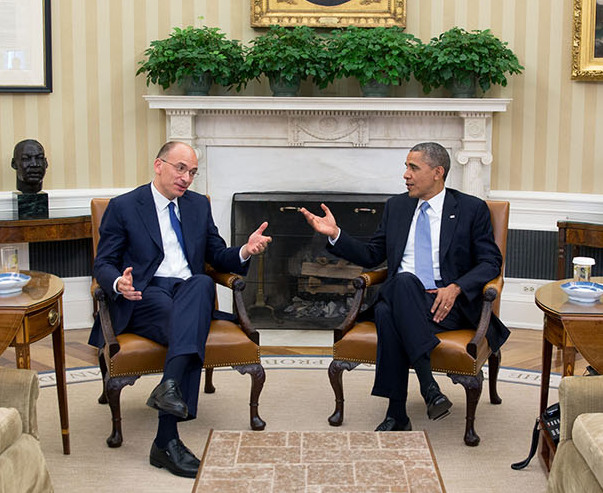
Letta with the U.S. President Barack Obama in the Oval Office

A strong pro-Europeanist politician, Letta built up close relations with other prominent European leaders like Angela Merkel, who was the first foreign leader he met, just a few days after his sworn in, on 30 April. Letta also built a warm relationship with the French President François Hollande, with whom he shared a common view on austerity policies, considered outdated to face the economic crisis; Letta and Hollande often stressed the necessity to increase the public expenditures in investments.

On 17 and 18 June, Letta participated in his first G8 summit at Lough Erne in Northern Ireland. During the summit, Letta had his first bilateral meeting with the President of the United States, Barack Obama. On 17 October, Letta was invited to the White House by President Obama, who stated that he had been really impressed by the Italian Prime Minister and his reforms plan.

On 5 and 6 September, Letta took part in the G20 summit in Saint Petersburg. The summit was focused on the aftermath of the Syrian civil war. Letta advocated for a diplomatic resolution of the crisis promoted by the United Nations. On 25 September, during his speech in front of the United Nations General Assembly, Letta asked a deep reform of the UN Security Council.

=== September 2013 government crisis ===
On 28 September 2013, five ministers of The People of Freedom resigned on the orders of their leader, Silvio Berlusconi, pointing to the decision to postpone the decree that prevented the increase of the VAT from 21 to 22%, thus opening a government crisis. On the following day, Letta had a meeting with President Napolitano to discuss the possible alternatives to solve the crisis. The head of State stressed that he would dissolve parliament only if there were no other possible alternatives.

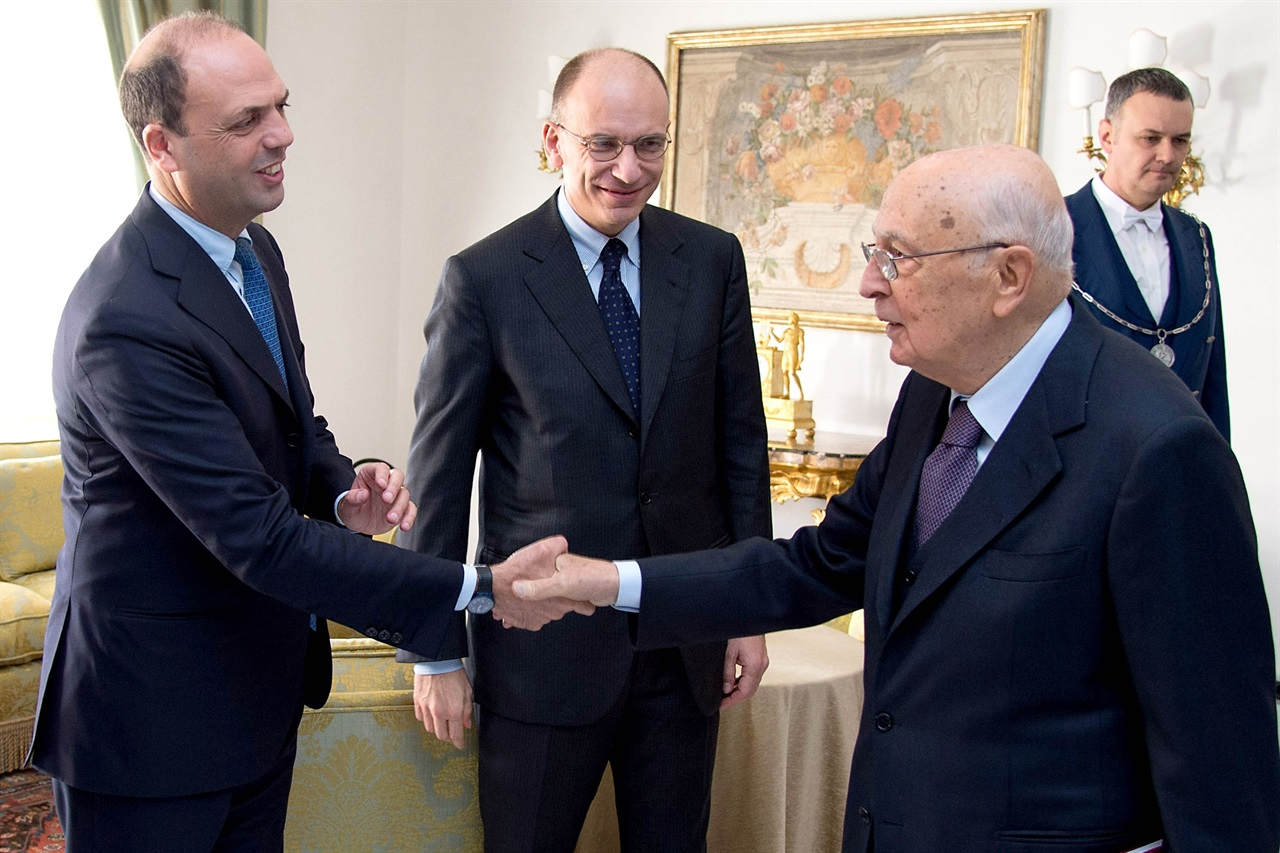
Letta with Angelino Alfano and Giorgio Napolitano in December 2013

In the following days, dozens of members of PdL prepared to defy Berlusconi and vote in favour of the government, prompting him to announce that he would back the Prime Minister. On 2 October, the government received 235 votes in favor and 70 against in the Senate, and 435 in favor and 162 against in the Chamber of Deputies. Letta could thus continue his grand coalition government.

On 23 November, the Senate had to vote about the expulsion of Berlusconi from the Parliament, due to a conviction of tax fraud by the court of final instance and the Court of Cassation, which occurred a few months before. Because he had been sentenced to a gross imprisonment for more than two years, the Senate voted to expel him from the Parliament, barring him from serving in any legislative office for six years.

After his expulsion from the Parliament, Berlusconi, who disbanded the PdL a few days before re-founding Forza Italia party, withdrew his support to the government. However, the interior minister Angelino Alfano did not follow his former leader, founding, along with other ministers and many members of the parliament, the New Centre-Right party, remaining in government. The government later won key confidence votes in December 2013, with 173 votes in favour in the Senate and 350 in the Chamber.

On 26 January 2014, the Minister of Agriculture, Nunzia De Girolamo, resigned from her post due to claims of improper conduct linked to a scandal in the local healthcare system of her hometown, Benevento. Her resignation was accepted by Letta on the following day, who took the ministerial role ad interim.

=== Resignation ===
On 8 December 2013, the Mayor of Florence, Matteo Renzi, won the Democratic Party leadership election by a landslide, immediately starting rumours about the possibility of becoming the new prime minister. On 17 January 2014, while on air at Le invasioni barbariche on La7 TV channel, interviewed about tensions between him and Prime Minister Letta, Renzi tweeted the hashtag #enricostaisereno ("Enrico don't worry") to reassure his party colleague that he was not plotting anything against him.

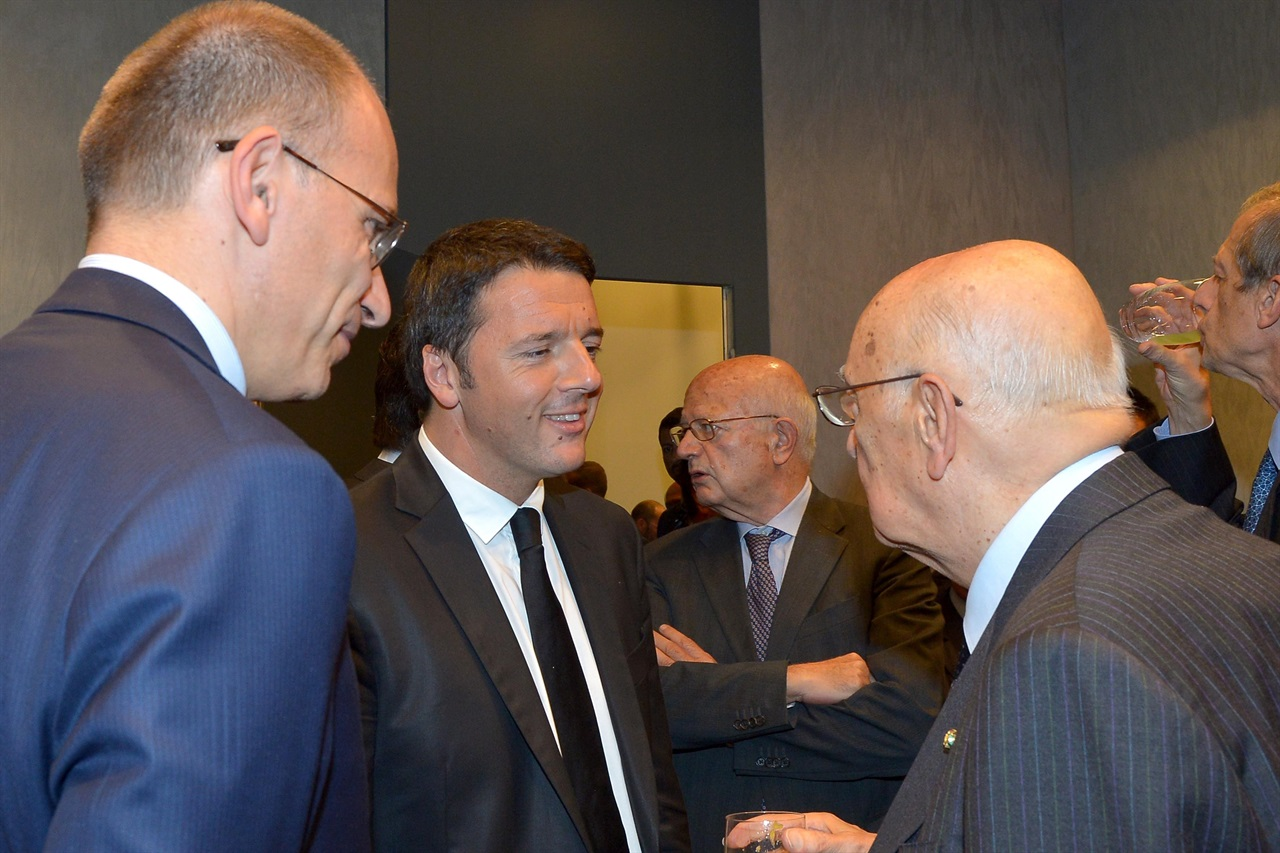
Letta with Matteo Renzi and President Napolitano in October 2013

The growing criticism of the slow pace of Italian economic reform left Letta increasingly isolated within his own party. At a PD's meeting on 13 February 2014, the Democratic Party leadership voted heavily in favour of Renzi's motion for "a new government, a new phase and a radical programme of reforms". Minutes after the party backed Renzi's proposal by 136 votes to 16, with two abstentions, Letta went to the Quirinal Palace, for a bilateral meeting with President Napolitano.

In an earlier speech, Renzi had paid tribute to Letta, saying that he did not intend to put him "on trial". But, without directly proposing himself as the next prime minister, he said the Eurozone's third-largest economy urgently needed "a new phase" and "radical programme" to push through badly needed reforms. The motion he put forward made clear "the necessity and urgency of opening a new phase with a new executive". Speaking privately to party leaders, Renzi said that Italy was "at a crossroads" and faced either holding fresh elections or a new government without a return to the polls.

On 14 February, Letta resigned from the office of prime minister. Following Letta's resignation, Renzi received the task of forming a new government from President Napolitano on 17 February, and was formally sworn in as prime minister on 22 February.

== Academic career ==
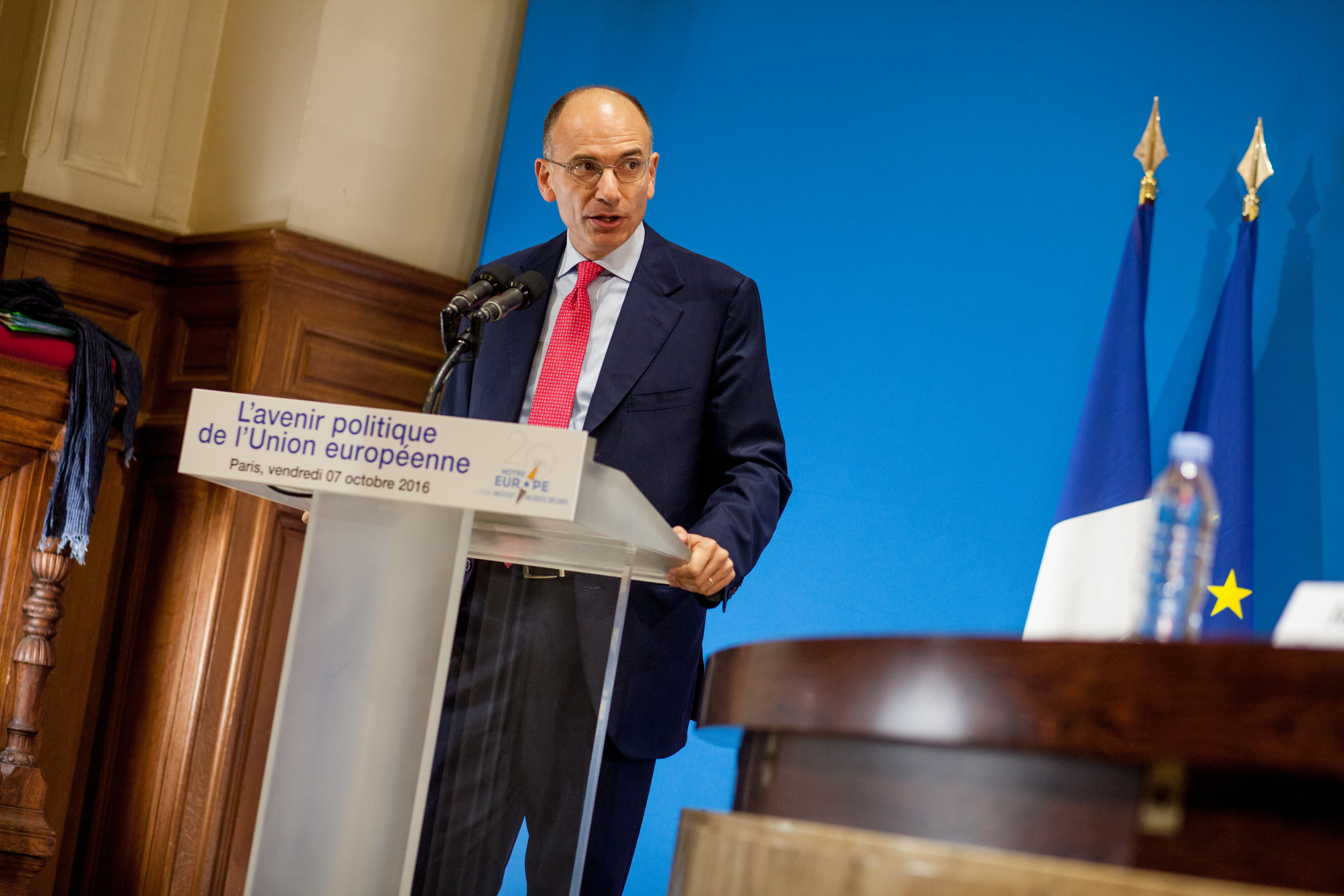
Letta speaking at the Jacques Delors Institute in 2016

In 2015, Letta resigned as a member of the Chamber of Deputies, after having voted against the new electoral law proposed by Prime Minister Renzi; at the same time, he announced that he would not renew the PD's membership.

In April 2015, Letta moved to Paris to teach at the Sciences Po, a higher education institute of political science. Since 1 September, he became dean of the Paris School of International Affairs (PSIA) of the same institute. Along with his commitment to Sciences Po, he also had teaching periods at the University of Technology Sydney and the School of Global Policy and Strategy at the University of California, San Diego. In the same year, Letta launched Scuola di Politiche (School of Politics), a course of political science for young Italians.

In 2016, Letta supported the constitutional reform proposed by Renzi to reduce the powers of the Senate. In the same year, along with the Jacques Delors Institute, he launched a school of political science focused on European issues, known as Académie Notre Europe. In October 2017, he joined the new Comitè Action Publique 2022, a public commission for the reform of state and public administration in France which was strongly supported by President Emmanuel Macron.

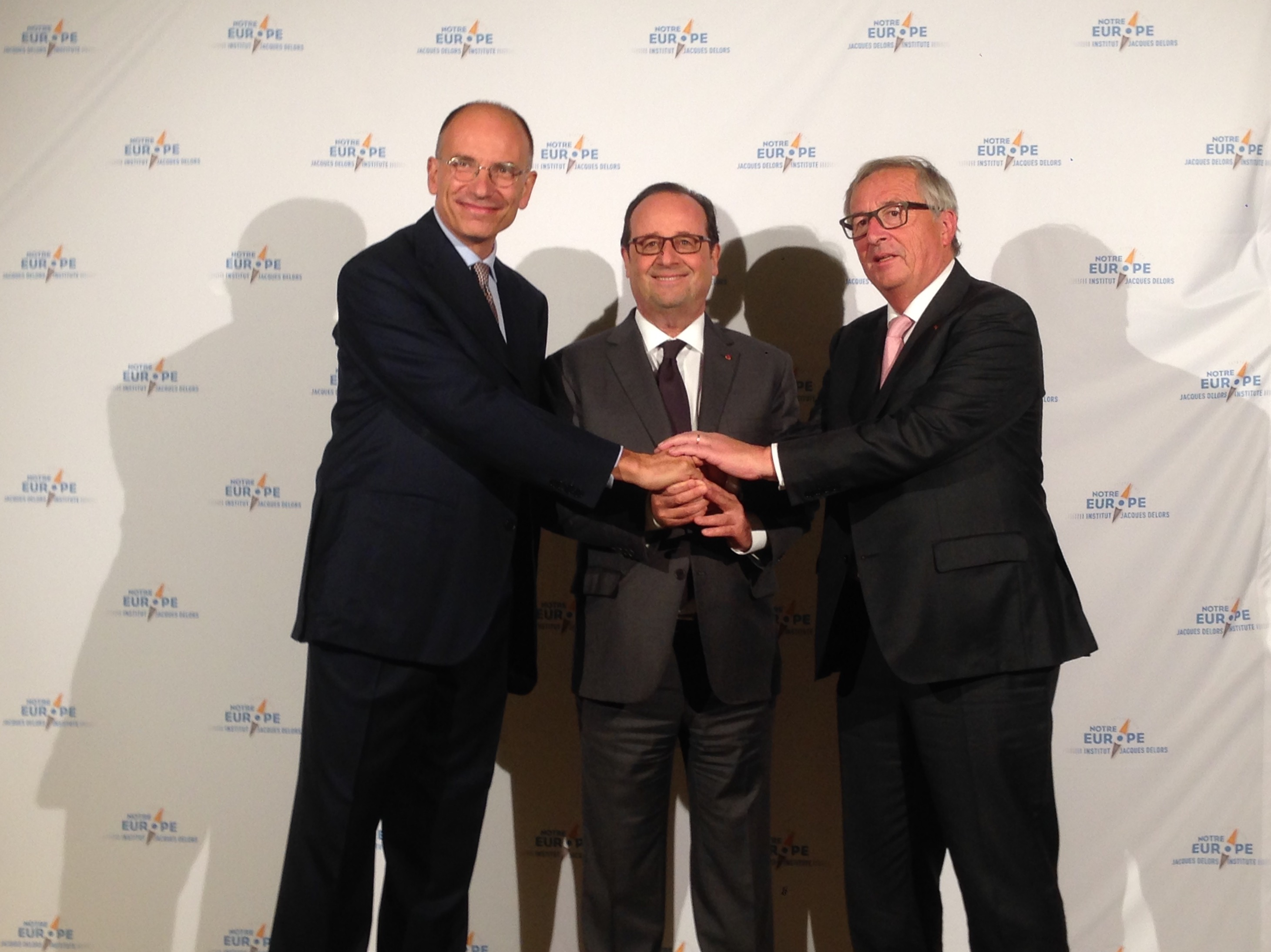
Letta with François Hollande and Jean-Claude Juncker in 2016

In March 2019, following the victory of Nicola Zingaretti in the PD leadership election, Letta announced that he would re-join the party after four years. In the same year, Letta also served on the advisory board of the annual Human Development Report of the United Nations Development Programme (UNDP), co-chaired by Thomas Piketty and Tharman Shanmugaratnam. In 2020, he spoke in favour of the constitutional reform to reduce the number of MPs, considering it the first step to overcome perfect bicameralism.

Following his retirement from politics, Letta became advisor of many corporations and international organizations like Abertis, where he became member of the Board of Directors in 2016, Amundi, in which he served as member of the Global Advisory Board since 2016, the Eurasia Group, of which he has been Senior Advisor since 2016, Publicis, where he served within the International Advisory Board since 2019 and Tikehau Capital, of which he became member of the International Advisory Board.

Letta is a member of many no-profit organizations like the International Gender Champions (IGC), the British Council, Re-Imagine Europa, the Trilateral Commission, in which he presided the European Group, the Aspen Institute Italia, in which he served in the Executive Committee, Associazione Italia ASEAN, of which he became chairman and the Institut de Prospective Economique du Monde Méditerranéen (IPEMED).

Letta was appointed Dean of IE School of Politics, Economics and Global Affairs. Letta will replace Manuel Muñiz, the current Provost of IE University and Charmain of the Board of IE New York College. He will join IE University on November 20.

In April 2024, Letta authored a report suggesting the introduction of a 28th regime, a regulatory regime which could be used by all European companies in lieu of national regimes.

== Secretary of the Democratic Party ==
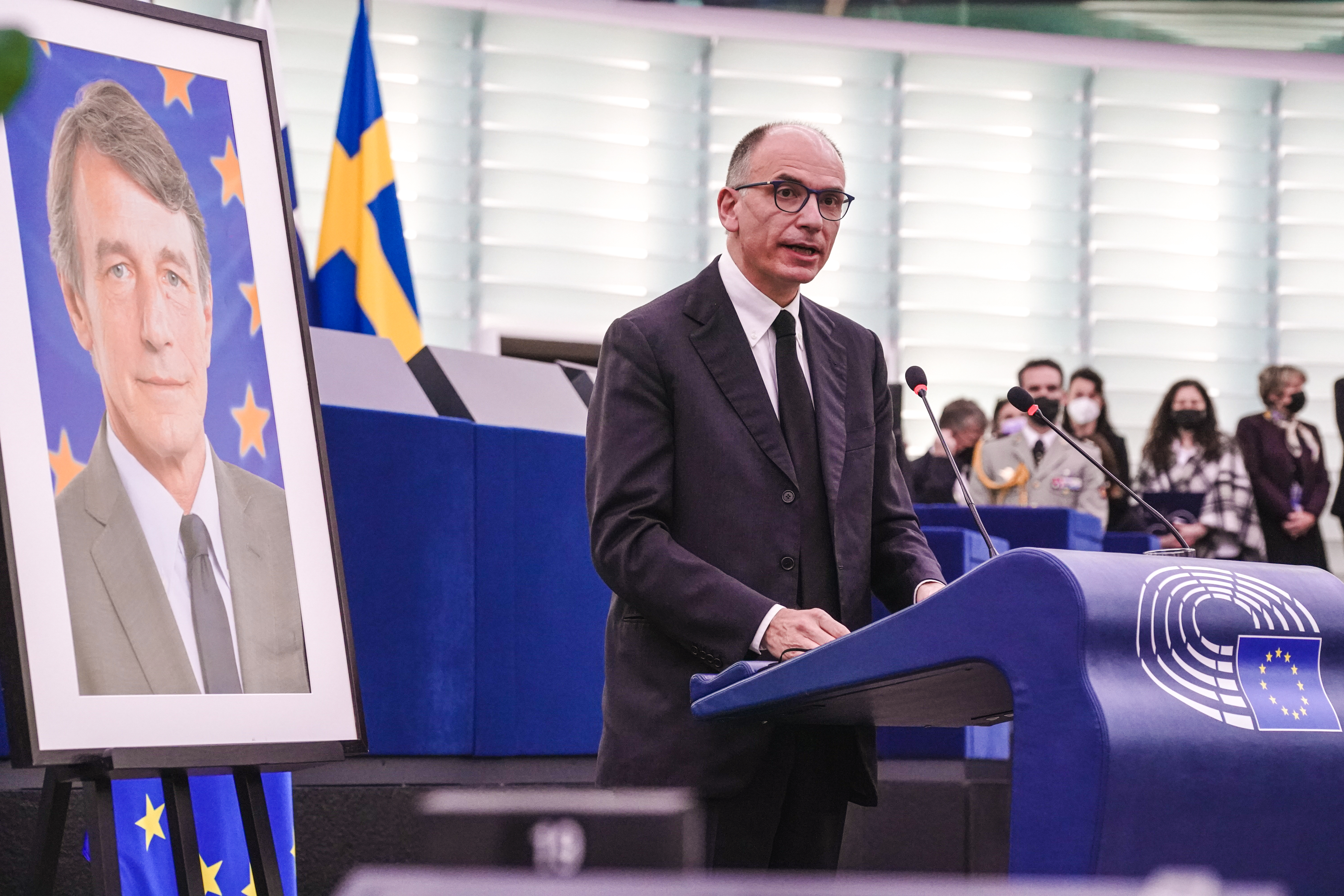
Letta speaking at the European Parliament during the memorial for David Sassoli, in January 2022

In January 2021, after the government crisis which forced Prime Minister Giuseppe Conte to resign, a national unity government led by Mario Draghi was formed. In the midst of the formation of Draghi's government, Zingaretti was heavily criticized by the party's minority for his management of the crisis and strenuous support to Conte. On 4 March, after weeks of internal turmoil, Zingaretti announced his resignation as secretary, stating that he was "ashamed of the power struggles" within the party.

In the next days, many prominent members of the PD, including Zingaretti himself, but also former prime minister Paolo Gentiloni, former party secretary Dario Franceschini and President of Emilia-Romagna Stefano Bonaccini, publicly asked former Letta to become the new leader of the party. Following an initial reluctance, Letta stated that he needed a few days to evaluate the option. On 12 March, he officially accepted his candidacy as new party's leader. On 14 March, the national assembly of the PD elected Letta secretary with 860 votes in favour, 2 against and 4 abstentions.

On 17 March, Letta appointed Peppe Provenzano and Irene Tinagli as his deputy secretaries. On the following day, he appointed the party's new executive, composed of eight men and eight women. Later that month, Letta forced the two Democratic leaders in Parliament, Graziano Delrio and Andrea Marcucci, to resign and proposed the election of two female leaders. On 25 and 30 March, senators and deputies elected Simona Malpezzi and Debora Serracchiani as their leaders in the Senate and in the Chamber.

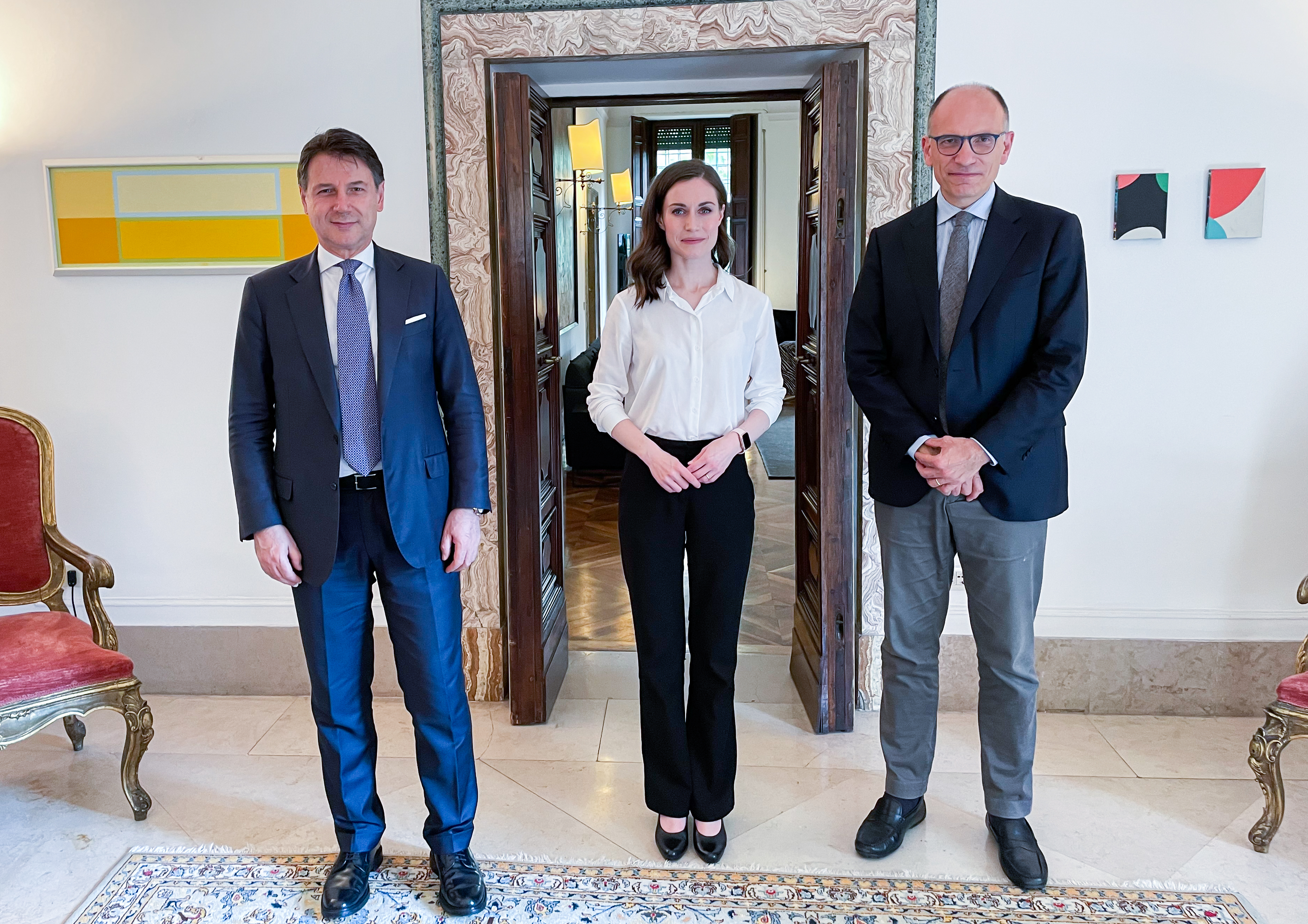
Letta with Giuseppe Conte and the Finnish PM Sanna Marin in 2022

In July 2021, Letta announced his intention to run for the Chamber of Deputies in the Siena constituency, which remained vacant after the resignation of Pier Carlo Padoan. On 4 October, Letta won the by-election with 49.9% of votes, returning to the Parliament after six years. In the concurrent local elections, the PD and its allies won municipal elections in Milan, Bologna, Naples, Rome, Turin and many other major cities across the country.

As leader of the third political force in the parliament, Letta played an important role in the re-election of incumbent president Sergio Mattarella. On 23 January 2022, during Fabio Fazio's talk show Che tempo che fa, Letta stated that his favourable candidates for the presidency were Mario Draghi and Sergio Mattarella. On the morning of 29 January, after the fall of all other possible candidacies, Letta asked the other leaders to follow "the Parliament's wisdom", referring to the massive support that Mattarella had received in the previous ballots. On the same day, all the main parties asked Mattarella to serve for a second term. Despite his initial firm denial, Mattarella accepted the nomination and was re-elected with 759 votes.

In July 2022, tensions arose within the governing majority, especially between Giuseppe Conte, leader of the Five Star Movement, and Prime Minister Draghi. Letta, who was trying to form a broad centre-left coalition with the M5S in the following election, was particularly critical of the possibility of a government crisis. On 13 July, Conte announced that the M5S would revoke its support to the national unity government regarding the so-called decreto aiuti (English: aid decree), concerning economic stimulus to contrast the ongoing energy crisis, opening a political crisis within the majority. On the following day, the M5S abstained and Prime Minister Draghi, despite having won the confidence vote, resigned. However, the resignation was rejected by President Mattarella. On the same day, Letta stressed that a government crisis needed to be officially opened in the Parliament, adding that "Italy deserved to stand with a strong personality like that of PM Draghi and the team that was around him." However, on 21 July, Draghi resigned again after a new confidence vote in the Senate failed to pass with an absolute majority, following the defections of M5S, Lega, and Forza Italia; A snap election was called for 25 September 2022.

After the 2022 general election, Enrico Letta conceded defeat and announced that he would not stand at the congress to elect the new party secretary. He was succeeded by Elly Schlein, following the election on 26 February 2023.

== Personal life ==
Letta is married to Gianna Fregonara, an Italian journalist, with whom he had three children, Giacomo, Lorenzo and Francesco.

Letta is known to be fond of listening to Dire Straits and playing Subbuteo; he is also an avid supporter of A.C. Milan. In addition to his native Italian, Letta speaks French, English, and Spanish fluently.

== Electoral history ==
Election	House	Constituency	Party	Votes	Result
2001	Chamber of Deputies	Piedmont 1	DL	– (Note: Elected in a closed list proportional representation system.)	Elected
2004	European Parliament	North-East Italy	Ulivo	178,707	Elected
2006	Chamber of Deputies	Lombardy 1	Ulivo	–	Elected
2008	Chamber of Deputies	Lombardy 2	PD	–	Elected
2013	Chamber of Deputies	Marche	PD	–	Elected
2021	Chamber of Deputies	Siena	PD	33,391	Elected
2022	Chamber of Deputies	Lombardy 1	PD	–	Elected

=== First-past-the-post elections ===
2021 Italian by-election (C): Siena
Candidate	Party	Votes	%
Enrico Letta	Centre-left coalition	33,391	49.9
Tommaso Marrocchesi Marzi	Centre-right coalition	25,303	37.8
Others		8,191	12.3
Total		66,885	100.0

Political offices
Preceded by Lamberto Dini	Minister for the Community Policies; 1998–1999	Succeeded by Patrizia Toia
Preceded by Pier Luigi Bersani	Minister of Industry, Commerce and Crafts; 1999–2001	Succeeded by Antonio Marzano as Minister of Productive Activities
Preceded by Gianni Letta	Secretary of the Council of Ministers; 2006–2008	Succeeded by Gianni Letta
Preceded by Mario Monti	Prime Minister of Italy; 2013–2014	Succeeded by Matteo Renzi
Party political offices
Preceded by Dario Franceschini	Deputy Secretary of the Democratic Party; 2009–2013	Succeeded by Debora Serracchiani
Preceded by Dario Franceschini	Deputy Secretary of the Democratic Party; 2009–2013	Succeeded by Lorenzo Guerini
Preceded by Nicola Zingaretti	Secretary of the Democratic Party; 2021–2023	Succeeded by Elly Schlein
