= Emanuela Del Re =

Italian politician (born 1963)

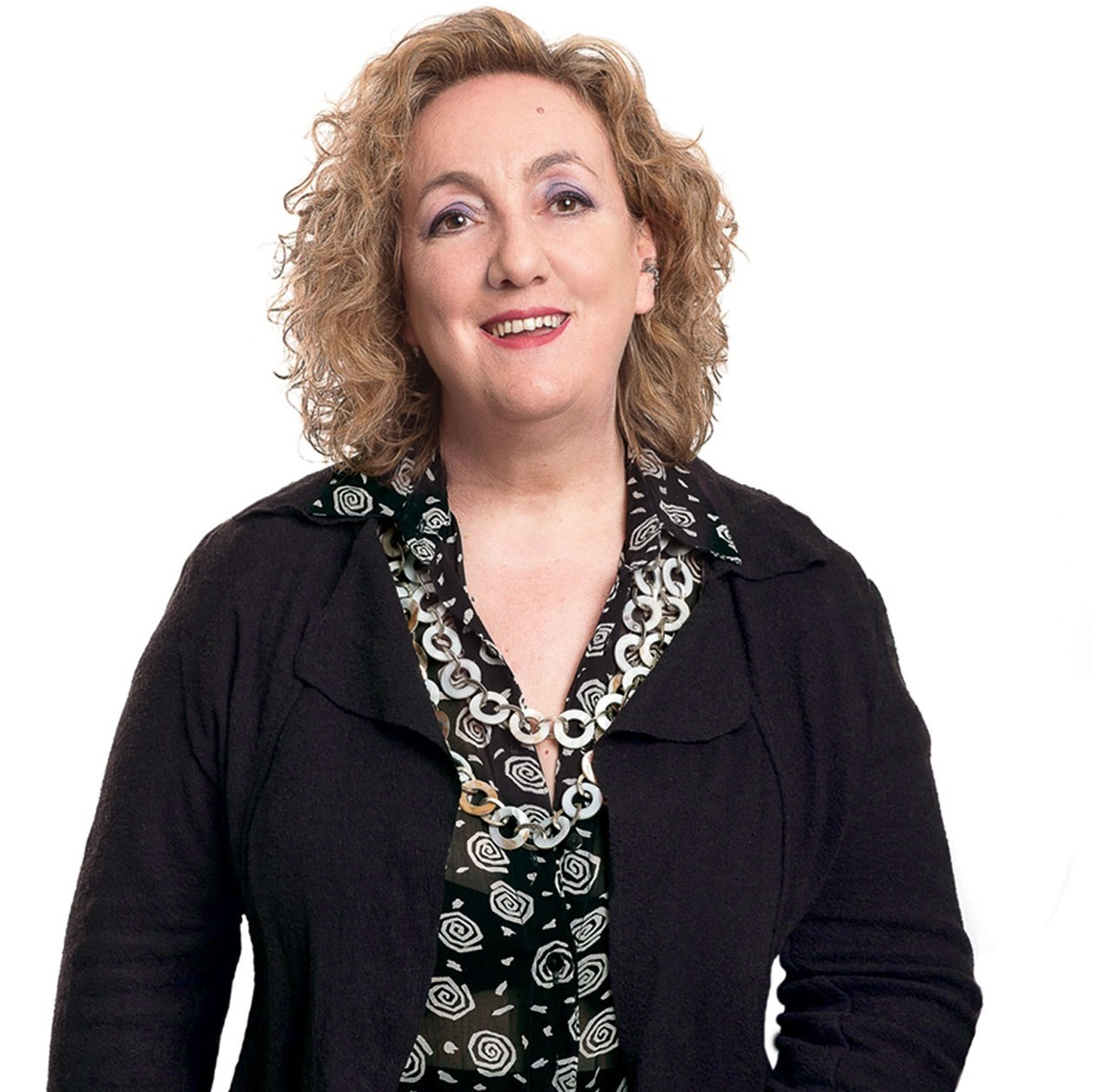

European Union Special Representative for Sahel
- In office 3 June 2021 – 1 December 2024
- Preceded by: Ángel Losada Fernández
- Succeeded by: João Gomes Cravinho

Deputy Minister of Foreign Affairs
- In office 13 June 2018 – 13 February 2021 Serving with Marina Sereni
- Preceded by: Mario Giro

Member of the Chamber of Deputies
- In office 23 March 2018 – 3 June 2021
- Succeeded by: Andrea Casu
- Constituency: Rome–Primavalle

Personal details
- Born: Emanuela Claudia Del Re; 6 December 1963 (age 62) Rome, Italy
- Party: Five Star Movement
- Education: Sapienza University of Rome
- Profession: Sociologist

Emanuela Claudia Del Re (born 6 December 1963) is an Italian politician and sociologist who has been serving as European Union Special Representative (EUSR) for the Sahel since 2021. From 2018 to 2021, she was a member of the Chamber of Deputies, serving as Deputy Minister of Foreign Affairs in the government of Prime Minister Giuseppe Conte.

A sociologist and expert in international politics, Del Re is a specialist in migration and refugees, conflicts, religious issues, minorities. Since 1990 she has conducted intense field research - supported by prestigious institutions - in conflict areas, in particular the Balkans, the Caucasus, Africa and the Middle East, where she has witnessed social and political crises and the voice of populations, especially of the victims. She is an Associate Professor (SPS / 07) and a confirmed Researcher (SPS / 11).

== Early career ==
Earlier in her career, Del Re was a researcher and professor of Sociology of political phenomena at the International telematic university "UniNettuno", she taught for years at the Faculty of Communication Sciences of the "La Sapienza" University of Rome, where she was also "Jean Monnet" Professor with a teaching funded by the European Commission on European citizenship and governance. From 1997 to 2000 she was a researcher at the European University Institute and research fellow at "La Sapienza" University of Rome (2001–2003). She also taught a class in “decision-making” at Link Campus University.

In 2017 Del Re was elected National Coordinator of the Sociology of Religion Section of the Italian Sociology Association (AIS) with which she launched the "Mondoreligioni" festival.

Del Re founded the EPOS Intl. Agency of which was president of until 2017. From 2012, she also conducted intervention projects with the European Commission and others for the reconstruction of civil society in conflict zones (Iraq, Jordan). She also worked as an international electoral observer for the UN, OSCE, and the EU.

== Political career ==
In the 2018 Italian general election, Del Re was a candidate of the Five Star Movement for the Chamber of Deputies. During the campaign, she was already presented by the party's leader Luigi Di Maio as a possible Minister of Foreign Affairs and International Cooperation in case of an election win. After being elected member of parliament, she was appointed Deputy Minister for Foreign Affairs and International Cooperation in the cabinet of Prime Minister Giuseppe Conte in August 2018. Amid a reshuffle the following year, she remained in this position in Conte's second government.

Under Del Re's leadership, Italy notably increased its contribution to the Global Fund to Fight AIDS, Tuberculosis and Malaria in 2017, to 140 million euros for the three-year period beginning in 2017.

Del Re left the ministry after the collapse of the Conte government.

== Other activities ==
- European Council on Foreign Relations (ECFR), Member
