= Italian electoral law of 2005 =

Italian Electoral Law of 2005

Italian Parliament
- Long title: Changes to the rules for the election of the Chamber of Deputies and the Senate of the Republic
- Citation: Law No. 270 of 2005
- Enacted by: Chamber of Deputies
- Enacted by: Senate of the Republic
- Signed by: President Carlo Azeglio Ciampi
- Signed: 21 December 2005

Legislative history

Initiating chamber: Chamber of Deputies
- Introduced by: Roberto Calderoli (LN)
- Passed: 13 October 2005
- Voting summary: 323 voted for; 6 voted against; 6 abstained

Revising chamber: Senate of the Republic
- Passed: 14 December 2005
- Voting summary: 160 voted for; 119 voted against; 6 abstained

Amends
- Presidential Decree n. 361 of 1957; Legislative Decree n. 533 of 1993; Law n. 53 of 1990; Law n. 459 of 2001; Law n. 52 of 2015
- Status: Repealed

The law no. 270 of 21 December 2005 was a proportional electoral law with a majority prize and blocked lists that regulated the election of the Chamber of Deputies and the Senate in Italy in 2006, 2008 and 2013.

It was nicknamed Porcellum by Giovanni Sartori after its author, Roberto Calderoli, defined it a "porcata" (rascality) in a TV show.

== History ==
Commissioned by Silvio Berlusconi, who on 4 October 2005 "threatened a government crisis in the event that a proportional electoral reform was not approved", the law was approved a few months before the general election with the votes of the House of Freedoms (mainly Forza Italia, National Alliance, Northern League and Union of Christian and Centre Democrats), without the consent of the opposition (mainly Democrats of the Left, The Daisy and the Communist Refoundation Party), which criticized and opposed it.

In 2009, three abrogative referendums were held, aimed at changing this law in several places. These referendums, initially set for 18 May 2008, were then postponed to 21 June 2009 due to the early dissolution of the Houses, which took place on 6 February 2008. None of the three referendums reached the quorum of the majority of those entitled.

On 17 May 2013, the Supreme Court of Cassation harshly criticized the Calderoli law, highlighting important questions of constitutional legitimacy and entrusting the Constitutional Court with a possible judgment of unconstitutionality.

On 4 December 2013 the law was declared unconstitutional by the Constitutional Court in reference to the majority prize awarded to the most voted coalition, without a minimum threshold to be reached in order for the prize to be taken, and the impossibility for the voter to provide a preference.

The remaining part of the law (now colloquially referred to as Consultellum by the press) resulted in a pure proportional system. The parts regarding the Chamber were repealed by the Italian electoral law of 2015 (Italicum), while the parts regarding the Senate were repealed by the 2017 electoral law (Rosatellum).

== Provisions ==
=== Proportional system and blocked lists ===
The law introduced a system based on the proportional electoral formula of the "whole quotient and the highest remnants" (Hare method), but with a substantially majority spirit due to the thresholds and the strong majority premium. It provided for a system of blocked lists, in which the voter could not express any preference vote.

=== Majority bonus ===
It also provided for a majority bonus, to be awarded nationally (excluding Aosta Valley) for the Chamber of Deputies, and in each region for the Senate of the Republic (excluding Aosta Valley, Trentino-Alto Adige and Molise). For the Chamber, it was established that the list or coalition which obtained a plurality of the votes but did not obtain 340 seats, was to be assigned a further quota of seats beyond those already obtained, in order to reach this number. The 12 seats assigned to the Italians abroad constituency and the seat assigned to the Aosta Valley were assigned according to different rules: the relative votes were not calculated for the determination of the list or coalition of lists of relative majority and therefore did not contribute to triggering the majority premium. For the Senate, it was established that the list or coalition that obtained the majority of votes in the Region but did not receive 55% of the seats assigned to it, was assigned a further quota of seats, in order to reach that number.

=== Explicit programs and alliances ===
The law provided for the obligation, together with the presentation of electoral symbols, for each political force to deposit its program and to indicate its head. It also envisaged the possibility of mutual recognition between multiple lists, grouped together in coalitions.

=== Thresholds ===
To get seats in the Chamber, each party or list had to get at least 4% of the national votes while the coalitions had to get at least 10%. The lists linked to a coalition that exceeded the prescribed threshold participated in the allocation of seats if they exceeded 2% of the votes; the first party below this threshold within the same coalition also participated in the allocation of the seats.

To obtain seats in the Senate, each party or list had to get at least 8% of the votes while the coalitions had to get at least 20%. The lists linked to a coalition that had exceeded the prescribed threshold, participated in the allocation of seats if they exceeded 3% of the votes.

To protect the recognized linguistic minorities it was envisaged that the lists representing them, whether coalitioned or not, could still have access to the allocation of seats for the Chamber of Deputies obtaining at least 20% of the votes in the constituency in which they compete. For the Senate of the Republic, it was envisaged that 6 of the 7 seats due to Trentino-Alto Adige be assigned through uninominal colleges, maintaining in this single Region the mechanism envisaged by the previous election law.

== See also ==
- 2009 Italian electoral law referendum
- Italian electoral law of 1993
- Italian electoral law of 2015
- Italian electoral law of 2017
