= Italian electoral law of 2015 =

Italian Parliament
- Long title: Provisions on the election of the Chamber of Deputies
- Citation: Law No. 55 of 2015
- Territorial extent: Italy
- Passed by: Chamber of Deputies
- Passed: 12 March 2014
- Passed by: Senate of the Republic
- Passed: 27 January 2015
- Signed by: President Sergio Mattarella
- Signed: 6 May 2015
- Commenced: 8 May 2015

Legislative history

Initiating chamber: Chamber of Deputies
- Introduced by: Renzi Cabinet
- Passed: 12 March 2014
- Voting summary: 365 voted for; 156 voted against; 40 abstained

Revising chamber: Senate of the Republic
- Passed: 27 January 2015
- Voting summary: 184 voted for; 66 voted against; 2 abstained

Final stages
- Senate of the Republic amendments considered by the Chamber of Deputies: 4 May 2015
- Voting summary: 334 voted for; 61 voted against; 4 abstained

Amends
- Presidential Decree n. 361 of 1957
- Status: Repealed

The Italian electoral law of 2015, also known as Italicum, was an Italian electoral law passed in 2015. The law, which came into force on 1 July 2016, regulated only the election of the Chamber of Deputies, replacing the Italian electoral law of 2005, which had been ruled partly unconstitutional by the Constitutional Court of Italy in December 2013. It provided for a two-round system based on party-list proportional representation, including a majority bonus and a 3% election threshold. Candidates would have run in 100 multi-member constituencies using open lists. The largest party which won over 40% of the vote would automatically win a majority of seats; if no party won 40% of seats, a second round of voting would be held between the two largest parties, with the winner of the second round winning a majority of seats. The name "Italicum" was coined in 2014 by Democratic Party secretary and later Prime Minister of Italy, Matteo Renzi, who was one of the legislation's main proponent.

The law was written under the assumption that major constitutional reforms would have taken place by the time it came into force. The failure of the reforms in the 2016 Italian constitutional referendum created unforeseen complications, as electoral law for the Chamber of Deputies and Senate of the Republic were not harmonised. This was compounded by a January 2017 Constitutional Court ruling finding the Italicum partly unconstitutional. In October 2017, the Italicum was repealed by the Italian Parliament and replaced by the Rosatellum. The Italicum is the first and only electoral law to have been approved by the Italian Parliament but never used in a general election.

== History ==
The 2005 electoral law passed by the centre-right government, nicknamed the Porcellum, immediately received widespread criticism. The use of long closed lists, which gave party executives great power in deciding the composition of Parliament, was called into question, as was the regional allocation of the majority bonus in the Senate, which made a "clear winner" of the elections less likely.

After two unsuccessful attempts at repealing the law by referendum, in the 2013 general election, the law failed to produce a majority in the Senate: as a consequence, the only way to form a government was by means of a grand coalition between left wing and right wing parties that had harshly fought each other in the election. The resulting Letta Cabinet was perceived by many people as the second "unelected government" in a row (after the Monti Cabinet).

While the coalition agreed that a new electoral law was needed, it failed to agree on a specific model. The Democratic Party executive and prime minister Enrico Letta even went as far as requesting that his party vote against a parliamentary initiative by fellow democrat Roberto Giachetti to restore the previous Mattarellum law.

On 4 December 2013, the Constitutional Court judged the Porcellum partly unconstitutional: in particular, the implementation of a majority bonus without a threshold required to achieve it was struck down. This made electoral reform even more urgent, since proportional representation without majoritarian correction was thought to be incompatible with the competitive party system of Italy.

A few days later, on 8 December 2013, Matteo Renzi became the new leader of the Democratic Party. In his victory speech, he vowed to change the electoral law to counter the risk of "stabilized grand coalitions". Renzi's reformist agenda ultimately led to him replacing Letta as prime minister. Renzi came to an agreement with coalition partner Silvio Berlusconi regarding a set of institutional reforms, including a new majority-assuring law based on a two-round system, designed to make the necessitation of a grand coalition impossible. This law was nicknamed the Italicum.

The new law faced harsh opposition, even by members of the parties proposing it. However, it was approved by the Chamber of Deputies on 12 March 2014 and, in an amended form, by the Senate on 27 January 2015, with the support of a large majority.

After the election of Sergio Mattarella as President of Italy on 31 January 2015, Berlusconi withdrew his support of the bill. In order for it to receive its final approval by the Chamber of Deputies, the government decided to link it to a confidence vote (hinting at a snap election in case of a negative outcome). The bill was finally approved on 4 May 2015 and signed by President Mattarella two days later.

=== Political background ===
Several events contributed to the development of the electoral law into the current system:

- The collapse of the consociative party system that dominated Italian politics between 1946 and 1993, which was replaced by a new (sometimes harshly) competitive system, making pure party-list proportional representation undesirable and arguably demanding a strong majoritarian correction.
- The mediocre performance of electoral coalitions from 1994 to 2013: the two electoral laws of this period (the first the semi-proportional scorporo system, the second providing a majority bonus for the winning coalition) gave rise to electoral coalitions which were prone to dissolving once in power.
- The presence of small centrist parties in the Renzi Cabinet which lacked concentrated support, and as such were hostile to pure majoritarian solutions based on single-member constituencies, such as a first-past-the-post system.
- The effectiveness of the system used to elect Italian mayors and city councils which assures a majority and employs a runoff election (though, unlike the Italicum, gives the majority bonus to an electoral coalition rather than a single party).

== Provisions ==
Map of the electoral constituencies. Numbers indicate the number of deputies allocated to each constituency.

The Italicum system regulates the allocation of 617 of the 630 seats of the Chamber of Deputies, excluding 12 seats attributed to representatives of Italians living abroad and one seat for the Aosta Valley region. One uncommon feature of this system is that it is majority assuring, thanks to a majority bonus assigned to the winning party, after a second round of voting if necessary.

The territory of Italy is divided into 100 constituencies electing between 3 and 9 deputies, depending on their population. For each constituency, the parties designate a list of candidates: "head of list" candidates can run in up to 10 constituencies, while other candidates are limited to a single constituency. Gender balance is promoted by requiring that, in each region, head of lists of either sex for the same party should not exceed 60% of the total; additionally, candidates in all lists must be in a sequence alternating by gender.

In the first round, voters receive a ballot allowing them to vote for a single party and for its head of list candidate (pre-printed on the ballot), and are given the option to express up to two additional preference votes for other candidates of that party, by writing their name next to the party symbol. If two preference votes are expressed, they must be of a different sex, otherwise the second preference is discarded.

Only parties passing a 3% minimum election threshold in the first round are assigned seats. If the party receiving the plurality of the votes achieves over 40% of total votes, it is attributed a minimum of 340 seats (54%). The remaining seats are allocated to the other parties in a proportional fashion, and no second round takes place.

If no party achieves over 40% in the first round, a second round takes place two weeks after the first. This time, only the two highest-voted parties from the first round participate. The party winning the second round is attributed 340 seats, and the remaining seats are allocated to the other parties in a proportional fashion, according to the results of the first round.

The proportional allocation of seats follows the largest remainder method. Each party receives a certain number of seats depending on its national result: these seats are then distributed amongst the 100 constituencies, starting from the head of list and continuing according to the number of preference votes for each candidate.

An amendment, known as "Erasmus amendment", ensures Italians studying abroad in the Erasmus programme can vote.

== Reactions ==
Roberto D'Alimonte (LUISS), who was the main scholar proposing the new system, said that "the Italicum is a good instrument that represents a point of satisfactory equilibrium between governability and representativeness. However ... good government ... depends mostly on the men and women who use it". He also made a comparison with the 2015 United Kingdom general election, stating that "the Italicum's advantage is indeed that the winner will be assigned 340 seats and the losers will have to divide the remaining 278 seats.... The point is that the Italicum is a majority-assuring system, such that it ensures that there will be an undisputed winner, but unlike the British system, it is not a winner-takes-all system. In fact, the winner does not take the entire pot, but only 54 percent".

Former president of Italy Giorgio Napolitano, who was a key player in pushing Italian parties into reforming the electoral system, remarked that "this law certainly hasn't been written in a month, it took more than one year, there have been many discussions, there has been a committee of scholars who opened the way, therefore I believe this has been an important accomplishment".

Among the politicians critical of the reform, former prime minister Enrico Letta judged the Italicum "a close relative to the Porcellum" and voted against its adoption.

Likewise, scholars have been divided on the electoral reform. Augusto Barbera (emeritus professor at the University of Bologna and one of the most prominent experts of Italian constitutional law) was unhappy with the possibility for a candidate to run in more than one constituency and with the low 3% election threshold but otherwise praised the law. He said that the system does not introduce presidentialism but strengthens the powers of the prime minister, which is "the characteristic of all functioning parliamentary systems (United Kingdom, German chancellorship, Spanish premiership)".

According to Stefano Ceccanti (Sapienza University of Rome), the law is "definitely a good one, it would have been difficult for this fragmented, troublesome Parliament... to do any better".

Tommaso Frosini (Suor Orsola Benincasa University of Naples) stated that "it is to the lawmaker's credit to have been able to make a synthesis of the two principles" of governability and proportionality.

According to Pasquale Pasquino (New York University), the Italicum "should be preferred over pure majoritarian systems" in which "the electoral law decimates not only small parties, but even parties going close to a 20% of the people's votes".

Among critics, Gianfranco Pasquino (University of Bologna) wrote that "the Italicum is a bad reform with a single merit: the runoff giving real power to electors. As for the rest, the party bonus is wrong, as well as multiple candidatures and the low threshold for the access to the Parliament".

Constitutional law expert Michele Ainis (Roma Tre University) was also critical of the reform. According to him, "the Italicum determines a direct election of the prime minister, giving him a turnkey majority", introducing a constitutional reform by means of an ordinary law.

Among the foreign press, the Spanish newspaper El País commented that "the important thing is that the law approved by the Chamber of Deputies obtains stability and governability, nevertheless respecting the decision coming from the polls as much as possible"

Moshe Arens, writing for Haaretz (the main left-wing journal in Israel), has suggested to use the Italicum to regulate the election of the Knesset.

== Constitutional review ==
On 24 February 2016 a court in Messina sent the election law for review to the Constitutional Court after declaring petitioners' applications admissible. The judges called for the Constitutional Court to rule on eight out of thirteen claims that the Italicum breached the Italian Constitution.

On 25 January 2017, the Constitutional Court ruled some aspects of the Italicum unconstitutional, including the two-round system and the clause allowing head candidates, who were permitted to run in multiple constituencies, to choose which constituency they wished to represent. The majority bonus was left intact, giving a majority to any party which won over 40% of votes in a single round of voting. After the ruling, the Italicum essentially provided for pure proportional representation, unless a party was able to win over 40% of the vote and secure a majority.

== Repeal ==
The victory of the "No" votes in the 2016 Italian constitutional referendum prompted the resignation of Prime Minister Matteo Renzi, the chief proponent of both the constitutional reform and the Italicum law. Electoral law became a pressing issue, as the Italicum was written under the assumption that the Senate would be an indirectly elected body by the next general election. As such, the Senate was not addressed in the bill, and remained under the previous election law (Porcellum). The issue of two different election laws for the two houses of Parliament was further compounded after the Constitutional Court ruled that the two-round aspect of the Italicum was unconstitutional, revising part of the law, and effectively removing one of the distinctive aspects of the law, whose main goal was to guarantee the existence of a parliamentary majority.

A new electoral law was needed, however opinions were diverse among political forces. Renzi personally supported a return to a semi-proportional system similar to the 1993 Mattarellum law. Berlusconi's Forza Italia called for pure proportional representation, while both the Five Star Movement and Northern League called for snap elections using the revised Italicum, with the same law applied to the Senate. Multiple proposals were floated, including a mixed-member proportional system similar to the German system, but failed to garner enough support for a serious debate. Ultimately, a parallel voting system similar to the Mattarellum was passed in October 2017, succeeding both the Italicum in the Chamber of Deputies and the Porcellum in the Senate. This system, known as the Rosatellum, allocates 37% of seats to single-member constituencies and 61% to proportional lists.
