= Italian electoral law of 2017 =

Italian Electoral Law of 2017

Italian Parliament
- Long title: Changes to the electoral system of the Chamber of Deputies and of the Senate of the Republic. Delegation to the Government for the determination of single-member and multi-nominal electoral districts.
- Citation: Law No. 165 of 2017
- Enacted by: Chamber of Deputies
- Enacted by: Senate of the Republic
- Signed by: Sergio Mattarella
- Signed: 3 November 2017

Legislative history

Initiating chamber: Chamber of Deputies
- Introduced by: Ettore Rosato (PD)
- Passed: 12 October 2017
- Voting summary: 375 voted for; 215 voted against

Revising chamber: Senate of the Republic
- Passed: 26 October 2017
- Voting summary: 214 voted for; 61 voted against

Amends
- Presidential Decree n. 361 of 1957; Legislative Decree n. 533 of 1993; Law n. 53 of 1990; Law n. 459 of 2001; Law n. 52 of 2015
- Status: Repealed

The Italian electoral law of 2017, colloquially known by the nickname Rosatellum after Ettore Rosato, the Democratic Party (PD) leader in the Chamber of Deputies who first proposed the new law, is a parallel voting system, which acts as a mixed electoral system, with 37% of seats allocated using a first-past-the-post electoral system and 63% using a proportional method, with one round of voting. The Chamber and Senate of the Republic did not differ in the way they allocated the proportional seats, both using the largest remainder method of allocating seats.

The new electoral law was supported by the PD and its government ally Popular Alternative but also by the opposition parties Forza Italia, Lega Nord, and Liberal Popular Alliance. Despite many protests from the Five Star Movement, the Democratic and Progressive Movement, Italian Left, and Brothers of Italy, the electoral law was approved on 12 October 2017 by the Chamber of Deputies with 375 votes in favor and 215 against, and on 26 October 2017 by the Senate with 214 votes against 61.

The law regulates the election of the Chamber and Senate, replacing Porcellum of 2005 and Italicum of 2015, both modified by the Constitutional Court of Italy after judging them to be partly unconstitutional.

On 8 October 2026, the Chamber of Deputies gave its final approval to a new electoral law which assigns seats on the basis of proportional representation with a majority bonus, repealing the Rosatellum.

== History ==
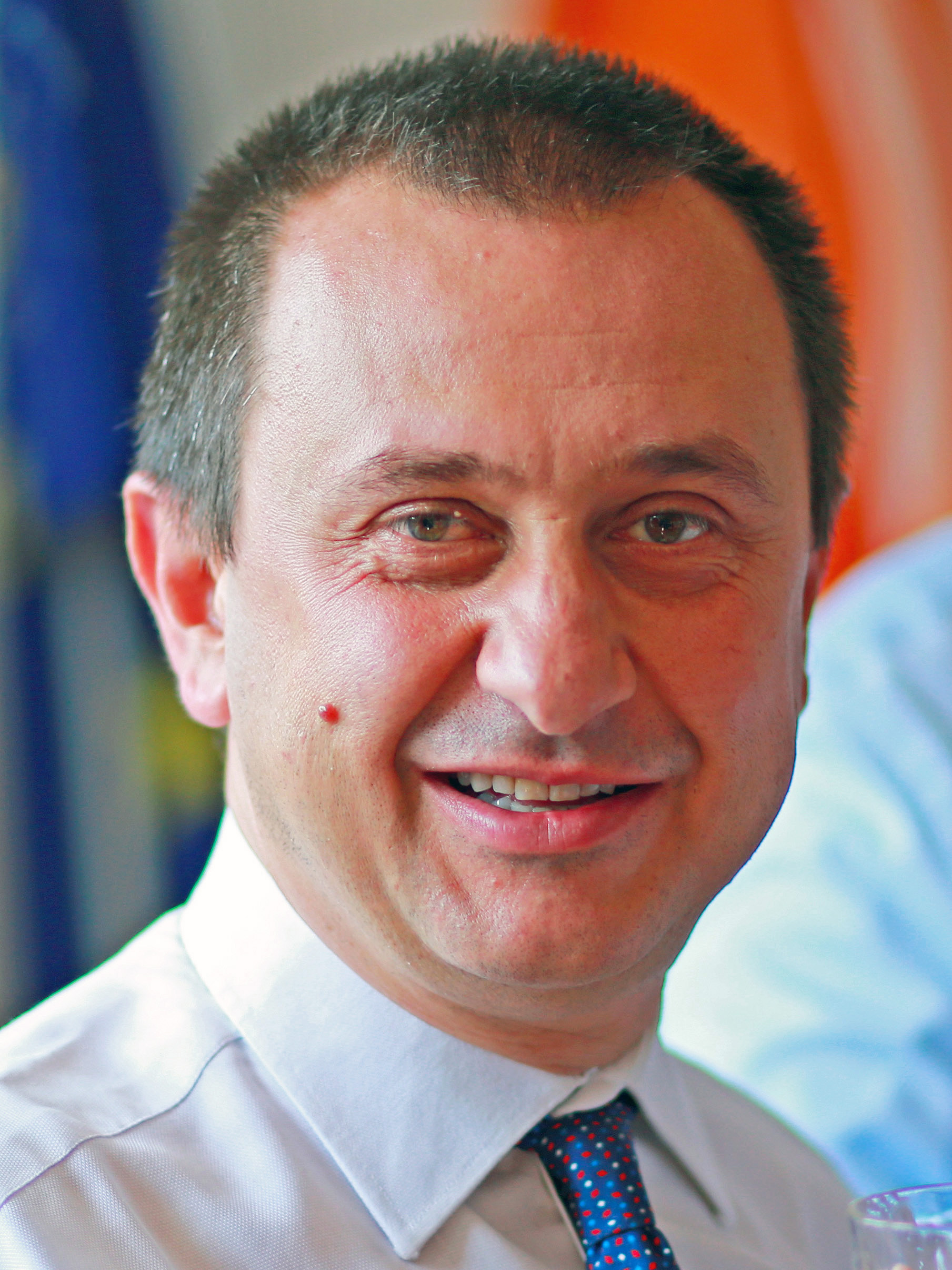
Ettore Rosato, former Democratic Party leader in the Chamber of Deputies and main proponent of the 2017 electoral law.

As a consequence of the result of the 2016 Italian constitutional referendum, in which the Senate reform was rejected, the two chambers of the Italian Parliament ended up with two different electoral laws, which lacked uniformity. As a matter of fact, the electoral law for the Chamber of Deputies passed by Matteo Renzi's government, the so-called Italicum, based on a strong winner-take-all principle, was still in effect, whereas in the Senate a pure proportional system (the remnants of the so-called Porcellum, the electoral law approved by the cabinet of Silvio Berlusconi in 2005 and then declared extensively unconstitutional by the Constitutional Court in January 2014) was in force. The two systems differed on several aspects, among which the possibility of forming coalitions before the elections (only allowed at the Senate) and the election thresholds.

In June 2017, the Democratic Party together with the Five Star Movement, Forza Italia and Northern League agreed on a law, known as Tedeschellum, which was based on a similar system to the one used in Germany. However, the agreement among the four parties did not survive a secret-ballot vote during the first reading at the Chamber of Deputies and the bill was put aside.

After few weeks Ettore Rosato, the leader of the group of the Democratic Party at the Chamber of Deputies, proposed a new bill based on a mixed system, with half of the seats allocated using the first-past-the-post and the other half using a proportional allocation. The bill was not popular in its original version, since several opposition parties considered the number of seats allocated with the FPTP system too high.

A later and revised version of the Rosatellum, known as Rosatellum bis was approved by PD, FI, LN, AP and ALA in October 2017, becoming the new electoral law for both the houses of the Parliament.

== Main characteristics and operation ==
The national elections use a mixed single vote into a parallel voting system, with 36.8̅2̅5̅3̅9̅7̅% of seats allocated using a first-past-the-post electoral system and 63.1̅7̅4̅6̅0̅3̅% using a proportional method (the latter including the seats allocated to Italians abroad), with one round of voting. The Senate and the Chamber of Deputies do not differ in the way the proportional seats are allocated, both using the largest remainder method of allocating seats.

Following the 2020 constitutional referendum, the Senate of the Republic included 200 elected members, of whom:

- 74 are elected in single-member districts.
- 122 are elected by proportional representation.
- 4 are elected by the Italians abroad.
- a small, variable number of senators-for-life include former presidents of the Republic and no more than 5 other persons appointed for life by a president of the Republic, according to special constitutional provisions (scientists, writers, artists, social workers, politicians, tycoons).

The Senate is elected on a single ballot. The ballot includes the district's member, on a purely plurality basis and the parties and party-lists were listed that supported him, which was used to determine the proportional seats, with a 3% minimum threshold for party representation.

Following the 2020 referendum, the Chamber of Deputies had 400 members, of whom

- 147 are elected in single member districts.
- 245 are elected by proportional representation.
- 8 are elected by the Italians abroad.

As the Senate, the Chamber of Deputies is elected on a single ballot.

The complicated mechanism known as scorporo, which was used to tabulate PR votes in the Mattarellum, was abolished in the new electoral law.

The law also re-introduced a closed list system for the party lists on the second ballot, i.e., excluding voters from the decision as to which members of that party would enter parliament, thereby guaranteeing reelection of party leaders whose popular support was rapidly declining (new elections were to be held once the new electoral law was fully implemented).

=== Ballot paper ===
The voting paper

The ballot, which is a single one for the first-past-the-post and the proportional systems, shows the names of the candidates to single-member constituencies and, in close conjunction with them, the symbols of the linked lists for the proportional part, each one with a list of the relative candidates.

Voters will be able to cast their vote in three different ways:

- Drawing a sign on the symbol of a list: in this case the vote extends to the candidate in the single-member constituency which is supported by that list.
- Drawing a sign on the name of the candidate of the single-member constituency and another one on the symbol of one list that supports the candidate: the result is the same as that described above; panachage is not permitted, meaning voters cannot vote simultaneously for a candidate in the FPTP constituency and for a party list which is not linked to that candidate.
- Drawing a sign only on the name of the candidate for the FPTP constituency, without indicating any list: in this case, the vote is valid for the candidate in the single-member constituency and also automatically extended to the list that supports them; if that candidate is however connected to several lists, the vote is divided proportionally between them, based on the votes that each one has obtained in that constituency.

In an effort to mitigate fragmentation, split-ticket voting is not allowed.

=== Graphical summary ===
==== From 2018 until 2022 ====
Distribution of seats in the Chamber of Deputies and the Senate of the Republic
Chamber of Deputies			Senate of the Republic		
Method	Seats	Percentage	Method	Seats	Percentage
First-past-the-post	232	37%	First-past-the-post	116	37%
Proportional representation	386	61%	Proportional representation	193	61%
Overseas constituencies	12	2%	Overseas constituencies	6	2%

==== Since 2022 ====
Distribution of seats in the Chamber of Deputies and the Senate of the Republic
Chamber of Deputies			Senate of the Republic		
Method	Seats	Percentage	Method	Seats	Percentage
First-past-the-post	147	37%	First-past-the-post	74	37%
Proportional representation	245	61%	Proportional representation	122	61%
Overseas constituencies	8	2%	Overseas constituencies	4	2%

=== Distribution of seats by region ===
==== From 2018 until 2022 ====
Chamber of Deputies

Region	Seats	Region	Seats	Region	Seats	Region	Seats
Abruzzo	14	Campania	60	Lombardy	102	Sicily	52
Aosta Valley	1	Emilia-Romagna	45	Marche	16	Trentino-Alto Adige	11
Apulia	42	Friuli-Venezia Giulia	13	Molise	3	Tuscany	38
Basilicata	6	Lazio	58	Piedmont	45	Umbria	9
Calabria	20	Liguria	16	Sardinia	17	Veneto	50

Constituency	Seats
Europe	5
South America	4
North and Central America	2
Asia, Africa, Oceania and Antarctica	1

Senate of the Republic

Region	Seats	Region	Seats	Region	Seats	Region	Seats
Abruzzo	7	Campania	29	Lombardy	49	Sicily	25
Aosta Valley	1	Emilia-Romagna	22	Marche	8	Trentino-Alto Adige	7
Apulia	20	Friuli-Venezia Giulia	7	Molise	2	Tuscany	18
Basilicata	7	Lazio	28	Piedmont	22	Umbria	7
Calabria	10	Liguria	8	Sardinia	8	Veneto	24

Constituency	Seats
Europe	2
South America	2
North and Central America	1
Asia, Africa, Oceania and Antarctica	1

=== Reforms ===
==== Adaptation to constitutional reform ====
Law 51/2019 was meant to adapt the Rosatellum to a reduction of the number of seats in both houses of the Italian Parliament. It became law on 26 June 2019. It has been called a riformina elettorale, or little electoral reform.

A constitutional amendment procedure was initiated during the 18th legislature by the Five Stars Movement, to cut the size of both houses by more than a third (from 630 and 315 members, to 400 and 200). To avoid incompatibility with the proposed amendment, the 2019 law adapts the Rosatellum law, and sets fractions for each type of seat (proportional or majoritary) instead of exact numbers. The ratio of single-winner districts over the total number of seats in Rosatellum was equal to 3/8 in both houses, and the law 51/2019 retains those proportions.

Besides the Five Stars Movement, the law was supported by Lega and was opposed by the Democratic Party, until it joined the Conte II Cabinet in August 2019.

==== Germanicum ====
On the 9 January 2020, Giuseppe Brescia, President of the lower house's Constitutional Affairs Committee, submitted bill AC 2329 (nicknamed Germanicum) that would replace Rosatellum with a system based on proportional representation. The bill would abolish single member constituencies, end the use of joint lists and increase the threshold from three to five percent nationally, while creating the 'right of tribune' where if a party did not reach the national threshold they could gain representation if they earned a quotient in at least three constituencies in two regions in the Chamber and in the Senate the party would need to receive a quotient in a constituency. Seats in the Chamber would firstly be apportioned on national results then subsequently into multimember constituencies, while in the Senate the process is similar but seats are first apportioned regionally, with both Houses using the Imperiali quota.
