= 1994 Italian general election in Sardinia =

The Italian general election of 1994 took place on 27 March 1994. In Sardinia, the election was won by the centre-right Pole of Good Government. The Pact for Italy and the Patto Segni, both led by Sardinian Mario Segni had their best result in the region, while the Sardinian Action Party had a remarkable result in single-seat constituencies.

== Results ==
=== Chamber of Deputies ===
Coalitions	Single-seat constituencies			Proportional system					Total
Coalitions	votes	votes (%)	seats	Parties	votes	votes (%)	seats	tot.	seats
Pole of Good Government	362,110	35.1	9	Forza Italia	245,630	21.2	1	1	10
Pole of Good Government	362,110	35.1	9	National Alliance	137,874	11.9	-	1	10
Pole of Good Government	362,110	35.1	9	Pannella List	32,926	2.8	-	1	10
Alliance of Progressives	305,395	29.6	4	Democratic Party of the Left	228,199	19.7	1	1	5
Alliance of Progressives	305,395	29.6	4	Communist Refoundation Party	70,813	6.1	-	1	5
Alliance of Progressives	305,395	29.6	4	Italian Socialist Party	36,651	3.2	-	1	5
Alliance of Progressives	305,395	29.6	4	Democratic Alliance	26,074	2.3	-	1	5
Alliance of Progressives	305,395	29.6	4	Federation of the Greens	24,452	2.1	-	1	5
Alliance of Progressives	305,395	29.6	4	The Network	7,615	0.7	-	1	5
Pact for Italy	231,362	22.5	1	Segni Pact	211,810	17.4	1	2	3
Pact for Italy	231,362	22.5	1	Italian People's Party	114,867	10.0	1	2	3
Sardinian Action Party	82,258	8.0	-	-	-	-	-	-	-
Independentist Sardinian Party	14,334	1.4	-	Independentist Sardinian Party	24,043	2.1	-	-	-
Others	35,598	3.4	-	others	9,326	0.8	-	-	-
Total coalitions	1,030,324	100.0	14	Total parties	1,160,280	100.0	4	4	18

Sources: Ministry of the Interior and Istituto Cattaneo

=== Senate ===
Coalitions	Single-seat constituencies			Prop.	Total
Coalitions	votes	votes (%)	seats	seats	seats
Alliance of Progressives	267,853	31.4	2	1	3
Pole of Good Government	244,532	28.6	3	1	4
Pact for Italy	207,800	24.3	1	1	2
Sardinian Action Party	88,225	10.3	-	-	-
Independentist Sardinian Party	26,198	3.1	-	-	-
The Network	12,560	1.5	-	-	-
Others	7,043	0.8	-	-	-
Total coalitions	854,211	100.0	6	3	9

Source: Ministry of the Interior
