= Populars for Reform =

Italian political party

The Populars for Reform (Italian: Popolari per la Riforma) was a Christian-democratic and liberal political party in Italy.

It was founded in 1992 by Mario Segni as a split from Christian Democracy. The main goal of the party was electoral reform from proportional representation to a first-past-the-post system. In 1993 it merged with Democratic Alliance, which had identical goals, but, when that party decided to take part to the Alliance of Progressives with the ex-Communist Democratic Party of the Left, Segni set up an independent party again: the Segni Pact, which contested the 1994 general election in coalition with the Italian People's Party, named Pact for Italy.
