= Legislature XII of Italy =

12th legislature of the Italian Republic (1994–1996)

Legislature XII of Italy XII legislatura della Repubblica Italiana
- 12th legislature

Type
- Type: bicameral
- Houses: Chamber of Deputies; Senate of the Republic

History
- Founded: 15 April 1994
- Disbanded: 8 May 1996 (2 years, 23 days)
- Preceded by: XI Legislature
- Succeeded by: XIII Legislature

Leadership
- President of the Senate: Carlo Scognamiglio, FI since 17 April 1994
- President of the Chamber of Deputies: Irene Pivetti, LN since 16 April 1994

Structure
- Seats: 630 (C); 315 (S)
- Chamber of Deputies political groups: PDS (164); FI (110); AN (105); LN (71); CCD (42); FLD (28); PPI (27); PRC (24); Dem (21); Mixed (36)
- Senate political groups: PDS (74); AN (47); LN (40); FI (36); PPI (22); CCD (15); PRC (14); SC (13); PSI (10); SD (10); LIF (10); FdV–Rete (7); Mixed (27)

Elections
- Chamber of Deputies voting system: Mattarellum
- Senate voting system: Mattarellum
- Last general election: 27 March 1994

Meeting place
- Palazzo Montecitorio, Rome (C)
- Palazzo Madama, Rome (S)

Website
- storia.camera.it/legislature/leg-repubblica-XII www.senato.it/leg12/home

Constitution
- Constitution of Italy

The Legislature XII of Italy (Italian: XII Legislatura della Repubblica Italiana) lasted from 15 April 1994 until 8 May 1996. Its composition was the one resulting from the snap general election of 27 March 1994. The election was called by President Scalfaro, after he dissolved the houses of Parliament on 16 January 1994. This decision was connected to some major events that permanently changed the shape of Italian internal politics during the beginning of the '90s, such as Tangentopoli and the Mafia trials.

This legislature marks the beginning of the so-called "Second Republic" (Italian: Seconda Repubblica), characterised by the progressive decline and dismantlement of the traditional parties, such as the Christian Democracy, the Italian Socialist Party, the Italian Communist Party, and the Italian Social Movement. It also marks the official entrance of Silvio Berlusconi in Italian politics.

This was the first legislature to apply the new majoritarian electoral system (also known as Mattarellum), which replaced the proportional system in effect since 1946.

== Government ==
Prime Minister	Party	Term of office		Government	Composition
Prime Minister	Party	Took office	Left office	Government	Composition
Silvio Berlusconi (b. 1936)	Forza Italia	10 May 1994	17 January 1995	Berlusconi I	FI • LN • AN • CCD • UdC (PdL–PBG)
Lamberto Dini (b. 1931)	Independent	17 January 1995	17 May 1996	Dini	Independents (Technocratic cabinet)

== Composition ==
=== Chamber of Deputies ===
- President: Irene Pivetti (LN), elected on 16 April 1994
- Vice Presidents: Luciano Violante (PDS), Adriana Poli Bortone (AN, until 25 May 1994), Lorenzo Acquarone (PPI), Vittorio Dotti (FI, until 9 November 1994), Ignazio La Russa (AN, from 25 May 1994)

Parliamentary groups in the Chamber of Deputies
Initial composition		Final composition		
Parliamentary group	Seats	Parliamentary group	Seats	Change
Progressives – Federative	143	Progressives – Federative	164	▲21
Northern League	118	Northern League	71	▼47
Forza Italia	112	Forza Italia	110	▼2
National Alliance – MSI	109	National Alliance	105	▼4
Communist Refoundation – Progressives	39	Communist Refoundation – Progressives	24	▼15
Italian People's Party	33	Italian People's Party	27	▼6
Christian Democratic Centre	27	Christian Democratic Centre	42	▲15
		Federalists and Liberal Democrats	28	▲28
		The Democrats	21	▲21
Mixed	49	Mixed	36	▼13
Linguistic Minorities	4	Linguistic Minorities	4	Steady
Democratic Alliance	17			▼17
Italian Socialist Party	14			▼14
Segni Pact	9			▼9
		Unitarian Communists	14	▲14
Non inscrits	5	Non inscrits	18	▲13
Total seats	630	Total seats	628	▼2

=== Senate of the Republic ===
- President: Carlo Scognamiglio Pasini (FI), elected on 16 April 1994
- Vice Presidents: Carlo Rognoni (PDS), Michele Pinto (PPI), Marcello Staglieno (LN), Romano Misserville (AN)

Parliamentary groups in the Senate of the Republic
Initial composition		Final composition		
Parliamentary group	Seats	Parliamentary group	Seats	Change
Progressives – Federative	76	Progressives – Federative	74	▼2
Northern League	60	Northern League	40	▼20
National Alliance – Italian Social Movement	48	National Alliance	47	▼1
Forza Italia	36	Forza Italia	36	Steady
Italian People's Party	34	Italian People's Party	22	▼12
Communist Refoundation – Progressives	18	Communist Refoundation – Progressives	14	▼4
Progressives – Greens – The Network	13	Progressives – Greens – The Network	7	▼6
Christian Democratic Centre	12	Christian Democratic Centre	15	▲3
Progressive – PSI	10	Labour – Socialist – Progressive	10	Steady
		Crossed Shield	13	▲13
		Democratic Left	10	▲10
		Federalist Italian League	10	▲10
Mixed	19	Mixed	27	▲8
South Tyrolean People's Party	3	South Tyrolean People's Party	3	Steady
Non inscrits	16	Non inscrits	24	▲8
Total seats	326	Total seats	325	▼1

Notes

- Of the 315 elected senators, 11 Senators for life were added at the beginning of the term distributed as follows:
  - 3 from the Partito Popolare Italiano: Giulio Andreotti, Carlo Bo, Amintore Fanfani
  - 1 from the group Progressisti – PSI: Francesco De Martino
  - 7 with no affiliation: Gianni Agnelli, Norberto Bobbio, Francesco Cossiga, Giovanni Leone, Giovanni Spadolini (died in August 1994), Paolo Emilio Taviani, Leo Valiani

==== Senators for Life ====
Senator	Motivation	Appointed by	From	Till
Amintore Fanfani	Merits in the social field	President Giovanni Leone	Previous legislature	Next legislature
Giovanni Leone	Former president of Italy	ex officio	Previous legislature	Next legislature
Leo Valiani	Merits in the social field	President Sandro Pertini	Previous legislature	Next legislature
Carlo Bo	Merits in the literary field	President Sandro Pertini	Previous legislature	Next legislature
Norberto Bobbio	Merits in the social and scientific field	President Sandro Pertini	Previous legislature	Next legislature
Giovanni Spadolini	Merits in the social field	President Francesco Cossiga	Previous legislature	4 August 1994 (deceased)
Gianni Agnelli	Merits in the social field	President Francesco Cossiga	Previous legislature	Next legislature
Giulio Andreotti	Merits in the social field	President Francesco Cossiga	Previous legislature	Next legislature
Francesco De Martino	Merits in the social field	President Francesco Cossiga	Previous legislature	Next legislature
Paolo Emilio Taviani	Merits in the social field	President Francesco Cossiga	Previous legislature	Next legislature
Francesco Cossiga	Former president of Italy	ex officio	Previous legislature	Next legislature
