= Bettino Craxi =

Italian politician (1934–2000)

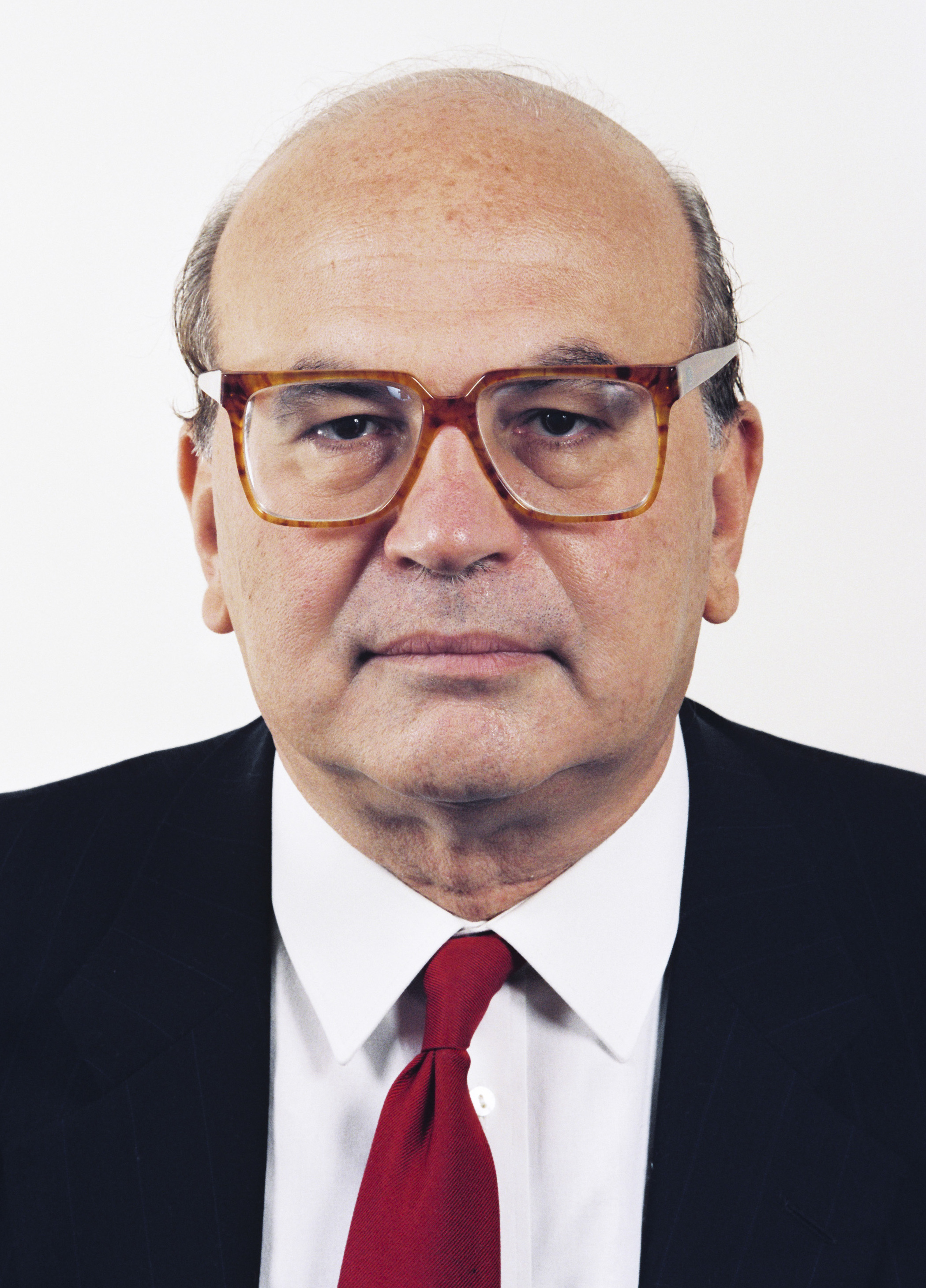
- Official portrait, 1989

Prime Minister of Italy
- In office 4 August 1983 – 18 April 1987
- President: Sandro Pertini; Francesco Cossiga
- Deputy: Arnaldo Forlani
- Preceded by: Amintore Fanfani
- Succeeded by: Amintore Fanfani

Secretary of the Italian Socialist Party
- In office 15 July 1976 – 12 February 1993
- Preceded by: Francesco De Martino
- Succeeded by: Giorgio Benvenuto

Member of the Chamber of Deputies
- In office 5 June 1968 – 15 April 1994
- Constituency: Milan (1968–83; 1992–94); Naples (1983–92)

Member of the European Parliament
- In office 25 July 1989 – 30 June 1992
- Constituency: North-West Italy
- In office 17 July 1979 – 4 August 1983
- Constituency: North-West Italy

Personal details
- Born: Benedetto Craxi; 24 February 1934 Milan, Kingdom of Italy
- Died: 19 January 2000 (aged 65) Hammamet, Tunisia
- Party: Italian Socialist Party
- Spouse: Anna Maria Moncini (m. 1959)
- Children: Bobo Craxi; Stefania Craxi
- Education: University of Milan (attended)

Benedetto "Bettino" Craxi (UK: /ˈkræksi/ KRAK-see, Italian: [betˈtiːno ˈkraksi], Sicilian: [ˈkɾaʃʃɪ]; 24 February 1934 – 19 January 2000) was an Italian politician and statesman, leader of the Italian Socialist Party (PSI) from 1976 to 1993, and the 45th prime minister of Italy from 1983 to 1987. He was the first PSI member to become prime minister and the second from a socialist party to hold the office. He led the fourth-longest government in the Italian Republic and he is considered one of the most influential politicians of Italy.

Craxi was involved in investigations conducted by Mani pulite judges in Milan, eventually being convicted for political corruption and illicit financing of the PSI. He always rejected the charges of corruption while admitting to the illegal funding that permitted costly political activity, the PSI being less financially powerful than the two larger parties, Christian Democracy (DC) and the Italian Communist Party (PCI). Craxi's government and party were also supported by future prime minister Silvio Berlusconi, a media magnate and personal friend of Craxi.

Craxi maintained strong links with many leaders of the Western European left, including François Mitterrand, Felipe González, Andreas Papandreou, and Mário Soares, and was one of the main representatives of Western European socialism. Craxi's supporters especially praised his foreign policy, which was assertive and often led to confrontations with the United States, on issues such as Palestinian territories, terrorism, and Craxi's close relations with Arab socialist governments.

Craxi was often nicknamed by his detractors il Cinghialone ('The Big Boar') due to his physical size. This name was given him by his long-time ally and rival at the same time, DC leader Giulio Andreotti.

== Early life ==
Craxi was born in Milan on 24 February 1934. His father Vittorio Craxi was a Sicilian lawyer and anti-fascist who was persecuted by the regime of Benito Mussolini while his mother Maria Ferrari was a housewife from Sant'Angelo Lodigiano. During World War II, the young Craxi was sent to the Catholic college Edmondo De Amicis due to his unruly character and to protect him from fascist violence in retaliation for his father's anti-fascist activities.

After the war, his father assumed the role of vice-prefect in Milan and then the prefect in Como, where he moved with his family in 1945. A few months later, Craxi returned to college, first in Como and then in Cantù, where he considered entering a seminary. Craxi's father stood in the 1948 Italian general election for the Popular Democratic Front, a political alliance between the Italian Socialist Party (PSI) and the Italian Communist Party (PCI). He campaigned for his father and later joined the PSI at the age of 17.

== Early political career ==
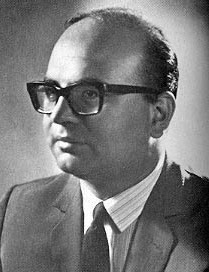
Craxi during the 1960s in his first years as deputy

Craxi was precocious and rose to many levels of public office at an early age. Meanwhile, he attended the faculty of Law in University of Milan and then the faculty of Political Science in Urbino, Craxi founded the "Socialist University Nucleus" joining the "New University" group and adhering to the CUDI (Italian Democratic University Centre), the student group that supported the left-wing forces.

During this period he engaged for the first time in public speaking, organizing conferences, debates, and film screenings, and in 1956 he became part of the PSI Provincial Committee in Milan, and leader of the Socialist Youth Federation.

In 1956, following the Soviet invasion of Hungary, Craxi with a group of loyalists committed himself to the detachment of the Socialist Party from its pro-Communist policy, but he failed: his proposal to associate the Socialist Youth Movement with the International Organisation of Democratic Youth was rejected.

In November 1956 he was elected town councillor in Sant'Angelo Lodigiano (birthplace of his mother), and in 1957 he was elected to the Central Committee of the PSI representing the autonomist current of Pietro Nenni.

In 1958 the party sent him to Sesto San Giovanni as a responsible of the organization; in November 1960 he was elected city councilor in Milan with more than 1,000 preferences and became assessor in the junta of Gino Cassinis.

In 1961 he was excluded from the Central Committee of the Socialist Party by the new Secretary Francesco De Martino. In 1963 he was appointed leader of the Milan Provincial Secretariat of the PSI and in 1965 Craxi became a member of the National Leadership. Meanwhile, in November 1964, he was re-elected city councillor in Milan, continuing his public commitment as assessor for Charity and Assistance in the council of Pietro Bucalossi.

In 1966, with the formation of the Unified Socialist Party, a political alliance between the Socialist Party and the Italian Democratic Socialist Party (PSDI), Craxi became provincial secretary of the PSU in Milan, along with by the social democrat Enrico Rizzi and Renzo Peruzzotti.

In 1968 general election Craxi was elected for the first time at the Chamber of Deputies with 23,788 votes, in the constituency of Milan–Pavia. In 1970 after the end of the PSU alliance, Craxi became Vice Secretary of the PSI, as proposed by Giacomo Mancini.

During this period he was a strong supporters of the Organic Centre-left coalition, between the Christian Democrats of Aldo Moro and Amintore Fanfani, the Socialists of Pietro Nenni, the Social Democrats of Giuseppe Saragat and the Republicans of Ugo La Malfa.

In 1972 with the re-election of Francesco De Martino as National Secretary of the Socialist Party during the Genoa Congress, Craxi was confirmed with Giovanni Mosca in the role of Deputy Secretary, receiving the commission to treat the international relations of the party. As the representative of PSI at the Socialist International, Craxi formed ties with some of the main European future leaders, like Willy Brandt, Felipe González, François Mitterrand, Mário Soares, Michel Rocard and Andreas Papandreou.

As responsible for the PSI foreign policy he supported, also financially, some socialist parties banned by the dictatorships of their respective countries, including the Spanish Socialist Workers Party, the Panhellenic Socialist Movement and the Chilean Socialist Party of Salvador Allende, of whom Craxi was a personal friend.

== Secretary of the PSI ==
In 1976 the Secretary Francesco De Martino wrote an article in the Socialist newspaper Avanti! that caused the fall of the government Aldo Moro and the subsequent snap election, which saw an impressive growth of the Italian Communist Party led by a young leader, Enrico Berlinguer, while the Christian Democracy managed to remain the majority party on just a few votes. Instead for the PSI, those elections were a crushing defeat: the votes went down under the threshold of 10%. De Martino, pointing to a new alliance with the Communists, was forced to resign and opened a serious crisis within the party.

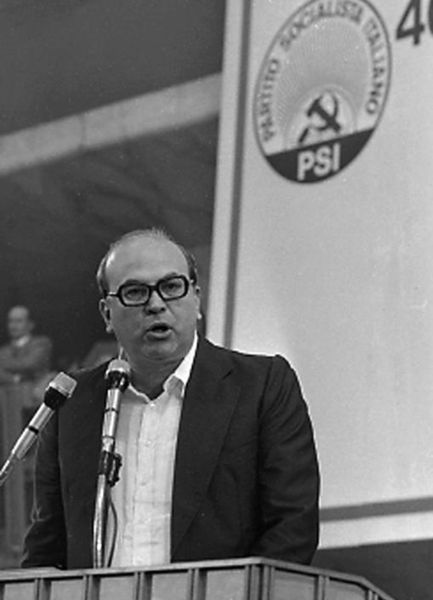
Craxi after the election as PSI Secretary in 1976

Craxi was appointed to the vacant position of National Secretary of the party, ending years of factional fighting within the PSI. Ironically, the "old guard" saw him as short-lived leader, allowing each faction time to regroup. However, he was able to consolidate power and implement his policies. In particular, he sought and managed to distance the party from the Communists, bringing it into an alliance with Christian Democracy and other centrist parties, while maintaining a leftist and reformist profile.

Craxi always opposed the Historic Compromise policy of Moro and Berlinguer, a political alliance and an accommodation between the Christian Democrats and the Communists; the alliance would inevitably make the Socialists politically irrelevant. He outlined for a line of alternation between the DC and the left wing, represented by his party, due to the close relations between the PCI and the Soviet Union.

On the morning of 16 March 1978, the day on which the new cabinet led by Giulio Andreotti was supposed to have undergone a confidence vote in the Italian Parliament, the car of Aldo Moro, former prime minister and then president of DC was assaulted by a group of Red Brigades terrorists in Via Fani in Rome. Firing automatic weapons, the terrorists killed Moro's bodyguards and kidnapped him. Craxi was the only political leader, together with Amintore Fanfani and Marco Pannella, to declare himself available to a "humanitarian solution" that would allow the liberation of Christian Democrat statesman, drawing heavy criticism on the so-called "party of firmness", primarily driven by the Communists. On 9 May 1978 Moro's body was found in the trunk of a Renault 4 in Via Caetani after 55 days of imprisonment, during which Moro was submitted to a political trial by the so-called "people's court" set up by the Brigate Rosse and the Italian government was asked for an exchange of prisoners.

In 1978 Craxi decided to change the party logo. He chose a red carnation to represent the new course of the party, in honour of the Carnation Revolution in Portugal. The party shrank the size of the old hammer and sickle in the lower part of the symbol. It was eventually eliminated altogether in 1985.

In July 1978, following the resignation of President Giovanni Leone, after a lengthy parliamentary battle, Craxi was able to bring together a large number of votes, electing Sandro Pertini, as new president; Pertini was the first Socialist to hold this position. Pertini was also supported by the Communists, which considered the old Socialist partisan not conducive to the "new course" of Craxi.

Craxi, on the one hand explicitly distanced himself from Leninism referring to forms of authoritarian socialism, and on the other he showed support to the civil society movements and to the battles for civil rights, mainly proposed by the Radical Party, he oversaw its image through the media.

As the leader of PSI, he tried to undermine the Communist Party, which until then had been continuously increasing its votes in elections, and to consolidate the PSI as a modern, strongly pro-European reformist social-democratic party, with deep roots in the democratic left-wing. This strategy called for ending most of the party's historical traditions as a working-class trade union based party and attempting to gain new support among white-collar and public sector employees. At the same time, the PSI increased its presence in the big state-owned enterprises, and became heavily involved in corruption and illegal party funding which would eventually result in the Mani pulite investigations.

Even if the PSI never became a serious electoral challenger either to the PCI or the Christian Democrats, its pivotal position in the political arena allowed it to claim the post of Prime Minister for Craxi after the 1983 general election. The electoral support for the Christian Democrats was significantly weakened, leaving it with 32.9% of the vote, compared to the 38.3% it gained in 1979. The PSI, which had obtained only 11%, threatened to leave the parliamentary majority unless Craxi was made prime minister. The Christian Democrats accepted this compromise to avoid a new election. Craxi became the first Socialist in the history of the Italian Republic to be appointed prime minister, and the third member of a social democratic party in the history of unified Italy to hold the post.

== Prime Minister of Italy ==
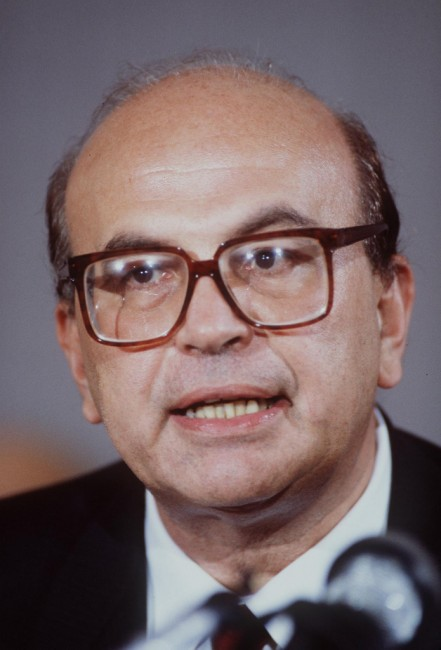
Craxi in 1987

Craxi led the one of longest-lived governments of Italy during the republican era and had strong influence in Italian politics throughout the 1980s; for a time, he was a close ally of two key figures of Christian Democracy, Giulio Andreotti and Arnaldo Forlani, in a loose cross-party alliance often dubbed CAF (from the first letter of the surname Craxi-Andreotti-Forlani). Craxi had a firm grasp on a party previously troubled by factionalism, and tried to distance it from the Communists and to bring it closer to Christian Democrats and other parties; his objective was to create an Italian version of European reformist socialist parties, like the German SPD or the French Socialist Party. The Italian Socialist Party reached its post-war apex when it increased its share of votes in the general election of 1987. However, the Italian Socialist Party never outgrew the much larger Italian Communist Party, whose highly charismatic leader, Enrico Berlinguer, was a fierce adversary of Craxi's policies through the years.

The main dynamic of Italian post-war politics was to find a way to keep the Italian Communist Party out of power. This led to the constant formation of political alliances between parties keen on keeping the Communists at bay. Things were further complicated by the fact that many parties had internal currents that would have welcomed the Communists in the governing coalition, in particular, within Christian Democracy, the largest party in Italy from 1945 until the end of the First Republic.

=== Domestic policy ===
During Craxi's tenure as prime minister, Italy became the fifth largest industrial nation and gained entry into the G7 Group of most industrialised nations. However, inflation was often in the double digits. Against trade union resistance, the Craxi government reacted by abolishing wage-price indexation (a mechanism known as scala mobile or "escalator"), under which wages had been increased automatically in line with inflation. Abolishing the escalator system did help reduce inflation, which was also falling in other major countries, but in the long term it inevitably increased industrial action as workers had to bargain for better salaries. In any event, the victory of the "No" campaign in the referendum called by the Italian Communist Party was a major victory for Craxi. During his premiership, the Socialist Party gained popularity. He successfully boosted the country's GNP and controlled inflation.

In domestic policy, a number of reforms were initiated during Craxi's time in office. In 1984, solidarity contracts (work-sharing arrangements to avoid redundancies) were introduced, while restrictions on part-time employment were relaxed. In the field of family welfare, legislation was enacted in 1984 and 1986 that changed the family allowance system "so that people most in need received larger amounts and coverage was progressively reduced to the point of termination once certain income levels were exceeded."

==== Concordat with the Vatican ====
In 1984, Craxi signed an agreement with the Vatican City State that revised the Lateran Treaty of 1929. Among other things, both sides declared: "The principle of the Catholic religion as the sole religion of the Italian State, originally referred to by the Lateran Pacts, shall be considered to be no longer in force". The Church's position as the sole state-supported religion of Italy was also ended, replacing the state financing with a personal income tax called the otto per mille, to which other religious groups, Christian and non-Christian, also have access.

The revised concordat regulated the conditions under which civil effects are accorded to church marriages and to ecclesiastical declarations of nullity of marriages. Abolished articles included those concerning state recognition of knighthoods and titles of nobility conferred by the Holy See, the undertaking by the Holy See to confer ecclesiastical honours on those authorized to perform religious functions at the request of the State or the Royal Household, and the obligation of the Holy See to enable the Italian government to present political objections to the proposed appointment of diocesan bishops.

Craxi was not a Catholic: he defined himself as a "laical Christian, like Giuseppe Garibaldi."

=== Foreign policy ===
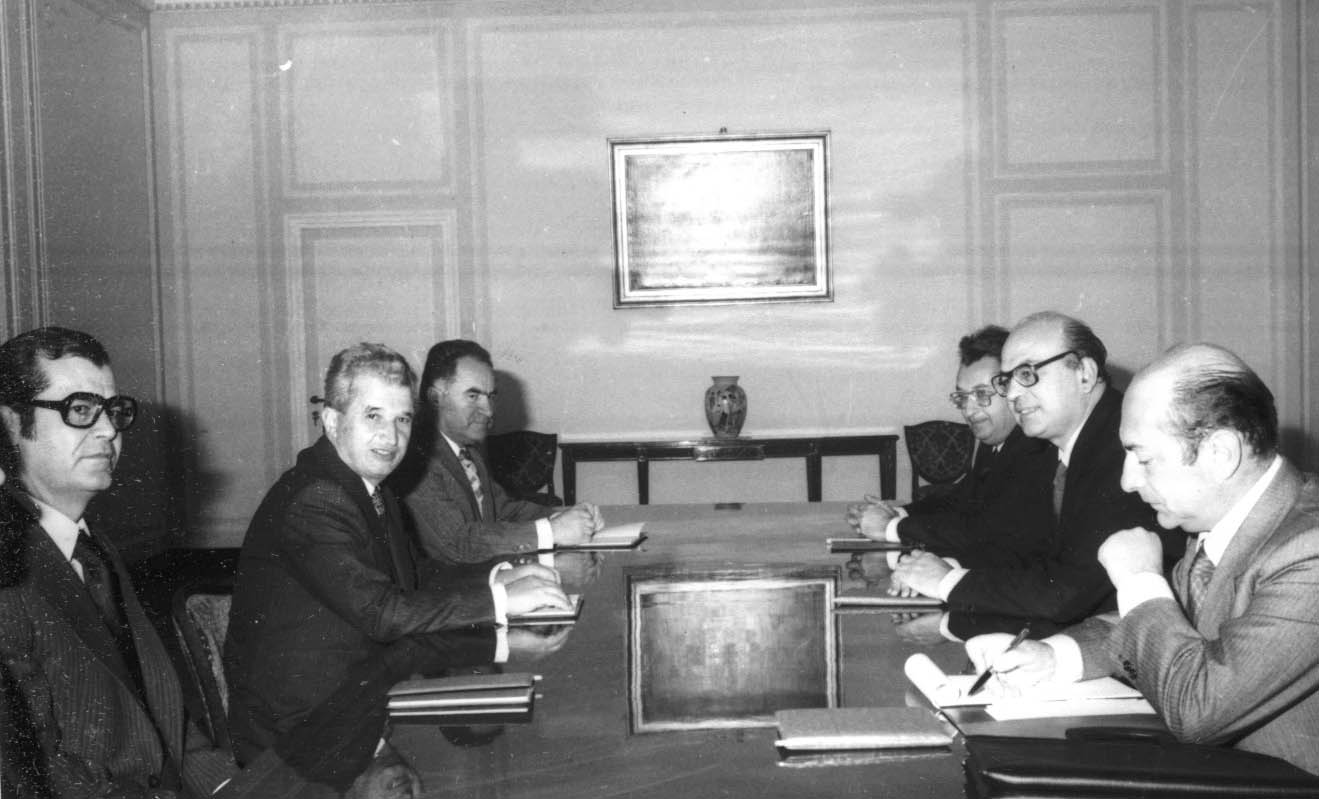
Craxi with Romanian President Nicolae Ceaușescu (1978)

In the international arena, Craxi helped dissidents and Socialist parties throughout the world to organise and become independent. Notable recipients of his logistical help were the Spanish Socialist Workers' Party (PSOE) during Francisco Franco's dictatorship and dramatist Jiři Pelikan, in the former Czechoslovakia. Rare footage of Craxi trying to lay flowers at the tomb of Salvador Allende has been unearthed from RAI's (Radiotelevisione Italiana) archives.

There is also evidence that part of Craxi's illegally earned money was given in secret to leftist political opposition in Uruguay during the military dictatorship, to Solidarity in the period of Jaruzelski rule in Poland and to Yasser Arafat and his Palestine Liberation Organization because of Craxi's sympathy for the Palestinian cause. He also played a role in the 1987 seizure of power in Tunisia by Zine el Abidine Ben Ali.

==== Sigonella crisis ====
Internationally, Craxi is perhaps best remembered for an incident in October 1985, when he refused the request of US president Ronald Reagan to extradite the hijackers of the cruise ship Achille Lauro. After protracted negotiations, the hijackers were given safe passage to Egypt by plane. Three United States Navy F-14's forced the plane down to the United States Naval Air Facility (NAF) of Sigonella. According to the version of political circles in Washington, Craxi first gave the United States Forces permission to detain the terrorists, but he later reneged on the deal. He ordered Italian troops to surround the US Forces protecting the plane.

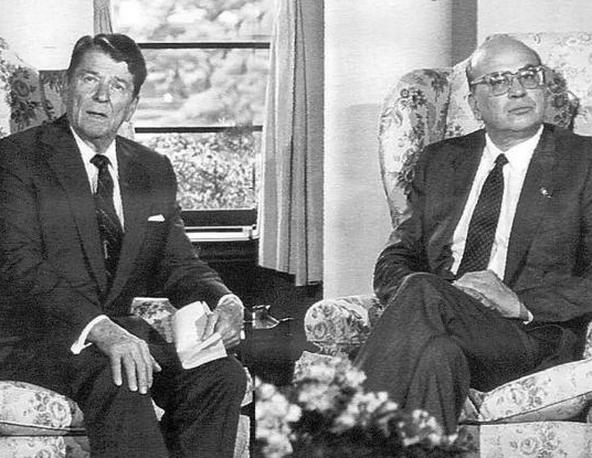
Craxi with the United States President Ronald Reagan

This move was supposedly dictated both by security concerns about terrorists targeting Italy if the United States had had it their way and by the Italian tradition of diplomacy with the Arab world. Craxi's decisive character may have been relevant in this resolution. Though the Americans demanded that the Italian authorities extradite Abu Abbas of the PLO, Craxi stood firm on the grounds that the crime had been perpetrated on Italian soil, over which the Italian Republic had sole jurisdiction. Craxi rejected the US extradition order and let Abu Abbas – chief of the hijackers, present on the plane – flee to Yugoslavia; the four hijackers were later found guilty, and sentenced to prison terms for hijacking and the murder of a Jewish American citizen, Leon Klinghoffer. Abbas was later also convicted in Italy in absentia and eventually died of natural causes, shortly after being taken prisoner by American forces in the aftermath of the 2003 invasion of Iraq. This episode earned Craxi an article in The Economist titled "Europe's strong man" and a standing ovation in the Senate of the Republic, which included his Communist opponents.

==== US attack on Libya ====
According to Giulio Andreotti, Italy's foreign minister at the time (and 42nd prime minister of Italy) and Abdel Rahman Shalgham (Libya's foreign minister from 2000 until 2009), Craxi was the person who telephoned Libyan leader Muammar al-Gaddafi to warn him of the impending American Operation El Dorado Canyon retaliatory air-strikes against Libya on 15 April 1986. This permitted Gaddafi and his family to evacuate their residence in the Bab al-Azizia compound moments before the bombs dropped. Shalgham's statement was also confirmed by Margherita Boniver, foreign affairs chief of Craxi's Socialist Party at the time.

For the Libyan attack, Craxi's government denied the United States any rights of military overflight, as did France and Spain. For the United States, this precluded the use of European continental bases, forcing the US Air Force component to take off from RAF Upper Heyford, United Kingdom, be flown around France and Spain, over Portugal and through the Straits of Gibraltar, adding 1,300 miles (2,100 km) each way and requiring multiple aerial refuellings.

=== Resignation ===
In April 1987, the Secretary of the Christian Democracy Ciriaco De Mita decided to drop his support for Craxi's government. This caused the immediate fall of the cabinet and the formation of a new government led by the long-time Christian Democratic politician Amintore Fanfani. Even though Fanfani was a close friend and ally, Craxi did not participate in the swearing in ceremony, sending the Undersecretary to the Presidency of the Council Giuliano Amato.

== After the premiership ==
In the 1987 general election the PSI won 14.3% of the vote, a good result but less good than what Craxi hoped, and this time it was the Christian Democrats' turn to govern. From 1987 to 1992 the PSI participated in four governments, allowing Giulio Andreotti to take power in 1989 and to govern until 1992. The Socialists held a strong balance of power, which made them more powerful than the Christian Democrats, who had to depend on it to form a majority in Parliament. The PSI kept tight control of this advantage.

The alternative which Craxi had wanted so much was taking shape: the idea of a "Social Unity" with the other left-wing political parties, including the PCI, proposed by Craxi in 1989 after the fall of communism. He believed that the collapse of communism in eastern Europe had undermined the PCI and made Social Unity inevitable. In fact, the PSI was in line to become Italy's second largest party and to become the dominant force of a new left-wing coalition opposed to a Christian Democrat-led one. This did not actually happen because of the rise of Lega Nord and the Tangentopoli scandals.

== Involvement in Tangentopoli ==
Craxi greeted by a salvo of coins as a sign of loathing by protesters

The last main turning point of Craxi's career began in February 1992, when Socialist MP Mario Chiesa was arrested by police while taking a 7 million lira bribe from a cleaning service firm. Chiesa sought Craxi's protection for nearly a month, but Craxi accused him of casting a shadow on the "most honest party in Italy". Feeling marginalised and unjustly singled out, Chiesa divulged everything he knew to the prosecutors. His revelations brought half of the Milan Socialists and industrialists under investigation; even Paolo Pillitteri, Craxi's own brother-in-law and mayor of Milan, was investigated despite his parliamentary immunity. As a consequence, a team of Milanese judges began investigating specifically the party's financing system.

In July 1992, Craxi finally realised the situation was serious and that he himself was going to be hit by the unfolding scandal. He made an appeal before the Chamber of Deputies in which he claimed that everyone knew of the widespread irregularities in the public financing of Italian parties, accused the deputies of hypocrisy and cowardice, and called for all MPs to protect the Socialists from prosecution as a show of solidarity. However, his call was ignored.

Craxi received his first prosecution notice in December 1992. More followed in January and February, at which point the Court of Milan explicitly asked Parliament to authorise Craxi's prosecution for bribery and corruption (at the time, Italian MPs were immune from prosecution unless authorised by Parliament). The authorisation was denied on 29 April 1993 after Craxi gave an emotional speech. However, upon coming out of the Hotel Raphael, where he lived, he received a salvo of coins that members of the Democratic Party of the Left and the right-wing Italian Social Movement threw at him as a sign of their disgust. From a traditional stadium chant, they started to jump and sing: "He who does not jump is a Socialist!" Some of the students waved 1,000-lire bills, singing "Bettino, do you want these too?" (Bettino, vuoi pure queste?) to the tune of Guantanamera.

=== Facing the judges ===
In December 1993, after his prosecution was finally authorised, Craxi was called to testify alongside Cristian Democracy (DC) party secretary Arnaldo Forlani before Justice Antonio Di Pietro. Questions were asked about the so-called ENIMONT 'super-bribe' which the PSI and DC had jointly received and democratically shared. Forlani evasively asked what a bribe was while Craxi, after admitting to the charges brought against himself and other parties, stated that the bribes were "the cost of politics." Craxi, noting that the legal process had accelerated in his case, claimed that his prosecution was politically motivated.

In May 1994, he fled to Tunis in order to escape jail. His political career ended in less than two years. Italy's entire political class, including people like Andreotti and Forlani, was to follow suit soon. The CAF (the Craxi-Andreotti-Forlani axis), which had made a pact to revive the Pentapartito (an alliance of five parties: DC, PSI, Italian Republican Party, Italian Liberal Party, Italian Democratic Socialist Party) of the 1980s and apply it to the 1990s, was doomed to be crushed by the popular vote as well as by the judges.

The set of anti-corruption investigations carried out by the Milan judges came to be collectively called Mani pulite (clean hands). No party was spared but in some parties, corruption had become more endemic than elsewhere, either because of more opportunity or internal ethics. To this day, some people, especially those who were close to Craxi argue that some parties like the Italian Communist Party (PCI) were left untouched, while the leaders of the ruling coalition and in particular Craxi were wiped off the political map.

The judges in Milan were put under scrutiny several times by different governments, especially Silvio Berlusconi's first government in 1994, but no evidence of any misconduct was ever found. Furthermore, public opinion was much less concerned about foreign financing than about the misappropriation of their money by corrupt politicians. In the end, the Socialist party went from 14% of the vote to a virtual nil. An ironic note was that the disgraced remnant of the party was excluded from Parliament by the minimum 4% threshold introduced by Craxi himself during one of his previous governments.

During the Mani pulite period, Craxi tried to use a daring defence tactic: he maintained that all parties needed and took money illegally, however they could get it, to finance their activities. His defence was therefore not to declare himself innocent, but everybody guilty. While this was basically the truth, most citizens distrusted politicians, and Craxi's defence got no sympathy from the citizens and may have even served to enrage them further. Some bribes didn't go to the parties at all. They went to the personal wallets of the politicians who happened to take them.

In 2012, Di Pietro admitted that Craxi was right when during the Enimont trials he accused the PCI to have received illegal funding from the Soviet Union. Craxi's sentences seemed to him "criminally relevant", but Di Pietro omitted to investigate that crime.

=== Criticism of his lifestyle ===
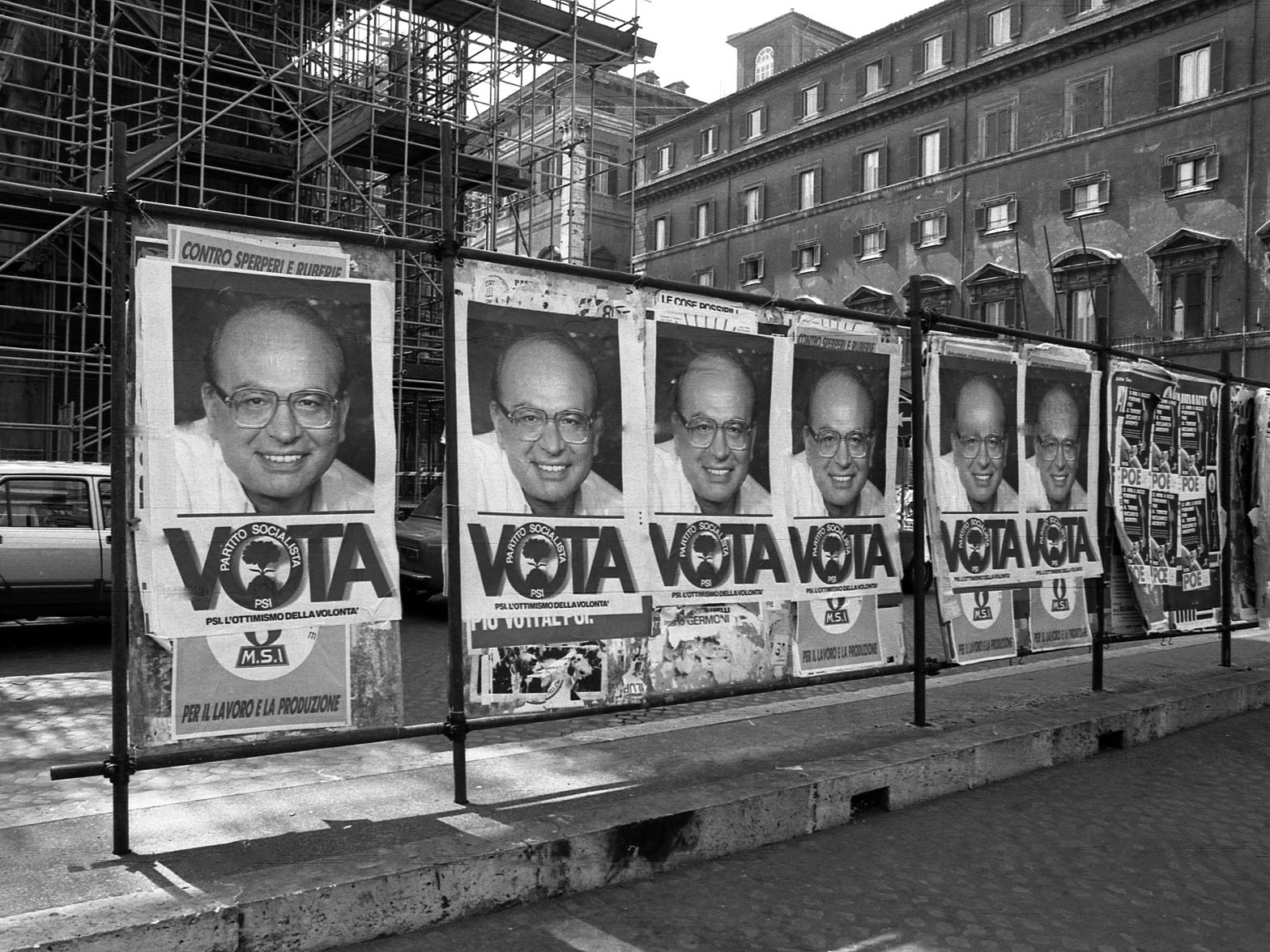
Electoral posters of the PSI showing a portrait of Craxi

Craxi's lifestyle was perceived to be inappropriate for the secretary of a party with so many alleged financial problems: he lived in the Raphael, an expensive hotel in Rome's centre, and had a large villa in Hammamet, Tunisia. As the Mani Pulite investigations were to uncover in the 1990s, personal corruption was endemic in Italian society; while many politicians, including Craxi, would justify corruption with the necessities of democracy, political leaders at many levels enjoyed a lifestyle that should have been well out of their reach, while most parties continued having financial problems. Rino Formica, a prominent member of the Socialist Party in those years, wittily said that "the convent is poor, but the friars are rich".

Furthermore, Craxi's arrogant character won him many enemies; one of his most condemned actions was blaming corruption in the socialist party on treasurer Vincenzo Balzamo, just after the latter's death, in order to clear himself of any accusation. Craxi's friends included Siad Barre, president of Somalia; Yasser Arafat, leader of PLO; and Ben Ali, president of Tunisia. The latter provided protection to Craxi when he escaped from Italy.

Craxi's entourage was famously criticised by Formica as a "court of midgets and dancers" (corte di nani e ballerine), indicating the often ludicrous and immoral traits of a system based on personal acquaintance rather than merit. Among the friends of Craxi's to receive smaller and larger favours, Silvio Berlusconi is perhaps the most known: he received many favours, especially regarding his media empire, and had a decree named after him ("Decreto Berlusconi") long before he entered politics. Other figures were Craxi's mistresses Ania Pieroni, who owned a TV station in the Rome area, and Sandra Milo, who had a skyrocketing career in the state-owned TV channels RAI.

Craxi was also known for never apologising, as a matter of principle; most Italians expected an apology after the corrupt system had been exposed. Craxi never apologised, stating he had done nothing that everybody else had not been doing, and that he was being unjustly singled out and persecuted.

=== Judgements of the European Court of Human Rights ===
All three appeals by Craxi to the Strasbourg court complained that his defence was not able to refute in court the accusations made by various defendants of related crimes, in violation of the adversarial principle proclaimed in article 6, paragraph 3, letter d of the European Convention of Human Rights. The European Court ruled in his favour in the case of wiretapped conversations illegally made public.

== Decline and dissolution of the PSI ==
Craxi resigned as party Secretary in February 1993. Between 1992 and 1993, most members of the party left politics and three Socialist deputies committed suicide. Craxi was succeeded by two Socialist trade unionists, first Giorgio Benvenuto and then by Ottaviano Del Turco. In the December 1993 provincial and municipal elections the PSI was virtually wiped out, receiving around 3% of the vote. In Milan, where the PSI had won 20% in 1990, the PSI received a mere 2%, which was not even enough to elect a councillor. Del Turco tried in vain to regain credibility for the party.

In the 1994 general election, what was left of PSI allied itself to the Alliance of Progressives dominated by the post-communist incarnation of the PCI, the Democratic Party of the Left (PDS). Del Turco quickly changed the party symbol to reinforce the idea of innovation. However, this did not stop the PSI gaining only 2.2% of the votes compared to 13.6% in 1992. The PSI got 16 deputies and 14 senators elected, down from 92 deputies and 49 senators of 1992. Most of them came from the left wing of the party, as Del Turco himself did. Most Socialists joined other political forces, mainly Forza Italia, the new party led by Silvio Berlusconi, the Patto Segni and Democratic Alliance.

The party was disbanded on 13 November 1994 after two years, in which almost all of its longtime leaders, especially Craxi, were involved in Tangentopoli and decided to leave politics. The 100-year-old party closed down, partially thanks to its leaders for their personalisation of the PSI.

== Craxism ==
Craxism (Italian: Craxismo) was and to some extent remains an Italian political ideology based on Craxi's thought. It was the informal ideology of the PSI from 1976 to 1994.

=== Origins and features ===
Although the term is considered derogatory today, Craxism was based on a synthesis of socialism, social democracy, and social liberalism, or the Italian liberal-socialist tradition. Under Craxi, the PSI supported Third-Worldism, was pro-Arab and environmentalist, and supported the modern welfare state, and was also pro-Atlanticist, pro-Europeanist, placed a strong defense of territorial sovereignty (e.g. the Sigonella crisis), and was more conservative on issues such as abortion and war on drugs.

Under Craxi, the PSI moved closer to the centre-left and political centre, much to ally with Christian Democracy and other moderate parties that formed a coalition called Pentapartito, which ensured a stable majority to govern.

=== Critics ===
Today, Craxism is often considered a derogatory term describing a corrupt politician, although some favourably welcome him; this is the case of those who, following the dissolution of the PSI, joined the newly formed Forza Italia of Silvio Berlusconi (centre-right coalition) but also a part of those who formed the Italian Socialists, small party adhering to the Alliance of Progressives of Achille Occhetto (centre-left coalition).

Craxism has led to the change of the whole of European socialism, together with Felipe González (PSOE), François Mitterrand (PS), and Helmut Schmidt (SPD) during the 1980s. In addition, along with these other figures, it inspired the overhaul and the policies of Tony Blair's Labour Party, José Luis Rodríguez Zapatero's PSOE, and Andreas Papandreou's PASOK.

In Italy, the main critics of Craxism, as well as the figure of Craxi, are the former Communists (including most members of the Democratic Party) and some left-leaning press media (Il Fatto Quotidiano, il manifesto, L'Espresso, and la Repubblica), while the biggest supporters are on the centre-left the refounded Italian Socialist Party of Riccardo Nencini, which includes his son Bobo Craxi, and various politicians of the centre-right like Berlusconi, Renato Brunetta, Maurizio Sacconi, and Stefano Caldoro, including his daughter, Stefania Craxi.

== Death and legacy ==
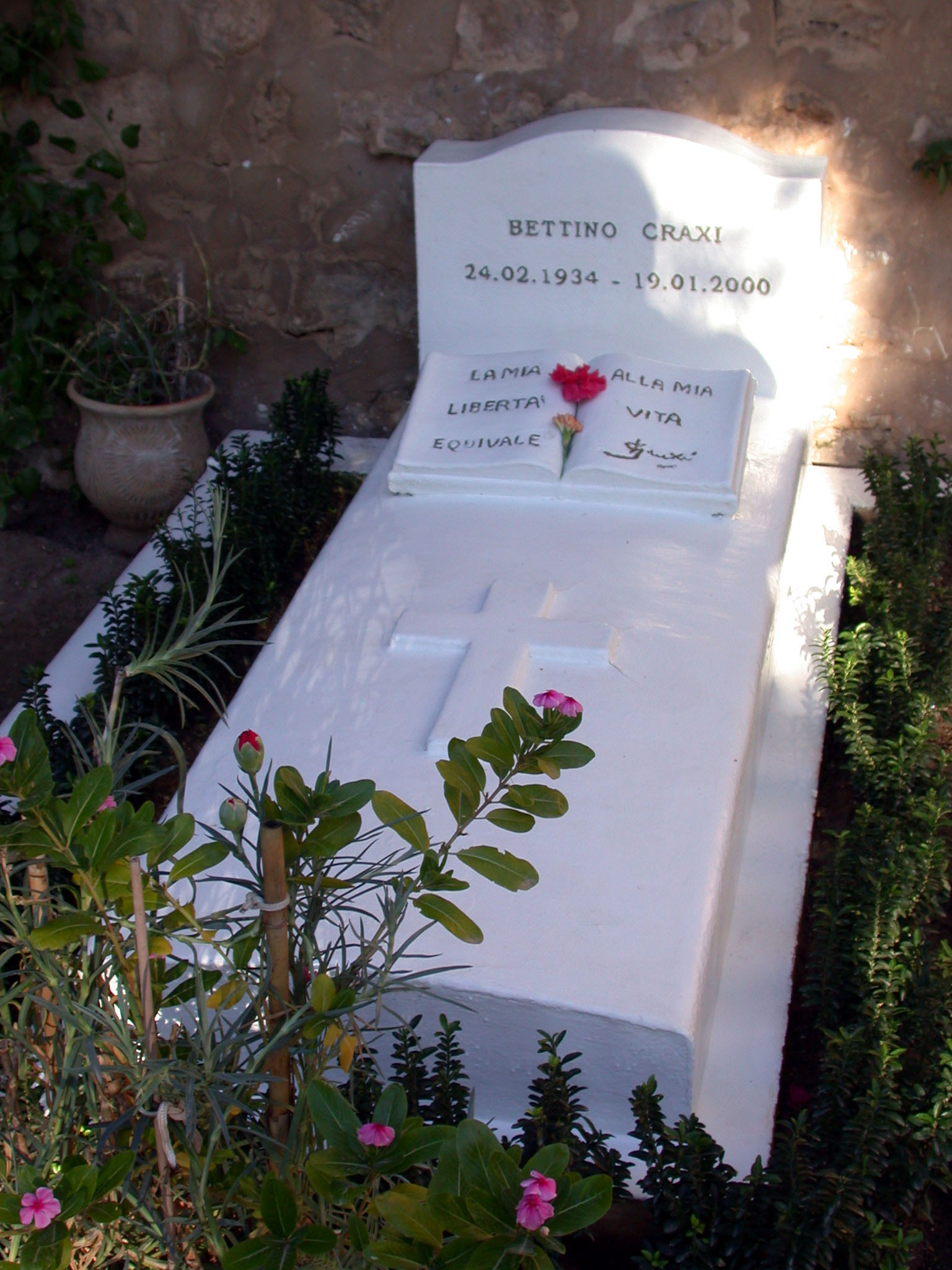
Craxi's grave in Hammamet, Tunisia

All this resulted in him being considered the symbol of political corruption. Craxi escaped the laws he had once contributed to make, by fleeing to Hammamet, Tunisia, in 1994; he remained a fugitive there, protected by the government of Zine El Abidine Ben Ali, his personal friend. He repeatedly declared himself innocent but never returned to Italy where he had been sentenced to 27 years in jail because of his corruption crimes; of these, 9 years and 8 months were upheld on appeal.

Craxi died on 19 January 2000, at the age of 65, from complications of diabetes. Prime Minister and Democrats of the Left leader Massimo D'Alema proposed a state funeral, which was not accepted by Craxi's family who accused the government of preventing his return to Italy to undergo a delicate surgery at San Raffaele Hospital in Milan.

Craxi's funeral took place at the Cathedral of St. Vincent de Paul in Tunis and saw a large participation of the local population. Former PSI militants and other Italians arrived in Tunisia to make the last greetings to their leader. His supporters came outside the Tunisian cathedral and targeted Lamberto Dini and Marco Minniti, representatives of the Italian government, with insults and a launch of coins. Craxi's tomb is in the small Christian cemetery in Hammamet. According to some sources it is orientated towards Italy; following a 2017 survey, this was revealed to be erroneous.

== Taxon named in his honor ==
Corythoichthys benedetto G. R. Allen & Erdmann, 2008, commonly known as Benedetto's pipefish, is a species of marine fish of the family Syngnathidae. It inhabits the Indo-West Pacific, near Thailand, Myanmar, Indonesia, Papua New Guinea, and Australia.

== Electoral history ==
Election	House	Constituency	Party	Votes	Result
1968	Chamber of Deputies	Milan–Pavia	PSI	23,788	Elected
1972	Chamber of Deputies	Milan–Pavia	PSI	23,704	Elected
1976	Chamber of Deputies	Milan–Pavia	PSI	36,992	Elected
1979	Chamber of Deputies	Milan–Pavia	PSI	65,350	Elected
1979	European Parliament	North-West Italy	PSI	286,739	Elected
1983	Chamber of Deputies	Naples–Caserta	PSI	124,833	Elected
1987	Chamber of Deputies	Naples–Caserta	PSI	165,676	Elected
1989	European Parliament	North-West Italy	PSI	473,414	Elected
1992	Chamber of Deputies	Milan–Pavia	PSI	94,226	Elected

Party political offices
Preceded by Francesco De Martino	Secretary of the Italian Socialist Party; 1976–1993	Succeeded by Giorgio Benvenuto
Political offices
Preceded by Amintore Fanfani	Prime Minister of Italy; 1983–1987	Succeeded by Amintore Fanfani
Preceded by Garret FitzGerald	President of the European Council; 1985	Succeeded by Jacques Santer
Diplomatic posts
Preceded by Yasuhiro Nakasone	Chair of the G7; 1987	Succeeded by Amintore Fanfani
