= 1994 Italian general election =

- 27–28 March 1994

All 630 seats in the Chamber of Deputies 316 seats needed for a majority All 315 elective seats in the Senate 163 seats needed for a majority (Note: This takes into account the Senators for life, which held 10 seats at the time the election took place.)
- Registered: 48,135,041 (C) · 41,795,730 (S)
- Turnout: 41,546,290 (C) · 86.3% (▼1.1 pp); 35,873,375 (S) · 85.8% (▼1.0 pp)
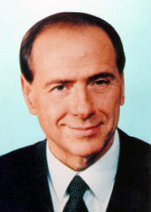

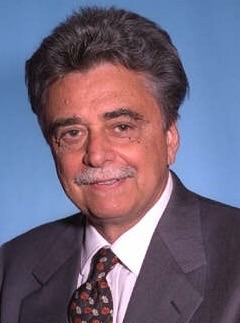

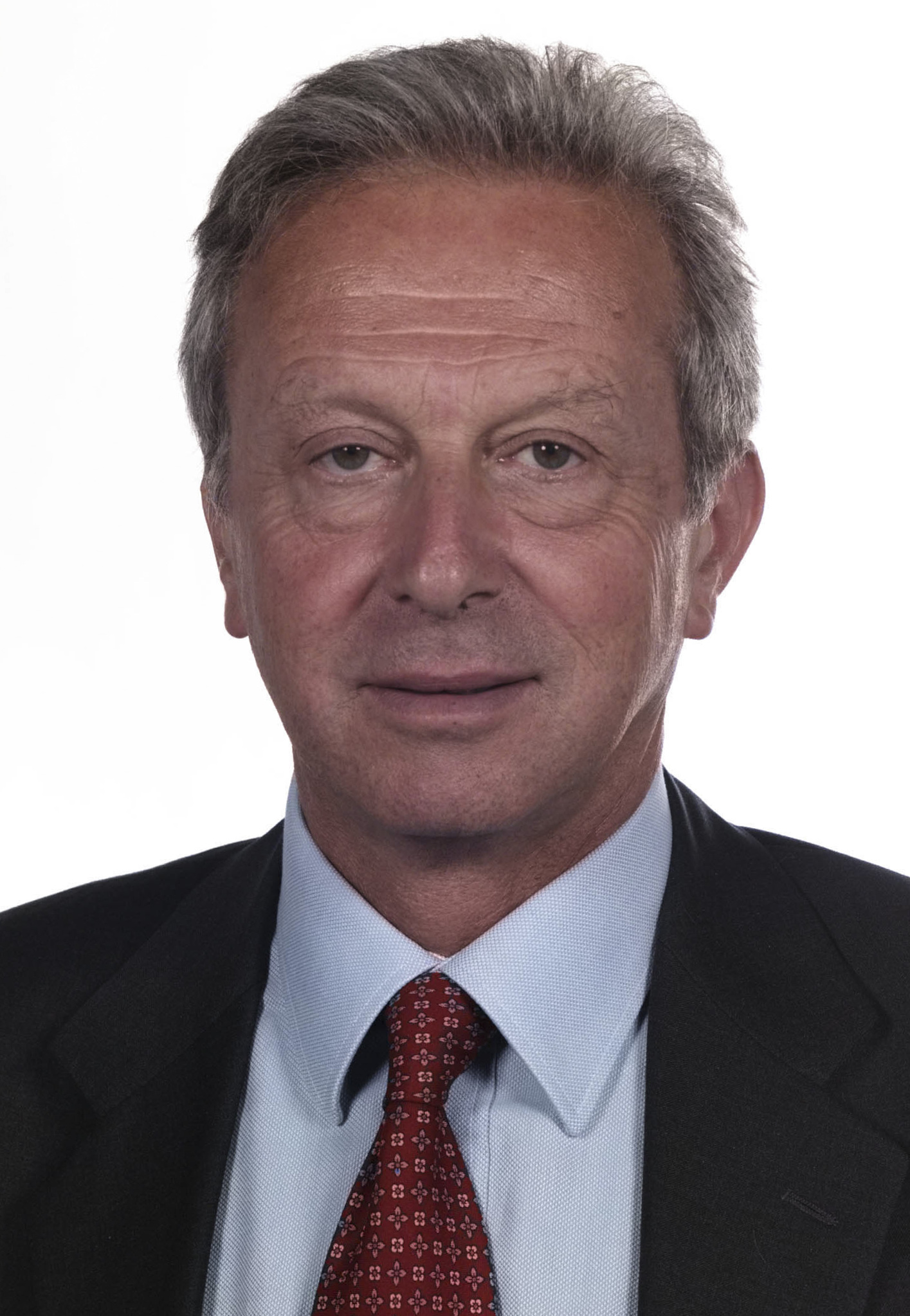
	First party	Second party	Third party
Leader	Silvio Berlusconi	Achille Occhetto	Mario Segni
Party	Forza Italia	PDS	Segni Pact
Alliance	Pole of Freedoms / Good Government	Progressives	Pact for Italy
Leader since	26 January 1994	1 February 1994	5 January 1994
Leader's seat	Roma Centrale (C)	Borgo Panigale (C)	Sardegna (C) (Note: Segni ran also in the single-member constituency of Sassari but he lost, being then elected in the closed list proportional representation system.)
Seats won	366 (C) / 156 (S)	213 (C) / 122 (S)	46 (C) / 31 (S)
Constituency vote	17,746,612 (C); 14,110,705 (S)	12.632,680 (C); 10,881,320 (S)	6,019,038 (C); 5,519,090 (S)
% and swing	46.1% (C); 42.6% (S)	32.8% (C); 32.9% (S)	15.6% (C); 16.7% (S)
Party vote	16,585,516 (C)	13,308,244 (C)	6,098,986 (C)
% and swing	42.8% (C)	34.3% (C)	15.8% (C)
- Results of the single-member constituencies in the Chamber of Deputies (left) and Senate (right).
Prime Minister before election
Carlo Azeglio Ciampi
Independent
Prime Minister after the election
Silvio Berlusconi
Forza Italia

The 1994 Italian general election was held on 27 and 28 March 1994 to elect members of the Chamber of Deputies and the Senate of the Republic for the 12th legislature. Silvio Berlusconi's centre-right coalition won a large majority in the Chamber of Deputies but just missed winning a majority in the Senate.

The Italian People's Party, the official heir of Christian Democracy party, which had dominated Italian politics for almost half a century, was decimated. It took only 29 seats versus 206 for the DC two years earlier—easily the worst defeat a sitting government in Italy has ever suffered, and one of the worst ever suffered by a Western European governing party.

== New electoral system ==
A new electoral system was introduced for these elections following the 1993 Italian referendum, which repealed the "supermajority clause" concerning Senate elections. Previously, this clause had effectively resulted in Senate elections being conducted using a system close to pure proportional representation.

Under the new system, 75% of the Senate seats were elected through a plurality voting system in single-member constituencies, while the remaining 25% were allocated proportionally in a compensatory manner. This reform significantly changed the structure of parliamentary elections by introducing a mixed electoral system.

Parliament also passed a new electoral law for the Chamber of Deputies in order to align it more closely with the Senate's electoral rules. Under this law, 75% of the seats were filled through plurality voting in single-member districts, while the remaining 25% were distributed proportionally using a supplementary system with a minimum electoral threshold of 4% of the vote.

The new electoral system became widely known as the Mattarellum, named after Sergio Mattarella, who was the main proponent of the reform.

== Background ==
In 1992, the five pro-Western governing parties (Christian Democracy, the Italian Socialist Party, the Italian Democratic Socialist Party, the Italian Republican Party, and the Italian Liberal Party) lost much of their electoral strength almost overnight due to a large number of judicial investigations concerning the financial corruption of many of their foremost members. This led to a general expectation that upcoming elections would be won by the Democratic Party of the Left, the heir of the former Italian Communist Party, and its Progressives coalition unless there was an alternative.

On 26 January 1994, the media magnate Silvio Berlusconi announced his decision to enter politics, ("enter the field", in his own words) presenting his own political party, Forza Italia, on a platform focused on defeating "the communists". His political aim was to convince the voters of the Pentapartito, the usual five governing parties who were shocked and confused by Mani Pulite scandals, that Forza Italia offered both novelty and the continuation of the pro-Western free-market policies followed by Italy since the end of World War II. Shortly after he decided to enter the political arena, investigators into the Mani Pulite affair were said to be close to issuing warrants for the arrest of Berlusconi and senior executives of his business group. During his years of political career, Berlusconi repeatedly stated that the Mani Pulite investigations were led by communist prosecutors who wanted to establish a Soviet-style government in Italy.

In order to win the election, Berlusconi formed two separate electoral alliances: the Pole of Freedoms (Polo delle Libertà) with the Northern League (Lega Nord) in northern Italian districts, and another, the Pole of Good Government (Polo del Buon Governo), with the post-fascist National Alliance (Alleanza Nazionale; heir to the neo-fascist Italian Social Movement), in central and southern regions. In a shrewd pragmatic move, he did not ally with the latter in the North because the League disliked them. As a result, Forza Italia was allied with two parties that were not allied with each other.

Berlusconi launched a massive campaign of electoral advertisements on his three TV networks. He subsequently won the election, with Forza Italia garnering 21% of the popular vote, the highest percentage of any single party, narrowly ahead of the Democratic Party of the Left, which finished less than 1% behind. One of the most significant promises that he made in order to secure victory was that his government would create "one million more jobs". On the other side, the center-left Progressives led by Achille Occhetto, also called "the Joyful War Machine", was composed by the two party born from the dissolution of the Italian Communist Party: the Democratic Party of the Left and Communist Refoundation Party. Since the alliance was sure of victory, its campaign was focused on criticizing the media power of Berlusconi.

== Main coalitions and parties ==
Coalition	Party	Main ideology	Seats			Party leader	Coalition leader
Coalition	Party	Main ideology	C	S	Total	Party leader	Coalition leader
Alliance of Progressives	Democratic Party of the Left (PDS)	Democratic socialism	106	65	171	Achille Occhetto	Achille Occhetto
Alliance of Progressives	Italian Socialist Party (PSI)	Social democracy	91	50	141	Ottaviano Del Turco	Achille Occhetto
Alliance of Progressives	Communist Refoundation Party (PRC)	Communism	33	20	53	Fausto Bertinotti	Achille Occhetto
Alliance of Progressives	Federation of the Greens (FdV)	Green politics	16	4	20	Carlo Ripa di Meana	Achille Occhetto
Alliance of Progressives	The Network (LR)	Anti-corruption politics	12	3	17	Leoluca Orlando	Achille Occhetto
Alliance of Progressives	Democratic Alliance (AD)	Social liberalism	—N/a	—N/a	—N/a	Willer Bordon	Achille Occhetto
Alliance of Progressives	Social Christians (CS) (Note: Running with the Democratic Party of the Left)	Christian left	—N/a	—N/a	—N/a	Pierre Carniti	Achille Occhetto
Alliance of Progressives	Socialist Rebirth (RS) (Note: Running with the Italian Socialist Party)	Social democracy	—N/a	—N/a	—N/a	Giorgio Benvenuto	Achille Occhetto
Pact for Italy	Italian People's Party (PPI)	Christian democracy	179	112	291	Mino Martinazzoli	Mario Segni
Pact for Italy	Segni Pact (PS)	Liberalism	—N/a	—N/a	—N/a	Mario Segni	Mario Segni
Pole of Freedoms – Pole of Good Government	Northern League (LN) (Note: Pole of Freedoms only)	Regionalism	50	25	75	Umberto Bossi	Silvio Berlusconi
Pole of Freedoms – Pole of Good Government	National Alliance (AN) (Note: Pole of Good Government only)	National conservatism	34	16	50	Gianfranco Fini	Silvio Berlusconi
Pole of Freedoms – Pole of Good Government	Christian Democratic Centre (CCD) (Note: Confederation with Forza Italia)	Christian democracy	24	0	24	Pier Ferdinando Casini	Silvio Berlusconi
Pole of Freedoms – Pole of Good Government	Forza Italia (FI)	Liberal conservatism	—N/a	—N/a	—N/a	Silvio Berlusconi	Silvio Berlusconi
Pole of Freedoms – Pole of Good Government	Union of the Centre (UdC)	Liberalism	—N/a	—N/a	—N/a	Raffaele Costa	Silvio Berlusconi
Pole of Freedoms – Pole of Good Government	Liberal Democratic Pole (PLD)	Liberalism	—N/a	—N/a	—N/a	Adriano Teso	Silvio Berlusconi
Pannella List (LP)		Libertarianism	6	0	6	Marco Pannella	

== Results ==
Berlusconi's alliance won a decisive victory over the Progressives, becoming the first centre-right coalition to win a general election in Italy since the end of the Second World War. Berlusconi's coalition won in the main regions of Italy: the strongest parties in Northern Italy were the regionalist Northern League and Forza Italia, which was also able to win in all provinces of Sicily, while the National Alliance received more votes in Southern Italy. The Alliance of Progressives confirmed its predominance in the Red Belt regions of Central Italy, and in the South.

=== Chamber of Deputies ===
==== Overall results ====
← Summary of the 27 March 1994 Chamber of Deputies election results →
Coalition	Party	Proportional			First-past-the-post			Total seats	+/–
Coalition	Party	Votes	%	Seats	Votes	%	Seats	Total seats	+/–
Pole of Freedoms – Pole of Good Government	Forza Italia (FI)	8,136,135	21.01	30 (Note: 6 out of the 30 MPs elected on the Forza Italia list were members of the Christian Democratic Centre.)	17,746,612	46.09	87	111 (Note: Including 6 deputies of the Reformers, 4 deputies of the Union of the Centre (UdC) and 2 deputies of the Liberal Democratic Pole (PLD).)	New
Pole of Freedoms – Pole of Good Government	Christian Democratic Centre (CCD)	8,136,135	21.01	30	17,746,612	46.09	21	27	New
Pole of Freedoms – Pole of Good Government	National Alliance (AN)	5,214,133	13.47	23 (Note: Emiddio Novi, elected in Campania for National Alliance, was member of Forza Italia, and he joined his party after the election.)	17,746,612	46.09	87	110	+75
Pole of Freedoms – Pole of Good Government	Northern League (LN)	3,235,248	8.36	11 (Note: Andrea Merlotti, elected in Lombardy for the Northern League, was member of Forza Italia, and he joined his party after the election.)	17,746,612	46.09	107	118	+62
Pole of Freedoms – Pole of Good Government	Total seats			64			302	366	–
Alliance of Progressives	Democratic Party of the Left (PDS)	7,881,646	20.36	38 (Note: Fabiano Crucianelli, elected in Latium for the PDS, was member of the Communist Refoundation Party, and he joined his party after the election.)	12.632,680	32.81	87	125 (Note: Including 8 deputies of the Social Christians party.)	+17
Alliance of Progressives	Communist Refoundation Party (PRC)	2,343,946	6.05	11	12.632,680	32.81	27	38	+4
Alliance of Progressives	Federation of the Greens (FdV)	1,047,268	2.70	0	12.632,680	32.81	11	11	−5
Alliance of Progressives	Italian Socialist Party (PSI)	849,429	2.19	0	12.632,680	32.81	15	15 (Note: Including 1 deputy of the Socialist Rebirth.)	−77
Alliance of Progressives	The Network (LR)	719,841	1.86	0	12.632,680	32.81	8	8	−4
Alliance of Progressives	Democratic Alliance (AD)	456,114	1.18	0	12.632,680	32.81	16	16	New
Alliance of Progressives	Total seats			49			164	213	–
Pact for Italy	Italian People's Party (PPI)	4,287,172	11.07	29	6,019,038	15.63	4	33	−146
Pact for Italy	Segni Pact (PS)	1,811,814	4.68	13	6,019,038	15.63	0	13	New
Pact for Italy	Total seats			42			4	46	–
South Tyrolean People's Party (SVP)		231,842	0.60	0	188,017	0.49	3	3	±0
Southern Action League (LAM)		59,873	0.15	0	46,820	0.13	1	1	+1
Aosta Valley (VdA)		—N/a	—N/a	0	43,700	0.11	1	1	±0
Total								630	–

==== Detailed results ====
First-past-the-post
Party or coalition	Votes	%	Seats
Alliance of Progressives (AdP)	12,632,680	32.81	164
Pole of Freedoms (PdL)	8,767,720	22.77	164
Pact for Italy (PpI)	6,019,038	15.63	4
Pole of Good Government (PdBG)	5,732,890	14.89	129
National Alliance (AN)	2,566,848	6.67	8
Forza Italia (FI)	679,154	1.76	1
Pannella List (LP)	432,667	1.12	0
South Tyrolean People's Party (SVP)	188,017	0.49	3
Social Democracy for the Freedoms (PSDI–FDS)	147,493	0.38	0
Southern Action League (LAM)	46,820	0.13	1
Aosta Valley (VdA)	43,700	0.11	1
Others	1,247,131	3.24	0
Total	38,504,158	100.00	475
Source: Ministry of the Interior

Proportional
Party	Votes	%	Seats
Forza Italia (FI)	8,136,135	21.01	30
Democratic Party of the Left (PDS)	7,881,646	20.36	38
National Alliance (AN)	5,214,133	13.47	23
Italian People's Party (PPI)	4,287,172	11.07	29
Northern League (LN)	3,235,248	8.36	11
Communist Refoundation Party (PRC)	2,343,946	6.05	11
Segni Pact (PS)	1,811,814	4.68	13
Pannella List (LP)	1,359,283	3.51	0
Federation of the Greens (FdV)	1,047,268	2.70	0
Italian Socialist Party (PSI)	849,429	2.19	0
The Network (LR)	719,841	1.86	0
Democratic Alliance (AD)	456,114	1.18	0
South Tyrolean People's Party (SVP)	231,842	0.60	0
Social Democracy for Freedoms (PSDI–FDS)	179,495	0.46	0
Program Italy (PI)	151,328	0.39	0
Lombard Alpine League (LAL)	136,782	0.35	0
Venetian Autonomy League (LAV)	103,764	0.27	0
Southern Action League (LAM)	59,873	0.15	0
Others	517,780	1.34	0
Total	38,720,893	100.00	155
Source: Ministry of the Interior

Popular vote (first-past-the-post)
AdP	32.81%
PdL	22.77%
PpI	15.63%
PdBG	14.89%
AN	6.67%
FI	1.76%
Pannella	1.12%
Others	4.35%

Popular vote (proportional)
FI–CCD	21.01%
PDS	20.36%
AN	13.47%
PPI	11.07%
LN	8.36%
PRC	6.05%
Segni	4.68%
Pannella	3.51%
FdV	2.70%
PSI	2.19%
Rete	1.86%
AD	1.18%
Others	3.56%

==== FPTP results by constituency ====
Constituency	Total seats	Seats won			
Constituency	Total seats	PdL – PBG	AdP	PpI	Others
Abruzzo	11	1	10		
Aosta Valley	1				1
Apulia	34	23	10		1
Basilicata	5	1	4		
Calabria	17	7	10		
Campania 1	25	10	15		
Campania 2	22	7	12	3	
Emilia-Romagna	32	3	29		
Friuli-Venezia Giulia	10	10			
Lazio 1	32	29	3		
Lazio 2	11	11			
Liguria	14	7	7		
Lombardy 1	31	31			
Lombardy 2	32	32			
Lombardy 3	11	10	1		
Marche	12		12		
Molise	3	2	1		
Piedmont 1	19	14	5		
Piedmont 2	17	17			
Sardinia	14	9	4	1	
Sicily 1	20	16	4		
Sicily 2	21	21			
Trentino-Alto Adige	8	5			3
Tuscany	29		29		
Umbria	7		7		
Veneto 1	22	22			
Veneto 2	15	14	1		
Total	475	302	164	4	5

==== PR results by constituency ====
Constituency	Total seats	Seats won		
Constituency	Total seats	PdL – PBG	AdP	PpI
Abruzzo	3	2		1
Apulia	10	1	5	4
Basilicata	2	1		1
Calabria	6	2	2	2
Campania 1	8	4	2	2
Campania 2	7	4	1	2
Emilia-Romagna	9	4	4	1
Friuli-Venezia Giulia	3	1	1	1
Lazio 1	10	1	6	3
Lazio 2	3	1	1	1
Liguria	6	3	2	1
Lombardy 1	10	4	4	2
Lombardy 2	11	5	3	3
Lombardy 3	4	2	1	1
Marche	4	2	1	1
Molise	1			1
Piedmont 1	6	3	2	1
Piedmont 2	6	3	2	1
Sardinia	4	1	1	2
Sicily 1	7	3	2	2
Sicily 2	7	3	2	2
Trentino-Alto Adige	2	1		1
Tuscany	11	5	4	2
Umbria	2	2		
Veneto 1	8	3	2	3
Veneto 2	5	3	1	1
Total	155	64	49	42

=== Senate of the Republic ===
==== Overall results ====
← Summary of the 27 March 1994 Senate of the Republic election results →
Coalition	Party	First-past-the-post			Proportional seats	Total seats	+/–
Coalition	Party	Votes	%	Seats	Proportional seats	Total seats	+/–
Pole of Freedoms – Pole of Good Government	Northern League (LN)	13,342,940 (Note: 6,570,468 votes for the Pole of Freedoms (in Northern Italy), 4,544,573 votes for the Pole of Good Government (in Southern Italy), 2,077,934 votes for National Alliance (in Northern Italy) and 149,965 votes for Forza Italia–CCD (in Abruzzo))	40.34 (Note: 19.87% of the votes for the Pole of Freedoms, 13.74% of the votes for the Pole of Good Government, 6.28% of the votes for National Alliance and 0.45% of the votes for Forza Italia–CCD)	128	28	60	+35
Pole of Freedoms – Pole of Good Government	National Alliance (AN)	13,342,940	40.34	128	28	48	+32
Pole of Freedoms – Pole of Good Government	Forza Italia (FI)	13,342,940	40.34	128	28	36 (Note: Including 2 senators of the Union of the Centre and 1 senator of the Reformers.)	New
Pole of Freedoms – Pole of Good Government	Christian Democratic Centre (CCD)	13,342,940	40.34	128	28	12	New
Pole of Freedoms – Pole of Good Government	Total seats					156	–
Alliance of Progressives	Democratic Party of the Left (PDS)	10,881,320	32.90	96	26	76 (Note: Including 6 senators of the Social Christians party.)	+12
Alliance of Progressives	Communist Refoundation Party (PRC)	10,881,320	32.90	96	26	18	−2
Alliance of Progressives	Italian Socialist Party (PSI)	10,881,320	32.90	96	26	9 (Note: Including 1 senator of the Socialist Rebirth.)	−40
Alliance of Progressives	Federation of the Greens (FdV)	10,881,320	32.90	96	26	7	+3
Alliance of Progressives	Democratic Alliance (AD)	10,881,320	32.90	96	26	6	New
Alliance of Progressives	The Network (LR)	10,881,320	32.90	96	26	6	+3
Alliance of Progressives	Total seats					122	–
Pact for Italy (PpI)		5,519,090	16.69	3	28	31	−64
Pannella List (LP)		767,765	2.32	0	1	1	+1
Lombard Alpine League (LAL)		246,046	0.74	0	1	1	±0
South Tyrolean People's Party (SVP)		217,137	0.66	3	0	3	±0
Magris List (Magris)		61,400	0.19	1	0	1	New
Aosta Valley (VdA)		27,493	0.08	1	0	1	±0
Total						315	–

==== Detailed results ====
Party or coalition	Votes	%	Seats	
Party or coalition	Votes	%	FPTP	Proportional
Alliance of Progressives (AdP)	10,881,320	32.90	96	26
Pole of Freedoms (PdL)	6,570,468	19.87	74	8
Pact for Italy (PpI)	5,519,090	16.69	3	28
Pole of Good Government (PBG)	4,544,573	13.74	56	19
National Alliance (AN)	2,077,934	6.28	0	8
Pannella List (LP)	767,765	2.32	0	1
Pensioners' Party (PP)	250,637	0.76	0	0
Lombard Alpine League (LAL)	246,046	0.74	0	1
South Tyrolean People's Party (SVP)	217,137	0.66	3	0
Venetian Autonomy League (LAV)	165,370	0.50	0	0
Federalist Greens (VF)	100,418	0.30	0	0
Sardinian Action Party (PSd'Az)	88,225	0.27	0	0
Natural Law Party (PLN)	86,579	0.26	0	0
Social Democracy for Freedoms (PSDI–FDS)	80,264	0.24	0	0
The League of Angela Bossi	72,455	0.22	0	0
Greens Greens (VV)	68,218	0.21	0	0
Veneto Autonomous Region Movement (MVRA)	64,149	0.19	0	0
Magris List (Magris)	61,400	0.19	1	0
Southern Action League (LAM)	54,395	0.16	0	0
League for Piedmont	49,505	0.15	0	0
Aosta Valley (VdA)	27,493	0.08	1	0
Others	931,143	2.82	0	0
Total	33,074,549	100.00	232	83
Source: Ministry of the Interior

Popular vote
AdP	32.90%
PdL	19.87%
PpI	16.69%
PBG	13.74%
AN	6.28%
Pannella	2.32%
Others	8.20%

==== FPTP by constituency ====
Constituency	Total seats	Seats won			
Constituency	Total seats	PdL–PBG	AdP	PpI	Others
Piedmont	17	12	5		
Aosta Valley	1				1
Lombardy	35	35			
Trentino-Alto Adige	6	3			3
Veneto	17	17			
Friuli-Venezia Giulia	5	4			1
Liguria	6	2	4		
Emilia-Romagna	15	1	14		
Tuscany	14		14		
Umbria	5		5		
Marche	6		6		
Lazio	21	16	5		
Abruzzo	5		5		
Molise	2		2		
Campania	22	7	13	2	
Apulia	16	9	7		
Basilicata	5	1	4		
Calabria	8	1	7		
Sicily	20	17	3		
Sardinia	6	3	2	1	
Total	232	128	96	3	5

==== PR results by constituency ====
Constituency	Total seats	Seats won			
Constituency	Total seats	PpI	PdL–PBG	AdP	Others
Piedmont	6	2	2	2	
Lombardy	12	3	1	6	2
Trentino-Alto Adige	1	1			
Veneto	6	2	1	3	
Friuli-Venezia Giulia	2	1		1	
Liguria	3	1	2		
Emilia-Romagna	6	2	4		
Tuscany	5	2	3		
Umbria	2	1	1		
Marche	2	1	1		
Lazio	7	2	1	4	
Abruzzo	2		2		
Campania	8	3	3	2	
Apulia	6	2	2	2	
Basilicata	2	1	1		
Calabria	3	1	2		
Sicily	7	2		5	
Sardinia	3	1	1	1	
Total	83	28	27	26	2

=== Leaders' races ===
1994 Italian general election (C): Rome Centre
Candidate	Coalition	Party	Votes	%
Silvio Berlusconi	Pole	FI	34,354	46.29
Luigi Spaventa	Progressives	PDS	29,914	40.10
Alberto Michelini	Pact for Italy	PS	9,566	12.82
Others			593	0.79
Total			74,607	100.0
Turnout			77,562	77.19
Pole gain				
Source: Ministry of the Interior

1994 Italian general election (C): Bologna – Borgo Panigale
Candidate	Coalition	Party	Votes	%
Achille Occhetto	Progressives	PDS	52,997	59.77
Pier Ferdinando Casini	Pole	CCD	17,925	20.22
Alfredo Ruocco	None	AN	7,388	8.33
Maria Gualandi	Pact for Italy	PPI	7,133	8.04
Oliviero Toscani	None	LP	3,225	3.64
Total			88,668	100.0
Turnout			91,571	95.03
Progressives gain				
Source: Ministry of the Interior

1994 Italian general election (C): Sassari
Candidate	Coalition	Party	Votes	%
Carmelo Porcu	Pole	AN	30,623	36.14
Mario Segni	Pact for Italy	PS	26,776	31.60
Gavino Angius	Progressives	PDS	17,570	20.73
Giacomo Spissu	None	PSd'Az	6,952	8.20
Gavino Sale	None	ParIS	1,185	1.40
Giovanni Conoci	None	LR	966	1.14
Others			664	0.78
Total			84,736	100.0
Turnout			89,504	86.02
Pole gain				
Source: Ministry of the Interior

== Aftermath ==
Contrary to its success in the Chamber of Deputies, the Pole failed to win a majority in the Senate. Nevertheless, the first Berlusconi government obtained a vote of confidence in the Senate thanks to the abstention of four PPI senators (Vittorio Cecchi Gori, Stefano Cusumano, Luigi Grillo, and Tomaso Zanoletti), who decided not to take part in the vote. The vote of the Senators for life was not decisive, as three (Gianni Agnelli, Francesco Cossiga, and Giovanni Leone) voted in favour of the government, three were absent (Carlo Bo, Norberto Bobbio, and Amintore Fanfani) and five voted against (Giulio Andreotti, Francesco De Martino, Giovanni Spadolini, Paolo Emilio Taviani, and Leo Valiani). As a result, the Senate gave Berlusconi 159 votes in favour and 153 against.

Commenting on the historical significance of Berlusconi's victory, together with the complexity of his alliance, the British historian Martin Clark observed: "It was an extraordinary transformation: 70 per cent of the deputies and senators won seats for the first time. The corrupt old parties were replaced by a 'new Right': 97 businessmen and media executives of FI, 122 small businessmen and artisans of the League, bent on a Sack of Rome, and 109 'post-Fascists,' advocates prominent among them, desperate to preserve 'Italy' from the League and social spending from the free marketeers."

== See also ==
- Politics of Italy
- History of the Italian Republic#Second Republic (1992–present)
