= Basilicata (Chamber of Deputies constituency) =

- Chamber of Deputies; Electoral constituency
- Region: Basilicata
- Electorate: 446,685 (2022)
- Major settlements: Matera, Potenza

Current constituency
- Created: 1993
- Seats: 4
- Members: M5S (1); PD (1); FdI (2)

Basilicata is one of the 29 constituencies (Italian: circoscrizioni) represented in the Chamber of Deputies, the lower house of the Italian parliament. The constituency currently elects 4 deputies. Its boundaries correspond to those of the Italian region of Basilicata. The electoral system uses a parallel voting system, which act as a mixed system, with 3/8 of seats allocated using a first-past-the-post electoral system and 5/8 using a proportional method, with one round of voting.

The constituency was first established by the Mattarella law on 4 August 1993 and later confirmed by the Calderoli law on 21 December 2005 and by the Rosato law on 3 November 2017. The current borders of the districts were created as a result of the 2020 Italian Constitutional Referendum

== Members of the Parliament ==
=== 2022-Present ===
Single-member districts
District			Deputy	Party	Ref
N.	Name	Map	Deputy	Party	Ref
01	Potenza		Salvatore Caiata	Brothers of Italy	

Multi-member districts
District			Party	Deputy	Ref
N.	Name	Map	Party	Deputy	Ref
01	Basilicata		Democratic Party	Vincenzo Amendola	
01	Basilicata		Five Star Movement	Arnaldo Lomuti	
01	Basilicata		Brothers of Italy	Aldo Mattia	

=== 2018–2022 ===
Single-member districts
District			Deputy	Party
N.	Name	Map	Deputy	Party
01	Potenza		Salvatore Caiata	Five Star Movement
02	Matera		Gianluca Rospi	Five Star Movement

Multi-member districts
District			Party	Deputy
N.	Name	Map	Party	Deputy
01	Basilicata – 01		Five Star Movement	Mirella Liuzzi
01	Basilicata – 01		Five Star Movement	Luciano Cillis
01	Basilicata – 01		Democratic Party	Vito De Filippo
01	Basilicata – 01		Forza Italia	Michele Casino
