= Socialist Rebirth =

Italian political party

Socialist Rebirth Rinascita Socialista
- Leader: Giorgio Benvenuto (1993); Vincenzo Mattina (1993–95)
- Founded: 1993
- Dissolved: 1995
- Split from: Italian Socialist Party
- Merged into: Labour Federation
- Ideology: Social democracy
- Political position: Centre-left
- National affiliation: Alliance of Progressives

Socialist Rebirth (Italian: Rinascita Socialista) was a minor social-democratic political party in Italy. The group was founded in 1993 from a split from the Italian Socialist Party (PSI) led by Giorgio Benvenuto, who contested the continuing PSI led by Ottaviano Del Turco which had lost a lot of electors. The RS and PSI were both members of the Alliance of Progressives coalition of centre-left parties formed to contest the 1994 general election. In 1995, RS merged into the Labour Federation, which itself merged into Democrats of the Left in 1998.
