= 1999 European Parliament election in Italy =

- 13 June 1999
- All 87 Italian seats to the European Parliament
- Turnout: 69,73 (▼3.87 pp)
Party	Leader	Vote %	Seats	+/–
FI	Silvio Berlusconi	25.2%	22	−5
DS	Walter Veltroni	17.3%	15	−1
AN–PS	Gianfranco Fini	10.3%	9	−5
Bonino List	Emma Bonino	8.5%	7	+5
Democrats	Romano Prodi	7.7%	6	New
LN	Umberto Bossi	4.5%	4	−2
PRC	Fausto Bertinotti	4.3%	4	−1
PPI	Franco Marini	4.2%	4	−4
CCD	Pier Ferdinando Casini	2.6%	2	New
SDI	Enrico Boselli	2.2%	2	0
CDU	Rocco Buttiglione	2.2%	2	New
PdCI	Armando Cossutta	2.0%	2	New
Greens	Grazia Francescato	1.8%	2	−1
UDEUR	Clemente Mastella	1.6%	1	New
MSFT	Pino Rauti	1.6%	1	New
RI	Lamberto Dini	1.1%	1	New
Pensioners	Carlo Fatuzzo	0.8%	1	New
PRI	Giorgio La Malfa	0.5%	1	0
SVP	Siegfried Brugger	0.5%	1	0
This lists parties that won seats. See the complete results below.
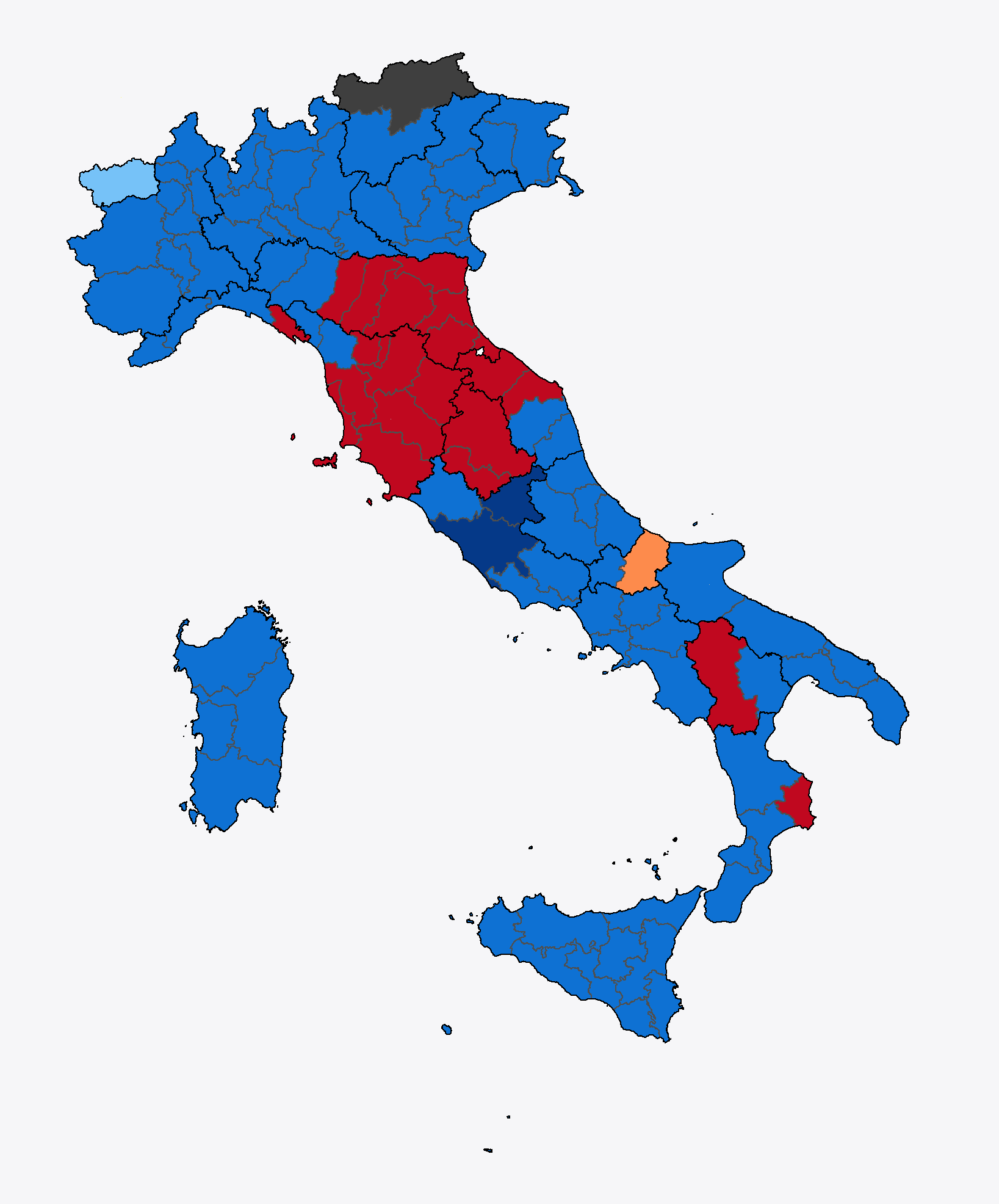
Major party in each province

The 1999 European Parliament election in Italy was the election of the delegation from Italy to the European Parliament in 1999.

== Electoral system ==
The pure party-list proportional representation was the traditional electoral system of the Italian Republic since its foundation in 1946, so it had been adopted to elect the Italian representatives to the European Parliament too. Two levels were used: a national level to divide seats between parties, and a constituency level to distribute them between candidates. Italian regions were united in 5 constituencies, each electing a group of deputies. At national level, seats were divided between party lists using the largest remainder method with Hare quota. All seats gained by each party were automatically distributed to their local open lists and their most voted candidates.

=== Constituencies ===
Seats are allocated to party lists on a national basis using an electoral quota, with the residue given to the lists with the largest excess over whole quotas. An electoral quota is then calculated for each list and used to allocate seats to each list in each of the five electoral regions.

Electoral Region	Administrative Regions	Seats
North-West	Aosta Valley, Liguria, Lombardy, Piedmont	26
North-East	Emilia-Romagna, Friuli-Venezia Giulia, Trentino-Alto Adige/Südtirol, Veneto	16
Central	Latium, Marche, Tuscany, Umbria	18
Southern	Abruzzo, Apulia, Basilicata, Calabria, Campania, Molise	21
Islands	Sardinia, Sicily	6

== Main parties and leaders ==
=== Outgoing MEPs ===
EP Group	Seats	Party	MEPs
European People's Party Group	40 / 87		
European People's Party Group	40 / 87	Forza Italia	25
European People's Party Group	40 / 87	Italian People's Party	8
European People's Party Group	40 / 87	Segni Pact	3
European People's Party Group	40 / 87	Christian Democratic Centre	2
European People's Party Group	40 / 87	South Tyrolean People's Party	1
European People's Party Group	40 / 87	Democratic Union for the Republic	1
Socialist Group	19 / 87		
Socialist Group	19 / 87	Democrats of the Left	16
Socialist Group	19 / 87	Italian Democratic Socialists	2
Socialist Group	19 / 87	Movement of Unitarian Communists	1
European United Left/Nordic Green Left	5 / 87		
European United Left/Nordic Green Left	5 / 87	Communist Refoundation Party	4
European United Left/Nordic Green Left	5 / 87	Independent	1
Green Group	3 / 87		
Green Group	3 / 87	Federation of the Greens	2
Green Group	3 / 87	The Network	1
European Radical Alliance	2 / 87	Pannella List	2
European Liberal Democrat and Reform Party Group	1 / 87		
European Liberal Democrat and Reform Party Group	1 / 87	Italian Republican Party	1
Union for Europe	1 / 87	Independent	1
Non-Inscrits	16 / 87		
Non-Inscrits	16 / 87	National Alliance	10
Non-Inscrits	16 / 87	Northern League	5
Non-Inscrits	16 / 87	Tricolour Flame	1

=== Summary of parties ===
Party	Main ideology	Leader	European party	Outgoing MEPs
Forza Italia (FI)	Liberal conservatism	Silvio Berlusconi	EPP	26 / 87
Democrats of the Left (DS)	Social democracy	Walter Veltroni	PES	17 / 87
National Alliance – Segni Pact (AN–PS)	Conservatism	Gianfranco Fini; Mario Segni	None	13 / 87
Italian People's Party (PPI)	Christian democracy	Franco Marini	EPP	8 / 78
Northern League (LN)	Regionalism	Umberto Bossi	None	5 / 78
Communist Refoundation Party (PRC)	Communism	Fausto Bertinotti	None	4 / 87
Bonino List (LB)	Libertarianism	Emma Bonino	None	2 / 87
Federation of the Greens (FdV)	Green politics	Grazia Francescato	EFGP	2 / 78
Italian Democratic Socialists (SDI)	Social democracy	Enrico Boselli	PES	2 / 87
Christian Democratic Centre (CCD)	Christian democracy	Pier Ferdinando Casini	EPP	2 / 87
The Democrats (DEM)	Social liberalism	Romano Prodi	ELDR	1 / 87
Tricolour Flame (FT)	Neo-fascism	Pino Rauti	None	1 / 87
Italian Republican Party – Federation of Liberals (PRI–FdL)	Liberalism	Giorgio La Malfa; Raffaello Morelli	ELDR	1 / 87
United Christian Democrats (CDU)	Christian democracy	Rocco Buttiglione	EPP	0 / 87
Party of Italian Communists (PdCI)	Communism	Armando Cossutta	None	0 / 87
Union of Democrats for Europe (UDEUR)	Christian democracy	Clemente Mastella	EPP	0 / 87
Italian Renewal (RI)	Liberalism	Lamberto Dini	EPP	0 / 87
Pensioners' Party (PP)	Pensioners' interests	Carlo Fatuzzo	ED	0 / 87

== Results ==
The election was won again by Forza Italia (FI), which had joined the European People's Party (EEP), with 25.2% of the votes and 22 seats. The governing Democrats of the Left (DS), led by Walter Veltroni, got 17.3% of the vote and 15 seats, while National Alliance (AN), federated to the Segni Pact (PS), got 10.3% of the vote and 9 seats (8 seats to AN and one seat to PS). A good result was also obtained by the Bonino List (LB), which gained 8.5% of the vote and 7 seats.

← Summary of the 13 June 1999 European Parliament election results in Italy →
National party	Votes	%	+/–	Seats	+/–
Forza Italia (FI)	7,813,948	25.16	5.46 ▼	22	5 ▼
Democrats of the Left (DS)	5,387,729	17.34	1.72 ▼	15	1 ▼
National Alliance – Segni Pact (AN–PS)	3,194,661	10.30	5.43 ▼	9	5 ▼
Bonino List (LB)	2,625,881	8.45	6.32 ▲	7	5 ▲
The Democrats (DEM)	2,402,435	7.73	New	6	New
Northern League (LN)	1,395,547	4.48	2.08 ▼	4	2 ▼
Communist Refoundation Party (PRC)	1,391,595	4.27	1.81 ▼	4	1 ▼
Italian People's Party (PPI)	1,316,830	4.24	5.76 ▼	4	4 ▼
Christian Democratic Centre (CCD)	805,320	2.59	New	2	New
Italian Democratic Socialists (SDI)	670,957	2.16	0.37 ▼	2	1 ▼
United Christian Democrats (CDU)	669,919	2.16	New	2	New
Party of Italian Communists (PdCI)	622,261	2.00	New	2	New
Federation of the Greens (FdV)	548,987	1.76	1.44 ▼	2	1 ▼
Union of Democrats for Europe (UDEUR)	498,742	1.61	New	1	New
Tricolour Flame (FT)	496,030	1.60	New	1	New
Italian Renewal (RI)	353,890	1.14	New	1	New
Pensioners' Party (PP)	233,874	0.75	–	1	1 ▲
Italian Republican Party – Federation of Liberals (PRI–FdL)	168,620	0.54	0.36 ▼	1	0
South Tyrolean People's Party (SVP) (Note: List connected with The Democrats)	156,005	0.50	0.12 ▼	1	0
LVR – UfS – FG – Others	117,979	0.38	–	0	0
Southern Action League (LAM)	94,181	0.30	0.37 ▼	0	0
Sardinian Action Party – Veneto North-East – Italian Consumers Party	61,185	0.19	–	0	0
Socialist Party (PS)	42,500	0.14	New	0	New
Federalism (Valdostan Union – Others)	40,970	0.13	0.26 ▼	0	0
Humanist Party (PU)	16,168	0.05	–	0	0
Cobas for Self-Organization	4,432	0.01	New	0	New
Valid votes	31,062,426	90.4			
Blank and invalid votes	3,315,038	9.6			
Totals	34,359,339	100	—	87	0
Electorate (eligible voters) and voter turnout		49,278,309	69.73	3.87 ▼	
Source: Ministry of the Interior

Popular vote
FI	25.2%
DS	17.3%
AN–PS	10.3%
Bonino	8.5%
Dem	7.7%
LN	4.5%
PRC	4.3%
PPI	4.2%
CCD	2.6%
SDI	2.2%
CDU	2.2%
PdCI	2.0%
FdV	1.8%
UDEUR	1.6%
FT	1.6%
RI	1.1%
Others	2.9%

=== Distribution by European group ===
European Parliament group	Seats	National party	Seats
European People's Party–European Democrats	34 / 87	Forza Italia (FI)	22
European People's Party–European Democrats	34 / 87	Italian People's Party (PPI)	4
European People's Party–European Democrats	34 / 87	Christian Democratic Centre (CCD)	2
European People's Party–European Democrats	34 / 87	United Christian Democrats (CDU)	2
European People's Party–European Democrats	34 / 87	Union of Democrats for Europe (UDEUR)	1
European People's Party–European Democrats	34 / 87	Italian Renewal (RI)	1
European People's Party–European Democrats	34 / 87	Pensioners' Party (PP)	1
European People's Party–European Democrats	34 / 87	South Tyrolean People's Party (SVP)	1
Socialist Group in the European Parliament	17 / 87	Democrats of the Left (DS)	15
Socialist Group in the European Parliament	17 / 87	Italian Democratic Socialists (SDI)	2
Technical Group of Independents	12 / 87	Bonino List (LB)	7
Technical Group of Independents	12 / 87	Northern League (LN)	4
Technical Group of Independents	12 / 87	Tricolour Flame (FT)	1
Union for Europe of the Nations	9 / 87	National Alliance (AN)	8
Union for Europe of the Nations	9 / 87	Segni Pact (PS)	1
European Liberal Democrat and Reform Party Group	7 / 87	The Democrats (DEM)	6
European Liberal Democrat and Reform Party Group	7 / 87	Italian Republican Party (PRI)	1
European United Left–Nordic Green Left	6 / 87	Communist Refoundation Party (PRC)	4
European United Left–Nordic Green Left	6 / 87	Party of Italian Communists (PdCI)	2
The Greens–European Free Alliance	2 / 87	Federation of the Greens (FdV)	2
