= Mirella Liuzzi =

Italian politician (born 1985)

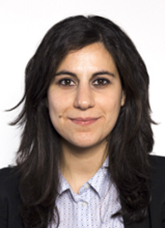
- Liuzzi in 2018

Member of the Chamber of Deputies
- In office 15 March 2013 – 12 October 2022
- Constituency: Basilicata (2013–2018); Basilicata – P01 (2018–2022)

Personal details
- Born: 27 February 1985 (age 41)
- Party: Five Star Movement

Mirella Liuzzi (born 27 February 1985) is an Italian politician. From 2013 to 2022, she was a member of the Chamber of Deputies. From 2019 to 2021, she served as undersecretary of the Ministry of Economic Development.
