= Pact of Liberal Democrats =

Political party

The Pact of Liberal Democrats (Patto dei Liberaldemocratici), also called Segni-Scognamiglio Pact (Patto Segni-Scognamiglio), was a liberal and Christian-democratic Italian political party.

It was conceived in 2003 by Mario Segni, Carlo Scognamiglio Pasini (ex-PLI, ex-PL, ex-FI, ex-UDR, ex-UpR, ex-FdL and ex-DE) and Michele Cossa (leader of the Sardinian Reformers), as a centrist party alternative to the centre-left. The party is aimed at changing Italian political system and especially Italian centre-right, which is perceived by its leaders as populist under the leadership of Silvio Berlusconi. The party is basically the continuation of the late Patto Segni.

Segni and Scognamiglio launched PLD in time for contesting the 2004 European Parliament election, in which they hoped to attract many disgruntled centre-right voters. Instead PLD scored only 0.5% (7.4% in Sardinia, where its regional division, the Sardinian Reformers, is aligned with the House of Freedoms).

After that the centre-right decided again to rally behind Berlusconi, Segni and Scognamiglio decided not to present their list for the 2006 general election, in which Berlusconi's Forza Italia scored 23.7% and the Sardinian Reformers elected a Senator, Massimo Fantola, in UDC list. Segni and supporters opposed the 2006 Constitutional Referendum.

In early 2007 Segni became Coordinator of the Promoting Committee of the Electoral Referendum, led by Giovanni Guzzetta. This would place Segni alongside politicians such as Gianni Alemanno, Angelino Alfano, Mercedes Bresso, Riccardo Illy, Renato Brunetta, Antonio Martino, Giovanna Melandri, Arturo Parisi, Daniele Capezzone, Stefania Prestigiacomo, Gaetano Quagliariello, and Giorgio Tonini in the fight for a majority based electoral system. On July 24 of 2007 Segni handed over 800,000 signatures to the Court of Cassation for the presentation of the Electoral Referendum. The referendum, which took place on 21–22 June 2009, did not reach the required quorum. After the failure of the referendum, Segni left parliamentary politics.
