= 1991 Italian electoral law referendum =

| 9 June 1991 |

Results
| Choice | Votes | % |
|---|---|---|
| Yes | 26,896,979 | 95.57% |
| No | 1,247,908 | 4.43% |
| Valid votes | 28,144,887 | 95.05% |
| Invalid or blank votes | 1,464,748 | 4.95% |
| Total votes | 29,609,635 | 100.00% |
| Registered voters/turnout | 47,377,843 | 62.5% |

An abrogative referendum on the electoral law was held in Italy on 9 June 1991. Voters were asked whether the clause of the law on the number of preference votes should be scrapped. The result was 95.6% in favour, with a turnout of 65.1%.

== Background ==
In 1990 a group of reformers, led by Mario Segni, allied with the Radical Party began calling for change to a political system that had seen the Christian Democracy and the Italian Communist Party emerge as the two largest parties in almost every election since World War II. They argued that this caused chronic inefficiency and that the adoption of the Westminster system would lead to a period of political strength. Initially, they promoted a referendum on abolishing multiple preference votes in the proportional representation system used since 1946. They argued that the system had led to minor lobbies inside parties, with group of candidates allied against other candidates of the same list, causing instability.

== Results ==
| Choice | Votes | % |
|---|---|---|
| ✓ Yes | 26,896,979 | 95.57 |
| No | 1,247,908 | 4.43 |
| Invalid/blank votes | 1,464,748 | – |
| Total | 29,609,635 | 100 |
| Registered voters/turnout | 47,377,843 | 62.50 |
Source: Ministry of the Interior
