= Mario Segni =

Italian politician (born 1939)

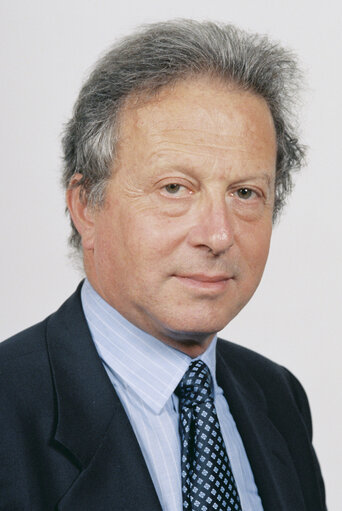

State Secretary of Agricultural, Food and Forestry Policies
- In office 4 August 1986 – 28 July 1987
- Prime Minister: Bettino Craxi; Amintore Fanfani
- Preceded by: Giuseppe Zurlo
- Succeeded by: Francesco Cimino

Member of the Chamber of Deputies
- In office 5 July 1976 – 8 May 1996
- Constituency: Sardinia

Member of the European Parliament
- In office 19 July 1994 – 19 July 2004
- Constituency: Islands (1994–1999); North-West (1999–2004)

Personal details
- Born: Mariotto Segni; 16 May 1939 (age 87) Sassari, Italy
- Party: DC (1976–1993); AD (1993); PS (1993–2003); PSS (2003–2006)
- Other political affiliations: PpI (1994); EPP (1994–1995); PS–AN (1999); UEN (1999–2004)
- Parents: Antonio Segni (father); Laura Carta Caprino (mother)
- Education: University of Sassari
- Profession: Politician; professor

Mariotto "Mario" Segni (born 16 May 1939) is a retired Italian politician and professor of civil law. He founded several parties, which focused on fighting for electoral reform through referendums. He is the son of the politician Antonio Segni, one-time president of Italy.

== Biography ==
Segni was born May 16, 1939, in Sassari, Sardinia. He was born to Antonio Segni, himself a prominent politician, and Laura Carta Caprino, who would have a total of four children. Prior to his political career Segni studied law at the University of Sassari, following in the footsteps of his father.

=== Academic career ===
Following his graduation, Segni moved to Padau where he worked under Luigi Carraro, a four-time Christian Democrat Senator, and taught at university. In 1975 he became a professor of civil law at the University of Sassari. He was the chair of the Faculty of Law at the University of Sassari until his retirement in 2011.

=== Christian Democrats ===
A long-time member of Christian Democracy, like his father, he was first elected Regional Councillor in 1967. Shortly after gaining his position at the University of Sassari, Segni ran for the national parliament in 1976. He came second behind Francesco Cossiga with 85,736 votes but still won a seat. He continued to hold this office until 1996. He served as State Secretary of the Ministry Agricultural, Food and Forestry Policies in the second Craxi government and in the sixth Fanfani government. He was also chairman of the Control Committee for Information and Security Services and for State Secrecy from 1987 to 1991.

=== Election Reform and Starting a Party ===
Riding the momentum from the 1991 Italian electoral law referendum, which he supported, Segni contributed to the establishment of the Democratic Alliance in 1992. He also founded the Populars for Reform that same year, with the goal of changing the electoral system from proportional representation to a first-past-the-post system. In 1993, these reforms led to the Mattarellum law which he said would bring stability to Italy by making it more similar to Anglo-Saxon democracies.

In 1993, Segni broke from the Christian Democrats, who were suffering from tangentopoli, while he served in the XI legislature. In March 1994, he founded the Segni Pact from the remains of the previous Democratic Alliance and Populars for Reform. Segni had hoped to capitalize on the political vacuum left by the now tainted Christian Democrats.

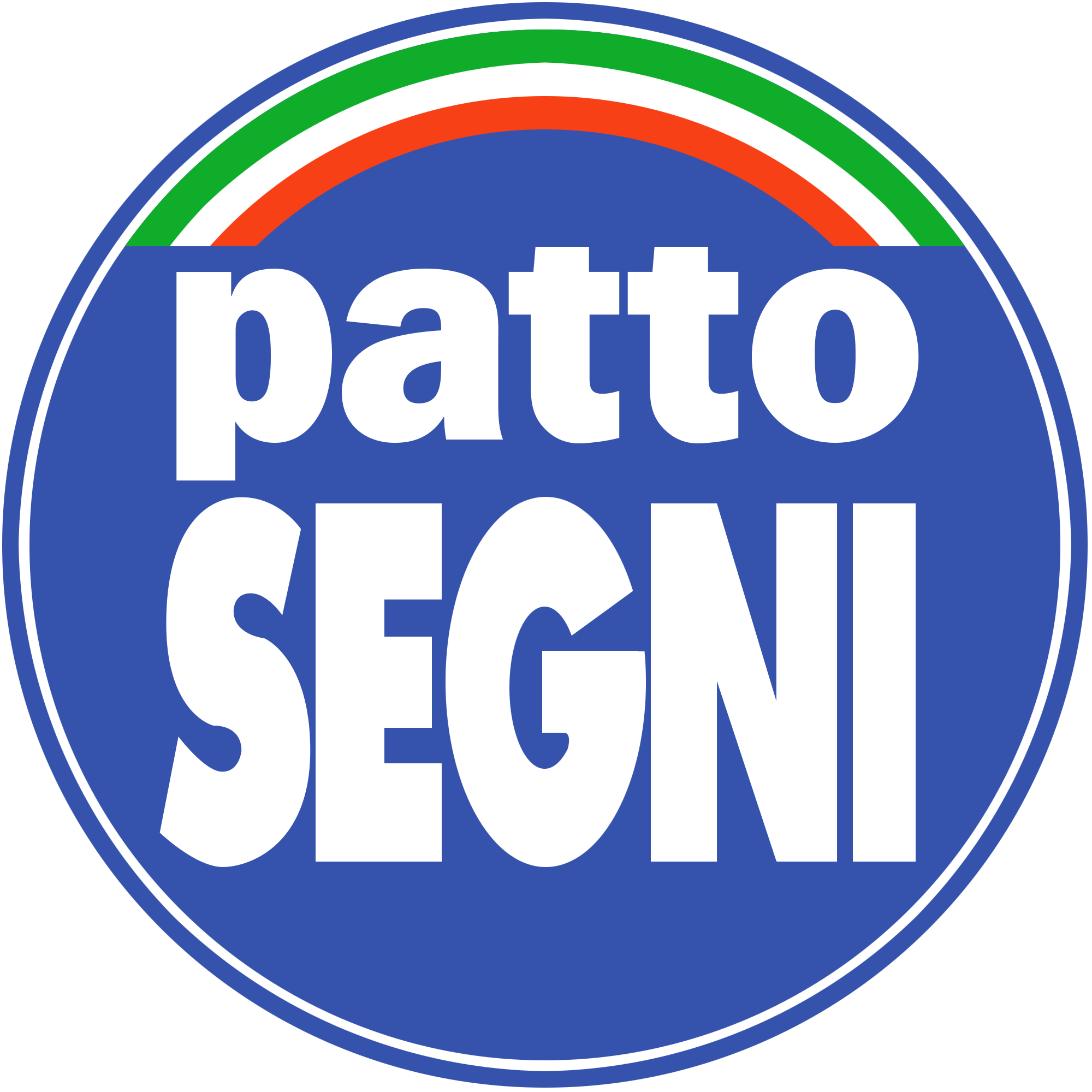
Patto Segni logo (1994)

Segni was a candidate for Prime Minister for the centrist alliance Pact for Italy (composed of Mino Martinazzoli's Italian People's Party and the Segni Pact) in 1994, and a Member of the European Parliament(MEP) from 1994 to 1995. The party as a whole, however, did not have much initial success and joined the Anti-Berlusconi coalition during the first Berlusconi government. During his first tenure in the European Parliament he joined the European People's Party along with several other members of the Segni Pact, Danilo Poggiolini, Vincenzo Viola, and Livio Filippi. He was a part of the European Parliament's delegation to the Arab Maghreb Union. His party joined with the Italian Renewal List while he began refocusing on teaching.

In 1999, Mario Segni returned to the domestic political scene, with the aim of attempting to abolish proportional quotas via referendums. Despite his failure to do so, in the 1999 European election, the Sengi Pact co-federated with the National Alliance, creating the Segni Pact – National Alliance list, a coalition also known as the 'elephant' headed by Gianfranco Fini He won a second term as an MEP and voted alongside the Union for Europe of the Nations. During this tenure, he served on the Committee of Constitutional Affairs, the delegation to MERCOSUR, and acted as vice-chair for the delegation to Central America and Mexico.

In 2003 he rebranded the Segni Pact, combining forces with Carlo Scognamiglio and former Segni Pact member's the Sardinian Reformers, naming it the Pact of Liberal Democrats. It continued to criticize the Berlusconi camp. This culminated in his siding with the 'no' vote on the 2006 Constitutional Referendum.

During the 2006 election for the Presidency of the Italian Senate, Segni supported Franco Marini over former Christian Democrat head Giulio Andreotti, citing a respect for the old regime but a desire to see more progress in Italian politics and a fear of a return to the corruption prior to the Mani Pulite investigation.

In early 2007 he became Coordinator of the Promoting Committee of the Electoral Referendum, led by Giovanni Guzzetta. This placed Segni alongside politicians such as Gianni Alemanno, Angelino Alfano, Mercedes Bresso, Riccardo Illy, Renato Brunetta, Antonio Martino, Giovanna Melandri, Arturo Parisi, Daniele Capezzone, Stefania Prestigiacomo, Gaetano Quagliariello, and Giorgio Tonini in the fight for a majority based electoral system. On 24 July 2007, Segni handed over 800,000 signatures to the Court of Cassation for the presentation of the Electoral Referendum. The 2009 Italian electoral law referendum, took place in June 2009, but did not reach the required quorum.

=== Retirement ===
After Segni left politics he continued to provide political commentary as a well known figure. In 2018, he was interviewed on the developments in Italian politics and provided his opinion on the developments regarding the Northern League and the 5 Star Movement. He also gave his view on the push to return to a proportional representation system in Italy, stating that "the memory of Italy is short."

Mario Segni is also the current president of the Antonio Segni Foundation, which seeks to put his father's work online.

== Legacy ==
While Segni's party was not electorally successful, he is still known for his work through referendums. His work targeting the electoral system through referendums have been described as "contributing to the collapse of the established political system" of the first republic. While he was not entirely electorally successful, he is considered to have had success via the referendum process and is characterized as having been one of the most powerful politicians of Italy at his peak.

He has criticized prominent politicians in Italy such as Berlusconi and movements within the country.

== Culture ==
=== Filmography ===
- Mario Segni appeared in the documentary television series The Night of the Republic January 3, 1990.
- In 1993 Segni appeared on Maurizio Costanzo's talk show.
- In 2005 the TV series 1992 directed by Giuseppe Gagliardi included Massimo Wertmüller in the role of Mario Segni.

=== Literature ===
==== Written on him ====
- Primo Di Nicola wrote a biography of Mario Segni in 1992.
- Mark Gilbert included him in his book The A to Z of Modern Italy ISBN 978-1-4616-7202-9
- Paul Ginsborg included him in his book Italy and Its Discontents: Family, Civil Society, State

==== Written by him ====
- Mario Segni published La Rivoluzione Interrotta in 1994, this book discussed his attempted 'revolution' within Italian politics.
- In 1999 Mario Segni wrote Il referendum che cambierà l'Italia.
- In 2001 Mario Segni wrote Allargamento e coesione: un equilibrio difficile in the journal "Rivista giuridica del Mezzogiorno"
- in 2010 Mario Segni wrote Niente di personale. Solo cambiare l'Italia.
