= Independentist Sardinian Party =

The Independentist Sardinian Party (Partidu Sardu Indipendentista, PSIn) was a minor separatist and democratic-socialist political party in Sardinia, Italy.

The party was founded in 1984 by Anghelu Caria and won 1.5 and 2.1% respectively in the 1992 Italian general election and in 1994, before being transformed into Sardigna Natzione. The current leaders of Sardinia Nation and Independence Republic of Sardinia, Bustianu Cumpostu and Gavino Sale, were both leading members of the PSIn.
