= 1992 Italian general election in Sardinia =

The Italian general election of 1992 took place on 5 April 1992.

Christian Democracy was by far the largest party in Sardinia, largely ahead of the Italian Socialist Party and the Democratic Party of the Left.

== Results ==
=== Chamber of Deputies ===
Parties	votes	votes (%)	seats
Christian Democracy	349,596	33.7	7
Italian Socialist Party	159,739	15.4	3
Democratic Party of the Left	148,251	14.3	3
Sardinian Action Party	69,615	6.7	1
Communist Refoundation Party	69,080	6.7	1
Italian Republican Party	54,366	5.2	1
Italian Social Movement	53,783	5.2	1
Italian Democratic Socialist Party	43,531	4.2	1
Italian Liberal Party	29,166	2.8	1
Federation of the Greens	24,338	2.3	-
Independentist Sardinian Party	15,106	1.5	-
Pannella List	10,340	1.0	-
Others	11,992	1.2	-
Total	1,038,903	100.0	19

Source: Ministry of the Interior

=== Senate ===
Parties	votes	votes (%)	seats
Christian Democracy	256,381	30.2	4
Democratic Party of the Left	134.779	15.9	2
Italian Socialist Party	132,048	15.6	2
Sardinian Action Party	80,676	9.5	1
Communist Refoundation Party	63,291	7.5	-
Italian Social Movement	59,323	7.0	-
Italian Democratic Socialist Party	31,261	3.7	-
Federation of the Greens	27,958	3.3	-
Italian Republican Party	26,628	3.1	-
Italian Liberal Party	18,581	2.2	-
Independentist Sardinian Party	13,426	1.6	-
Others	3,781	0.5	-
Total	848,133	100.0	9

Source: Ministry of the Interior
