= 2009 Italian electoral law referendum =

Three abrogative referendums on the electoral law were held in Italy on 21–22 June 2009. They were promoted by Mario Segni, Giovanni Guzzetta, Arturo Parisi, Antonio Martino and Daniele Capezzone. With a turnout of 23.31% / 23.84%, the referendums did not reach the necessary quorum of 50% voters, so were not valid.

The three questions were about giving the majority prize to the most voted list in the Chamber of Deputies (question 1, purple ballot) and in the Senate (question 2, yellow ballot) as opposed to the most voted coalition, as is the current law, and about preventing politicians from standing in multiple constituencies at the same time (question 3, green ballot).

The Promoting Committee and Democratic Party (PD) had proposed holding the referendums together with European Parliament elections, whereas The People of Freedom (PdL) as its main ally, the Lega Nord, opposed the referendums and answered that never, in Italian history, an election and a referendum were jointly celebrated.

Several PdL party officials had long supported the referendums, the main long-term goal of the PdL being to transform Italian politics into a two-party system. The PD saw the referendums as an opportunity to overcome its current political hard times and to divide the centre-right.

== Results ==
The referendums did not reach the quorum required by law for their validity.

=== First question ===
Italian Chamber of Deputies — Abrogation of the connection between lists and of the attribution of the majority prize to a coalition of lists.

Results
Choice	Votes	%
For	8,052,954	77.64
Against	2,318,792	22.36
Total	10,371,746	100.00
Valid votes	10,371,746	88.59
Invalid/blank votes	1,336,486	11.41
Total votes	11,708,232	100.00
Registered voters/turnout	50,221,071	23.31
Turnout needed		50.00
Source: Italian Ministry of the Interior

=== Second question ===
Italian Senate — Abrogation of the connection between lists and of the attribution of the majority prize to a coalition of lists.

Results
Choice	Votes	%
For	8,050,362	77.69
Against	2,311,350	22.31
Total	10,361,712	100.00
Valid votes	10,361,712	88.51
Invalid/blank votes	1,345,075	11.49
Total votes	11,706,787	100.00
Registered voters/turnout	50,221,071	23.31
Turnout needed		50.00
Source: Italian Ministry of the Interior

=== Third question ===
Italian Chamber of Deputies — Abrogation of the possibility for a candidate to stand for election in more than one constituency.

Results
Choice	Votes	%
For	9,489,791	87.00
Against	1,417,819	13.00
Total	10,907,610	100.00
Valid votes	10,907,610	91.10
Invalid/blank votes	1,065,586	8.90
Total votes	11,973,196	100.00
Registered voters/turnout	50,221,071	23.84
Turnout needed		50.00
Source: Italian Ministry of the Interior
