= National Alliance – Segni Pact =

National Alliance – Segni Pact Alleanza Nazionale – Patto Segni
- Leaders: Gianfranco Fini; Mario Segni
- Founded: 1999
- Dissolved: 1999
- Ideology: Conservatism; Christian democracy
- Political position: Centre-right to right-wing
- European affiliation: Alliance for Europe of the Nations
- European Parliament group: Union for Europe of the Nations

National Alliance – Segni Pact (Italian: Alleanza Nazionale – Patto Segni) was a short-lived electoral alliance between National Alliance and Segni Pact for the 1999 European election, headed by Gianfranco Fini and Mario Segni. The alliance's logo (an elephant) made reference to the US Republican Party. The alliance, known informally as "the Elephant", won 10.30% of the vote and 9 seats.

== Election results ==
=== European Parliament ===
European Parliament
Election year	Votes	%	Seats	+/–	Leader
1999	3,202,895 (3rd)	10.3	9 / 87	–	Gianfranco Fini
