= Arnaldo Lomuti =

Italian politician (born 1975)

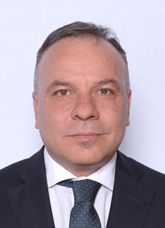
- Lomuti in 2022

Member of the Chamber of Deputies
- Incumbent
- Assumed office 13 October 2022
- Constituency: Basilicata – P01

Member of the Senate
- In office 23 March 2018 – 12 October 2022
- Constituency: Basilicata – P01

Personal details
- Born: 14 February 1975 (age 51)
- Party: Five Star Movement

Arnaldo Lomuti (born 14 February 1975) is an Italian politician serving as a member of the Chamber of Deputies since 2022. From 2018 to 2022, he was a member of the Senate.
