= Piedmont 2 (Chamber of Deputies constituency) =

- Chamber of Deputies; Electoral constituency
- Region: Piedmont
- Electorate: 1,632,591 (2018)
- Major settlements: Alessandria, Asti, Biella, Cuneo, Novara, Verbania, Vercelli

Current constituency
- Created: 1993
- Seats: 23
- Members: Lega (9); M5S (4); PD (3); FI (3); FdI (2); LeU (1); NcI (1)

Piedmont 2 is one of the 29 constituencies (Italian: circoscrizioni) represented in the Chamber of Deputies, the lower house of the Italian parliament. The constituency currently elects 23 deputies. Its boundaries correspond to those of the provinces of Alessandria, Asti, Biella, Cuneo, Novara, Verbano-Cusio-Ossola and Vercelli, within the Piedmont region. The electoral system uses a parallel voting system, which act as a mixed system, with 37% of seats allocated using a first-past-the-post electoral system and 61% using a proportional method, with one round of voting.

The constituency was first established by the Mattarella law on 4 August 1993 and later confirmed by the Calderoli law on 21 December 2005 and by the Rosato law on 3 November 2017.
