= Salvatore Caiata =

Italian politician (born 1970)

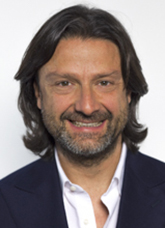
- Caiata in 2018

Member of the Chamber of Deputies
- Incumbent
- Assumed office 23 March 2018
- Constituency: Basilicata – 01 (2018–2022); Basilicata – 01 (2022–present)

Personal details
- Born: 29 July 1970 (age 56)
- Party: Brothers of Italy (since 2019)

Salvatore Caiata (born 29 July 1970) is an Italian politician serving as a member of the Chamber of Deputies since 2018. He has served as president of the Italian delegation to the parliamentary assembly of the Central European Initiative since 2023.

== Biography ==
A native of Potenza, where he graduated from the Leonardo da Vinci Technical Commercial Institute, he later moved to Siena to attend University of Siena, where he earned a degree in Economics.
