= Martin Clark (historian) =

British historian

Martin Clark (30 September 1938 – 5 August 2017) was a British historian noted for his work on modern Italy. He published at least four books, but is best known for Modern Italy, 1871 to the Present, first published by Longman in 1984. Described as 'authoritative', it was revised twice. For the last two years of his life, he suffered from Parkinson's disease.

== Early life ==
Martin Nile Clark was born on 30 September 1938, in Worthing, West Sussex, the third child to Alfred Clark, a civil servant and his wife Muriel. During the war the family moved to Llandudno, where Clark attended the Ysgol John Bright, and learned to speak Welsh. He had an affinity for languages and when he joined the National Service, Clark was sent to the Joint Services School for Linguists at Crail. Here he learned Russian for signals intelligence.

== Academic career ==
During his time studying history at Peterhouse, Cambridge, he became interested in modern Italy, encouraged by Denis Mack Smith. He joined the British Council where he travelled around Europe before returning to Birkbeck College, where he studied the organisation of factory workers in Turin after World War I under the supervision of Eric Hobsbawm. He completed his PhD dissertation 'Factory councils and the Italian labour movement, 1916-21' in 1966, the basis for his book Antonio Gramsci and the Revolution that Failed (1977). The year before, in 1965, he had joined the Politics department at the University of Edinburgh as an assistant lecturer. He remained there until his retirement in 2001.

== Bibliography ==
- Antonio Gramsci and the Revolution that Failed (1977)
- Modern Italy, 1871 to the Present (1984, 1995, 2008)
- The Italian Risorgimento (1998)
- Mussolini (2014)
