= Pact for Italy =

Italian electoral alliance

Pact for Italy Patto per l'Italia
- Leader: Mariotto Segni; Mino Martinazzoli
- Founded: January 1994
- Dissolved: March 1995
- Ideology: Liberalism; Christian democracy
- Political position: Centre

The Pact for Italy (Italian: Patto per l'Italia) was a centrist political and electoral alliance in Italy launched by Mario Segni and Mino Martinazzoli in 1994.

== History ==
The alliance was composed of the Italian People's Party (PPI), the main successor party to Christian Democracy, the Segni Pact, the Liberal Democratic Union of Valerio Zanone and remnants of the Italian Republican Party (PRI), alongside a certain number of independent politicians coming from the Italian Socialist Party and the Italian Democratic Socialist Party.

Originally Lega Nord was to also join the alliance, but Lega Nord leader Umberto Bossi decided to join Silvio Berlusconi's Pole of Freedoms instead.

The alliance finished third place in the 1994 general election, behind the centre-right Pole of Freedoms/Pole of Good Government and the left-wing Alliance of Progressives. The alliance returned 33 seats in the Chamber of Deputies.

After the election, the alliance was disbanded. The PPI suffered a split of those who wanted to join Berlusconi's centre-right coalition (breaking from the PPI and forming the United Christian Democrats of Rocco Buttiglione) and those who wanted to ally with the left-wing Democratic Party of the Left (PDS). The remaining PPI joined the PDS in the centre-left coalition The Olive Tree led by Romano Prodi. Segni Pact become a minor force and formed the Pact of Democrats joint electoral list with Italian Renewal and the Italian Socialists for the 1996 general election in support of The Olive Tree. The Italian Republican Party and the Liberal Democratic Union joined PPI's list Populars for Prodi, also in support for The Olive Tree.

== Composition ==
It was composed of the following political parties:

Party	Ideology	Leader
Italian People's Party (PPI)	Christian democracy	Mino Martinazzoli
Segni Pact (PS)	Centrism	Mariotto Segni
Italian Republican Party (PRI)	Liberalism	Giorgio La Malfa
Liberal Democratic Union (ULD)	Liberalism	Valerio Zanone

The Pact was also joined by a number of former members of the Italian Socialist Party (PSI) and the Italian Democratic Socialist Party (PSDI), now running as independents, such as Giuliano Amato and Giulio Tremonti.

== Electoral results ==
Election	Leader	Chamber of Deputies				Senate of the Republic			
Election	Leader	Votes	%	Seats	Position	Votes	%	Seats	Position
1994	Mario Segni	6,019,038	15.63	4 / 630	3rd	5,519,090	16.69	31 / 315	3rd
