= Alliance of Progressives =

Alliance of Progressives Alleanza dei Progressisti
- Leader: Achille Occhetto (first); Fausto Bertinotti (last)
- Founded: 1 February 1994 (first iteration); 1996 (second iteration)
- Dissolved: March 1995 (first iteration); 1996 (second iteration)
- Succeeded by: The Olive Tree
- Political position: Left-wing

The Alliance of Progressives (Italian: Alleanza dei Progressisti) was a left-wing political alliance of parties in Italy formed in 1994, with relevant predecessors at local level in 1993. The leader of the alliance was Achille Occhetto. The alliance was a predecessor of the modern-day centre-left coalition.

== History ==
The Alliance of Progressives was formed in the wake of Tangentopoli and the end of the so-called First Republic, when the once-dominant Christian Democrats (DC) and four other establishment parties collapsed and were replaced by new political formations during 1992–1994, while the Italian Communist Party had earlier in 1991 abandoned communism and reformed itself as the Democratic Party of the Left (PDS).

The PDS was the core party of the Alliance, which also included the Communist Refoundation Party, the Federation of the Greens, the remnant Italian Socialist Party and Socialist Rebirth, DC splinter Social Christians, the anti-Mafia Network and Democratic Alliance, the latter formed by former Republicans and Socialists. The Alliance was formed in part as a response to the Italian electoral system moving to a more majoritarian system.

The Alliance suffered a decisive defeat in the 1994 general election by the centre-right coalition led by Silvio Berlusconi, which was organised as the Pole of Freedoms in northern Italy and Pole of Good Government in southern Italy. In the election both left-wing and centre-right coalitions also competed with the Pact for Italy, a centrist alliance formed by DC successor the Italian People's Party (PPI) and the Segni Pact.

For the 1995 regional election and 1996 general election the Alliance was succeeded by a broader centre-left coalition led by Romano Prodi known as The Olive Tree, which included the PPI (diminished by the split of the United Christian Democrats in 1995), Segni Pact and Italian Renewal, but excluding the Communist Refoundation Party, which was an external ally and presented its candidates under the "Progressives" banner in some single-seat constituencies.

== Composition ==
The alliance was composed of:

Party	Ideology	Leader
Democratic Party of the Left (PDS)	Democratic socialism	Achille Occhetto
Social Christians (Note: Contested elections under the PDS electoral lists.)	Christian left	Pierre Carniti
Communist Refoundation Party (PRC)	Communism	Fausto Bertinotti
Federation of the Greens (FdV)	Green politics	Carlo Ripa di Meana
Italian Socialist Party (PSI)	Social democracy	Ottaviano Del Turco
Socialist Rebirth (RS) (Note: Contested elections under the PSI electoral lists.)	Social democracy	Giorgio Benvenuto
The Network (LR)	Anti-corruption	Leoluca Orlando
Democratic Alliance (AD)	Social liberalism	Willer Bordon

== Election results ==
Election	Leader	Chamber of Deputies					Senate of the Republic				
Election	Leader	Votes	%	Seats	-/+	Position	Votes	%	Seats	-/+	Position
1994	Achille Occhetto	12,632,680	32.81	213 / 630	New	2nd	10,881,320	32.90	123 / 315	New	2nd
1996	Fausto Bertinotti	982,505	2.62	15 / 630	▼198	5th	934,974	2.87	10 / 315	▼113	4th
