= Giorgio Benvenuto =

Italian trade unionist and politician

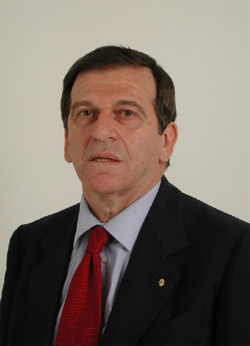
Giorgio Benvenuto

Giorgio Benvenuto (born 8 December 1937) is an Italian trade unionist and politician.

He was general secretary of Italian Labour Union (UIL), one of the largest Italian trade union centers from 1976 to 1992.

He was general secretary of Italian Socialist Party (PSI) succeeding Bettino Craxi in 1993.

== Biography ==
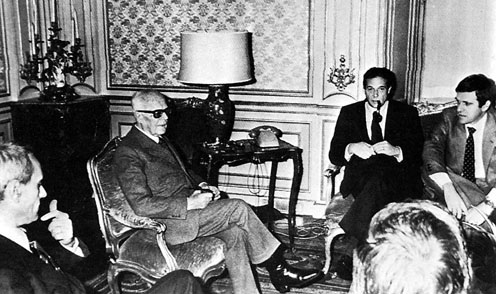
Former Italian President Pertini in a meeting with confederated trade unions secretaries Carniti (CISL), Lama (CGIL) and Benvenuto (UIL).

Benvenuto was born in Gaeta, where his father served as officer of Navy; his origins, however, are from Campania by his father's side and from Chieti by his mother Corsi. Soon afterwards his father was transferred to Pula. In 1943 the family went on holiday to their maternal grandparents in Chieti and never returned to Istria where they lost their home and all property. After September 8, the father went underground in Chieti and, wanted by the Germans, was hidden first in a cavity of the grandparents' house and then in the crypt of the Cathedral of San Giustino. Finally he crossed the front to Ortona. After the liberation of Chieti, Giorgio Benvenuto and the family joined their father in Messina where they lived from 1945 to 1947.

He joined the Italian Labour Union (UIL) on 1 October 1955 where he held operational positions in the confederation and metalworkers' union. He was secretary general of the Italian Union of Metalworkers (UILM) from 1969 to 1976 and founded the Metalworkers Federation (FLM) with Pierre Carniti and Bruno Trentin in 1972.

In 1976, succeeding Raffaele Vanni, he was elected Secretary General of the UIL where he remained until 1992, when he was appointed Secretary General of the Ministry of Economy and Finance. He was vice president of the European Metalworkers Federation (1971–1976) and vice president of the European Trade Union Confederation (1978–1981; 1987–1990). He was a member of the National Council for Economics and Labour (CNEL) from 1981 to 1991.

On 14 February 1993 Benvenuto was elected Secretary of the Italian Socialist Party, succeeding Bettino Craxi. He held office for 100 days, until May of the same year, trying, unsuccessfully, to dismiss the people investigated from political positions in the PSI at the time of Tangentopoli.

After leaving the Socialist Party, he was one of the founders of the Democratic Alliance together with Giorgio Bogi, Ferdinando Adornato and Willer Bordon. On the occasion of the 1996 general election, he joined with the Democratic Alliance the project of the Democratic Union of Antonio Maccanico, member of The Olive Tree coalition, and was elected to the Chamber of Deputies in the Turin-Mirafiori constituency .

In early 1998 he joined the Democrats of the Left, subsequently, he was President of the National Directorate of DS as coordinator of the Reformers Movement for Europe, which was one of the founding components of the DS. In 2001 he was re-elected MP in the same constituency as the previous election.

He was also a senator from 2006 to 2008. In 2007 he participated in the constitutive act of the Democratic Party in Florence on the occasion of the States General of the Left.

== See also ==
- Italian Labour Union (UIL)
- Italian Socialist Party (PSI)
