= Segni Pact =

Segni Pact Patto Segni
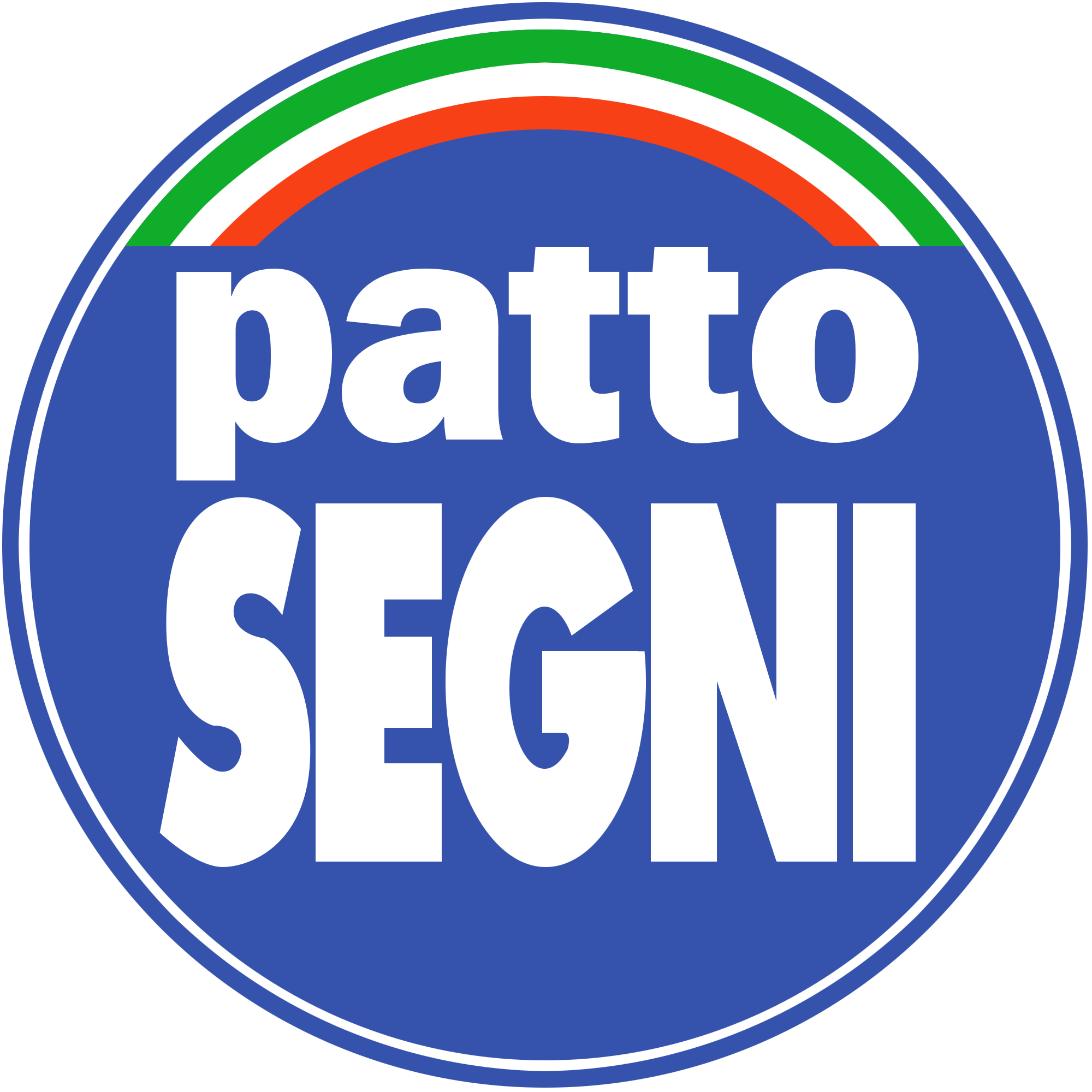
- Leader: Mariotto Segni
- Founded: November 1993
- Dissolved: June 2003
- Split from: Christian Democracy
- Succeeded by: Pact of Liberal Democrats
- Newspaper: La Voce
- Youth wing: Youth Project
- Ideology: 1994-1999; Liberalism; Christian democracy 1999-2003; Liberal conservatism
- Political position: 1994-1999; Centre; 1999-2003; Centre-right
- National affiliation: Pact for Italy (1994); Pact of Democrats (1995); The Olive Tree (1996–99); AN–PS (1999)
- European affiliation: EPP (1994–1999); AEN (1999–2004)
- European Parliament group: EPP (1994–1999); UEN (1999–2004)
- Colors: Yellow

The Segni Pact (Italian: Patto Segni), officially called Pact of National Rebirth (Patto di Rinascita Nazionale), was a Christian-democratic, centrist and liberal political party in Italy. The party was founded and named after Mario Segni, a former member of the Christian Democrats who was a prominent promoter of referendums.

== History ==
The party was founded in 1993 by the Populars for Reform, a split from Christian Democracy (DC) in 1992 whose basic goal was electoral reform from proportional representation to plurality voting, and splinters from the Democratic Alliance (AD).

The party contested the 1994 general election with DC successor the Italian People's Party (PPI) in the Pact for Italy coalition, with the Pact leader Mario Segni designated as "candidate for Prime Minister". The Pact for Italy included in its lists Republicans (Giorgio La Malfa, Alberto Zorzoli, Vittorio Dotti, Danilo Poggiolini and Carla Mazzuca Poggiolini), Liberals (Valerio Zanone, Pietro Milio and Luigi Compagna), Socialists (Giuliano Amato, Giulio Tremonti and Claudio Nicolini), Democratic Socialists (Enrico Ferri and Gian Franco Schietroma), and several former Christian Democrats (Mario Segni himself, Diego Masi, Gianni Rivera, Alberto Michelini, Enrico Indelli, Elisabetta Gardini, Michele Cossa, Livio Filippi, Vincenzo Viola, etc.).

The party obtained 4.7% of the vote and 13 deputies. However soon after the election suffered several splits. The group around Michelini and Tremonti, for instance, founded the Liberal Democratic Foundation and decided to support the Berlusconi I Cabinet (Tremonti even became minister of Finances) and would later join Silvio Berlusconi's Forza Italia (FI).

In the 1995 regional elections, the Segni Pact formed an electoral list named Pact of Democrats, along with the Italian Socialists and AD.

In 1995 the party and PPI joined the centre-left coalition, with the Pact contesting the 1996 general election as part of Italian Renewal, winning eight seats at the Chamber of Deputies (Masi, Giuseppe Bicocchi, Elisa Pozza Tasca, Gianni Rivera, Antonino Mangiacavallo, Gianantonio Mazzocchin, Bonaventura Lamacchia, Paolo Manca) and one seat at the Senate of the Republic (Mazzuca Poggiolini).

In 1999, after having contributed to the foundation of the Democratic Union for the Republic (UDR), the Pact attracted some former Radicals from FI (Marco Taradash, Giuseppe Calderisi, etc.), but at the same time several members (Pozza Tasca, Poggiolini, Mazzuca Poggiolini, Filippi, Viola, etc.) left to join The Democrats. In the 1999 European Parliament election the party formed a joint list with National Alliance which received 10.3% of the vote, and Segni was re-elected MEP.

The Pact decided not to present lists for the 2001 general election, but Cossa, member of the Sardinian Reformers, the regional section of the party in Sardinia, was elected deputy in a single-seat constituency of Cagliari for the House of Freedoms centre-right coalition.

In 2003 the party was finally transformed into the Pact of Liberal Democrats (also known as the Segni-Scognamiglio Pact).

== Electoral results ==
Chamber of Deputies
Election year	Votes	%	Seats	+/−	Leader
1994	1,811,814 (7th)	4.68	13 / 630	–	Mario Segni
1996	into RI	–	8 / 630	▼5	Mario Segni
2001	into CdL	–	1 / 630	▼4	Mario Segni

Senate of the Republic
Election year	Votes	%	Seats	+/−	Leader
1994	into PpI	–	0 / 315	–	Mario Segni
1996	into RI	–	1 / 315	▲1	Mario Segni
2001	into CdL	–	0 / 315	▼1	Mario Segni

=== European Parliament ===
European Parliament
Election year	Votes	%	Seats	+/−	Leader
1994	1,073,424 (7th)	3.26	3 / 81	–	Mario Segni
1999	3,194,661 (3rd) (Note: In a joint list with National Alliance.)	10.30	1 / 81	▼2	Mario Segni
