= Democratic Alliance (Italy) =

Defunct political party in Italy

Democratic Alliance Alleanza Democratica
- Leader: Willer Bordon
- Founded: 15 July 1993
- Dissolved: 1 March 1997
- Succeeded by: Democratic Union
- Ideology: Social liberalism
- Political position: Centre-left
- National affiliation: Alliance of Progressives (1994); The Olive Tree (1996)

The Democratic Alliance (Italian: Alleanza Democratica, AD) was a social-liberal political party in Italy.

AD was founded in 1993 with the intent of becoming the container of an alliance of centre-left forces; however, the project did not succeed. As such, AD acted as a minor social-liberal party, proposing economic liberalism, criticism of the Italian left's statism, and a shake-up of the political system.

AD members were mainly former Republicans and former Socialists, while its founder and leader, Willer Bordon, was a former member of the Italian Communist Party and the Democratic Party of the Left.

The party ran in the 1994 general election within the Alliance of Progressives and obtained a mere 1.2% of the vote, due to the uneasy alliance with the traditional left and the competition by Silvio Berlusconi's Forza Italia, which embraced most of AD's policies. In the 1995 regional elections AD was part of the Pact of Democrats electoral alliance with the Segni Pact and the Italian Socialists. Most AD members continued to be part of the centre-left coalition, with the notable exceptions of Ferdinando Adornato and Giulio Tremonti, who would eventually join Forza Italia.

In the 1996 general election AD was a minor member of The Olive Tree, and evolved into the Democratic Union (UD) with the entry of other Republicans such as Antonio Maccanico, and some Socialists including Giorgio Benvenuto. The UD would be merged into The Democrats in 1999, and Bordon would serve as a minister in 1999–2001.
