= Constitutional laws of Italy =

A constitutional law, in the Italian legal system, is an Act of Parliament that has the same strength as the Constitution of Italy. This means that in case of conflicts between the Constitution and a constitutional law, the latter normally prevails, according to the legal principle that "a later law repeals an earlier law" (lex posterior derogat priori). Constitutional laws that alter or abolish portions of the text of the Constitution are also called leggi di revisione costituzionale (laws amending the Constitution). They are equivalent to amendments to the Constitution of other legal systems (e.g., the United States or Ireland).

== Procedure ==
The Constitution of Italy, as a rigid constitution, overrules other laws and cannot be repealed or amended by them. Article 138 of the Constitution provides for a special procedure for the Parliament to adopt constitutional laws, including laws to amend the Constitution. Compared to other systems with rigid constitutions, the procedure to amend the Constitution of Italy is among the easiest and is a variation of the ordinary legislative procedure.

The ordinary procedure to adopt a law in Italy requires both houses of parliament to approve the law in the same text by a simple majority cast. Constitutional laws start by following the same procedure, but after being approved for the first time, they must be approved by both houses a second time, at least three months later. In the second reading, no new amendments to the bill may be proposed, but the bill must be approved or rejected in its entirety. The constitutional law needs to be approved by a majority in each house in its second reading. Depending on the results of the second vote, the constitutional law may then follow two different paths:

- If the bill is approved by a qualified majority of two thirds of members in both houses, it can be immediately promulgated by the President of Italy and become law.
- If the bill is approved by a majority of members in each house but less than the two-thirds majority, it must first be published in the Official Gazette, the official journal in which all Italian laws are published. Then, within three months after its publication, a constitutional referendum may be requested by 500,000 voters, five regional councils, or one fifth of the members of either house of parliament. If no constitutional referendum has been requested after the three months have elapsed, the bill can be promulgated and becomes law.

=== Constitutional referendum ===
If a constitutional referendum is requested, the bill must be approved by a majority of votes cast by the whole electorate to become law. No quorum is required and so the referendum turnout has no effect on its validity, unlike in other forms of referendums in Italy. Five constitutional referendums have ever been held in Italy. In 2001 and 2020, the constitutional laws were approved. In 2006, 2016, and 2026 they were rejected.

== Limits ==
There are limits to the power of Parliament to amend the Constitution. One is established by Article 139 of the Constitution itself: the form of government of Italy, a republic, cannot be amended. That limit was introduced to protect the result of the institutional referendum in 1946 in which Italians voted to abolish the monarchy. That referendum had been held at the same time as the election of the Constituent Assembly of Italy. The phrase "republican form (of government)" in Article 139 has been interpreted broadly. It is read to mean that the head of state office cannot be hereditary but also the principle of popular sovereignty is encapsulated. In other words, "republic" is interpreted to mean that the Italian Republic is also "democratic".

The Constitutional Court has also stated in multiple judgments (starting with judgments no. 30 and 31 of 1971) that some principles contained in the Constitution are "supreme principles" (principi supremi), which cannot be repealed, even by amending the Constitution. Rights that the Constitution declares to be "inviolable" are examples of those supreme principles.

== List ==
The following table lists all constitutional laws adopted by Parliament since the coming into effect of the Constitution of 1948, including those that were later rejected in constitutional referendums (marked in red). A particular category of constitutional laws is the special statutes of the autonomous regions of Italy. Since they are granted special conditions of autonomy, they are exceptions to the ordinary discipline of the Constitution, and special statutes may be adopted and amended only by constitutional laws. Those constitutional laws are marked in yellow in the table below.

Constitutional Law	Title	Articles amended	Method of approval	Content	Official Gazette
No. 1, 21 February 1947	Extension of the eight-month term provided for in Article 4 of Legislative Decree No. 98,16 March 1946, for the duration of the Constituent Assembly.		Adopted by Constituent Assembly	Extends the term of the Constituent Assembly.	
No. 2, 17 June 1947	Extension of the term provided for in Article 4 of Legislative Decree No. 98,16 March 1946, for the duration of the Constituent Assembly.		Adopted by Constituent Assembly	Extends the term of the Constituent Assembly.	
No. 3, 3 November 1947	Suppression of the Senate and determination of the legal status of its members.		Adopted by Constituent Assembly	Abolishes the Senate of the Kingdom of Italy .	
No. 1, 9 February 1948	Rules regarding judgments on constitutional legitimacy and guarantees of the Constitutional Court's independence.		Adopted by Constituent Assembly	Expands on the rules for judgments in front of the Constitutional Court and on the status of its judges.	
No. 2, 26 February 1948	Conversion into constitutional law of the Statute of the Sicilian Region.		Adopted by Constituent Assembly (Note: Transitory and special provision no. XVII of the Constitution allowed the Constituent Assembly to adopt special regional statutes up until 31 January 1948.)	Adopts as constitutional law the Statute of Sicily approved by Royal Decree No. 455,15 May 1946.	
No. 3, 26 February 1948	Special Statute for Sardinia.		Adopted by Constituent Assembly	Adopts the special Statute for the autonomous region of Sardinia.	
No. 4, 26 February 1948	Special Statute for the Aosta Valley.		Adopted by Constituent Assembly	Adopts the special Statute for the autonomous region of Aosta Valley.	
No. 5, 26 February 1948	Special Statute for Trentino-Alto Adige.		Adopted by Constituent Assembly	Adopts the special Statute for the autonomous region of Trentino-Alto Adige/Südtirol.	
No. 1, 11 March 1953	Supplementary rules to the Constitution regarding the Constitutional Court.		Adopted by Parliament (two-thirds majority)	Expands on the rules regarding the powers of the Constitutional Court and the election of its judges.	
No. 1, 18 March 1958	Due date of “Transitory and Final Provisions,” no. XI		Adopted by Parliament (two-thirds majority)	Establishes 31 December 1963 as the deadline for Transitory and Final Provision no. XI of the Constitution (which provisionally allowed for the creation of new regions without using the procedure of Article 132 of the Constitution).	
No. 1, 9 March 1961	Allocation of three senators to the municipalities of Trieste, Duino Aurisina, Monrupino, Muggia, San Dorligo della Valle, and Sgonico.		Adopted by Parliament (two-thirds majority)	Provisionally creates a new constituency for the election of the Senate, after the annexation of Zone A of the Free Territory of Trieste with the Treaty of Osimo.	
No. 1, 31 January 1963	Special Statute of the region of Friuli-Venezia Giulia.		Adopted by Parliament (two-thirds majority)	Adopts the special Statute for the region of Friuli-Venezia Giulia.	
No. 2, 9 February 1963	Amendments to Articles 56, 57, and 60 of the Constitution.	56, 57, 60	Adopted by Parliament (two-thirds majority)	Fixes the number of elected MPs to 630 deputies and 315 senators (before this reform, their number was variable and depended on the population). Changes the term of the Senate from six to five years, the same as the Chamber of Deputies.	
No. 3, 27 December 1963	Amendments to Articles 131 and 57 of the Constitution and creation of the region of “Molise”.	57, 131	Adopted by Parliament (two-thirds majority)	Splits the region of Abruzzi e Molise into two separate regions: Abruzzo and Molise. The new region of Molise is allocated two senators in the Senate (fewer than the normal minimum of seven established for other regions).	
No. 1, 21 June 1967	Extradition for crimes of genocide.		Adopted by Parliament (two-thirds majority)	Establishes that Article 10, last paragraph, and Article 26, last paragraph, of the Constitution (which prohibit the extradition for political crimes of aliens and citizens respectively) do not apply for crimes of genocide.	
No. 2, 22 November 1967	Amendment to Article 135 of the Constitution and dispositions regarding the Constitutional Court.	135, VII	Adopted by Parliament (two-thirds majority)	Changes the term of the judges of the Constitutional Court from 12 to 9 years and makes them non re-electable. Expands on the rules for the election of the Constitutional Court.	
No. 1, 10 November 1971	Amendments and integrations to the special Statute for Trentino-Alto Adige.		Adopted by Parliament (two-thirds majority)	Amends the special Statute for the region of Trentino-Alto Adige/Südtirol.	
No. 1, 23 February 1972	Amendments to the terms of the Sicilian Regional Assembly and of regional councils of Sardinia, Aosta Valley, Trentino-Alto Adige, and Friuli-Venezia Giulia.		Adopted by Parliament (absolute majority); constitutional referendum not requested	Amends the special Statutes of all five autonomous regions regarding the election of their legislative bodies.	
No. 1, 9 May 1986	Amendment to Article 16 of the special Statute for Sardinia, approved with Constitutional Law no. 3 of 26 February 1948, regarding the definition of the number of members of the Regional Council.		Adopted by Parliament (absolute majority); constitutional referendum not requested	Fixes the number of the members of the Regional Council of Sardinia to 80 (before this reform, their number was variable and depended on the population).	
No. 1, 16 January 1989	Amendments to Articles 96, 134, and 135 of the Constitution and to Constitutional Law no. 1 of 11 March 1953, and rules regarding procedure for crimes under Article 96 of the Constitution.	96, 134, 135	Adopted by Parliament (absolute majority); constitutional referendum not requested	Abolishes the special jurisdiction of the Constitutional Court for crimes committed by prime ministers and ministers. They are now to be tried in front of ordinary courts, but with the consent of the house of parliament they belong to (the Senate if they are not MPs).	
No. 2, 3 April 1989	Call for an advisory referendum to confer a constituent mandate to the European Parliament due to be elected in 1989.		Adopted by Parliament (two-thirds majority)	Allows for an advisory referendum to be called on the question of transforming the European Communities into a European Union and of allowing the European Parliament to draft a European Constitution. A constitutional law was needed because the Constitution does not provide for advisory referendums.	
No. 3, 12 April 1989	Amendments and integrations to Constitutional Law no. 1 of 23 February 1972, regarding the term of office of the Sicilian Regional Assembly and of the regional councils of Sardinia, Aosta Valley, Trentino-Alto Adige, and Friuli-Venezia Giulia. Amendments to the special Statute for the Aosta Valley.		Adopted by Parliament (absolute majority); constitutional referendum not requested	Amends the special Statutes of all five autonomous regions regarding the election of their legislative bodies.	
No. 1, 4 November 1991	Amendment to Article 88, second paragraph, of the Constitution.	88	Adopted by Parliament (two-thirds majority)	Allows for an exception to the rule that the President of Italy cannot dissolve the Parliament during the last six months of their mandate: the prohibition does not apply if this period coincides, even in part, with the last six months of the Parliament's term.	
No. 1, 6 March 1992	Amendment to Article 79 of the Constitution regarding the concession of amnesties and pardons.	79	Adopted by Parliament (absolute majority); constitutional referendum not requested	Introduces a special procedure requiring a qualified majority of two-thirds in each house of parliament to adopt a law that grants amnesties or pardons.	
No. 1, 6 August 1993	Functions of the Parliamentary Committee for Institutional Reforms and rules of the procedure to amend the Constitution.		Adopted by Parliament (absolute majority); constitutional referendum not requested	Gives mandate to a bicameral parliamentary committee to draft a future amendment, regarding the second part of the Constitution and the electoral systems of the legislatures of Italy and ordinary regions.	
No. 2, 23 September 1993	Amendments and integrations to the special Statutes for the Aosta Valley, Sardinia, Friuli-Venezia Giulia, and Trentino-Alto Adige/Südtirol.		Adopted by Parliament (absolute majority); constitutional referendum not requested	Various changes to the special Statutes of four out of five autonomous regions.	
No. 3, 29 September 1993	Amendment to Article 68 of the Constitution.	68	Adopted by Parliament (two-thirds majority)	Grants greater immunities to Members of Parliament and prohibits the interception of Members of Parliament without the consent of the house they belong to.	
No. 1, 24 January 1997	Creation of a Parliamentary Commission for Constitutional Reforms.		Adopted by Parliament (two-thirds majority)	Gives mandate to a bicameral parliamentary committee to draft a future amendment, regarding the second part of the Constitution.	
No. 1, 22 November 1999	Dispositions regarding the direct election of the President of the regional government and the statutory autonomy of the regions.	121, 122, 123, 126	Adopted by Parliament (two-thirds majority)	Grants greater autonomy to regions with ordinary statutes. In particular, ordinary statutes are now regional laws adopted with a special procedure (before the reform, they needed to be converted into law by the Parliament) and the regional governments follow a presidential system with a directly elected President (before the reform, they used a parliamentary model).	
No. 2, 23 November 1999	Addition of the principles of fair trial to Article 111 of the Constitution.	111	Adopted by Parliament (two-thirds majority)	Adds the principles of fair trial to the text of Article 111 of the Constitution.	
No. 1, 17 January 2000	Amendment to Article 48 of the Constitution regarding the creation of the overseas electoral district for the exercise of the right to vote of Italian citizens residing abroad.	48	Adopted by Parliament (absolute majority); constitutional referendum not requested	Creates the overseas electoral district for the election of the Italian Parliament, reserving a number of seats (to be determined with a future constitutional law) in both houses to Italians residing abroad.	
No. 1, 23 January 2001	Amendment to Articles 56 and 57 of the Constitution regarding the number of deputies and senators representing Italians abroad.	56, 57	Adopted by Parliament (absolute majority); constitutional referendum not requested	Allocates 12 seats (out of 630) in the Chamber and 6 seats (out of 315) in the Senate to Italians residing abroad.	
No. 2, 31 January 2001	Dispositions regarding the direct election of the presidents of regions with special statute and of the autonomous provinces of Trento and Bolzano.		Adopted by Parliament (absolute majority); constitutional referendum not requested	Amends the special Statutes of all five autonomous regions. It extends the direct election of the President to all autonomous regions and provinces, except for the autonomous region of Trentino-Alto Adige/Südtirol and the autonomous province of Bolzano.	
No. 3, 18 October 2001	Amendments to Title V of the second part of the Constitution.	114, 115, 116, 117, 118, 119, 120, 123, 124 (abolished), 125 (abolished), 127, 128 (abolished), 129 (abolished), 130 (abolished), 132	Adopted by Parliament (absolute majority); approved by constitutional referendum	Reforms the second part of the Constitution, granting greater powers and autonomy to regions with ordinary statutes. This is most extensive reform to the Constitution to date, amending ten articles and abolishing five.	
No. 1, 23 October 2002	End of the effects of the first and second paragraphs of Transitory and Final Provision no. XIII of the Constitution.	XIII	Adopted by Parliament (absolute majority); constitutional referendum not requested	Ends the effects of the first two paragraphs of Transitory and Final Provision no. XIII of the Constitution (which banishes most members and descendants of the House of Savoy from Italy and prevents them from voting and being elected).	
No. 1, 30 May 2003	Amendment to Article 51 of the Constitution.	51	Adopted by Parliament (absolute majority); constitutional referendum not requested	Imposes an obligation to the Italian Republic to take measures to ensure equal opportunities for women and men in the access to elective offices.	
Published in G.U. no. 269, 18 November 2005	Amendments to the second part of the Constitution.	55, 56, 57, 58, 59, 60, 61, 63, 64, 65, 66, 67, 69, 70, 71, 72, 73, 74, 76, 77, 80, 81, 82, 83, 84, 85, 86, 87, 88, 89, 91, 92, 93, 94, 95, 96, 98, 98-bis (added), 104, 114, 116, 117, 118, 120, 122, 123, 126, 127, 127-bis (added), 127-ter (added), 131, 133, 116, 135, 138	Adopted by Parliament (absolute majority); rejected by constitutional referendum	Overhauls the overall system of government, giving more powers to the Prime Minister, transforming the Senate into a federal chamber, and making the Republic more federal.	
No. 1, 2 October 2007	Amendment to Article 27 of the Constitution, regarding the abolition of the death penalty.	27	Adopted by Parliament (two-thirds majority)	Abolishes the only exception to the ban of the death penalty (that of military laws in time of war).	
No. 1, 20 April 2012	Introduction of the principle of balanced budget in the constitutional chart.	81, 97, 117, 119	Adopted by Parliament (two-thirds majority)	Adds a balanced budget amendment to the Constitution.	
No. 1, 7 February 2013	Amendment to Article 13 of the special Statute of the region of Friuli-Venezia Giulia, Constitutional Law no. 1 of 31 January 1963.		Adopted by Parliament (two-thirds majority)	Amends the special Statute for the region of Friuli-Venezia Giulia, regarding the election of the Regional Council.	
No. 2, 7 February 2013	Amendment to Article 3 of the Statute of the region of Sicily, regarding the reduction of deputies in the Regional Sicilian Assembly. Transitory dispositions.		Adopted by Parliament (two-thirds majority)	Amends the special Statute for the region of Sicily, reducing the members of the Sicilian Assembly.	
No. 3, 7 February 2013	Amendments to Articles 15 and 16 of the special Statute for the region of Sardinia, Constitutional Law no. 1 of 31 January 1963, regarding the composition and election of the Regional Council.		Adopted by Parliament (two-thirds majority)	Amends the special Statute for the region of Sardinia, regarding the composition and election of the Regional Council.	
Published in G.U. no. 88, 15 April 2016	Provisions for overcoming equal bicameralism, reducing the number of Members of Parliament, limiting the operating costs of the institutions, the suppression of the CNEL and the revision of Title V of Part II of the Constitution.	48, 55, 57, 58 (abolished), 59, 60, 61, 62, 63, 64, 66, 67, 69, 70, 71, 72, 73, 74, 75, 77, 78, 79, 80, 81, 82, 83, 85, 86, 87, 88, 94, 96, 97, 99 (abolished), 114, 116, 117, 118, 119, 120, 121, 122, 126, 132, 134, 135	Adopted by Parliament (absolute majority); rejected by constitutional referendum	Overhauls the system of government, making changes to the legislative procedure, to the composition and powers of the Senate, and to the division of powers between State and ordinary regions. Abolishes the provinces (except for the two autonomous provinces of Trento and Bolzano) and the CNEL.	
No. 1, 28 July 2016	Amendments to the special Statute of the region of Friuli-Venezia Giulia, Constitutional Law no. 1 of 31 January 1963, regarding local entities, voting rights to the regional elections, and regional right of initiative.		Adopted by Parliament (two-thirds majority)	Amends the special Statute for the region of Friuli-Venezia Giulia.	
No. 1, 19 October 2020	Amendments to articles 56, 57 and 59 of the Constitution regarding the reduction of the number of parliamentarians.	56, 57, 59	Adopted by Parliament (absolute majority); approved by constitutional referendum	Reduces the number of seats in the Chamber of Deputies from 630 to 400 (8 of whom elected abroad), and the number of seats in the Senate from 315 to 200 (4 of whom elected abroad); the minimum number of senators per region is reduced from 7 to 3 (barring Molise and Valle d'Aosta, which retain 2 and 1, respectively); the number of incumbent senators for life appointed by Presidents of the Republic can never excess 5 in total.	
No. 1, 18 October 2021	Amendment to article 58 of the Constitution regarding senate election.	58	Adopted by Parliament (absolute majority); constitutional referendum not requested	Lowers the age to elect the senators from 25 to 18 years.	
No. 1, 11 February 2022	Amendments to articles 9 and 41 of the Constitution regarding the protection of the environment.	9, 41	Adopted by Parliament (two-thirds majority)	Introduces legal frameworks for the protection of the environment, the biodiversity, and the ecosystems.	
No. 2, 7 November 2022	Amendment to article 119 of the Constitution regarding the recognition of the peculiarities of the islands and the overcoming of the disadvantages caused by insularity	119	Adopted by Parliament (absolute majority); constitutional referendum not requested	Introduces a formal recognition of the disadvantages experienced by Italians who do not live in mainland Italy, with a special focus on the inhabitants of Sicily and Sardinia	

== See also ==
- 2016 Italian constitutional referendum
- 2020 Italian constitutional referendum
- Constitution of Italy
- Politics of Italy
- Regions of Italy
