= 2020 Italian constitutional referendum =

- 20–21 September 2020
- Do you approve the text of the Constitutional Law entitled 'Amendments to articles 56, 57 and 59 of the Constitution concerning the reduction of the number of parliamentarians' approved by Parliament and published in the Official Gazette no. 240 of 12 October 2019?

Results
Choice	Votes	%
Yes	17,913,089	69.96%
No	7,692,007	30.04%
Valid votes	25,605,096	98.29%
Invalid or blank votes	445,130	1.71%
Total votes	26,050,226	100.00%
Eligible to vote/turnout	50,955,985	51.12%
- Results by region

A constitutional referendum about the reduction of the size of the Italian Parliament was held in Italy on 20 and 21 September 2020. Initially scheduled to be held on 29 March, the referendum was postponed following the spread of the coronavirus pandemic in Italy and subsequent lockdown.

Voters were asked whether they approved a constitutional law that would amend the Italian Constitution in various aspects, most notably by reducing the number of MPs in the Parliament from 630 to 400 in the Chamber of Deputies and from 315 to 200 in the Senate. The proposed changes were approved, with 69.96% voting in favour. The reduction in the number of MPs happened at the 2022 Italian general election on 25 September 2022.

This was the second time in Italian history a constitutional referendum was successful, with the 2001 referendum being the first. Two previous constitutional reforms had been rejected by referendums in 2006 and 2016.

== Political background ==
In 2016, the Democratic-led (PD) coalition government proposed a series of constitutional reforms with the aim of reducing the total number of parliamentarians, simplifying the legislative process, limiting the operating costs of the institutions, the disestablishment of the National Council for Economics and Labour (CNEL), and removing the perfect bicameralism in particular by greatly reducing the size and scope of the Senate. The proposal was rejected by 59% of voters through a constitutional referendum, prompting the resignation of the Prime Minister, Matteo Renzi.

In 2019, the PD-Five Star Movement (M5S) coalition government proposed new constitutional reforms which simply called for the reduction of the number of parliamentarians by a third; the bill was approved with the support of all the major political parties on 8 October 2019. The proposal was one of the Five Star Movement's main campaign promises during the 2018 general election, aimed at reducing the costs of politics and slashing privileges for lawmakers. The total reduction in costs was estimated at between 285 and 500 million euros per five-year parliamentary term. The reform was also part of the coalition deal between the PD and M5S. However, critics argued that the savings would be far too small to warrant a reduction in the number of lawmakers, which they believed would decrease democratic representation by lowering the number of lawmakers per 100,000 inhabitants to 1.6 from 1. In comparison, Germany had 0.9:1 ratio, France had a 1.4:1 ratio, and the United Kingdom had a 2.1:1 ratio.

On 10 January 2020, 71 Senators requested a referendum on the reform proposal. Under Article 138 of the Constitution, such request was binding.

== Proposed changes ==
Provinces of Italy (grey borders), within regions (solid borders)

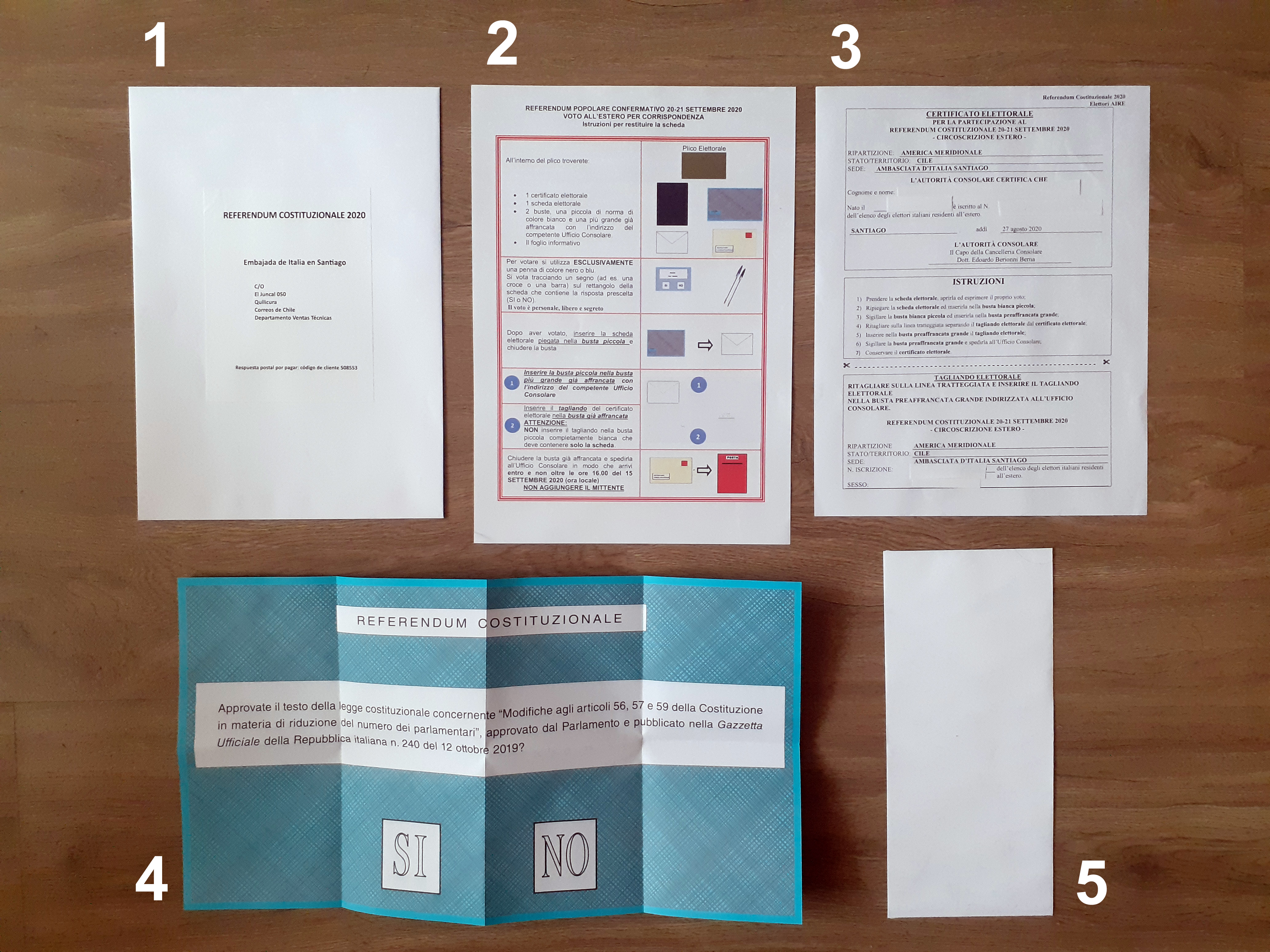
Electoral package sent to an Italian voter in Chile

The proposed constitutional law would amend Article 56 of the Constitution by reducing the number of deputies from 630, twelve of which are elected in the overseas constituencies, to 400, with eight to be elected in the overseas constituencies. According to Paragraph 3 of the Article, the subdivision of seats among the electoral districts is obtained by dividing the number of inhabitants of the country – given by the latest general census of the population – by a factor of 392 (also changed by the new law from the previous factor of 618) and distributing the seats in proportion to the population in each electoral district, on the basis of whole shares and the highest remainders. The number of seats assigned to the overseas constituencies forms an exception to this rule.

The new law would also amend Article 57 of the Constitution by reducing the number of senators from 315, six of which are elected in the overseas constituencies, to 200, with four to be elected in the overseas constituencies. The senators are elected on a regional basis and no region or autonomous province would have fewer than 3 (down from 7) senators, with the exception of Molise and Aosta Valley, which will respectively have two and one senators. Paragraph 4 would also be changed, to state that the subdivision of seats among the regions and autonomous provinces – in accordance with the provisions of the preceding paragraph – is made in proportion to their population given by the latest general census of the population, on the basis of whole shares and the highest remainders.

Article 59 of the Constitution would be changed by limiting the total number of incumbent life senators who can be appointed by the President of Italy to five. Previously, the provision governing the number of life senators was ambiguous, and had been interpreted as allowing each president to appoint five each, cumulating to a total above five.

The changes to Articles 56 and 57 were to take effect after either the end of the incumbent legislature, or at the next dissolution of Parliament, and not earlier than 60 days after the promulgation of the constitutional law.

== Campaign positions ==
The proposed changes to the constitution would reduce the number of seats per electoral district for both chambers of Parliament and thus increase the number of votes required to win a seat. Consequently, they were opposed by most minor parties, with the exception of those who could count on a small but solid electoral base, such as the regional South Tyrolean People's Party, which would see their influence in Parliament increase.

=== Committees ===
Choice	Campaign	Slogan	Spokesperson	Website
Yes	YES of the Liberties!	Il sì delle Libertà	Silvia Ferrara and Pietro Paganini	www.ilsidelleliberta.it
No	NOstra!	NOstra!	Jacopo Ricci	www.comitatonostra.it
No	We NO!	Noi NO	Andrea Pruiti Ciarello	noino.eu
No	Democrats for the No	Democratici per il No	Giovanni Lattanzi	democraticiperilno.it
No	Solidary Network in defense of the Constitution	Rete Solidale in difesa della Costituzione	Marina Calamo Specchia	—N/a
No	Popular Committee for the No to the parliamentarians cut	Comitato popolare per il No al taglio dei parlamentari	Piero Pirovano	iovotono.eu
No	3 Reasons for the No	3 motivi per il No	Stefano D'Andrea	3-motivi-per-il-no0.webnode.it
No	Committee for the NO on changes to the Constitution to reduce the number of parliamentarians	Comitato per il NO sulle modifiche alla Costituzione per la riduzione del numero dei Parlamentari	Massimo Villone	coordinamentodemocraziacostituzionale.it noaltagliodelparlamento.it
No	Committee for the NO to the Counter-reform	Comitato per il No alla Controriforma	Massimiliano Iervolino	radicali.it/campagne/no-alla-controriforma/
No	LET'S START WITH NO — Committee for the NO to the referendum on the cut of parliamentarians	COMINCIAMO DAL NO — Comitato per il NO al referendum sul taglio dei parlamentari	Simona Viola	piueuropa.eu/2020/02/22/comitatodelno/

=== Political parties ===
Choice	Parties	Political orientation	Leader	Ref
Yes	League (Lega)	Right-wing populism	Matteo Salvini	
Yes	Five Star Movement (M5S)	Populism	Luigi Di Maio	
Yes	Democratic Party (PD)	Social democracy	Nicola Zingaretti	
Yes	Brothers of Italy (FdI)	National conservatism	Giorgia Meloni	
Yes	Article One (Art. 1)	Social democracy	Roberto Speranza	
Yes	South Tyrolean People's Party (SVP)	Regionalism	Arno Kompatscher	
Yes	Cambiamo! (C!)	Liberal conservatism	Giovanni Toti	
Yes	Die Freiheitlichen	Tyrolean Separatism	Otto Mahlknecht	
Yes	Fatherland and Constitution (PeC)	Left-wing nationalism	Stefano Fassina	
Yes	Party of Venetians (PdV)	Venetian nationalism	Alessio Morosin	
Yes	Valdostan Union (UV)	Autonomism Regionalism	Érik Lavévaz	
No official party position	Italia Viva (IV)	Liberalism	Matteo Renzi	
No official party position	Forza Italia (FI)	Liberal conservatism	Silvio Berlusconi	
No	Action (Azione)	Social liberalism	Carlo Calenda	
No	Italian Left (SI)	Democratic socialism	Nicola Fratoianni	
No	More Europe (+Eu)	Liberalism	Benedetto Della Vedova	
No	Federation of the Greens (FdV)	Green politics	collective leadership	
No	Italia in Comune (IiC)	Progressivism	Federico Pizzarotti	
No	Power to the People (PaP)	Socialism	Viola Carofalo	
No	Italian Socialist Party (PSI)	Social democracy	Enzo Maraio	
No	Energies for Italy (EpI)	Liberalism	Stefano Parisi	
No	Volt Italia	European federalism	Federica Vinci	
No	Associative Movement Italians Abroad (MAIE)	Interests of Italians abroad	Ricardo Antonio Merlo	
No	South American Union Italian Emigrants (USEI)	Interests of Italians abroad	Eugenio Sangregorio	
No	Communist Party (PC)	Communism	Marco Rizzo	
No	Democratic Centre (CD)	Christian left	Bruno Tabacci	
No	Communist Refoundation Party (PRC)	Communism	Maurizio Acerbo	
No	Christian Democracy (DC)	Christian democracy	Renato Grassi	
No	Italian Communist Party (PCI)	Communism	Mauro Alboresi	
No	Pact for Autonomy (PpA)	Autonomism	Massimo Moretuzzo	
No	Italian Marxist–Leninist Party (PMLI)	Maoism	Giovanni Scuderi	
No	Trentino Tyrolean Autonomist Party (PATT)	Autonomism Regionalism	Simone Marchiori	
No	Venetian Left (Sanca)	Autonomism Venetian nationalism	Andrea Mion	
No	Union for Trentino (UpT)	Autonomism Christian Democracy	Annalisa Caumo	

== Opinion polls ==
Date	Polling firm	Sample size	Total				Considering only Yes/No vote		
Date	Polling firm	Sample size	Yes	No	None / Don't know	Lead	Yes	No	Lead
2–4 Sep 2020	SWG	1,000	70.0	30.0	—N/a	40.0	70.0	30.0	40.0
1–3 Sep 2020	Ixè	1,000	51.3	17.9	30.8	33.4	74.1	25.9	48.2
1–3 Sep 2020	Ipsos	1,000	58.9	24.1	17.0	34.8	71.0	29.0	42.0
31 Aug 2020	Euromedia	—N/a	42.0	15.8	42.2	24.2	72.7	27.3	45.4
23–27 Aug 2020	BiDiMedia	1,661	71.0	29.0	—N/a	42.0	71.0	29.0	42.0
24–26 Aug 2020	Demos & Pi	1,014	82.0	18.0	—N/a	64.0	82.0	18.0	64.0
14–17 Aug 2020	Lab2101	1,000	72.4	27.6	—N/a	44.8	72.4	27.6	44.8
22–23 Jul 2020	Ipsos	1,000	49.0	8.0	43.0	41.0	86.0	14.0	72.0
23–25 Jun 2020	Ipsos	1,000	46.0	10.0	44.0	36.0	82.0	18.0	64.0
20–22 Feb 2020	Piepoli	503	81.0	9.0	10.0	72.0	90.0	10.0	80.0
13 Jan 2020	Euromedia	800	75.1	10.7	14.2	64.4	87.5	12.5	75.0
9–14 Dec 2019	Demos&Pi	1,212	86.0	12.0	2.0	74.0	86.0	14.0	72.0
8 Oct 2019	The Parliament approves the constitutional reform bill								
7–8 Oct 2019	Demopolis	1,500	80.0	12.0	8.0	68.0	87.0	13.0	74.0

== Results ==
A facsimile of the electoral ballot

The referendum resulted in a victory of the "Yes" with a majority of 70.0% of the vote. The voter turnout was 51.12%. The "Yes" was the winning choice by a large margin in all Italian regions.

Luigi Di Maio, foreign minister and former leader of the M5S, defined the results "a historical result". The secretary of the PD, Nicola Zingaretti, said that "the victory of the 'Yes' opens up a season of reforms". Riccardo Molinari, party leader of the League in the Chamber of Deputies, asked for parliament to be dissolved and new elections to be held, in order to fulfill the objective of the constitutional law.

Choice	Votes	%
For	17,913,259	69.96
Against	7,691,837	30.04
Total	25,605,096	100.00
Valid votes	25,605,096	98.29
Invalid/blank votes	445,131	1.71
Total votes	26,050,227	100.00
Registered voters/turnout	50,955,985	51.12
Source: Ministry of the Interior

Popular vote
Yes	69.96%
No	30.04%

=== Results by region ===
The "Yes" side was in the majority in every region and in all four overseas constituencies. Support was lowest in Friuli-Venezia Giulia, with 59.57% in favor. Molise was the region with the highest support, at 79.89%, though two of the overseas constituencies had higher support.

Region	Votes		%	
Region	Yes	No	Yes	No
Aosta Valley	48,165	22,708	67.96	32.04
Piedmont	1,172,338	541,183	68.42	31.58
Liguria	430,354	255,804	63.78	36.22
Lombardy	2,609,444	1,221,310	68.12	31.88
Trentino-Alto; Adige/Südtirol	390,490	160,389	70.88	29.12
Veneto	1,553,218	934,313	62.44	37.56
Friuli-Venezia; Giulia	281,042	190,743	59.57	40.43
Emilia-Romagna	1,273,585	557,716	69.55	30.45
Tuscany	1,216,952	627,949	65.96	34.04
Marche	533,479	237,569	69.19	30.81
Umbria	221,989	101,062	68.72	31.28
Lazio	1,307,304	677,693	65.86	34.14
Abruzzo	384,500	136,885	73.75	26.25
Molise	93,178	23,456	79.89	20.11
Campania	2,087,311	609,290	77.41	22.59
Apulia	1,477,164	486,614	75.22	24.78
Basilicata	169,024	53,856	75.84	24.16
Calabria	521,444	151,138	77.53	22.47
Sicily	1,055,351	335,397	75.88	24.12
Sardinia	322,200	159,843	66.84	33.16
Total	17,168,532	7,484,918	69.64	30.36

Abroad constituency	Votes		%	
Abroad constituency	Yes	No	Yes	No
North and Central; Americas	62,644	14,632	81.07	18.93
South America	226,522	78,819	74.19	25.81
Europe	422,616	105,168	80.07	19.93
Africa, Asia, Oceania, Antarctica	32,775	8,470	79.46	20.54
Total	744,557	207,089	78.24	21.76

=== Turnout ===
Area	Time			
Area	20 Sep			21 Sep
Area	12:00	19:00	23:00	15:00
Nationwide
Italy	12.25%	29.70%	39.38%	53.84%
Abruzzo	10.61%	27.31%	36.47%	50.79%
Basilicata	9.40%	24.36%	36.96%	50.14%
Calabria	8.62%	22.44%	32.42%	45.18%
Campania	12.46%	29.36%	42.78%	61.04%
Emilia-Romagna	14.16%	32.99%	41.59%	55.37%
Friuli-Venezia Giulia	12.40%	28.31%	36.34%	50.22%
Lazio	10.87%	25.25%	33.06%	45.65%
Liguria	15.43%	35.47%	44.04%	59.15%
Lombardy	12.43%	30.91%	39.01%	51.36%
Marche	14.90%	36.65%	47.56%	66.38%
Molise	9.76%	24.18%	33.33%	47.48%
Piedmont	12.02%	30.69%	38.81%	51.56%
Apulia	13.22%	30.28%	43.74%	61.91%
Sardinia	7.76%	17.02%	23.41%	35.70%
Sicily	6.41%	16.96%	24.78%	35.38%
Tuscany	15.44%	38.17%	48.29%	65.88%
Trentino-Alto Adige	16.04%	40.50%	54.42%	70.94%
Umbria	9.56%	25.16%	33.09%	48.75%
Aosta Valley	18.24%	44.35%	56.37%	72.44%
Veneto	16.31%	39.27%	51.04%	67.54%
Abroad
Abroad	—N/a	—N/a	—N/a	23.30%
Africa, Asia, Oceania, Antarctica	—N/a	—N/a	—N/a	19.75%
South America	—N/a	—N/a	—N/a	23.95%
North and Central Americas	—N/a	—N/a	—N/a	22.49%
Europe	—N/a	—N/a	—N/a	23.39%
Source: Ministry of the Interior – Turnout
