= Referendums in Italy =

A referendum, in the Italian legal system is a request directed to the whole electorate to express their view on a determined question. It is the main instrument of direct democracy in Italy. The Constitution of Italy only provides for four types of legally binding referendums:

- A popular referendum, in which the electorate is called to vote on whether they wish to abolish (abrogate) an existing law, either totally or partially.
- A constitutional referendum, which can be requested in some cases when a new constitutional law is approved by Parliament. Similarly, a referendum can be requested to confirm the adoption of the Statute of ordinary regions.
- An advisory referendum is required to approve the modification of regions, provinces, or municipalities.
- A popular referendum on regional laws and regulations may be regulated by regional statutes.

Despite that the constitutional right to hold a popular referendum has existed since adoption of the Constitution in 1948, the necessary legislation detailing the bureaucratic procedures needed to hold them was not adopted until the early 1970s. As a consequence of this, Italy's first popular referendum was not held until 1974, 27 years after the constitution was first approved.

== Popular referendum ==
=== Requirements ===
A popular referendum can only be called at the request of five Regional Councils or 500,000 Italian voters. A popular referendum can only be asked to abolish an existing law (or part of it); a referendum to adopt new legislation is not provided for by the Constitution. Some matters are not subject to popular referendum: tax laws, budget laws, amnesties and pardons, and laws that authorize the ratification of international treaties. While these are the limits expressly stated by the Constitution, the Constitutional Court has identified further limitations.

The petition, which must include the question of the referendum, must be deposited at the Court of Cassation, which is called to examine the validity of the petition. The Constitutional Court of Italy verifies the regularity of signatures (in case the referendum was requested by the voters) and of the question of the referendum. The court has the power to reject it outright. Many fully valid petitions with the necessary 500,000 signatures have never been accepted as referendums precisely for this reason.

If the Court of Cassation judges the petition to be valid, the referendum question must then be evaluated by the Constitutional Court, which is called to judge its admissibility. Unlike the Court of Cassation, which considers the conformity of the petition to ordinary law, the reference for the Constitutional Court's judgment is the Constitution.

If the Constitutional Court deems the referendum admissible, the President of the Republic has to set a date for the vote between 15 April and 15 June.

The final hurdle is that the result of the legislative referendum is only valid if at least a majority of all eligible voters go to the polling station and cast their ballot. If this quorum is not met, the referendum is invalid (which, in practice, means the law is not abolished).

==== Electronic signatures ====
The 2021 Italian budget law authorized for the collection of electronic signatures through a government run online platform, managed through the Italian online digital ID system SPID. Although the platform is not online, starting on 1 July 2021 citizens have been able to add signatures to referendums through a provisional process.

The new process has been noted for the speed at which it can collect signatures for referendums, with a referendum to decriminalize marijuana collecting 330,000 signatures in three days in due in large part to digital signatures.

=== Political party use ===
The political party in Italy that is most closely associated with, and has made most use of, referendums in the last 40 years is the Radical Party led by Marco Pannella. They hold the record for most referendums presented. Despite only receiving around 2.5% of the popular vote in most national elections, the numerous referendums they have proposed over the years have often mobilised the entire Italian political spectrum in support or opposition. They will often use unconventional methods such as prolonged hunger strikes and/or thirst strikes by their leaders to draw attention to their cause. Their largest political battles came in the 1970s and 80's when they successfully campaigned for the right to divorce and the right to abortion.

Other groups have also made use of referendums to raise the profile of their own small political parties or their leaders or to raise awareness of their respective political agendas. Signatures for referendums have been collected by parties across the political spectrum from the Northern League opposing a law on immigration in 1998 (this was ruled as inadmissible by the constitutional court when presented), all the way to the Italy of Values party when leader Antonio Di Pietro collected signatures in 1998 for a change in the electoral law to a full first past the post system. The Italian radical party and the right wing National Alliance were also collecting signatures for the same exact petition on electoral reform at the same time as Di Pietro's party, showing that often parties from vastly different political beliefs will agree on the same themes that they feel should be subject to referendums.

However, often political parties who are even in the same coalition will have very diverse opinions with regard to referendums. A notorious example of this came in 1999 when the right-wing National Alliance, led by Gianfranco Fini, was collecting signatures for two referendums to abolish political party state financing and a change in electoral law to a full first past the post system, while the Italian Radicals and Di Pietro's Italy of Values were also collecting signatures at the same time. Despite spending an enormous amount of manpower and party funds across all of Italy, his main partner in the House of Freedoms coalition, Forza Italia, led by former and soon to be Prime Minister Silvio Berlusconi, offered no political or financial support. When voting for the referendums took place in 2000, Berlusconi almost abstained and said the vote was "mostly pointless" as he would take care of all reforms when he would return to power.

When the House of Liberties coalition returned to power in 2001, Berlusconi did not abolish political party financing and even reintroduced proportional representation into the electoral law. Critics pointed out that these new measures, approved even with the parliamentary votes of Alleanza Nazionale itself, were proof that Fini and his party had made a complete volte-face and abandoned some of their core political reforms in order to stay in power. It was also seen as proof that Fini's influence in the coalition was not as strong as many were led to believe.

== Constitutional referendum ==
A constitutional referendum can be requested by 500,000 voters, five regional councils, or one-fifth of the members of a house of parliament when Parliament adopts a constitutional law (including a law to amend the constitution) with an absolute majority in the second vote, but without meeting a two-thirds qualified majority in each house. The referendum must be requested within three months from the publication of the bill in the Official Gazette.

Unlike a popular referendum, a constitutional referendum is confirmatory. This means a "Yes" vote is a vote in support of the constitutional law, whereas a "Yes" in a popular referendum is a vote for abolishing the law. Also unlike popular referendums, constitutional referendums are not subject to a quorum, meaning they are valid regardless of the turnout. Italy has had five constitutional referendums in the history of the republic; two of which were approved (2001 and 2020), and three of which were rejected (2006, 2016, and 2026).

== Ad hoc referendums ==
Before the adoption of the Constitution of 1948, a unique referendum (called referendum on the institutional form of the State or institutional referendum in Italian) was held on 2 June 1946. Italians were asked to vote on the future form of government of Italy: retain the monarchy or become a republic. The republic vote won 54.3% to 45.7%.

A special advisory referendum was held in 1989, on the question of transforming the European Communities into a European Union and of allowing the European Parliament to draft a European Constitution. This referendum was made possible by Constitutional Law no. 2 of 3 April 1989, which specifically provided for this referendum to be held.

== List of referendums ==
Overall, Italians have been called on to decide on 72 national referendums: 67 popular referendums, 3 constitutional referendums, and the 2 ad hoc referendums described above. They approved 25 of them, rejected 18, and 28 were declared invalid because of low turnout.

=== Referendum on the institutional form of the State ===
Year	Objective	Results		Turnout	Outcome
Year	Objective	Republic	Monarchy	Turnout	Outcome
1946	Retaining the monarchy of the House of Savoy or establishing a Republic.	54.27%	45.73%	89.08%	Republic

=== Popular referendums ===
Year	Objective	Result		Turnout	Outcome
Year	Objective	Yes	No	Turnout	Outcome
1974	Repealing the Divorce Law.	40.74%	59.26%	87.72%	Rejected
1978	Repealing a law that gave more power to the law enforcement but reduced civil rights.	23.54%	76.46%	81.19%	Rejected
1978	Ending government funding for political parties.	43.59%	56.41%	81.19%	Rejected
1981	Liberalising abortion laws.	11.6%	88.4%	79.41%	Rejected
1981	Prohibiting abortion.	32.0%	68.0%	79.43%	Rejected
1981	Repealing the Reale Law regarding law enforcement and public order.	14.9%	85.1%	79.38%	Rejected
1981	Reject life imprisonment as the capital punishment.	22.6%	77.4%	79.43%	Rejected
1981	Repeal the gun license law.	14.1%	85.9%	79.42%	Rejected
1985	Restore the sliding wage scale	45.68%	54.32%	77.85%	Rejected
1987	Abolish power of the state to oblige local administrations to accept new nuclear plants.	88.0%	11.0%	65.10%	Approved
1987	Abolish rewards for local administrations accepting nuclear / coal plants.	88.6%	11.4%	65,10%	Approved
1987	Abolish authorization for ENEL to build nuclear plants abroad.	84.0%	16.0%	65.09%	Approved
1987	Abolish law excluding responsibility for judicial errors.	80.2%	19.8%	65.11%	Approved
1987	Abolish law excluding ministers from prosecution.	85.0%	15.0%	65.10%	Approved
1990	Repealing the law restricting hunting.	92.2%	7.8%	43.36%	Quorum not met
1990	Repealing the law allowing hunting on private properties.	92.3%	7.7%	42.92%	Quorum not met
1990	Repealing limits set by the Italian Ministry of Health on pesticides.	93.5%	6.5%	43.11%	Quorum not met
1991	Repealing the law on the number of preference votes.	95.57%	4.43%	62.50%	Approved
1993	Environmental powers of local health units.	82.5%	17.5%	76.85%	Approved
1993	Use of medicinal drugs.	55.3%	44.7%	76.98%	Approved
1993	Political party financing law.	90.3%	9.7%	76.95%	Approved
1993	Administration of public banks.	89.8%	10.2%	76.87%	Approved
1993	Electoral law for Senate.	82.7%	17.3%	77.01%	Approved
1993	Abolition of Ministry of Agriculture.	70.1%	29.9%	76.89%	Approved
1993	Abolition of State Holdings Ministry.	90.1%	9.9%	76.86%	Approved
1993	Abolition of Ministry of Tourism and Entertainment.	82.2%	17.8%	76.88%	Approved
1995	Union representation law (1).	49.97%	50.03%	57.22%	Rejected
1995	Union representation law (2).	62.1%	37.9%	57.17%	Approved
1995	Union dues deduction.	56.2%	43.8%	57.27%	Approved
1995	Collective contracts public sector.	64.7%	35.3%	57.36%	Approved
1995	Internal exile of mafia members.	63.7%	36.3%	57.25%	Approved
1995	Public ownership of RAI.	54.9%	45.1%	57.38%	Approved
1995	Commercial licences.	35.6%	64.4%	57.24%	Rejected
1995	TV channel concessions.	43.0%	57.0%	58.06%	Rejected
1995	Advertising breaks in films.	44.3%	55.7%	58.12%	Rejected
1995	TV publicity grouping.	43.6%	56.4%	58.07%	Rejected
1995	Shop opening hours.	37.5%	62.5%	57.34%	Rejected
1995	Local council elections.	49.4%	50.6%	57.40%	Rejected
1997	Golden share privatisation.	74.1%	25.9%	30.15%	Quorum not met
1997	Conscientious objectors.	71.7%	28.3%	30.29%	Quorum not met
1997	Hunters access to private land.	80.9%	19.1%	30.21%	Quorum not met
1997	Judges careers.	83.6%	16.4%	30.15%	Quorum not met
1997	Order of Journalists.	65.5%	34.5%	30.04%	Quorum not met
1997	Judges second jobs.	85.6%	14.4%	30.20%	Quorum not met
1997	Ministry of Agrarian Politics.	66.9%	33.1%	30.05%	Quorum not met
1999	Abolition of mixed-member proportional representation for 25% of seats in the Chamber of Deputies.	91.52%	8.48%	49.58%	Quorum not met
2000	Election spending reimbursement.	71.1%	28.9%	32.19%	Quorum not met
2000	Proportional seats electoral law.	82.0%	18.0%	32.44%	Quorum not met
2000	Election of Superior Council judges.	70.6%	29.4%	31.86%	Quorum not met
2000	Separation of magistrates careers.	69.0%	31.0%	31.96%	Quorum not met
2000	Judges holding other positions.	75.2%	24.8%	31.99%	Quorum not met
2000	Re-employment law for companies >15 workers.	33.4%	66.6%	32.51%	Quorum not met
2000	Automatic union dues.	61.8%	38.2%	32.20%	Quorum not met
2003	Re-employment of illegitimately fired workers in small companies.	86.7%	13.3%	25.73%	Quorum not met
2003	Electricity cables on private property.	85.6%	14.4%	25.75%	Quorum not met
2005	Embryo research limits.	88.0%	12.0%	25.66%	Quorum not met
2005	Access to embryo research.	88.8%	11.2%	25.66%	Quorum not met
2005	Legal definition of embryos.	87.7%	12.3%	25.65%	Quorum not met
2005	IVF with donated sperm.	78.2%	21.8%	25.63%	Quorum not met
2009	Abolition of the connection between lists and of the majority bonus to the winning coalition in the Chamber of Deputies.	77.64%	22.36%	23,49%	Quorum not met
2009	Abolition of the connection between lists and of the majority bonus to the winning coalition in the Senate.	77.69%	22.31%	23.52%	Quorum not met
2009	Abolition of the possibility for a candidate to stand for election in more than one constituency in the national general elections.	87.00%	13.00%	24.02%	Quorum not met
2011	Privatization of water services.	94.6%	5.4%	54.81%	Approved
2011	Nuclear power development.	94.3%	5.7%	54.79%	Approved
2011	Public utilities regulation about.	95.0%	5.0%	54.82%	Approved
2011	Election rules modification.	95.4%	4.6%	54.78%	Approved
2016	Oil / gas drilling concessions within 12 nautical miles.	85.85%	14.15%	31.19%	Quorum not met
2022	Repealing Severino Law.	53.97%	46.3%	20.42%	Quorum not met
2022	Limitation on pre-trial detention.	56.12%	43.88%	20.41%	Quorum not met
2022	Separation of careers for judges and prosecutors.	74.01%	25.99%	20.41%	Quorum not met
2022	Lay members in magistrate evaluation.	71.94%	28.07%	20.40%	Quorum not met
2022	Remove endorsement requirement for candidates.	72.52%	27.48%	20.40%	Quorum not met
2025	Repealing limitations on reinstatement following unlawful dismissal.	87.57%	12.43%	29.83%	Quorum not met
2025	Repealing constraints on judicial discretion in employment termination cases.	86.02%	13.98%	29.83%	Quorum not met
2025	Repealing of liberalized use of fixed-term agency employment.	87.53%	12.47%	29.83%	Quorum not met
2025	Repealing joint liability provisions for workplace accidents in subcontracting.	85.78%	14.22%	29.84%	Quorum not met
2025	Repealing extended requirements for acquiring Italian citizenship.	65.34%	34.66%	29.85%	Quorum not met

=== Constitutional referendums ===
Year	Objective	Result		Turnout	Outcome
Year	Objective	Yes	No	Turnout	Outcome
2001	Seeking of amending the constitution to give more powers to the regions of Italy.	64.21%	35.79%	34.05%	Approved
2006	Transformation of Italy from a unitary state into a federal republic.	38.71%	61.29%	52.46%	Rejected
2016	Seeking approval of amending a constitutional law to reform the composition and powers of the Parliament of Italy.	40.88%	59.81%	65.48%	Rejected
2020	Reducing the number of members of Parliament from 630 to 400 in the Chamber of Deputies, and from 315 to 200 in the Senate.	69.96%	30.04%	51.12%	Approved
2026	Provisions on the Judicial System and the establishment of the Disciplinary Court for judges.	46.76%	53.24%	55.69%	Rejected

=== Advisory referendum ===
Year	Objective	Result		Turnout	Outcome
Year	Objective	Yes	No	Turnout	Outcome
1989	Support to the process of European integration by expanding the powers of the European Economic Community	88.07%	11.97%	80.86%	Approved
