= Government of Italy =

Italian Government
- Italian: Governo Italiano
- Central government
- Logo of the Italian Government

Overview
- Established: 2 June 1946; 80 years ago
- State: Italy
- Leader: Prime Minister
- Appointed by: President
- Main organ: Council of Ministers
- Ministries: 17
- Responsible to: Italian Parliament
- Headquarters: Chigi Palace; 370 Piazza Colonna, Rome
- Website: www.governo.it

The Government of Italy (formally known as the Italian Government) is the central executive authority of Italy. The Italian government is that of a democratic republic, established by the Italian constitution in 1948. It consists of legislative, executive, and judicial subdivisions, as well as of a head of state, known as the president.

The Constitution of the Italian Republic was created by the Constituent Assembly, which was formed by the representatives of all the anti-fascist forces that contributed to the defeat of the Nazis and fascist forces during the Italian Civil War and the Common Man's Front. Article 1 of the Italian constitution states:

"Italy is a democratic Republic founded on labour. Sovereignty belongs to the people and is exercised by the people in the forms and within the limits of the constitution."

By stating that Italy is a democratic republic, the article solemnly declares the results of the institutional referendum that took place on 2 June 1946 valid. The state is not the hereditary property of the ruling monarch, but instead a res publica, belonging to everyone.

The people who are called to temporarily administer the republic are not owners, but servants; and the governed are not subjects, but citizens. And the sovereignty, that is the power to make choices that involve the entire community, belongs to the people, in accordance with the concept of a democracy, from the Greek demos (people) and kratìa (power). However, this power is not to be exercised arbitrarily by mob rule, but in the forms and within the limits established by the rule of law.

== Head of state ==
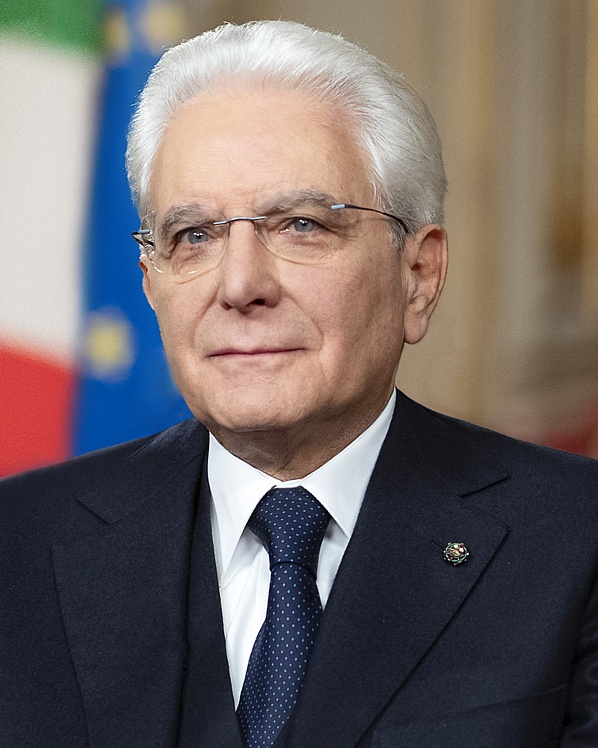
Sergio Mattarella, the president of Italy since 3 February 2015

The president of the Republic of Italy is the head of state and represents the unity of the nation (art. 87 of the Constitution). The president serves as a point of connection between the three branches as he is elected by the lawmakers, appoints the executive and is the president of the judiciary. The president is also commander-in-chief in time of war.

The president of the Republic of Italy is elected for seven years by Parliament in joint session, together with three representatives of each region, except for the Aosta Valley, which gets only one representative. These delegates are elected by their respective regional councils so as to guarantee representation to minorities. The election needs a wide majority that is progressively reduced from two-thirds to one-half plus one of the votes after the third ballot. The only presidents ever to be elected on the first ballot are Francesco Cossiga and Carlo Azeglio Ciampi. Ciampi was replaced by Giorgio Napolitano, who was elected on 10 May 2006. While not forbidden by the law, no president had ever served two terms until 20 April 2013, when President Giorgio Napolitano was re-elected.

According to the constitution, any citizen who is 50 years old on the day of the election, and enjoys civil and political rights, can be elected president. The president cannot hold office in any other branch of power and the office's salary and privileges are established by law.

Among the powers of the president, they have the capacity to:

- Send messages to the parliament, authorize the introduction of bills by the government, and promulgate laws, decrees and regulations.
- Dissolve one or both houses of parliament, in consultation with their presidents, except during the last six months of his term, unless that period coincides at least in part with the final six months of the parliament.
- Call a general referendum under certain circumstances established by the constitution.
- Appoint state officials in the cases established by the law.
- Accredit and receive diplomats, and ratify international treaties, after the parliament's authorization when required.
- Make declarations of war agreed upon by the parliament, as commander-in-chief of the armed forces.
- Grant pardons, commute sentences, and confer the orders, decorations, and medals of Italy.

The president also presides over the High Council of the Judiciary and the Supreme Council of Defence. Usually, the president tries to stay out of the day-to-day politics, and tries to be an institutional guarantee for all those involved in the political process. The president is not responsible for the actions performed in the exercise of his duties, except for high treason and violation of the Italian constitution, for which the president can be impeached by the parliament in joint session, with an absolute majority of its members.

== Legislative branch ==
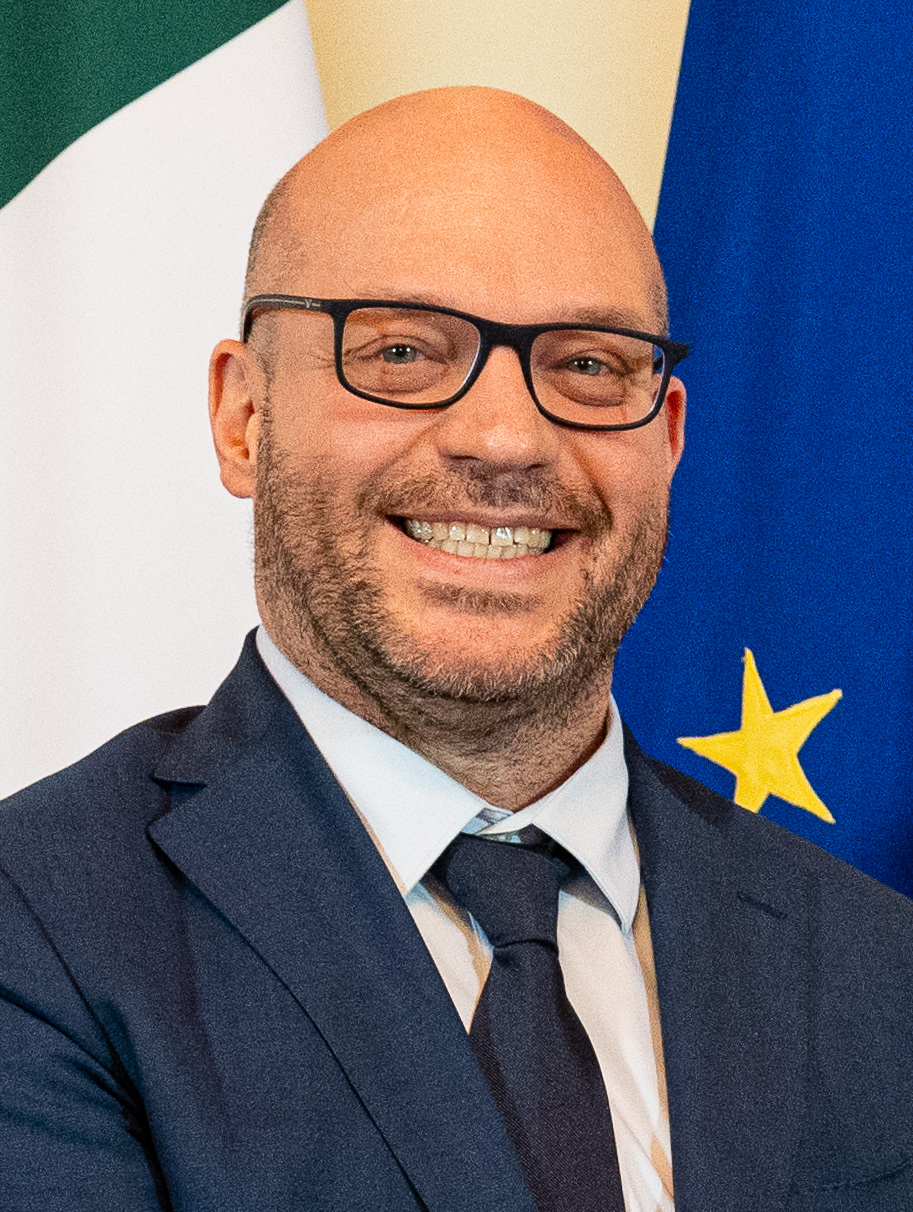
Lorenzo Fontana, the president of the Chamber of Deputies since 14 October 2022

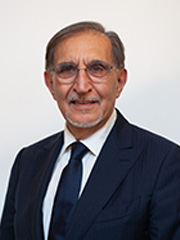
Ignazio La Russa, the president of the Senate since 13 October 2022

With article 48 of the constitution, which guarantees the right to vote, the people exercise their power through their elected representatives in the parliament. The Italian Parliament has a bicameral system, and consists of the Chamber of Deputies and the Senate of the Republic, elected every five years.

The Chamber of Deputies is elected by direct and universal suffrage by voters who are eighteen or older. There are 400 deputies, eight of which are elected in the overseas constituencies. All voters who are twenty-five or older on election day are eligible to be deputies.

The senate is elected by direct and universal suffrage by voters who are eighteen or older. There are 200 senators, four of whom are elected in the overseas constituencies. There are also a small number of senators for life, such as former presidents and up to five citizens appointed by the president for having brought honor to the nation with their achievements. All voters who are forty or older on election day are eligible to be senators. Elections of senators for each region being based on a modified proportional representation system.

== Executive branch ==
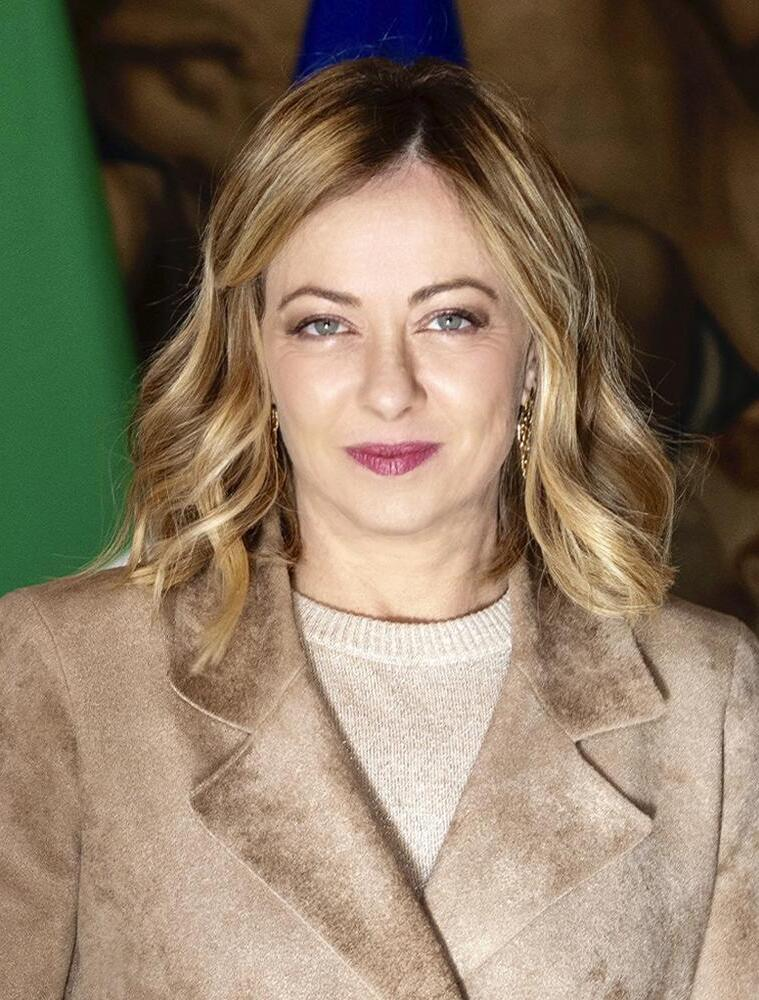
Giorgia Meloni, the prime minister of Italy since 22 October 2022

The constitution establishes the Government of Italy as composed of the president of the Council of Ministers (prime minister) and the cabinet's ministers. The President of Italy appoints the prime minister and, on the prime minister's proposal, the subsequent ministers that form their cabinet. The appointee is usually the leader of the majority coalition that won the election (e.g. Berlusconi IV Cabinet), but they can also be a new leader emerging from a post-election leadership challenge within the majority coalition (e.g. Renzi Cabinet), or a person instructed by the president to form a national unity government in times of political crisis, such as in a coalition shift (e.g. Conte II Cabinet), or if enough politicians from the majority coalition switch parties (e.g. Monti Cabinet). In any scenario, the government must receive the confidence of both houses, so the executive branch derives its legitimacy from the Italian Parliament and the great number of political parties forces the prime minister to bend to their will.

If the majority coalition no longer supports the government, the prime minister can be ousted with a vote of no confidence, at which point the president can either appoint a new Prime Minister capable of forming a government with the support of Parliament, or dissolve parliament and call for new elections. Cabinet reshuffles are also possible in case specific ministers lack the support of the parliament, while the prime minister remains in charge. In the history of the Italian Republic, there have been twenty legislatures (including the Constituent Assembly), forty-five consecutive premierships, and sixty-eight different cabinets.

== Judicial branch ==
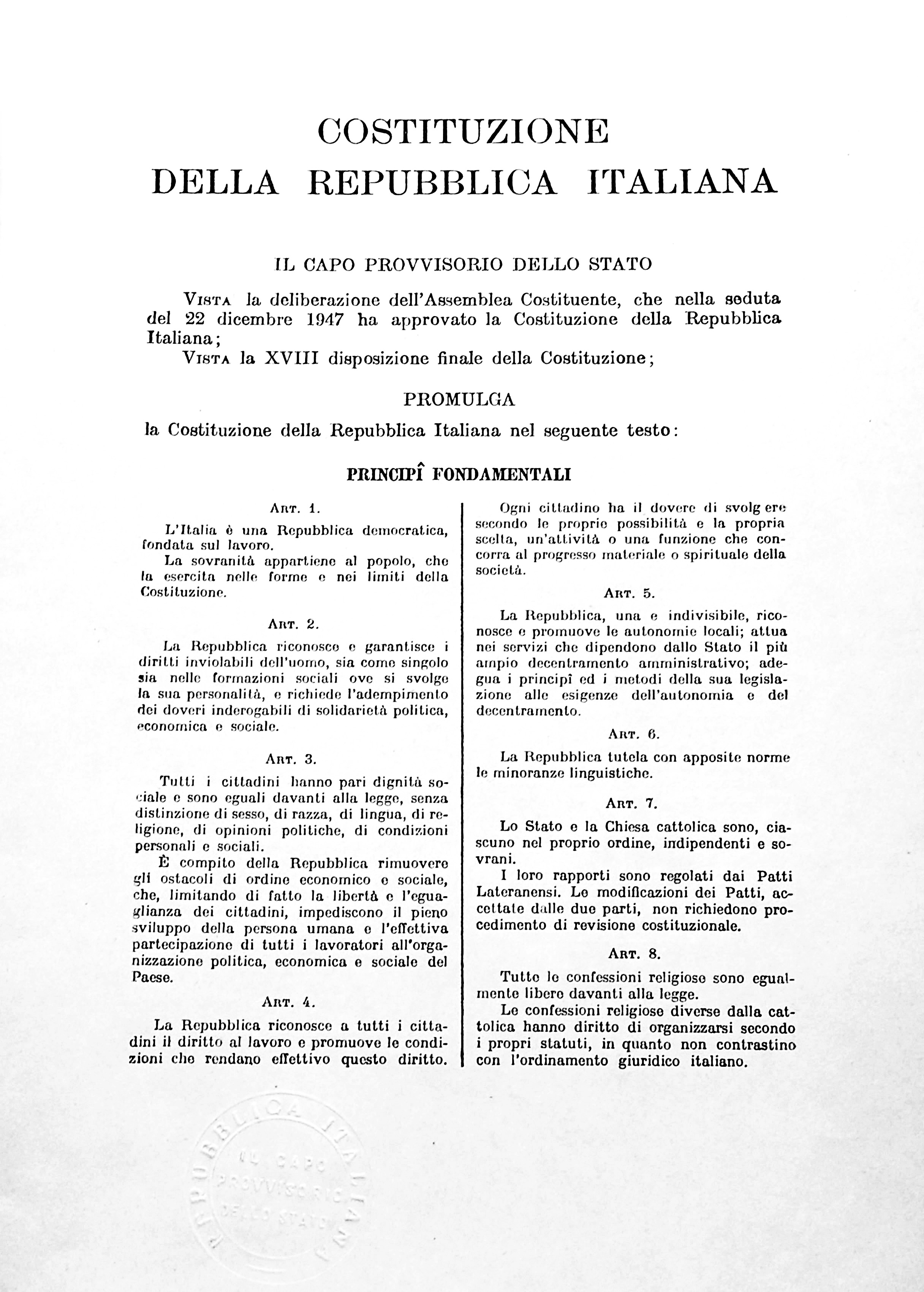
One of three original copies, now in the custody of historical archives of the president of the Republic, of the constitution of Italy

The law of Italy has a plurality of sources of production. These are arranged in a hierarchical scale, under which the rule of a lower source cannot conflict with the rule of an upper source (hierarchy of sources). The constitution of 1948 is the main source.

The constitution states that justice is administered in the name of the people and that judges are subject only to the law. So the judiciary is a branch that is completely autonomous and independent of all other branches of power, even though the minister of justice is responsible for the organization and functioning of those services involved with justice and has the power to originate disciplinary actions against judges, which are then administered by the High Council of the Judiciary, presided over by the president.

The judiciary of Italy is based on Roman law, the Napoleonic Code and later statutes. It is based on a mix of the adversarial and inquisitorial civil law systems, although the adversarial system was adopted in the appeal courts in 1988. Appeals are treated almost as new trials, and three degrees of trial are present. The third is a legitimating trial.

There is only partial judicial review of legislation in the North-American sense. Judicial review can be enacted only under certain conditions, either it already being established by constitutional law, or in the Constitutional Court, which can reject violating laws after judicial scrutiny. According to Article 134 of the constitution, the Constitutional Court shall pass judgement on:

- Controversies on the constitutionality of laws issued by the state and regions.
- Conflicts arising from the allocation of powers of the state and those powers’ allocation between regions.
- Charges brought against the president and until 1989 the ministers.

The Constitutional Court is composed of 15 judges, one of which is the president of the Italian Constitutional Court elected from the court itself. One third of the judges are appointed by the president of the Italian Republic, one-third are elected by Parliament and one-third are elected by the ordinary and administrative supreme courts. The Constitutional Court passes on the constitutionality of laws, and is a post-World War II innovation.

The Constitutional Court was primarily established "for the protection of the legal order and only indirectly as an institution for the vindication of fundamental rights" of individuals. The court generally only has the power of judicial review over "laws and enactments having force of law issued by the State and Regions" (what is called primary legislation in civil-law systems) and does not have the power to review administration acts and regulations, or parliamentary rules.

In November 2014, Italy accepted the compulsory jurisdiction of the International Court of Justice.
