= Just a Yes =

Basta un Sì
- Formation: 21 May 2016
- Purpose: Approval of the constitutional reform in the referendum
- Region served: Italy
- Coordinator: Maria Elena Boschi
- Political adviser: Jim Messina
- Website: www.bastaunsi.it

Basta un Sì ("a Yes is enough") is an advocacy group which campaigns in favour of the constitutional reform, proposed by Matteo Renzi's government and approved by the Italian Parliament in the Spring of 2016, The group played an active role in the December 2016 constitutional referendum, and is actively supported by the Democratic Party.

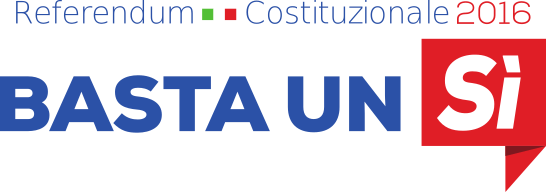
First logo of the campaign.

On 21 May 2016 Renzi announced the formation of the "National Committee 'A Yes is Enough'" (Comitato Nazionale Basta un Sì).

On the same day, Maria Elena Boschi, who is the Minister of Constitutional Reforms in Renzi's government, was appointed Coordinator of the committee. Moreover, Renzi had hired American political adviser Jim Messina, who had previously managed Barack Obama's presidential campaigns, to oversee the campaign for "Yes".

On 24 May 2016, 193 university professors published a manifesto on L'Unità (the official newspaper of the Democratic Party), in which they expressed their support to the constitutional reform. Notable signatories were Franco Bassanini and Guido Tabellini.

On 2 June, on the newspaper la Repubblica 300 notable professors, intellectuals, politicians and artists have signed a manifesto in favour of the reforms. The most famous signatories were Isabella Adinolfi, Stefano Arduini, Luigi Berlinguer, Andrea Carandini, Liliana Cavani, Fulvio Conti, Enrico Decleva, Antonio Ereditato, Mario Fortunato, Raffaele Lauro, Franco Malerba, Alberto Melloni, Federico Moccia, Andrea Moro, Giuseppe Novelli, Alberto Oliverio, Lorenzo Ornaghi, Annalisa Piras, Riccardo Pozzo, Michele Rak, Vincenzo Scotti, Luca Serianni, Giacomo Stella, Susanna Tamaro, Giuseppe Veltri and Giuliano Volpe.
