= Normattiva =

Italian law database

- Website type: Italian law
- Available in: Italian
- Owner: Italian state
- Creator: Istituto Poligrafico e Zecca dello Stato
- Website: www.normattiva.it
- Commercial: No
- Registration: No
- Launched: 19 March 2010
- Current status: active

Normattiva is an Italian government website published on 19 March 2010. It contains the rules of Italian law beginning in 1861.

== Institution ==
The Normattiva was created by two laws:

- Disposizioni per la formazione del bilancio annuale e pluriennale dello Stato (legge finanziaria 2001) [Disposals for the preparation of the annual and multi-annual State budget (Financial Law 2001)] (law 388, 107) (in Italian). 23 December 2000.
- Misure urgenti in materia di semplificazione normativa [Urgent Measures about Regulatory Simplification] (law decree 200, 200) (in Italian). 22 December 2008.

These were issued to create a free service for the review of all Italian legislation.

== History ==
The site has been updated over the years. It progressively addressed earlier legislation.

- 19 March 2010, publication of the website
- 8 May 2010, legislation available since 1970
- 22 June 2010, legislation available since 1960
- 28 September 2010, legislation available since 1946
- 5 December 2013, legislation available since 1944
- 21 February 2014, legislation available since 1942
- 3 July 2014, legislation available since 1940
- 18 July 2014, list of the main codes
- 25 September 2014, legislation available since 1938
- 1 December 2014, legislation available since 1933
- 2 May 2018, legislation available since 1916
- 2 August 2018, legislation available since 1861
