= I Vote No =

Italian advocacy group

Io Voto No
- Formation: 30 October 2015
- Purpose: Rejection of the constitutional reform in the referendum
- Region served: Italy
- President: Alessandro Pace
- Honorary President: Gustavo Zagrebelsky
- Website: www.iovotono.it

Io Voto No ("I Vote No") is an advocacy group in Italy that successfully campaigned to reject the constitutional reform, proposed by Matteo Renzi's government and approved by the Italian Parliament in the Spring of 2016, in the December 2016 constitutional referendum. The group's honorary president is Gustavo Zagrebelsky.

On 30 October 2015 the "Committee for No to the referendum on the modification of the Constitution" (Comitato per il No al referendum sulle modifiche alla Costituzione) was founded, with Alessandro Pace as president and Gustavo Zagrebelsky as honorary president. Other notable members are Antonio Di Pietro, Maurizio Landini, Stefano Rodotà and Cesare Salvi.

On 11 March 2016, on the newspaper Il Fatto Quotidiano many notable professors, intellectuals, politicians and artists have signed a manifesto in opposition of the reforms. The most famous signatories were:

- Nicola Acocella
- Andrea Bajani
- Luciano Canfora
- Luigi Ciotti
- Paul Ginsborg
- Monica Guerritore
- Leo Gullotta
- Paolo Leon
- Valerio Magrelli
- Fiorella Mannoia
- Ivano Marescotti
- Citto Maselli
- Giuliano Montaldo
- Piergiorgio Odifreddi
- Moni Ovadia
- Giorgio Parisi
- Gianfranco Pasquino
- Daniela Poggi
- Giacomo Scarpelli
- Giuseppe Sergi
- Toni Servillo
- Marco Travaglio
- Gianni Vattimo
- Daniele Vicari
- Alex Zanotelli
