= Istituto Poligrafico e Zecca dello Stato =

Italian mint

Istituto Poligrafico e Zecca dello Stato S.p.A.
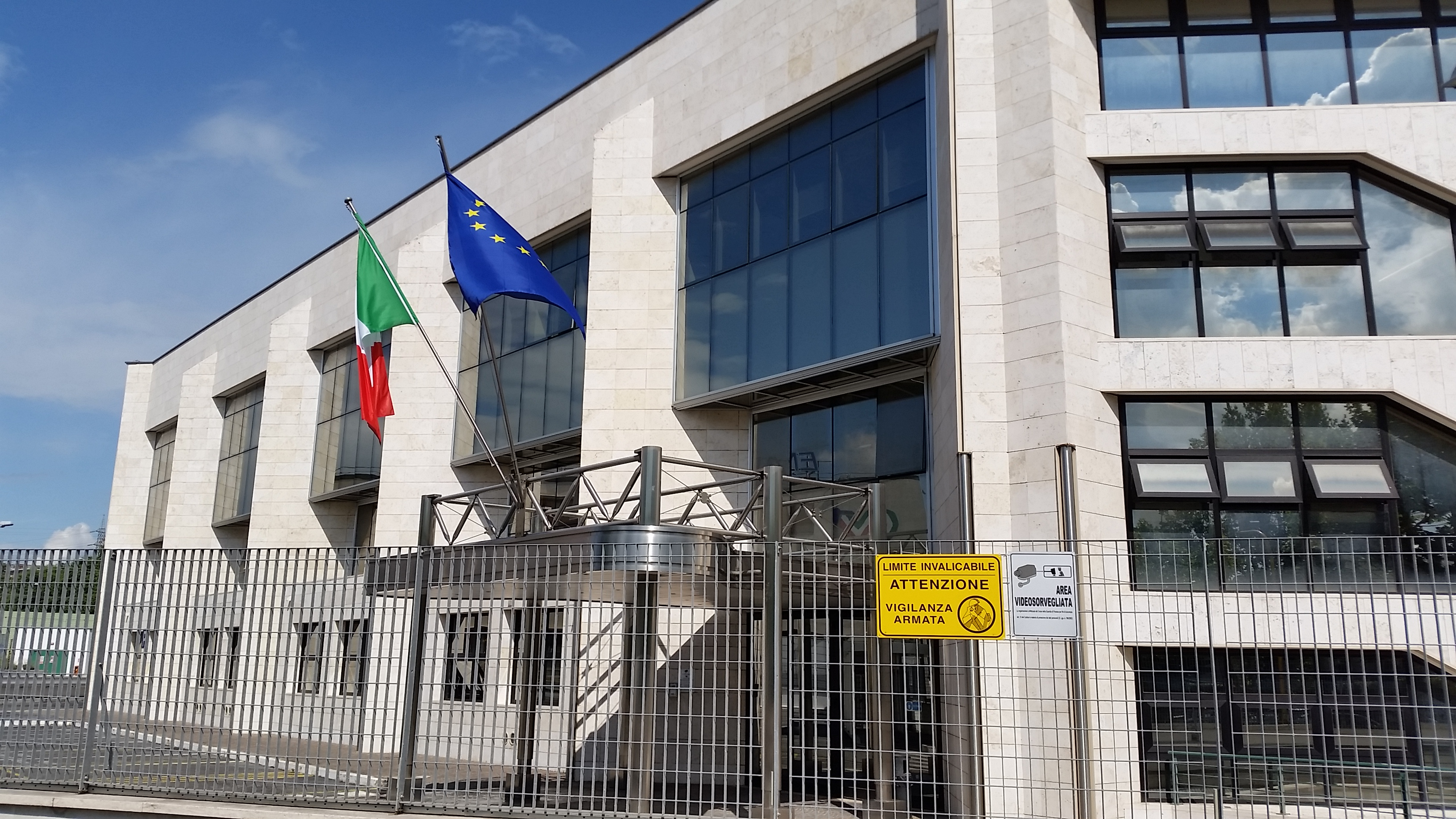
- IPZS headquarters in Rome
- Type: Società per azioni
- Industry: Numismatics; security; anti-counterfeit; publishing
- Founded: 6 December 1928; 97 years ago
- Headquarters: Rome, Italy
- Area served: Italy, San Marino, Vatican City
- Key people: Paolo Perrone, President; Michele Sciscioli, CEO
- Products: Coins; medals; Gazzetta Ufficiale; postage stamps, ID cards; driving licenses; passports; residence permits
- Revenue: €372,574 million (2017)
- Net income: €49.765 million (2017)
- Owner: Italian Ministry of Economy and Finance
- Number of employees: 1,736 (2017)
- Website: ipzs.it

The Istituto Poligrafico e Zecca dello Stato (IPZS; 'State Mint and Polygraphic Institute') is an Italian mint and publisher founded in 1928, and situated at the via Salaria 691 in Rome. As well as producing coins, passports, and postage stamps for Italy, it serves the micro-states of Vatican City, San Marino, and the Sovereign Military Order of Malta. It also publishes books under the imprint Libreria dello Stato. The O.C.V. (Officina Carte Valori) and traditional productions factory, the multimedial production institute and the Mint are also located in the capital. Other factories are located in Verrès, Val d'Aosta, and Foggia, Apulia. Banknotes are produced by the Bank of Italy.

In 2002, IPZS became a public limited company (società per azioni or SpA) with the Italian Ministry of Economy and Finance (Ministero dell'Economia e delle Finanze) as sole shareholder.

== History ==
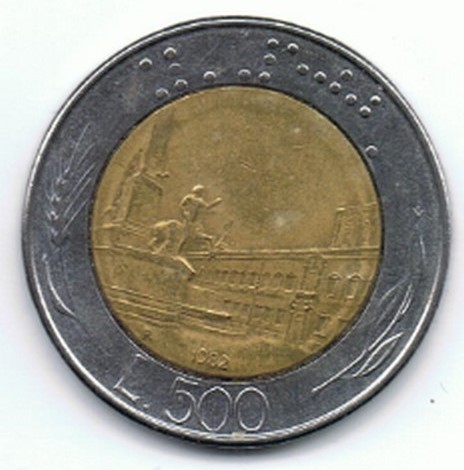
Bi-metallic 500 lire coin minted in 1982.

On 27 December 1911, the Italian mint was officially inaugurated by king Victor Emmanuel III in the seat located in via Principe Umberto, on the Esquiline. But in 1907, Victor Emmanuel founded the Scuola dell'Arte della Medaglia (SAM) ('School of the Art of Medalmaking') in the old location of the mint. The school trained new artists about carving and modelling techniques and its attendants would later manufacture real coins: it is still nowadays a unique example in the world of didactic and creative formation inside a mint.

In 1928, the Istituto Poligrafico dello Stato ('State Polygraphic Institute') was established and in 1978 acquired the mint section, under president Rosario Lanza, becoming the Istituto Poligrafico e Zecca dello Stato. In 1982, it became the first mint to manufacture bi-metallic coins through a patented process. In 2025, it was announced that the IPZS would produce the Olympic medals for the 2026 Winter Olympics and 2026 Winter Paralympics.

== Functions ==
IPZS prints official state publications like the Gazzetta Ufficiale, state marks and seals, postal stamps and manufactures coins. IPZS designs anti-counterfeiting and security systems for identity cards, electronic passports, driving licenses and residence permits. It manufactures vehicle registration plates and manages institutional sites and databases.

Since 2001, the CNAC (Coin National Analysis Centre) has been established in the Mint and it analyses counterfeit coins delivered by obliged subjects in Italy, San Marino and Vatican City. According to the Italian law n° 27 of 24 March 2012, CNAC has additional tasks and functions which derive from the application of the EU Regulation 1210/2010. CNAC receives coins not suitable for circulation, carries out tests using specific instruments (art. 5 of the aforesaid regulation), does the annual controls according to the article 6 of the aforesaid regulation (commas 2 and 6) and trains the personnel involved in the authentication process. It is a member of the European group of sophistication of the OLAF, headed by OLAF/ETSC (European Technical and scientific Centre) and formed by 27 European CNACs, Europol and the European Central Bank.

== Identity documents ==
IPZS designs, manufactures, operates, and develops the software infrastructure required for issuing identity documents, such as the electronic identity card, the electronic passport, and the electronic residence permit. The integrated management of production, issuance, and verification processes for products that attest citizens' identity and the authenticity of identification documents, of which the State is the guarantor, constitutes a safeguard for security and public trust.

=== CIE 3.0 ===
The new Electronic Identity Card (CIE) guarantees a citizen's physical and digital identity and enables access to online services of public administrations and private providers, including within the EU. In 2019, IPZS developed the CIE ID application, which allows users to authenticate via "Entra con CIE" and connect to key public services using their smartphone. In 2018, the rollout of the workstations used to issue the document was completed in all Italian municipalities, and since 2019 the issuance of the CIE abroad has also begun on an experimental basis.

== Anti-counterfeiting and traceability ==
Products that are made for protecting public health, such as pharmaceutical security seals, tobacco tax stamps, and designation-of-origin (D.O.) wine seals for the grape-wine supply chain, are produced by IPZS using printing techniques and are equipped with systems to identify authenticity of the origin of a product and its traceability throughout its entire life cycle.

As a joint initiative between IPZS and the Banco d'Italia, in 2018 the subsidiary Valoridicarta S.p.A. was established to produce, under an in-house providing model, special security papers and security and/or anti-counterfeiting elements/products, with particular reference to banknote paper and identity documents.

In 2024, IPZS promoted the "Made In Italy Innovation Challenge" in collaboration with Codemotion, a hackathon aimed at developing technological solutions to protect "Made in Italy" products. The winning project, Checkmate, combined blockchain, artificial intelligence, and physical security features to improve traceability and ensure product authenticity.

== Legal–administrative services and web-based products ==
In keeping with the open-government objectives set by the national legislative and policy framework, IPZS carries out the following activities to disseminate public-source information of a legal, administrative, cultural, and scientific nature:

- development and management of the computerized process for the production and distribution of the Gazzetta Ufficiale (in print and online);
- development and operation of the "Normattiva" service, which provides free online access to all Italian legislation with multi-version (consolidated) texts from 1861 to the present, with the database updated daily to reflect amendments to legislative acts;
- management of web services dedicated to the dissemination of public-source information;
- development and management of services for the acquisition, collection, editing, and metadata tagging of information relating to legal-legislative topics;
- editing and production of editorial works under the "Libreria dello Stato" imprint;
- production of publications, paper-based products, and various forms for the public administration, including the materials needed to manage electoral services.

== Social and environmental sustainability commitments ==
In line with the international, European, and national context in which it operates and in light of the challenges posed by climate change and the rise of new circular economy models, IPZS pursues the following improvement directions:

- Life-cycle analysis of the current product portfolio and the design of new products from a circular economy perspective;
- Responsible purchasing processes (supplier sustainability assessments as a rewarding criterion in procurement, and shortening the supply chain);
- Increasing energy independence through self-generation and the use of renewable sources;
- Adoption of active policies aimed at carbon neutrality;
- Company-wide rollout of worker-safety systems based on virtuous behaviors (BBS – Best Behaviour Safety);
- Reducing the environmental footprint of products and production processes.

== Economic indicators ==
The company's revenue amounted to €360 million in 2013, while in fiscal year 2018 it reached €460 million, with an average annual growth rate of 4%. Operating EBITDA in 2018 reached €178 million (around 38% of revenue); in 2013 this indicator was just over €110 million. i.

== Managers ==
Period	Role and name	Notes
2025 - (Term of office 2025-)	President: Paolo Perrone; CEO: Michele Sciscioli	
2023–2025 (Term of office 2023 – 2025)	President: Paolo Perrone; CEO: Francesco Soro	
2020–2023 (Term of office 2020 – 2023)	President: Antonio Palma, Paolo Cento; CEO: Paolo Aielli, Francesco Reich	
2017–2020 (Term of office 2017 – 2019)	President: Domenico Tudini; CEO: Paolo Aielli	
2014–2016	President: Domenico Tudini; CEO: Paolo Aielli	
2011–2013	President and CEO: Maurizio Prato	
2008–2010	President: Roberto Mazzei; CEO: Ferruccio Ferranti	
2007–2009	President: Mario Murri; CEO: Lamberto Gabrielli	
2004–2006	President (2004–2005): Silvano Boroli; President (2006): Antonio La Pergola; Vice: Giovanni Fiori; CEO: Massimo Ponzellini	
2002–2004	President: Claudio Varrone	

== See also ==
- Banca d'Italia
- Italian Lira
- Italian passport
- Postage stamps and postal history of Italy
