= 2016 Italian constitutional referendum =

- 4 December 2016
- Do you approve the text of the Constitutional Law concerning 'Provisions for overcoming equal bicameralism, reducing the number of Members of Parliament, limiting the operating costs of the institutions, the suppression of the CNEL and the revision of Title V of Part II of the Constitution' approved by Parliament and published in the Official Gazette no. 88 of 15 April 2016?

Results
Choice	Votes	%
Yes	13,431,087	40.88%
No	19,421,025	59.12%
Valid votes	32,852,112	98.82%
Invalid or blank votes	392,146	1.18%
Total votes	33,244,258	100.00%
Registered voters/turnout	50,773,284	65.48%
Result by province
Majority Yes vote	Majority No vote

A constitutional referendum was held in Italy on 4 December 2016. Voters were asked whether they approved a constitutional law that amends the Italian Constitution to reform the composition and powers of the Parliament of Italy, as well as the division of powers between the State, the regions, and administrative entities.

The bill, put forward by the then Prime Minister of Italy, Matteo Renzi, and his centre-left Democratic Party, was first introduced by the government in the Senate on 8 April 2014. After several amendments were made to the proposed law by both the Senate and the Chamber of Deputies, the bill received its first approval on 13 October 2015 (Senate) and 11 January 2016 (Chamber), and, eventually, its second and final approval on 20 January 2016 (Senate) and 12 April 2016 (Chamber).

In accordance with Article 138 of the Constitution, a referendum was called after the formal request of more than one fifth of the members of both the Senate and the Chamber of Deputies, since the constitutional law had not been approved by a qualified majority of two-thirds in each house of parliament in the second vote. 59.11% of voters voted against the constitutional reform, meaning it did not come into effect. This was the third constitutional referendum in the history of the Italian Republic; the other two were in 2001 (in which the amending law was approved) and in 2006 (in which it was rejected).

Had the voters approved the constitutional law, it would have achieved the most extensive constitutional reform in Italy since the end of the monarchy, not only influencing the organization of the Parliament, but also improving, according to its proponents, on the poor government stability of the country. Opposition parties and well-known jurists (such as Gustavo Zagrebelsky and Stefano Rodotà) harshly criticised the bill, claiming that it was poorly written and would have made the government too powerful.

Following the clear victory of the "No" vote, Renzi tendered his resignation as prime minister. Paolo Gentiloni was selected as his replacement on 11 December.

== Constitutional background ==
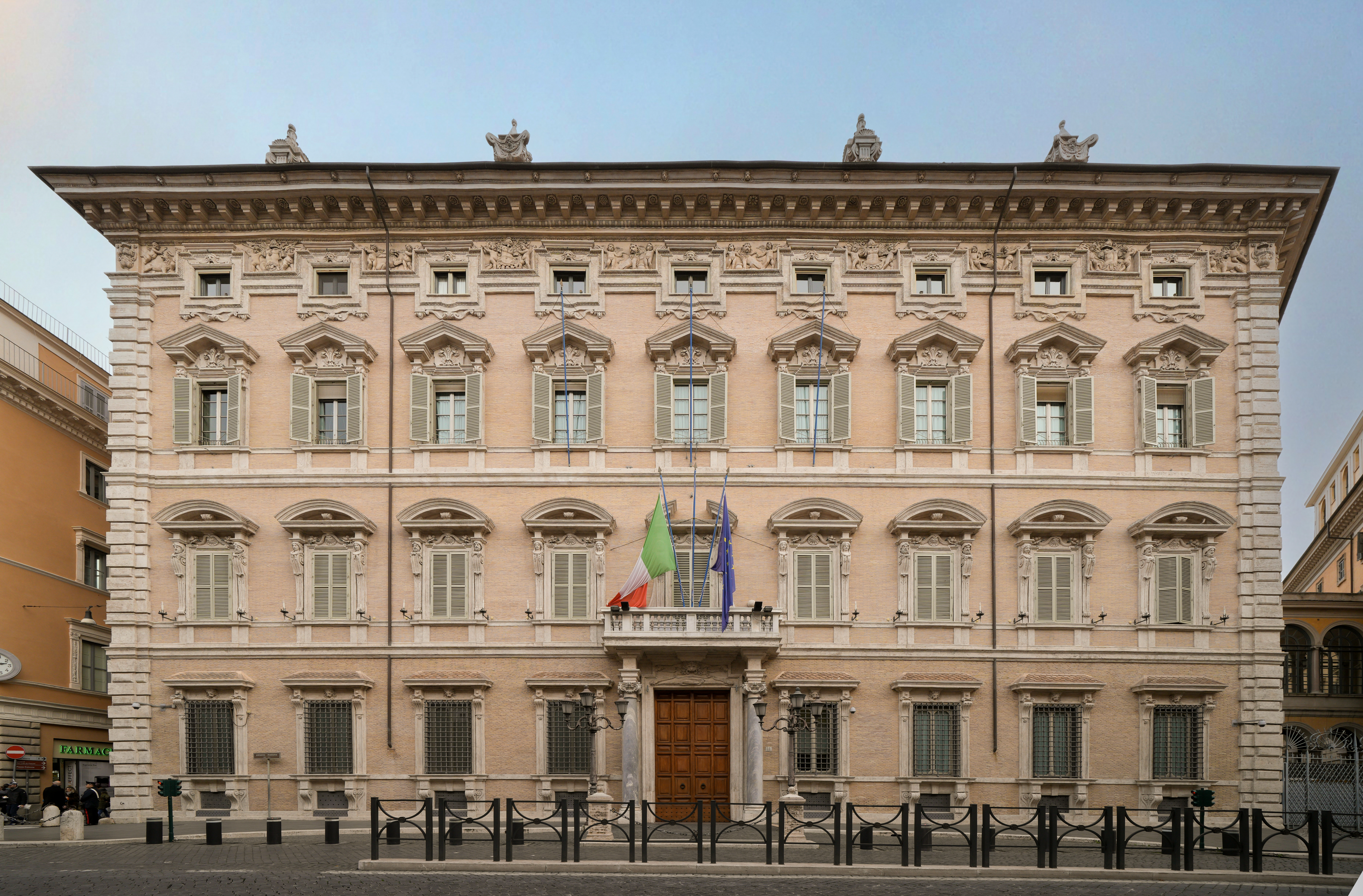
Palazzo Madama, the meeting place of the Italian Senate.

The Italian Parliament is described as a perfectly symmetric bicameral legislature, in that it has a lower house (the Chamber of Deputies) and an upper house (the Senate of the Republic) with the following characteristics:

- The two houses are elected simultaneously and for the same five-year term.
- The Government must have each house's confidence, and is responsible to both of them.
- All legislation must be passed in the same text by both houses: whenever a bill is amended by either house, it must be sent to the other one in a process known as the navetta parlamentare (parliamentary shuttle).

== Political background ==
The first concrete attempts at reforming the Senate took place in the 1980s, when the first bicameral committee for constitutional reform headed by Aldo Bozzi was created (1983). A second bicameral committee (headed by Ciriaco De Mita, later replaced by Nilde Iotti) operated in 1992–1994, followed in 1997 by the third committee headed by the leader of the Left Democrats, Massimo D'Alema. These attempts were unsuccessful.

A reform bill proposed by Silvio Berlusconi's government was finally approved by the parliament in 2005. This proposal, which would also have considerably strengthened the powers of the prime minister, at the same time weakening the role of the President, was ultimately rejected in the 2006 referendum.

In 2011, with the financial crisis ensuing and Berlusconi forced to resign from the position of prime minister, the Parliament reprised discussions on constitutional reforms at the urging of president Giorgio Napolitano. However, strong disagreements between the two main parties (the People of Freedom and the Democratic Party) prevented the Parliament from deciding on a reform.

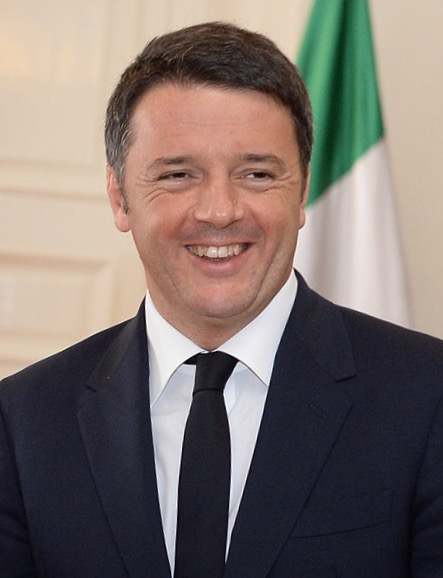
Matteo Renzi in 2015.

After the 2013 general election, constitutional reform remained a prominent political topic. However, the first real breakthrough occurred when Matteo Renzi, the new Secretary of the Democratic Party, was appointed prime minister in February 2014. As part of his government's program, Renzi pledged to implement a number of reforms, including the abolition of the perfectly symmetric bicameralism, with a substantial decrease in the membership and power of the Senate. As well as effectively abolishing the current Senate, the package also included a new electoral law, aimed at giving the party that won the most votes in elections for the Chamber of Deputies a great many additional seats, allowing the formation of a stronger government.

After the proposals passed both the Chamber of Deputies and the Senate twice, as required by Article 138 of the Italian constitution, Renzi scheduled a referendum to secure the Italian people's endorsement for October and also indicated that he would resign if his reforms were rejected. Some opposition parties, predominantly Five Star Movement, Lega Nord and Italian Left, and also some newspapers like Il Fatto Quotidiano and Il manifesto, accused Renzi of turning the referendum into a plebiscite on his premiership with those comments. However, after some months, Renzi said that his government will continue until the end of the legislature.

On 15 January 2016, La Repubblica reported that Renzi had hired American political adviser Jim Messina – who had worked with Barack Obama and David Cameron and would later work for Mariano Rajoy – to oversee the campaign for "Yes".

== Details of the proposed change ==
=== Role and powers of the Senate ===
The Senate represents territorial institutions. It shares the legislative power with the Chamber of Deputies, but the vote of the Senate is only required to enact laws regarding specific matters. For all other laws, the vote of the Senate is optional and can be overruled by a second vote of the Chamber of Deputies.

Senators enjoy the same immunities as the deputies, but receive no remuneration.

The Government does not need to have the confidence of the new Senate, and the Senate cannot pass a motion of no confidence against the Government.

=== Composition of the Senate ===
- 95 senators are elected by the Regional Councils and by the Councils of the autonomous provinces of Trento and Bozen. In each region and autonomous province, one senator (21 in total) must be elected from among the mayors of the respective territories; the remaining 74 senators must be elected from among the members of the Councils themselves.
- 5 senators are appointed by the President of the Republic for a seven-year term.
- Former presidents of the Republic are senators for life.

The Senate is not subject to dissolution; instead, when a Regional Council ends its five years term, so do the senators elected by it; new senators will be elected after the Regional Council is renewed.

==== Apportionment of seats among regions ====
Region	Seats	Region	Seats	Region	Seats
Abruzzo	2	Friuli-Venezia Giulia	2	Sardinia	3
Aosta Valley	2	Lazio	8	Sicily	7
Apulia	6	Liguria	2	South Tyrol^{[a]}	2
Basilicata	2	Lombardy	14	Trentino^{[a]}	2
Calabria	3	Marche	2	Tuscany	5
Campania	9	Molise	2	Umbria	2
Emilia-Romagna	6	Piedmont	7	Veneto	7

^{a} Autonomous province, part of the region of Trentino-Alto Adige/Südtirol.

=== Legislative procedure ===
The reform differentiates between two main legislative procedures: a unicameral procedure (in which the role of the Senate is mostly consultative) and a bicameral procedure (in which a bill must be approved by both Chambers).

Under the unicameral procedure (which is used every time the Constitution does not require a special procedure), bills can be adopted by a vote of the Chamber of Deputies. At that point, the approved bill is sent to the Senate, which has 10 days to decide whether to examine it to propose changes, or let it be enacted without modification. If one-third of the senators ask to review the bill, the Senate has 30 days to formulate amendments and send the bill back to the Chamber of Deputies. Then the deputies will take the final decision on the Senate's proposals and on the bill as a whole. No further approval of the Senate is needed, but a qualified majority might be required to overcome the Senate's veto for laws adopted under the supremacy clause.

The bicameral procedure works in a similar way to the current legislative procedure, in that bills must be approved in the same text by both houses to be enacted, and will be forwarded from one house to the other until approved by both. This procedure is required for bills regarding the following.

- territorial subdivisions of Italy (regions, municipalities, metropolitan cities, and the special municipality of Rome)
- participation of Italy in the European Union (e.g. ratification of EU treaties)
- the Senate itself (e.g. its electoral law)
- protection of linguistic minorities
- referendums and other forms of popular consultation

Opponents to the referendum argue that the legislative procedures under the reformed Constitution would be much more than two, because of the several articles that introduce exceptions.

=== State and regional competence ===
The reform draws a different partition of matters reserved to the State and to the regions. The so-called "concurrent competence", according to which State law legislates the principles that are later to be implemented by regional laws, is abolished. All concurrent matters are reassigned to either the State's or the regions' competence.

The Government can propose legislation to the Parliament on matters that are not reserved to the State, when this is required to protect the juridical or economic unity of Italy, or to protect national interests. Such laws are adopted according to the unicameral legislative procedure: however, when modifications are proposed by an absolute majority of the members of the Senate, the Chamber of Deputies can override the proposals only by voting against them with an absolute majority of its members.

=== CNEL and provinces ===
The National Council for Economics and Labour (CNEL), which is a consultative assembly of experts of the economic, social, and legal fields, representatives of public and private-sector producers of goods and services, and representatives of social service and voluntary organisations, is abolished.

Provinces (the second-level administrative divisions of Italy) are removed from the Constitution, except for the autonomous provinces of Bolzano and Trento. This opens the door for ordinary laws to abolish or radically reform them. In 2014–15 fourteen provinces were already replaced by "metropolitan cities" (that still exist in the reformed Constitution).

=== Other changes ===
- The majority required to elect the president is increased to three-fifths of the members of the Parliament in joint session after the third round of balloting, and changed to three-fifths of votes after the sixth round. (The pre-reform Constitution mandates an absolute majority of the members of Parliament after the third round of balloting.)
- Two judges of the Constitutional Court are elected by the Senate, three by the Chamber of Deputies. (In the pre-reform Constitution, the Parliament in joint session elects five judges.)
- The initiative of 150,000 voters is required to propose new legislation. Once the text is received, the Parliament will be obliged to discuss it. (The pre-reform Constitution requires only 50,000 signatures to propose a bill but it doesn't require the Parliament to discuss it.)
- When a referendum is requested by more than 800,000 voters, up from 500,000 in the pre-reform constitution, it only requires a reduced turnout to be valid (more than half of the turnout registered in the last general election, down from the absolute majority of the electorate in the pre-reform Constitution).
- Electoral laws are subject to a preemptive constitutional review by the Constitutional Court, as an additional guarantee for parliamentary minorities.
- A state of war can be declared by the Chamber of Deputies only (instead of requiring the approval of both houses as in the pre-reform Constitution); however, it must be approved by an absolute majority of its members (currently, a simple majority vote is sufficient).

== Reactions and criticism ==
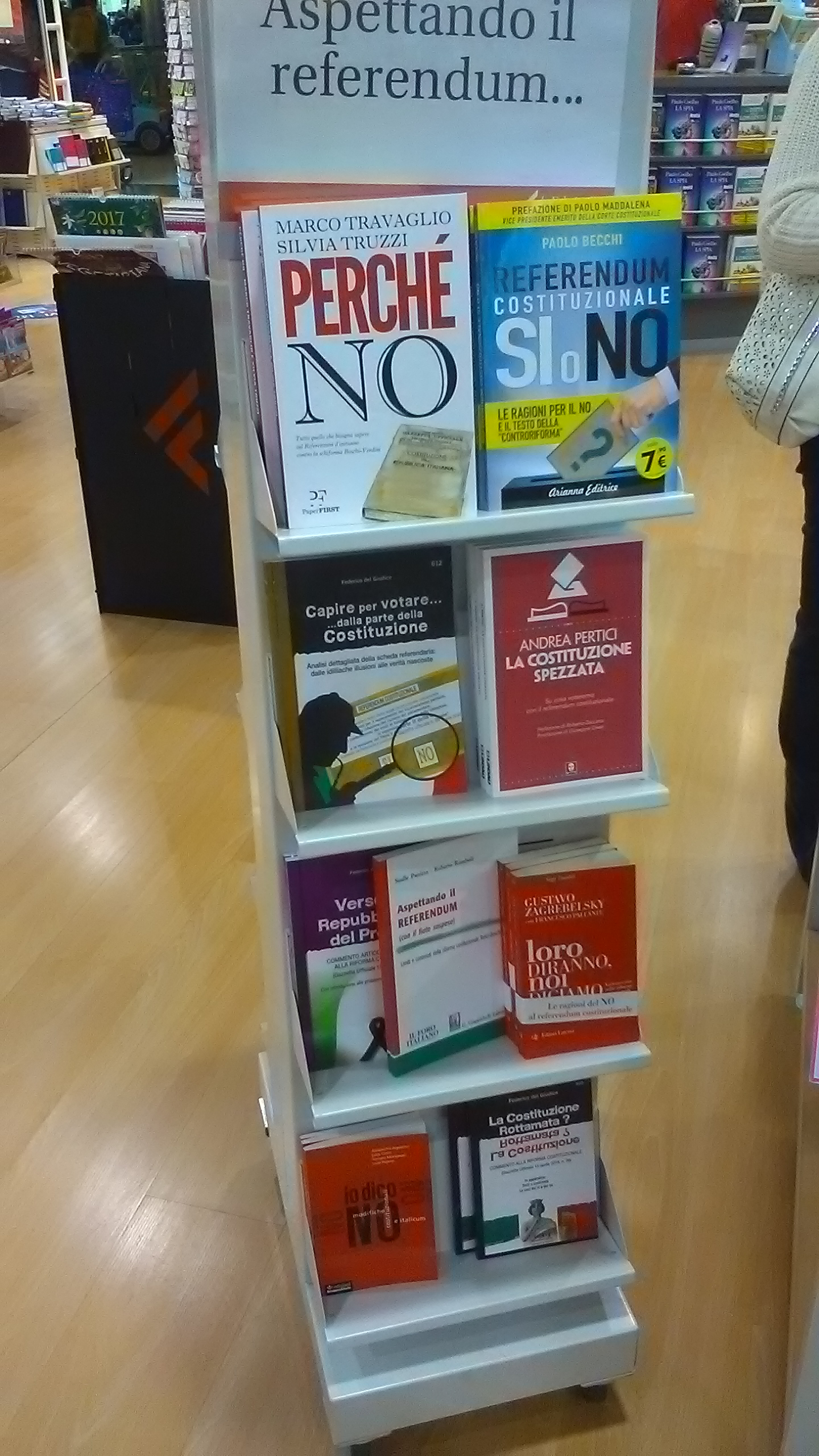
Books about the 2016 constitutional referendum.

Prime Minister Renzi was accused by some law scholars and politicians, such as Stefano Rodotà and Fausto Bertinotti, of being authoritarian and anti-democratic for proposing this reform. Others, like Gianfranco Pasquino, argue that the adopted text is badly written.

In April 2016, a paper called "Appello dei costituzionalisti" ("A Plea from Constitutional Scholars") was written by 56 law scholars (mainly constitutional law scholars), showing criticism of the proposed reform and their numerous concerns: among them are Francesco Amirante, Paolo Caretti, Lorenza Carlassare, Ugo De Siervo, Giovanni Maria Flick, Paolo Maddalena, Valerio Onida, Alfonso Quaranta and Gustavo Zagrebelsky. The main points of criticism the paper raises are the following:

- The reform was approved by Prime Minister Renzi's coalition, without reaching a consensus among a plurality of the political parties in the Parliament. (The Constitution of Italy was adopted and has been traditionally amended by consensus.)
- The reformed Senate does not adequately represent the interests of the regions because of its weakened powers and the method of appointment of the senators (which favors the representation of political parties, rather than representatives of local interests). The number of senators has been changed without accounting for their role in electing independent organs, such as the President of Italy and part of the Constitutional Court.
- The many legislative procedures (the paper identifies three) bring risks of uncertainties and conflicts.
- Ordinary regions are rendered almost powerless under the new Constitution (while the five regions with special autonomy are left unchanged). The lack of coherent legislation to regulate the partition of competence between the State and regions and the lack of effective cooperation between the various constituent entities are not addressed. The reform abolishes concurrent competence between State and regions on one hand, but on the other it limits many areas of exclusive competence for the State to "general and common dispositions" only (which was defined as "concurrent competence" in the pre-reform Constitution).
- The reform aims at lowering the costs of public institutions, but it does so while weakening democratic representation: the number of senators is reduced to less than one-sixth of that of members of the Chamber of Deputies; provinces are abolished even in the most densely populated areas; metropolitan cities are bolstered instead of rationalizing the constituent entities (Italian comuni differ dramatically in size and population); CNEL is abolished without introducing a substitute for the debate between political institutions and representatives of the Italian society.

Later in May 2016, other 184 law scholars and professors of various disciplines (among whom Franco Bassanini, Massimo Bordignon, Stefano Ceccanti, Francesco Clementi, Carlo Fusaro, Claudia Mancina, Stefano Mannoni, Angelo Panebianco, Pasquale Pasquino, Francesco Pizzetti, Michele Salvati, Tiziano Treu) signed, instead, an appeal in favour of the constitutional reform.

== Campaign positions ==
=== Committees ===
Choice	Logo	Campaign	Slogan	Website
Yes		Just a Yes	Basta un Sì	www.bastaunsi.it
No		Committee for No	Comitato per il No	www.comitatoperilno.it
No		I Vote No	Io Voto No	www.iovotono.it

=== Main political parties ===
Choice	Parties	Political orientation	Leader	Ref
Yes	Democratic Party (PD)	Social democracy	Matteo Renzi	
Yes	New Centre-Right (NCD)	Conservatism	Angelino Alfano	
Yes	Liberal Popular Alliance (ALA)	Centrism	Denis Verdini	
Yes	Civic Choice (SC)	Liberalism	Enrico Zanetti	
No	Five Star Movement (M5S)	Populism	Beppe Grillo	
No	Forza Italia (FI)	Liberal conservatism	Silvio Berlusconi	
No	Italian Left (SI)	Democratic socialism	Nicola Fratoianni	
No	Lega Nord (LN)	Right-wing populism	Matteo Salvini	
No	Brothers of Italy (FdI)	National conservatism	Giorgia Meloni	
No	Conservatives and Reformists (CR)	Conservatism	Raffaele Fitto	

=== European political parties ===
Choice	Parties	Political orientation	Leader	Ref
Yes	Party of European Socialists (PES)	Social democracy	Sergei Stanishev	
No	Democracy in Europe Movement 2025 (DiEM 25)	Alter-Europeanism	Yanis Varoufakis	

=== Trade unions and business organisations ===
Choice	Organisations	Political and cultural orientation	Secretaries
Yes	General Confederation of Italian Industry (Confindustria)	Employers and businesses' organisation	Vincenzo Boccia
Yes	Italian Confederation of Workers' Trade Unions (CISL)	Centrism	Anna Maria Furlan
No	Italian General Confederation of Labour (CGIL)	Democratic socialism	Susanna Camusso
No	General Labour Union (UGL)	National syndicalism	Francesco Paolo Capone
Neutral/Undeclared	Italian Labour Union (UIL)	Social democracy	Carmelo Barbagallo

=== Newspapers ===
Choice	Newspapers	Political and cultural orientation
Yes	L'Unità	Social democracy
Yes	Il Sole 24 Ore	Business newspaper
Yes	Il Foglio	Liberal conservatism
No	Il Fatto Quotidiano	Anti-establishment, populism
No	Il Giornale	Conservatism
No	Libero	Liberal conservatism
No	Il manifesto	Communism
Neutral/Undeclared	La Repubblica	Social liberalism
Neutral/Undeclared	Corriere della Sera	Centrism
Neutral/Undeclared	La Stampa	Centrism

=== Periodicals ===
Choice	Periodicals	Political and cultural orientation
Yes	La Civiltà Cattolica	Periodical published by the Society of Jesus
Yes	Mondoperaio	Monthly journal, official organ of the Italian Socialist Party

=== Other organisations ===
Choice	Organisations	Political and cultural orientation	Leaders
Yes	Christian Associations of Italian Workers (ACLI)	Catholic social teaching, Christian left	Roberto Rossini
No	National Association of the Italian Partisans (ANPI)	Anti-fascism	Carlo Smuraglia
Neutral	Libera	Anti-mafia	Luigi Ciotti

== TV debates ==
Date	Channel	Programme	Moderator	Participants		Audience		Notes
Date	Channel	Programme	Moderator	YES	NO	Audience	Share	Notes
16 September	La7	Sì o No	Enrico Mentana	Roberto Giachetti	Massimo D'Alema	792,000	3.4%	
23 September	La7	Sì o No	Enrico Mentana	Gian Luca Galletti, Dario Nardella	Renato Brunetta, Giuseppe Civati	574,000	2.7%	
30 September	La7	Sì o No	Enrico Mentana	Matteo Renzi	Gustavo Zagrebelsky	1,747,000	8.0%	
14 October	La7	Sì o No	Enrico Mentana	Luciano Violante	Tomaso Montanari	626,000	3.8%	
23 September	La7	Otto e Mezzo	Lilli Gruber	Matteo Renzi	Marco Travaglio	2,280,000	9.4%	
7 October	La7	Otto e Mezzo	Lilli Gruber	Maria Elena Boschi	Matteo Salvini	2,000,000	8.4%	
28 October	La7	Sì o No	Enrico Mentana	Matteo Renzi	Ciriaco De Mita	825,000	10.8%	
4 November	La7	Sì o No	Enrico Mentana	Stefano Ceccanti; Anna Ascani	Elisabetta Piccolotti; Anna Falcone	603,000	3.5%	

== Results ==
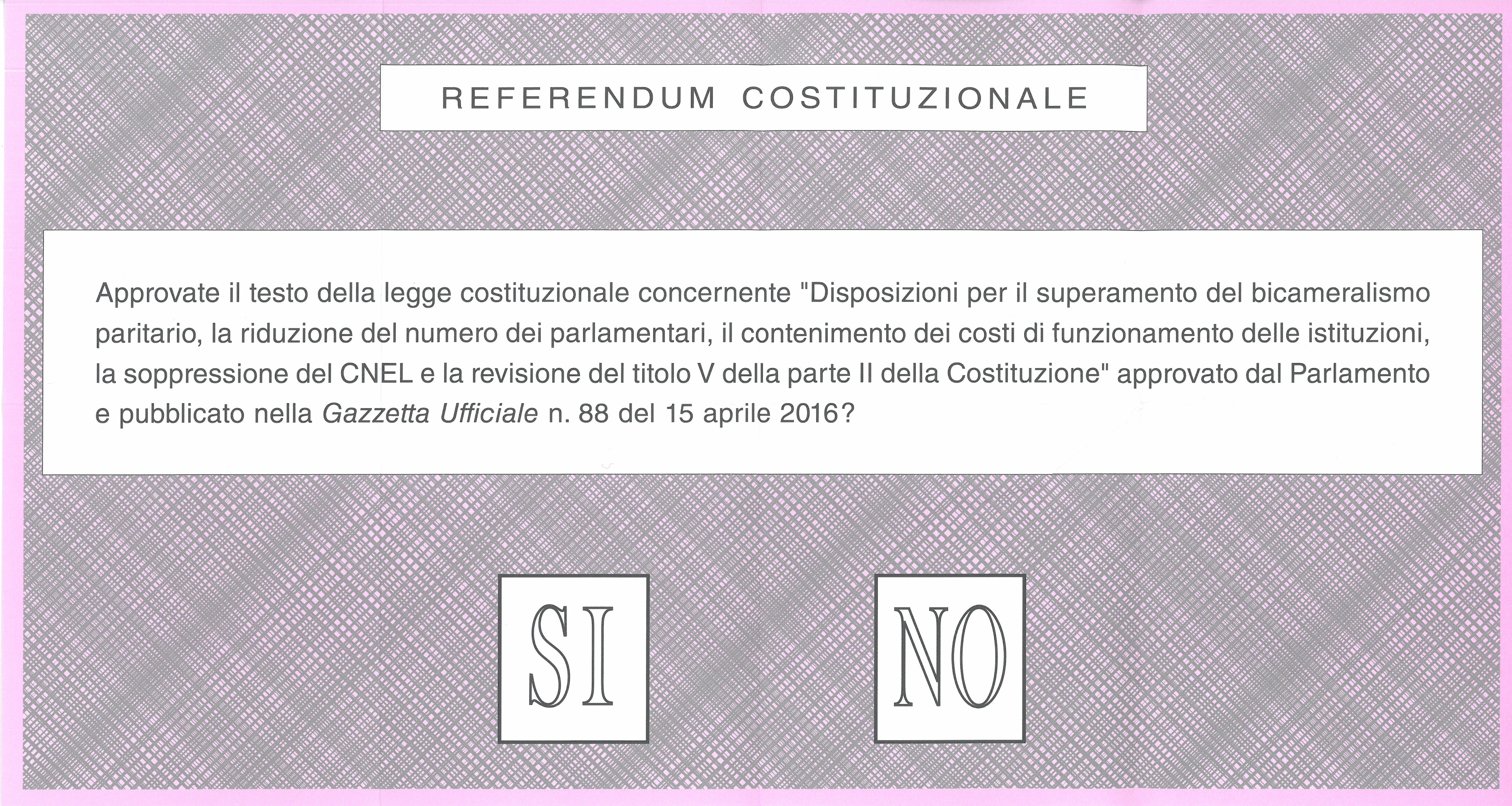
Ballot used in the referendum

"Almost 19,500,000 voters rejected the reform (59.11%), while nearly 13,500,000 voters approved it (40.88%). The turnout (65.47%) was by far the highest compared to Italy's other constitutional referendums: in 2001, the voter turnout was extremely low (34.10%); in 2006 it was higher, but barely exceeded half of the total number of eligible voters (52.46%)".

Choice	Votes	%
Yes	13,432,208	40.89
No	19,419,507	59.11
Invalid/blank votes	392,130	–
Total	33,243,845	100
Registered voters/turnout	50,773,284	65.47
Ministry of the Interior

Popular vote
No	59.11%
Yes	40.89%

=== By region ===
Sardinia and South Tyrol, both constituent entities of the Italian Republic with special conditions of autonomy, reported overall the highest percentage of No and Yes votes respectively.

Region	Yes		No		Electorate	Turnout
Region	Votes	%	Votes	%	Electorate	Turnout
Abruzzo	255,022	35.6	461,167	64.4	1,052,049	68.7
Aosta Valley	30,568	43.2	40,116	56.8	99,735	71.9
Apulia	659,354	32.8	1,348,573	67.2	3,280,745	61.7
Basilicata	98,924	34.1	191,081	65.9	467,000	62.9
Calabria	276,384	33.0	561,557	67.0	1,553,741	54.4
Campania	839,692	31.5	1,827,768	68.5	4,566,905	58.9
Emilia-Romagna	1,262,484	50.4	1,242,992	49.6	3,326,910	75.9
Friuli-Venezia Giulia	267,379	39.0	417,732	61.0	952,493	72.5
Lazio	1,108,768	36.7	1,914,397	63.3	4,402,145	69.2
Liguria	342,671	39.9	515,777	60.1	1,241,618	69.7
Lombardy	2,453,095	44.5	3,058,051	55.5	7,480,375	74.2
Marche	385,877	45.0	472,656	55.0	1,189,180	72.8
Molise	63,695	39.2	98,728	60.8	256,600	63.9
Piedmont	1,055,043	43.5	1,368,507	56.5	3,396,378	72.0
Sardinia	237,280	27.8	616,791	72.2	1,375,845	62.5
Sicily	642,980	28.4	1,619,828	71.6	4,031,871	56.7
Trentino-Alto Adige/Südtirol	305,473	53.9	261,473	46.1	792,503	72.2
Tuscany	1,105,769	52.5	1,000,008	47.5	2,854,162	74.4
Umbria	240,346	48.8	251,908	51.2	675,610	73.5
Veneto	1,078,883	38.1	1,756,144	61.9	3,725,399	76.7
Italy	12,709,515	40.0	19,025,275	60.0	46,720,943	68.5

=== Italians abroad ===
Constituency	Yes		No		Invalid/blank		Electorate	Turnout
Constituency	Votes	%	Votes	%	Votes	%	Electorate	Turnout
Europe	415,068	62.4	249,876	37.6	65,031	8.9	2,166,037	33.7
South America	207,144	71.9	80,831	28.1	40,275	12.2	1,291,065	25.4
North and Central Americas	62,816	62.2	38,113	37.8	15,979	13.6	374,987	31.2
Africa, Asia, Oceania, Antarctica	37,644	59.7	25,433	40.3	7,201	10.2	220,252	31.9
World	722,672	64.7	394,253	35.3	122,486	10.3	4,052,341	30.7

Votes of Italians abroad by country

== Reactions ==
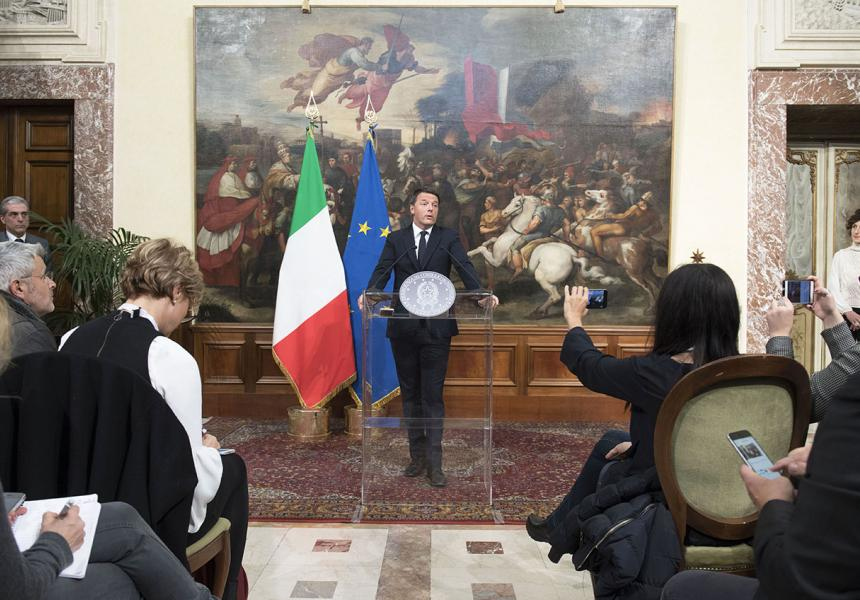
Renzi resigns after the referendum result.

After the first exit polls, Prime Minister Matteo Renzi stated in a midnight press conference that he would resign the next day. In his speech, Renzi assumed full responsibility for the referendum defeat.

The President of the Italian Republic Sergio Mattarella asked Matteo Renzi to briefly postpone his resignation, to complete the parliamentary approval of the next year's budget law. After the budget was passed on 7 December, Renzi resigned that night.

Financial markets were not particularly affected by the defeat of the constitutional reform: the Milan stock exchange closed the Monday session relatively stable (−0.2% on respect of previous Friday closing, before the vote), while on Tuesday 6 December the stock index jumped at +4.15% (best result since 11 March 2016).

To assure Italy stability, on 11 December 2016 President Sergio Mattarella gave Paolo Gentiloni the task of constituting a new government.

== See also ==
- Constitutional laws of Italy
- Constitution of Italy
- 1969 French constitutional referendum

== Bibliography ==
- Di Mauro, Danilo; Memoli, Vincenzo (February 2018). "Targeting the Government in the Referendum: The Aborted 2016 Italian Constitutional Reform". Italian Political Science Review. 48 (2). Cambridge University Press: 133–157. doi:10.1017/ipo.2017.31. S2CID 158555880.
- Negri, Fedra; Rebessi, Elisa (January 2018). "Was Mattarella Worth the Trouble? Explaining the Failure of the 2016 Italian Constitutional Referendum". Italian Political Science Review. 48 (2). Cambridge University Press: 177–196. doi:10.1017/ipo.2017.29. hdl:2434/562060. S2CID 158906172.
