= Statute of Sicily =

The Statute of Sicily establishes the rule of Sicily as an Autonomous Region within the political unity of the Italian State, and was issued by King Umberto II of Savoy, on 15 May 1946, after a separatist clash provoked by the Via Maqueda massacre in 1944. Its enactment has thus preceded the birth of the Italian Constitution, of which the statute would become an integral part on February 26, 1948.

The statute was drafted by a commission formed by politicians of the Committee of National Liberation, accompanied by three law professors of the University of Palermo. The three lawyers made a crucial contribution; in particular administrative law expert Giovanni Salemi drafted the entire text of the bill containing the Statute. The process of drafting began on May 13, 1945, a year before its enactment.

The principles constituting the text were intended to define the character of the Sicilian Region. The new entity, in addition to being equipped with tangible assets like land and people, under the Statute also had intangible items such as powers. This power was given to the Sicilian Region for its development. The right to adopt legal standards was major, assuming an identity that differentiates it from the State despite the commitment to maintain its political unity.

The statute stipulated that all state property and assets, except those involving the defense of the State or services of national character, go from the Italian state to the Sicilian Region and that it should provide for their financial needs with its taxes.

The special statute was provided for the establishment of a High Court established in Rome appointed to ensure compliance with the limits of the different powers of the Region and State and the principles enshrined in the Constitution. The High Court, with one major ruling of July 19, 1948, enshrined the principle of the immutability of the statute with an ordinary law of the State. After ten years, its power to affirm a judicial review on laws has been stripped by the Constitutional Court.

The statute also establishes the governing bodies of the Region: the Sicilian Regional Assembly, the Executive and the President of the Region.

== Principles of the Staff Regulations ==
According to the principles of the Autonomous Statute, the Region has exclusive competence in certain matters; in essence, Sicily can legislate with its acts in the areas indicated both in the Constitution and in the Statute. Any amendment to the Statute, since it is a constitutional law, is subject to the so-called "aggravated" procedure (iter legis aggravato), which requires majority approval in both Houses of the Italian Parliament (see Italian Parliament § Amendments to the Constitution and to constitutional laws).

The Region was born as an entity originally sovereign and linked to Italy by a contractual and potentially equal relationship. This legal condition, which gives rise to the use of the adjective after the official name of the institution (Regione Siciliana), is due mainly to political reasons at that time when the Sicilian administrative entity is considered a primary source of law.

=== Exclusive competences ===
According to the Special Statute, the Region has exclusive competence in several matters, including cultural, heritage, agriculture, fisheries, local authorities, environment, tourism, forestry police. The relative staff is therefore in the roles of the Region and not of the State, which is therefore larger than in the other regions with ordinary statutes.

As far as tax matters are concerned, all taxes collected in Sicily should remain on the island. By Articles 36 and following of its Statute (Constitutional Law No. 2 of February 26, 1948), the Sicilian Region is endowed with complete financial and fiscal autonomy.

Every year the Italian State would be required to provide an amount to be established, with a five-year plan, of public money coming from the other regions to finance Sicily, as established by art. Article 38 of the Statute of the Sicilian Region.

1. The State will pay annually to the Region, as a national solidarity, a sum to be used, based on an economic plan, in the execution of public works.
2. This sum will tend to balance the lower amount of labor income in the region in comparison with the national average.
3. A five-year review of this allocation will be carried out concerning changes in the data taken for the previous calculation.

Another important aspect is contained in Article 37 of the Statute of the Sicilian Region:

1. For industrial and commercial enterprises, which have their headquarters outside the territory of the Region, but which have factories and plants in it, the share of income to be attributed to the plants and plants themselves is determined in the assessment of income.
2. The tax, relating to that share, is the responsibility of the Region and is collected by the collecting authorities of the same.

Both public entities like the Corte dei Conti and private ones like Eurispes demonstrated that the Statute of Sicily is not respected.

Moreover, a council member of the former Sicilian Government led by Rosario Crocetta: Alessandro Baccei declared that the Italian State subtracts, every year, more than 7 billion euros, deriving from Sicilian taxes that are not sent to the Sicilian Treasury Cash.
