= Gazzetta Ufficiale =

Government gazette of Italy

The Gazzetta Ufficiale della Repubblica Italiana (lit. 'Official Gazette of the Italian Republic') is the official journal of record of the Italian government. It is published by the Istituto Poligrafico e Zecca dello Stato in Rome.

== Function ==
The Gazzetta Ufficiale promulgates acts of the Italian Parliament (comprising the Senate of the Republic and Chamber of Deputies) and Decrees of the President of the Republic. On publication, legislation begins a brief period (usually 15 days) known as vacatio legis, allowing for it to become widely known before taking legal effect. Part I comprises the General Series, published every weekday, together with the following special editions:

Edition	Content	Published
1st Special Series	Constitutional Court	Wednesday
2nd Special Series	European Communities	Monday and Thursday
3rd Special Series	The Regions	Saturday
4th Special Series	Contests and Examinations	Tuesday and Friday
5th Special Series	Public Contracts	Monday, Wednesday and Friday

Part II, containing all other notices, is published on Tuesdays, Thursdays and Saturdays. The 5th Special Series has been published since 3 January 2007, bringing together listings published, until 31 December 2006, in Part II under Announcements and Auction Notices. The Gazzetta Ufficiale was formerly available for free online consultation for a period of 60 days. A subscription was required to access back issues. From 1 January 2013, the Ministry of Economy and Finance, in agreement with the Ministry of Justice, and with the contribution of the Poligrafico Institute and Mint of the State, makes available in its various series, free of charge, the Official Journal in digital format .

== History ==
The Gazzetta Ufficiale derives from the Gazzetta Piemontese, the official newspaper of the Kingdom of Sardinia, which published from 2 August 1814 to 31 December 1859. An earlier Gazzetta Piemontese had been published from 1797 to 1800, but was suspended during the Napoleonic period. Publication resumed with the Restoration and in 1848 the subtitle Giornale Ufficiale del Regno ("Official Journal of the Kingdom") was added.

The newspaper became the Gazzetta Ufficiale del Regno on 4 January 1860, then Gazzetta Ufficiale del Regno d'Italia ("Official Gazette of the Kingdom of Italy") on 17 March 1861, and finally, Gazzetta Ufficiale della Repubblica Italiana after the institutional referendum on the form of state held on 2 June 1946. The Gazzetta Piemontese title was revived as an unconnected newspaper in 1867; in 1895 it became the national daily La Stampa, published in Turin. Project AU.G.U.STO. (Automazione Gazzetta Ufficiale Storica) has begun to make the entire collection of Gazzetta Ufficiale del Regno d'Italia available free of charge online.

== See also ==
- Official Journal of the European Union
