= Overseas constituencies of the Italian Parliament =

Constituency for Italian general elections

Italian overseas constituencies

The overseas constituencies (Italian: circoscrizioni estero, sg. circoscrizione) consist of four electoral zones which elect Deputies and Senators to the Italian Parliament. Italy is one of the few countries to reserve seats for those citizens residing abroad. Since 2020, there have been eight such seats in the Chamber of Deputies and four in the Senate of the Republic.

== History ==
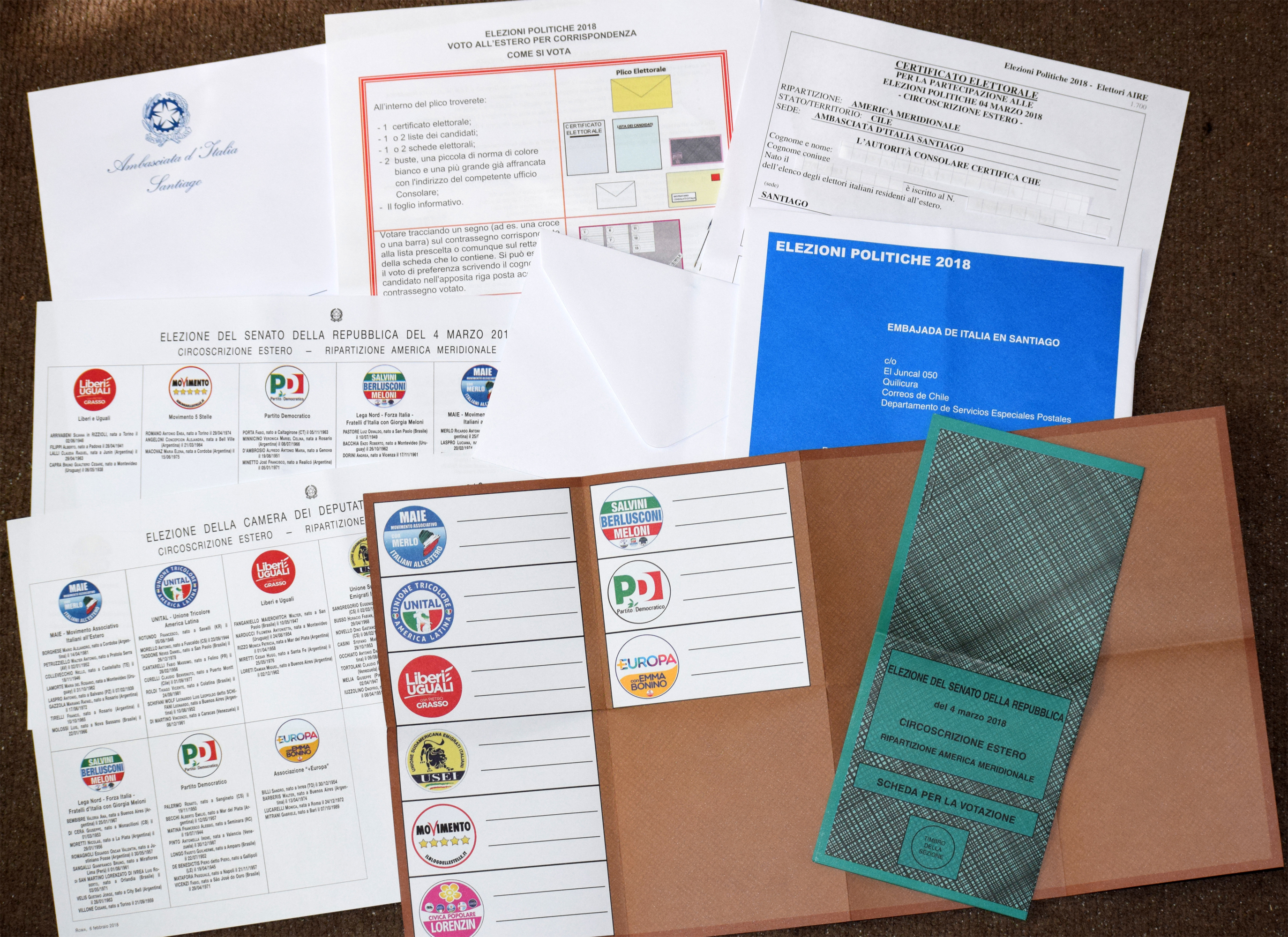
Electoral package sent to an Italian voter in South America for the 2018 general election.

Italian citizens living outside of Italy have always had the right to vote in all referendums and elections being held in Italy (provided they had registered their residence abroad with their relevant consulate). However, until late 2001, any citizen wishing to vote was required physically to return to the city or town in Italy where they were registered on the electoral roll. The only exception to this rule was for the Italian elections to the European Parliament, in which since 1979 voters could cast their ballot at their nearest consulate, but only if they had their residence in one of the other EU countries.

Until 2001 the Italian Republic offered citizens living abroad a free return train journey to their home town in Italy in order to vote. However, the only portion of the train journey that was free of charge was on Italian soil. Any costs incurred in getting from their place of residence abroad to the Italian border had to be covered by the citizen wanting to vote. Therefore, a free return train journey was hardly an incentive for the large Italian communities living as far away as in the United States, Argentina or Australia. For this reason very few Italians abroad made use of this right to vote, unless they lived in cities and towns that bordered Italy, such as in Germany, Switzerland, France and Austria. Various Italian minorities living abroad (notably in the United States) protested frequently at this lack of political representation, especially if they paid taxes on property owned in Italy.

After numerous years of petitioning and fierce debate, the Italian government, in late 2001, finally passed a law allowing Italian citizens living abroad to vote in elections in Italy by postal ballot. Italians wishing to exercise this right must first register their residence abroad with their relevant consulate. The first vote by Italians living abroad by postal ballot was for 2 referendums in 2003 and for both chambers of the Italian parliament in 2006: twelve seats in the Chamber of Deputies and six seats in the Senate of the Republic.

In 2016, a constitutional referendum was held in order to change the Constitution of Italy. The proposed constitution, put forward by the then Prime Minister Matteo Renzi, would have eliminated the seats assigned to the overseas constituencies in the Senate of the Republic. Almost 60% of voters voted against the constitutional reform, which therefore was rejected, and Renzi tendered his resignation. However, Italians living abroad voted the opposite way (with 65% saying "yes"), thus asking to eliminate their own seats in the Senate.

On 8 October 2019, the Chamber of Deputies approved in the fourth reading the constitutional reform that will reduce from the 19th legislature the number of parliamentarians, including those elected abroad that will decrease from 18 to 12 elected, of which 8 deputies and 4 senators.

== Constituencies ==
Each of the four constituencies elects at least one Deputy and one Senator, with the remaining seats distributed between the electoral zones in proportion to the number of Italian citizens resident in each. As of the most recent election, the seats are distributed as follows:

Constituency	Citizens	Deputies	Senators
Europe (including Russia, Turkey and Greenland)	3,000,000	3	1
South America	2,000,000	2	1
North and Central America	500,000	2	1
Africa, Asia, Oceania and Antarctica	300,000	1	1

== See also ==
- Constituencies for French residents overseas
- Italian diaspora
- Right of expatriates to vote in their country of origin
