= 1989 Italian advisory referendum =

| 18 June 1989 |
- Do you believe that we must proceed with the transformation of the European Communities into an effective Union, endowed with a Government accountable to Parliament, entrusting the European Parliament itself with the mandate to draw up a draft European Constitution to be submitted directly for ratification by the competent bodies of the States community members?

Results
| Choice | Votes | % |
|---|---|---|
| Yes | 29,189,777 | 88.07% |
| No | 3,954,998 | 11.93% |
| Valid votes | 33,144,775 | 88.36% |
| Invalid or blank votes | 4,364,611 | 11.64% |
| Total votes | 37,509,386 | 100.00% |
| Registered voters/turnout | 46,323,415 | 80.97% |
- Results of the referendum by province. Blue indicates a majority in favour; red indicates a majority against.

An advisory referendum on the European Economic Community was held in Italy on 18 June 1989, alongside European elections. The non-binding referendum was called by all main parties with a special law, because the Italian Constitution does not allow this type of question. The Italian political spectrum wanted to re-affirm the popular support of Italy to the process of European integration, particularly giving to the European Parliament a popular, constitutional mandate in event of a future European Constitution.

== Result ==
| Choice | Votes | % |
|---|---|---|
| ✓ Yes | 29,189,777 | 88.1 |
| No | 3,954,998 | 11.9 |
| Invalid/blank votes | 4,364,611 | – |
| Total | 37,509,415 | 100 |
| Registered voters/turnout | 46,323,415 | 81.0 |
Source: Nohlen & Stöver
