= 2006 Italian constitutional referendum =

- 26 June 2006
- Do you approve the text of the Constitutional Law concerning "Amendments to Part II of the Constitution" approved by Parliament and published in the Official Gazette no. 269 of 18 November 2005?

Results
Choice	Votes	%
Yes	9,970,513	38.71%
No	15,783,269	61.29%
Valid votes	25,753,782	98.63%
Invalid or blank votes	357,143	1.37%
Total votes	26,110,925	100.00%
Eligible to vote/turnout	49,772,506	52.46%
- Results by region; Yes: 50–60%; No: 80–90% 70–80% 60–70% 50–60%

A constitutional referendum was held in Italy on 25 and 26 June 2006. The reforms were proposed and initially approved during Berlusconi II and III cabinet between October 2004 and November 2005. If ultimately approved by referendum, in continuation with the 2001 constitutional enacted modifications, these reforms would have substantially completed the transformation of Italy from a unitary state into a federal republic.

The proposals were opposed by incumbent Prodi II Cabinet, and were rejected by 61% of voters.

== Background ==
The second confirmatory referendum in Italian republican history, launched on the initiative of the center-right legislature XIV, it aimed at modifying the second part of the Constitution of Italy in several respects. The constitutional law revision, approved by an absolute majority of the members of the Italian Parliament, according to the provisions of art. 138 of the constitution, had opened the possibility to the request for confirmation by one of the three subjects provided for by the article. This request was received by more than one fifth of the members of a chamber, by more than 500,000 voters and by more than five regional councils.

Voters were asked whether they approved of amending 57 articles of the constitution. They would have given more power to the Prime Minister by allowing him or her to dissolve parliament, appoint and dismiss ministers, and control government policy. The President of Italy would have become guarantor of the constitution and the republic's federal unity.

The reforms would have also ended Italy's perfect bicameralism: the Chamber of Deputies would have been given responsibility for foreign policy, defense and immigration, and the Senate – renamed "Federal Senate" – responsibility for nationwide federal law. The Italian Parliament as a whole would have undergone a reduction in the number of deputies (from 630 to 518) and senators (from 315 to 252) for a total cut of 175 MPs, down from 945 to 770 seats. Consequently, the reforms would also have increased the power of the regions, giving them control of education, healthcare, law and order, as well as giving them representation in the Supreme Court of Cassation.

== Results ==
Choice	Votes	%
For	9,970,513	38.71
Against	15,783,269	61.29
Total	25,753,782	100.00
Valid votes	25,753,782	98.63
Invalid votes	255,714	0.98
Blank votes	101,429	0.39
Total votes	26,110,925	100.00
Registered voters/turnout	49,772,506	52.46
Source: Dipartimento per gli Affari Interni e Territoriali
