= 2001 Italian constitutional referendum =

- 7 October 2001
- Approve the text of the constitutional law concerning "Amendments to Title V of the second part of the Constitution" approved by Parliament and published in the Official Gazette no. 59 of March 12, 2001?

Results
Choice	Votes	%
Yes	10,438,419	64.21%
No	5,819,187	35.79%
Valid votes	16,257,606	96.81%
Invalid or blank votes	535,685	3.19%
Total votes	16,793,291	100.00%
Eligible to vote/turnout	49,454,954	33.96%

A constitutional referendum was held in Italy on 7 October 2001. The amendment was supported by the Silvio Berlusconi government. Voters were asked whether they approved of amending the constitution to give more powers to the regions of Italy on issues including agriculture, education, healthcare, and taxation. The proposals were approved by 64% of voters.

The resulting constitutional changes are subject of conflicting opinions regarding the practical success of the amendment; in its most evident outcome, the text of Article 117 of the Constitution of Italy was inverted: whereas the original text listed the areas where the regions had legislative authority, where the regions and the state had shared authority, and leaving any other subject matter in the hands of the state, the new version of this article lists a series of subjects as areas of legislative authority of the state, with others having shared authority and anything that is not specifically mentioned being included in the legislative authority of the regions.

== Results ==
Choice	Votes	%
For	10,438,419	64.21
Against	5,819,187	35.79
Total	16,257,606	100.00
Valid votes	16,257,606	96.81
Invalid/blank votes	535,685	3.19
Total votes	16,793,291	100.00
Registered voters/turnout	49,454,954	33.96

== See also ==
- Referendums in Italy

== Bibliography ==
- Nohlen, Dieter; Stöver, Philip (2010). Elections in Europe: A Data Handbook. Nomos. ISBN 978-3-8329-5609-7 – via Google Books.
- Willan, Philip (8 October 2001). "Italians vote on extending rights to the regions". The Guardian. ISSN 0261-3077.
