= Poggiolini =

Poggiolini may refer to:

- Carla Mazzuca Poggiolini (born 1943), Italian journalist and politician
- Danilo Poggiolini (born 1932), Italian physician and politician
- Duilio Poggiolini (1929–2020), Italian professor and government bureaucrat convicted of fraud
