= Juan de Garay Otáñez y Rada =

Spanish army officer (1586–1650)

Juan de Garay
- Born: 14 July 1586; Madrid
- Died: 15 April 1650 (aged 63) Gelsa, Aragón
- Rank: General
- Conflicts: Siege of Breda (1624–1645); Siege of 's-Hertogenbosch (1629); Capture of Maastricht (1632); Franco-Spanish War (1635–1659); Battle of Tornavento; Siege of Leucate (1637); Reapers' War; Siege of Ille-sur-Têt

Juan de Garay Otáñez y Rada, 1st Marquis of Villarrubia de Langre (1586–1650), was a Spanish military officer who, rising through the ranks, went on to command three armies of Spain, those of Extremadura, Guipúzcoa and Catalonia.

== Early career ==
Orphaned at the age of three, Garay was brought up in the household of the Duke of Feria. At the age of 14, he enlisted as a page/armour-bearer and went to Italy. Despite being a protege of the Duke, who would soon after become the viceroy of Sicily, his military career was slow and, finally, in 1623, as a captain of the tercio raised by Pedro Henriquez de Acevedo, Count of Fuentes, he went to Flanders, where he spent eleven years, seeing action at the sieges of Breda (1624) and 's-Hertogenbosch (1629), at the Capture of Maastricht (1632) and at Stevenswert (1632). He had been admitted into the Order of Santiago in 1629.

== Franco-Spanish War (1635–1659) ==
In 1635 he was sent to Italy and given command of the tercio in the valley of Valtellina, which had been invaded by French troops. There, he saw action at Morbegno (13 October), and at the Battle of Tornavento. On 1 July 1636, he was given command of the Lombardy Tercio, the oldest tercio in the Spanish army, when its commander, Martín de Aragón, was promoted to Captain general of Artillery. However, a few months later, the Marquis of Leganés relieved Garay of that command, sending him back to Madrid, when Garay refused to obey Aragón, his superior, on the basis that as commanding officer of Spain's oldest tercio, he was not under Aragón's command.

However, following his bravery at the defeat at Leucate in 1637, action for which he had volunteered, Garay was pardoned by King Felipe IV, who ordered him back to Italy and recommended him for promotion. Later that year, Leganés had Garay arrested for challenging a Grandee of Spain, Filippo Spinola, son of Ambrogio Spinola, to a duel. Again back in favour, in May 1638 Garay was promoted to Captain general of Artillery, substituting Aragón, who had been promoted to Captain general of Cavalry. The animosity between Aragón and Garay led to Leganés sending the latter back to Spain to review which fortifications were in urgent need of works.

When Aragón was killed the following March while reviewing the castle at Cengio, Garay was ordered back to Italy to continue the campaign there. Leaving Vercelli in April 1639, he marched into Piedmont, crossing the Po at Pontestura. Seeing that it had been reinforced, he continued the march to Verrua Savoia, which he took after a four-hour siege on 5 April. He then proceeded to take the fortress at Crescentino, on 11 April, having been joined by the main army led by the Marquis of Leganés. Both commanders then marched on Turin, arriving there on 16 April. Although they did not have enough troops to lay siege to the city, their proximity was enough to draw reinforcements which left the rest of the region of Monferrato unprotected. They therefore marched on Villanova d’Asti, which they took on the 27th. On 30 April, they besieged the citadel there, which surrendered six days later; in the meantime they took Pontestura and the stronghold at Agliano.

In 1640, on reviewing the fortifications at San Sebastián, Garay proposed several major improvements and the following year he proposed the construction of a citadel connecting La Mota castle, on Mount Urgull, to the town, proposal which was finally rejected.

Following the events of the Corpus de Sang that was to trigger the Reapers' War that May, the King gave Garay command of the tercios quartered in Roussillon. Garay arrested several leading local figures in August, causing the viceroy to write to him "begging him not to provoke a complete break with the Catalans because this might entail the loss of the Principality and the ruin of Spain". The following September, Garay was wounded by two musket shots at the Siege of Ille-sur-Têt.

On 11 October 1640, Garay wrote to the King that the "licentiousness of the clerics and the religious in the convents of this diocese, all of whom have reached the last stages of sedition for in the confessionals and the pulpits they spend their entire time rousing the people and offering the rebels encouragement and advice, inducing the ignorant to believe that rebellion will win them the kingdom of heaven".

In 1641, Garay projected several major improvements to the Citadel of Pamplona and the works were concluded in 1646, in time for the King to visit them.

Although it is not clear whether Juan de Garay saw action at the Battle of Montjuïc (1641), following the defeat there, the Marquis of Los Vélez "gave Garay full command" to ensure the safe return of the beaten army to Tarragona. In reward for his services, Philip IV promoted him to maestre de campo general and governor of Arms of Extremadura, commissioning him to assess the state of the fortifications in Navarre and Guipúzcoa. On his arrival at Badajoz, he was sidelined by the Captain general, Manuel de Acevedo y Zúñiga, Count of Monterrey, and also had conflicts with other military commanders, such as the 1st Marquis of Rivas, José Ramírez de Saavedra y Ulloa, and the Count of Torrejón, leading him to resign in March 1644.

In July 1645 he was appointed Captain general of Guipúzcoa and general lieutenant to the viceroy of Navarre, Duarte Fernando Álvarez de Toledo, 7th count of Oropesa.

=== Command of the Army of Catalonia ===
In the summer of 1649, Garay was given command of the army of Catalonia and received the marquisate of Villarrubia de Langre. Although it was late in the year, Garay managed to raise a small, select army and left Lerida in September, passing through the comarca of Pla d'Urgell and attacked Vimbodi and Poblet, Cabra del Camp, Montblanc, Valls, Constantí. On reaching Tarragona, he received reinforcements and provisions and marched on Torredembarra, Vilanova i la Geltrú and Sitges, where he left garrisons. As the commander-in-chief of the French forces, John Gaspar Ferdinand de Marchin, Comte de Granville (who would later serve under Philip IV), had prepared Barcelona for an attack, Garay abandoned that line of attack and headed inland into the Penedés, where he defeated the French cavalry at Villafranca (17 October) and at Montblanc (14 November) on his way back to Lerida, having left Barcelona threatened by the spur at Sitges. Garay had planned to return to the attack after the winter but he died suddenly at Gelsa (Zaragoza), on his way back from Madrid.
