= Renzo Rosso (hydrologist) =

Italian hydrologist (born 1950)

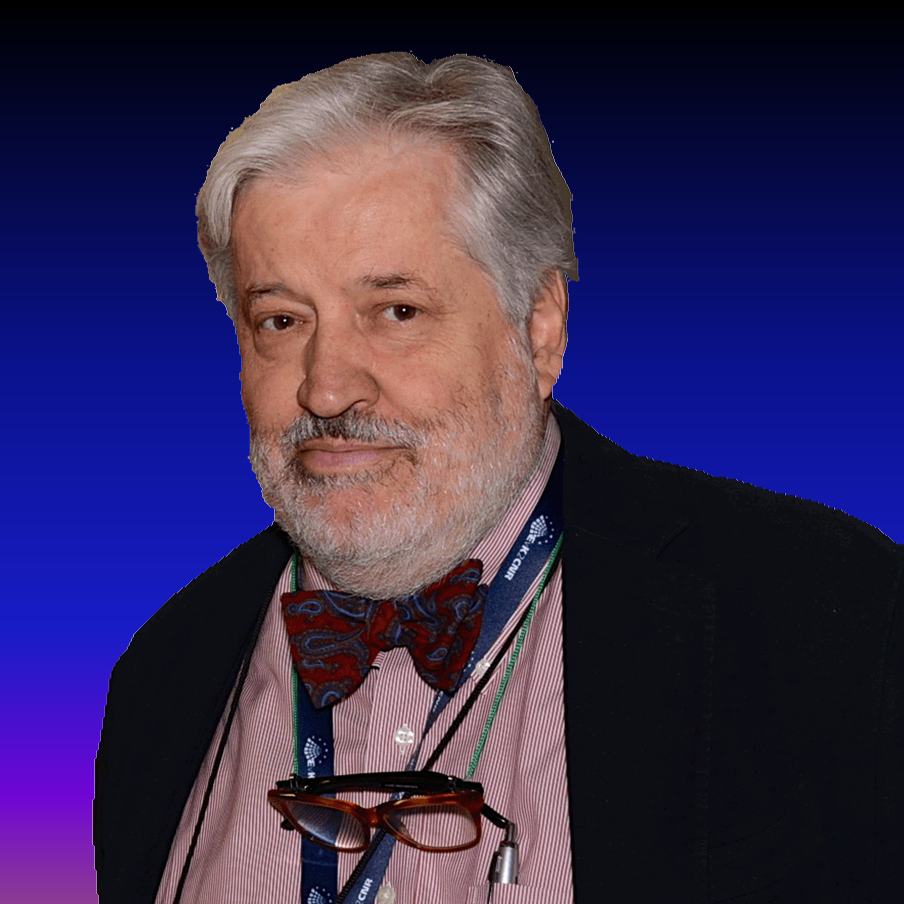
- Born: 1950 (age 75–76); Genoa, Italy
- Awards: Premio Innovazione Legambiente (2002); Henry Darcy Medalist of European Geosciences Union (2010); Borland Lecturer Award (2005); Top Italian Scientist (101-200)
- Scientific career
- Fields: Hydraulics; Hydrology; Civil Engineering
- Workplaces: Politecnico di Milano

Renzo Rosso (Genoa, 1950) is an Italian hydrologist recognized for his contributions to water resources and environmental engineering.

== Early life and education ==
Renzo Rosso was born in Genoa, Italy in 1950. He attended public schools for primary education and Liceo Cassini for High school in Genoa. In 1975, he received his degree in Civil Engineering from the University of Genoa.

His father was a Jazz musician in fascist Italy and a transportation engineer in the post-war period, and following in his footsteps, Rosso learned the rudiments of classical guitar by Maestro Vercelli. He later went on to become an amateur guitarist and singer, and currently plays in a band called Figli di un Rio Minore ("Children of a Lesser River").

He has been a professor at Polytechnic University of Milan since 1986.

== Major contributions ==
Rosso was a full professor of Hydrology and Hydraulic Constructions at Politecnico di Milano for 35 years from 1986 to 2021. Since his retirement, he has continued teaching in the Civil and Environmental Engineering Department as an adjunct professor.

His research contributions include extreme-value statistics in storm and flood hydrology, fractal river geomorphology, shallow landslides, and snow and ice hydrology of Karakoram, Himalayas. His work has influenced a great number of researchers and scholars in hydrology, hydraulics, and civil engineering: he has published over 300 papers and scientific books, and his work has been cited in over 10 thousand publications. He has also been a member of several international academic evaluation committees at universities in Canada, US, Belgium, and Sweden.

Outside of academia, Rosso has played an influential role in Italy as a hydrology and soil preservation expert, serving in numerous committees at a national level and at a regional level, primarily in the north-western maritime region of Liguria. He served in the Observatory for the Closure of the Nuclear Cycle in Italy (2014-2018), and previously in the Regional Technical Committee for soil conservation of the Liguria regional government and of the Civil Protection Technical Committee of the Province of Savona (1998-2008). Between 2002 and 2008, he served as the scientific expert for the Delegate Commissioner for remediation of a former industrial site in Cengio, an area in North-West Italy which had been contaminated by decades of polluting emissions by chemical dye manufacturer Acna. In 2012, he was elected Commissioner Delegate of the Presidency of the Council of Ministers for the safety of large dams in Liguria.

As of 2023, he was President of the Environmental Control Committee for the new Genoa highway, a large-scale infrastructural project long under construction, upon nomination of the Italian Ministry for the Environment.

Rosso has also contributed to several Italian newspapers on water and climate related matters: since 2014, he has written weekly blogs on water and environmental issues for Italian daily newspaper Il Fatto Quotidiano, and he has been an editorialist for Genoa-based newspaper Il Secolo XIX.

== Awards ==
Rosso has received several awards for his engineering and research activities.

In 2002, he received the Premio Innovazione Legambiente (2002), a yearly award by Legambiente, among Italy's foremost environmental associations.

In 2005, he won the Borland Lecture Award (2005) by the American Geophysical Union (AGU), one of the most influential associations of Earth and Space sciences worldwide.

In 2010, he was awarded the Henry Darcy Medal by the European Geosciences Union “for his fundamental contributions to hydrology and water resources management”. The medal is an annual award by the Hydrological Sciences Division of EGU, Europe's most important association in the fields of Earth, planetary, and space sciences, and is given in recognition of "outstanding scientific contributions in water resources research and water resources engineering and management".

In 2015, he was named Honorary Member of the Italian Hydrological Society, a national association promoting "the progress, enhancement, and dissemination of Hydrological Sciences" in Italy.

As of 2023, he was featured among the Top Italian Scientists under the Engineering category (101-200), a platform that ranks scientists based on their H-index, a metrics often used to measure the reach and influence of a scholar's published works.
