= Duilio =

Duilio is a given name. Notable people with the name include:

- Duilio Arigoni, Swiss chemist
- Duilio Benítez, Paraguayan footballer
- Duilio Beretta, Italian tennis player
- Duilio Brunello, Argentine politician
- Duilio Carrillo, Mexican modern pentathlete
- Duilio Davino, Mexican footballer
- Duilio Loi, Italian boxer
- Duilio Herrera, Mexican footballer
- Duilio Poggiolini, Italian manager, involved in the Mani pulite scandal
- Duilio Torres, Italian architect
- Duilio Vallebuona, Peruvian model, television personality and tennis player
- Duilio (singer), Swiss singer, represented Switzerland in the Eurovision Song Contest 1994

== See also ==
- Duílio (disambiguation)
- Italian ship Caio Duilio
