= Martín de Aragón y Tafalla =

Spanish army officer (1592–1639)

Martín de Aragón
- Born: 1592; Zaragoza, Spain
- Died: 23 March 1639 (KIA) Cengio, Italy
- Rank: General
- Conflicts: Thirty Years' War; Relief of Genoa (1625); War of the Mantuan Succession; First Siege of Casale Monferrato (1629–31); Franco-Spanish War (1635–1659); Siege of Valenza (1635); Battle of Tornavento

Martín de Aragón y Tafalla, 3rd Duke of Ampurias, (1592–1639), was a Spanish military officer who, rising through the ranks, went on to become capitán general of Cavalry, the fourth highest military rank in Spain's chain of command at the time. He was killed in action at the Castle of Cengio, Italy.

== Career ==
=== Early career ===
Having enlisted at an early age in the Armada Real, he was sent to Lombardy and from there he went on to see action at the Relief of Genoa (1625) and at the First Siege of Casale Monferrato (1629–31). Following that action, in November 1629 he was given command of the Lombardy Tercio, the oldest tercio in the Spanish army. That same year, given the imminent demilitarization following the Treaty of Cherasco, he sailed from Genoa to Cádiz with two thousand veteran Spanish soldiers, and from there to Flanders, as part of Admiral Francisco de Ribera's squadron.

=== Command ===
In 1633, Aragón's Lombardy Tercio was made up of twenty companies, totalling 197 officers and 2,321 infantry. However, given the formation of the army to be led by the Duke of Feria to Germany, the number of companies was reduced to half. In 1635, following the surprise French attack on the valley of Valtellina, the tercio was reinforced by recruits from Spain and saw action raising Marshal Créqui's siege at Valenza. By January 1636 his tercio had increased to fifteen companies but these were so raw that only three of his officers, including himself as maestre de campo, had held their commissions for more than two years. On 22 June that year, Aragón's tercio saw action at Tornavento. When Gerardo Gambacorta, the General of Cavalry, was killed in action at that battle, the Marquis of Leganés, supreme commander of Spain's armies in Italy, gave Aragón that temporary rank. However, the court preferred to give the post to the Portuguese general Felipe de Silva, while promoting Aragón to general of artillery. Command of Aragón's Lombary Tercio was then given to Juan de Garay, with whom Martín would have major disputes. However, a few months later, Leganés relieved Garay of that command, sending him back to Madrid, when Garay refused to obey Aragón, his superior, on the basis that as commanding officer of Spain's oldest tercio, he was not under Aragón's command. In May 1638, when Aragón was promoted to captain general of cavalry, Garay took his place as captain general of artillery but the continued animosity between Aragón and Garay led Leganés to send the latter back to Spain to review which fortifications were in urgent need of works.

=== Last campaigns and death ===
In 1638, Aragón was proposed as commander-in-chief of Spain's third most important army, that of the Duchy of Milan, the Milanesado. However, once again, the Olivares selected another candidate, the viceroy of Sicily, Francisco de Melo, a Portuguese nobleman with no military experience. Martín was promoted to capitán general of Cavalry, and later that year, led the Spanish troops to victories at the Siege of Breme (26 April), where the French military commander, the Duke of Lesdiguieres (Créquy) had been killed the previous month, and at Ponzone (26 September), as well as at Vercelli, serving under the Marquis of Leganés.

The following March, Aragón was killed by a musket shot to the head while reviewing the castle at Cengio, and Garay was ordered back to Italy to continue the campaign there.
