= Siege of Breme (1638) =

Siege during the Franco-Spanish War (1635–1659)

- Part of Franco-Spanish War (1635–1659)
- Engraving of Leganés's capture of Breme
Date	13–26 March 1638
Location	Breme, Lombardy
Result	Spanish victory

Belligerents
Kingdom of France	Spain

Commanders and leaders
(Kingdom of France) Duke of Lesdiguieres	(Spain) Marquis of Leganés (Spain) Martín de Aragón

The siege of Breme (13–26 March 1638) was undertaken by Spanish forces under the Marquis of Leganés, Governor of Milan during the Franco-Spanish War (1635-1659), although it was Martín de Aragón, as capitán general of Cavalry, who is credited with putting an end to the siege.

Breme, in Lombardy, is located on the border between the Duchy of Milan and Montferrat. The Fortress of Breme, having been taken by the French and reconquered by the Spanish after a long and bloody siege, was an important pentagonal fortress (trace italienne) that covered Cazal and Vercelli, and also defended both Montferrat and the Piedmont.

After being sent to aid the beleaguered fortress, the French military commander, the Duke of Lesdiguieres (also known as Marshal Créquy) was killed there while reconnoitring, on 17 March 1638.

The French garrison, under the governor Mongallar, comprised 1,800 men. When they capitulated, they were allowed to march out with their arms. They left behind 17 artillery pieces. Leganés then left a garrison of 2,000 infantes and two companies of horse.

== Besieging force ==
The field officers, or higher, including the captains of the tercios that took part, or whose units were present at the siege, included the following:

- Marquis of Leganés
- Felipe da Silva
- Martín de Aragón
- Francisco de Orozco, 2nd Marquis of Mortara
- Ferrante Limonti (Limonte)
- Vicente Gonzaga
- Álvaro de Quiñones
- Tiberio Brancaccio
- Juan Vázquez Coronado
- Carlos de la Gata (Carlo della Gata)
- Antonio Sottello (Sotelo)
- Antonio Bolognino (Count Boloñín)
- Colonel Gil de Hays (Gil de Aix or Ays)
- Prince Borso d'Este

On his way to the siege, Tiberio Brancaccio's tercio stopped off at the fortress at Sartirana Lomellina, whose garrison of 60 men and their captain they captured after a few exchanges of cannon fire.

While at Breme, Leganés also took the fortress at Verrua (10 April) and at Crescentino (11 April).

Following his success at Breme, Leganés then prepared to besiege Vercelli, which he did from 26/7 May to 6 July 1638.

The Royal Collection Trust has two etchings and engravings, printed on paper, of the siege; one, a high oblique view, by Bernardino Bassano (fl. 1635-38), with a key in Italian and another, oriented with north to top, by Giovanni Paolo Bianchi (fl. 1617-54), with a key in Spanish. Both show the location where the French military commander (maresciallo Chirichi, in Italian) was killed.
