= Castelnuovo di Ceva =

- Comune
- Comune di Castelnuovo di Ceva
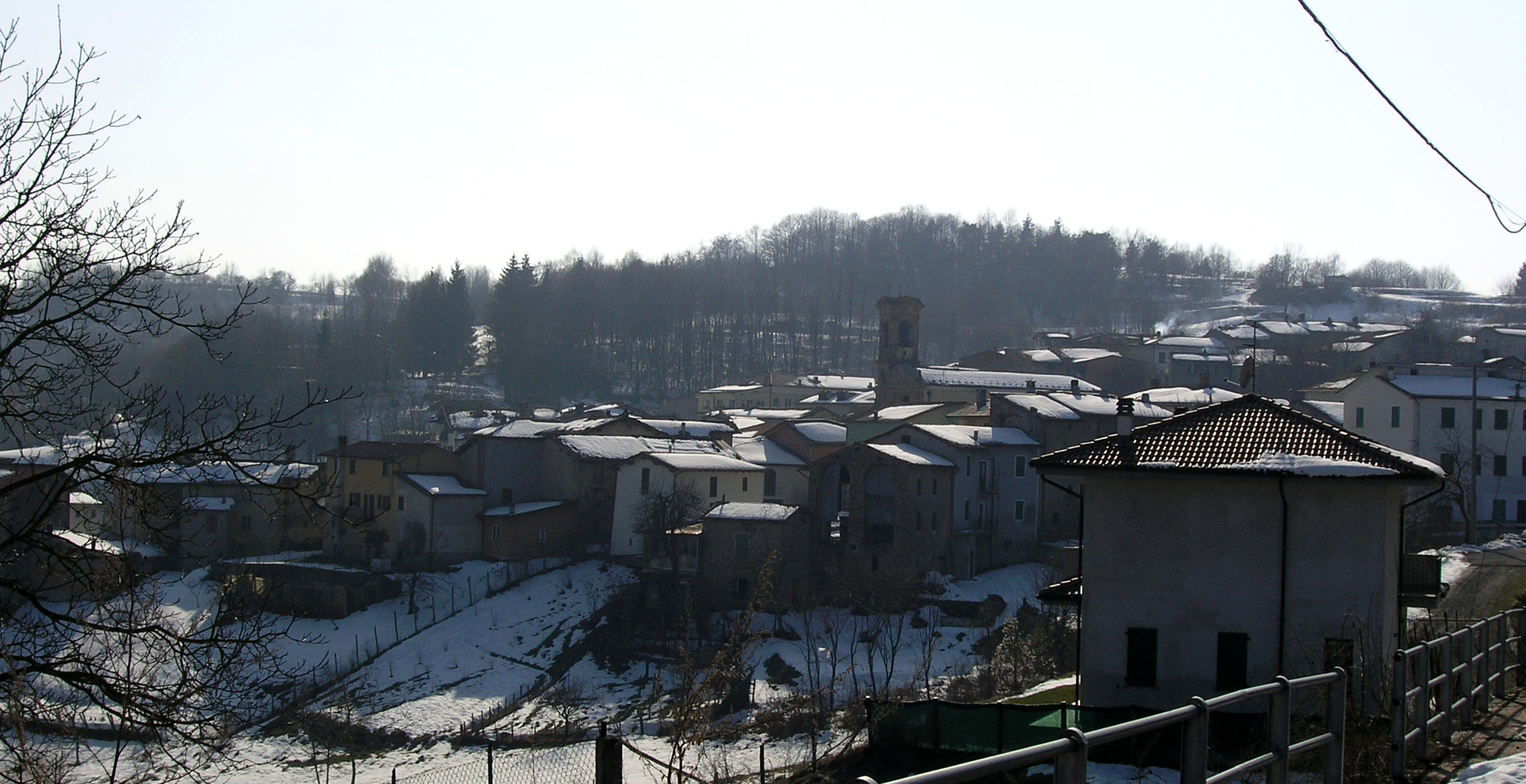

- Coat of arms

- Location within Italy Location within Piedmont
- Coordinates: 44°21′N 8°8′E
- Country: Italy
- Region: Piedmont
- Province: Cuneo (CN)

Government
  - Mayor: Mauro Rebuffo

Area
  - Total: 6.26 km^{2} (2.42 sq mi)
- Elevation: 743 m (2,438 ft)

Population (30 November 2017)
  - Total: 117
  - Density: 18.7/km^{2} (48.4/sq mi)
- Demonym: Castelnovesi
- Time zone: UTC+1 (CET)
  - Summer (DST): UTC+2 (CEST)
- Postal code: 12070
- Dialing code: 0174
- Website: Official website

Castelnuovo di Ceva is a comune (municipality) in the Province of Cuneo in the Italian region Piedmont, located about 90 kilometres (56 mi) southeast of Turin and about 45 kilometres (28 mi) east of Cuneo.

Castelnuovo di Ceva borders the following municipalities: Montezemolo, Murialdo, Priero, and Roccavignale.
