= Martin of Aragon (disambiguation) =

Martin of Aragon or Martín de Aragón may refer to:

- Martin of Aragon (1356–1410), King of Aragon and Sicily
- Martin I of Sicily (1374/75/76–1409), King of Sicily and Crown Prince of Aragon
- Martin of Aragon, Heir of Sicily (1406–1407), Crown Prince of Sicily
- Martín de Aragón y Tafalla (1592–1639), Spanish duke and military officer
