= San Giovanni Battista, Verrua Savoia =

Church building in Verrua Savoia, Italy

Coordinates: 45.16089°N 8.09597°E

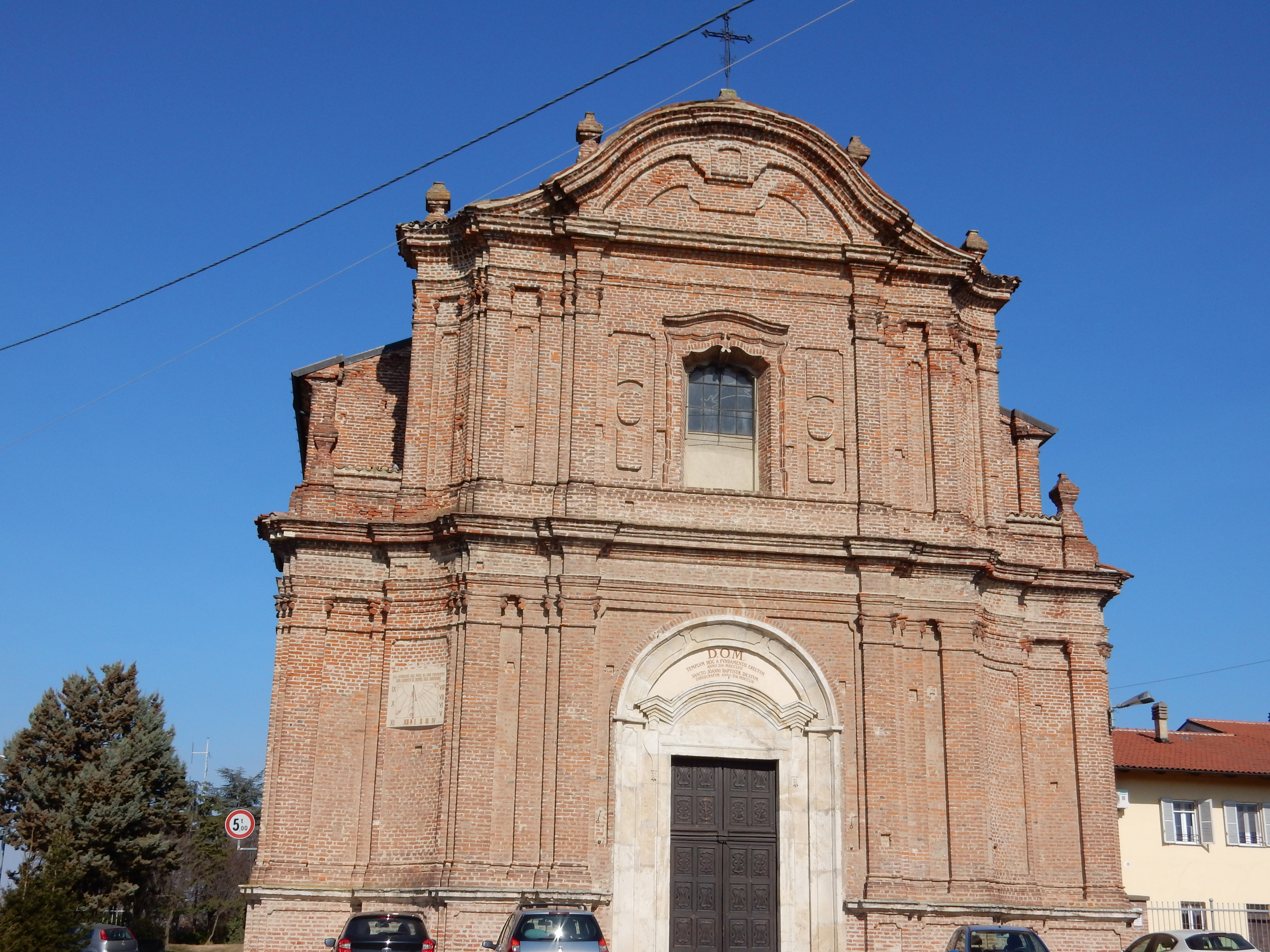
San Giovanni battista from outside

San Giovanni Battista is a late-Baroque-style, Roman Catholic parish church located in the town of Verrua Savoia in the Metropolitan City of Turin, region of Piedmont, Italy.

== History ==
Until 1705, the parish church of the town was within the walls of the medieval fort, but it was destroyed that year by the besieging French armies en route to the Siege of Turin. Count Scaglia lobbied to rebuild the church in his neighborhood, thus reconstruction of a parish church was delayed until 1749, and the design was assigned to the architect Andrea Levis and builder Matteo Ronco. The church we see now was consecrated in 1759. The brick facade has a central projection, marked by an abundance of pilasters, and a rounded marble portal. The roof-line has decorative urns.
