= ACNA (company) =

Italian chemical company

National Dyes Company and Affiliates
- Trade name: ACNA
- Native name: Azienda Coloranti Nazionali e Affini
- Industry: Chemical
- Predecessor: Società Italiana Prodotti Esplodenti (1906-1925)
- Founded: 1929 in Saliceto, Piedmont, Italy
- Founder: Italgas
- Defunct: 2001
- Fate: Bankruptcy
- Area served: Italy
- Products: organic secondary chemicals, pigments, dyes
- Services: Chemical
- Parent: IG Farben

National Dyes Company and Affiliates (Italian: Azienda Coloranti Nazionali e Affini), more commonly known as the ACNA, was the first Italian chemical company, active from 1929 to 1999 in Cengio (main plant), as well as in Cesano Maderno and Rho, although it traces back to 1882 under different names. The company was best known for the pollution of land and waters related to its production of dyes earning it the nickname of "the poison factory" which would see it brought before the Italian government.

== History ==
ACNA traces its origins to the dynamite factory Dinamitificio Barberi, founded on March 26, 1882, in Cegnio, Italy. The factory would change hands to the Italian Society of Explosive Products in 1906 and would see their explosives used in conflicts between Italy and Ethiopia War and the Italo-Turkish War. The factory would be retooled in 1908 to produce Sulfuric Acid, Oleum, and TNT, during which the earliest evidence of pollution from the company began to be noticed. The Cengio factory would be taken over by Italgas in 1925 and would later be grouped with the Rho and Cesano Maderno plants to establish the first ACNA, the Associated National Chemical Companies, which began producing dyes. As the Cengio factory began to retool for the production of dyes for the textile industry, the ACNA became the first Italian producer of synthetic dyes.

In 1931, Italgas was forced to sell ACNA to IG Farben and Montecatini who kept the acronym but changed the name to Azienda Coloranti Nazionali e Affini and resumed production of explosives and toxic gases, which were used in the Second Italo-Abyssinian War and in Eritrea. ACNA would first be brought to court for damages caused by pollution in 1938.

ACNA would follow Montecatini during their merger to Edison in 1966. After leaving the world of weapons manufacturing, they instead focused on the production of synthetic dyes, notably including fabric dyes such as indigo and naphthylamine.

== Environmental controversy ==
It was discovered that the long-standing deterioration of the environment surrounding these factories was being caused by ACNA, improperly dumping chemical waste. As a result of this practice, a ground well over 10^{6}m^{3} and up to 20m thick became contaminated, along with substantial contamination of the nearby Bormida river. This would contribute to the creation of the so-called "triangle of death" in Italy, a hotbed of illegal dumping in the country. Regional governments, like that of Piedmont would claim damages caused by ACNA in the aftermath of the findings related to the Bormida Valley.

ACNA's Genoa factory was polluting with chlorinated phenols, producing 48 tonnes of waste for 30 tonnes of product. The Italian Minister of the Environment would even shut down the plant for 6 months in an attempt to improve conditions.

They would additionally be investigated by the Italian Chamber of Deputies under a commission of inquiry headed by Carla Mazzuca Poggiolini. This would be followed by an additional inquiry in 2000 about the waste which would discover 800,000 tonnes of waste in the Pianura landfill stemming from the Cengio factory.

== Culture ==
Books

- Andrea Dotta, “La chimica a Cengio: storie di battaglie e conflitti dentro e fuori i cancelli”, a cura della Federazione Italiana Lavoratori Chimici e Affini di Savona, 1997.
- Alessandro Hellmann, "Cent'anni di veleno. Il caso ACNA. L'ultima guerra civile italiana", Stampa Alternativa, Collana Strade Bianche, Viterbo, 2005.

Movies

- Il Caso ACNA: Storie di Lotte e Ordinari Inquinamenti, a documentary made in 2005 on the pollution caused by the ACNA
