= Sylvester Mazzolini =

Italian theologian

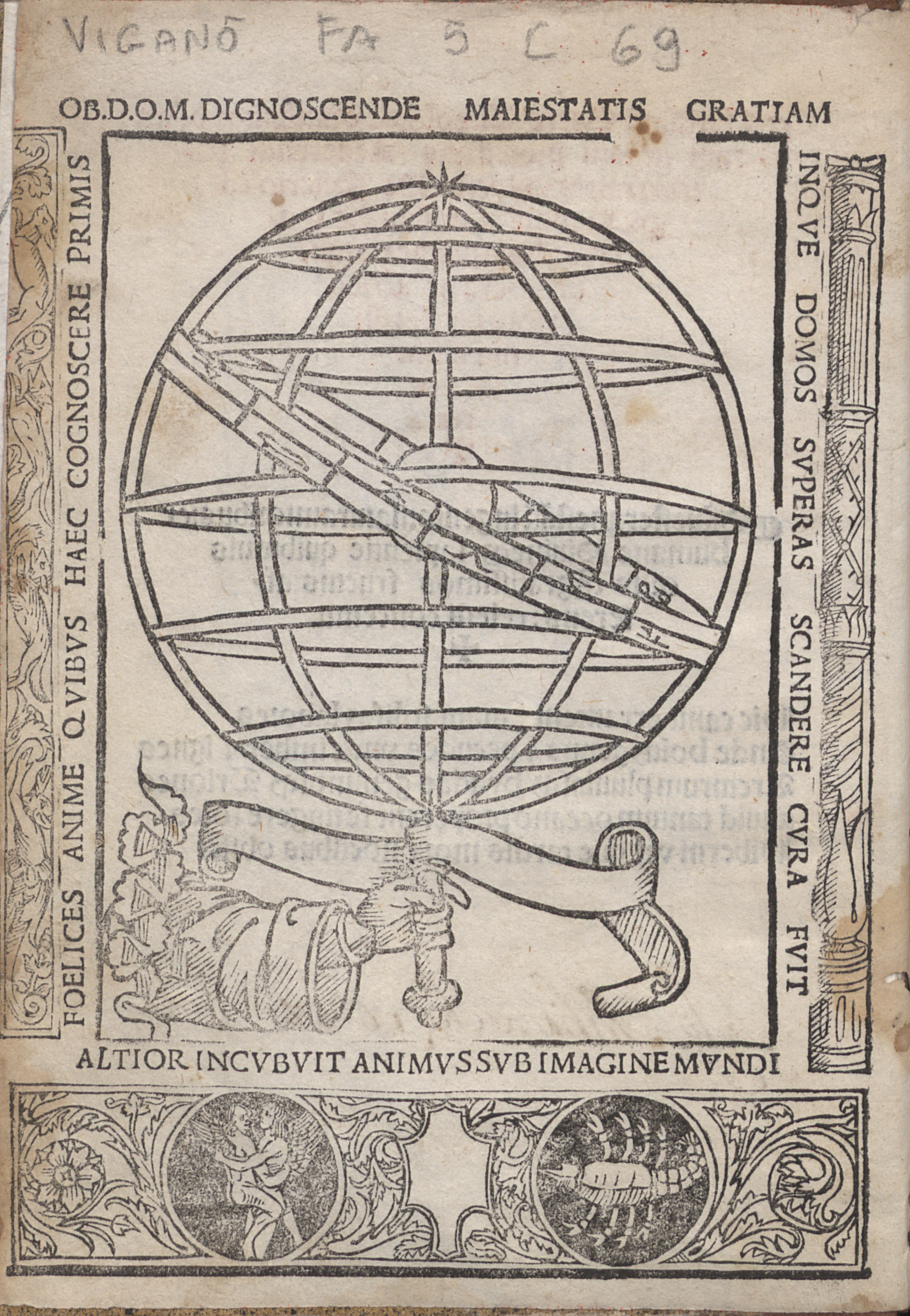
In spheram ac theoricas preclarissima commentaria, 1514.

Sylvester Mazzolini, in Italian Silvestro Mazzolini da Prierio, in Latin Sylvester Prierias (1456/1457–1527), was a theologian born at Priero, Piedmont; he died at Rome. Prierias perished when the imperial troops forced their way into the city, leading to the Sack of Rome.

== Biography ==
Born in Priero, in the Duchy of Savoy, between 1456 and 1457, Sylvester Mazzolini entered the Dominican Order at the age of fifteen. Passing brilliantly through a course of studies, he taught theology at Bologna, Pavia (by invitation of the senate of Venice), and in Rome, whither he was called by Julius II in 1511. In 1515, he was appointed Master of the Sacred Palace, filling that office until his death.

His writings cover a vast range, including treatises on the planets, the power of the demons, history, homiletics, the works of St. Thomas Aquinas, and the primacy of the popes. His exposition of Thomas' teaching was critical of the interpretations offered by his fellow Dominican Thomas de Vio Cajetan.

Prierias is credited with being the first theologian who by his writings attacked publicly the doctrines of Martin Luther. Johann Tetzel's productions against the arch-reformer are called by Jacques Échard scattered pages (folia volitantia), and Mazzolini stands forth as the first champion of Roman Pontiffs against Luther. Luther replied to Mazzolini's arguments and the latter published rejoinders, and there was a regular controversy between them.

According to D.J. Kennedy's article in the Catholic Encyclopedia, "the necessity of promptness in attack and defence will account for defects of style in some of his writings". Morgan Cowie is blunter on his performance in the controversy with Luther: "he succeeded so ill that the Pope forbade him to write any more on the matters in discussion". He further notes that the eighteenth-century Jesuit literary critic Girolamo Tiraboschi "is rather annoyed that Erasmus speaks ill of our author as a controversialist, but is compelled to allow it to be true." The sixteenth-century Franciscan theologian Alfonso de Castro found his argument on excommunication, for example, to be ill-founded.

== Works ==
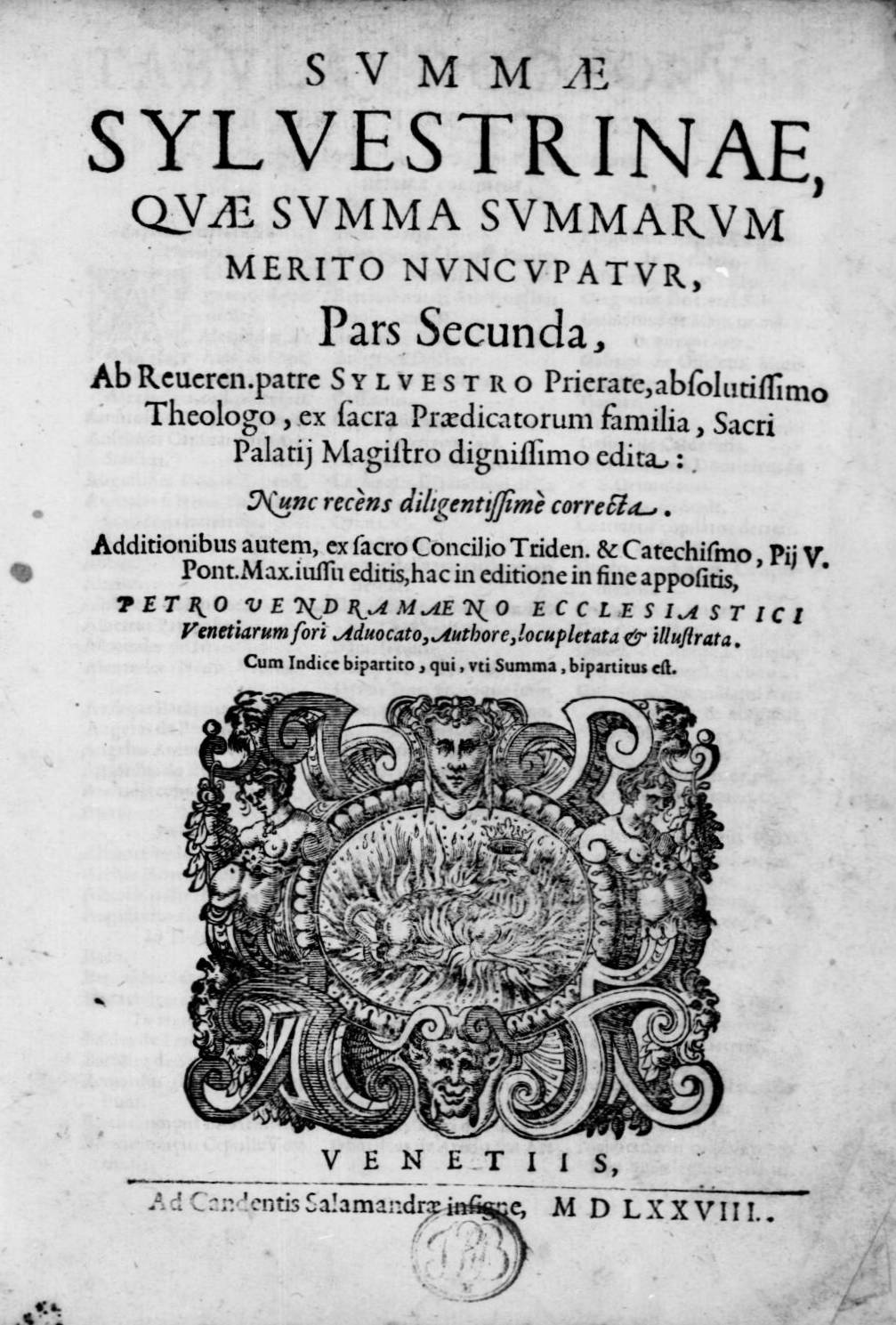
Summa summarum quae Silvestrina dicitur, 1578.

His principal works are:

- De juridica et irrefragabili veritate Romenæ Ecclesiæ Romenique Pontificis (Rome, 1520)
- Epitoma responsionis ad Lutherum (Perugia, 1519)
- Errata et argumenta M. Lutheri (Rome, 1520)
- Summa Summarum, quæ Sylvestrina dicitur (Rome, 1516), reprinted forty times
- an alphabetical encyclopedia of theological questions
- Rosa aurea (Bologna, 1510) an exposition of the Gospels of the year
- In theoricas planetarum (Venice, 1513).
- Trialogo chiamato Philamore (in Italian). Padua: Matteo Cerdonis. 1485.
- Compendium in Iohannem Capreolum cum additionibus (in Latin). Cremona: Carlo Darlerio. 1497.
- Vita di santa Maria Maddalena (in Italian). Impressa in lalma et inclita di Bologna: Giovanni Antonio Benedetti. 1500.
- In theoricas planetarum, Venice, 1513.
- In spheram ac theoricas preclarissima commentaria (in Latin). Milano: Gottardo Da Ponte. 1514.
- Summa Summarum, quæ Sylvestrina dicitur, Rome, 1515 (40 reprints).
  - Summae Sylvestrinae (in Latin). Vol. II. Venice: Damiano Zenaro. 1578.
- Epitoma responsionis ad Lutherum, Perugia, 1519.
- De juridica et irrefragabili veritate Romenæ Ecclesiæ Romenique Pontificis, Rome, 1520.
- Errata et argumenta M. Lutheri, Rome, 1520.

== Bibliography ==
- Tavuzzi, Michael M. (1997). Prierias: the Life and Works of Silvestro Mazzolini da Prierio, 1456–1527. Durham, N.C.: Duke University Press. ISBN 978-0-82-231976-4.
