= Roccavignale =

- Comune
- Comune di Roccavignale
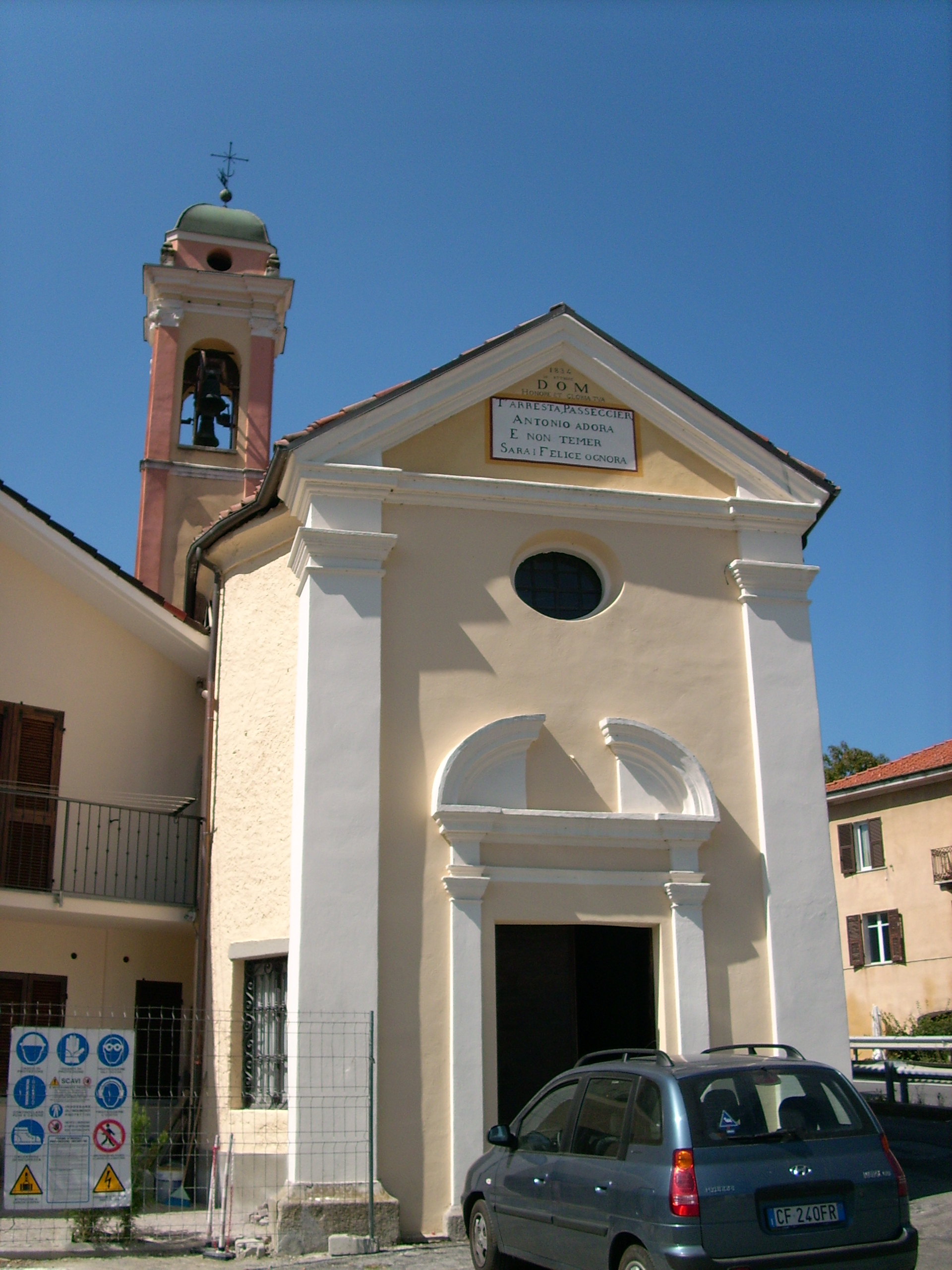
- Saint Anthony Church

- Location within Italy Location within Liguria
- Coordinates: 44°22′N 8°11′E
- Country: Italy
- Region: Liguria
- Province: Savona (SV)

Government
  - Mayor: Amedeo Fracchia

Area
  - Total: 17.4 km^{2} (6.7 sq mi)

Population (31 December 2015)
  - Total: 725
  - Density: 41.7/km^{2} (108/sq mi)
- Demonym: Roccavignalesi
- Time zone: UTC+1 (CET)
  - Summer (DST): UTC+2 (CEST)
- Postal code: 17010
- Dialing code: 019
- Website: Official website

Roccavignale (Ligurian: Ròcavignâ; Piedmontese: Rocavignâl) is a comune (municipality) in the Province of Savona in the Italian region Liguria, located about 60 kilometres (37 mi) west of Genoa and about 25 kilometres (16 mi) northwest of Savona.

Roccavignale borders the following municipalities: Castelnuovo di Ceva, Cengio, Millesimo, Montezemolo, and Murialdo.
