= Danilo Poggiolini =

Italian physician, writer and politician

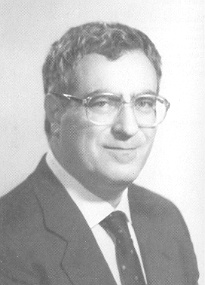

Member of Italian Chamber of Deputies
- In office 12 July 1983 – 14 April 1994
- Constituency: Turin

Member of the European Parliament
- In office 19 July 1994 – 19 July 1999

Personal details
- Born: 15 September 1932 (age 93) Rocca San Casciano, Emilia-Romagna, Italy
- Party: Italian Republican Party (1983–1993, 2001–); Segni Pact (1993–2001); Pact of Liberal Democrats (2003–2006)
- Other political affiliations: European People's Party (1994–1999); European Republicans Movement (1994–2001)
- Profession: Politician, physician, writer

Danilo Poggiolini (born 15 September 1932) is an Italian physician, writer and politician. He is also the husband of politician and journalist Carla Mazzuca Poggiolini.

== Biography ==
Poggiolini was born on 15 September 1932 in Rocca San Casciano. He would go on to get a degree in medicine and surgery, specializing in cardiology, and would go on to become the president of the National Federation of Orders of Surgeons and Dentists (FNOMCeO ).

After leaving office, he would retain this position and criticize Italy's public healthcare system during Mani pulite; claiming that hospital administrators were given rewards for party affiliation and not merit.

=== Political career ===
Originally Poggiolini was a member of the Italian Republican Party (PRI), winning a seat for the Italian Chamber of Deputies in Turin during the 1983 elections. He would hold this seat as part of the PRI through 2 more elections until 1992. During this time he would propose several laws in Italy related to the rules and regulations of the healthcare system.

He would go on, with his wife Carla Mazzuca Poggiolini to run under the Segni Pact, with him gaining office in the European Parliament in 1994. While there he would act as Vice Chair of the Committee on the Environment, Public Health and Consumer Protection along with serving on the EU's delegations to Russia, African, Caribbean and Pacific states (ACP), and China; the latter two he occasionally acted as Vice Chair of. During his tenure there he would ally himself with the European Peoples Party. He garnered much attention for his report on Alzheimer's disease to the previously mentioned committee.

== Legacy ==
Despite leaving office many people in Italy's health sector still remember the power he wielded, with nicknames like the "king Midas of health care," not to be confused for Dulio Poggiolini, whether for better or worse.

His name would even be brought up when some of his ideas and proposals would be revived for a vote after he had already left the Chamber of Deputies.

== Publications ==
- Marta e il suo tempo. Una donna libera a Roma, mentre cade il Duce, arrivano le bombe e lo scontro fra italiani. ISBN 9788833810997
- Mentre è papa Francesco. Il possibile dialogo fra un credente e un agnostico. ISBN 9788849225792
- Un estraneo nel palazzo. Dalle associazioni mediche alla politica. ISBN 9788863581867
- Un'Italia scomparsa. Dagli anni Trenta agli anni Sessanta del Novecento. ISBN 9788863582604
