= Montezemolo, Piedmont =

Montezemolo Monzemo (Piedmontese)
- Comune
- Comune di Montezemolo
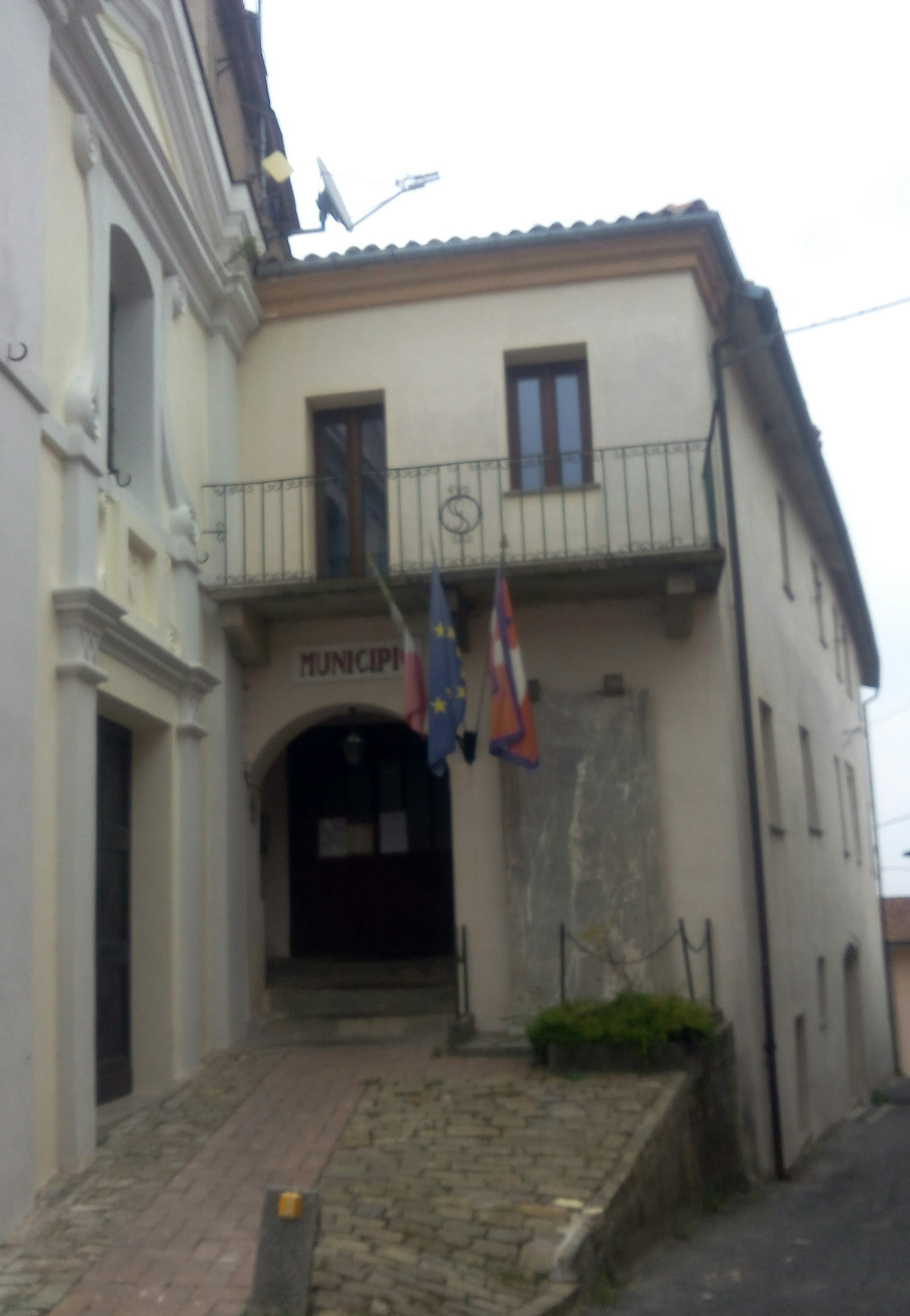
- Town hall, circa 2011

- Coat of arms

- Location within Italy Location within Piedmont
- Coordinates: 44°23′N 8°8′E
- Country: Italy
- Region: Piedmont
- Province: Cuneo (CN)

Government
  - Mayor: Giuseppe Taramazzo

Area
  - Total: 6.75 km^{2} (2.61 sq mi)
- Elevation: 750 m (2,460 ft)

Population (2021)
  - Total: 229
  - Density: 33.9/km^{2} (87.9/sq mi)
- Demonym: Montezemolesi
- Time zone: UTC+1 (CET)
  - Summer (DST): UTC+2 (CEST)
- Postal code: 12070
- Dialing code: 0174
- Website: Official website

Montezemolo (Italian: [ˌmontedˈdzɛːmolo, -dˈdzeːm-]; Piedmontese: Monzemo) is a village and comune (municipality) of c. 250 inhabitants in the Province of Cuneo in the Italian region of Piedmont, located about 80 kilometres (50 mi) southeast of Turin and about 45 kilometres (28 mi) east of Cuneo.

Montezemolo borders the following municipalities: Camerana, Castelnuovo di Ceva, Cengio, Priero, Roccavignale, Sale delle Langhe, and Saliceto.

== Demographics ==
Per Italian census data, the population of Montezemolo in 2021 is 229 people. Montezemolo has been conducting censuses since 1861.

Historical population

Year	Pop.	±%
1861	565	—
1871	647	+14.5%
1881	571	−11.7%
1901	586	+2.6%
1911	499	−14.8%
1921	545	+9.2%
1931	497	−8.8%
1936	459	−7.6%

Year	Pop.	±%
1951	431	−6.1%
1961	327	−24.1%
1971	255	−22.0%
1981	211	−17.3%
1991	228	+8.1%
2001	305	+33.8%
2011	270	−11.5%
2021	229	−15.2%

Montezemolo population statistics
