= Mario Mazzuca =

Italian rugby player

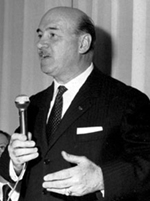

Personal information
- Nationality: Italian
- Born: 13 October 1910
- Died: 3 October 1983 (aged 72)
- Occupation: Lawyer

Sport
- Sport: Rugby

Mario Mazzuca (13 October 1910 – 3 October 1983) was an Italian lawyer, Rugby player, and sports manager.

== Biography ==
In the pre-War period, Mazzuca was actively involved in university sports. During this time he was a president of the Reale Yacht Club Canottieri Savoia while also working as a lawyer. Mazzuca would then participate in the founding of Partenope Rugby in the early 1950s and would later assist in founding Club Italia Amatori Rugby in 1974.

Mazzuca was a key member of the Italian National Olympic Committee (CONI) who helped organize the 1960 Summer Olympics. In 1973, Mazzuca would be made extraordinary commissioner, acting president, of the Italian Rugby Federation.

== Legacy ==
Mazzuca's daughter, Carla Mazzuca Poggiolini, went on to become a leading figure in Italian politics, serving in both the Chamber of Deputies and the Italian Senate. The city of Rome named a large public square in front of Stadio Flaminio after Mazzuca. Mazzuca was placed on a commemorative postage stamp in 2010 to celebrate his contributions to Italian athletics.

== Honours ==
Mazzuca was granted the Grand Official Order of Merit of the Italian Republic on 2 June 1965. In 1980 Mazzuca was granted the Golden Star for Sporting Merit.
