= Rocca di Verrua =

Castle in Piedmont, Italy

- Verrua Savoia, Piedmont, Italy
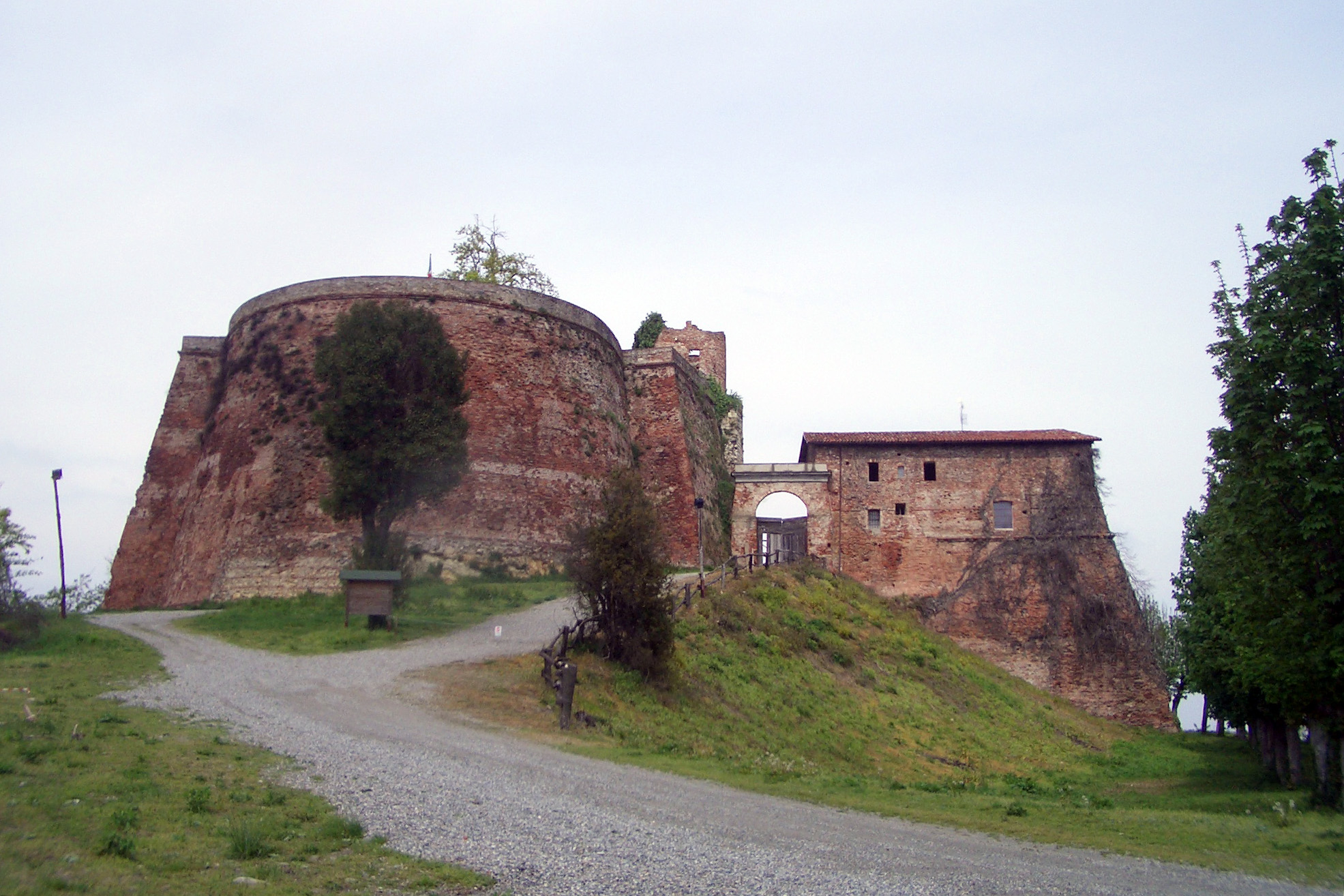
- Rocca di Verrua in 2009

Site information
- Type: Castle

Location
- Location within Italy
- Coordinates: 45°10′26.95″N 8°6′02.65″E

The Rocca di Verrua is a fortress located in Verrua Savoia, Piedmont, Italy.

== History ==
The first historical records of the fortification of Verrua date back to the year 999 when Emperor Otto III, through a decree, confirmed the possession of various territories, including Verrua, to Bishop Leone of Vercelli. In the following centuries, the fortified settlement was the target of numerous sieges, suffered destructions—most notably in 1167 by Frederick Barbarossa—and was repeatedly rebuilt. Its strategic location on a border made it a contested site among the Bishop of Vercelli, the March of Montferrat, the Visconti of Milan, the noble families of Vercelli, such as the Avogadro and Tizzoni, and the House of Savoy. In 1167, the castle permanently passed from the Bishop of Vercelli to the Marquises of Monferrato, who held it until 1248, when it was seized by the Counts of Savoy, though their control was not yet definitive. It was only in 1559 that the Savoy family managed to establish permanent rule over Verrua.

In the 17th century, the fortress was militarily improved in order to sustain cannon fire. In October 1704, during the War of the Spanish Succession, the fortress of Verrua endured its final siege by French troops under General Vendôme, resulting in around 13,000 casualties. Expected to fall quickly, the siege instead lasted until April 9, 1705. Verrua's valiant resistance weakened the French, allowing Victor Amadeus II, Duke of Savoy to reorganize his forces and achieve a decisive victory in the 1706 Battle of Turin. This triumph secured the future of the House of Savoy, leading to their ascension to the thrones of Sicily and later Sardinia.

== Description ==
Before the French siege of 1704, the Rocca was protected by a defensive wall and four bastions: Bastione della Vigna, Bastione dell’Alle, Bastione di Camus, and Bastione di Santa Maria. The fortress's main structure included the Donjon, soldiers' barracks, and a well. Below this complex lay the village of Verrua, featuring the Officers’ Quarters, Piazza Reale, the Governor's House, Church Barracks, the Church of Saint John the Baptist (the town's patron saint), and the Soccorso Barracks. At the fortress's center stood bomb-proof warehouses storing weapons and ammunition. The only entrance, the Porta del Soccorso, connected the stronghold to the plains via the road of the same name.
