= Carla Mazzuca Poggiolini =

Italian journalist and politician

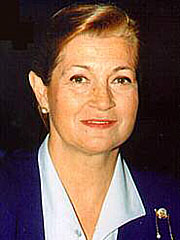

Member of Italian Chamber of Deputies
- In office 15 April 1994 – 8 May 1996
- Constituency: Lazio
- In office 30 May 2001 – 27 April 2006
- Constituency: Emilia-Romagna

Senator of the Italian Republic
- In office 9 May 1996 – 29 May 2001
- Constituency: Lazio

Personal details
- Born: 19 July 1943 (age 83) Rome, Italy
- Party: Segni Pact (1994–1995); The Democrats (1995–2001); The Olive Tree (1999–2001); Mixed Group (2001–2003); European Republicans Movement (2003–2006)
- Spouse: Danilo Poggiolini
- Profession: Politician, journalist

Carla Mazzuca Poggiolini (born 19 July 1943) is a professional journalist and Italian politician who served in both chambers of the Italian Parliament. She is the wife of Danilo Poggiolini.

== Biography ==
Mazzuca was born in Rome on 19 July 1943 to the Mazzuca family. Her father was Mario Mazzuca, a lawyer and prominent Italian rugby player who brought the sport to the country.

She claims to be a descendant of Carlo Armellini, an Italian politician from the 19th century. She is a distant cousin of Giancarlo Mazzuca, a modern right-wing Italian politician and a distant relative of Arch-Bishop Cesare Sambucetti.

Mazzuca would go on to graduate from a Liceo classico gaining a 'classical high school diploma.' Prior to entering politics, she worked as a journalist for Corriere della Sera. She would go on to serve in the Italian Parliament for 3 terms.

== Politics ==
Mazzuca began her political career in the Italian Chamber of Deputies during Legislature XII of Italy, during her tenure there she would join the Segni Pact alongside her husband Danilo Poggiolini. While serving there she would make a name for herself as president of the commission inquiring into ACNA di Cengio. Before finishing her term, she would switch parties to the Democrats. She would also serve on the Commission of Culture, Science, and Education during her first term in office.

Carla's party would then lead her to run alongside Italian Renewal (IR) for the Italian Senate during Legislature XIII of Italy, she would leave IR within a month of being elected and return to the Democrats. While serving in the Senate she would switch parties again, this time joining The Olive Tree. During her term in the Senate she served on the Parliamentary Commission for infancy.

Carla would finish her political career serving again as a member of the Chamber of Deputies in Legislature XIV of Italy. In her final term she would again change parties, finishing her term with the European Republicans Movement. During her final term in Parliament, she would serve on the commissions for social affairs; infants; culture, science, and education; environment, territory, and public works; and European Union policies.

== Sports ==
In her private life, Mazzuca claims to enjoy a variety of sports, such as tennis, sailing, horseback riding, diving.

Following her political career, she returned to the world of sports her father came from. In 1998 she helped organize the Italian Professional Boxing League, becoming its first president. She would also go on to work towards attempting to bring the Olympics to Italy.
