= Duílio =

Duílio is a surname. Notable people with the surname include:

- Duílio Dias (1935–1991), Brazilian footballer
- Duílio Júnior (born 1957), Brazilian footballer, son of Dias
