= Charles de Blanchefort =

French soldier

Charles I de Créquy, Prince de Poix, duc de Lesdiguières
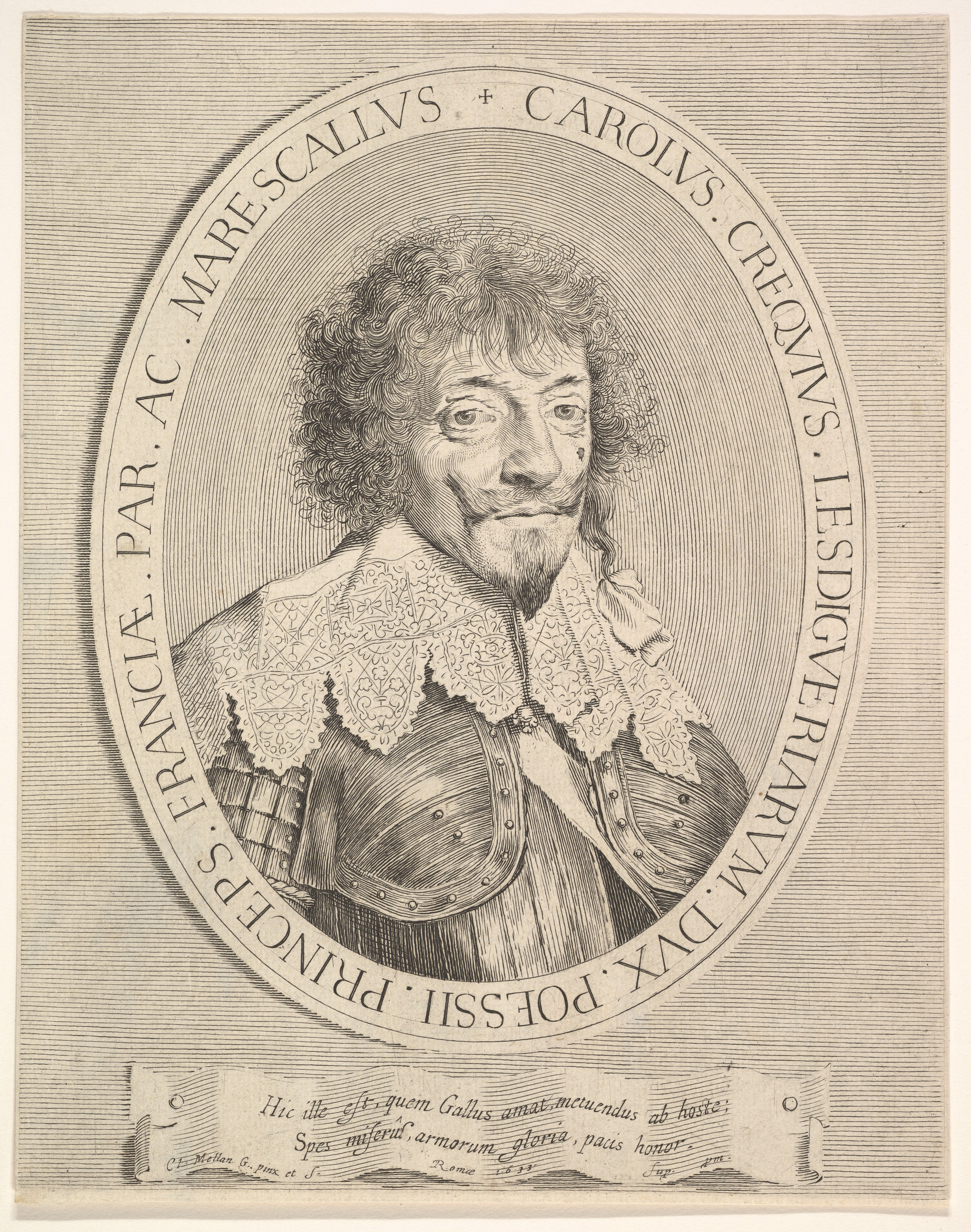
- Charles I de Créquy, Prince de Poix, duc de Lesdiguières
- Born: ca. 1575
- Died: 17 March 1638 (aged 62); Breme, Lombardy in Italy
- Military career
- Allegiance: France
- Branch: Army
- Service years: 1594–1638
- Rank: Marshal of France 1623
- Units: Colonel, Gardes Françaises 1605–1638
- Commands: Governor of the Dauphiné 1612–1638;
- Conflicts: Franco-Spanish War, 1595–1598; Laon 1594 Amiens, 1597; Franco-Savoyard War: 1600–1601; Bündner Wirren 1618–1639; War of the Mantuan Succession 1628–1630; Franco-Spanish War 1635–1659; Tornavento 1636
- Awards: Order of the Holy Spirit 1619
- Other work: Ambassador to Rome, (1633) and Venice, (1636)

Charles I de Créquy, Prince de Poix and Duc de Lesdiguières (1578–1638), was a leading French soldier of the first half of the 17th century.

== Life ==
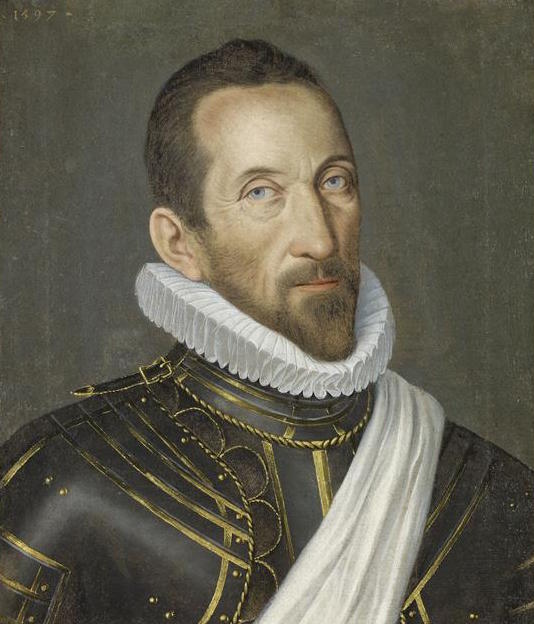
Créqui's father-in-law, François de Bonne, first duc de Lesdiguières (1543-1626)

Charles de Créquy, ca. 1575 to 17 March 1638, was the only child of Antoine de Blanchefort (ca. 1545–1575), and Chrétienne d’Aguerre (1556–1611), lady-in-waiting or dame d'honneur to Louise de Lorraine.

The de Créquy (Note: The 'y' was replaced by an 'i' during the Revolution, hence the alternative spelling of 'de Créqui') family were distributed throughout Northern France, with branches at Fressin, Bernieulles, Auffay and Heilly. They originated from Créquy, in Artois, which formed part of the French-speaking Southern Spanish Netherlands until annexed by France in 1659. Créqui's father Antoine de Blanchefort inherited his titles and lands from his uncle, another Antoine (1531–1574), Roman Catholic Bishop of Amiens and advisor to Charles IX.

This background is significant in understanding their importance; Catholic loyalists from a disputed border province, in a period when France was divided by the Wars of Religion and threatened by the Spanish Empire, then the dominant power in Europe. Charles later married into the Lesdiguières family, Huguenots from the Dauphiné, which was then another border province.

In 1595, Créqui married Madeleine de Bonne (1576–1621), daughter of François de Bonne, duc de Lesdiguières (1543–1626); they had four children, Françoise (1596–1656), Charles (1598–1630), François (1600–1677) and Madeleine (1609–1676). After his first wife's death in 1621, Créqui married her half-sister Françoise de Bonne (1604–1647), ensuring his succession as duc de Lesdiguières when his father-in-law died in 1626.

== Career ==
During the second half of the 16th century, France was divided by the 1562–1598 French Wars of Religion; in 1593 the Huguenot leader Henry of Navarre converted to Catholicism and was crowned Henry IV of France the following year. The 1598 Edict of Nantes ended this phase of the civil war. Créqui first saw action as a volunteer at the recapture of Laon by Henry in August 1594.

The long-running contest with Spanish and Austrian Habsburgs led to French involvement in the 1568–1648 Dutch Revolt and peripheral engagements of the 1618–48 Thirty Years War. During the 1627–1630 War of the Mantuan Succession, Créqui's eldest son and namesake died in 1630 at Chambéry, the capital of Savoy and he himself was killed in 1638 at Breme in Lombardy.

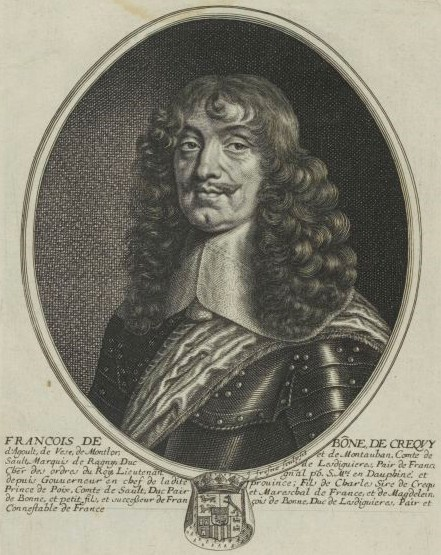
Charles' younger son, François de Bonne de Créqui, who succeeded him as duc de Lesdiguières and Governor of the Dauphiné

Créqui served under his father-in-law, the duc de Lesdiguières, in the 1600–1601 Franco-Savoyard War and was appointed Colonel of the Gardes Françaises in 1605. When Henry IV was assassinated in 1610, his son Louis XIII was only nine years old and his mother, Marie de Medici became Regent. Her concern at having the Protestant Lesdiguières as Governor of the Dauphiné led to his replacement in 1612 by Charles.

France regularly became involved in Italian disputes given its proximity to the Duchy of Savoy, which then included the modern French territories of Villefranche and the County of Savoy. In addition, control of Northern Italy allowed the Habsburgs to threaten the French provinces of Languedoc and the Dauphiné and control supply routes over the Alpine passes.

The capture of the Huguenot stronghold of La Rochelle in 1628 released French forces for the relief of Casale Monferrato, then besieged by a Habsburg army during the War of the Mantuan Succession. In March 1629, the French stormed barricades blocking the Pas de Suse and lift the siege of Casale; after agreeing the Treaty of Susa with Savoy in April, the French evacuated the area, leaving a garrison at the strategic fortress of Pinerolo.

Créqui was killed on 17 March 1638 while reconnoitring the beleaguered fortress during the Siege of Breme (1638),

== Legacy ==
Some of his letters are preserved in the Bibliothque Nationale in Paris, and his life was written by Nicolas Chorier (Grenoble, 1683).

== Sources ==
- Chisholm, Hugh, ed. (1911). "Créquy s.v. Charles I. de Blanchefort" . Encyclopædia Britannica. Vol. 7 (11th ed.). Cambridge University Press. pp. 410–411.
- Hanlon, Gregory (2016). The Ordeal of Tornavento in Italy 1636: Cemetery of Armies. OUP. ISBN 978-0198738251.;
- Pattou, Etienne. "Seigneurs de Créquy - Racines & Histoire" (PDF).;
- Sutherland, Nicola Mary (1982). Henry IV of France and the Politics of Religion: 1572-1596 Volume II. Elm Bank. ISBN 978-1841508467.
- Thion, Stephane (2013). French Armies of the Thirty Years' War. Histoire et Collections. ISBN 978-2917747018.;

French nobility
| Preceded by François de Bonne | duc de Lesdiguières; 1626–1638 | Succeeded by François de Bonne de Créquy |
Government offices
| Preceded by François, duc de Lesdiguières | Governor of the Dauphiné; 1612–1638 | Succeeded by François de Bonne de Créquy |
