= Priero =

- Comune
- Comune di Priero
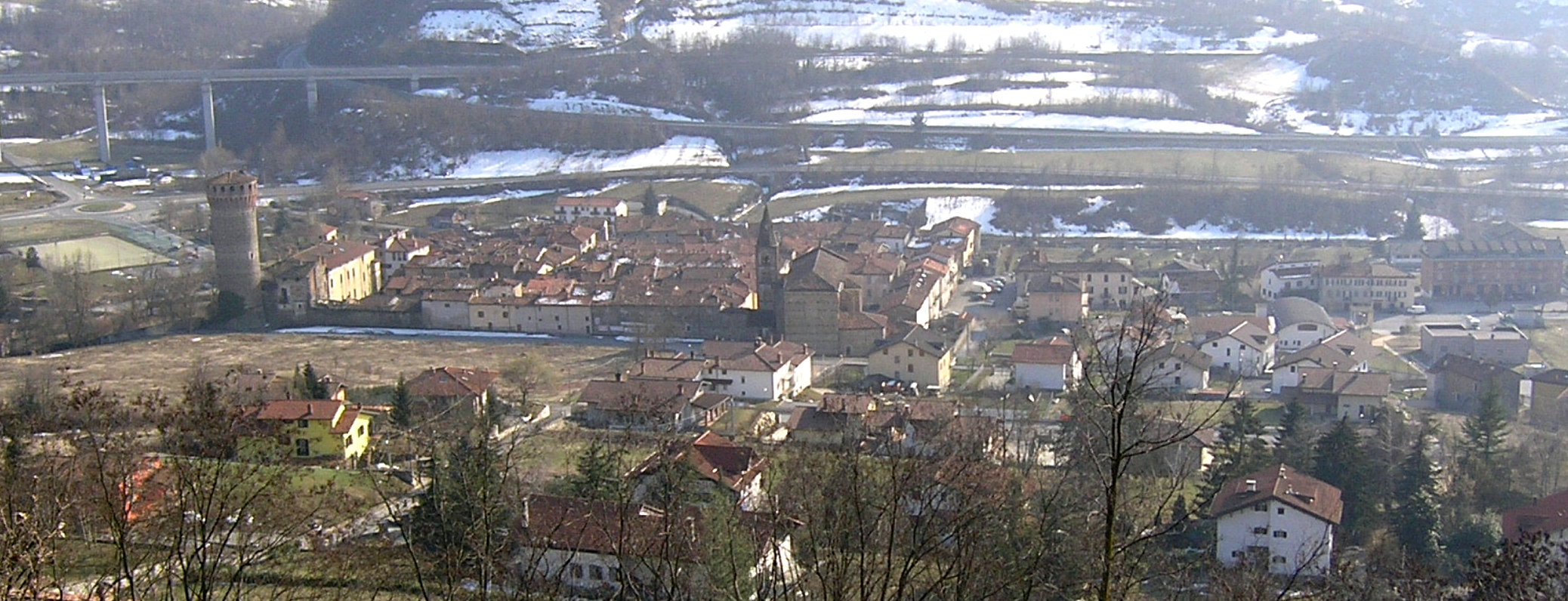

- Coat of arms

- Location within Italy Location within Piedmont
- Coordinates: 44°22′33″N 8°5′38″E
- Country: Italy
- Region: Piedmont
- Province: Cuneo (CN)

Government
  - Mayor: Andrea Paolo Boasso, elected 5 April 2005

Area
  - Total: 20.2 km^{2} (7.8 sq mi)
- Elevation: 475 m (1,558 ft)

Population (31 May 2007)
  - Total: 504
  - Density: 25.0/km^{2} (64.6/sq mi)
- Demonym: Prieresi
- Time zone: UTC+1 (CET)
  - Summer (DST): UTC+2 (CEST)
- Postal code: 12070
- Dialing code: 0174
- Website: Official website

Priero is a small town and comune of the Langhe, located 6 kilometres (4 mi) east of Ceva in the Province of Cuneo, Piedmont, Italy. Presently it has a population of 441.

== History ==
The original settlement, on a hill called Poggio to the south of the present village, dates from around the beginning of the second millennium. A pieve, dedicated to the Virgin Mary, had authority over the churches at Costelnuovo, Montezemolo, Osiglia, Calizzano Murialdo and Perlo while the fortified ricetto was the seat of a viscount appointed directly by the Emperor. In the mid-14th century the Marquis of Ceva became Lord of Priero and in 1387 plans were drawn up for the construction of the settlement, which forms the basis of today's Priero.

== Main sights ==
The village preserves its 14th-century layout. The remains of the old castle, the defensive walls and their towers are all visible. The church of Santi Antonio e Giuliano, first constructed in 1494, retains its original campanile. The rest of the building, however was demolished in the late 17th century and rebuilt in 1716 to plans by F. Gallo.

== People ==
- Sylvester Mazzolini da Prierio (1456–57 – 1523)
