= Battle of Tornavento =

1636 battle of the Thirty Years' War

Coordinates: 45.6000°N 8.6333°E

- Part of Franco-Spanish War (1635)
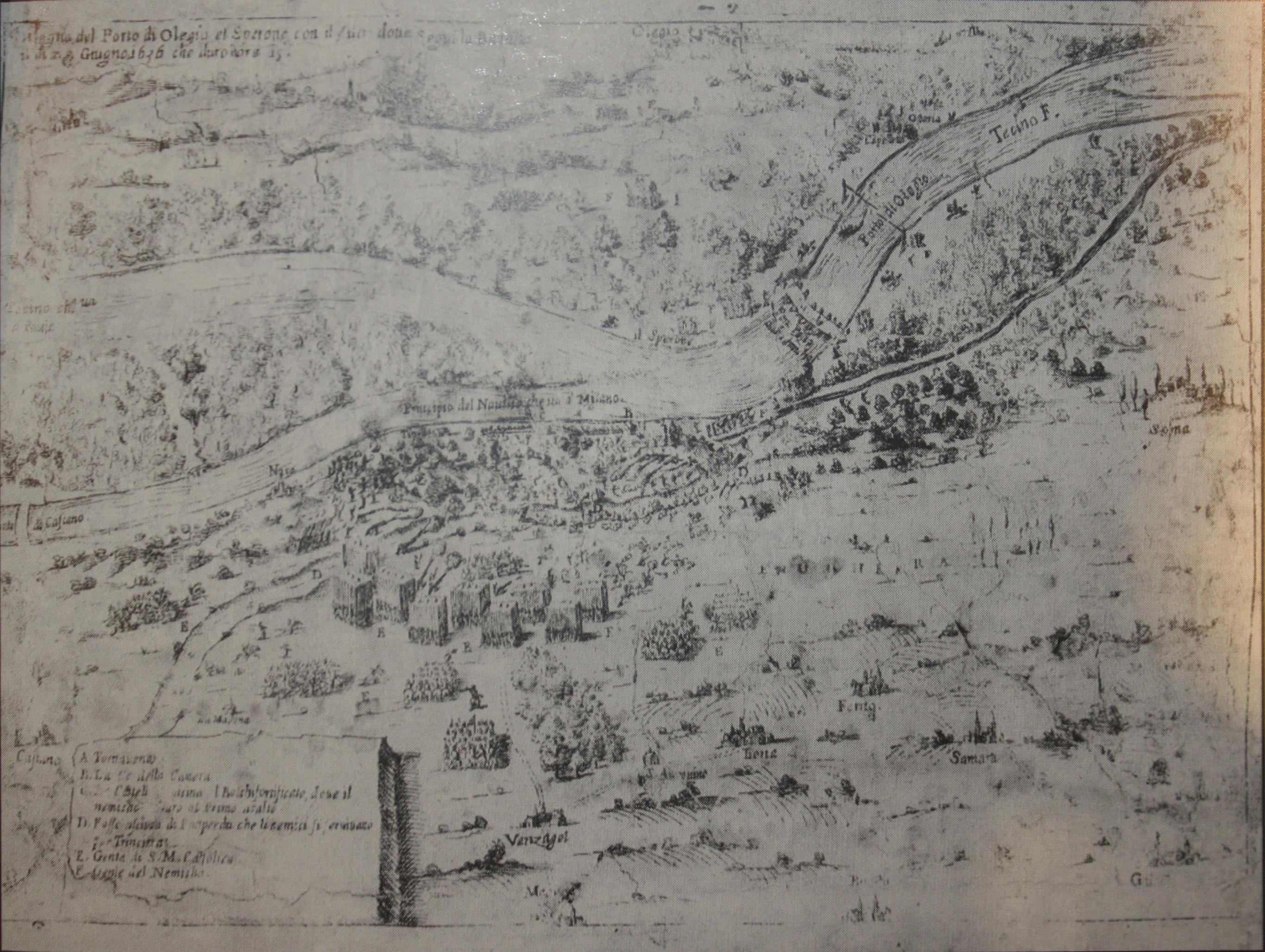
- The battle of Tornavento in a seventeenth-century graphic representation
Date	22 June 1636
Location	Tornavento, near Oleggio and Lonate Pozzolo (present-day Italy)
Result	Disputed

Belligerents
France; Savoy	Spain

Commanders and leaders
(Kingdom of France) Charles de Créquy (Duchy of Savoy) Victor Amadeus I	(Spain) Marqués de Leganés

Strength
16,700; (Kingdom of France) 6,000 infantry; (Kingdom of France) 1,200 cavalry; (Duchy of Savoy) 8,000 infantry; (Duchy of Savoy) 1,500 cavalry	14,500; 10,000 infantry; 4,500 cavalry

Casualties and losses
1,200+ killed 1,000 wounded	1,300 killed 1,000 wounded

The Battle of Tornavento was fought in Northwest Italy on 22 June 1636, during the Thirty Years' War.

== Prelude ==
In 1636, Cardinal Richelieu had persuaded the Duke of Savoy, Victor Amadeus I, to launch an offensive on the Spanish Duchy of Milan. A French army crossed the Ticino river between Oleggio and Lonate Pozzolo, but was checked by a larger Spanish army, and dug in to await their Savoyard allies.

== Battle ==
On 22 June the Spanish attacked, but were held back after the arrival of the army of Victor Amadeus I, Duke of Savoy. Fighting in the summer heat was savage and bloody, in a heathland described by Spanish officers as "sin àrbol, y con falta de agua" ("treeless, and lacking water"). The fighting started at 8:00 a.m. The Spanish made several attacks on the Franco-Savoyard line, which was fortified on a slope. Both sides dug trenches and threw up earthworks, with fighting often devolving into scattered local exchanges of gunfire punctuated by intense bouts of melee combat. By the evening, the Spanish had been repulsed and the Franco-Savoyards retook all positions, leading to the dug-in sides exchanging gunfire for prolonged periods to little effect. Infrequent fighting continued after sundown.

There were high casualties on both sides until Leganés, seeing little chance of dislodging a numerically inferior and entrenched enemy, decided to preserve his army by withdrawing under the cover of darkness. In order to ensure he was not pursued while vulnerable, Leganés had soldiers align hundreds of pikes in the ground behind their own entrenchments to give the impression that they were held in force, and then set hundreds of muskets alongside them, with their lit wicks glowing in the darkness. He also instructed a detachment of dragoons be left behind as the rearguard to prowl along the enemy line and fire all night long into the darkness. The retreat was a success, and the Spanish withdrew without the loss of any baggage or cannons. Victor Amadeus and Créquy, characterizing their armies as exhausted and considering it "miraculous" that they had managed to repel the Spanish assaults, chose not to press another attack. The Spanish abandoned the battlefield and retired to Boffalora. The battle lasted about 14 hours in total. At that time the Franco-Savoyard army was composed of two-thirds musketeers and arquebusiers, and expended 30,000 pounds of gunpowder, firing some 675,000 bullets.

=== Aftermath ===
Little was achieved after the battle, the Franco-Savoyard army staying temporarily in the Ticino valley, sacking nearby towns and damaging a canal. The area of Lonate was raided on 23 June. On 2 July the Naviglio Grande was blocked near Nosate. On July 7, the troops of Savoy and Parma marched in the Novara area towards Castelletto Ticino, and in the meantime the French cavalry reached the area of Sesto, while the rest of the army remained in Somma. French soldiers on July 9 sacked the villages of Gavirate, Besozzo and Azzate. Unsuccessful attempts were conducted towards Varese and Angera. Between 10 and 15 July, the French and Savoyard armies camped at Romagnano, and then at Gattinara, outside the State of Milan.

William P. Guthrie, Gregory Hanlon, and David Parrott state the French-Savoyard army won a victory, while Pierre Picouet states the battle was inconclusive.

== Reenactment ==
Every year in the hamlet of Tornavento a reenactment of the battle is held by volunteers, geared with equipment of the time.
