= Verrua Savoia =

- Comune
- Comune di Verrua Savoia
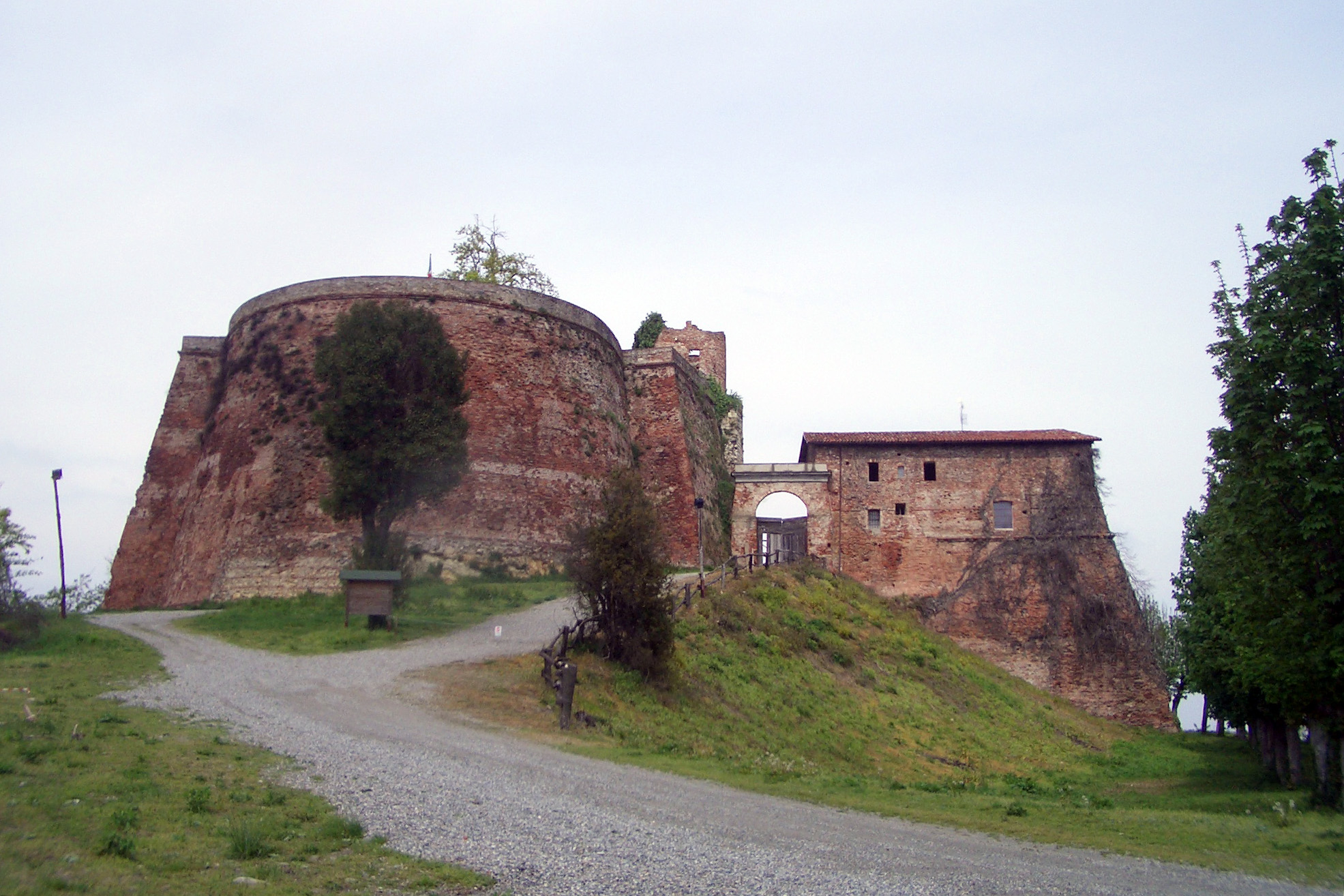
- The fortress of Verrua.

- Coat of arms

- Location within Italy Location within Piedmont
- Coordinates: 45°9′N 8°6′E
- Country: Italy
- Region: Piedmont
- Metropolitan city: Turin (TO)
- Frazioni: Camorano, Campasso, Carbignano, Cascine, Case Bazzoli, Case Cocetti, Casetto, Cervoto, Collegna, Fravagnano, Mezzi, Mompiola, Montaldo, Rivalta, Rocca, Sbarrera, Scandolera, Siberia, Sivrasco, Sulpiano, Tabbia, Trucco, Valentino

Government
  - Mayor: Paola Moscoloni (Civic List)

Area
  - Total: 31.9 km^{2} (12.3 sq mi)

Population (1-1-2017)
  - Total: 1,439
  - Density: 45.1/km^{2} (117/sq mi)
- Demonym: Verruese(i)
- Time zone: UTC+1 (CET)
  - Summer (DST): UTC+2 (CEST)
- Postal code: 10020
- Dialing code: 0161
- Patron saint: St. John the Baptist
- Saint day: 24 June
- Website: Official website

Verrua Savoia is a comune (municipality) in the Metropolitan City of Turin in the Italian region Piedmont, located about 35 kilometres (22 mi) northeast of Turin. The 18th-century San Giovanni Battista is a parish church in town.
