= Duilio Poggiolini =

Italian physician and convicted criminal (1929–2020)

- Born: 25 July 1929; Rome, Italy
- Died: 24 November 2020 (aged 91)
- Education: Physiology
- Known for: Fraud related to Mani Pulite
- Criminal charges: Corruption
- Criminal penalty: 7 and a half years in prison commuted to 4 years and 4 months house arrest and 29 billion Euro penalty
- Criminal status: Commuted
- Spouse: Pierr Di Maria (1929-2007)
- Children: 1
- Honours: Order of Merit of the Italian Republic (revoked), Public Health Medal of Merit (revoked)

Duilio Poggiolini (25 July 1929 – 24 November 2020) was an Italian general manager of the pharmaceutical department of the National Ministry of Health under Francesco De Lorenzo and was involved in the Mani Pulite (Clean Hands) scandal of Tangentopoli. He was member of the P2 Masonic lodge.

== Background ==
Poggiolini was born on 25 July 1929. He graduated in medicine in 1954, majored in physiology and in 1963 achieved a position as professor of microbiology, in 1966 professor in chemotherapy, then in 1972 professor of hygiene. In 1972 he became inspector general at the Ministry of Health.

In 1981 he became the Italian representative in the World Health Organization for the essential drugs program. In 1991 he was elected President of the Commission for pharmaceuticals concerned with EEC harmonization of medicine between the Member States of the European Economic Community. He was also vice president of the Italian Pharmacopoeia Commission. He also was the President of the European Union Committee for Proprietary Medical Products and Director General of the Italian Ministry of Health.

On 20 September 1993 he was arrested at Lausanne, in Switzerland, due to a series of charges related to forgery and bribery in the management of health services, in favor of large pharmaceutical companies. Poggiolini tried to escape, but was found after a few weeks.

Poggiolini died on 24 November 2020, at the age of 91. His death was not announced until October 2025.

== The health bribery scandal ==
Poggiolini initially denied having given instructions for price increases with compensation payments to Poggiolini and other officials of the Ministry. He was later accused of having favored the entry of some drugs on formulary after health payments and gifts, goods or money.

At the time of his arrest over 15 billion lire in an account in Switzerland was seized; the account was registered to his wife, Maria Di Pierr Poggiolini. In addition to a house in Naples, the couple had several billion francs in gold ingots, jewels, paintings and ancient and modern coins (including gold Tsar Nicholas II rubles and South African Krugerrand). He was imprisoned in Poggioreale, Naples for seven months.

At the outbreak of the scandal, he was given various nicknames by the press, including "The King Midas of Health" or the boss of malpractice (even the "monster of medical malpractice"). Before the discovery of the treasures, Poggiolini had led a simple life, almost poor, but when the search warrant was issued investigators required twelve hours to catalog the treasures hidden in closets, sofas, mattresses and ottoman cushions.

The criminal offenses as revealed in the process were designed by Duilio Poggiolini Pierr and his wife Di Maria, him masterminding the procedures, while the latter proceeded to collect the fees.

The defense asked for the application of mitigation, because the search of riches for Poggiolini was a "morbid condition" that was not accepted by the judges. In a closed session c, on 21 July 2000, Poggiolani was condemned to seven and a half years in prison and his wife four years, excluding the offense of criminal conspiracy. Of the 40 incidents of alleged kickbacks, twenty were confirmed.

An appeal reduced the sentence to four years and four months, and the verdict was confirmed by the Supreme Court, which ordered the seizure of assets for 39 billion (29 for him, 10 for her).

The sentence has been served by Duilio Poggiolini mainly as house arrest and work in social services, and with shorter sentences for Pierr Di Maria.

On 30 August 2006 Poggiolini was pardoned, seeing the sentence reduced to two years. At the same time his wife had returned to live in his villa in the neighborhood of Rome together with his son, who suffers from a brain disease. She would die on October 30, 2007.

Poggiolini has published a memoir, Nothing but the Truth: The Drugs in Italy, My Struggles, My Mistakes, but the edition was withdrawn and later matriculated.

The Supreme Court laid down a final ruling in April 2012, confirming the judgment of the Court of Auditors of April 2011, fining Poggiolini 5,164,569 euros to compensate the State for offenses of corruption or bribery "ascribed to agreed that in the years 1982-1992, respectively, in positions covered under the government, had received money from several pharmaceutical companies, resulting in a loss of revenue derived from the unjustified rise of total pharmaceutical expenditure". Francesco De Lorenzo was involved in the same judgment, with both being charged in part for damaging the image of the government.

== Honours ==
Date	Country	Decoration	Notes
2 June 1974	Italy	Order of Merit of the Italian Republic, 2nd Class	Was revoked for unworthiness on November 26, 2014
13 July 1977	Italy	Public Health Medal of Merit	Was revoked for unworthiness on November 26, 2014

The awards received by him were revoked in the aftermath of the previously mentioned scandal, by decree from the president, on November 26, 2014.

== Infected blood products ==
Duilio Poggiolini was also investigated by the Prosecutor of Trento following a series of infections with HIV and hepatitis C occurred in the early 1990s through the transfusion of pockets of plasma that had not been adequately controlled, provided by the Marcucci property group of Guelph Marcucci. Between 1985 and 2008 2605 victims were found of transfusion with contaminated blood plasma and blood derivatives. 66,000 claims have come from patients to the Ministry of Health. By December 2008 approximately 49,000 people have received a check for 1,080 euros every two months. The claim that the State has asked Italian Duilio Poggiolini is 60 million.

Blood products, in particular sandoglobuline for the treatment of hemophilia, were not checked for the presence of viruses or treated with viral inactivation, which led to the distribution and sale of infectious material that was administered to patients who subsequently became infected.

On 27 December 2007, Maria Vittoria De Simone, ordered the Public Prosecutor of Naples to charge Duilio Poggiolini and 10 other suspects for manslaughter. Consequently, 25 years after the first deaths from AIDS among hemophiliacs, a historic criminal trial commenced for hundreds of dead Italians.

On 31 July 2008, the Public Prosecutor of Naples requested the indictment of Duilio Poggiolini and ten other defendants for manslaughter. In 2011, the last of 8 people who had been infected as a result of the blood products involved in the trial died, resulting in Poggiolini's eventual acquittal on March 25, 2019.
