= Cengio =

- Comune
- Comune di Cengio
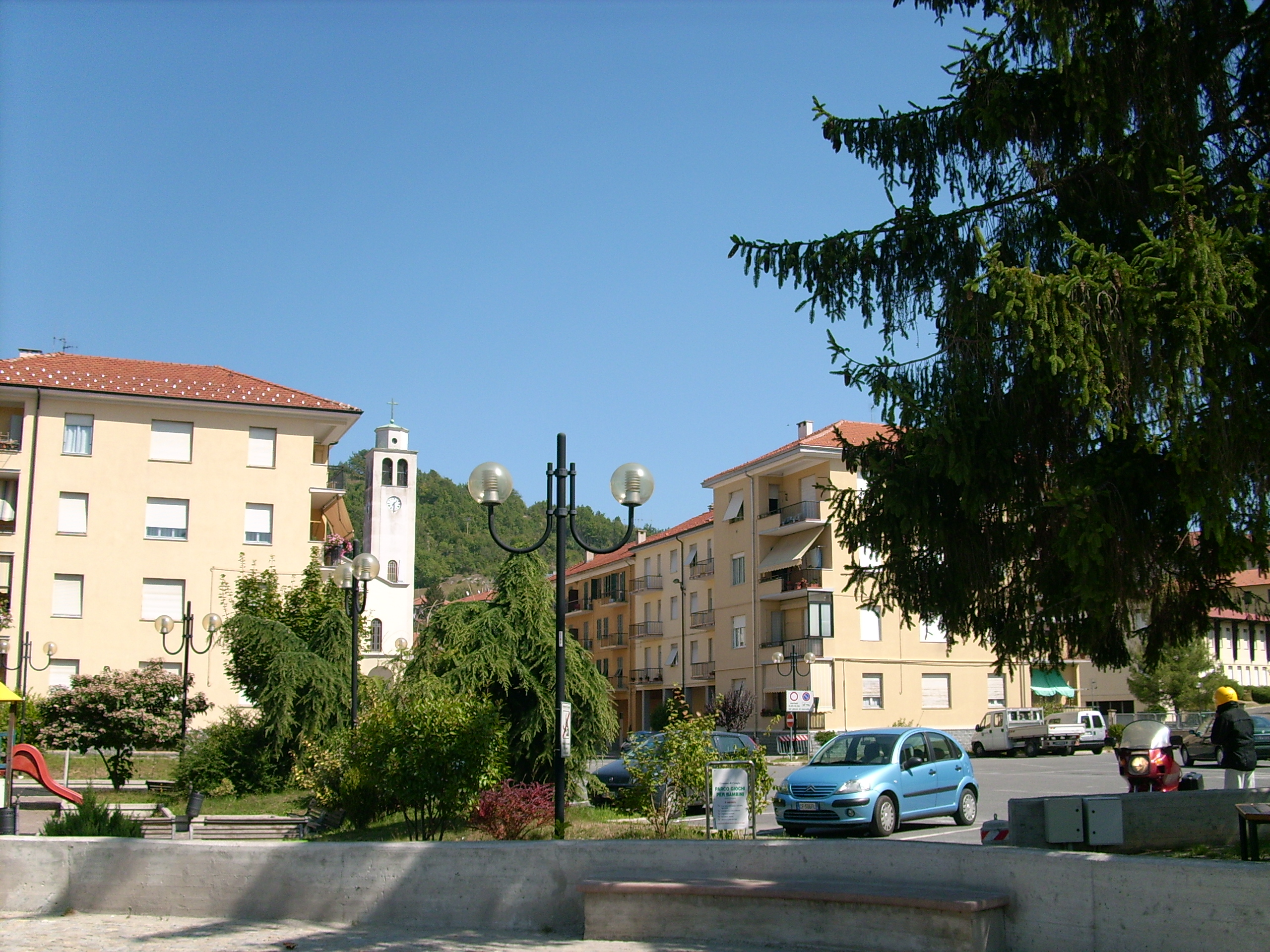

- Coat of arms

- Location within Italy Location within Liguria
- Coordinates: 44°23′N 8°13′E
- Country: Italy
- Region: Liguria
- Province: Province of Savona (SV)

Area
  - Total: 18.8 km^{2} (7.3 sq mi)
- Elevation: 360 m (1,180 ft)

Population (Dec. 2004)
  - Total: 3,744
  - Density: 199/km^{2} (516/sq mi)
- Demonym: Cengesi
- Time zone: UTC+1 (CET)
  - Summer (DST): UTC+2 (CEST)
- Postal code: 17010
- Dialing code: 019

Cengio (Ligurian: Ceng or Çengio; Piedmontese: Cengg) is a comune (municipality) in the Province of Savona in the Italian region Liguria, located about 60 kilometres (37 mi) west of Genoa and about 25 kilometres (16 mi) northwest of Savona. As of 31 December 2004, it had a population of 3,744 and an area of 18.8 square kilometres (7.3 mi^{2}).

Cengio borders the following municipalities: Cairo Montenotte, Cosseria, Millesimo, Montezemolo, Roccavignale, and Saliceto.

== Demographic evolution ==
Historical population

Year	Pop.	±%
1861	1,230	—
1871	1,288	+4.7%
1881	1,322	+2.6%
1901	1,377	+4.2%
1911	1,668	+21.1%

Year	Pop.	±%
1921	2,747	+64.7%
1931	2,592	−5.6%
1936	3,043	+17.4%
1951	3,682	+21.0%
1961	4,375	+18.8%

Year	Pop.	±%
1971	4,315	−1.4%
1981	4,603	+6.7%
1991	4,298	−6.6%
2001	3,777	−12.1%

Source: Data from ISTAT
